= National Register of Historic Places listings in Daviess County, Kentucky =

Location of Daviess County in Kentucky

This is a list of the National Register of Historic Places listings in Daviess County, Kentucky.

This is intended to be a complete list of the properties and districts on the National Register of Historic Places in Daviess County, Kentucky, United States. The locations of National Register properties and districts for which the latitude and longitude coordinates are included below, may be seen in a map.

There are 40 properties and districts listed on the National Register in the county. Another property was once listed but has been removed.

This National Park Service list is complete through NPS recent listings posted October 23, 2026.

== Current listings ==
	Name on the Register	Image	Date listed	Location	City or town	Description
1	Alexander-Ford Farmhouse		September 22, 2025 (#100012240)	5785 Highway 144; 37°47′53″N 87°01′06″W	Thruston	
2	Archeological Site 15 Da 39	Archeological Site 15 Da 39	December 22, 1978 (#78001310)	Off the Ohio River shoreline northeast of Owensboro; 37°51′30″N 87°01′54″W	Maceo	
3	D.D. Bogard House	D.D. Bogard House	May 22, 1980 (#80001503)	303 E. 4th St. 37°46′23″N 87°06′30″W	Owensboro	
4	Breidenbach Building	Breidenbach Building	March 28, 1986 (#86000660)	208 W. 3rd St. 37°46′25″N 87°06′46″W	Owensboro	
5	Callas Sweet Shop	Callas Sweet Shop	March 28, 1986 (#86000661)	420 Frederica Ave. 37°46′19″N 87°06′49″W	Owensboro	
6	Carnegie Free Public Library (DAOB 41)	Carnegie Free Public Library (DAOB 41)	August 6, 1986 (#86002234)	901 Frederica Ave. 37°46′02″N 87°06′45″W	Owensboro	
7	Le Vega Clements House	Le Vega Clements House	March 28, 1986 (#86000663)	1500 N. Highland Ave. 37°46′27″N 87°05′31″W	Owensboro	
8	Confederate Monument in Owensboro	Confederate Monument in Owensboro	July 17, 1997 (#97000708)	1 block north of the junction of U.S. Routes 60 and 431; 37°46′26″N 87°06′48″W	Owensboro	
9	Howell J. Davis House	Howell J. Davis House	August 3, 1990 (#90001168)	3301 Veach Rd. 37°44′17″N 87°06′08″W	Owensboro	
10	Doctors' Row Historic District	Doctors' Row Historic District	March 28, 1986 (#86000662)	W. 4th St. between Frederica and Saint Ann Sts. 37°46′22″N 87°06′44″W	Owensboro	
11	Federal Building and US Post Office-Owensboro	Federal Building and US Post Office-Owensboro	April 13, 1989 (#89000295)	5th and Frederica; 37°46′18″N 87°06′46″W	Owensboro	
12	Gillim House	Gillim House	March 28, 1986 (#86000664)	517 Frederica St. 37°46′15″N 87°06′46″W	Owensboro	
13	Felix Grimes House	Felix Grimes House	June 18, 1975 (#75000746)	1301 Leitchfield Rd. 37°45′55″N 87°05′22″W	Owensboro	Demolished
14	Haphazard	Haphazard	August 22, 1975 (#75000747)	Pleasant Valley Rd. 37°46′56″N 87°04′24″W	Owensboro	
15	Ken-Rad Lamp Plant		October 19, 2026 (#100013545)	601 E. Ninth Street; 37°46′04″N 87°06′16″W	Owensboro	
16	Kentucky Buggy Company Building	Kentucky Buggy Company Building	September 29, 2015 (#15000649)	301 E. 9th St. 37°46′04″N 87°06′28″W	Owensboro	
17	Thomas Krahwinkel House	Thomas Krahwinkel House	July 30, 2013 (#13000556)	10501 U.S. Route 60; 37°50′37″N 87°18′39″W	Owensboro	
18	McKay-Thornberry House	McKay-Thornberry House	May 3, 1984 (#84001408)	S. Hampton Rd. 37°45′42″N 86°58′00″W	Owensboro	
19	Medley House	Medley House	February 20, 1980 (#80001504)	1220 Frederica St. 37°45′52″N 87°06′47″W	Owensboro	
20	George Mischel and Sons Building	George Mischel and Sons Building	March 28, 1986 (#86000756)	412 E. 2nd St. 37°46′30″N 87°06′25″W	Owensboro	
21	Monarch-Payne House	Monarch-Payne House	March 28, 1986 (#86000757)	1432 E. 4th St. 37°46′26″N 87°05′34″W	Owensboro	
22	J.Z. Moore Historic District	J.Z. Moore Historic District	March 28, 1986 (#86000659)	Roughly bounded by W. and E. 12th, Daviess, E. and W. 14th, and Saint Ann Sts. 37°45′51″N 87°06′37″W	Owensboro	
23	Moorman House	Moorman House	March 27, 1992 (#92000140)	2731 W. 2nd St. 37°46′29″N 87°08′40″W	Owensboro	
24	Mount St. Joseph Academy	Mount St. Joseph Academy	January 25, 1979 (#79000970)	Kentucky Route 56; 37°41′35″N 87°19′29″W	Saint Joseph	
25	Odd Fellows Building	Odd Fellows Building	March 28, 1986 (#86000758)	200-204 W. 3rd St. 37°46′25″N 87°06′45″W	Owensboro	
26	Owensboro Armory	Owensboro Armory	September 6, 2002 (#02000919)	1501 Parrish Ave. 37°45′40″N 87°07′34″W	Owensboro	Demolished 2012
27	Owensboro Historic Commercial District	Owensboro Historic Commercial District	January 12, 1983 (#83002626)	2nd St. between St. Ann and Lewis Sts. 37°46′29″N 87°06′38″W	Owensboro	
28	Owensboro Historic Downtown Commercial District	Owensboro Historic Downtown Commercial District	July 26, 2005 (#04001251)	Roughly between Frederica, Clay, 2nd, and 4th Sts. 37°46′27″N 87°06′38″W	Owensboro	
29	Phillip's Court District	Phillip's Court District	March 28, 1986 (#86000658)	Roughly bounded by Technical High School, Cruze Dr., W. 18th St., and Frederica Ave. 37°45′39″N 87°06′40″W	Owensboro	
30	Camden Riley House	Camden Riley House	March 28, 1986 (#86000760)	112 E. 4th St. 37°46′21″N 87°06′51″W	Owensboro	
31	St. Joseph Church	St. Joseph Church	November 3, 1983 (#83003651)	4th and Clay Sts. 37°46′22″N 87°06′22″W	Owensboro	
32	Maj. Hampden Smith House	Maj. Hampden Smith House	September 28, 1976 (#76000865)	909 Frederica St. 37°46′01″N 87°06′44″W	Owensboro	
33	James L. Stinnett House	James L. Stinnett House	December 30, 2019 (#100004830)	10184 Hwy 54; 37°40′59″N 86°52′05″W	Whitesville	
34	James J. Sweeney House	James J. Sweeney House	August 11, 1980 (#80001505)	121 E. 5th St. 37°46′19″N 87°06′36″W	Owensboro	
35	Temple Adath Israel	Temple Adath Israel	March 28, 1986 (#86000761)	429 Daviess St. 37°46′19″N 87°06′34″W	Owensboro	
36	Thompson and Powell Martyrs Monument	Thompson and Powell Martyrs Monument	July 17, 1997 (#97000707)	Junction of Kentucky Routes 56 and 500; 37°41′44″N 87°19′30″W	Saint Joseph	
37	Trinity Episcopal Church	Trinity Episcopal Church	April 10, 1972 (#72000530)	403 W. 5th St. 37°46′18″N 87°06′53″W	Owensboro	
38	Union Station	Union Station	August 1, 1979 (#79000969)	1039 Frederica St. 37°45′57″N 87°06′43″W	Owensboro	
39	Willow Hill	Willow Hill	June 9, 1982 (#82004621)	Jones Rd. 37°47′01″N 87°00′47″W	Owensboro	
40	Yewell House	Yewell House	March 28, 1986 (#86000762)	630 Clay St. 37°46′12″N 87°06′23″W	Owensboro	

== Former listing ==
	Name on the Register	Image	Date listed	Date removed	Location	City or town	Description
1	Ames Building		March 28, 1986 (#86000657)	October 17, 1988	401 W. Third St.	Owensboro	Was being partially demolished when it was destroyed by fire on July 17, 1987.

== See also ==
- List of National Historic Landmarks in Kentucky
- National Register of Historic Places listings in Kentucky
