= Martyrs Monument in Midway =

- U.S. National Register of Historic Places
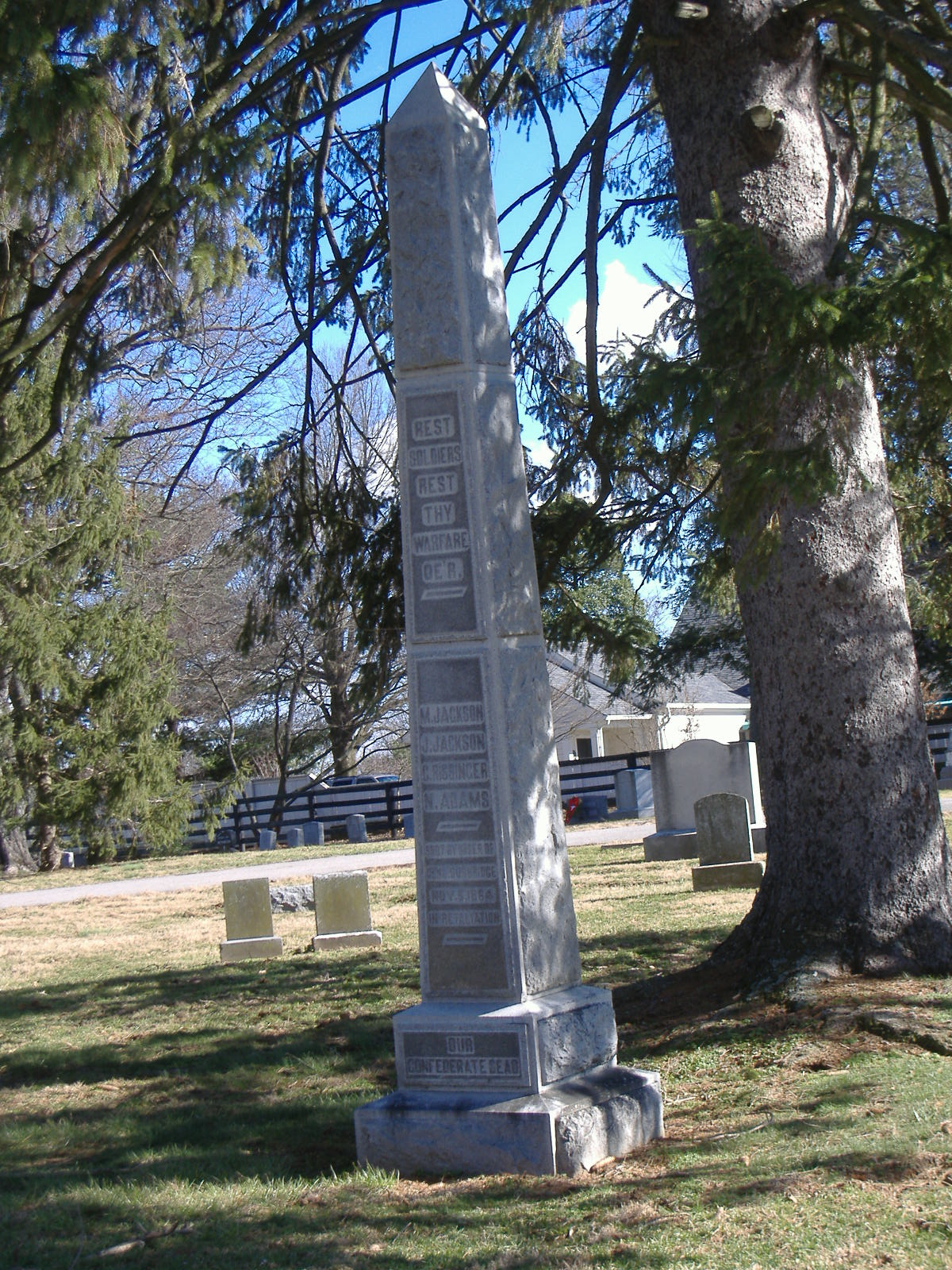

- Location within Kentucky Location within the United States
- Location: Midway, Kentucky
- Built: 1890
- MPS: Civil War Monuments of Kentucky MPS
- NRHP reference No.: 97000663
- Added to NRHP: July 17, 1997

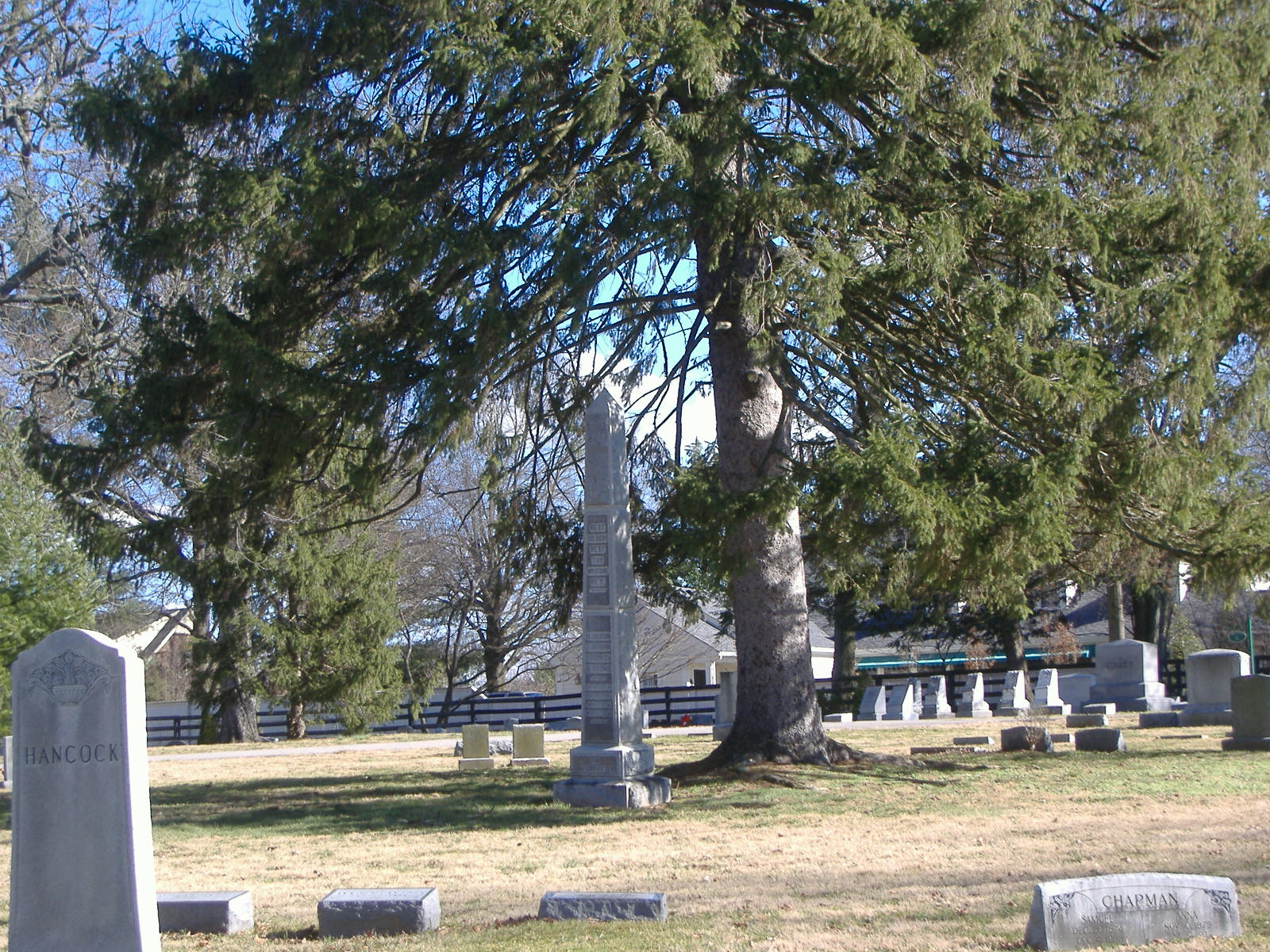
Distant shot of Martyrs Monument

The Martyrs Monument in Midway, located in Midway City Cemetery outside Midway, Kentucky, was placed on the National Register of Historic Places on July 17, 1997, as part of the Civil War Monuments of Kentucky Multiple Property Submission. It honors four Confederate prisoners who were killed due to the standing order of Union General over Kentucky Stephen G. Burbridge, known as Order No. 59, which declared: "Whenever an unarmed Union citizen is murdered, four guerrillas will be selected from the prison and publicly shot to death at the most convenient place near the scene of the outrages." The Confederate prisoners, whose names were M. Jackson, J. Jackson, C. Rissinger, and N. Adams, were executed on November 5, 1864, northeast of Midway, the precise location of which is unknown. This was due to the actions of Sue Mundy, a former trooper under John Hunt Morgan who terrorized Union forces in Kentucky during the later years of the American Civil War. They were buried in shallow graves originally, then re-buried in a Presbyterian cemetery, and finally in 1890 moved to their current location, with the dedication of the Martyrs Monument.

== History ==
Sue Mundy is said to have twice struck Midway in a span of two weeks, although some scholars believe that it may have just been men under Mundy, and not Mundy himself who participated (the very existence of Sue Mundy is in dispute). On October 22, 1864, six expensive thoroughbred horses were stolen, including one that was unbeaten in competition, named Asteroid. After a ransom was paid, Asteroid was returned to his owner, R.A. Alexander, ten days later. On November 1, 1864, on another raid to obtain horses for Confederate guerrillas, a shootout occurred, and Adam Harper Jr. was killed on his property. General Burbridge ordered four Confederates imprisoned in nearby Lexington shipped to Midway. On November 5, Burbridge had a firing squad of forty execute the Confederates in what was then the town of Midway's "commons", forcing local men to watch the event. The fallen prisoners were then buried in a shallow trench, but on the next day were reburied at the former Presbyterian Church gravesite, where they remained until the establishment of the monument in 1890.

There were two other events during the American Civil War at Midway. The first occurred on July 15, 1862, when John Hunt Morgan had his telegrapher George Ellsworth, aka "Lightning" Ellsworth, send a false telegraph message that Morgan was not in Midway, but instead was going to attack Frankfort, and then threaten Louisville, with a force more than twice what Morgan actually had at his command. The other was on February 2, 1865, when a few of Quantrill's Raiders burned the depot, robbed Midway citizens, and stole fifteen horses.

== Monument ==
The monument is a 15-foot-tall (4.6 m) obelisk made of granite. Other monuments to victims of Burbridge's Order No. 59, four in total, are the Confederate Soldiers Martyrs Monument in Eminence, the Confederate Martyrs Monument in Jeffersontown, and the Thompson and Powell Martyrs Monument.

== Inscription ==
Rest
soldiers
rest
Thy
warfare
Oe'r.
_____
M. Jackson
J. Jackson
G. Rissinger
N. Adams
_____
Shot by order of
Genl. Burbridge
Nov. 5, 1864
In Retaliation
_____
Our
Confederate Dead

== See also ==
- Midway Historic District
