= Thompson and Powell Martyrs Monument =

- U.S. National Register of Historic Places
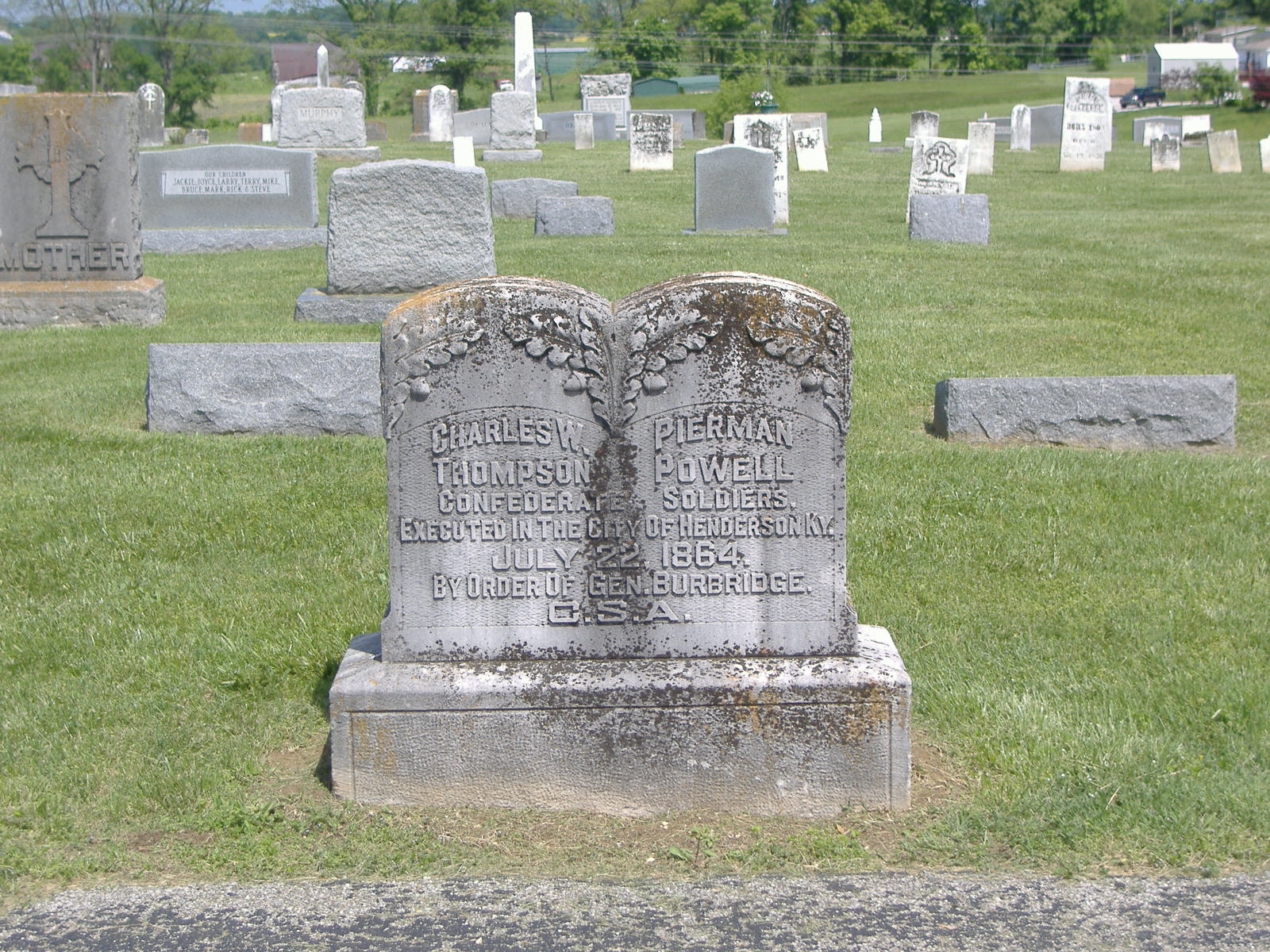

- Location within Kentucky Location within the United States
- Location: St. Joseph, Kentucky
- Built: 1880
- MPS: Civil War Monuments of Kentucky
- NRHP reference No.: 97000707
- Added to NRHP: July 17, 1997

The Thompson and Powell Martyrs Monument is a memorial to two Confederate soldiers in Saint Joseph, Kentucky. It is on the National Register of Historic Places (NRHP), the only NRHP location in Daviess County, Kentucky that is or was not in Owensboro, Kentucky.

== Executions ==
The memorial honors two Confederate soldiers who were killed in accordance with the standing order of the Union general in command of Kentucky, Stephen G. Burbridge, known as Order No. 59. This called for the execution of four Confederate prisoners for every unarmed Union civilian killed by the Confederates. The two men honored on the monument were Charles W. Thompson (aged 18) and Pierman Powell (aged 25), who were executed in retaliation for the fatal wounding of a prominent resident of Henderson, Kentucky, James E. Rankin. They were originally held in Daviess County, but were taken to Henderson by Federal troops to be killed. The two men were executed on July 22, 1864.

== Attempted rescue ==
Confederate Colonel Lee A. Sypert of the 16th Kentucky Cavalry (unofficially called the 13th Cavalry) tried to rescue the two men on July 21, using a bluff to draw away Union forces. However, the defenders held on until Union gunboats arrived, forcing Sypert to withdraw. The two Confederate prisoners were killed by firing squad on the banks of the Ohio River in Henderson, immediately after which the Union gunboats left the city, along with all the Union soldiers in the city.

Fearing retaliation, many of the Union-sympathizing citizens of Henderson fled the city, even though Sypert sent a proclamation to the city, stating:

...They are gone, and their murder is another crime added to the damnable catalogue of the despotism that rules you. We are Confederate soldiers. We fight for the liberty our sires bequeathed us. We have not made, nor will we make war upon citizens and women. Let not your people be excited by any further apprehension that we will disturb the peace of your community by the arrest of Union men, or of any interference with them unless they place themselves in the attitude of combatants. Such conduct would be cowardly, and we scorn it.

Like most monuments dedicated in the memory of the Confederacy, the letters CSA are at the bottom of the monument. Due to the placement of the lettering on the monument it is possible to misconstrue that Burbridge was a Confederate general, not a Union one. Burbridge spent years trying unsuccessfully to have those letters removed, as it angered him to have those letters after his name.

== National Register of Historic Places ==
On July 17, 1997, the Thompson and Powell Martyrs Monument was one of sixty-one different monuments related to the Civil War in Kentucky placed on the National Register of Historic Places, as part of the Civil War Monuments of Kentucky Multiple Property Submission. The Confederate Monument in Owensboro is the only other monument on the list in Daviess County. Other monuments to victims of Burbridge so honored are Confederate Martyrs Monument in Jeffersontown, Confederate Soldiers Martyrs Monument in Eminence, and Martyrs Monument in Midway.

== Gallery ==
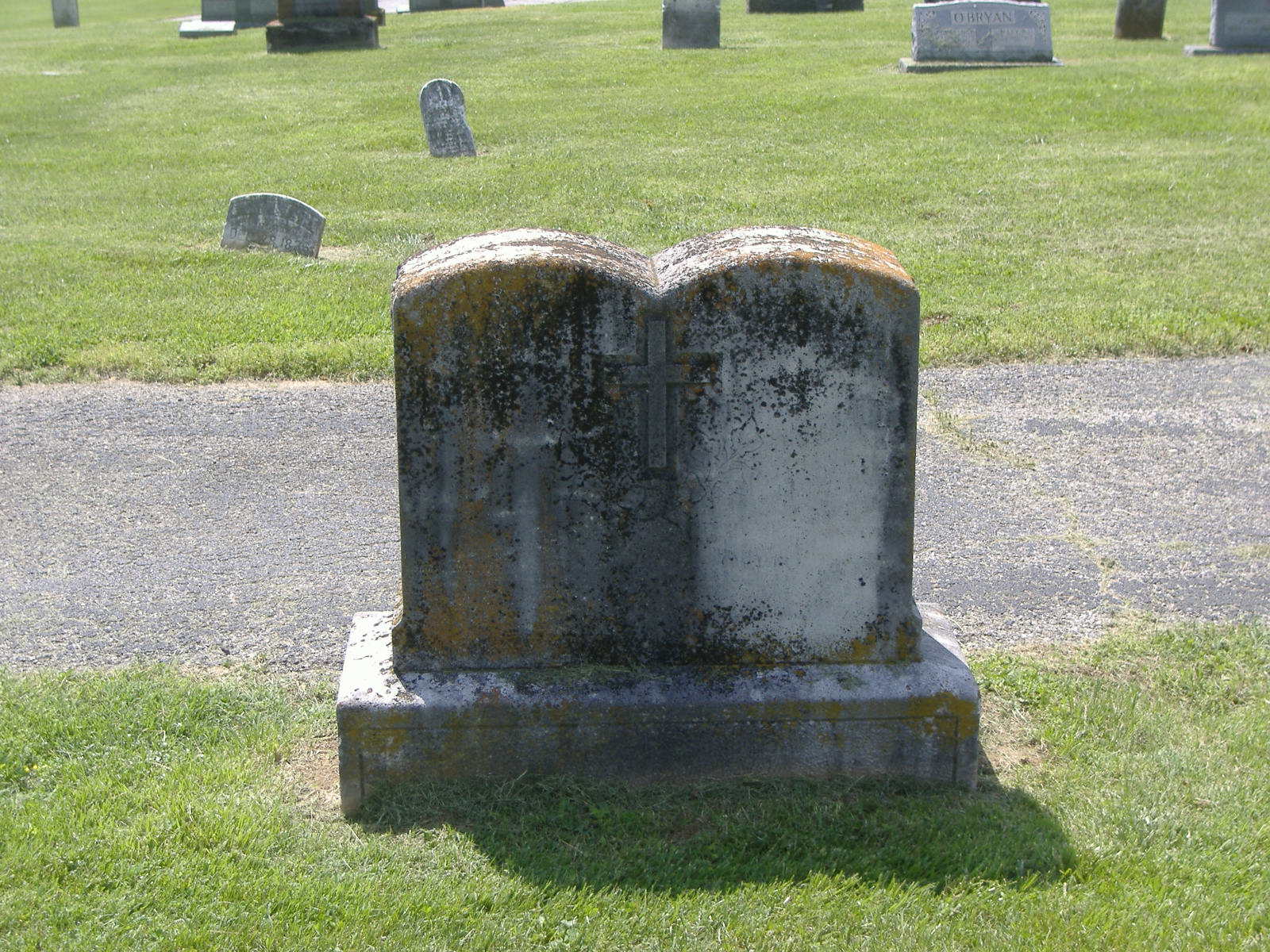
Back of monument

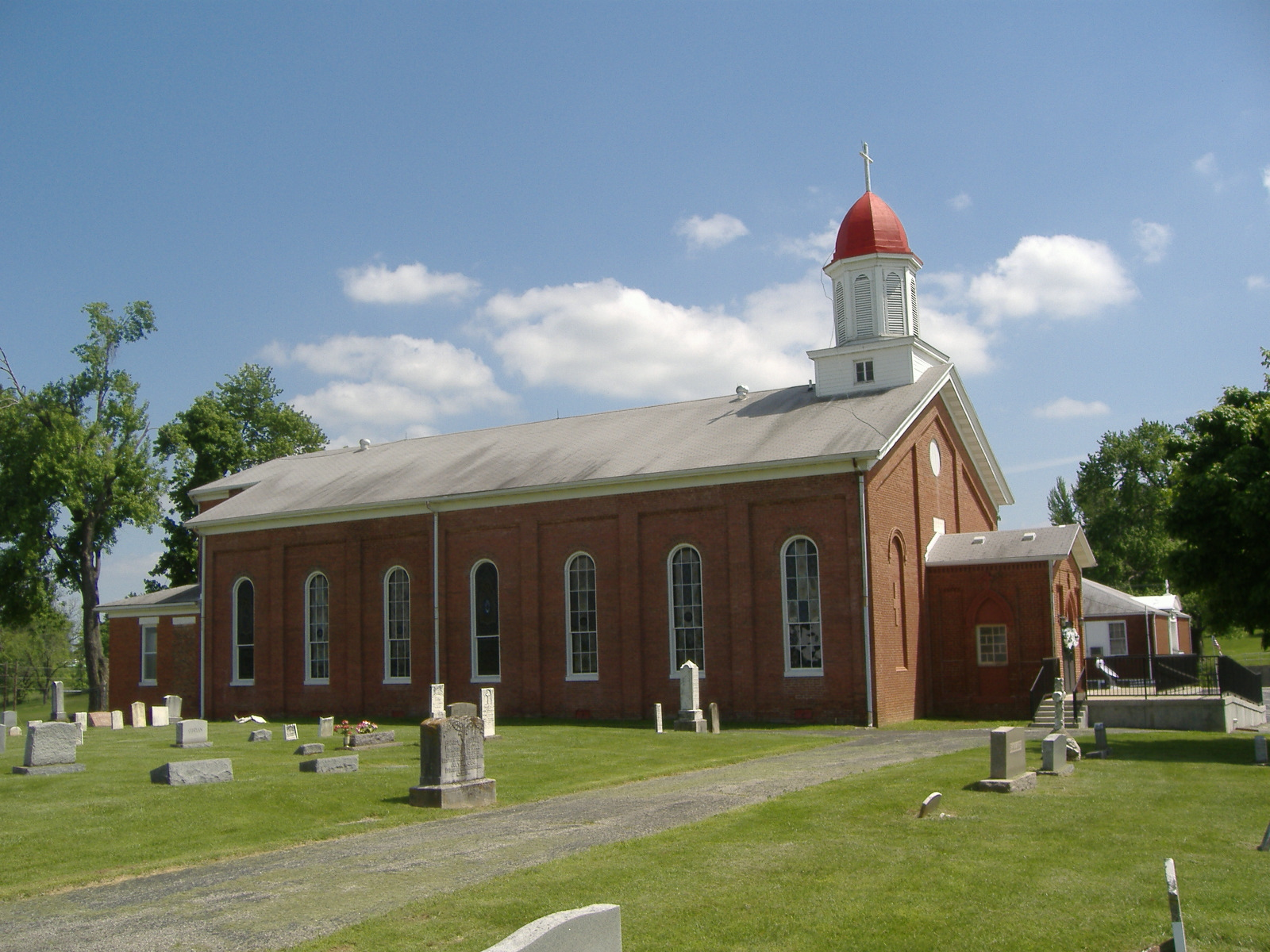
St. Alphonsus Catholic Church; the monument is in front of the church in this picture
