= List of American Civil War monuments in Kentucky =

This is a list of American Civil War monuments in Kentucky — Union, Confederate or both. The earliest Confederate memorials were, in general, simple memorials. The earliest such monument was the Confederate Monument in Cynthiana erected in 1869. Later monuments were more elaborate. In the late 19th century, Confederate monuments increasingly were focused on a "memorialization of the Lost Cause" and a "celebration of the Confederacy".

In 1997, 61 properties were added to the National Register of Historic Places as a result of a Multiple Property Submission (MPS). Two prominent monuments were not included in that MPS because they were already listed on the National Register. Although Kentucky produced more Union troops than Confederate troops (125,000 compared to 35,000), most of the monuments included in the MPS were dedicated to Confederate forces.

== List of American Civil War monuments in Kentucky ==
| | County | Monument name | Image | Year built | City or Town | Coordinates | Summary |
|---|---|---|---|---|---|---|---|
| 1 | Anderson | Confederate Monument in Lawrenceburg | | 1894 | Lawrenceburg | 38.035493°N 84.895527°W | Located on Lawrenceburg's Courthouse lawn |
| 2 | Barren | Confederate Monument in Glasgow | | 1905 | Glasgow | | Located on Glasgow's Courthouse lawn |
| 3 | Bath | Confederate Monument in Owingsville | | 1907 | Owingsville | | Located in Owingsville Cemetery. |
| 4 | Bourbon | Bourbon County Confederate Monument | | 1887 | Paris | 38°12′9″N 84°15′55″W | Only Monument on the list shaped like a chimney. |
| 5 | Boyle | Confederate Monument in Danville | | 1910 | Danville | 37°38′44″N 84°46′42″W | Located at the corner of Main and College Streets. |
| 6 | Boyle | Confederate Monument in Perryville | | 1902 | Perryville | | By the park office of Perryville Battlefield State Historic Site |
| 7 | Boyle | Union Monument in Perryville | | 1928 | Perryville | | By the park office of Perryville Battlefield State Historic Site |
| 8 | Boyle | Unknown Confederate Dead Monument in Perryville | | 1928 | Perryville | | Located in Goodknight Cemetery, a private family cemetery. |
| 9 | Bracken | Confederate Monument in Augusta | | 1903 | Augusta | 38°46′09.4″N 84°00′42.8″W | Gravesite of eight Confederates who died during a raid in the town |
| 10 | Butler | Confederate-Union Veterans' Monument in Morgantown | | 1907 | Morgantown | | One of two built in Kentucky dedicated in memory of both sides. |
| 11 | Caldwell | Confederate Soldier Monument in Caldwell | | 1912 | Princeton | | Located on the county courthouse lawn |
| 12 | Calloway | Confederate Monument in Murray | | 1917 | Murray | | One of four fountain monuments in Kentucky |
| 13 | Christian | Confederate Memorial Fountain in Hopkinsville | | 1911 | Hopkinsville | | One of four fountain monuments in Kentucky |
| 14 | Christian | Latham Confederate Monument | | 1887 | Hopkinsville | | In Riverside Cemetery |
| 15 | Daviess | Confederate Monument in Owensboro | | 1900 | Owensboro | | Sculpted by the noted George Julian Zolnay |
| 16 | Daviess | Thompson and Powell Martyrs Monument | | 1864 | St. Joseph | | In cemetery |
| 17 | Fayette | Confederate Soldier Monument in Lexington | | 1893 | Lexington | | |
| 18 | Fayette | John C. Breckinridge Memorial | | 1887 | Lexington | | Relocated from historic courthouse lawn to Lexington Cemetery October 2017 |
| 19 | Fayette | John Hunt Morgan Memorial | | 1911 | Lexington | | Dedicated to the hometown Confederate. Relocated to Lexington Cemetery in October 2017 |
| 20 | Fayette | Ladies' Confederate Memorial | | 1874 | Lexington | | |
| 21 | Franklin | Colored Soldiers Monument in Frankfort | | 1924 | Frankfort | | |
| 22 | Franklin | Confederate Monument in Frankfort | | 1892 | Frankfort | | |
| 23 | Fulton | Confederate Memorial in Fulton | | 1902 | Fulton | | |
| 24 | Fulton | Confederate Memorial Gateway in Hickman | | 1913 | Hickman | | Westernmost monument on the list |
| 25 | Graves | Camp Beauregard Memorial in Water Valley | | 1909 | Water Valley | | Site of a training camp where many Confederate died from disease. |
| 26 | Graves | Confederate Memorial Gates in Mayfield | | 1924 | Mayfield | | |
| 27 | Graves | Confederate Memorial in Mayfield | | 1920 | Mayfield | | One of four fountain monuments in Kentucky |
| 28 | Harrison | Confederate Monument in Cynthiana | | 1869 | Cynthiana | 38°23′09.80″N 84°16′50.00″W | The first Kentucky monument to the Confederate States of America, and the second one anywhere |
| 29 | Hart | Colonel Robert A. Smith Monument | | 1884 | Munfordville | | Largest confederate monument on private land. |
| 30 | Hart | Unknown Confederate Soldier Monument in Horse Cave | | 1934 | Horse Cave | | Only monument on the list composed of geodes |
| 31 | Henry | Confederate Soldiers Martyrs Monument in Eminence | | 1870 | Eminence | | |
| 32 | Jefferson | Adolph Bloedner Monument | | 1862 | Louisville | | Oldest monument in Kentucky |
| 33 | Jefferson | Confederate Martyrs Monument in Jeffersontown | | 1904 | Jeffersontown | 38°11′31″N 85°34′06″W | |
| 35 | Jefferson | John B. Castleman Monument | | 1913 | Louisville | | |
| 36 | Jefferson | Union Monument in Louisville | | 1914 | Louisville | | |
| 37 | Jessamine | Confederate Memorial in Nicholasville | | 1896 | Nicholasville | | |
| 38 | Kenton | GAR Monument in Covington | | 1929 | Covington | | Northernmost monument on the list |
| 39 | Kenton | Veteran's Monument in Covington | | 1933 | Covington | | One of only two monuments in Kentucky meant to honor both sides |
| 40 | Lewis | Union Monument in Vanceburg | | 1884 | Vanceburg | | Limestone monument erected by the citizens of the county as a memorial to the men of the county who were killed in action while fighting for the Union. This is the easternmost monument on the list and the first one to be erected in a public place. |
| 41 | Lincoln | Confederate Monument at Crab Orchard | | 1872 | Crab Orchard | | |
| 42 | Logan | Confederate Monument in Russellville | | 1910 | Russellville | | Near where the Confederate government of Kentucky was established |
| 43 | Marion | Captain Andrew Offutt Monument | | 1921 | Lebanon | | Second strongest sentiment to the Union of all the Kentucky monuments |
| 44 | McCracken | Confederate Monument in Paducah | | 1907 | Paducah | | |
| 45 | McCracken | Lloyd Tilghman Memorial | | 1909 | Paducah | | |
| 34 | Meade | Confederate Monument in Louisville | | 1895 | Brandenburg | | Originally located by the University of Louisville; relocated in 2017 to Brandenburg. |
| 46 | Mercer | Beriah Magoffin Monument | | 1900 | Harrodsburg | | At the gravesite of Beriah Magoffin, who was Kentucky's governor when war was declared. |
| 47 | Mercer | Confederate Monument in Harrodsburg | | 1902 | Harrodsburg | | |
| 48 | Montgomery | Confederate Monument of Mt. Sterling | | 1880 | Mt. Sterling | | |
| 49 | Nelson | Confederate Monument of Bardstown | | 1903 | Bardstown | 37°49′27.76″N 85°27′41.61″W | |
| 50 | Oldham | Confederate Memorial in Pewee Valley | | 1904 | Pewee Valley | | Within the Pewee Valley Confederate Cemetery |
| 51 | Pulaski | Battle of Dutton's Hill Monument | | 1875 | Somerset | 37°07.048′N 84°35.838′W | |
| 52 | Pulaski | Confederate Mass Grave Monument in Somerset | | 1910 | Somerset | | |
| 53 | Pulaski | General Felix K. Zollicoffer Monument | | 1910 | Nancy | | |
| 54 | Scott | Confederate Monument in Georgetown | | 1888 | Georgetown | | |
| 55 | Taylor | Battle of Tebb's Bend Monument | | 1872 | Campbellsville | | |
| 56 | Trigg | Confederate Monument | | 1913 | Cadiz | | One of four fountain monuments in Kentucky |
| 57 | Union | Confederate Monument of Morganfield | | 1870 | Morganfield | | Isolated from most of cemetery. |
| 58 | Warren | Confederate Monument of Bowling Green | | 1876 | Bowling Green | | |
| 59 | Warren | William F. Perry Monument | | 1901 | Bowling Green | | |
| 60 | Woodford | Confederate Monument in Versailles | | 1877 | Versailles | | |
| 61 | Woodford | Martyrs Monument in Midway | | 1890 | Midway | | |

== See also ==
- Jefferson Davis State Historic Site, An obelisk honoring Jefferson Davis listed in 1973.
