= Haphazard =

Haphazard may refer to:

- Haphazard (Owensboro, Kentucky), historic house
- Haphazard, play by James A. Herne 1879
- Haphazard: a tale of Youth, novel by William Francis Casey 1917
- Haphazard (album), S. J. Tucker album released in 2004
- Sir Abraham Haphazard, a fictional character in the novel The Warden by Anthony Trollope, published in 1855
