= Unknown Confederate Soldier Monument in Horse Cave =

Civil War memorial in Hart County, Kentucky

- U.S. National Register of Historic Places
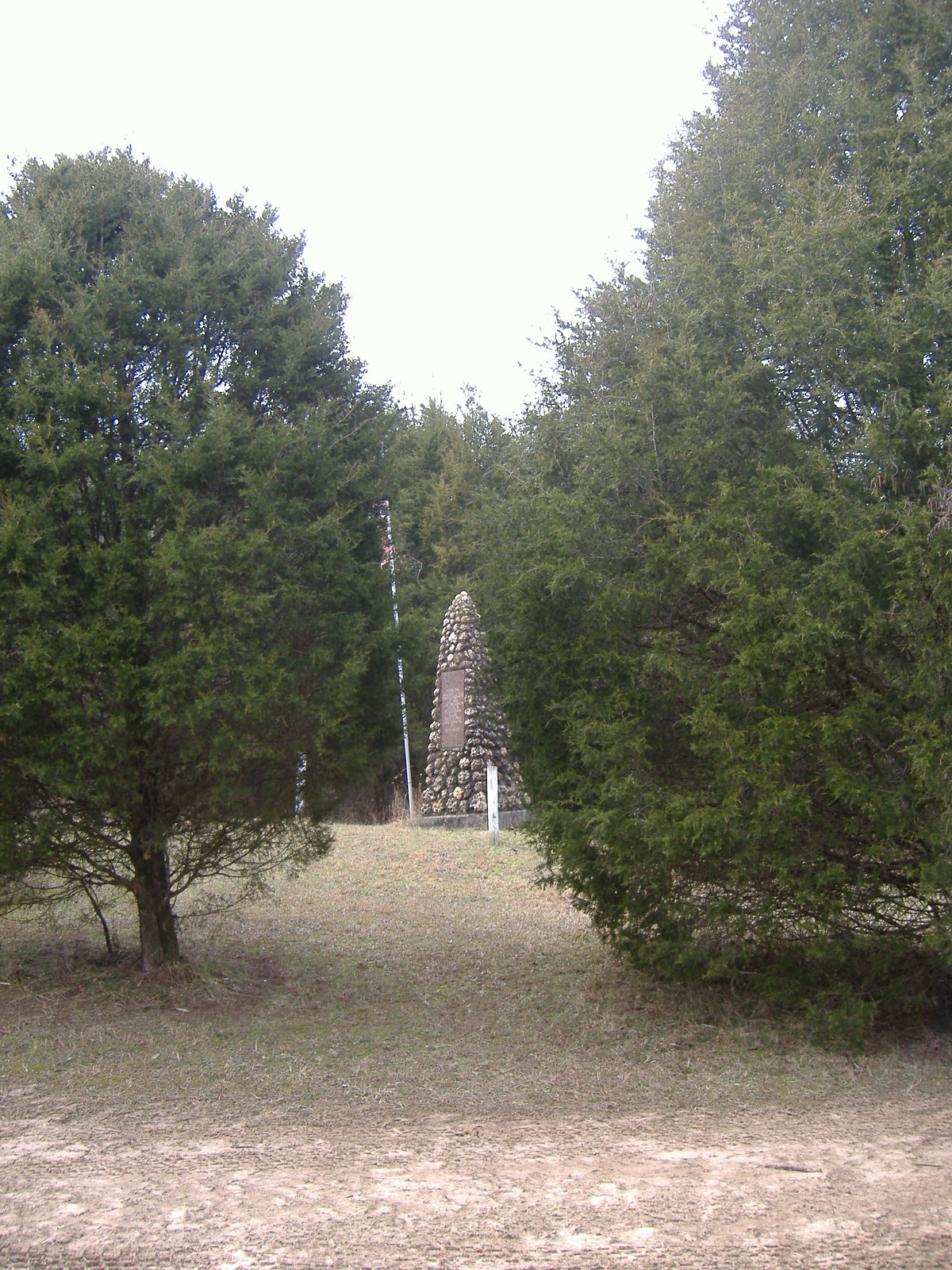
- Street view of the monument

- Location within Kentucky Location within the United States
- Nearest city: Horse Cave, Kentucky
- Built: 1934
- Architect: Sam Lively
- MPS: Civil War Monuments of Kentucky
- NRHP reference No.: 97000694
- Added to NRHP: July 17, 1997

The Unknown Confederate Soldier Monument in Horse Cave is a monument between Horse Cave, Kentucky and Kentucky Down Under, off the main road between Horse Cave and I-65 on the Old Dixie Highway, in Hart County, Kentucky, United States.

Among the various monuments of the Civil War Monuments of Kentucky Multiple Property Submission, all of which became part of the National Register of Historic Places on July 17, 1997, it is an oddity for several reasons. First, though meant to imply an obelisk, it was constructed of local materials by a single individual. It was built during the Great Depression in the year 1934, long after most monuments to the American Civil War. Instead of the typical limestone and marble from which most monuments were made, the monument uses geodes from Tennessee, sedimentary/volcanic rocks in which crystals fill a largely hollow interior. The monument is 12 feet high, with a base of five feet square. The monument honors an unknown foot soldier from the 11th Louisiana Infantry, who died prior to the Battle of Munfordville. He was part of a tree-cutting detail. Ordered to rest, he lay down beside a tree. His loaded rifle accidentally discharged when it struck a tree branch; the bullet entered his head below his chin and killed him instantly. The soldier was buried with rocks marking his head and feet. Years later, a wire fence was placed around the grave.

Local tradition says that a man named Sam Lively built the monument, fearing otherwise the grave would become lost.

The monument is technically on private property, but a path through the evergreen trees allows visitors access. A Confederate Naval Jack flies beside the monument.

The Inscription says:

Unknown Soldier C. S. A. was a member of Gen. Clay Anderson division 11th. Louisiana Killed Sept. 9, 1862 Erected 1934 by Sam Lively

== Gallery ==
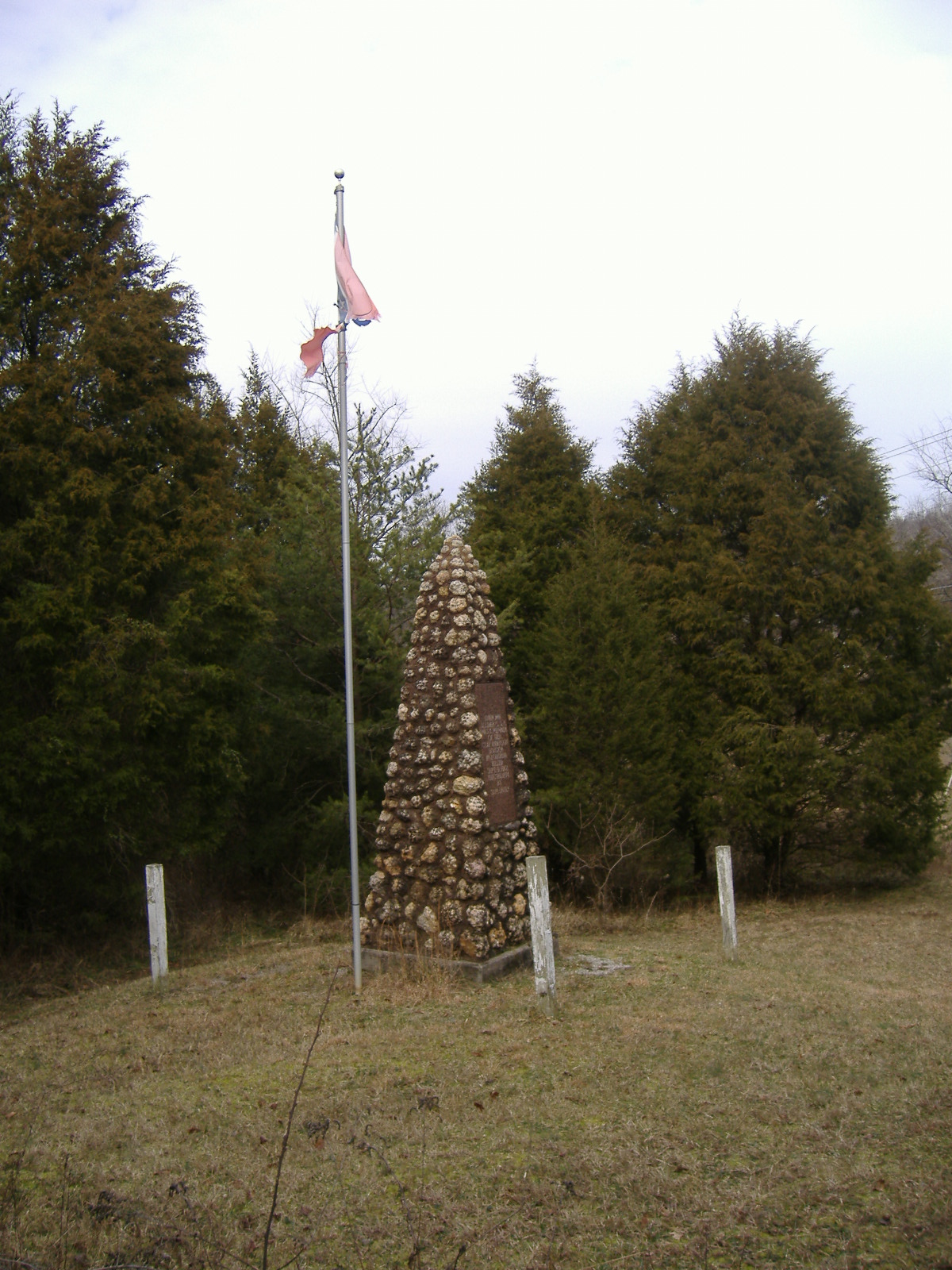
Side view

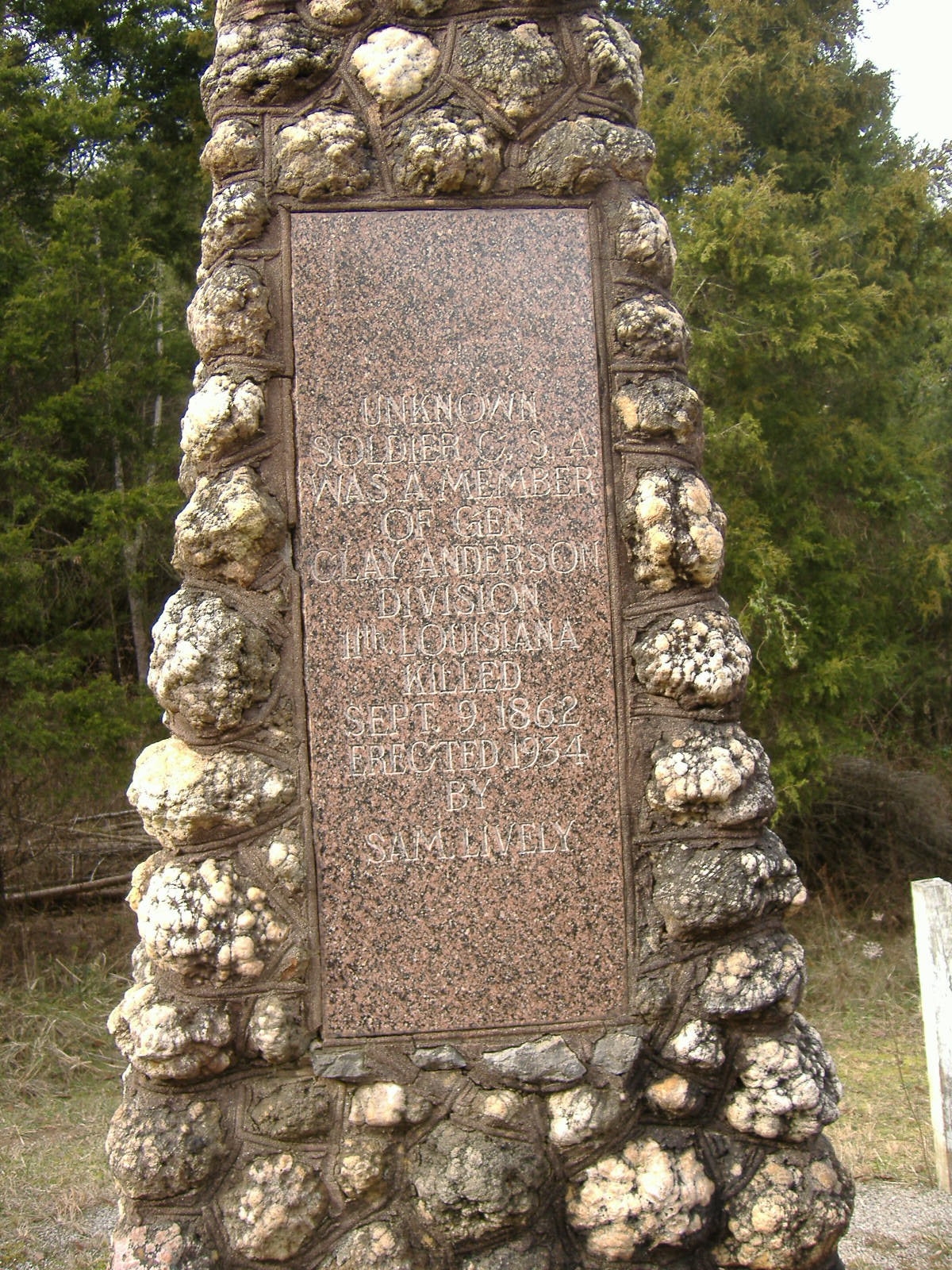
Inscription on marker

Straight view
