= Confederate Monument in Versailles =

- U.S. National Register of Historic Places
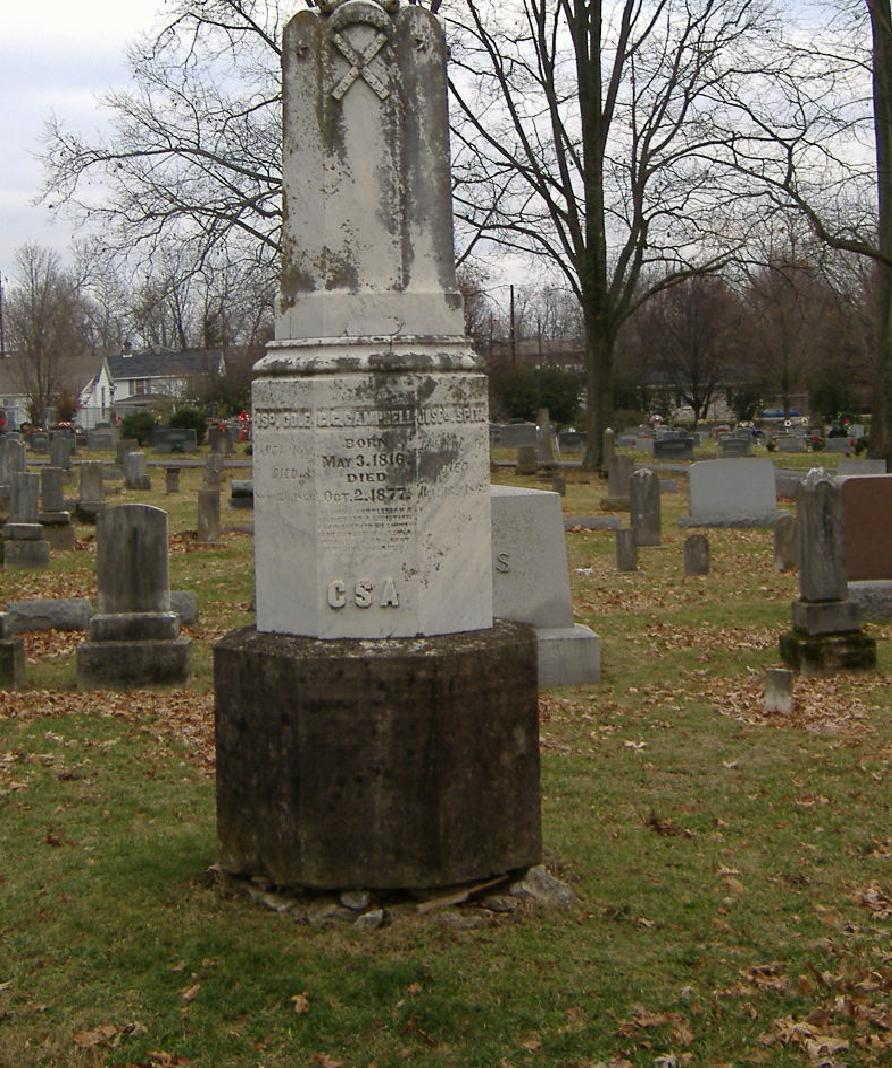

- Location within Kentucky Location within the United States
- Location: Versailles, Kentucky
- MPS: Civil War Monuments of Kentucky MPS
- NRHP reference No.: 97000662
- Added to NRHP: July 17, 1997

The Confederate Monument, in the city cemetery of Versailles, Kentucky, was placed on the National Register of Historic Places on July 17, 1997, as part of the Civil War Monuments of Kentucky MPS.

The monument, with its unique shape, was made of white marble and put on a base of concrete and limestone. It was erected in 1877. Names of Confederate veterans are on each side of the hexagon, with graves encircling it.

== Gallery ==
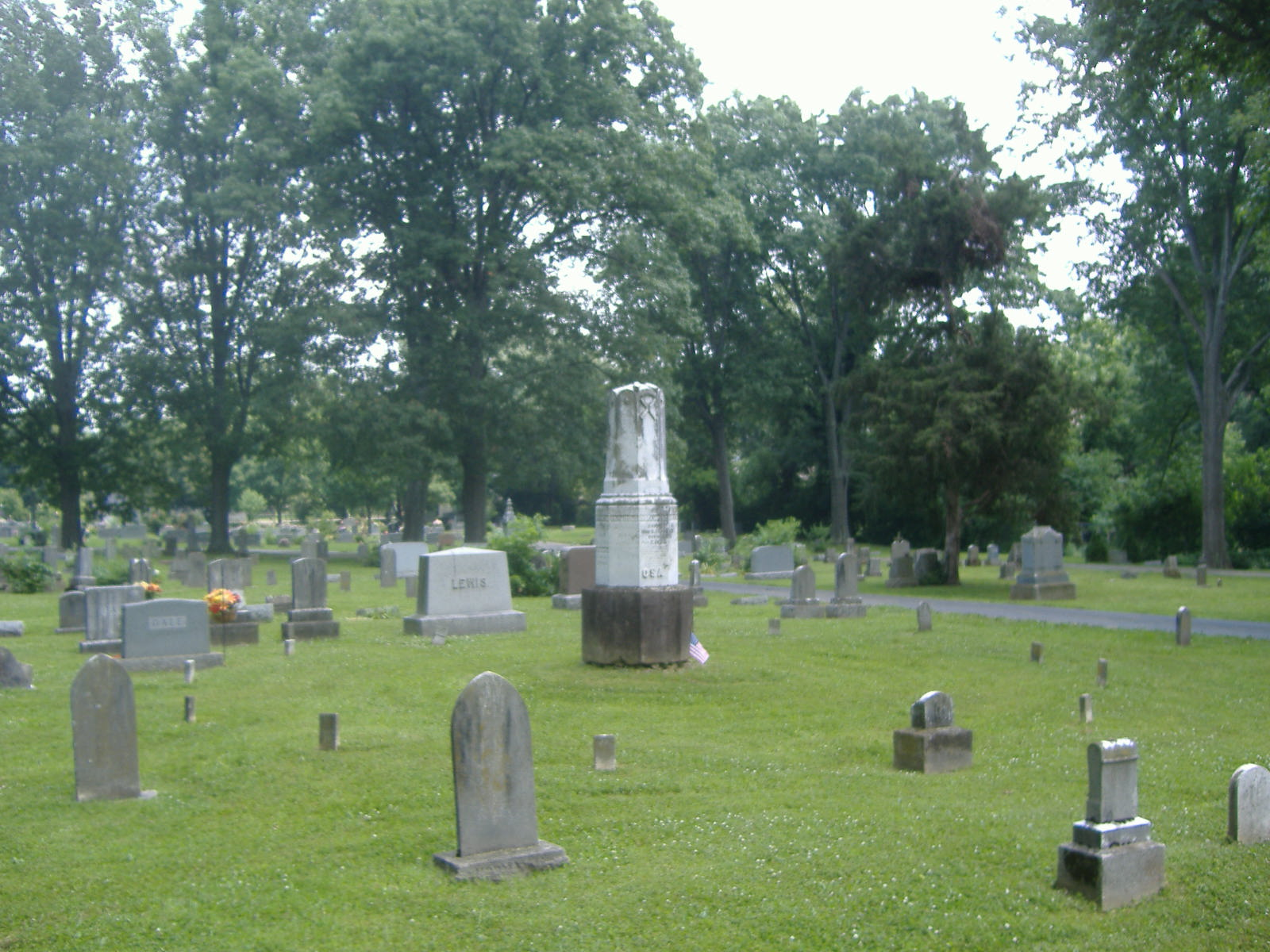
Front view from a distance

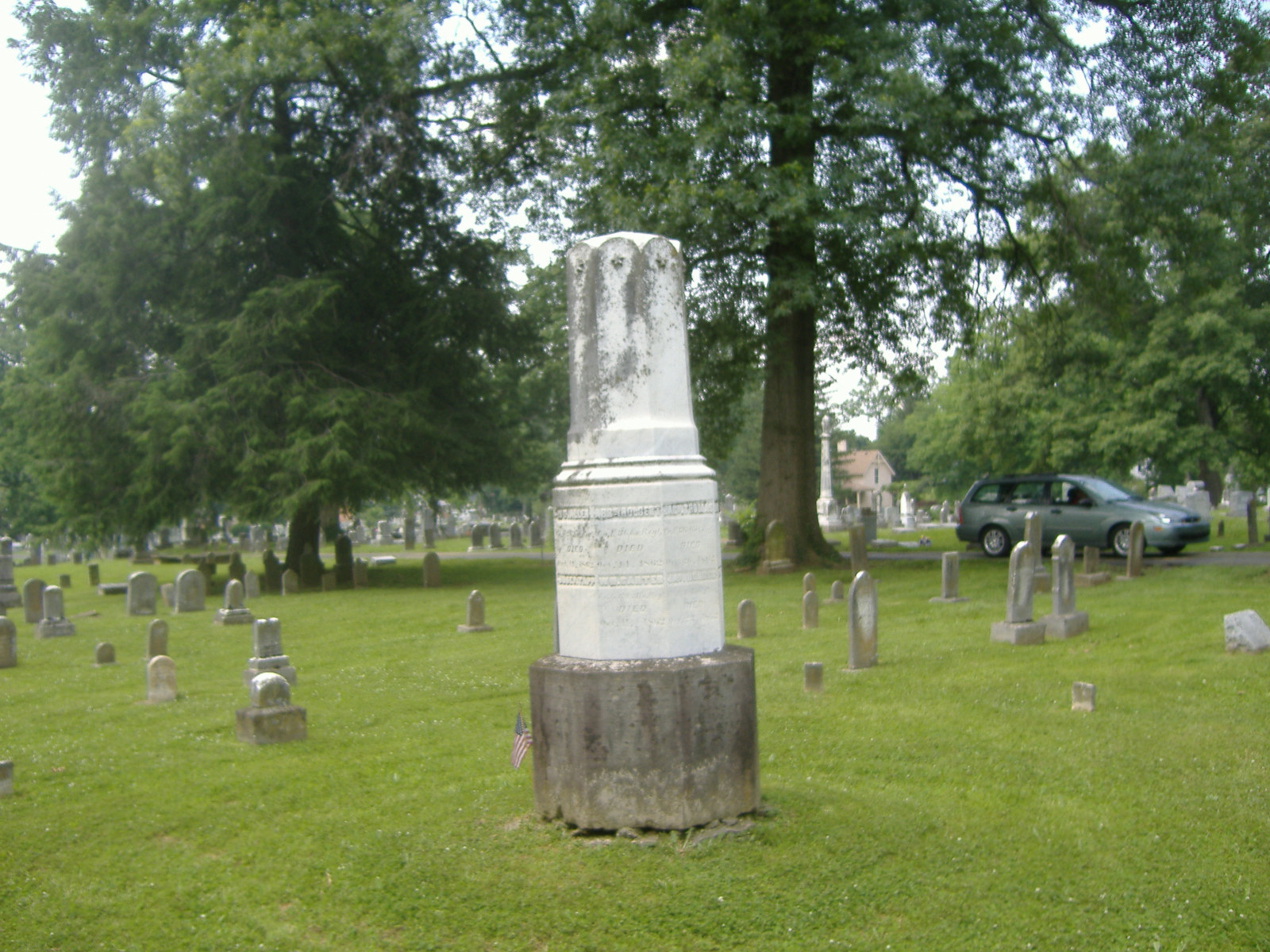
Back view
