= Confederate Monument in Augusta =

Coordinates: 38°46′09.4″N 84°00′42.8″W

- U.S. National Register of Historic Places
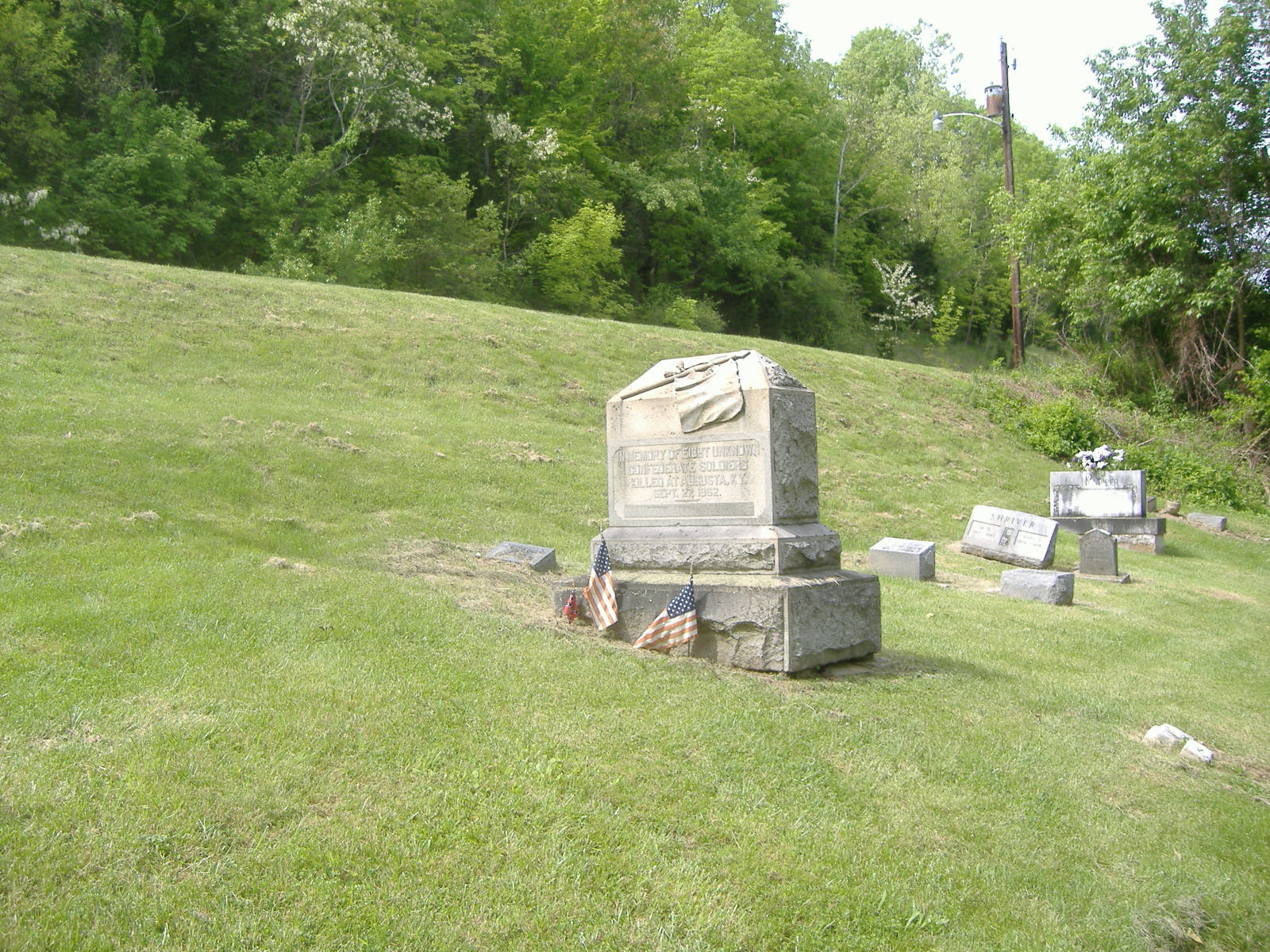

- Location within Kentucky Location within the United States
- Location: Payne Cemetery, N of KY 8, Augusta, Kentucky
- Built: 1903
- MPS: Civil War Monuments of Kentucky MPS
- NRHP reference No.: 97000715
- Added to NRHP: July 17, 1997

The Confederate Monument in Bracken County, Kentucky, in Augusta, Kentucky, honors eight unknown Confederate soldiers who were killed attacking Augusta in September 1862. Confederate Colonel Basil W. Duke led a force of Confederate soldiers to raid the town, on September 27, 1862, only to be driven back by a home guard force numbering 100 and backed up by gunboats. Eight Confederate soldiers of the 21 who died were buried in Payne Cemetery. In 1903 the present monument was placed at their burial spot.

The monument is a granite tombstone four feet high with a base three feet wide. At the top of the tombstone is the Confederate battle flag. The stone was placed where the unknown soldiers were buried, forty-one years after the skirmish in which they were killed. The John B. Hood Camp of the United Confederate Veterans was responsible for the funding for the monument, which totaled $550.

On July 17, 1997, the Confederate Monument in Augusta was one of sixty-one different monuments related to the Civil War in Kentucky placed on the National Register of Historic Places, as part of the Civil War Monuments of Kentucky Multiple Property Submission. It is the most northerly of the monuments on the list that honor only Confederates; the Veteran's Monument in Covington to the north honors both sides.

The monument is best reached from the parking area by the flagpole on the river side of Kentucky State Road 8 west of town by descending the nearby stairs. The only other route involves walking across private yards and then up a steep 100 foot hill through Payne Cemetery.

== Gallery ==
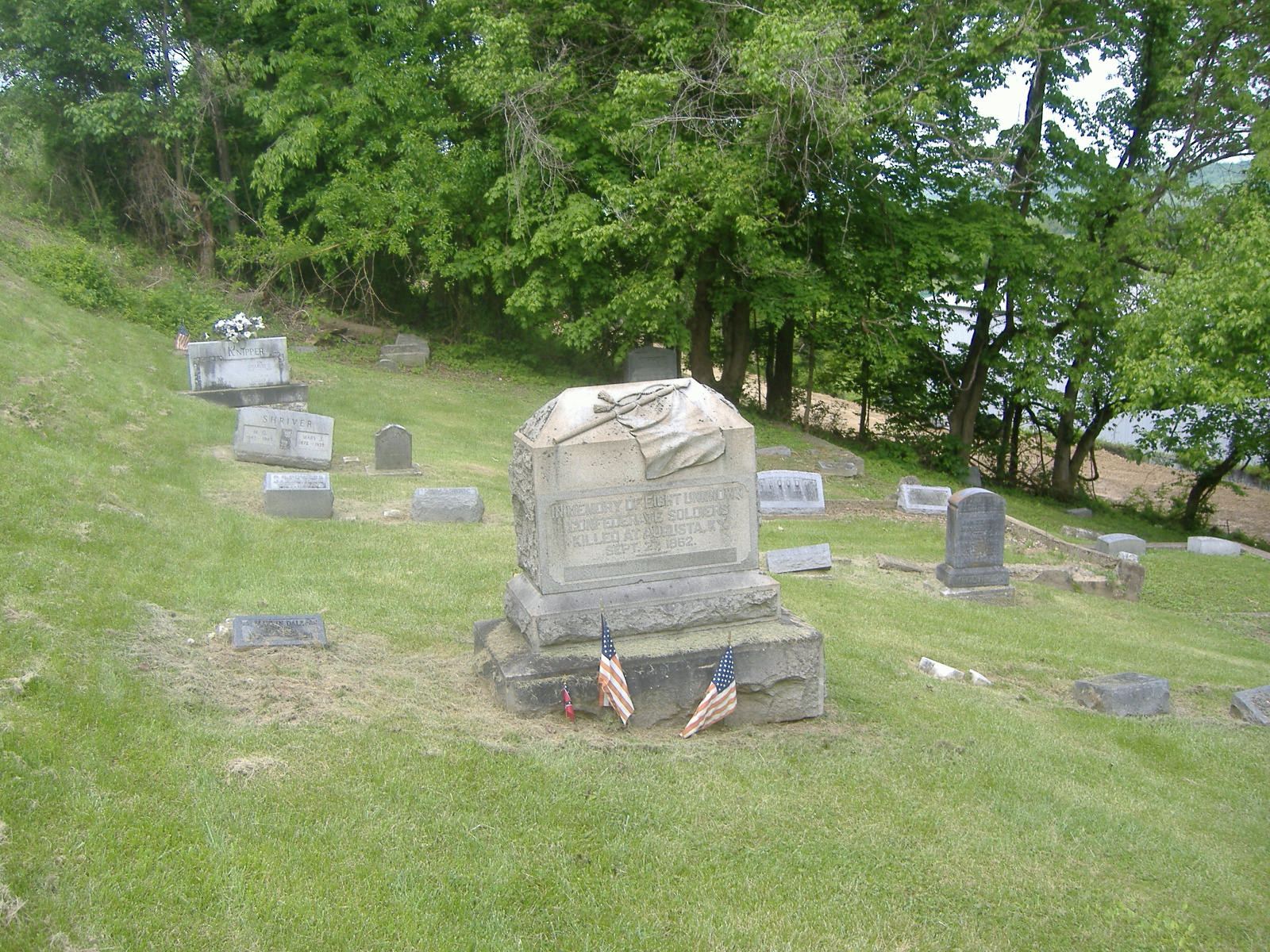
Alternative view

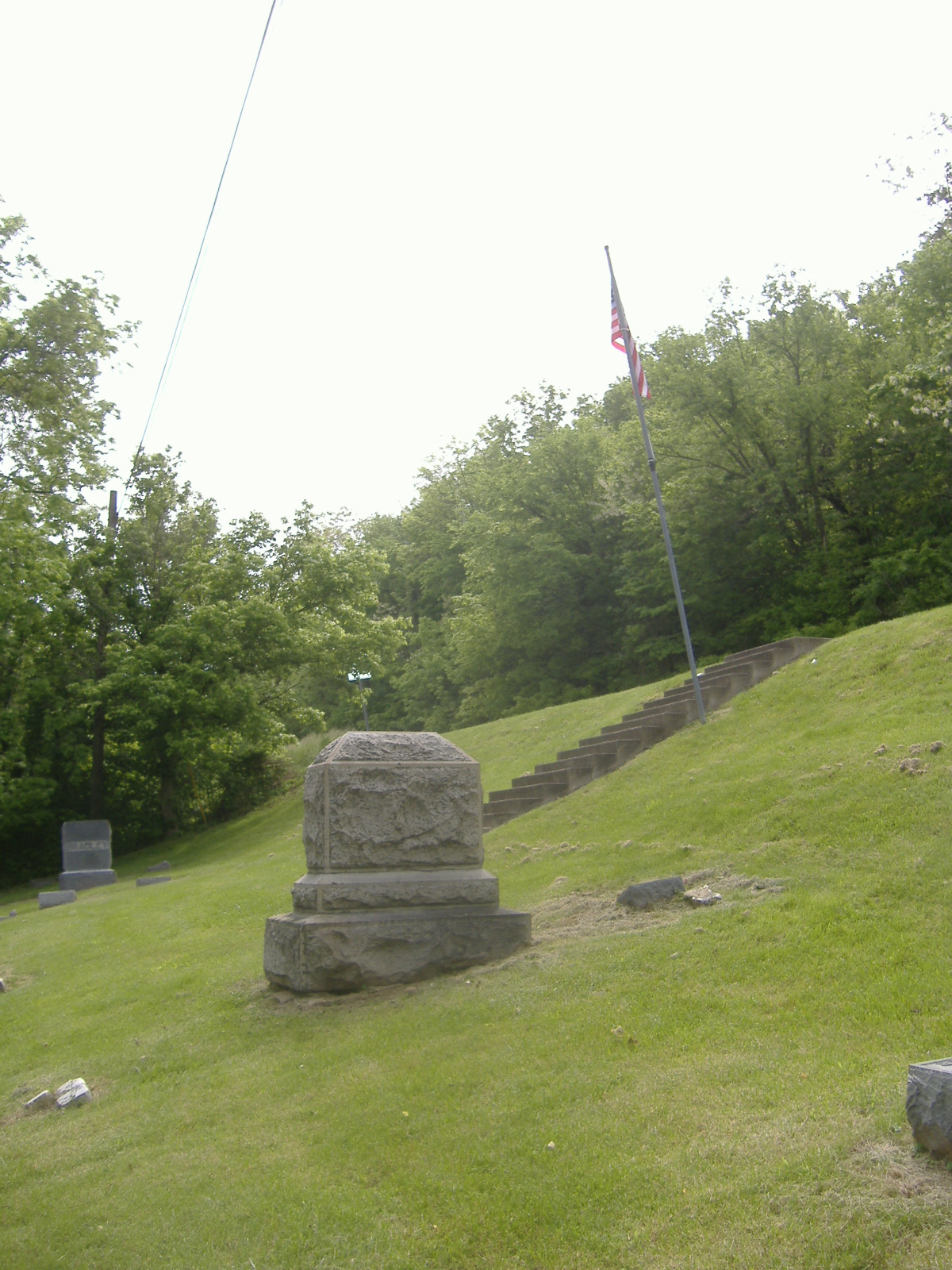
Back of monument

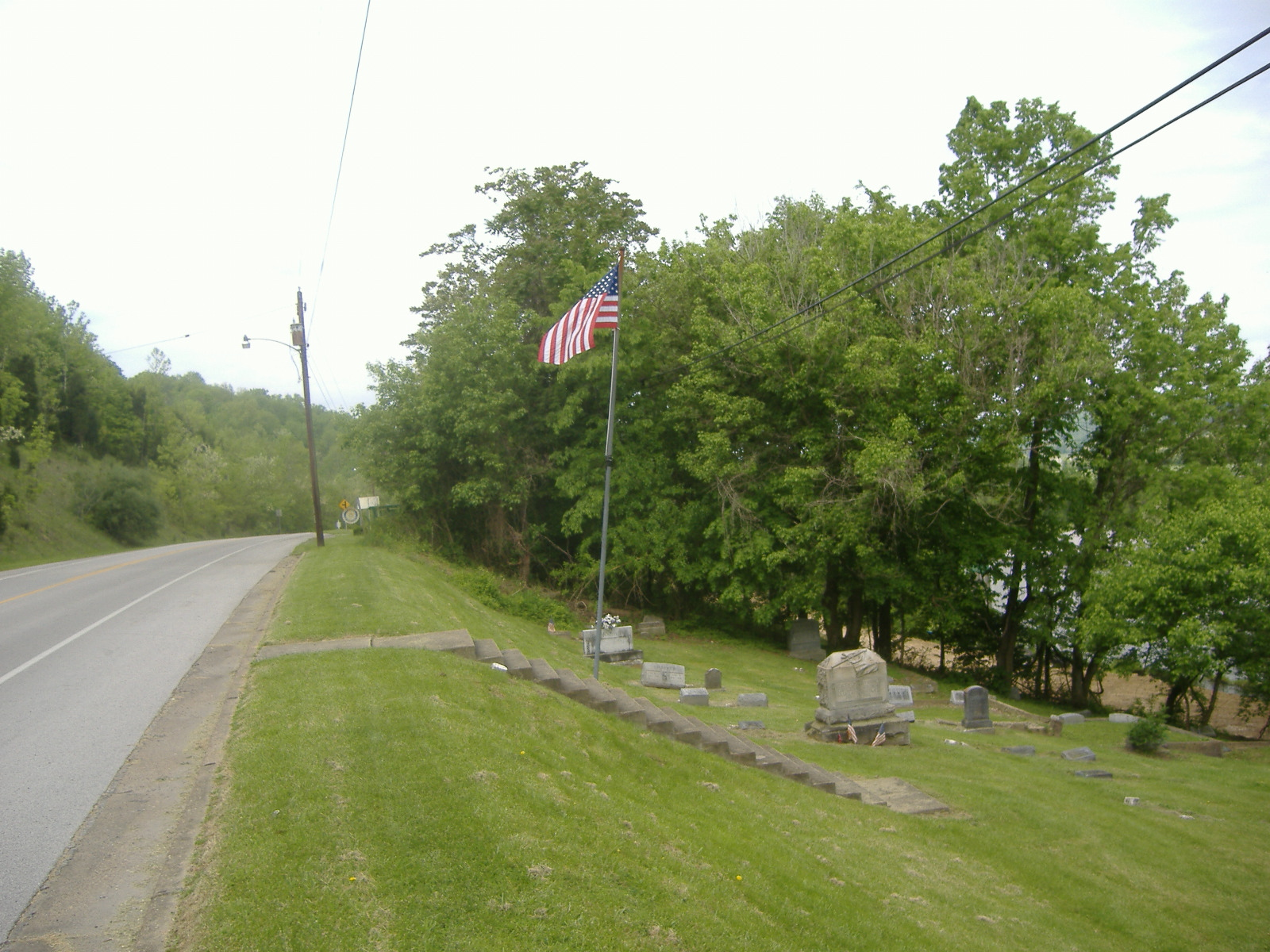
Roadside parking for the monument
