= Confederate Monument in Glasgow =

- U.S. National Register of Historic Places
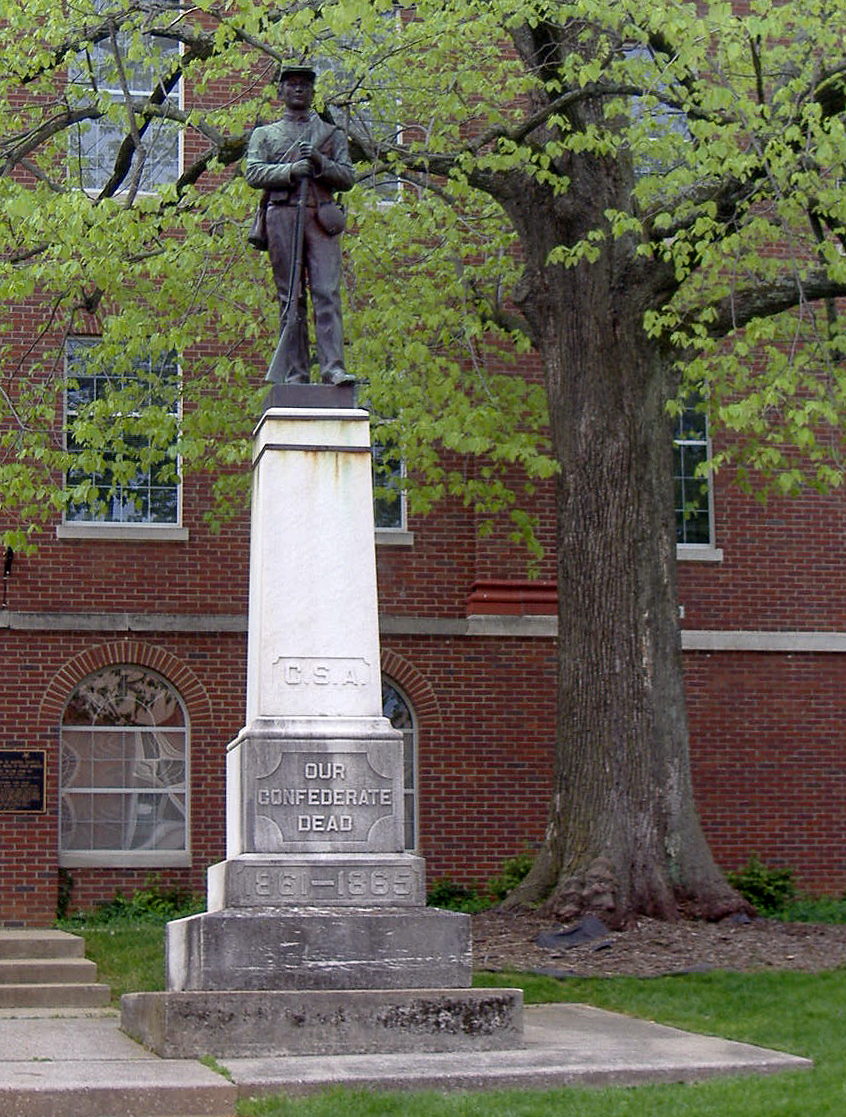

- Location within Kentucky Location within the United States
- Location: Glasgow, Kentucky
- Coordinates: 36°59′44″N 85°54′45″W
- Built: 1905
- MPS: Civil War Monuments of Kentucky MPS
- NRHP reference No.: 97000717
- Added to NRHP: July 17, 1997

The Confederate Monument in Glasgow, Kentucky, built in 1905 by the Kentucky Women's Monumental Association and former Confederate soldier John A. Murray, commemorates those who gave their lives in service for the Confederate States of America. It is located on the side of Glasgow's courthouse. The Confederate soldier, made of bronze, is at parade rest, and features details such as a bedroll, canteen, kepi hat, and rifle. It stands on a limestone pedestal.

Glasgow saw much action in 1862. John Hunt Morgan twice raided through the city. The most notable was Christmas Eve, when some of Morgan's men under Captain Thomas Quirk sought to celebrate the holiday at a tavern in Glasgow, which the Union 2nd Michigan Cavalry also did, leading to a skirmish. Two Union and Three Confederate soldiers were killed, and the Union cavalry retreated to Cave City, leaving Glasgow in Morgan's hands. Braxton Bragg went through the town on his way to capturing Kentucky's capital of Frankfort and the Battle of Perryville.

The President of the Confederacy, Jefferson Davis, gave a Medal of Honor to one enlisted man in every company that gave the Confederacy a "signal victory". With seven such men, Barren County, whose county seat is Glasgow, had more such medalists than any other county in the Commonwealth of Kentucky. Four of these came from the Battle of Stone's River, and three were from the Battle of Chickamauga; both battles were fought in Tennessee, not Kentucky. It was remembering this valor of his fellow Confederate soldiers who hailed from Barren County that Nelson County native John A. Murray had the Confederate Monument in Glasgow built, with the help of a ladies association.

On July 17, 1997, it was one of sixty different monuments to the Civil War in Kentucky placed on the National Register of Historic Places, as part of the Civil War Monuments of Kentucky Multiple Property Submission. Twenty-three of these monuments, including Glasgow's, had cast soldiers as part of the memorial, and Glasgow's is one of ten such soldier monuments in Kentucky that is on a courthouse lawn.
