= Confederate Monument in Georgetown =

Monument in Georgetown, Kentucky, US

- U.S. National Register of Historic Places
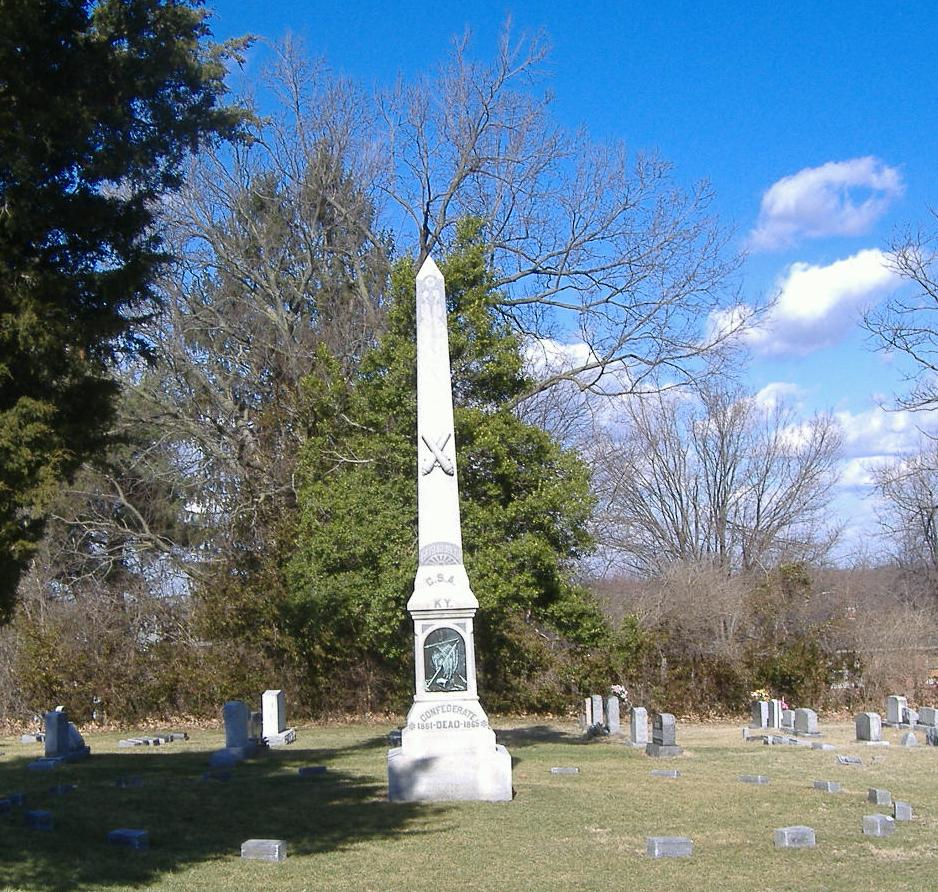

- Location within Kentucky Location within the United States
- Location: Georgetown, Kentucky
- Built: 1888
- MPS: Civil War Monuments of Kentucky MPS
- NRHP reference No.: 97000669
- Added to NRHP: July 17, 1997

The Confederate Monument in Georgetown is within the Georgetown Cemetery of Georgetown, Kentucky. It is an unpolished granite obelisk that is twenty feet tall, surrounded by the graves of eighteen former Confederate soldiers. The various reliefs upon the obelisk include crossed cannons, crossed muskets, a drum, an azid, and flags. It was placed on the National Register of Historic Places on July 17, 1997, as part of the Civil War Monuments of Kentucky Multiple Property Submission.

The dedication of the monument took place in June 1888. The Ladies Monument Association, in association with the women of Scott County, Kentucky, was responsible for the attainment of the funds necessary to erect the monument. They had eighteen fallen Confederates, from graves around the county, reinterred around the monument, in a manner similar to other such monuments in Kentucky. Two of these were victims of Stephen G. Burbridge's Order 59, which called for the killing of four Confederate prisoners of war whenever one Union civilian was killed. The dedication was presided by Dr. John A. Lewis, with a parade preceding the dedication containing thousands from around the state of Kentucky.

Scott County had provided 1,000 troops for the Confederacy, while only providing 118 men to the Union Army.

== Gallery ==
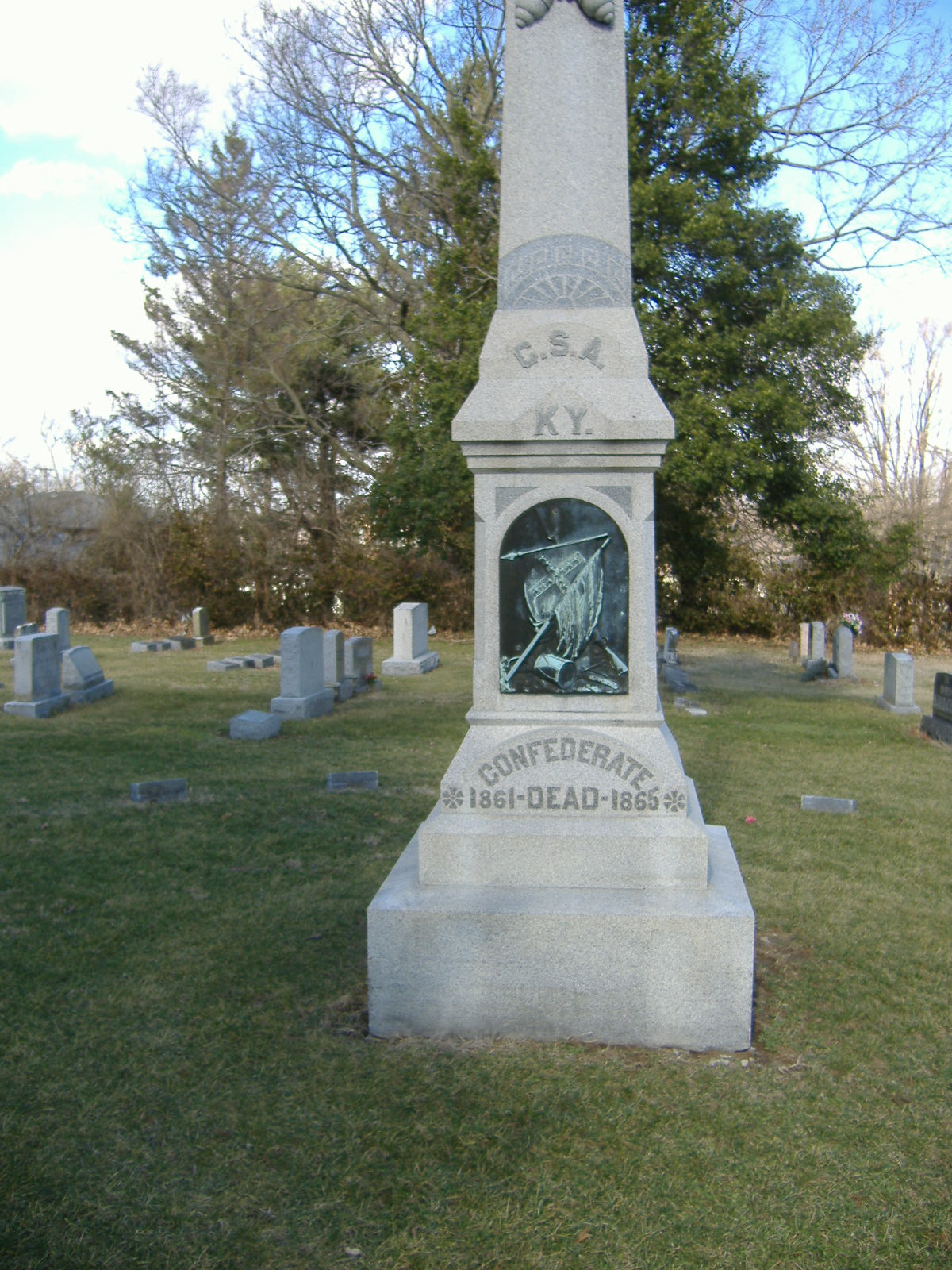
Closeup of the flag relief
