= Confederate Monument of Morganfield =

- U.S. National Register of Historic Places
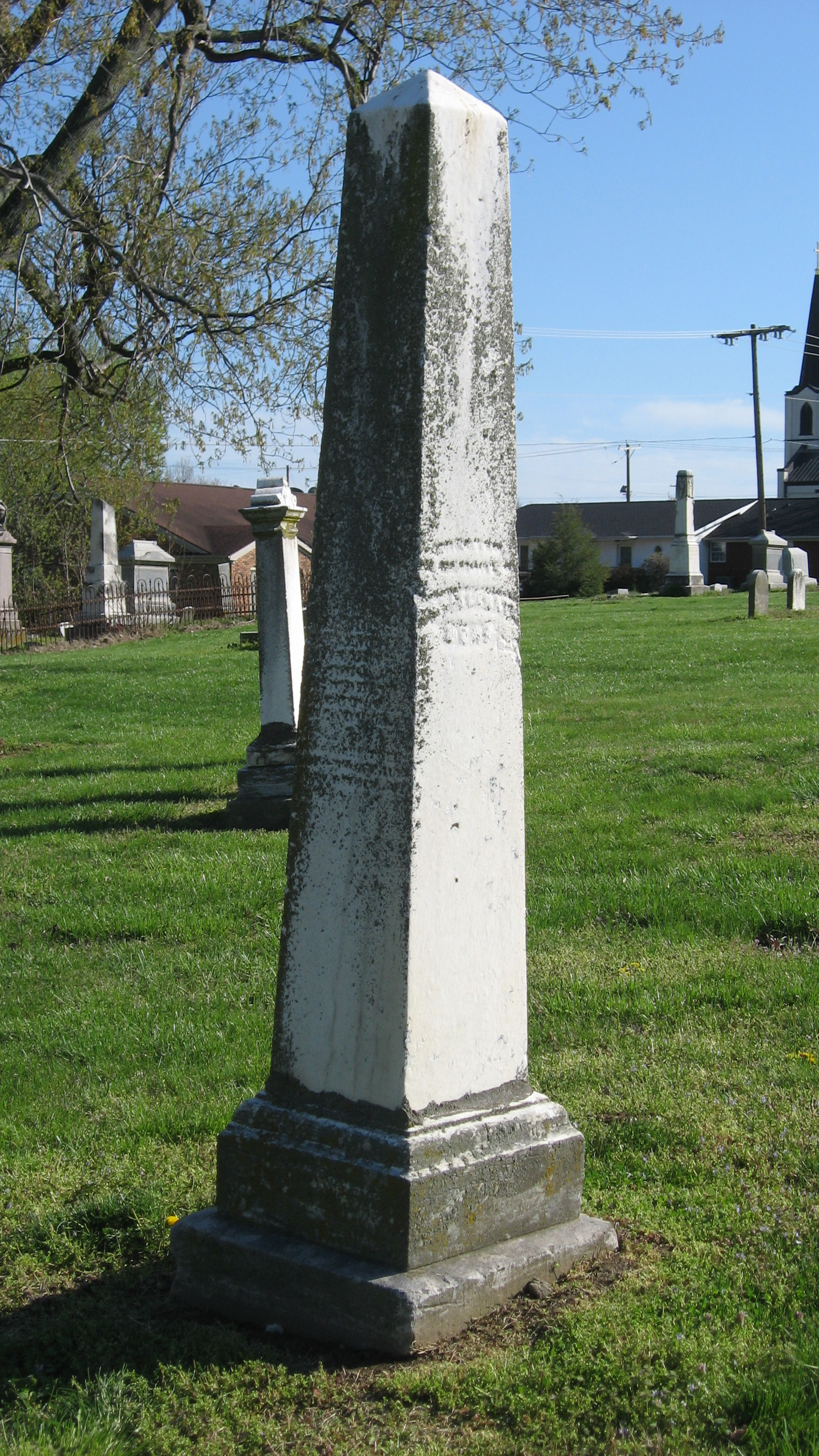

- Location within Kentucky Location within the United States
- Location: Morganfield, Kentucky
- Built: 1870
- MPS: Civil War Monuments of Kentucky MPS
- NRHP reference No.: 97000666
- Added to NRHP: July 17, 1997

The Confederate Monument of Morganfield, Kentucky is a monument to Confederate soldiers from surrounding Union County, Kentucky, of which Morganfield is the county seat. It is in the easternmost corner of the Masonic Cemetery just outside downtown Morganfield. During the War "Union" County was mostly a Confederate-sympathizing county. The county produced 657 soldiers for the Confederacy, but only 187 for the Union, although 131 African-Americans joined the Union forces in 1864. In July 1862, Union forces at Caseyville, Kentucky threatened to arrest everyone in the town of treason, eventually freeing all but nineteen citizens. A skirmish in Morganfield on September 1, 1862, resulted in a Confederate victory.

The monument consists of a limestone base supporting a white marble obelisk. Inscribed on the monument were the names of sixty-four soldiers who had died in battle, and stated that "Union County mourns the loss of:". Due to its age, much of its text is now illegible.

Nathan Bedford Forrest led the first troops to enter the county during the War on a scouting expedition in November 1861. In 1864 there was much guerrilla activity in the area.

On July 17, 1997, the Confederate Monument of Morganfield was one of sixty-one different monuments related to the Civil War in Kentucky placed on the National Register of Historic Places, as part of the Civil War Monuments of Kentucky Multiple Property Submission.

== Gallery ==
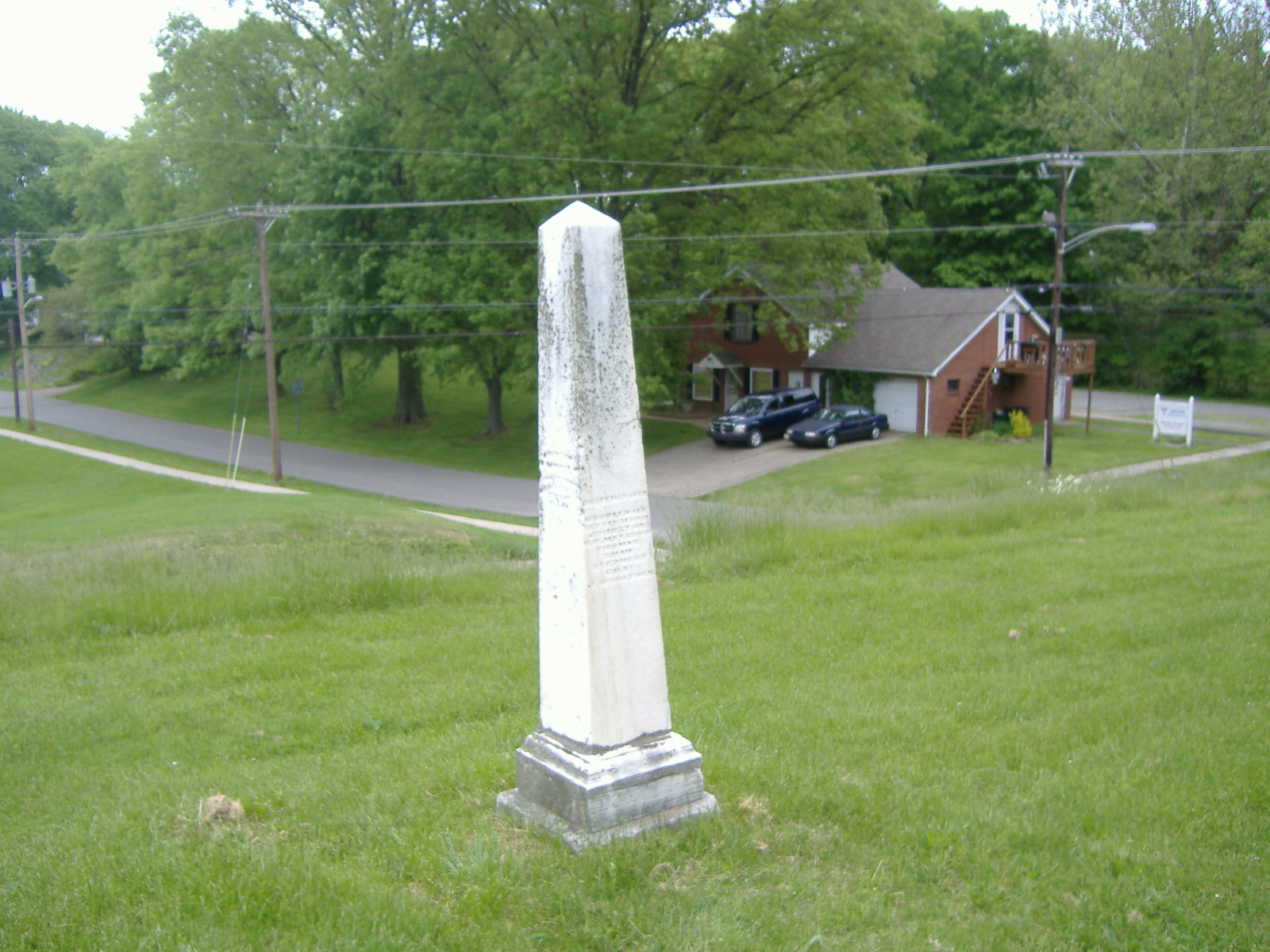
Monument
