= Confederate Monument in Owensboro, Ky. (former) =

- U.S. National Register of Historic Places
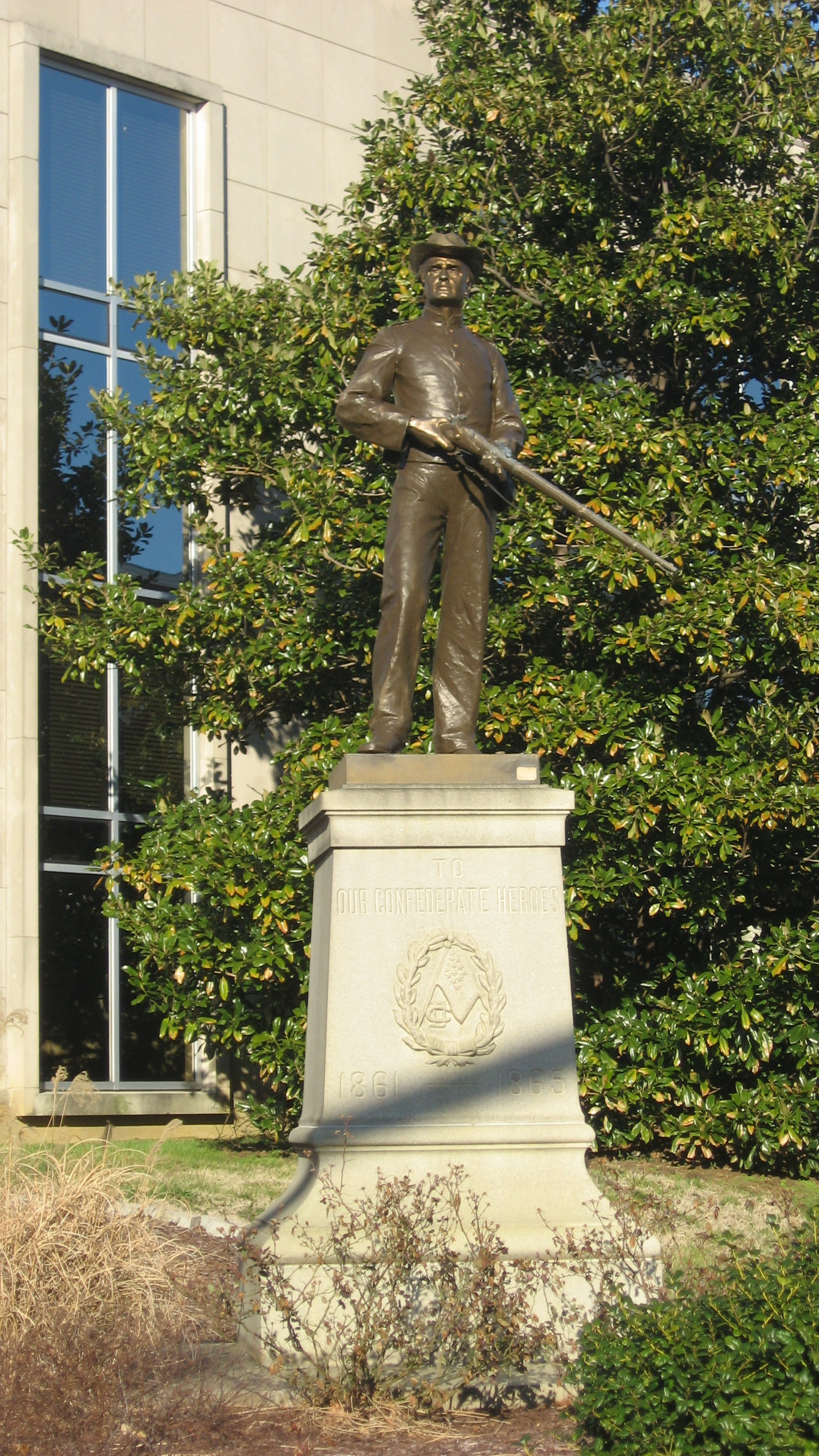
- The monument in 2013.

- Location within Kentucky Location within the United States
- Location: Formerly located on the Daviess County Courthouse lawn, 3rd and Frederica Streets (northeast), Owensboro, Kentucky. Pedestal relocated August 26, 2022. Sculpture relocated November 2022.
- Built: Dedicated September 21, 1900
- Architect: George Julian Zolnay (sculptor); John Williams Foundry, New York, N.Y. (bronze casting); Weony & Brown, Richmond, Va. (granite pedestal)
- MPS: Civil War Monuments of Kentucky MPS
- NRHP reference No.: 97000708
- Added to NRHP: July 17, 1997

The Confederate Monument in Owensboro, Ky., was a 16-foot-tall, two-part object – a 7-foot-tall bronze sculpture atop a 9-foot-tall granite pedestal – located at the southwest corner of the Daviess County Courthouse lawn, at the intersection of Third and Frederica Streets, in Owensboro, Kentucky. Nearly 122 years after the monument was dedicated in September 1900, the monument was dismantled in 2022, beginning with the removal of the sculpture in May 2022; the sculpture was placed in storage, pending a decision on what to do with it.

The pedestal was removed in August 2022 and given to the Kentucky United Daughters of the Confederacy, who relocated the pedestal to a Civil War battle site in Daviess County that they own.

The sculpture was relocated to Owensboro's City Cemetery, a.k.a. Potter's Field, in November 2022, with ownership transferred to the Owensboro Museum of Science and History.

== Owensboro and the Confederacy ==
In the summer of 1861, one of Kentucky's first Confederate companies was raised at Owensboro. The war hurt the city, as it disrupted river traffic that the city relied upon, and Confederate forces occasionally raided the city, including burning down the courthouse. A historical marker near the monument tells of three residents of Daviess County who received the Confederate Medal of Honor; one at the Battle of Murfreesboro, and two at the Battle of Chickamauga.

== Monument plans, dedication and description ==
In 1891, the Daviess County Confederate Association began seeding its plans to raise a Confederate monument. Two years later, in April 1893, Daviess County Fiscal Court – the legislative body of the county government – passed a resolution giving the Association permission to place "a monument...in memory of the Confederate dead" on the southwest corner of the courthouse lawn. Under the terms of the resolution, such a monument could occupy a 10 by 10 feet (3.0 by 3.0 m) plot; and Union veterans, who did not have an active monument plan, were extended permission to raise a similar monument on the less-prominent southeast corner of the lawn.

After several years of fundraising by a number of local Confederate groups, including the Association and its women's auxiliary – the latter of which in 1899 became John Cabell Breckinridge Chapter 306 of the United Daughters of the Confederacy (U.D.C.) – the monument was placed on the courthouse lawn on September 21, 1900.

The monument consisted of two parts: a pedestal and a sculpture. The granite pedestal is nine feet (2.7 m) tall. On the front of the pedestal is the inscription

TO
OUR CONFEDERATE HEROES

above the bas-relief logo of the United Daughters of the Confederacy – a wreath encircling the first national flag of the Confederate States of America ("Stars and Bars") and a figure of the interlocking letters "U" "D" and "C" ("U" is part of the "D" letter). The Confederate national flag depicted is the 13-star version, adopted by the Confederacy on November 28, 1861, and in use until May 1, 1863. This flag – which added two stars to the 11-star version of the Confederate national flag that had been in use since July 2, 1861 – reflected the Confederacy's claim to having admitted Kentucky to the Confederacy. In fact, although Confederate sympathizers in Kentucky did establish a shadow Confederate government in late 1861, Kentucky's pro-Union state government never joined the Confederacy.

Below the emblem is inscribed

1861 — 1865

On the rear of the pedestal is the tribute inscription

ERECTED
BY THE BRECKINRIDGE CHAPTER
DAUGHTERS OF THE CONFEDERACY,
1900.

Atop the pedestal was a seven-foot-tall (2.1 m) bronze sculpture of a Confederate soldier on alert bearing a rifle and wearing a short jacket and slouch hat. The sculpture was created by the Romanian-American "sculptor of the Confederacy" George Julian Zolnay and was cast at the John Williams Foundry in New York.

The dedication ceremony included speeches and music. Unverified reports claimed that some 4,000 or more people attended the event. Among the dignitaries present was S. A. Cunningham, the editor of The Confederate Veteran, which was the official magazine of the United Confederate Veterans (UCV) and a number of other Confederate heritage organizations.

== National Register of Historic Places ==
On July 17, 1997, the Confederate Monument in Owensboro was one of sixty-one different monuments related to the Civil War in Kentucky placed on the National Register of Historic Places, as part of the Civil War Monuments of Kentucky Multiple Property Submission. The only other monument on the list in Daviess County is the Thompson and Powell Martyrs Monument.

== Removal ==
In 2012 and again in 2017, there were local grassroots efforts urging Daviess County Fiscal Court to remove the Confederate monument from the courthouse lawn.

Following another such effort in summer 2020, the Court voted unanimously by resolution on August 6, 2020, to remove the monument. The resolution stipulated that the Court establish a 5-member Confederate Monument Relocation Committee within six weeks of the vote, with this committee to recommend a relocation site(s) within six months of the vote and the monument to remain in place until the Court passes an ordinance approving a new location.

In November 2020, the Relocation Committee, chaired by local historian Aloma Dew, recommended that sculpture be relocated to one of two potential sites, the Owensboro Museum of Science and History or the Owensboro Museum of Fine Art, and that the pedestal be relocated to a Civil War battle site in Daviess County (Battle of Panther Creek) that is owned by the Kentucky Division of the United Daughters of the Confederacy.

The Owensboro Museum of Science and History is the only one of the two recommended museum sites to have expressed an interest in the sculpture. Although this museum is a private entity, the City of Owensboro owns the museum's building and contributes funding. In March 2021, the Owensboro Mayor and City Commission reiterated their previously stated position ruling out the Museum as a site for the monument.

=== Legal challenge ===
In April 2021, the Kentucky Division of the United Daughters of the Confederacy sued the members of Daviess County Fiscal Court in Daviess County District Court. Kentucky U.D.C. claimed ownership of the monument and requested – and were granted – a temporary restraining order preventing the monument from being moved until the ownership issue was resolved in court.

In late March 2022, with the case still unresolved, the Southern Poverty Law Center joined the Owensboro branch of the NAACP in placing a billboard on Owensboro's central thoroughfare, Frederica Street, with the message: "Show [heart symbol] for all. REMOVE Owensboro–Daviess County's Confederate Monument." The billboard was up for 30 days.

On April 29, 2022, Daviess Circuit Court Judge Lisa Payne Jones granted Daviess Fiscal Court's motion for a summary judgment. In her 16-page judgment, Jones ruled that the Confederate monument is owned by Fiscal Court, and she vacated the earlier temporary restraining order.

=== Dismantling and removal of the sculpture ===
Kentucky U.D.C. had 30 days from the date of the April 29 ruling to file an appeal. On May 25, the group filed notice of its intention to appeal but failed to appeal by May 29 and did not seek to use any other legal remedies at its disposal to prevent Daviess Fiscal Court from exercising its legal authority to move all or part of the monument off of the courthouse lawn.

On May 31, 2022, the sculpture was removed from its pedestal and placed in a County storage facility pending a decision on what to do with it. The pedestal remained in place, with Fiscal Court planning to eventually remove or repurpose it.

=== U.D.C. appeal ===
The next phase of the appeals process was the prehearing conference. The goal of the prehearing conference was for the parties, Kentucky U.D.C. and Daviess Fiscal Court, to try to reach a settlement and avoid further litigation.

Under the rules of the Kentucky Court of Appeals, Kentucky U.D.C. had until June 14, 2022, to file a prehearing statement detailing the scope of the appeal it intended to make in the event a settlement could not be reached.

=== Settlement between County and U.D.C. ===
In mid July 2022, Daviess Fiscal Court offered Kentucky U.D.C. the pedestal of the monument, with the stipulation that Kentucky U.D.C. had until the end of the month to accept or reject the offer.

At the regular Fiscal Court meeting of August 4, 2022, Judge–Executive Al Mattingly announced an agreement between the Court and Kentucky U.D.C. under which (1) ownership of the pedestal was to be transferred to U.D.C. and the pedestal relocated to U.D.C.'s Civil War battle site in Daviess County, with the stipulation that any subsequent relocation of the pedestal must be outside of Daviess County, and (2) U.D.C was to drop its lawsuit and appeal. The relocation was to take place by the end of the month, with Fiscal Court retaining ownership of the sculpture.

=== Relocations of the pedestal and sculpture ===
On August 26, 2022, the pedestal was moved off the Daviess County Courthouse lawn and given to Kentucky United Daughters of the Confederacy, who relocated the pedestal on the same day to the Battle of Panther Creek site, a Civil War site in Daviess County that Kentucky U.D.C. owns. The site is south of Owensboro on U.S. Highway 431 at Sharp Road, midway between Owensboro and Utica, Kentucky.

Responding to a request from Daviess Judge–Executive Al Mattingly, the Owensboro City Commission on September 6, 2022, passed a municipal order that would result in the transfer to the county of a small parcel of the city-owned cemetery known as Potter's Field. Under this plan, which Fiscal Court approved in its September 15, 2022, meeting, the county relocated the sculpture to Potter's Field and is responsible for the continued maintenance and upkeep of the 6-foot-square site (until November 15, 2022, the county was also responsible for the continued maintenance and upkeep of the sculpture as well), with the city continuing to own and maintain the rest of the cemetery. The sculpture was relocated on November 10, 2022.

=== Transfer of sculpture to local museum ===
At its November 15, 2022, meeting, Daviess Fiscal Court agreed to transfer ownership of the sculpture to the Owensboro Museum of Science and History. The sculpture remains at the city-owned Potter's Field on the small parcel owned by the county.

== Gallery ==
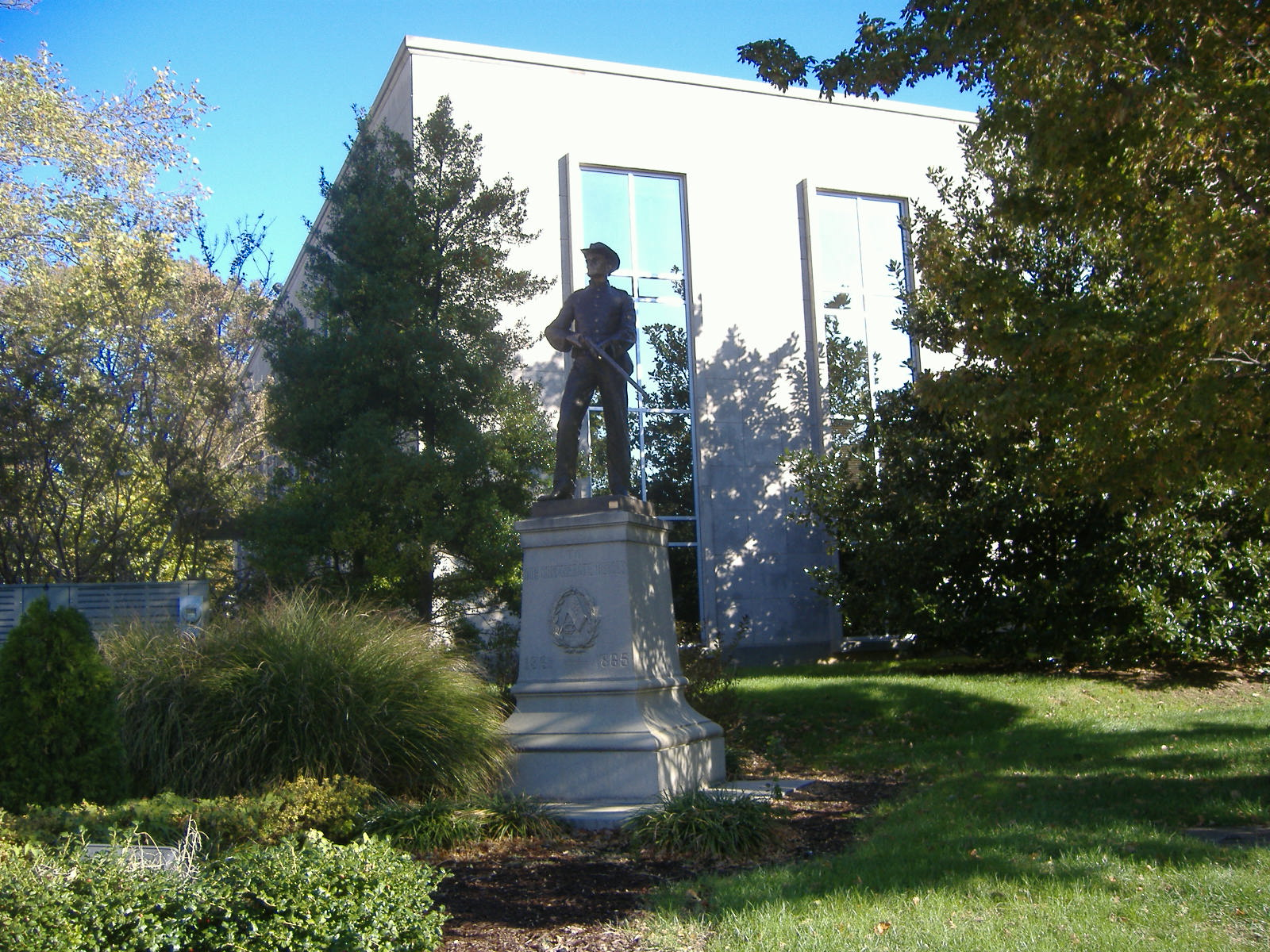
Front view of the Confederate monument in Owensboro, Ky.

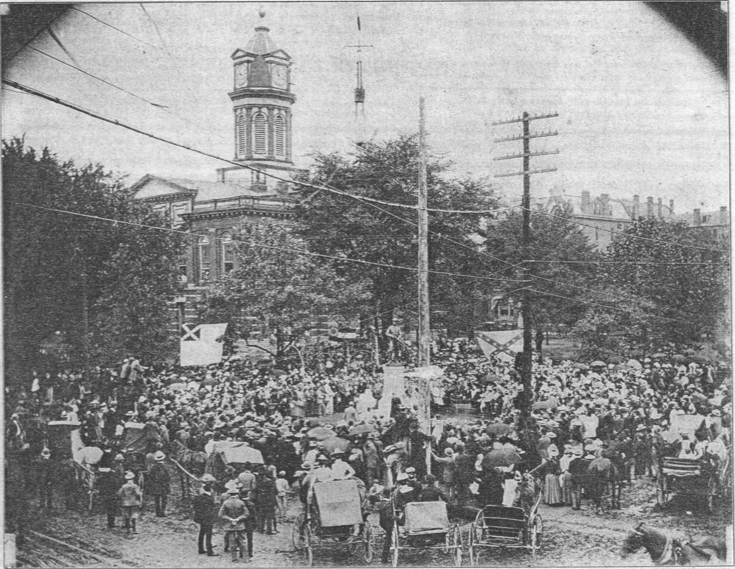
Photograph of the 21 September 1900 ceremony dedicating the Confederate monument in Owensboro, Ky.
