= Haphazard (Owensboro, Kentucky) =

Historic house in Kentucky, United States

- U.S. National Register of Historic Places
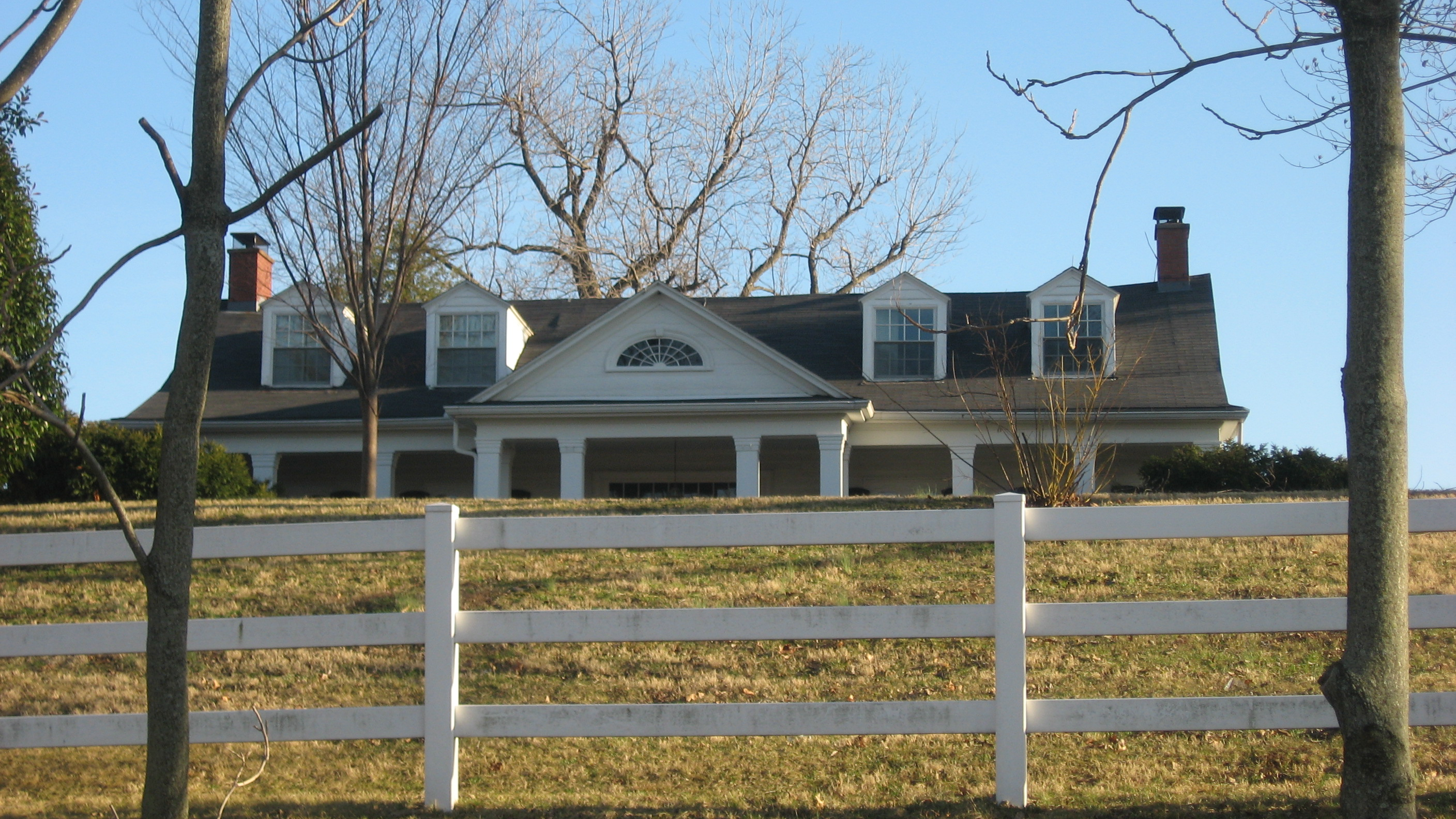

- Location within Kentucky Location within the United States
- Location: Pleasant Valley Rd., Owensboro, Kentucky
- Coordinates: 37°46′56″N 87°4′24″W
- Area: 5 acres (2.0 ha)
- Built: before 1822
- Architectural style: Greek Revival, Federal
- NRHP reference No.: 75000747
- Added to NRHP: August 22, 1975

Haphazard is a historic house located on Pleasant Valley Road in Owensboro, Kentucky. The house overlooks the Ohio River, and its name is probably derived from the river's eddies. The property which Haphazard was built on was originally owned by George Mason, a signatory to the U.S. Constitution, who was given the land in a grant surveyed in 1787. Mason's grandson Richard sold the property to Robert Triplett in 1822, by which point the log house forming the central portion of the home had been built. Triplett likely added the house's side wings, northern gable, and Federal style interior. Triplett accomplished many local firsts, as he was Owensboro's first large real estate dealer; Daviess County's first soil conservationist, barge operator, and author; the first distiller on the Ohio River in the county; and the builder of Kentucky's first railroad. In 1843, A. B. Barret purchased the house from Triplett; Barret then sold the house to William Bell the following year. Bell, the president of a local bank, likely added the house's Greek Revival portico.

The house was added to the National Register of Historic Places on August 22, 1975.
