= Confederate Soldiers Martyrs Monument in Eminence =

- U.S. National Register of Historic Places
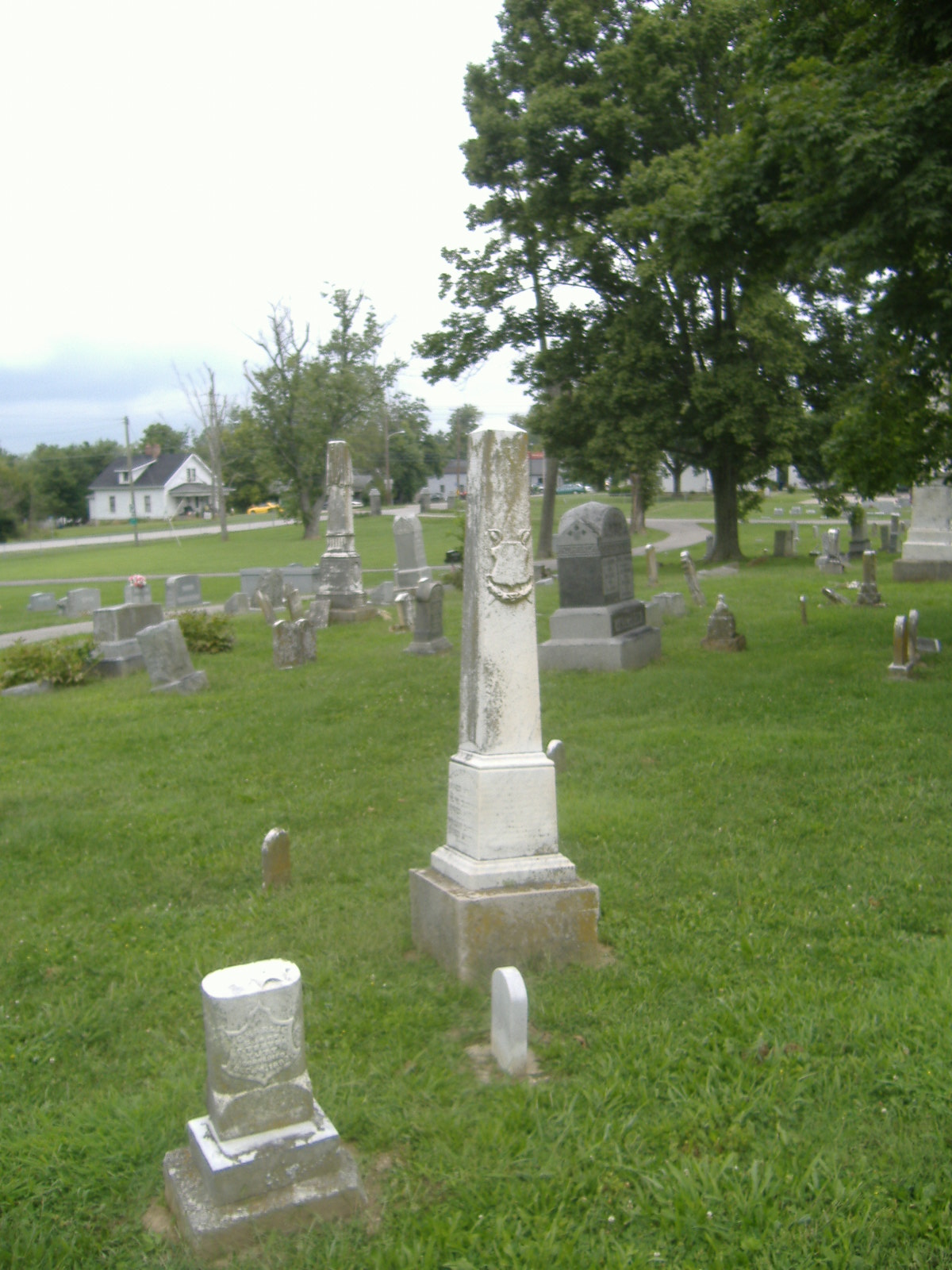

- Location within Kentucky Location within the United States
- Location: Eminence, Kentucky
- Built: 1870
- Architect: Pool & Co.
- MPS: Civil War Monuments of Kentucky MPS
- NRHP reference No.: 97000692
- Added to NRHP: July 17, 1997

The Confederate Soldiers Martyrs Monument in Eminence, Kentucky, notes the burial spot of three Confederate prisoners who were shot while imprisoned. The names of the victims were William Datbor (Darbro), William Tiche (Tighe), and R. W. Yates. It was done in retaliation for the killing of two unarmed African-Americans and authorized by Union General Burbridge's Order 59, which allowed for the execution of Confederate soldiers even if they were not directly involved in the earlier execution.

It was placed on the National Register of Historic Places on July 17, 1997, one of sixty Kentucky Civil War monuments placed on the Register on the same day.

== Description ==
The monument is a seven-foot-high white marble obelisk and rests on a marble base that is approximately two feet wide. The boundary forms a circle with a radius of ten feet.

== Inscriptions ==
There are inscriptions on two faces of the monument. They read:

Front:

WILLIAM TICHE / Aged 30 Yrs. / R. W. YATES / Aged 30 Yrs. / WILLIAM DATBOR / Aged 20 Yrs.

Pool & Co. N. A.

Back:

The three C. S. A. Soldiers who / were shot Nov. 3, 1864, in / Pleasureville by order of Gen. / Burbridge in pretense of / retaliation of two Negros that / were killed near Port Royal.

Sleep on ye braves for you have got / Our sympathy to our latest breath. / We would not have thee change thy lot / With him who caused thy death.

== Gallery ==
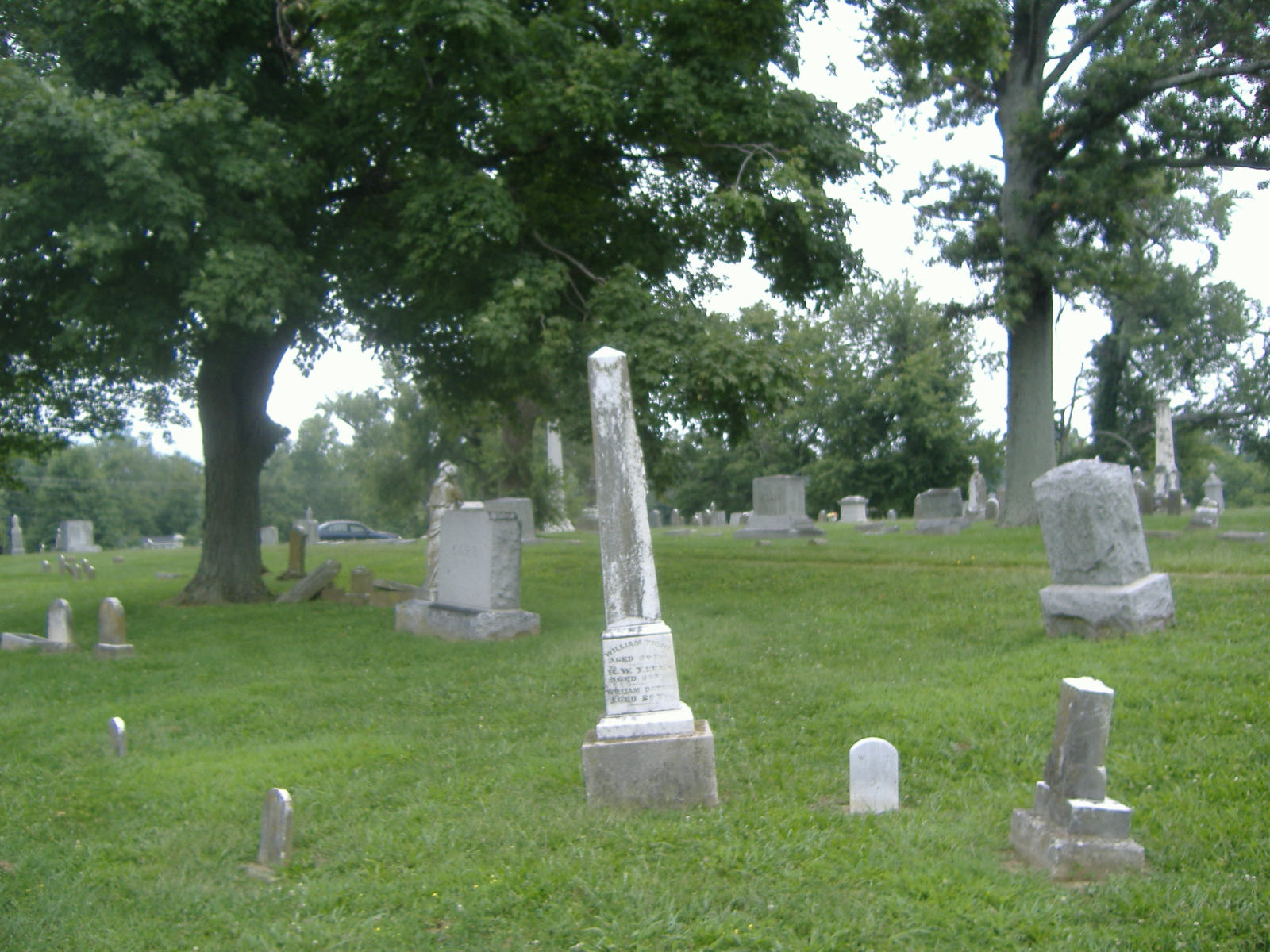
August 2009.

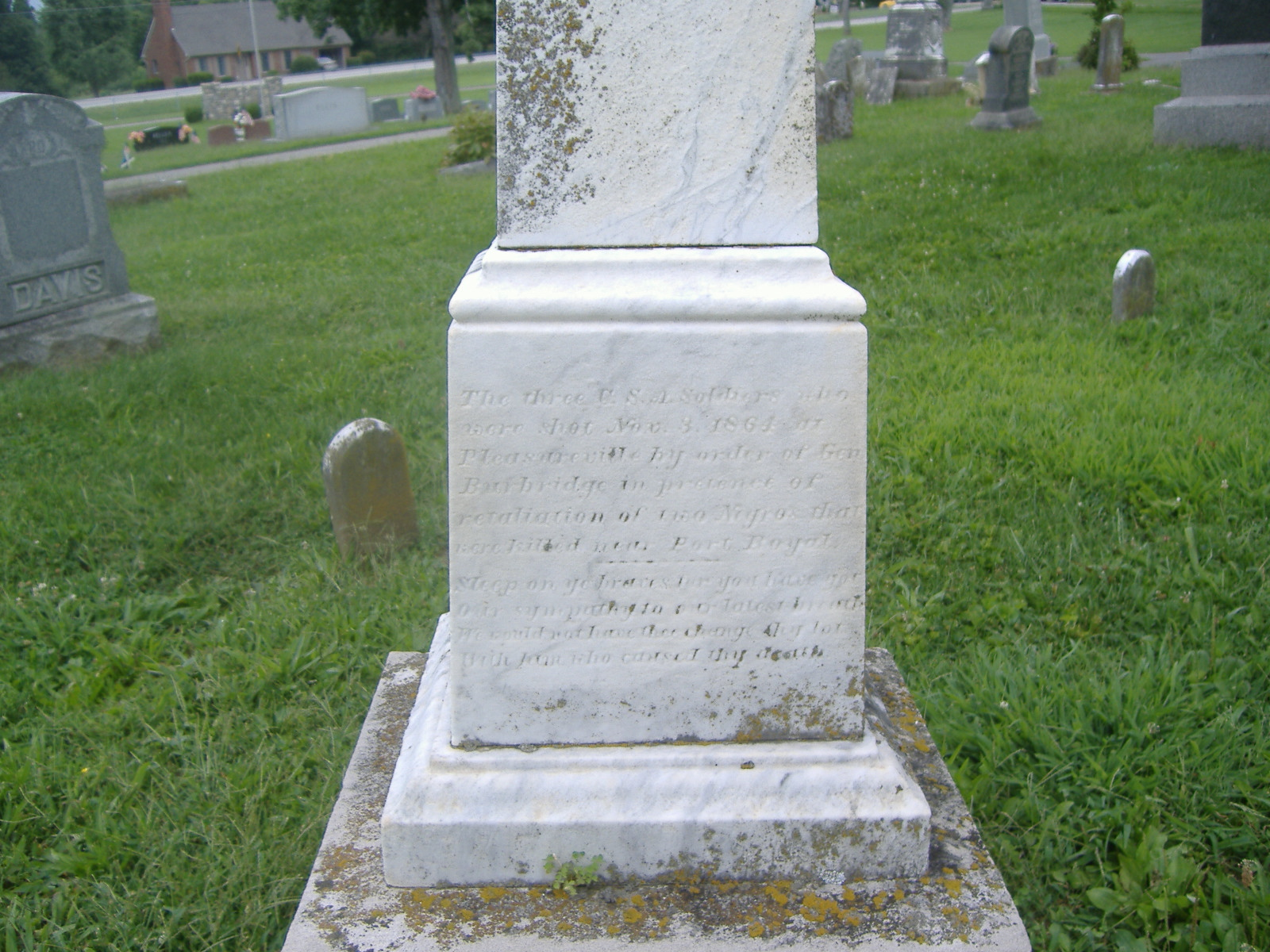
Closeup of inscription. August 2009.

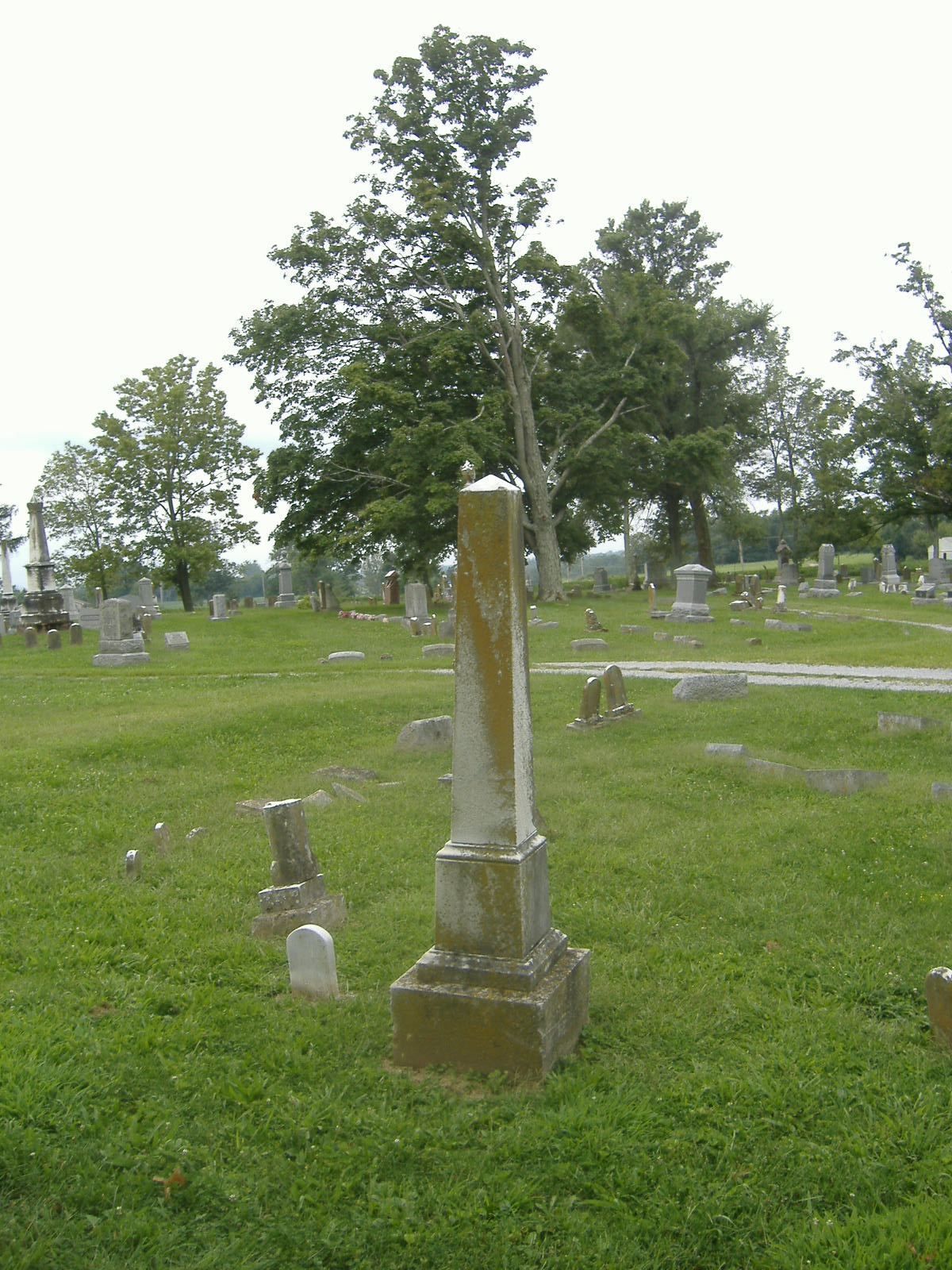
August 2009.

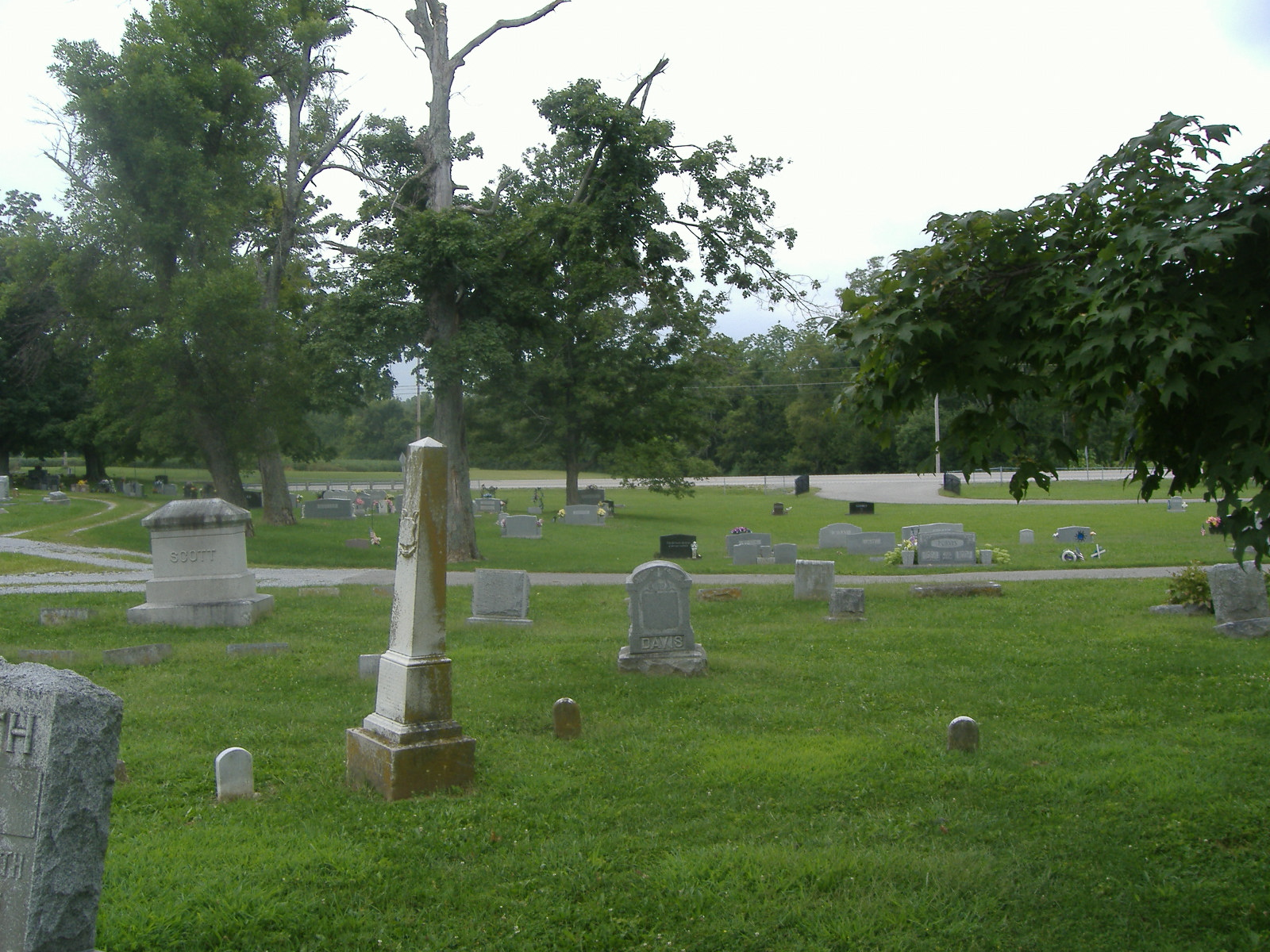
August 2009.
