= Saint Joseph, Kentucky =

Unincorporated community in Kentucky, United States

Saint Joseph
- Unincorporated community
- Location within the state of Kentucky Saint Joseph (the United States)
- Coordinates: 37°41′40″N 87°19′31″W
- Country: United States
- State: Kentucky
- County: Daviess

Area
  - Total: 0.37 sq mi (0.97 km^{2})
  - Land: 0.37 sq mi (0.95 km^{2})
  - Water: 0.012 sq mi (0.03 km^{2})
- Elevation: 433 ft (132 m)

Population (2020)
  - Total: 110
  - Density: 301.1/sq mi (116.27/km^{2})
- Time zone: UTC-6 (Central (CST))
  - Summer (DST): UTC-5 (CST)
- ZIP code: 42356
- Area codes: 270 and 364
- FIPS code: 21-67854
- GNIS feature ID: 502657

Saint Joseph is an unincorporated community located in Daviess County, Kentucky, United States. It is located around the intersection of Kentucky Route 56 and Kentucky Route 500.

== Demographics ==
Historical population
Census	Pop.	Note	%±
2020	110		—
U.S. Decennial Census
