= Lexington in the American Civil War =

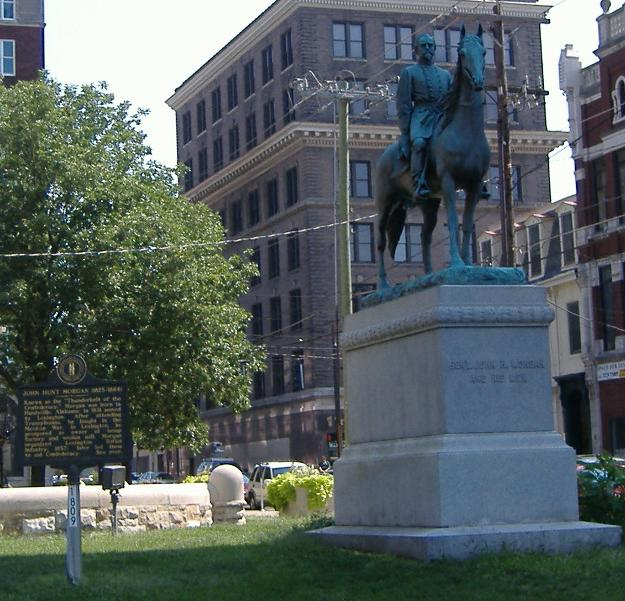
Former location of the John Hunt Morgan Memorial in downtown Lexington

Lexington, Kentucky was a city of importance during the American Civil War, with notable residents participating on both sides of the conflict. These included John C. Breckinridge, Confederate generals John Hunt Morgan and Basil W. Duke, and the Todd family, who mostly served the Confederacy although one, Mary Todd Lincoln, was the first lady of the United States, wife of President Abraham Lincoln.

== Prominent families ==
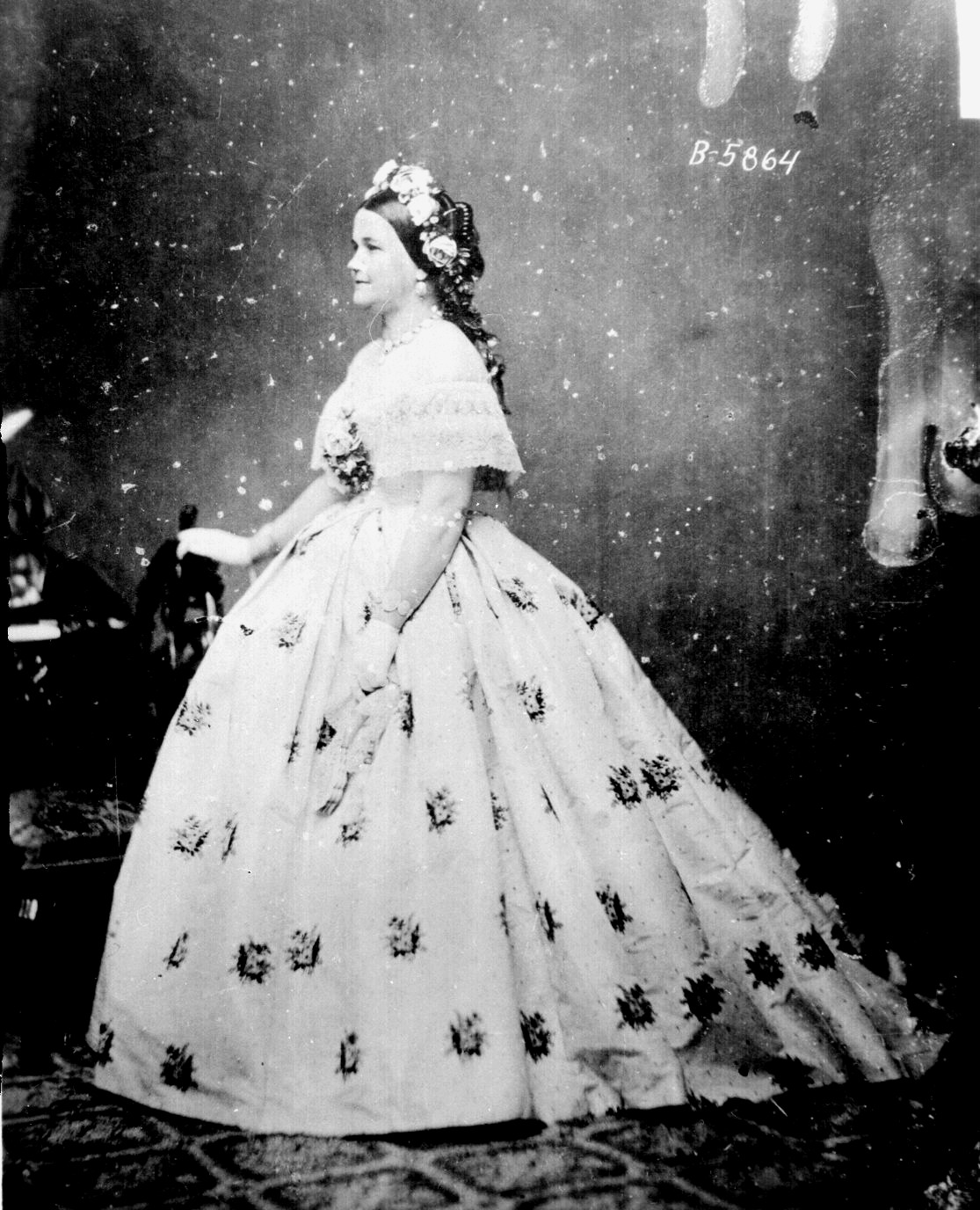
Mary Todd Lincoln

Among the well known of Lexington's families were the Todds. Abraham Lincoln's wife Mary Todd Lincoln was born there on December 13, 1818. She left in 1839 from the family home to live with her sister in Springfield, Illinois, where she would meet Abraham Lincoln in 1842. She went back to Lexington in 1847 to introduce her family to Lincoln on their way to Washington, D.C. for Lincoln's one term as Congressman. The Lincolns returned twice more to the city in 1849 and 1850, the latter to cope with the death of a son. The Todd family was split apart by the war. Mary's father Richard Smith Todd had fourteen children, of whom six chose the Union side, while eight others went for the Confederacy. Save for Levi Todd, the Todds that remained in Lexington during the war were pro-Confederate, and did not hide their preference.

Also affected were the Breckinridges and Clays. Robert J. Breckinridge was called "the strongest and sturdiest champion of the Union south of the Ohio". However his nephew John C. Breckinridge, Vice President of the United States under Lincoln's predecessor James Buchanan, two of his sons (Willie and Robert Jr.), and a son-in law joined the Confederacy. Of Henry Clay seven grandsons, three sided with the North, and four went for the South.

The Morgans, on the other hand, were in one mind and were sympathetic to the Confederacy.

== 1860 – 1862 ==
John Hunt Morgan

Lexington was preparing for the war even before Lincoln's election. When Kentucky governor Beriah Magoffin established pro-Southern Home Guards in March 1860, the Lexington Rifles were the first to join. When Lincoln was elected president, the United States flag stopped being displayed in the city. When news of the Battle of Fort Sumter reached Lexington, the leader of the Lexington Rifles, John Hunt Morgan, telegraphed Confederate President Jefferson Davis to offer assistance, and raised the Confederate flag above the city's woolen factory.

The first conflict in Lexington took place in August 1861. Union cavalry arrived in the city on August 21, numbering 200. Lexington Home Guard with Confederate sympathies quickly arrived on the scene. Former United States Vice President John C. Breckinridge, a resident of the city, negotiated between the Union cavalry and Confederate home guard, allowing the cavalry to safely depart the city. On September 19 a strong Union force returned the city, with orders to disarm the home guard. Then Captain John Hunt Morgan led Confederate sympathizers from the city, to rendezvous with other Confederates by the Green River. The Union force would make the city a stronghold, and established a prison and hospital in the town.

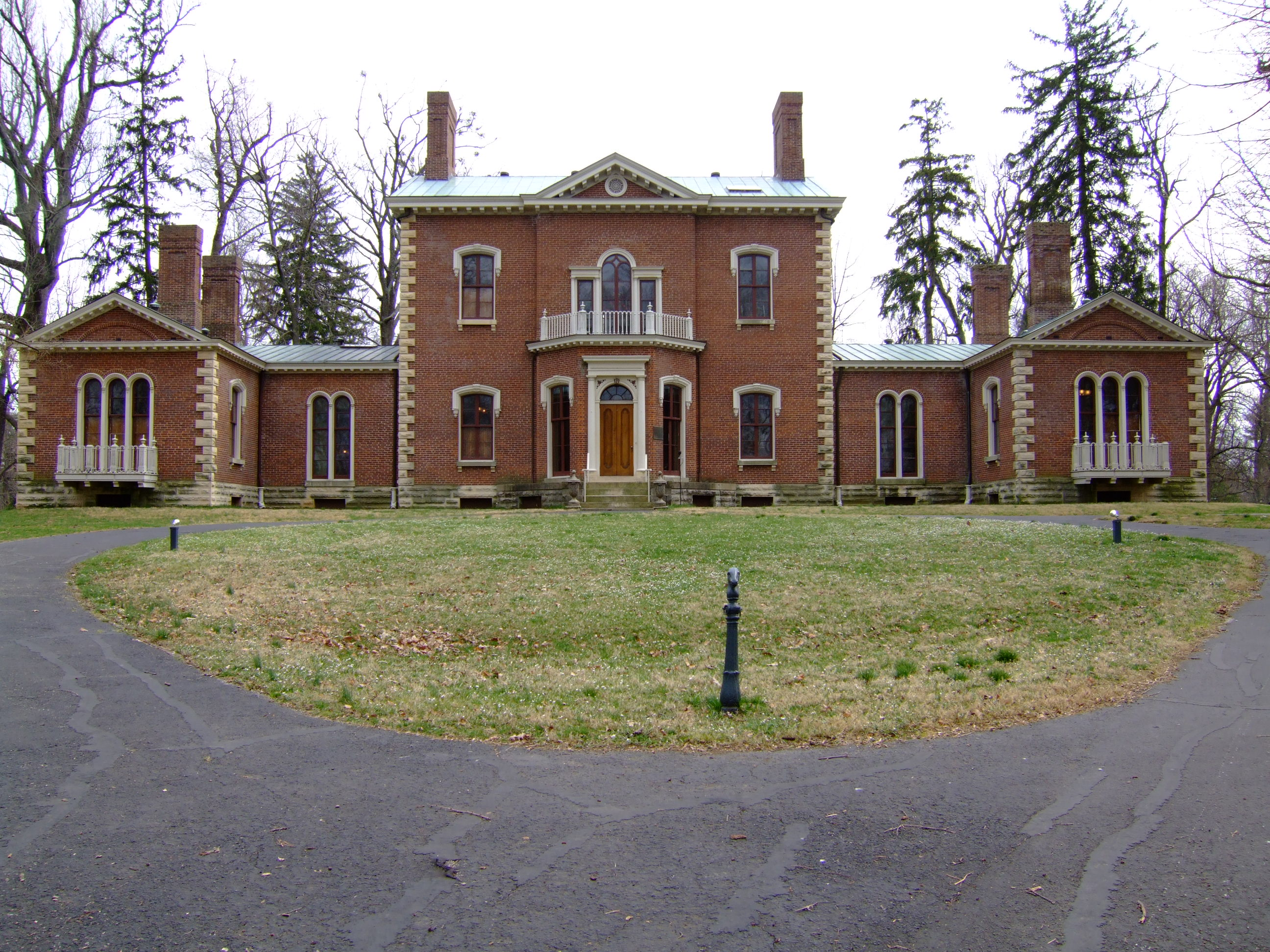
Ashland estate

The Confederates would return to the city following the Battle of Richmond. On September 2, 1862, Major General Edmund Kirby Smith led 11,000 Confederate soldiers into the city, discovering that Union forces had destroyed their (Union) government stores before retreating from the city. The residents of Lexington cheered the Confederates, prompting Smith to cable the Confederate government, saying, "They have proven to us that the heart of Kentucky is with the South in this struggle."

Following the Battle of Perryville, the Confederates left the city on October 8, with Union forces returning on October 16. However, on October 18 Morgan had returned to Lexington and captured Union Major Charles B. Seidel at Ashland, the former home of Henry Clay. Morgan reequipped his men, destroyed the military supplies of the city, and left. However, during the short firefight, the Confederates had managed to fire on other Confederates, causing John Hunt Morgan's brother Wash to be mortally wounded. Wash Morgan was taken to the Morgan family home of Hopemont to die.

== 1863 – 1865 ==
In the first three months of 1863, war refugees sympathetic to the Union arrived in the city. These mostly consisted of whites from eastern Tennessee, and escaped slaves.

Morgan made his last return to the city on June 8, 1864. Having lost his better soldiers in the previous year's Morgan's Raid, these men proceeded to loot the city. At least $13,000 in varied monies and $25,000 of horses were taken, with clothing stores looted as well. Morgan left for Cynthiana, Kentucky, where he was defeated, causing him to leave Kentucky for Virginia. Morgan was killed in Greenville, Tennessee the following September.

In February 1865 John C. Breckinridge was selected to be the Secretary of War. At the end of the war he left the country until given amnesty in 1868.

== Aftermath ==
In 1868 John Hunt Morgan was reinterred in Lexington Cemetery. Including his brother-in-law Basil W. Duke, they are two of seven Civil War generals buried in the cemetery.

There are four monuments to the Confederacy located in Lexington. Two were by the old courthouse: the John Hunt Morgan Memorial (1911) and the John C. Breckinridge Memorial (1887). These two monuments were removed in 2017 and are slated to be relocated in 2018. The other two are in Lexington Cemetery: the Confederate Soldier Monument in Lexington (1893) and the Ladies' Confederate Memorial (1874). There are no monuments to the Union in Lexington, unlike Louisville, where only one of the four monuments is for Confederates.

== See also ==
- Kentucky in the American Civil War
- Louisville in the American Civil War
