= List of public art in Lexington, Kentucky =

This is a list of public art in Lexington, Kentucky, in the United States. This list applies only to works of public art on permanent display in an outdoor public space. For example, this does not include artworks in museums. Public art may include sculptures, statues, monuments, memorials, murals, and mosaics.

Image	Title / subject	Location and coordinates	Date	Artist / designer	Type	Material	Dimensions	Designation	Owner / administrator	Wikidata	Notes
More images	Confederate Soldier Monument in Lexington	Lexington Cemetery 38°3′36″N 84°30′32″W	1893		Monument					Q5159729	
More images	John C. Breckinridge Memorial	Lexington Cemetery 38°2′53″N 84°29′56″W	1887		Statue	Bronze; Granite				Q6224301	Originally located on the Courthouse Lawn, relocated to Lexington Cemetery in 2018
More images	John Hunt Morgan Memorial	Lexington Cemetery 38°2′53″N 84°29′56″W	1911	Pompeo Coppini	Equestrian statue	Bronze; Granite				Q6240450	Originally located on the Courthouse Lawn, relocated to Lexington Cemetery in 2018
More images	Ladies' Confederate Memorial	Lexington Cemetery 38°3′34.04″N 84°30′31.93″W	1874	George W. Ranck	Memorial	Marble; Limestone				Q14690792	
