= Leslie Combs =

Leslie Combs may refer to:

- Leslie Combs (soldier and politician) (1793–1881), U.S. veteran of the War of 1812 and Kentucky politician
- Leslie Combs II (1901–1990), American equestrian
- Leslie Combs III (1852–1940), American diplomat
- Leslie A. Combs (born 1958), Kentucky politician
