= John Hunt Morgan Memorial =

- U.S. National Register of Historic Places
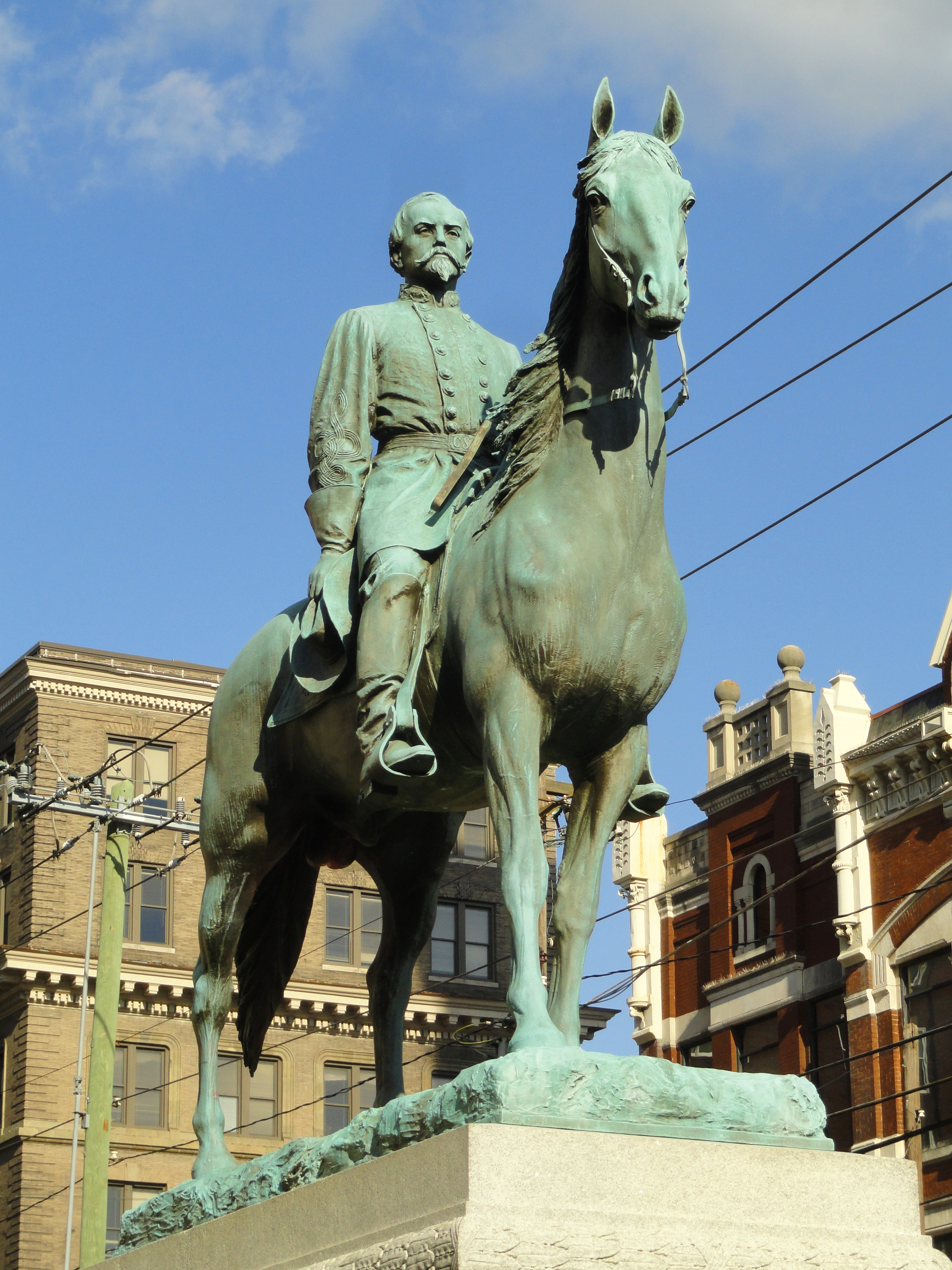
- The statue in the former location downtown.
- Location: Lexington, Kentucky
- Built: 1911
- Architect: Pompeo Coppini
- MPS: Civil War Monuments of Kentucky MPS
- NRHP reference No.: 97000704
- Added to NRHP: July 17, 1997

The John Hunt Morgan Memorial in Lexington, Kentucky, is a monument created during the Jim Crow era, as a tribute to Confederate General John Hunt Morgan, who was from Lexington and is buried in Lexington Cemetery. The monument was originally situated on the Courthouse Lawn at the junction of North Upper and East Main Street, but was moved to Lexington Cemetery in 2018.

With the help of the state government of Kentucky, the United Daughters of the Confederacy erected the monument on October 18, 1911, on what was then the courthouse lawn. The bronze statue was cast in Brooklyn, New York, at a cost of $15,000. The state of Kentucky contributed $7,500 of the cost because the UDC was unable to raise all of the funds promised. The ceremony included a parade of 400 veterans. The pedestal was of granite. The monument was dedicated by Morgan's brother-in-law Basil W. Duke, master of ceremonies, and keynote speaker Dr. Guy Carleton Lee, a third cousin of Robert E. Lee. Also in attendance were John Castleman, and Morgan's brothers Charlton and Dick. At the ceremony, the Rev. Edward O. Guerrant, who had served with General Morgan, gave the prayer of dedication, saying:

Great God, our Heavenly Father, we worship Thee, because Thou art God alone, the Ruler of all kings and the Judge of all men. We adore Thee as the God of our fathers, the Founder of our country, and the Savior of Thy people in all generations. We recognize Thy hand in every event of our lives, and thank Thee for this day and all it means to us.

Thy hand led Thine ancient people through the sea and the wilderness to the promised land. Thy hand has led us through the storm of battle and the baptism of blood until this auspicious day.

We thank Thee for Thy guidance to the blessings of a reunited country and the preservation of our liberties, and the burial of our animosities.

We humbly pray for Thy blessing upon the hands that built this monument, the love that inspired it, the principles that sanctified it, and the reunited people who honor it this day. May it stand for generations to teach the love of country to our children, devotion to country to all people, the heroism of men who contended for right, as God gave them to see the right.

We pray Thy richest blessings on our reunited country, the asylum of all nations, the glory of the past and the hope of the future. May we prove ourselves worthy of such a country, such a Government and such a God, we humbly ask in the name of Thy blessed Son, our Savior.

Amen.

Of the monuments of the American Civil War in Kentucky, it is the only one with a soldier on horseback.

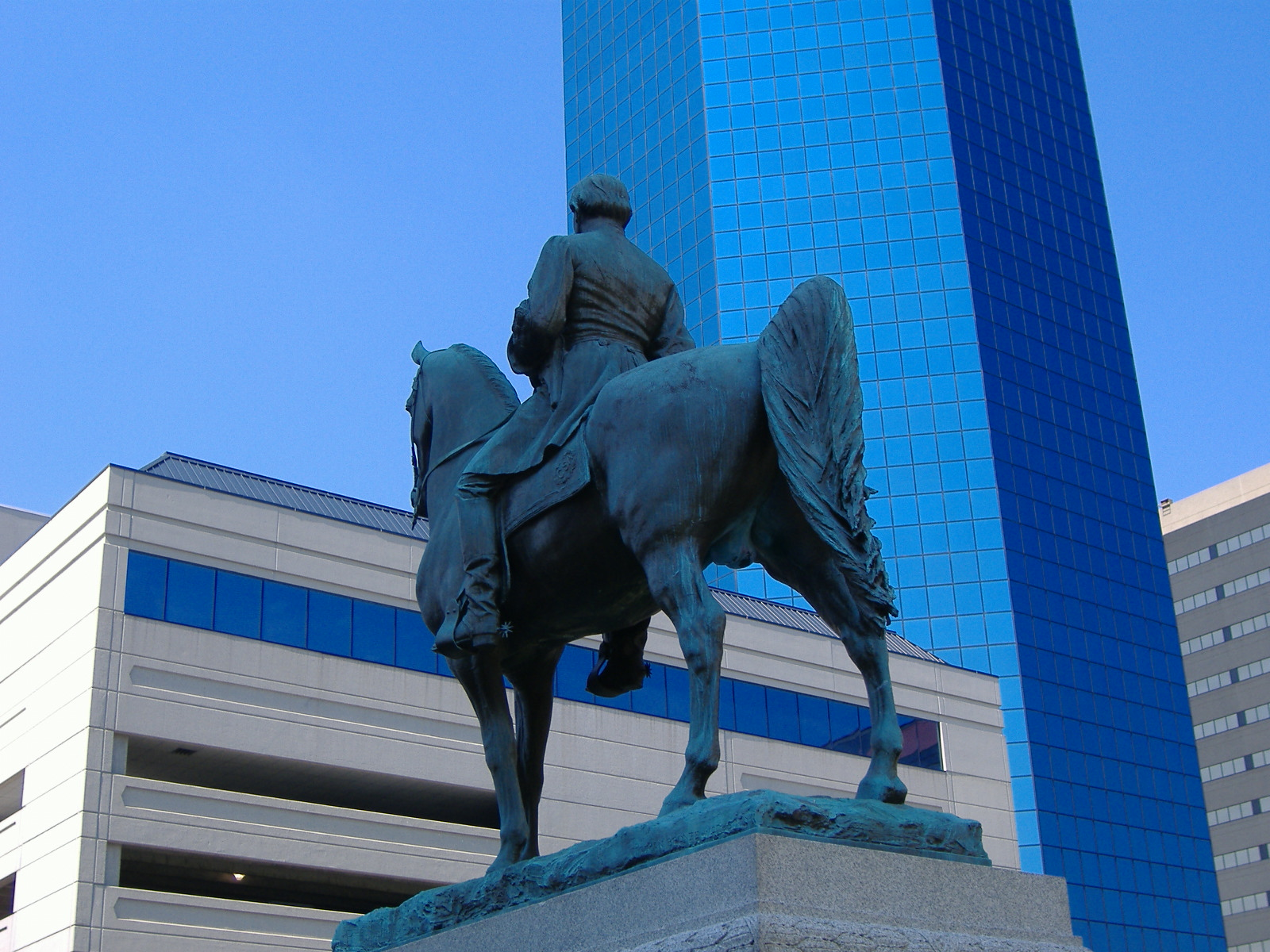
Rear view of statue showing the testicles on Morgan's filly

Morgan's horse, Black Bess, was a mare, but sculptor Pompeo Coppini thought a stallion was more appropriate. Coppini said, "No hero should bestride a mare!". Therefore, Coppini added the necessary testicles. Undergraduates from nearby University of Kentucky had been known to paint the testicles of the horse in the school colors of blue and white. An anonymous author wrote the "Ballad of Black Bess", which ended with:

So darkness comes to Bluegrass men —
Like darkness o'er them falls —
For well we know gentlemen should show
Respect for a lady's balls.

The memorial was one of 60 different Civil War properties in Kentucky placed on the National Register of Historic Places on the same day, July 17, 1997. Three other properties listed that day are also located in Lexington: the John C. Breckinridge Memorial, which was formerly on the other side of the same block as the Morgan Memorial, the Confederate Soldier Monument in Lexington, and the Ladies' Confederate Memorial. All four properties are located in Lexington Cemetery.

== Removal from original site ==
In November 2015, a committee, the Urban County Arts Review Board, voted to recommend removal of the Morgan and Breckinridge memorials. After receiving pressure from local grassroots organizing, Mayor Jim Gray re-announced plans to relocate the memorial to Veterans Park in south Lexington. The monuments were removed October 17, 2017. By July 2018, both the Morgan and Breckinridge memorials, without their original pedestals, had been relocated to Lexington Cemetery, where both men are buried.

== See also ==
- Hunt-Morgan House
- Lexington in the American Civil War
