= Frances Estill Beauchamp =

American suffragist, temperance leader, philanthropist (1857–1923)

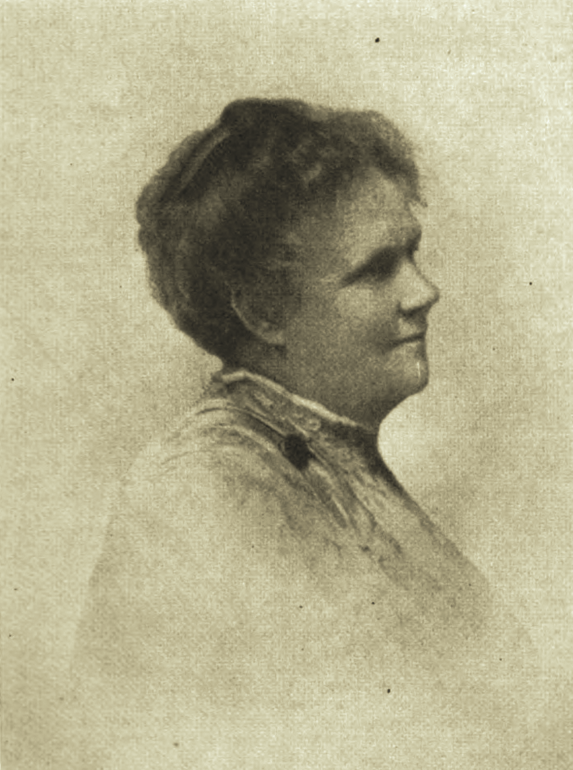
- Born: Frances Estill; June 27, 1860; Madison County, Kentucky, U.S.
- Died: April 11, 1923 (aged 62); Geneva, New York, U.S.
- Resting place: Lexington Cemetery, Lexington, Kentucky
- Other name: "Fannie"
- Occupations: activist; social reformer; lecturer
- Political party: Prohibition Party
- Movement: temperance; women's suffrage
- Spouse: James H. Beauchamp (m. 1875; died 1906)

Signature
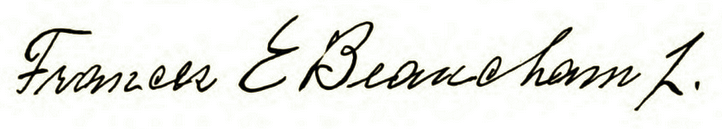

Frances Estill Beauchamp (née, Estill; June 27, 1860 – April 11, 1923) was an American temperance activist, social reformer, and lecturer. In 1886, Beauchamp took active responsibilities of leadership in the Woman's Christian Temperance Union (WCTU), being elected local president at Lexington, Kentucky and also state secretary. In 1896, she was elected state president of the WCTU. Beauchamp attended every national convention of the order since 1887. In 1894, she was elected one of the two national WCTU secretaries, and while state president, she was a vice president of the National Union. She served as Kentucky state chair of the Prohibition Party, becoming secretary of the National committee in 1911.

== Early life and education ==
Frances (nickname, "Fannie") Estill was born in Madison County, Kentucky, June 27, 1860, in the home of her paternal ancestor, General Samuel Estill, and was of the fifth generation born on the old farm which was taken up from the Commonwealth of Virginia by his progenitors. She was of Quaker ancestry. Her parents were James W. and Nancy (Scott) Estill. The father was engaged in stock raising on a large scale in the old Paint Lick community of Garrard County. In 1880, he moved to Lexington, and for several years, was associated in business with his son-in-law, J. H. Beauchamp, on Versailles Pike near Lexington.

Frances' great-great-grandfather, James Estill, was a Virginia soldier of the Revolution, and for his service, was given a grant of land which he exercised in the Blue Grass region of Kentucky. Frances' grandfather, Samuel, spent his life on the plantation near Kirksville, Kentucky, on Silver Creek. He married Rebecca Hamilton, whose parents also had a land grant in Kentucky due to her father's Revolutionary service.

She was an only child, of a highly imaginative temperament and spent her childhood in dreamland. Her parents were intensely practical and insisted on regular habits and a systematic performance of the tasks assigned. She was devoted to her church and a local philanthropist from her youth.

She attended a private school in Richmond, Kentucky, until her ninth year and established herself at the head of her classes, being prominently expert in mathematics. She was devoted to her teacher, the Reverend R. L. Breck, and was deeply grieved when her parents removed her from this school to Science Hill, Shelbyville, Kentucky. Her education covered the English branches, music and French. She was graduated from this institution at age 16 and plans were made to have her studies finished abroad.

== Career ==
In 1875, (Note: According to Cherrington (1925), the couple married in 1877.) instead of studying abroad, she married James H. Beauchamp (1844–1906), a rising young lawyer and Christian gentleman, who shared her ambitions and encouraged her work. Mr. Beauchamp was a native of Spencer County, Kentucky, and was reared in Union County in the western part of the state. He was also of Virginia ancestry, and his father, Alfred Beauchamp, was of old French Huguenot stock, descended from one of three brothers who came to America from England. Mr. Beauchamp grew up in Union County, Kentucky was liberally educated and studied law with an uncle, who for forty years was county clerk of Spencer County. He practiced for a time in Spencer County, and then moved to Lexington, where he became associated with John R. Allen and for a number of years was a member of the firm Buckner, Beauchamp & Allen. Mr. and Mrs. Beauchamp had no children of their own, but took into their home and reared seven boys, including John Haley, Houston Brown, Frank Scott, Dr. Ernest Smith, and Rev. A. E. Smith.

Her interest in temperance reform was awakened in early womanhood. When the Lexington WCTU was organized in 1886, Beauchamp became its Corresponding Secretary. She was soon made President of the Lexington WCTU, then State State Corresponding Secretary and from that time on, held various offices in the State Union, proving herself to be a keen leader. In 1887, she was appointed superintendent of juvenile work for Kentucky. In 1895, after year of service in various offices, Beauehamp was elected president of the Kentucky WCTU. In 1894, she was appointed Assistant Recording Secretary of the National WCTU at the Cleveland Convention,

Beauchamp's ability as a lecturer and organizer found early recognition, not only among her own sex, but among the Prohibition Party leaders also; and in 1909, she was made State chairman of the Prohibition Party, becoming secretary of the National committee in 1911.

She was deeply interested in the success of the suffrage movement. She was for many years a member of the Woman's Suffrage Association.

The Kentucky WCTU established a settlement and school at Hindman, Kentucky, and Beauchamp was an official member of the board of that school from the beginning. This school was pronounced by the United States commissioner of education as a model school, and in many ways it extended its influence to raise and improve the standards of school work throughout Eastern Kentucky.

For a number of years, Beauchamp made a study of problems of prison reform, especially as affecting the handling of juvenile cases. The Kentucky House of Reform at Glendale, Kentucky was the direct outgrowth of influences set in motion by her and associates. Formerly, it was a practice of the penitentiary authorities to mix the boy inmates indiscriminately with the other convicts.

== Personal life ==
In religion, she was Presbyterian.

Frances Beauchamp died at the home of Mrs. Richard R. Wellington, at Geneva, New York, April 11, 1923. Burial was at Lexington Cemetery, Lexington, Kentucky.
