= Gratz Park Historic District =

Historic district in Lexington, Kentucky

- U.S. National Register of Historic Places
- U.S. Historic district
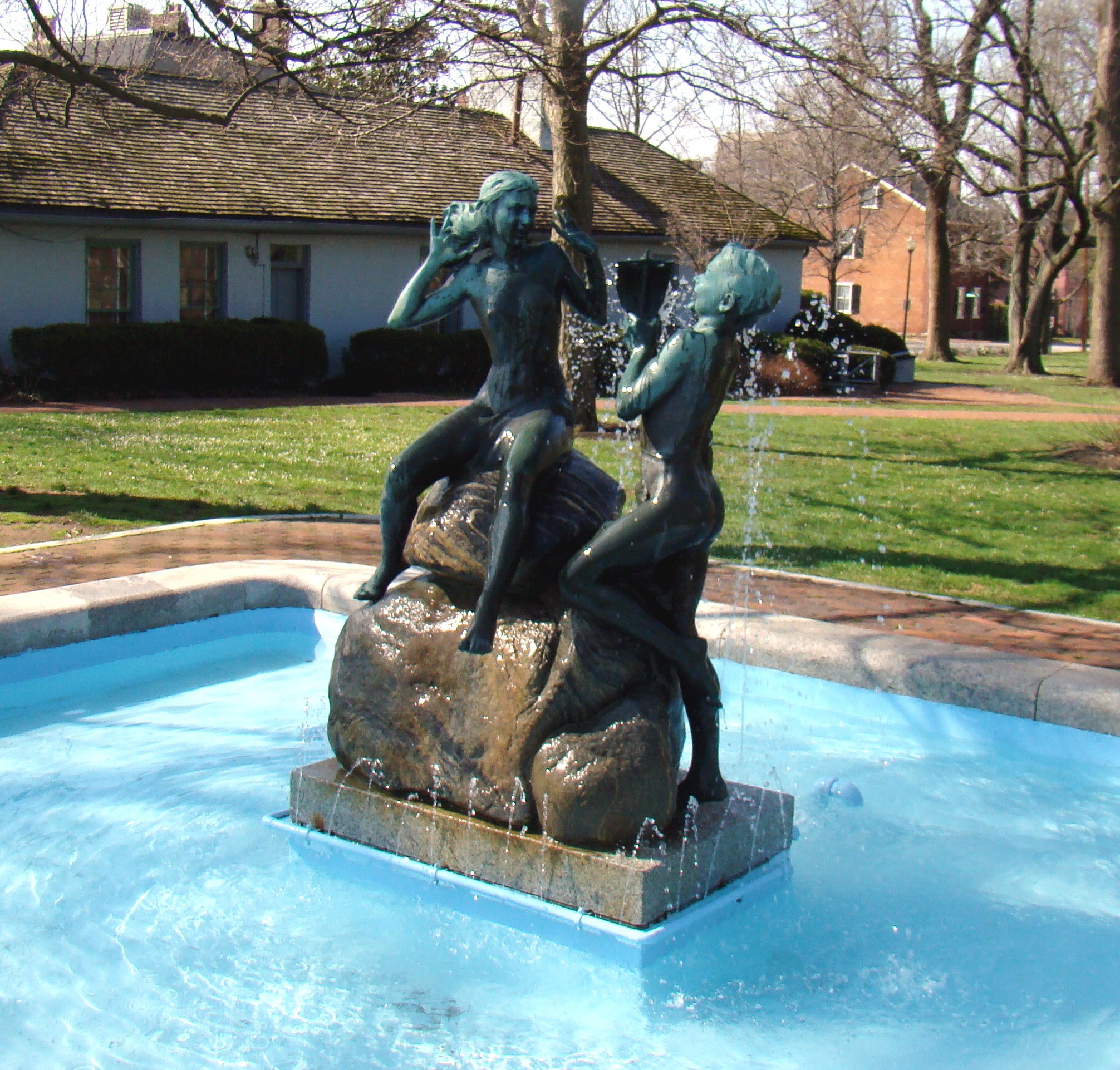
- Fountain of Youth

- Location within Kentucky Location within the United States
- Location: Lexington, Kentucky
- Coordinates: 38°03′00″N 84°29′46″W
- Architect: Multiple
- Architectural style: Greek Revival, Gothic
- NRHP reference No.: 73000796
- Added to NRHP: March 14, 1973

Gratz Park is a neighborhood and historic district located just north of downtown Lexington, Kentucky. It was named after early Lexington businessman Benjamin Gratz whose home stands on the corner of Mill and New streets at the edge of Gratz Park. The Gratz Park Historic District consists of 16 contributing buildings including the Hunt-Morgan House, the Bodley-Bullock House, the original Carnegie Library, which now houses the Carnegie Center for Literacy and Learning, and several other private residences. Gratz Park occupies a tract of land that was established in 1781 outside the original boundaries of Lexington.

== History ==
The Park was the original site of Transylvania College until the building was destroyed by fire in 1829. The Transylvania campus was moved across Third Street to its present location.

At the northern edge of the park is the "Fountain of Youth," built in memory of Lexington author James Lane Allen using proceeds willed to the city by Allen. The park was deeded to the city of Lexington during the mid-20th century and is still used as a public park today.

The Gratz Park is bounded by West Third and West Second streets on the north and south, and by the buildings that line Mill and Market streets on the west and east. The park is open to the public. The Historic Christ Church Cathedral is located at the edge of the district at 166 Market Street. Several houses within the district are open to the public.

The historic district includes 18 buildings in total.

One is the 1904 or 1905 or 1906-built Classical Revival-style Carnegie library, at the south end of the park, designed by architect Herman L. Rowe (see photo 5 accompanying the NRHP document). It has a tetrastyle portico (observed in photo). It was built in 1906 of Bedford limestone at cost of $75,000. It was eventually replaced as the Lexington Public Library by a new, large central library on East Main Street.

== Neighborhood statistics ==
- Population in 2000: 194
- Land area: 0.056 square miles (0.15 km^{2})
- Population density: 3,494 per square mile (1,293.3/km^{2})
- Median household income: $22,233
