= Bivouac of the Dead =

Poem honoring soldiers who died in the Mexican-American War

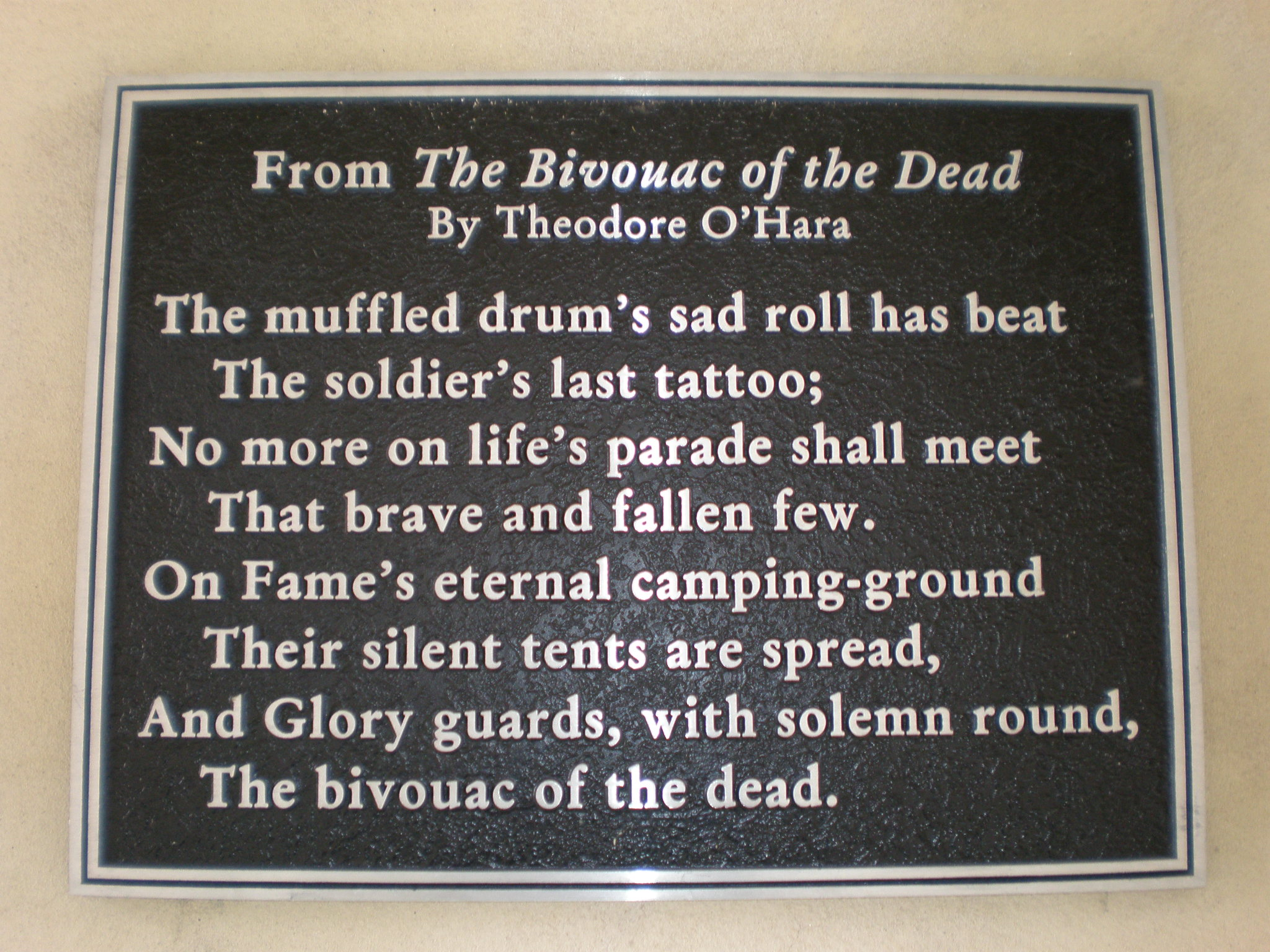
A plaque quoting the poem at Golden Gate National Cemetery

"Bivouac of the Dead" is a poem written by Theodore O'Hara, a native of Danville, Kentucky, to honor his fellow soldiers from Kentucky who died in the Mexican-American War. The poem's popularity increased after the Civil War, and its verses have been featured on many memorials to fallen Confederate soldiers in the Southern United States, as well as memorials in Arlington National Cemetery, including Arlington's gateway.

== Background ==
A plaque in Battleground National Cemetery quoting from the poem

When war against Mexico was declared in May 1846, O'Hara left Washington, D.C. to return to his native Kentucky in order to enlist. Within a month, he was appointed Captain of the Kentucky Volunteers, and served as their assistant quartermaster. Before he returned to Kentucky in 1847, he was made a brevet major. After hearing of the severe losses that the 2nd Kentucky Infantry and Kentucky cavalry suffered from the Battle of Buena Vista, O'Hara wrote "Bivouac of the Dead" in dedication of the fallen troops. When many of the fallen Kentuckians were buried in Frankfort Cemetery on July 20, 1847, future congressman and U.S. Vice President John C. Breckinridge spoke for an hour at the event. Whether or not O'Hara spoke "Bivouac of the Dead" is disputed, but it is commonly believed that he did. It is agreed he spoke the poem in 1850 at the same cemetery, for the interment of William T. Barry and General Charles Scott. "Bivouac of the Dead" would later be called "a worthy contribution to American Literature". It was first published in the Frankfort Yeoman in 1850. However, modern historians have also claimed it was not written until 1851, after Narciso López's failed attempt to remove Cuba from Spanish control.

O'Hara was known to change the lyrics to "Bivouac of the Dead". Alternations included removing mentions of specific places, and removing various stanzas. In 1858 the Mobile Register published what is believed to be the original version, with the Louisville Courier publishing the original with an introduction stating it was the version spoken at the 1847 ceremony, reflecting the changes in the poem. In 1900 The New York Times devoted an article decrying all the alterations to the poem, and stressed returning to the original version.

When O'Hara was reinterred at Frankfort Cemetery, a friend used "Bivouac of the Dead" as the eulogy.

== Poem usage after O'Hara ==
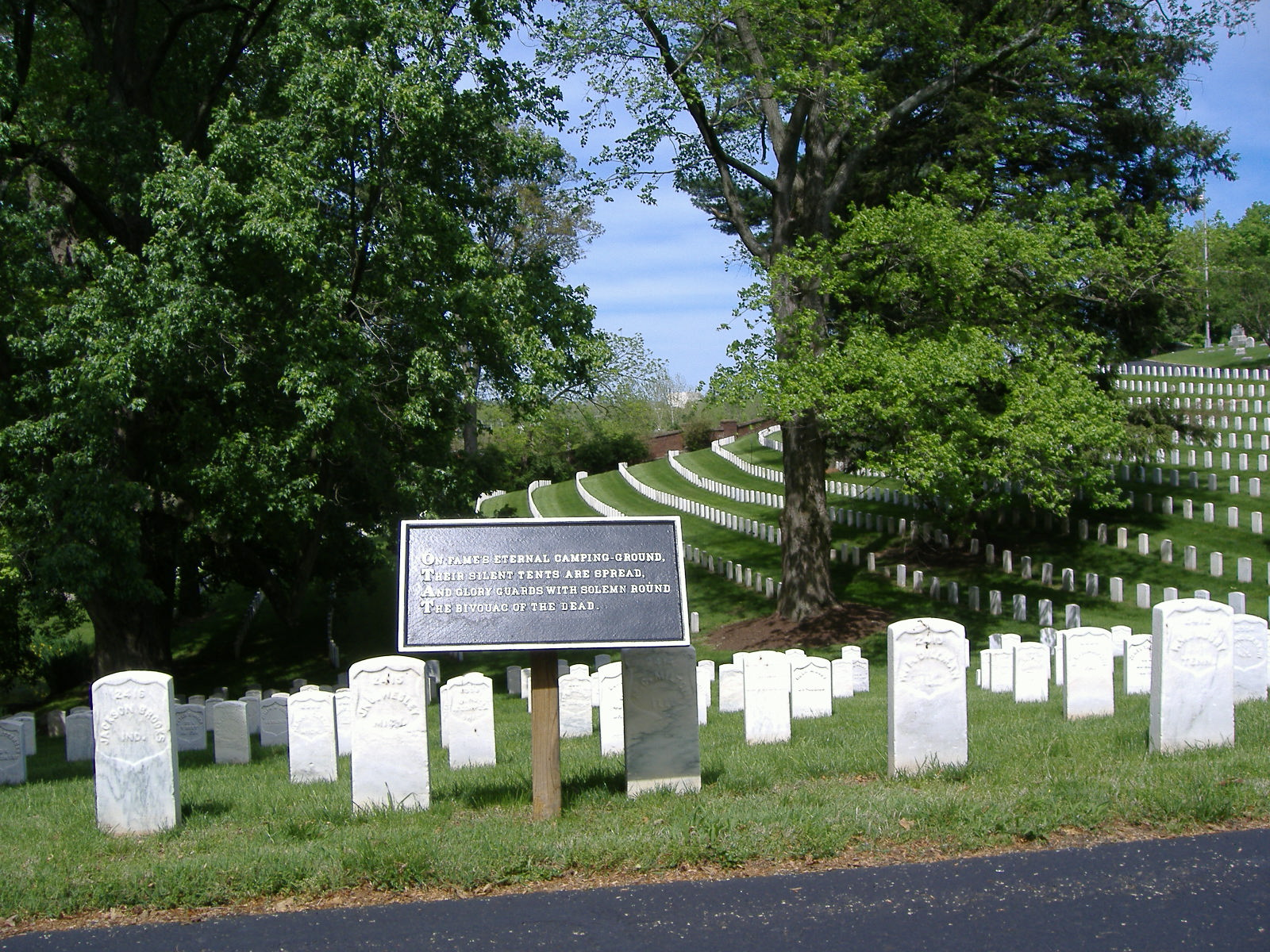
The poem quoted at Cave Hill Cemetery in Louisville, Kentucky

The first monument to the fallen Confederate States of America in Kentucky, the Confederate Monument in Cynthiana, used a verse from "Bivouac of the Dead". Six other monuments in Kentucky also used parts of the poem on memorials to fallen Confederates. Portions of the poem are also displayed on 7 plaques at Finn's Point National Cemetery in Pennsville, New Jersey, where a significant number of Confederate Soldiers who died in captivity during the American Civil War are buried.

It was Montgomery C. Meigs who chose to quote "Bivouac of the Dead" for the entrance into Arlington, due to its solemn appeal. However, at Arlington and many other national cemeteries, O'Hara was not credited due to having fought for the Confederacy.

Wisconsin Governor Lucius Fairchild, who lost an arm fighting for the Union at the Battle of Gettysburg, quoted the last stanza of the poem when dedicating the Grant County [Wisconsin] Soldier's Monument on July 4, 1867.

During the late 1920s and 1930s, instances of lines from the poem on markers throughout national cemeteries were removed, leaving only fourteen with "Bivouac of the Dead" verses on tablets. In 2001, the National Cemetery Administration began returning the first stanza to any national cemetery in which the poem is missing. Parts of the poem may be found at Marye's Heights in Fredericksburg, Virginia. Also, Antietam National Cemetery in Sharpsburg, Maryland, and Winchester National Cemetery in Winchester, Virginia, have phrases from the poem on markers at various points.

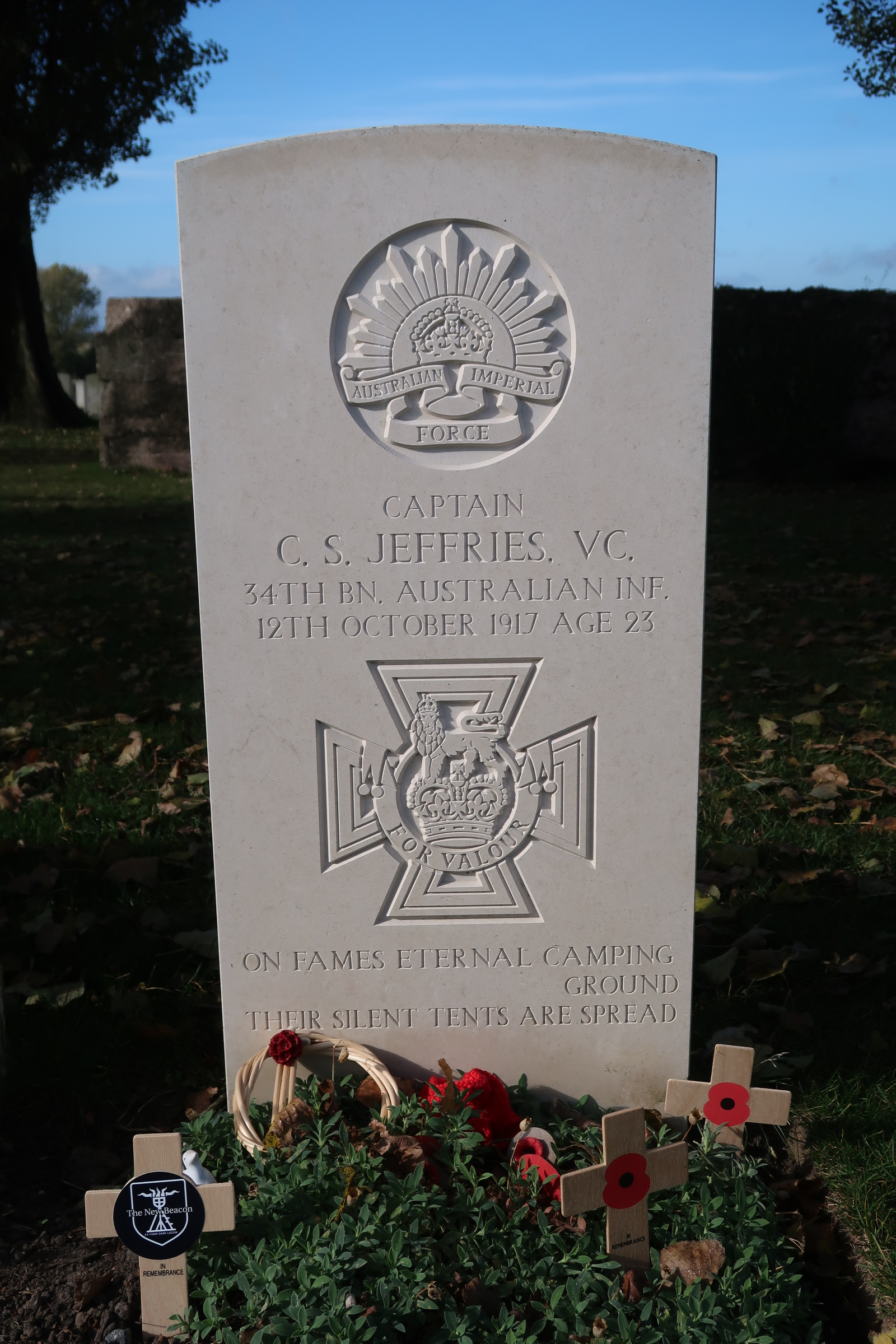
Clarence Smith Jeffries, VC (26 October 1894 – 12 October 1917) is buried in Tyne Cot Cemetery, Plot 40, Row E, Grave 1.

The poem is cited, without credit, further afield in Europe. For instance, Captain Clarence Jeffries was awarded the Victoria Cross, the highest decoration for gallantry "in the face of the enemy" that can be awarded to members of the British and Commonwealth armed forces. He is buried in Tyne Cot Cemetery, Plot 40, Row E, Grave 1, his gravestone quoting "On Fame's eternal camping-ground / Their silent tents are spread".
