= Confederate Monument in Cynthiana =

- U.S. National Register of Historic Places
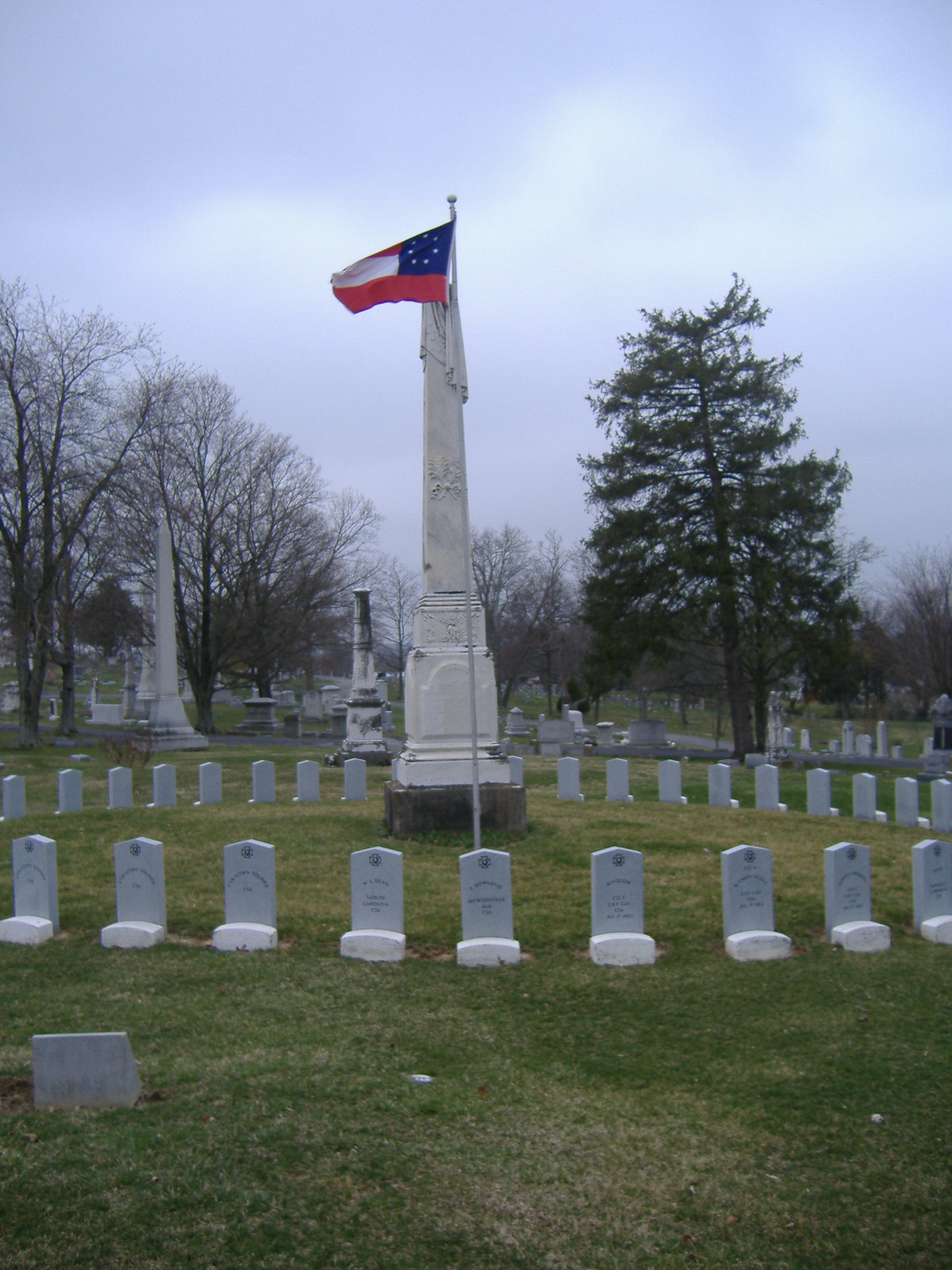

- Location within Kentucky Location within the United States
- Nearest city: Cynthiana, Kentucky
- Coordinates: 38°23′09.80″N 84°16′50.00″W
- Built: 1869
- MPS: Civil War Monuments of Kentucky MPS
- NRHP reference No.: 97000695
- Added to NRHP: July 17, 1997

The Confederate Monument in Cynthiana is located on the outer edge of Cynthiana, Kentucky in Battle Grove Cemetery. It was the first monument to the Confederate States of America dedicated in the State of Kentucky, and long believed to be the first Confederate memorial anywhere. Due to the 32nd Indiana Monument having been moved from its original location, the Cynthiana monument is the oldest Civil War monument still standing at its original location, where the second Battle of Cynthiana started, in the then-new town cemetery.

The Cynthiana Confederate Monument Association, a group of women, spearheaded the movement to build the monument, although the money required to build it came from men. It was built in 1869 by the Muldoon Monument Company of Louisville, Kentucky, at the cost of $2,200. The white marble obelisk stands 22 feet (6.7 m) high on a four square foot limestone base three feet high (25 feet high combined), with a Confederate flag draped atop it. The graves of 47 Confederate veterans who died during the Civil War, many of whom are unknown, and a substantial number of John Hunt Morgan's 2nd Kentucky Cavalry who twice raided the town of Cynthiana during the War, were transferred from another cemetery to encircle the monument. David M. Snyder died in 1896, and per his wishes to be buried with his companions, was placed as part of the circle. The Cynthiana monument set the tone of many of the first Bluegrass monuments in the Confederacy, being reminiscent of death, particularly grave markers. This is best represented by the Confederate Monument of Bowling Green, Confederate Monument at Crab Orchard, Confederate Monument in Georgetown, and the Confederate Monument in Versailles.

On the back of the monument is a verse from the Bivouac of the Dead, which six other monuments would also include a verse from.

The Cynthiana Democrat said the monument was not just for the local citizenry, but "for every man and every nation, whose children and whose people have shed blood in defense of their Homes, in defense of their country, in defense of Justice and Truth".

The dedication ceremony for the monument, held on May 27, 1869, involved a parade, speeches, and food. Colonel W. C. P. Breckinridge gave the dedication speech, highlighting the virtue of the Confederate cause and the bravery of its soldiers. Soon thereafter, his cousin's wife, Mary Cyrene Burch Breckinridge, founded the Ladies Memorial and Monument Association of Lexington. This group raised the funds to create and install the Ladies' Confederate Memorial in the Lexington Cemetery.

On July 17, 1997, the Cynthiana monument was one of sixty-two monuments included in the Civil War Monuments of Kentucky MPS.

== Gallery ==
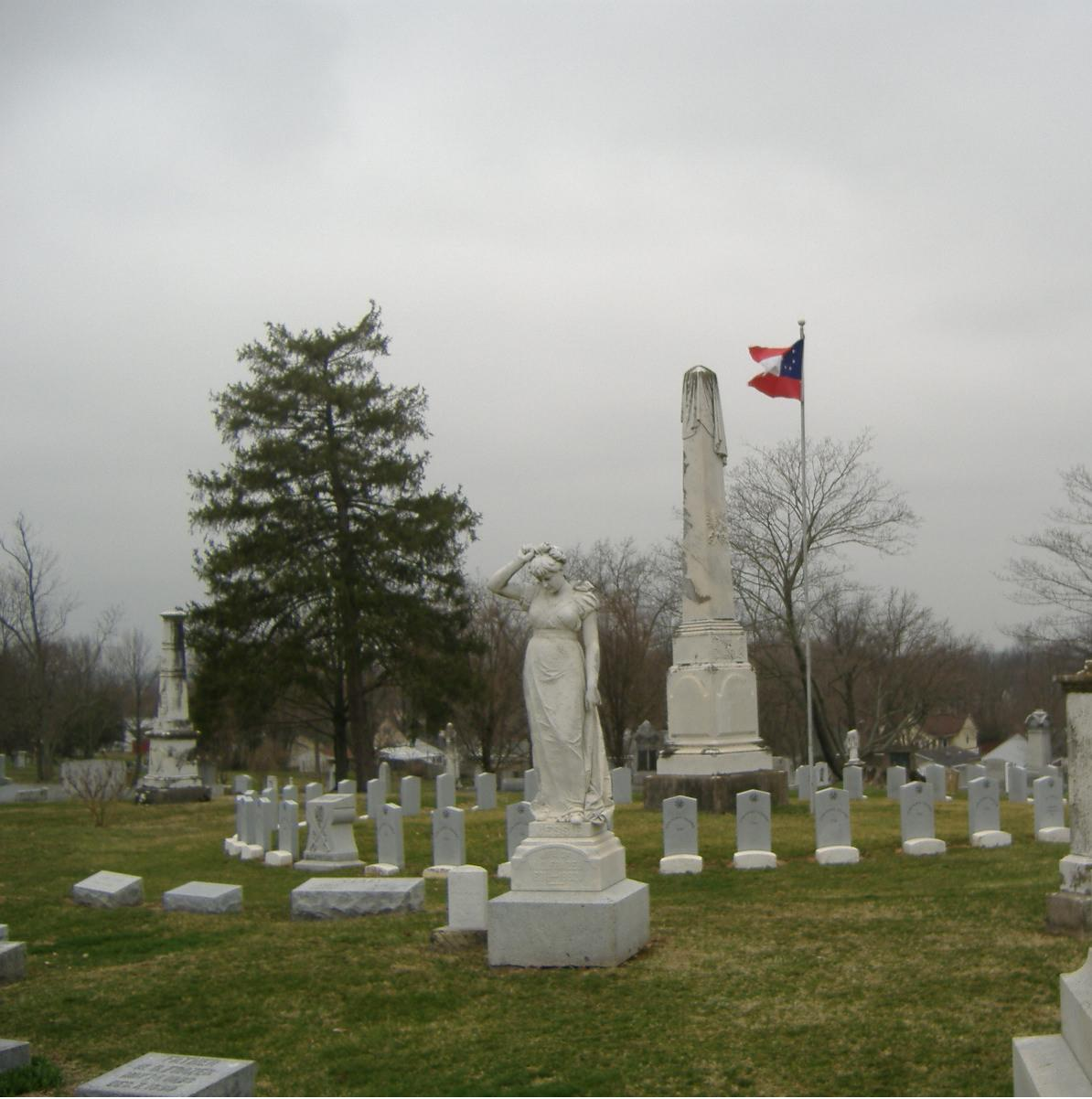
Front view

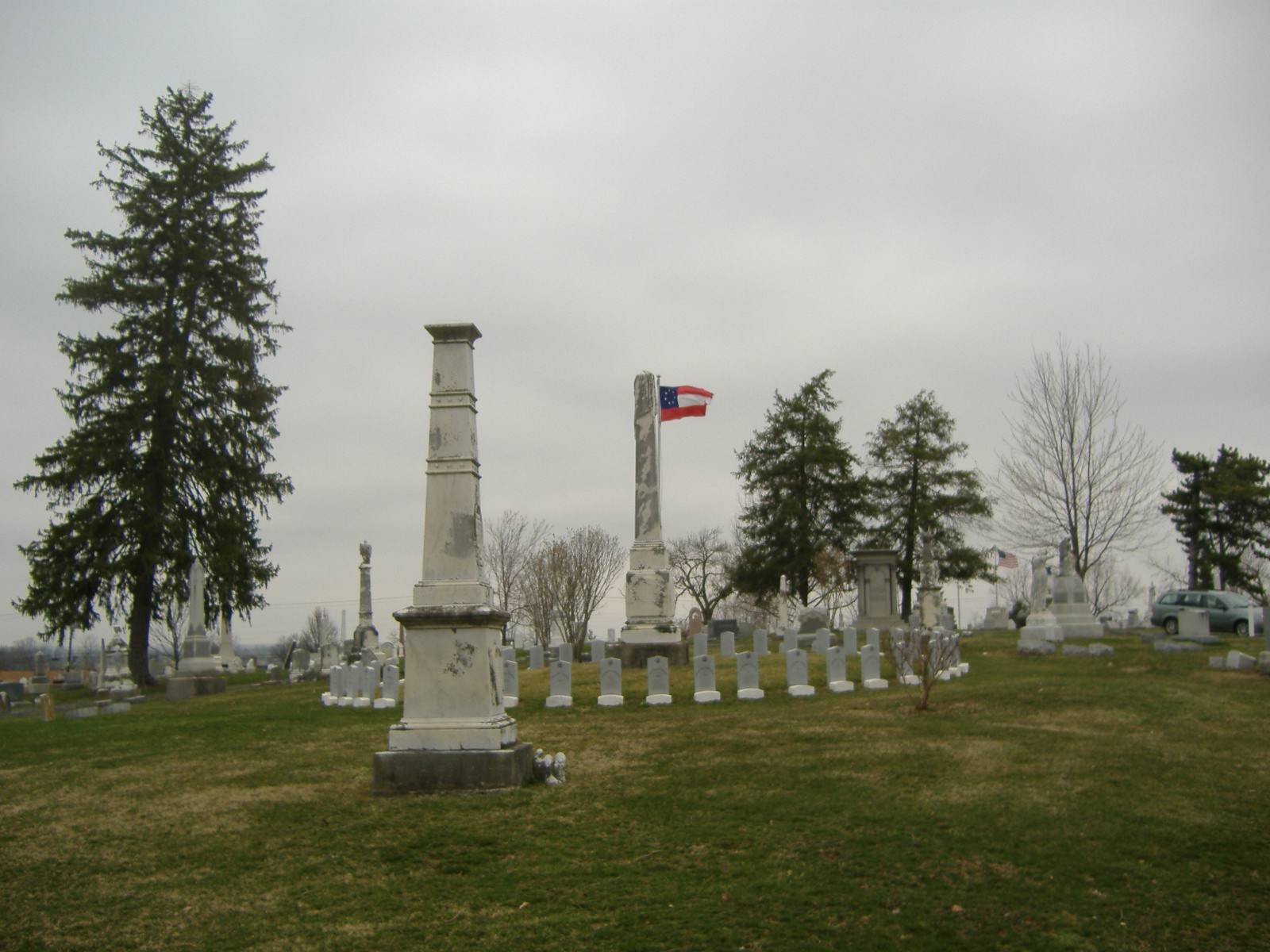
Rear view
