= Confederate Monument at Crab Orchard =

- U.S. National Register of Historic Places
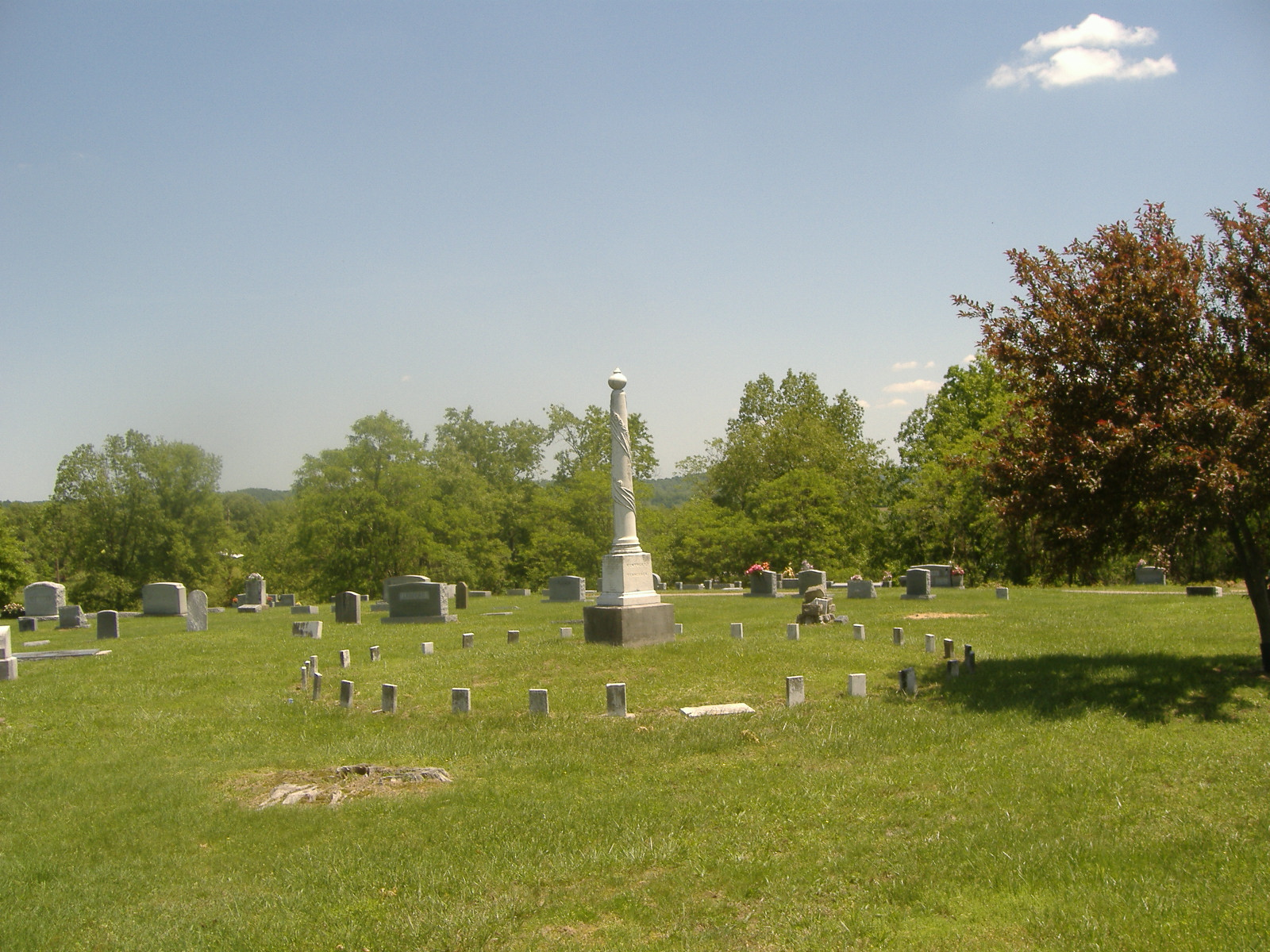

- Location within Kentucky Location within the United States
- Location: Crab Orchard Cemetery. 0.5 mi E of jct. of KY 39 and KY 643, Crab Orchard, Kentucky
- Built: 1872
- MPS: Civil War Monuments of Kentucky MPS
- NRHP reference No.: 97000682
- Added to NRHP: July 17, 1997

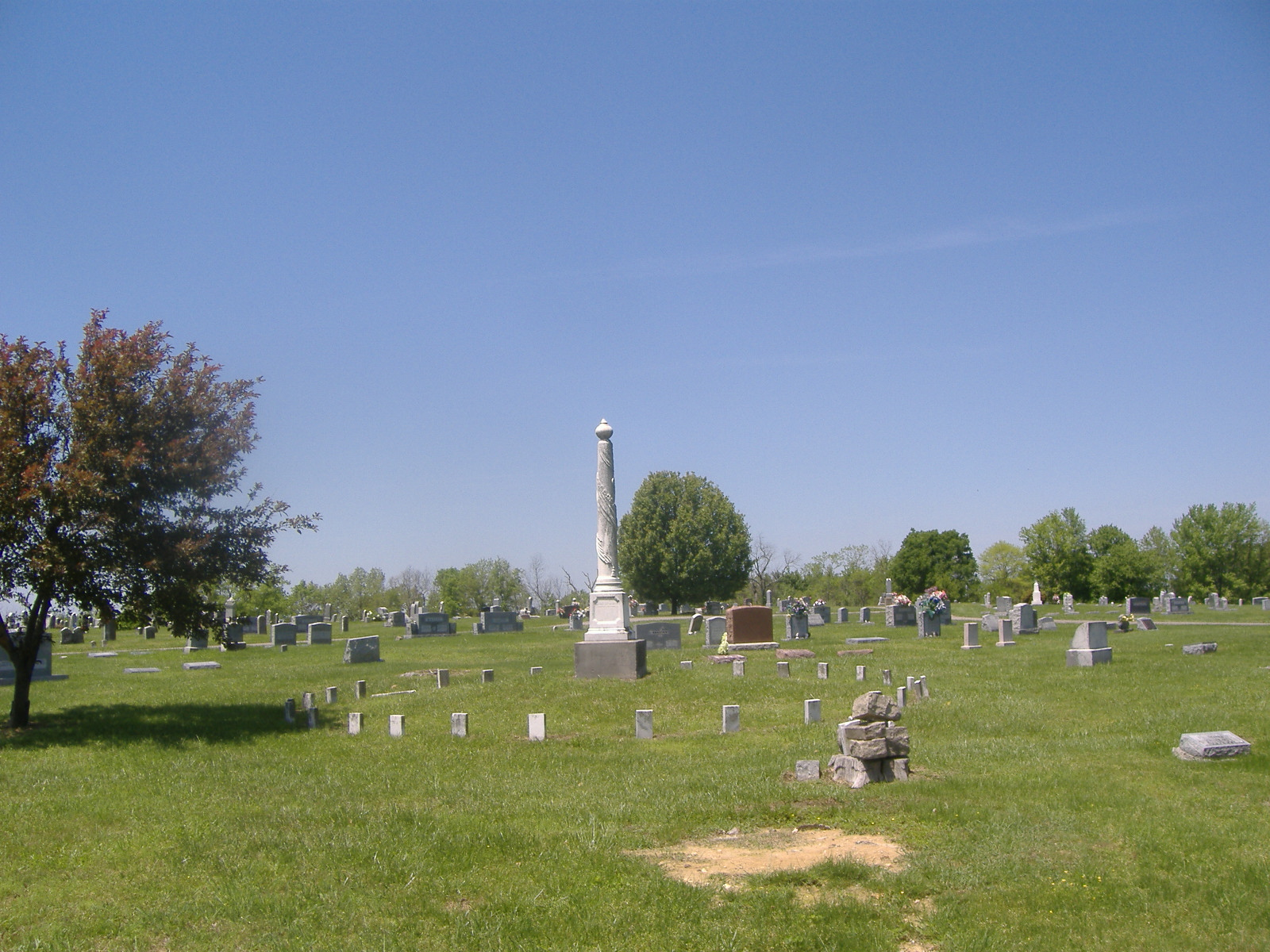

The Confederate Monument in Crab Orchard in Lincoln County, Kentucky, near Crab Orchard, Kentucky, commemorates the fallen Confederate soldiers of nearby states. Many of those buried here died at the Battle of Wildcat Mountain.

The soldiers buried around the monument were from Kentucky, Georgia, Tennessee, and Texas. Twenty-one in total, they were reinterred atop the Crab Orchard Hill in 1871.

The monument itself is a 10 feet (3.0 m) tall column made of white marble. The inscriptions mention the home states of the soldiers buried around the monument, with the motto "Constantes Esque Ad Mortem, Animas Perjecere." on the north side, and a lengthier passage on the south side reading "Here, off duty till the last reveille, rest the Southern soldiers, few in number, who were slain in this and in the adjoining counties, during the War of Secession. They fell among strangers, unknown, unfriended, yet not unhonered [sic]; for strangers' hands have gathered their ashes here and placed this shaft above them, that constancy, valor, sacrifice of self, though displayed in fruitless enterprise, may not be unremembered." The monument was deliberately carved to appear draped by a Confederate flag.

On July 17, 1997, the Confederate Monument in Crab Orchard was one of sixty-one different monuments related to the Civil War in Kentucky placed on the National Register of Historic Places, as part of the Civil War Monuments of Kentucky Multiple Property Submission. Only the Confederate Monument in Cynthiana in Cynthiana, Kentucky has been at the same place longer, with the 32nd Indiana Monument the only other monument in Kentucky older than the two.

In June 2007 the monument was again dedicated in a ceremony that included then Kentucky Governor Ernie Fletcher, the U.S. Army, Shriners, and a parade.
