= Charles Lynn Pyatt =

American theologian (1886–1960)

Charles Lynn Pyatt (February 25, 1886—November 19, 1960), was an American theologian, Christian minister, educator, and author. He served as dean of the College of Bible (now Lexington Theological Seminary) in Lexington, Kentucky.

== Biography ==
Pyatt was born on February 25, 1886, in Jacksonville, Illinois. He was educated at Transylvania University, where he received his A.B. degree in 1911 and A.M. degree in 1912. Then he attended Yale Divinity School where he was awarded his Bachelor of Divinity Degree in 1913. Later he attended Harvard Divinity School and there received a Doctor of Theology degree in 1915.

He was affiliated with the Christian Church (Disciples of Christ). He was a member of the Young Men’s Christian Association (YMCA) in France, from 1917 until 1919. He was a member of the American Oriental Society starting in 1917.

Pyatt died on November 19, 1960 in Fayette County, Kentucky, and is buried in the Lexington Cemetery.
