= Lexington National Cemetery =

Historic veterans cemetery in Fayette County, Kentucky

- U.S. National Register of Historic Places
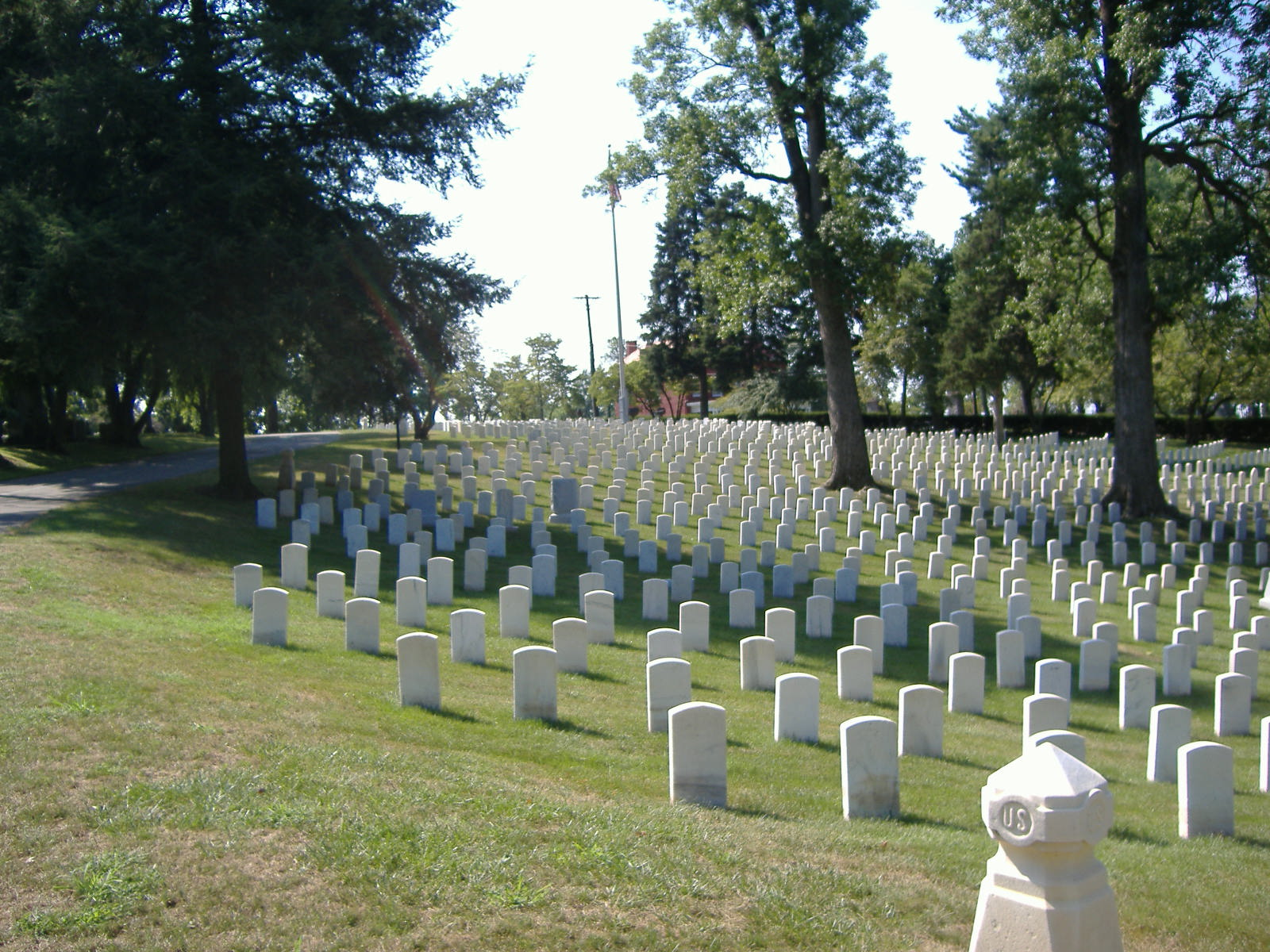

- Location within Kentucky Location within the United States
- Location: Lexington, Kentucky
- Coordinates: 38°03′28″N 84°30′40″W
- Built: 1868
- MPS: Civil War Era National Cemeteries MPS
- NRHP reference No.: 98001135
- Added to NRHP: September 3, 1998

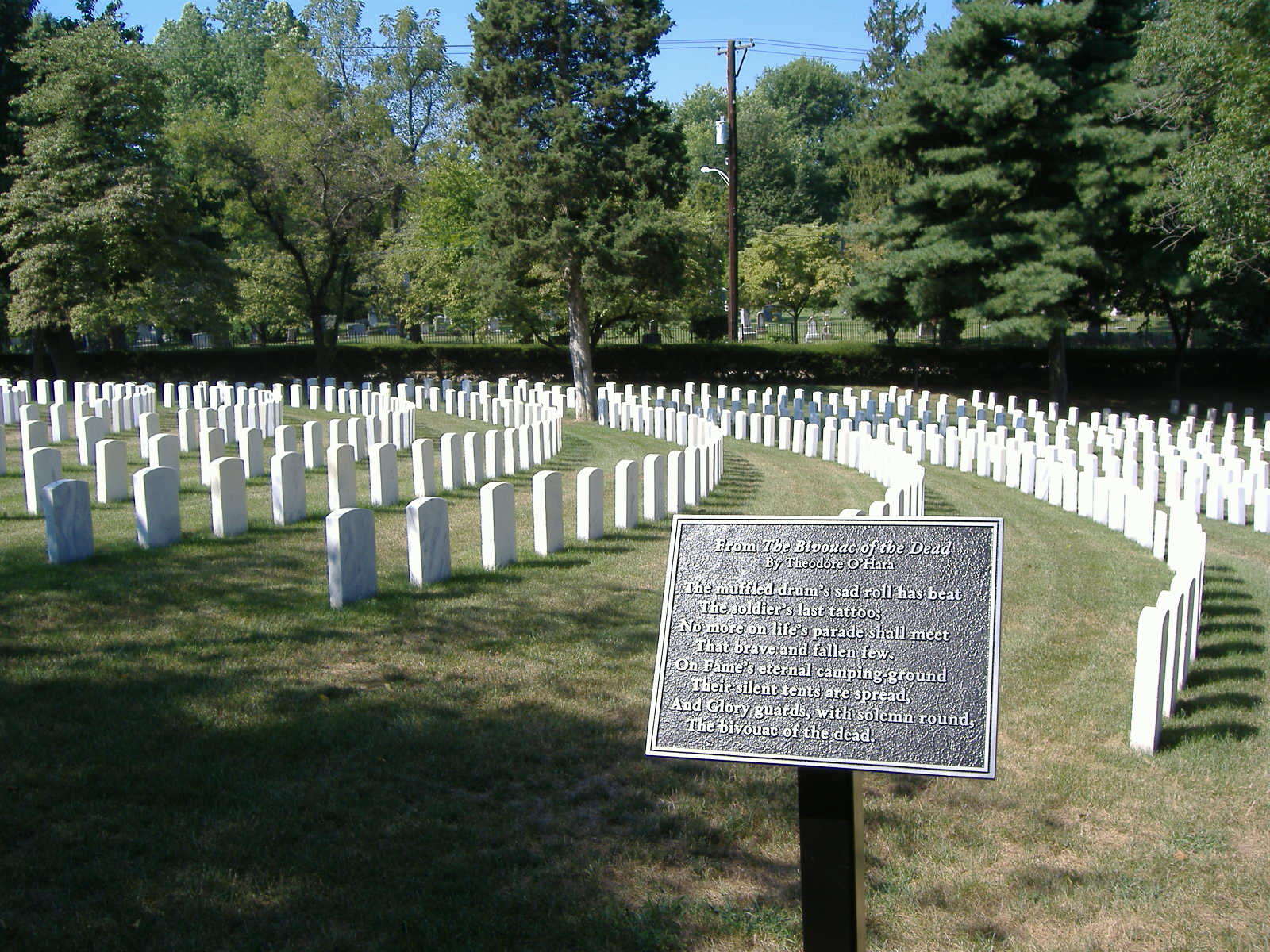
Plaque with poem overlooking the graves

Lexington National Cemetery is a United States National Cemetery located in the city of Lexington, Kentucky. Administered by the United States Department of Veterans Affairs, it encompasses less than 4,050 square meters (1.00 acre), and as of 2014 had approximately 1,700 interments. It is closed to new interments.

== History ==
Lexington National Cemetery was originally a military section of the Lexington Cemetery which was first used to inter American Civil War casualties in 1861. After the war, several makeshift battlefield cemeteries had their remains moved to Lexington. In 1863, the lot was officially designated a National Cemetery, and in 1867, an additional 1,500 square meters (0.37 acres) were purchased by the federal government to increase the lot to its current size.

Lexington National Cemetery was listed on National Register of Historic Places in 1998.
