= Henry Brainerd McClellan =

Henry Brainerd McClellan (October 17, 1840 – October 1, 1904) was an officer and adjutant general in the Confederate States Army during the American Civil War (Civil War), a teacher and author. He was a professor at Sayre Female Institute in Lexington, Kentucky, for 35 years after the war.

== Early life ==
Henry Brainerd McClellan was born at Philadelphia, Pennsylvania, on October 17, 1840. His family had come from Connecticut where his great-grandfather, Samuel McClellan, was a general of Connecticut troops in the American Revolutionary War. He was a son of surgeon and oculist Samuel McClellan. He had four brothers who fought for the Union during the Civil War. One of them, Carswell (born 1836) was a lieutenant and assistant adjutant general to Union Army Major General Andrew A. Humphreys. Henry was a first cousin of Union Major General George B. McClellan, who twice commanded the Army of the Potomac.

After studying for the ministry at Williams College, from which he graduated in 1858 aged 17, McClellan moved to Stony Point Mills in Cumberland County, Virginia, where he became a schoolteacher.

Henry McClellan married Catherine Macon Matthews of Cumberland County, Virginia, on December 12, 1863. They had nine children, although only five survived Henry.

== American Civil War service ==
Shortly after the outbreak of the Civil War, on June 14, 1861, Henry McClellan enlisted in Company G, 3rd Virginia Volunteer Cavalry Regiment in Ashland, Virginia. He became a lieutenant and adjutant general of the regiment on May 18, 1862.

McClellan was promoted to major on April 15, 1863, and on May 2, 1863, was appointed adjutant-general to Major General J. E. B. Stuart after the death of Stuart's previous adjutant general, Channing Price, at the Battle of Chancellorsville. On June 9, 1863, McClellan's quick action as Stuart went to another part of the field helped the Confederates save the key position of Fleetwood Hill at the Battle of Brandy Station, Virginia. After the surprise appearance of a large Union force near Brandy Station in the early morning Stuart left McClellan and a few others, mainly couriers, at Fleetwood Hill while he went to organize and lead his forces. As the battle progressed, Union troops led by the 1st New Jersey Cavalry began to climb Fleetwood Hill. McClellan ordered the crew of the sole available artillery piece, commanded by Lieutenant John W. Carter, to fire their last few shells of ammunition, which had been set aside as defective, to stall the approaching Union regiment. The New Jersey cavalrymen held back long enough to allow the 12th Virginia Cavalry Regiment to charge over the top of the hill and engage them. Additional regiments from both armies joined the fight for the hill and Stuart brought up more artillery pieces. Eventually the Confederates secured possession of the hill.

As Stuart's chief of staff, McClellan accompanied and greatly assisted Stuart during the Gettysburg campaign. Soon after the start of the Stuart's ride around the Union Army of the Potomac, McClellan, other staff officers Andrew Reid Venable Jr. and John Esten Cooke and a courier, were eating breakfast at the home of a blacksmith while the blacksmith shoed their horses. The Confederate officers were about a half mile from the main body of Brigadier General Wade Hampton III's cavalry division when advance riders from the 11th Regiment New York Volunteer Cavalry rode by in pursuit of the advance guard of Hampton's division during the Battle of Fairfax Court House (June 1863). McClellan, Venables and the courier quickly fled toward their main body but Cooke was intent on finishing his breakfast and having his horse shoed. He barely escaped when a second group of Union riders became suspicious of the nature of activity at the farm and rode up to check.

In the winter of 1863–1864, one of Henry's brothers, a captain on the staff of Union Major General George Meade, passed through the lines near Orange Court House, Virginia, so that they might commiserate upon the death of a sister in Philadelphia.

When Stuart was mortally wounded at the Battle of Yellow Tavern, Virginia, on May 11, 1864, he passed command to Major General Fitzhugh Lee and ordered McClellan to assist Lee while other staff members accompanied him on list last journey to Richmond. After the battle, McClellan traveled to Stuart's bedside and was there when he died. Stuart gave his bay horse to McClellan and asked him to perform a few final tasks, showing his feelings and trust in his adjutant. After Stuart's death, McClellan served for three months on the staff of General Robert E. Lee. On August 11, 1864, he was appointed major and assistant adjutant general to Major General Wade Hampton III

Henry McClellan was paroled at Greensboro, North Carolina, on April 26, 1865.

== Post-war ==
McClellan was in Cumberland County for three years after the war but sources do not show what work he did during this time. In 1869, McClellan moved to Lexington, Kentucky, where he accepted a position at Sayre Female Institute as a professor. He became principal in 1870. He was a professor at Sayre until his death in 1904. He also was active in Confederate veteran activities.

In 1885, Henry McClellan published The Life and Campaigns of Major General J. E. B. Stuart.

Henry Brainerd McClellan died of a stroke in Lexington, Kentucky. He is buried in Lexington Cemetery at Lexington, Kentucky.
