= Leslie Combs (soldier and politician) =

American politician

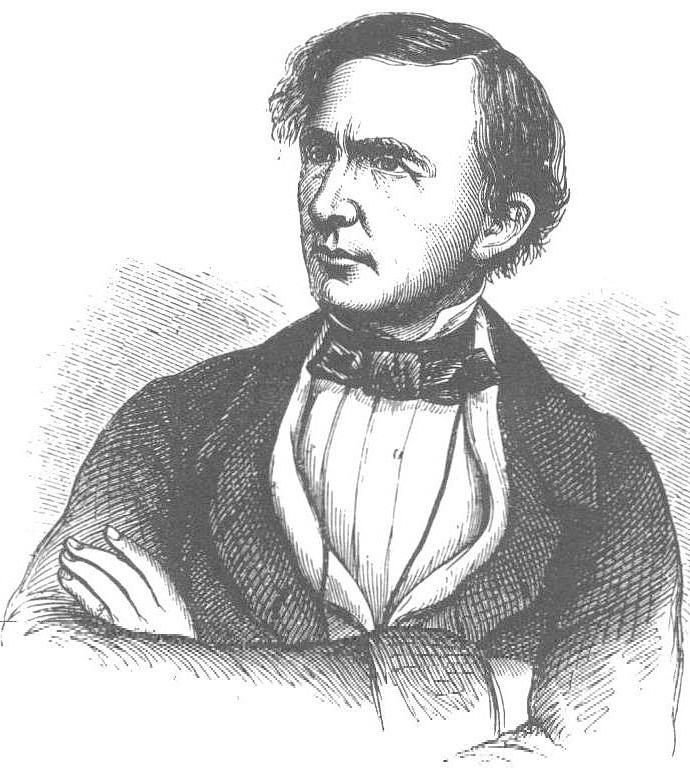

Clerk of the Kentucky Court of Appeals
- In office 1860–1866

Speaker of the Kentucky House of Representatives
- In office 1846

Member of the Kentucky House of Representatives
- In office 1827-1829; 1833-1835; 1845-1847; 1857-1859

Personal details
- Born: November 28, 1793 Clark County, Kentucky
- Died: August 22, 1881 (aged 87) Lexington, Kentucky
- Resting place: Lexington Cemetery
- Party: Whig; Union Democratic
- Spouse(s): Margaret Trotter; Mary Elizabeth Brownell Man
- Relations: Son-in-law of Thomas Church Brownell
- Profession: Lawyer

Military service
- Allegiance: United States
- Branch/service: Militia
- Years of service: 1812–1813
- Rank: Captain
- Unit: 1st Regiment Kentucky Volunteers
- Battles/wars: War of 1812

Leslie Combs (November 28, 1793 – August 22, 1881) was a lawyer and politician from the U.S. state of Kentucky. He served under William Henry Harrison and Green Clay during the War of 1812 and was captured in 1813. After his release, he studied law and was admitted to the bar in 1818. In 1827, he was elected as a Whig to the first of several non-consecutive terms in the Kentucky House of Representatives. He was re-elected in 1833, 1845, and 1857, and served as Speaker of the House in 1846. He lost a bid for a seat in the U.S. House of Representatives to Democrat John C. Breckinridge in 1851. His last political office was clerk of the Kentucky Court of Appeals, which he held from 1860 to 1866, when he retired from public life. He died in 1881 and was buried in Lexington Cemetery.

== Early life ==
Leslie Combs was born November 28, 1793, in Clark County, Kentucky. He was the youngest of twelve children born to Benjamin Combs, an officer in the Revolutionary War, and Sarah (Richardson) Combs, a Quaker from Maryland. His early education was obtained in a private school operated by Reverend John Lyle. Later, he became a deputy clerk in the office of S. H. Woodson, a lawyer from Jessamine County.

At the outbreak of the War of 1812, Combs enlisted in the 1st Regiment Kentucky Volunteers under William Henry Harrison, but was soon transferred to the command of Green Clay. By April 1813, he was promoted to captain over a scouting unit. On the evening of May 1, 1813, Combs and a detachment of six men were dispatched by Colonel William Dudley from Fort Defiance to the besieged Fort Meigs. As they canoed down the Maumee River, they were ambushed by Potawatomi, and two of Combs' men were killed. He quickly returned to General Green Clay at Fort Defiance to report that Fort Meigs was under siege and in need of aid. After two days, he arrived back at Fort Defiance to find Clay already preparing to march to Fort Meigs. Badly injured, he was ordered to bed by medical personnel, but upon finding two small companies of spies ready to operate under his command, he secured new clothes and joined Clay's march. He was wounded and captured by the enemy on May 5, 1813.

After his parole, Combs discontinued his military service and relocated to Lexington, Kentucky, where he read law with Samuel Q. Richardson. In 1818, he was admitted to the bar. He married Margaret Trotter on September 1, 1818, and the couple had eleven children.

== Legal and legislative career ==
In 1827, Combs was elected as a Whig to the Kentucky House of Representatives, serving until 1829. In 1830, he was one of twenty incorporators of the Lexington and Ohio Railroad. He was once again elected to the state House of Representatives in 1833 and was appointed to the Committee on Internal Improvements.

Responding to Stephen F. Austin's call for assistance against Mexico in 1836, Combs raised a volunteer regiment, but it was disbanded by President Andrew Jackson before being deployed. As a delegate to the Whig National Convention in 1840, Combs worked to nominate Henry Clay for the presidency, but when Clay failed to secure the nomination, he campaigned for the party's eventual nominee, William Henry Harrison. He was elected for a third time to the Kentucky House of Representatives in 1845 and served as Speaker of the House in 1846.

In 1846, Combs raised a regiment to participate in the Mexican–American War, but he resigned after not being selected to command it. His first wife having died, Combs married Mary Elizabeth (Brownell) Man, daughter of Episcopal Bishop Thomas Church Brownell, on April 11, 1849. They had three children. His eldest son was the Hon. Leslie Combs, Lexington horse breeder and diplomat. He was Minister to Guatemala, Honduras and Peru under the administration of President Theodore Roosevelt.

After losing his campaign for an open seat in the U.S. House of Representatives to Democrat John C. Breckinridge, Combs was again elected to the Kentucky House of Representatives in 1855. That year, he also became president of the Lexington and Danville Railroad. His legislative term ended in 1859, and he was elected clerk of the Kentucky Court of Appeals in 1860. Combs was a strong Unionist during the American Civil War.

== Death ==
Combs did not seek reelection as clerk in 1866 and retired from public life. He died at home in Lexington on August 22, 1881, and was buried in Lexington Cemetery.
