= Hunt–Morgan House =

Historic Federal style residence in Lexington, KY, US

- U.S. Historic district – Contributing property
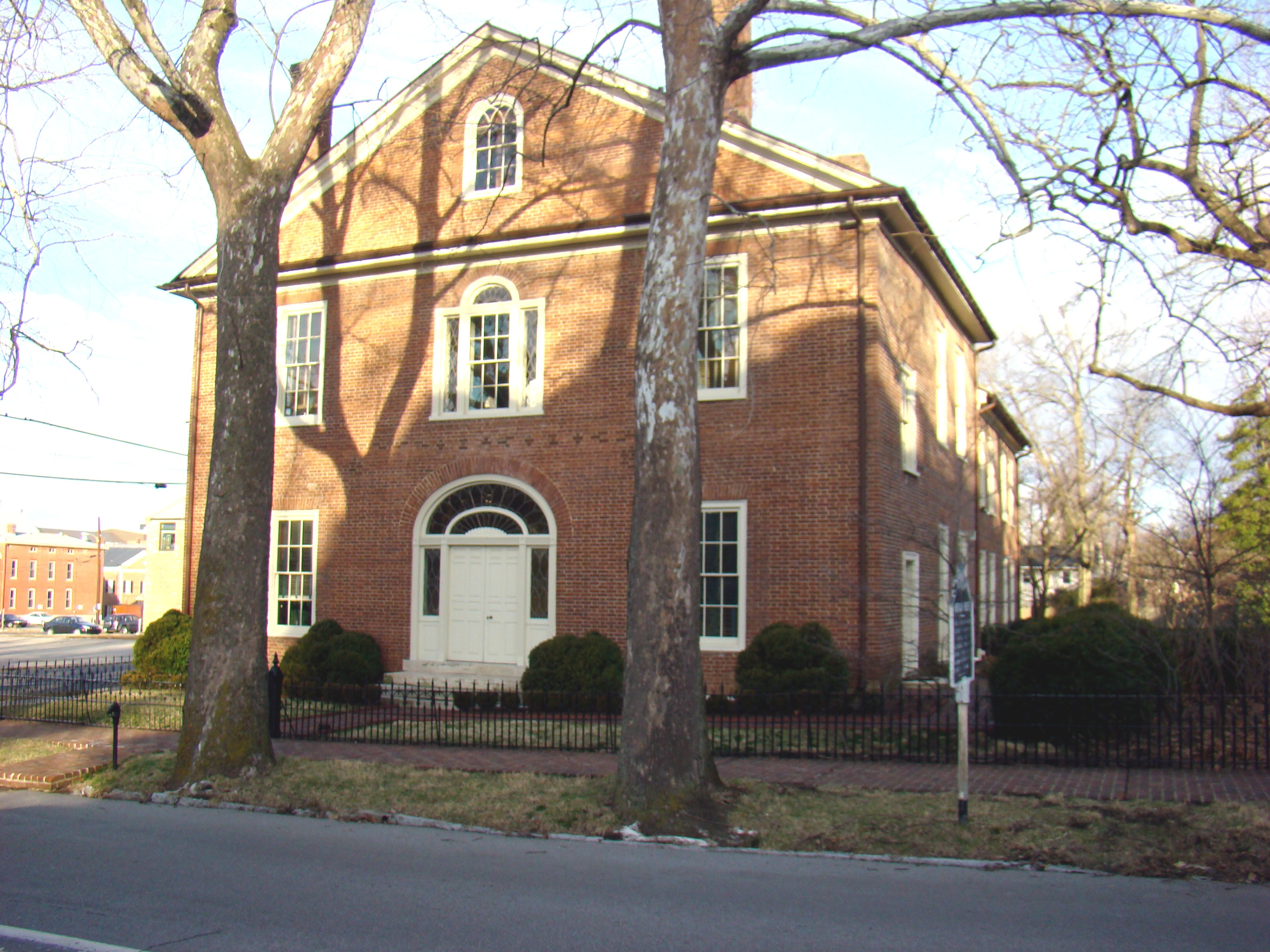

- Location within Kentucky Location within the United States
- Location: 201 N. Mill Street., Lexington, Kentucky
- Coordinates: 38°3′0″N 84°29′47″W
- Built: 1814
- Architectural style: Federal style
- Part of: Gratz Park Historic District (ID73000796)
- Added to NRHP: March 14, 1973

The Hunt–Morgan House, historically known as Hopemont, is a Federal style residence in Lexington, Kentucky built in 1814 by John Wesley Hunt, the first millionaire west of the Alleghenies. The house is included in the Gratz Park Historic District. The Alexander T. Hunt Civil War Museum is located on the second floor of the Hunt–Morgan House.

Other notable people who resided at Hopemont include John Wesley Hunt's great-grandson, Thomas Hunt Morgan. Born in the house in 1866, he became the first Kentuckian to win the Nobel Prize in Physiology or Medicine.

The Morgans at Hopemont, c1870. J. Winston Coleman, Jr., Collection, Transylvania University

The house has many architectural features, including the Palladian window with fan and sidelights that grace its front façade. In 1955 the Blue Grass Trust for Historic Preservation was formed to save this home from impending demolition. The organization restored the home to its Federal appearance.

The Hunt–Morgan House is located on the corner of Mill and Second Streets, at 201 N. Mill Street, in Gratz Park in Lexington, Kentucky.

== See also ==
- John Hunt Morgan Memorial
