= John C. Breckinridge Memorial =

- U.S. National Register of Historic Places
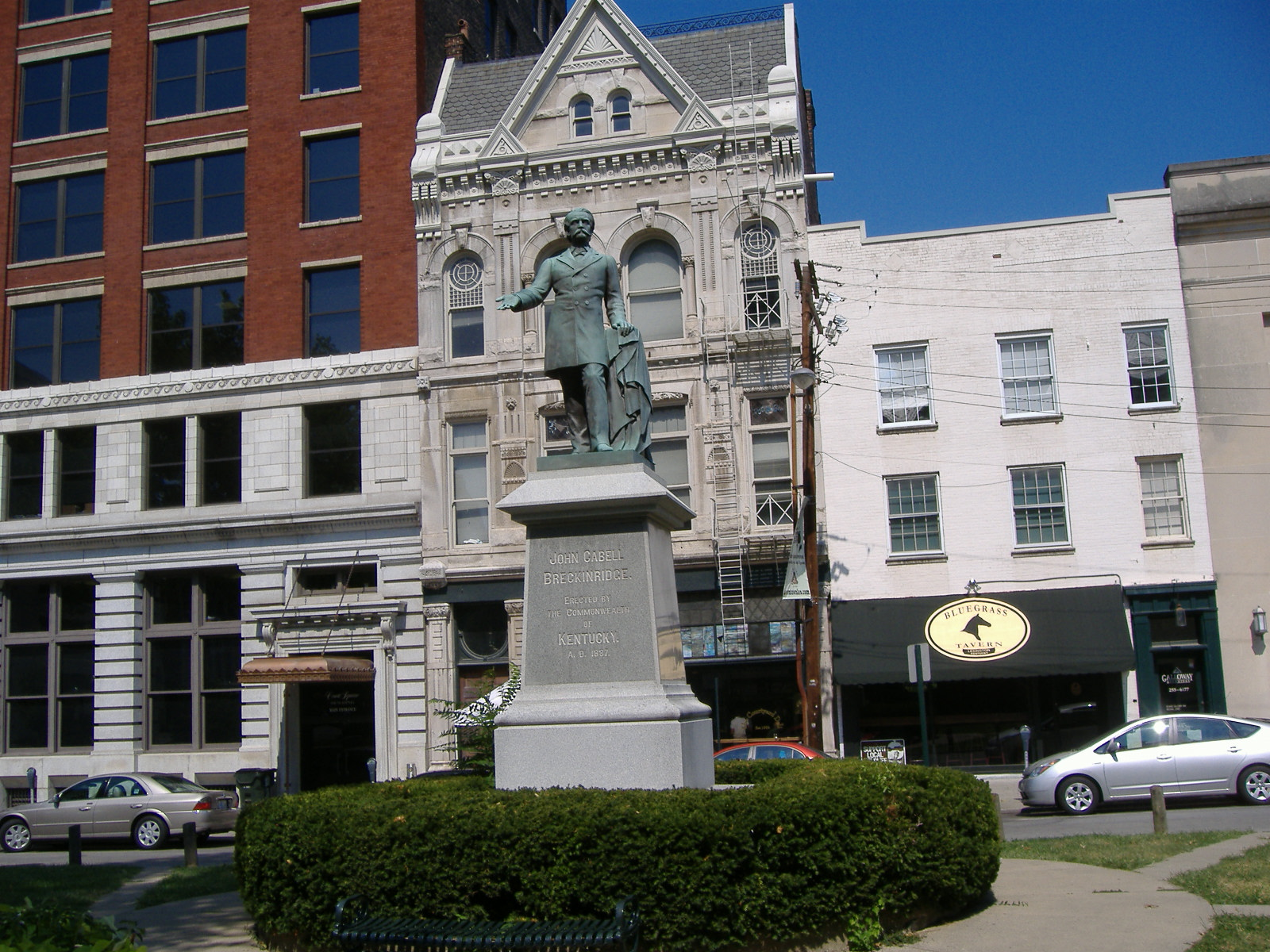

- Location within Kentucky Location within the United States
- Location: Lexington, Kentucky
- Built: 1887
- Architect: Henry-Bonnard Bronze Co., NY
- MPS: Civil War Monuments of Kentucky MPS
- NRHP reference No.: 97000705
- Added to NRHP: July 17, 1997

The John C. Breckinridge Memorial, originally on the courthouse lawn of Lexington, Kentucky, was placed on the National Register of Historic Places on July 17, 1997, as part of the Civil War Monuments of Kentucky MPS. It commemorates John C. Breckinridge, who was born and died in Lexington. He was vice president for James Buchanan and ran against Abraham Lincoln in the 1860 United States presidential election, winning nine Southern states. He served in the Confederate States Army, and was the last Confederate States Secretary of War, fleeing the country after the South lost.

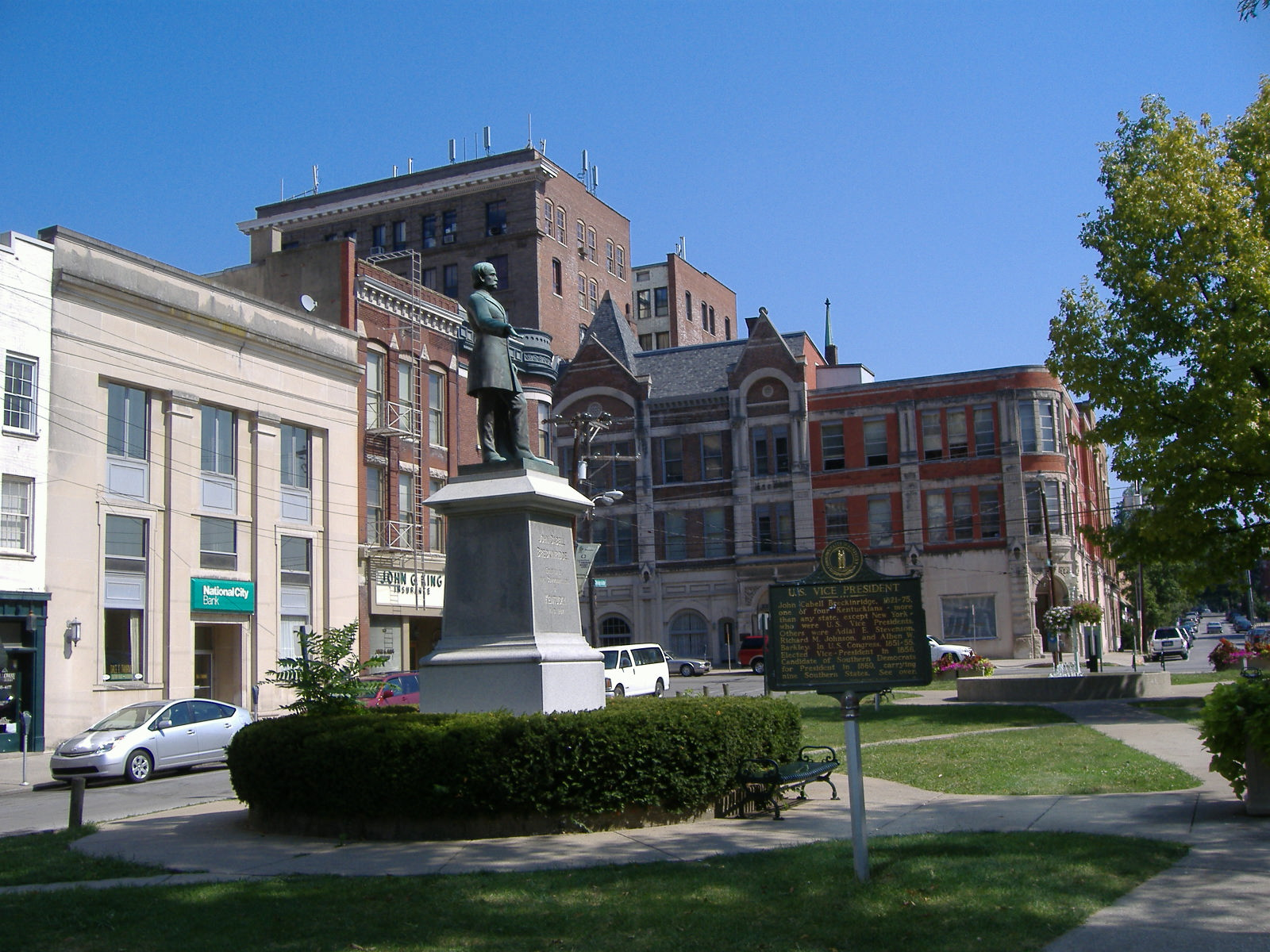
Side view

The memorial was prepared by New York's Henry-Bonnard Bronze Company. The original pedestal was made of granite, with the statue cast in bronze. Breckinridge is seen standing contraposto. The state government of Kentucky funded the construction of the monument.

Breckinridge's memorial was built in 1887, 24 years before the John Hunt Morgan Memorial, also formerly on the courthouse lawn and part of the Civil War Monuments of Kentucky MPS.

The statues had stood on Main Street on the same plot of ground where slave auctions were held before the Civil War.

In 2010, the monument was moved about 50 feet to a new location facing Main Street. This was done as part of the Cheapside pavilion construction project. The Old Fayette County Courthouse was renovated and reopened in 2018 to serve as a tourism, entertainment, and office hub.

== Removal from original site ==
In November 2015, a committee, the Urban County Arts Review Board, voted to recommend removal of both the Breckinridge statue and the Morgan statue. In February 2016 Lexington mayor Jim Gray announced the statues would stay, but later advocated to remove them after receiving pressure from local grassroots organizing. The monuments were removed October 17, 2017. In November 2017, the Lexington-Fayette Urban County Council approved an agreement to relocate the Breckinridge and Morgan statues to the Lexington Cemetery. The relocation was completed in July 2018. An endowment, funded by private donations, covered the cost of removal, and will pay for future maintenance and security. The Breckinridge statue, with a new pedestal, was placed in his family's burial area in Section G. Morgan's statue, without its pedestal, was placed in the Confederate section of the cemetery.
