= Lexington Cemetery =

Coordinates: 38°03′40″N 84°30′32″W

- Lexington Cemetery and Henry Clay Monument
- U.S. National Register of Historic Places
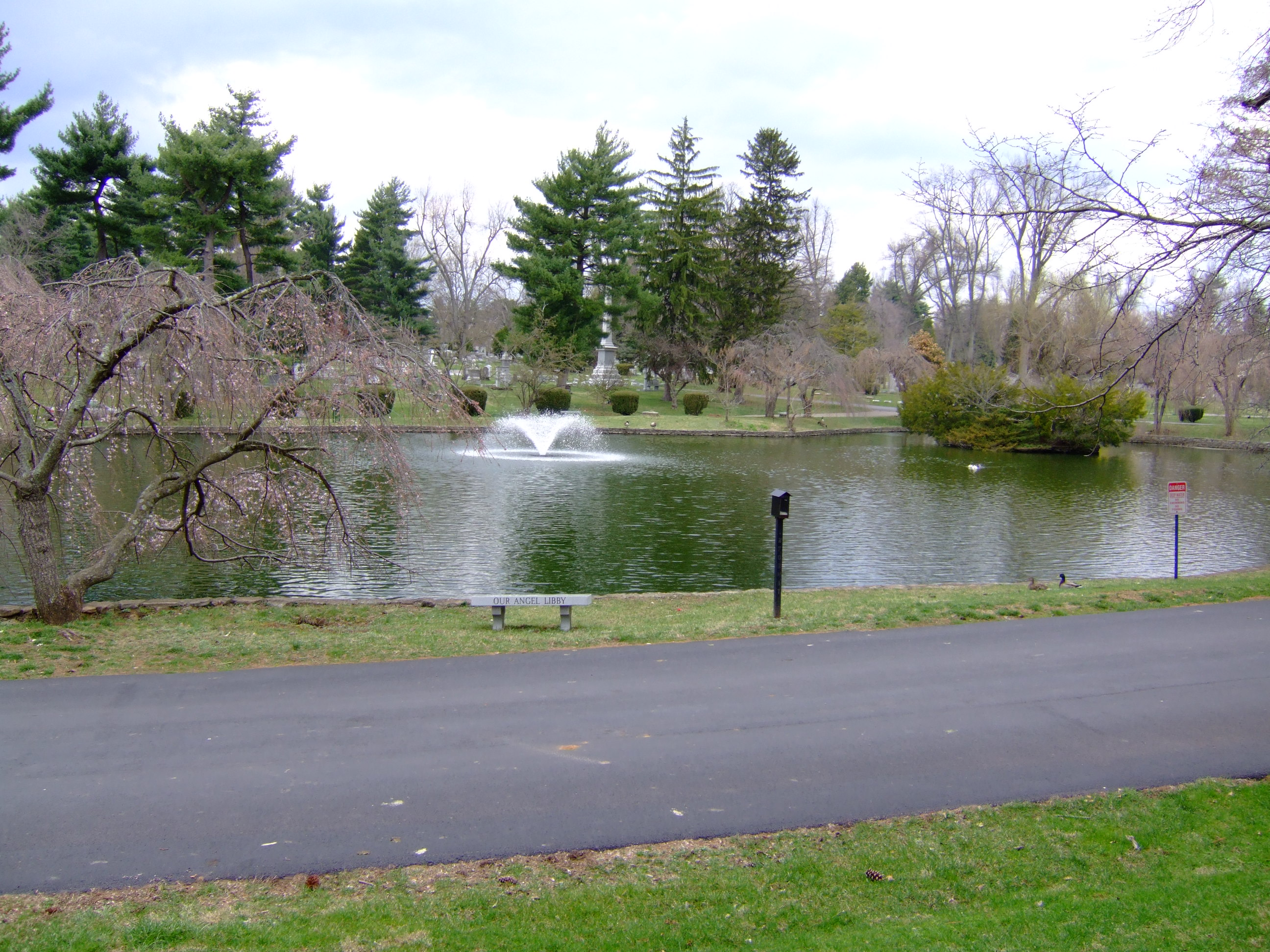
- One of the ponds at Lexington Cemetery

- Location within Kentucky Location within the United States
- Location: Lexington, Kentucky
- Area: 170 acres (69 ha)
- Built: 1849
- Architect: Adams, Julius W.; et al.
- Architectural style: Gothic, Romanesque
- NRHP reference No.: 76000873
- Added to NRHP: July 12, 1976

Lexington Cemetery is a private, non-profit 170-acre (69 ha) rural cemetery and arboretum located at 833 W. Main Street, Lexington, Kentucky.

The Lexington Cemetery was established in 1848 as a place of beauty and a public cemetery, in part to deal with burials from the 1833 cholera epidemic in the area. What became Lexington National Cemetery was established in 1861 to inter American Civil War casualties. It was designed by Charles S. Bell and John Lutz. It was originally 40 acres but has expanded to 170 acres with more than 64,000 interments.

Its plantings include boxwood, cherries, crabapples, dogwoods, magnolias, taxus, as well as flowers such as begonias, chrysanthemums, irises, jonquils, lantanas, lilies, and tulips. Also on the grounds is an American basswood (Tilia Americana), which the cemetery claims to be the largest in the world. However, this claim is not supported by the National Register of Big Trees, which claims that the largest American Basswood is located in Montgomery County, Pennsylvania.

== Monuments ==
Two Confederate monuments were originally built in the cemetery, Confederate Soldier Monument in Lexington Ladies' Confederate Memorial (1874) and Confederate Soldier Monument in Lexington (1893). In 2018, two additional Confederate monuments were relocated here from downtown Lexington: John C. Breckinridge Memorial and John Hunt Morgan Memorial. All four monuments are individually listed on the National Register of Historic Places.

== Some notable people ==
The Lexington Cemetery maintains a list of notable interments. Others are listed here:

=== A ===
- George Madison Adams (1837–1920) – Civil War veteran, U.S. Congressman
- James Lane Allen (1849–1925) – author

=== B ===
- Milton K. Barlow (1818–1891) – planetarium inventor
- Frances Estill Beauchamp (1860–1923) – temperance activist, social reformer, lecturer
- James Burnie Beck (1822–1890) – Senator
- Charles Henry Berryman (1867–1946) – Gen Mgr for James Ben Ali Haggin's Elmendorf Farm 1904–1914, Lexington Postmaster 1915–1917, President/part owner of the Phoenix Hotel (Lexington, Kentucky) 1920
- Henry M. Bosworth (1860–1942) – Kentucky auditor of public accounts from 1912 to 1916, Kentucky state treasurer from 1904 to 1908
- Clifton R. Breckinridge (1846–1932) – John Cabell Breckinridge's son
- John Cabell Breckinridge (1821–1875) – U.S. Vice President, Civil War Confederate Major General
- Gay Brewer (1932–2007) – golfer
- Charles Jacob Bronston (1848–1909) – Commonwealth's Atty 10th Jud'l. Dist. 1879–1895, Senator Kentucky Senate 1896–1900, respected local attorney
- Charles Jacob Bronston, Jr (1882–1961) – Democrat. Kentucky House of Representatives 76th District 1940–1941 and 49th District 1948–1951
- John Y. Brown Jr. (1933–2022) – Governor of Kentucky, 1979–1983, one-time owner of Kentucky Fried Chicken (KFC), Boston Celtics and other business ventures.
- Sanders Dewees Bruce (1825–1902) – Civil War Union Army general
- Aylette Buckner (1806–1869) – U.S. Congressman
- Joseph Henry Bush (1794–1865) – portraitist
- Abraham Buford (1820–1884) – Civil War Confederate Army officer, turfman

=== C ===
- Henry Clay (1777–1852) – antebellum Speaker of the House, three-time U.S. presidential candidate, architect of the Missouri Compromise
- James Brown Clay (1817–1864) – U.S. Congressman
- Laura Clay (1849–1941) – Suffragist
- Mary Barr Clay (1839–1924) – Women's Suffrage movement leader
- John Winston Coleman Jr. (1898–1983) – historian, author
- Leslie Combs (1793–1881) – War of 1812 veteran, general
- Robert Wickliffe Cooper (1831–1867) – Union Army officer – Civil War. Post-war service as 2nd Major of the 7th Cavalry (Gen. Geo. A. Custer). Died ignominiously before Little Big Horn.
- Jesse Orin Creech (1895–1948) – World War I Fighter Ace
- Rev Spencer Cooper, Trustee of Translyvania University 1829. Tended the sick in the cholera epidemic of 1833, became ill and never fully recovered. Minister of the Methodist Episcopal Church in Lexington. Owner of a Powder House (made gunpowder).

=== D ===
- Hoover Dawahare, (1928–2004), businessman and politician
- Mary Desha, (1850–1911), one of the four founders of Daughters of the American Revolution.
- Herman Lee Donovan, (1887–1964), fourth president of the University of Kentucky
- Benjamin Winslow Dudley (1785–1870), Gifted surgeon. Appointed chair of surgery and anatomy at Transylvania University 1809 and again in 1818. Pioneered surgical procedures, including removal of stones (lithotomy) and cranial surgery for epilepsy.
- Ethelbert Ludlow Dudley, Medical doctor and Civil War Colonel
- Basil Wilson Duke (1838–1916) – Confederate Civil War General
- George B. Duncan (1861–1950) – United States Army general in World War I
- Henry Clay Dunlap (1828–1872) – Civil War Union brevet brigadier general

=== E ===
- Andrew Eugene Erwin (1830–1863) – Civil War Confederate Army officer

=== F ===
- Joseph S. Fowler (1820–1902) – Senator
- Ralph Foody (1928–1999) – character actor.

=== G ===
- John R. Gaines (1928–2005) – thoroughbred pioneer, philanthropist
- John M. Gaver Sr. (1900–1982) – U.S. Hall of Fame racehorse trainer
- Phyllis George (1949–2020) – Miss America 1971, sportscaster, First Lady of Kentucky (1979–1983)
- Randall L. Gibson (1832–1892) – Senator, Civil War Confederate Army brevet brigadier general
- Alex B. Gordon - racehorse trainer, owner & breeder
- Thomas Boston Gordon (1816–1891) – a founder of Beta Theta Pi fraternity
- Gordon Granger (1822–1876) – Civil War Union Major general

=== H ===
- Henry Hampton Halley (1874–1965) – author of the Halley's Bible
- Roger Hanson (1827–1863) – Civil War Confederate brevet brigadier general
- Vernon Hatton (1936–2025) - professional basketball player
- Hal Price Headley (1888–1962) – racehorse owner/breeder. A founder of Keeneland Racecourse. National Museum of Racing and Hall of Fame
- Thomas H. Hunt (1815–1884) – Civil War Confederate Army officer
- Thomas Hughes (1789–1862) Owned the farm later called Elmendorf Farm from 1855 to 1862. When he bought it from Carter Harrison, Sr it was called Clifton.
- William Thomas Hughes (1832–1874) WT, son of Thomas, inherited the farm later called Elmendorf Farm in 1862. He began to buy land at high interest rates, and to build up the cattle herd. He was murdered by his uncle for defaulting on a loan.
- Sarah Gibson Humphreys (1830–1907), author, suffragist

=== J ===
- John Telemachus Johnson (1788–1856) – U.S. Congressman
- William Augustus Jones, Jr. (1934–2006) – minister and civil rights leader

=== K ===
- William P. Kimball (1857–1926) – U.S. Congressman

=== L ===
- Thomas Lewinski, architect

=== M ===
- Gene Markey (1895–1980) – Hollywood screenwriter and producer and highly decorated U.S. Naval officer – veteran of World War I and World War II
- Lucille P. Markey (1896–1982) – owner, Calumet Farm, wife of Gene Markey
- Alexander Marshall (1808–1884) – U.S. Congressman
- Thomas Alexander Marshall (1794–1871) – U.S. Congressman
- Henry Brainerd McClellan (1840–1904) – Civil War Confederate Army officer, author, educator
- Byron McClelland (1855–1897), renowned Thoroughbred racehorse owner/breeder
- Hugh McKee (1844–1871) – Naval officer
- John McMurtry (1812–1890), builder and architect
- John Hunt Morgan (1825–1864) – Civil War Confederate general

=== N ===
- C.M. Newton (1930–2018) - Hall of Fame college basketball coach and athletic director

=== O ===
- Howard W. Oots (1876–1955), Thoroughbred racehorse trainer, owner, breeder

=== P ===
- Katherine Pettit (1868–1936) – Cofounder of Hindman Settlement School with May Stone and the Pine Mountain Settlement School with Ethel de Long Zande
- Rev. Dr. Charles Lynn Pyatt, Dean of the College of the Bible

=== R ===
- James Reilly (1811–1863) – politician
- George Robertson (1790–1874) – U.S. Congressman
- Arthur B. Rouse (1874–1956) – U.S. Congressman
- Adolph Rupp (1901–1977) – Hall of Fame basketball coach

=== S ===
- George S. Shanklin (1807–1883) – U.S. Congressman
- Jouett Shouse (1879–1968) – U.S. Congressman
- Cincinnatus Shryock (1816–1888) – architect
- William "King" Solomon, (1775–1854) – Town Drunk, Town hero – The Cholera Epidemic of 1833 killed 500 townspeople in 2 months ... King Solomon stayed in Lexington to dig graves, earning the lasting respect of the town.
- May Stone (1867–1946) – Cofounder of Hindman Settlement School with Katherine Pettit
- King Swope (1893–1961) – U.S. Congressman

=== T ===
- Barak G. Thomas (1826–1906), Thoroughbred racehorse breeder
- Eliza Parker Todd – Wife of Robert Smith Todd and Mother of Mary Todd Lincoln
- Levi Todd (1756–1807), One of Lexington's founders and grandfather of Mary Todd Lincoln
- Lyman Beecher Todd, MD (18? – 1901) First cousin of Mary Todd Lincoln. Close friend of Lincoln. One of the doctors who helped treat the President the night of the assassination.
- Robert Smith Todd (1791–1849) Father of Mary Todd Lincoln, Son of Levi Todd
- William Henry Townsend (1890–1964) – historian and author

=== U–V ===
- Thomas R. Underwood (1898–1956) – U.S. Congressman, Senator
- Solomon Van Meter, Sr. (1818–1859) Farmer and importer of shorthorn cattle, Duncastle Farm
- Solomon Lee Van Meter (1859–1928) Member of Kentucky State Legislature elected 1899, Farmer. Son of Solomon Van Meter. Owner of Shenandoah Hall on the Bryan Station Pike.
- Solomon Lee Van Meter, Jr. (1888–1937) inventor of the Ripcord Backpack Parachute son of Solomon Lee Van Meter.
- 2nd Lt Solomon Lee Van Meter, III (1925–1953) Pilot died in Korean War, son of S.L. Van Meter, Jr.
- James Albert Varney, Sr. (1910–1985) – Jim Varney's father
- Jim Varney (1949–2000) – actor who was best known as Ernest P. Worrell
- Louise H. Varney (1913–1994) – Jim Varney's mother

=== W ===
- Elisha Warfield (1781–1859), physician, academic, Thoroughbred racehorse breeder
- Ethelbert Dudley Warfield (1861–1936), college president
- Howard J. Wells (1903–1955), Thoroughbred racehorse trainer, owner, breeder
- Daniel Carmichal "DC" Wickcliffe (1810–1870) Whig/Democrat, Secretary of State of Kentucky 1862–63, Newspaper owner and editor "Lexington Observer & Reporter" 1838–1865
- Katharine E. Wilkie (1904–1980) – author
- Elisha I. Winter (1781–1849) – U.S. Congressman
- Rev. Louisa Mariah Layman Woosley (1862–1952) – first woman ordained in the Presbyterian and Reformed tradition in 1889 by the Cumberland Presbyterian Church.

== See also ==
- List of botanical gardens in the United States
- List of burial places of presidents and vice presidents of the United States
