= Confederate Soldier Monument in Lexington =

- U.S. National Register of Historic Places
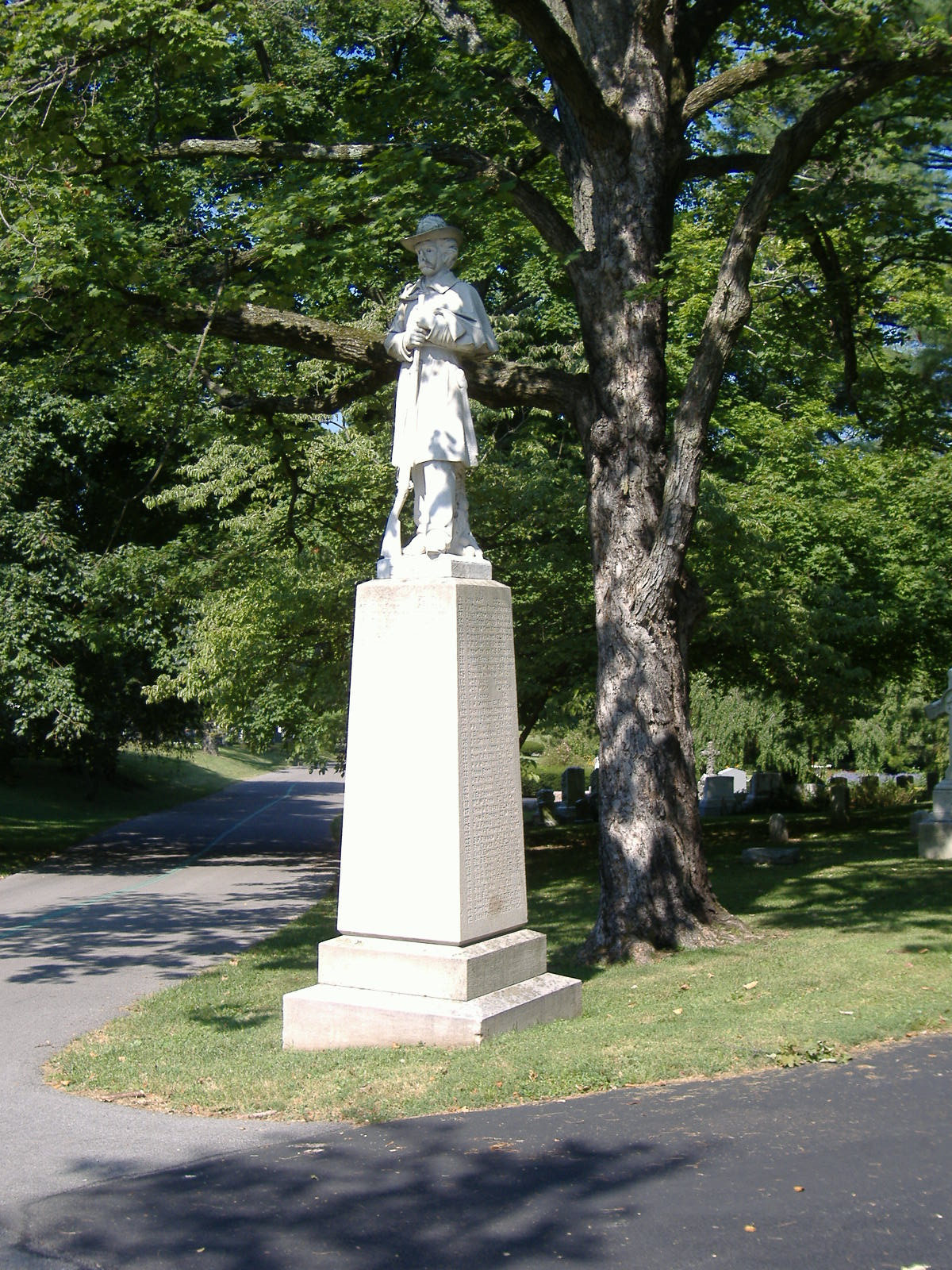

- Location within Kentucky Location within the United States
- Location: Lexington, Kentucky
- Built: 1893
- MPS: Civil War Monuments of Kentucky MPS
- NRHP reference No.: 97000703
- Added to NRHP: July 17, 1997

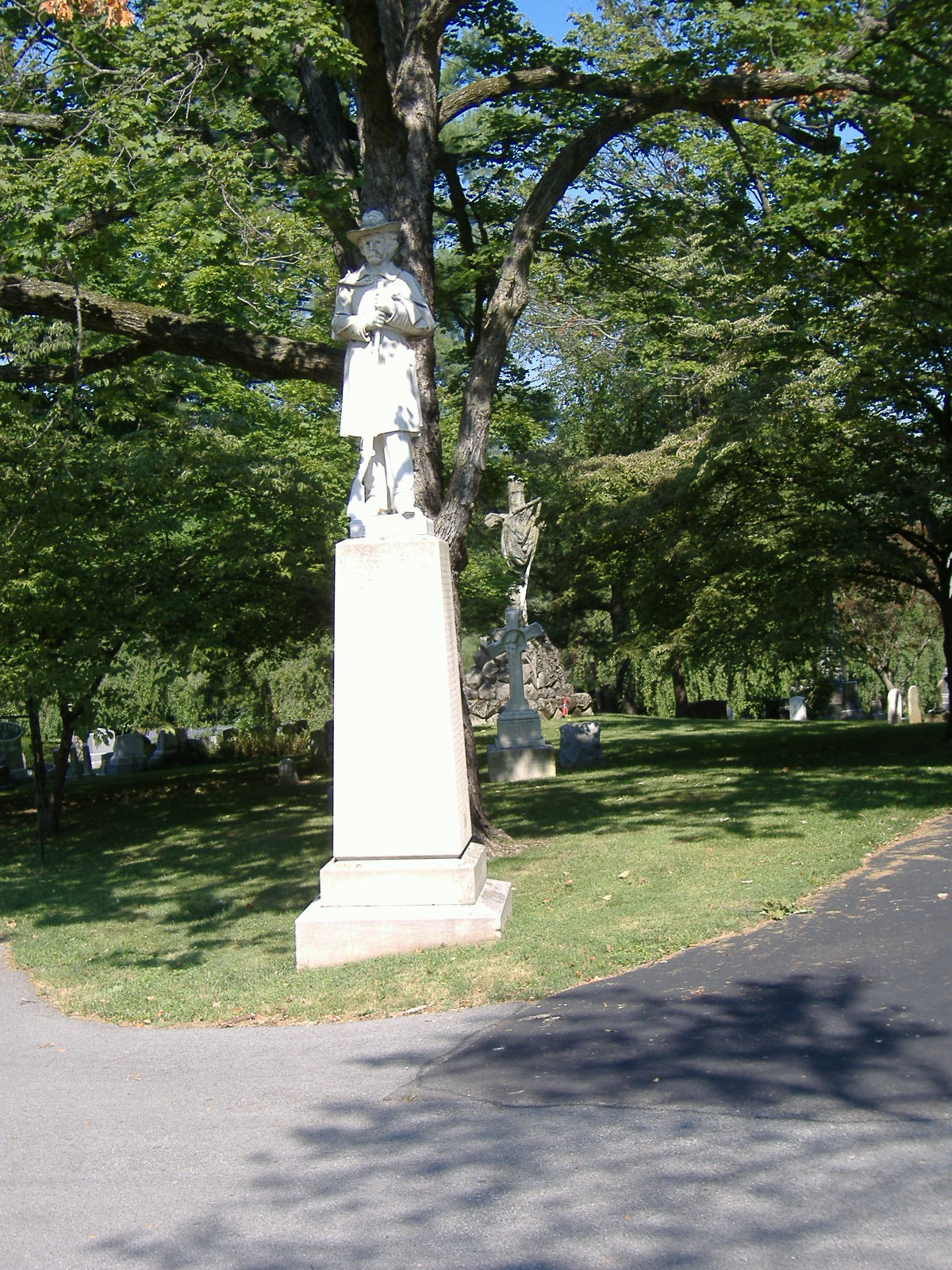
Front view, with Ladies' Confederate Memorial in background

Confederate Soldier Monument in Lexington, in Lexington Cemetery in Lexington, Kentucky, was placed on the National Register of Historic Places on July 17, 1997, as part of the Civil War Monuments of Kentucky MPS.

Close to the Monument is the Ladies' Confederate Memorial, also part of the Civil War Monuments of Kentucky MPS. Four residents of Lexington with means funded the construction of the monuments, buying a statue built in Carrara, Italy from a catalog, and in 1893 was erected by the Muldoon Monument Company. The names of 160 veterans of the Confederate Army are inscribed on the monolith.
