= Ladies' Confederate Memorial =

- Ladies' Confederate Memorial, The
- U.S. National Register of Historic Places
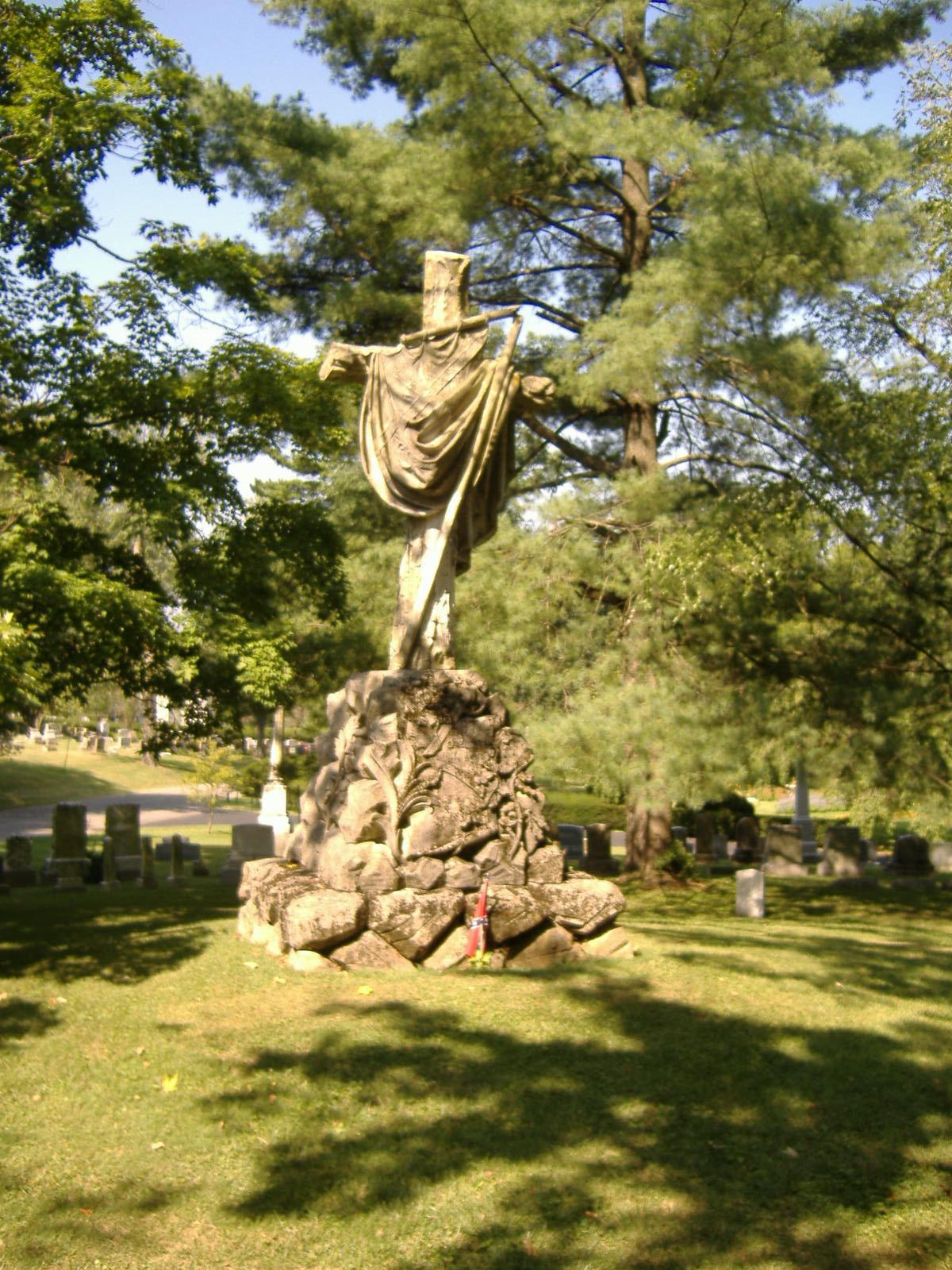

- Location within Kentucky Location within the United States
- Location: Lexington, Kentucky
- Built: 1874
- Architect: George W. Ranck, Muldoon Monument Company, Louisville
- MPS: Civil War Monuments of Kentucky MPS
- NRHP reference No.: 97000706
- Added to NRHP: July 17, 1997

The Ladies' Confederate Memorial is an American Civil War monument erected in 1874 in Lexington Cemetery in Lexington, Kentucky. It was placed on the National Register of Historic Places on July 17, 1997, as part of the Civil War Monuments of Kentucky MPS. Unlike most Confederate monuments in Kentucky, it represents grief rather than Southern patriotism.

== Fund raising ==
The Ladies Memorial and Monument Association was founded by Mary Cyrene Burch Breckinridge, the wife of John C. Breckinridge, on May 26, 1869, after she saw the unveiling of the Confederate Monument in Cynthiana, Kentucky. After six years of fund raising the memorial was dedicated on May 26, 1875.

== Description ==
The statue features a marble cross shaped as if made of logs. A broken sword and broken flagstaff are among the motifs, which also include lilies. Rugged rocks are the motif for the limestone pedestal. It was designed by George W. Ranck (1841–1901), a Lexington historian, and paid for by the Ladies Memorial and Monument Association of Lexington. The cross was made in Italy, with the pedestal supplied by Louisville's Muldoon Monument Company. It was called "probably the most perfect thing of its kind in the South" by Frank Leslie's Illustrated Newspaper.

== Inspiration ==
It is believed that the memorial might have been inspired by a poem written by Abram Joseph Ryan, a Confederate chaplain:

Take that banner down! 'tis tattered;

Broken is its staff and shattered,
And the valiant hosts are scattered

Over whom it floated high.

The Confederate Soldier Monument in Lexington is a few feet away, and was also part of the Civil War Monuments of Kentucky MPS.

== Gallery ==
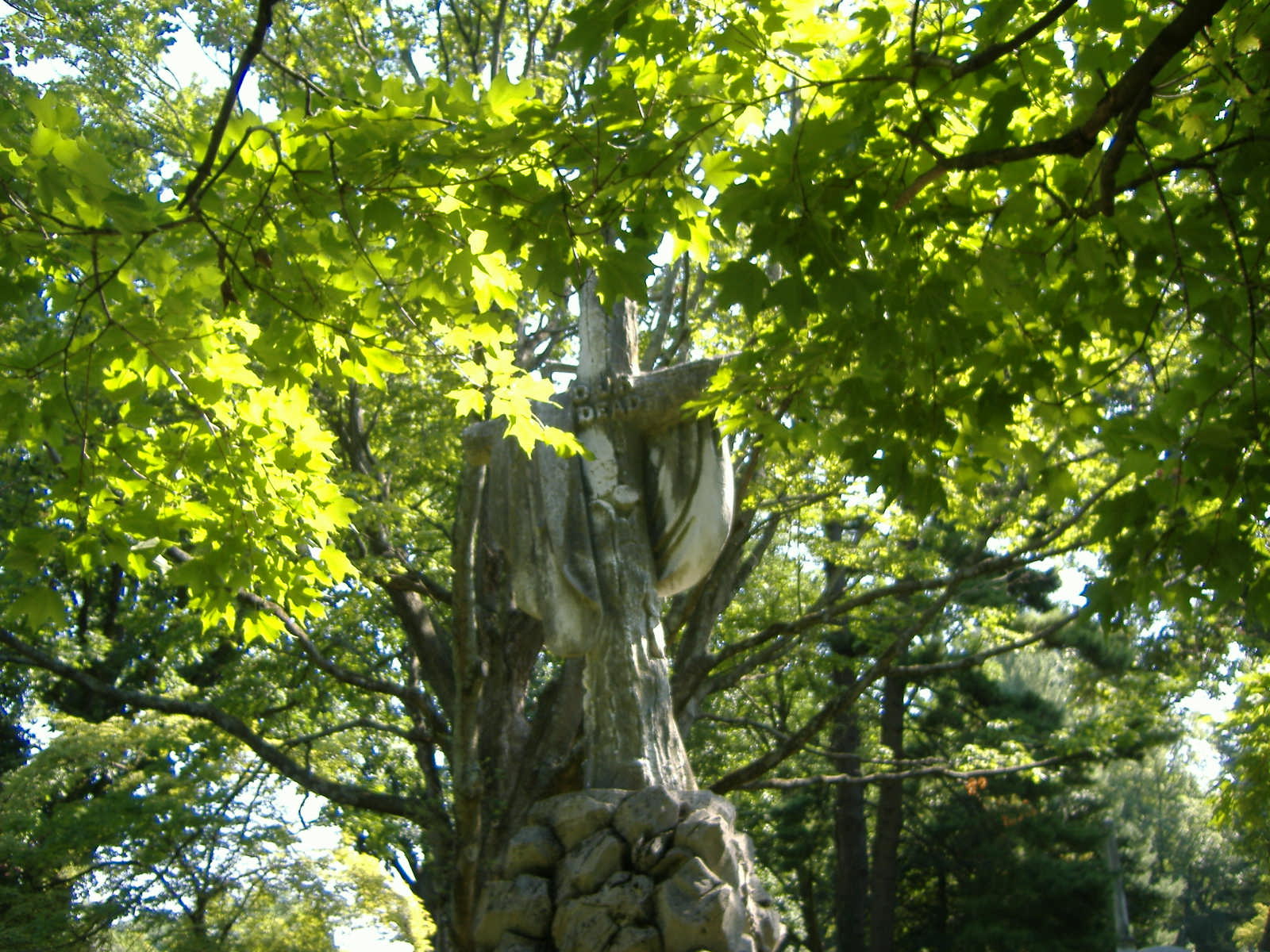
Closeup

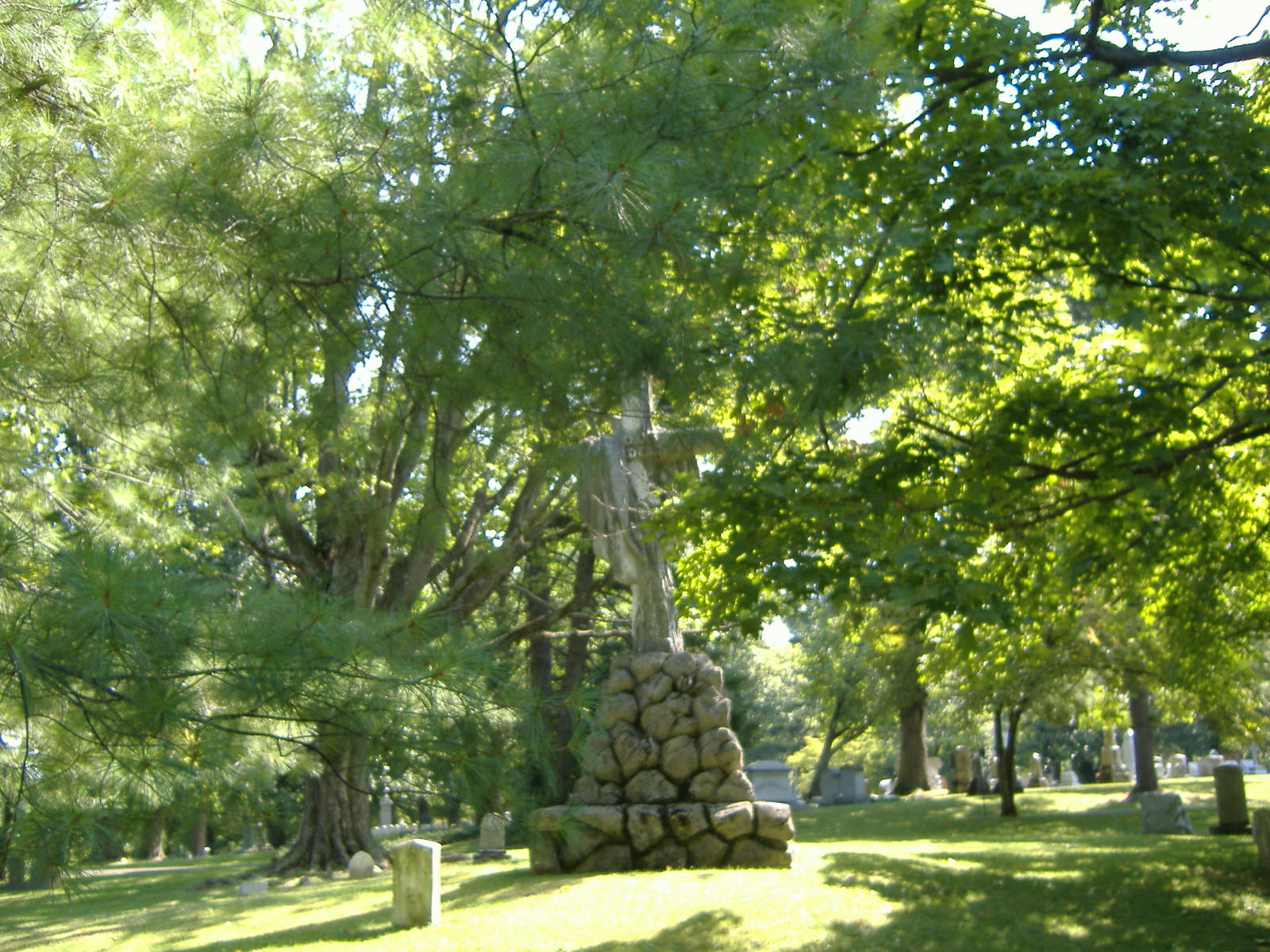

== See also ==
Ladies' Memorial Association
