= National Register of Historic Places listings in Graves County, Kentucky =

Location of Graves County in Kentucky

This is a list of the National Register of Historic Places listings in Graves County, Kentucky.

It is intended to be a complete list of the properties and districts on the National Register of Historic Places in Graves County, Kentucky, United States. The locations of National Register properties and districts for which the latitude and longitude coordinates are included below, may be seen in a map.

There are 11 properties and districts listed on the National Register in the county.

This National Park Service list is complete through NPS recent listings posted March 21, 2025.

== Current listings ==
	Name on the Register	Image	Date listed	Location	City or town	Description
1	Camp Beauregard Memorial in Water Valley	Camp Beauregard Memorial in Water Valley	July 17, 1997 (#97000698)	Camp Beauregard Cemetery, 0.5 miles south of the junction of Roy Lawrence and Cuba Rds. 36°34′22″N 88°47′36″W	Water Valley	
2	Confederate Memorial Gates in Mayfield	Confederate Memorial Gates in Mayfield	July 17, 1997 (#97000696)	Maplewood Cemetery, 1 block south of the junction of Kentucky Routes 80 and 121; 36°44′56″N 88°38′04″W	Mayfield	
3	Confederate Memorial in Mayfield	Confederate Memorial in Mayfield	July 17, 1997 (#97000697)	2 blocks north of the junction of 5th and Lee Sts. 36°44′29″N 88°38′07″W	Mayfield	
4	Pete Lyles House	Pete Lyles House	December 26, 2006 (#06001202)	302 Kentucky Route 348, E. 36°55′07″N 88°30′54″W	Symsonia	
5	Mayfield Downtown Commercial District	Mayfield Downtown Commercial District	August 16, 1984 (#84001477)	Roughly bounded by North, Water, 5th, and 9th Sts.; also roughly bounded by N. 9th, W. and E. North, N. and S. 5th, E. Water, and S. and N. 8th Sts. 36°44′28″N 88°38′09″W	Mayfield	Second set of streets represents a boundary increase. Many of the buildings in the district, including the courthouse, suffered major to catastrophic damage on December 10–11, 2021, as a long-track EF4 tornado directly hit the city.
6	Mayfield Electric and Water Systems	Mayfield Electric and Water Systems	August 18, 2011 (#11000536)	301 E. Broadway; 36°44′31″N 88°38′03″W	Mayfield	Destroyed by a long-track EF4 tornado on December 10, 2021.
7	Meacham Manor		December 31, 1974 (#74000877)	7 miles east of Fulton off Kentucky Route 116; 36°30′20″N 88°43′33″W	Fulton	
8	St. Jerome's Catholic Church Complex	St. Jerome's Catholic Church Complex	January 8, 2014 (#13001052)	20 Kentucky Route 339 and 10225 Kentucky Route 80 W. 36°47′58″N 88°47′27″W	Fancy Farm	
9	U.S. Post Office	U.S. Post Office	December 2, 1982 (#82001566)	9th St. and Broadway; 36°44′31″N 88°38′18″W	Mayfield	Destroyed by a long-track EF4 tornado on December 10, 2021.
10	Wooldridge Monuments	Wooldridge Monuments	August 11, 1980 (#80001533)	Maplewood Cemetery; 36°44′58″N 88°38′12″W	Mayfield	
11	Youngblood Site (15GV26)		April 4, 1986 (#86000694)	Address Restricted	Hicksville	

== See also ==
- List of National Historic Landmarks in Kentucky
- National Register of Historic Places listings in Kentucky
