= Confederate Monument (Murray, Kentucky) =

- Confederate Monument in Murray
- U.S. National Register of Historic Places
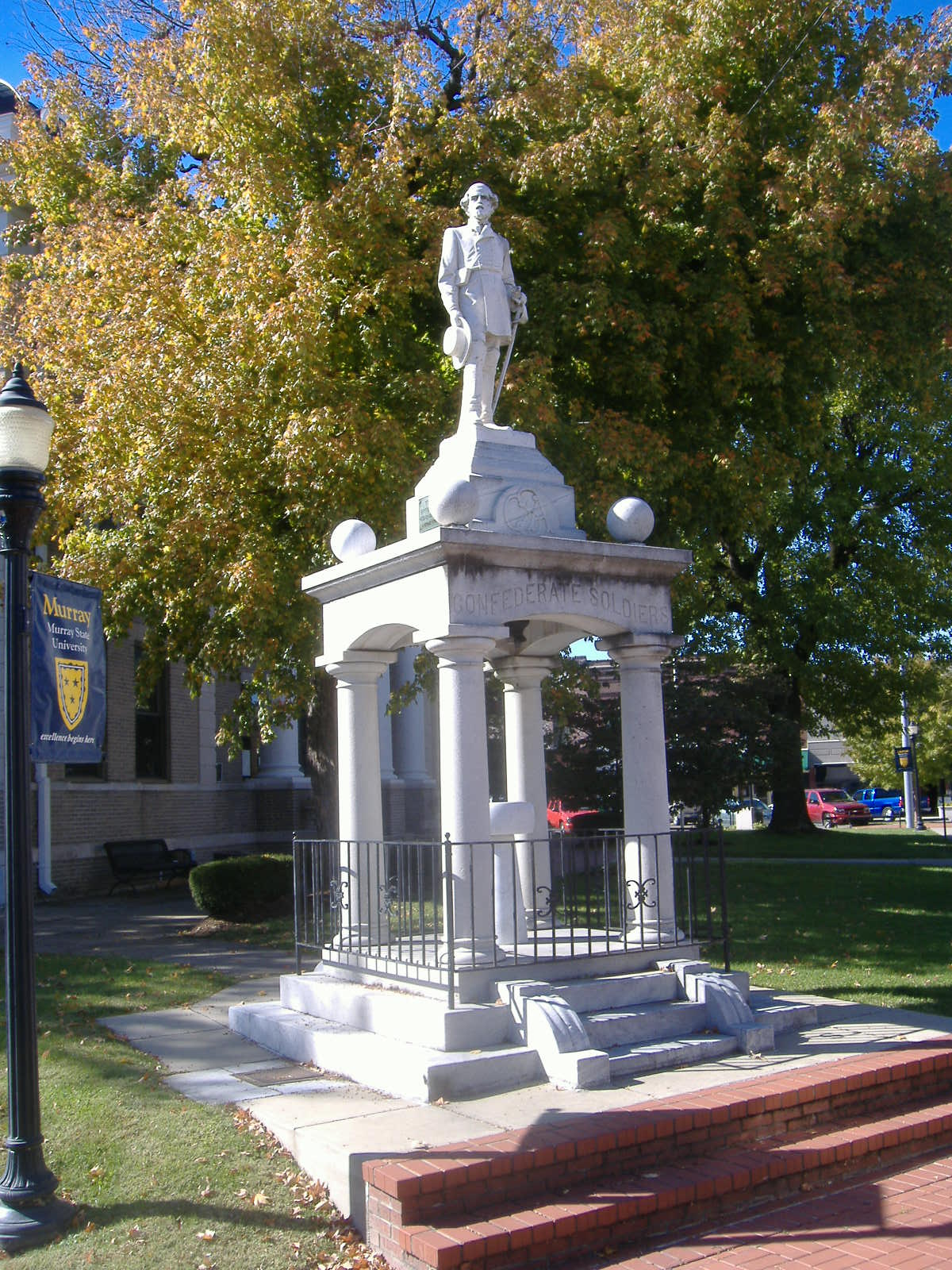

- Location within Kentucky Location within the United States
- Location: Jct. of KY 94 and Ky 121, Murray, Kentucky
- Built: 1917
- Architect: McNeel Marble Company, Marietta, GA
- MPS: Civil War Monuments of Kentucky MPS
- NRHP reference No.: 97000711
- Added to NRHP: July 17, 1997

The Confederate Monument in Murray is a statue located in the northeast corner of the Calloway County Courthouse in Murray, Kentucky. It commemorates the 800 citizens of the county who served in the Confederate Army during the American Civil War, and is one of several Confederate monuments in Kentucky featuring Robert E. Lee. There is another one featuring Lee in Bardstown, Kentucky. Despite recent controversy, the Calloway County Fiscal Court voted to keep the statue on its grounds in July 2020.

== Establishment ==
During the American Civil War, Calloway County saw about 800 of its citizens serve in the Confederate Army. 200 plus served in the Union Army. At the time of the Civil War 1,500 enslaved people were living in Calloway County making up about 15% of the county's population at the time.

The monument was funded after a three-year fund raising drive by the J. N. Williams Chapter of the United Daughters of the Confederacy (U.D.C.) in 1917, whose chairman died during that period; her name was added to the monument in tribute. The U.D.C. paid $2,500 to Marietta, Georgia's McNeel Marble Company for the structure.

== Structure ==
The 16.5-foot-tall (5.0 m) monument has three parts. The bottom is a porcelain drinking fountain; It was a working fountain, a step pedal was used to obtain water. In its time, was the most elaborate and modern of the Civil War fountain monuments: the other three fountains are the Confederate Memorial in Mayfield, Confederate Memorial Fountain in Hopkinsville, and the Confederate Monument of Cadiz.

Four 6-foot-tall (1.8 m) Doric columns support a granite canopy. Inside the canopy is an ornate iron light fixture with four incandescent bulbs to light the fountain. On top are four marble balls and a 5.5-foot-tall (1.7 m) marble statue of Lee, making it the only monument in Kentucky that heavily features Robert E. Lee; the only other monument in Kentucky with a likeness of Lee is Bardstown, Kentucky's Confederate Monument of Bardstown which has only a small relief portrait of Lee below the large statue of a Confederate soldier.

On July 17, 1997, the Confederate Monument in Murray was one of sixty-one different monuments related to the Civil War in Kentucky placed on the National Register of Historic Places, as part of the Civil War Monuments of Kentucky Multiple Property Submission.

== Controversy ==
=== Call for removal ===
In the wake of the George Floyd protests in June 2020, a call to remove the statue was initially made by Sherman Neal II, a football coach at Murray State University, in a letter to Murray Mayor Bob Rogers and other local officials. When asked about the statue, Governor of Kentucky Andy Beshear said, "If it is at a courthouse, it ought to come down. Having a confederate monument on courthouse grounds or in the rotunda is not the right thing." A number of other prominent local organizations and individuals called for Calloway Court to remove the statue including a unanimous resolution by the Murray City Council, Murray State University, Murray Main Street Board of Directors, and Ja Morant, among others.

=== Official response ===
In response to the June 2020 calls for removal, the Mayor of Murray, Bob Rogers, released a statement that the statue was situated on land owned by Calloway County and therefore the City of Murray had no jurisdiction which was confirmed by Judge/Executive of the Calloway County Fiscal Court, Kenny Imes. In its June 2020 meeting, Calloway Court updated its rules as a result of COVID-19 to limit the number of speakers discussing this issue which included Mr. Neal, but afterwards made no decision about whether to keep or remove the statue citing unclear ownership issues. During the July 2020 meeting of the Calloway Court, a proposal was heard from Kevin Elliott of the Murray State University Political Science Department to move the statue to the nearby Confederate cemetery, however, the Court instead unanimously voted to keep the statue where it was located. In a resolution drafted by Calloway County Attorney Bryan Ernstberger, one of the justifications was a claim of statue ownership by the U.D.C. which Ernstberger indicated the Court could not dispute based on minutes from 1916 Calloway Court meeting as indicating the U.D.C. "may be granted the privilege of erecting a monument" on Courthouse grounds. The minutes from the 1916 Calloway Court meeting also indicate "the location shall be by and with the approval of the Fiscal Court." Although not part of the resolution, a voting magistrate of the Calloway Court, Paul Rister, indicated he was basing his vote on a survey where he drove around his district and asked people who were outside their homes their thoughts on the statue resulting in 77% asking for the monument to stay and 23% asking for it to be moved out of a reported 280 surveyed.

=== Protests and escalation ===
In the two months following the June 2020 calls for removal, a number of protests took place in Murray and Calloway County related to this statue, the murder of George Floyd, and police brutality nationwide. In June 2020, an arrest was made of a man at a parade away from the monument for allegedly pointing a gun at protesters from his vehicle. Another arrest was made of a man at the same parade who allegedly rolled down his window and sprayed pepper spray on multiple protesters and five police officers. According to police, the suspect then attempted to drive through the crowd of protesters and officers before being stopped by police.

Following the Calloway Court's July 2020 vote to keep the statue on its grounds, a series of protests were held at the statue including both protesters and counter-protesters of the Court's decision. In August 2020, a man opposed to removal of the statue approached protestors and sprayed the protesters and the sidewalk with a water hose. Charges have been filed against one of the protestors who was sprayed, rather than the person spraying the hose, for allegedly falsifying a police report regarding the incident which is on video. County Attorney Ernstberger, who wrote the resolution to keep the statue, was also serving as the prosecutor in this case. The charges were later dropped.

In early February 2021, an opponent to removal allegedly brandished a gun from their vehicle towards a group protesting the statue including college students from Murray State University and young children with their parents with no known arrests made. In December 2021, the Confederate monument was splashed with red paint.

In January 2022, Ernstberger faced a challenger in his re-election for County Attorney. The challenger Madison Leach made the removal of the monument one of the points of her platform and proposed a legal theory that because "the Daughters of the Confederacy owns this monument, and the Sons of the Confederacy seem to be the one that’s taking care of it now – that means that the government has opened this up as a venue for speaking because (the monument) is obviously a type of speech. That means that they can’t get involved with viewpoint discrimination." Ernstberger was reelected by a ~13% margin, or 45 votes.

== In media ==
Several films were made about the community effort to remove the Confederate Monument.

- "Ghosts of a Lost Cause" sponsored by the Kentucky Rural-Urban Exchange
- "Friendliest Small Town in America" sponsored by the Pulitzer Center

== Gallery ==
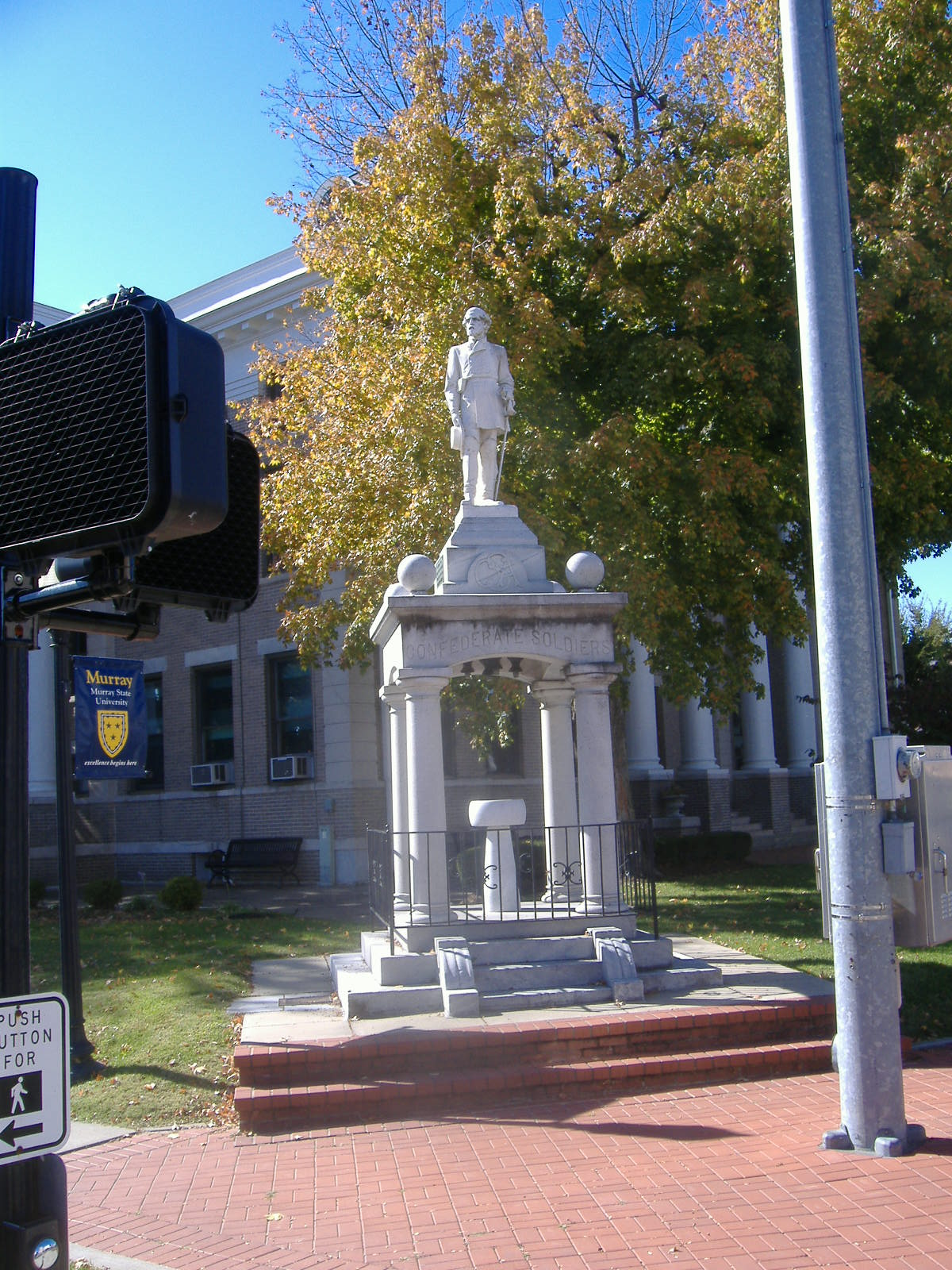
Front view

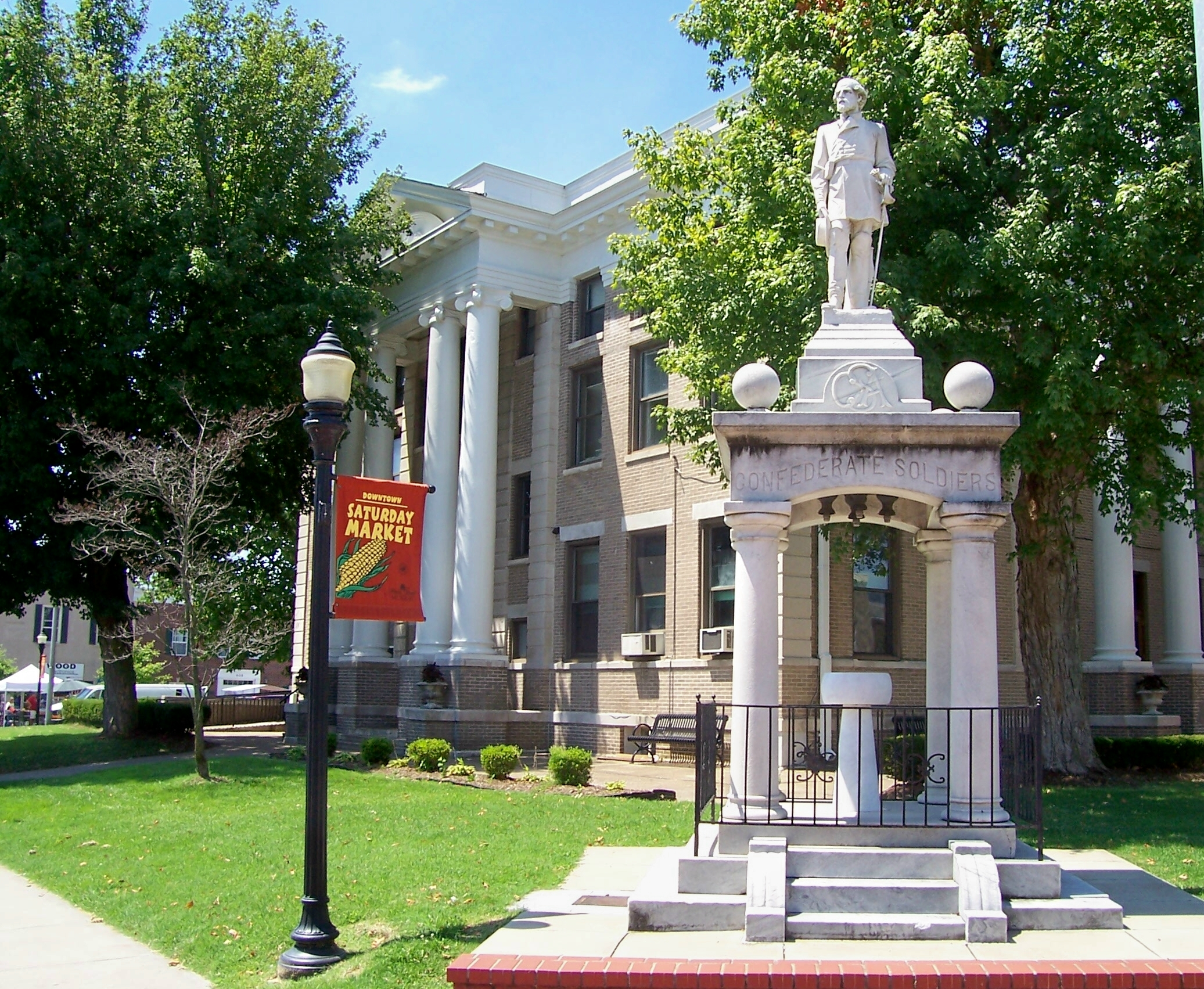
Monument with courthouse in view
