= Camp Beauregard Memorial =

- U.S. National Register of Historic Places
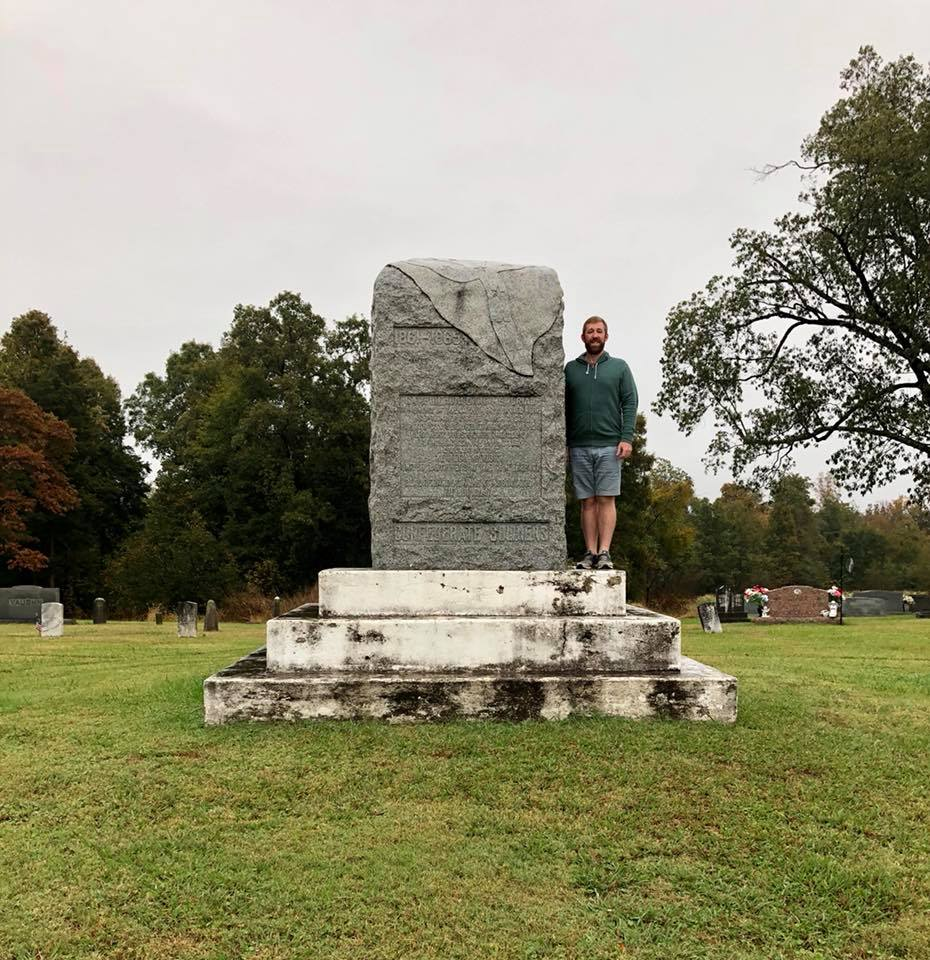

- Location within Kentucky Location within the United States
- Nearest city: Water Valley, Kentucky
- Built: 1920
- MPS: Civil War Monuments of Kentucky MPS
- NRHP reference No.: 97000698
- Added to NRHP: July 17, 1997

The Camp Beauregard Memorial, outside Water Valley, Kentucky on Kentucky state road 2422 northeast of town, marks the site of a Confederate States Army encampment named for General P. G. T. Beauregard. The camp was situated to protect the right flank of the Confederate encampment at Columbus, Kentucky.

== Background ==
While an active military installation, from September 1861 to March 1, 1862, it trained 5,000-6,000 soldiers for the Confederacy. However, the place was disease-ridden, resulting in 1,000-1,500 deaths at the camp. The diseases included cerebrospinal meningitis, pneumonia, and typhoid fever with poor weather and lack of sufficient supplies for the troops contributing to the dire situation. In a single day 75 cases of typhoid and pneumonia were reported. Under the direction of the 7th Tennessee Cavalry Regiment's Lieutenant-Colonel Thomas H. Logwood, it was destroyed. United States forces occupied the abandoned camp shortly thereafter.

== History ==
In 1909, the Kentucky Division of the United Daughters of the Confederacy placed a small monument dedicated to the dead soldiers at the cemetery site entrance, and then, on October 20, 1920, an eleven-foot monument within the cemetery. A concrete base was added in 1930. There were plans for a larger Civil War monument, but they never materialized.

The surrounding cemetery is believed by some to be haunted. On July 17, 1997, Camp Beauregard Memorial was one of sixty different monuments related to the American Civil War in Kentucky placed on the National Register of Historic Places, as part of the Civil War Monuments of Kentucky Multiple Property Submission. Two other monuments on the list are in Graves County, both in Mayfield: the Confederate Memorial in Mayfield and the Confederate Memorial Gates in Mayfield.
