= Latham Confederate Monument =

Historic place in Hopkinsville, Kentucky

- U.S. National Register of Historic Places
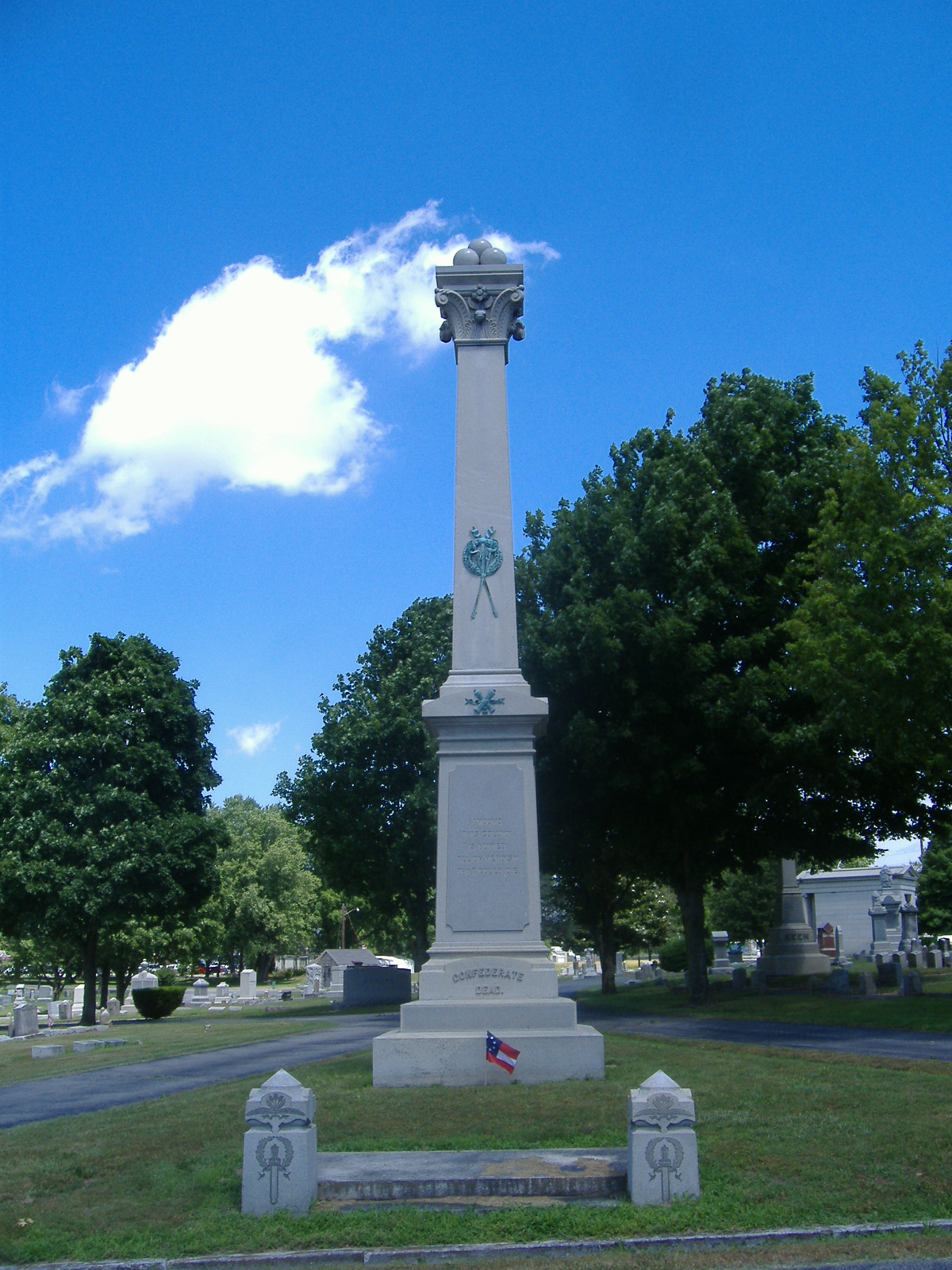

- Location within Kentucky Location within the United States
- Location: Hopkinsville, Kentucky
- Built: 1887
- Architects: Hollowell Granite Company, Bangor, ME
- MPS: Civil War Monuments of Kentucky
- NRHP reference No.: 97000709
- Added to NRHP: July 17, 1997

The Latham Confederate Monument in Hopkinsville, Kentucky's Riverside Cemetery, is a monument on the National Register of Historic Places.

A native of Hopkinsville then living in New York City, John C. Latham, desired that deceased veterans on both sides in Hopkinsville be buried together. Latham was a millionaire in the cotton business, who fought for the Confederate States of America during the conflict. However, most of the Union veterans had already been buried at the Fort Donelson National Cemetery, so instead the mass burial would involve only Confederate veterans, 101 in total, that were scattered at various burial locations. Latham gave $14,000 to the city of Hopkinsville for the project. The dedication of the monument and the accompanying graves was on May 19, 1887, with a book, The Story of a Monument, was published by Dennison & Brown in 1888 with notes about the monument and its dedication. Latham would also donate $50,000 for the construction of turnpikes.

Latham had Hallowell Granite Works, a company based in Bangor, Maine, build the monument. The monument is made of granite and is 37 feet tall. The monument has several decorations: 18-inch-diameter (460 mm) cannonballs, Laurel wreaths, bronze cannons, and two swords.

On July 17, 1997, the Latham Confederate Monument was one of sixty different monuments related to the Civil War in Kentucky placed on the National Register of Historic Places, as part of the Civil War Monuments of Kentucky Multiple Property Submission. The Confederate Memorial Fountain in Hopkinsville is also in Hopkinsville; it is located by the Christian County Courthouse in downtown Hopkinsville.
