= Confederate Memorial Fountain in Hopkinsville =

- U.S. National Register of Historic Places
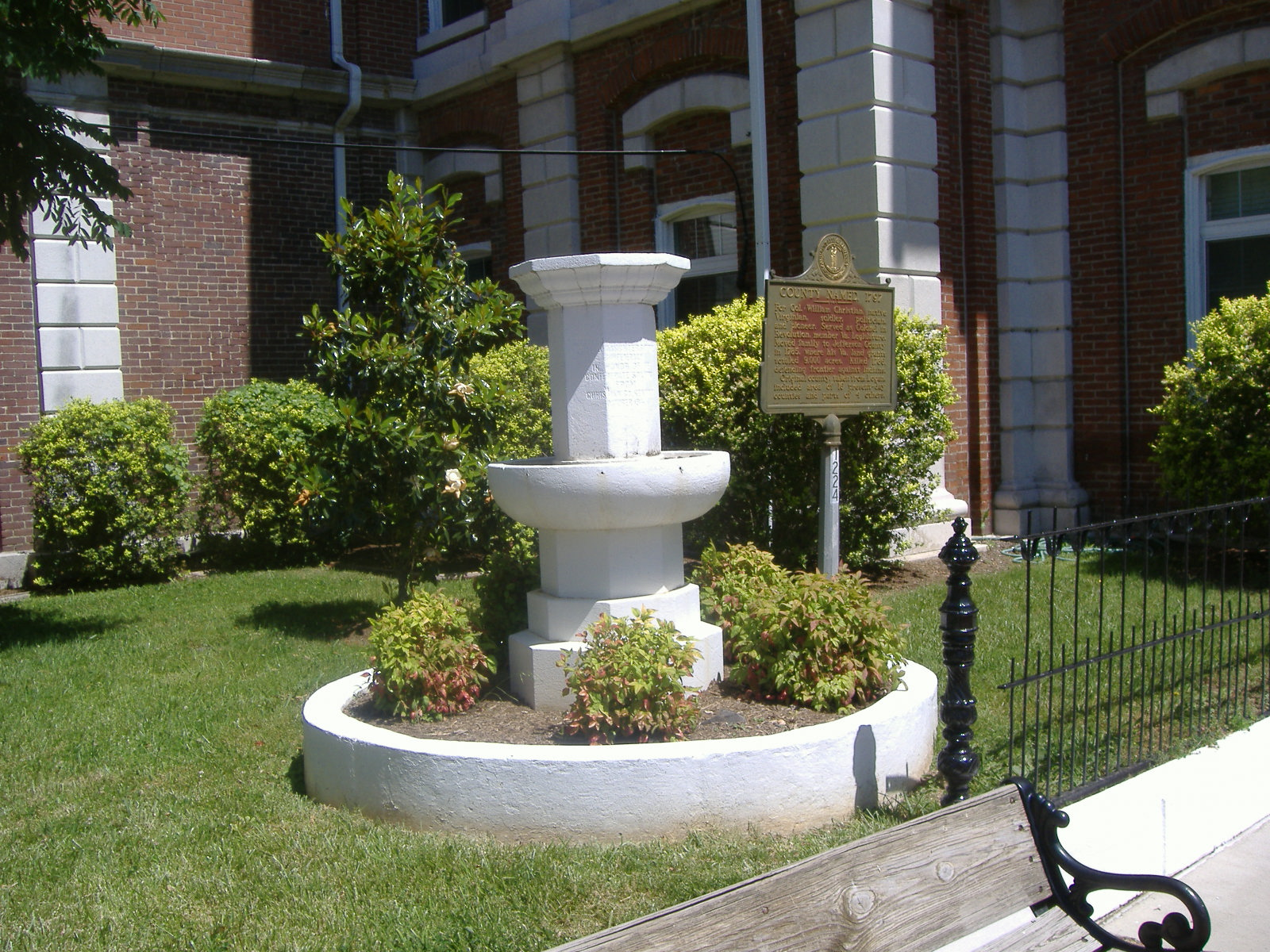

- Location within Kentucky Location within the United States
- Location: Hopkinsville, Kentucky
- Built: 1911
- Architect: Davis Monument Co., Hopkinsville, KY
- MPS: Civil War Monuments of Kentucky MPS
- NRHP reference No.: 97000710
- Added to NRHP: July 17, 1997

The Confederate Memorial Fountain in Hopkinsville, Kentucky is a monument dedicated in October 1911. It is on the National Register of Historic Places.

During the war, Nathan Bedford Forrest made his winter headquarters at Hopkinsville in 1861–1862. On December 12, 1864, Confederate General Hylan B. Lyon burned the county courthouse at Hopkinsville, but the records survived.

The memorial fountain, eight feet tall and made of white marble, was built after the local chapter of the United Daughters of the Confederacy spent five years raising the funds to erect it. It was initially located at the corner of 9th Street and Main Street, but was later moved to the front of the Christian County Courthouse. It was built as a public drinking fountain, but the mechanism no longer works.

On July 17, 1997, the Confederate Memorial Fountain in Hopkinsville was one of sixty different monuments related to the Civil War in Kentucky placed on the National Register of Historic Places, as part of the Civil War Monuments of Kentucky Multiple Property Submission. Three other monuments on this Multiple Property Submission were also fountains: two of these are the Confederate Monument of Cadiz and the Confederate Memorial in Mayfield. Fourteen other monuments were built due to the efforts of the United Daughters of the Confederacy. The Latham Confederate Monument is also in Hopkinsville; it is located at Riverside Cemetery to the north side of town.
