= Confederate Monument of Bardstown =

- U.S. National Register of Historic Places
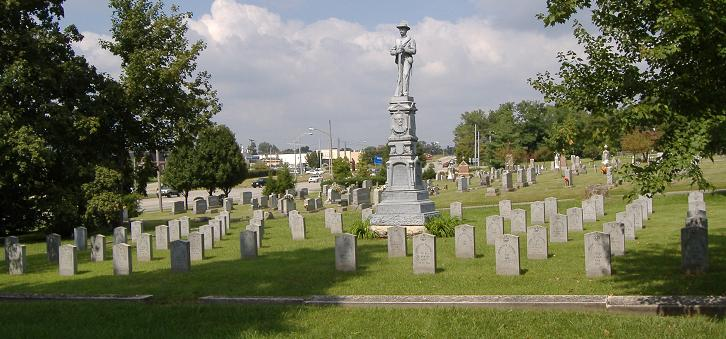
- Location: Bardstown, Kentucky
- Coordinates: 37°49′27.76″N 85°27′41.61″W
- Built: 1903
- MPS: Civil War Monuments of Kentucky MPS
- NRHP reference No.: 97000674
- Added to NRHP: July 17, 1997

The Confederate Monument of Bardstown, in Bardstown, Kentucky was erected in 1903 in the Bardstown St. Joseph's Cemetery to honor the sacrifice of 67 Confederate States Army soldiers, who died during the American Civil War.

== History ==
Most of the Confederate soldiers buried around the Monument were under the command of Major General Braxton Bragg who died in 1862 in conflicts around Bardstown. The bodies were found after the war in a mass grave on common land in Bardstown. Accordingly, $13 were raised by the locals to create a cemetery for them. The Confederate Monument was erected in 1905 after funding from the Memorial Association of Bardstown and a Mrs A. Baldwin whom made up the remainder of the $900 needed for it. After construction, it was handed over to the United Daughters of the Confederacy, whom installed it in Bardstown as a memorial.

The monument was dedicated by the J. Crepps Wickliffe Chapter of the United Daughters of the Confederacy. The base is made of limestone, and the statue of the Confederate soldier was made of zinc. A relief portrait of General Robert E. Lee is located directly beneath the statue.

The inscription reads:

THIS MONUMENT IS ERECTED TO THE MEMORY OF THE 67 BRAVE MEN BURIED HERE, WHO LOST THEIR LIVES IN THE SERVICE OF THE CONFEDERATE GOVERNMENT. ___________

"LORD GOD OF HOSTS BE WITH US YET, LEST WE FORGET, LEST WE FORGET."

MARBLE TELLS NOT OF THEIR VALORS' WORTH, NAMELESS THEY REST IN THE QUIET EARTH.

WE CARE NOT WHENCE THEY CAME, DEAR IN THEIR LIFELESS CLAY; WHETHER UNKNOWN OR KNOWN TO FAME, THEIR CAUSE AND COUNTRY STILL THE SAME, THEY DIED AND WORE THE GRAY.

It was placed on the National Register of Historic Places on July 17, 1997, one of sixty monuments to the American Civil War in Kentucky so honored on the same day. Starting in early autumn of 1999 the Sons of Confederate Veterans, after having laid a wreath at the Confederate Monument the previous year, endeavored to restore and erect the individual gravemarkers. In 2019, the monument and surrounding gravestones were vandalized by orange paint being thrown over them.

== Images ==
Confederate Monument of Bardstown

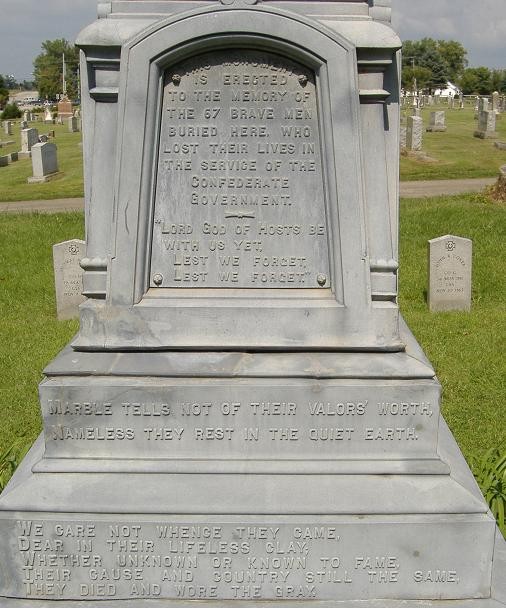
Confederate Monument of Bardstown

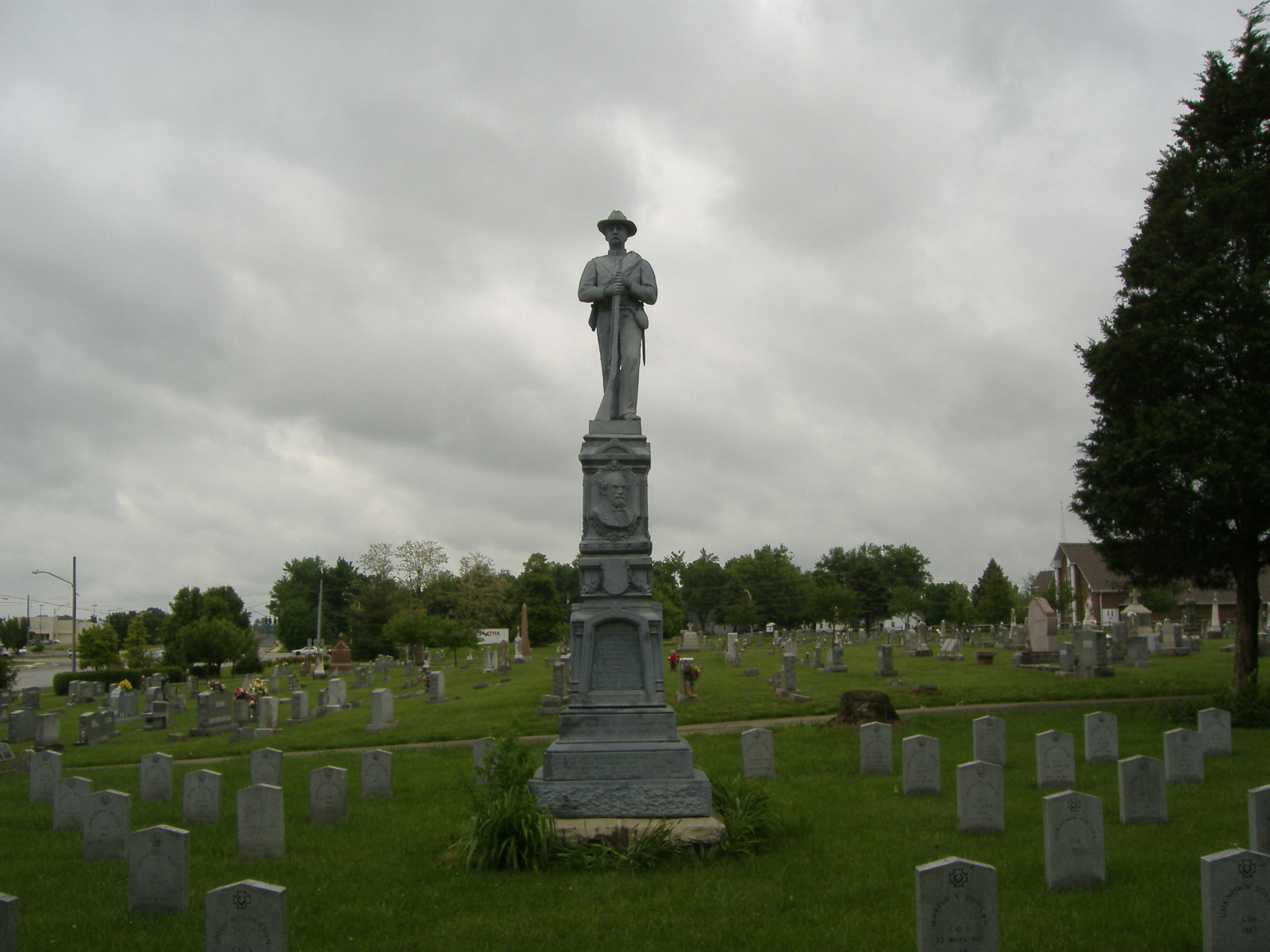
May 2008

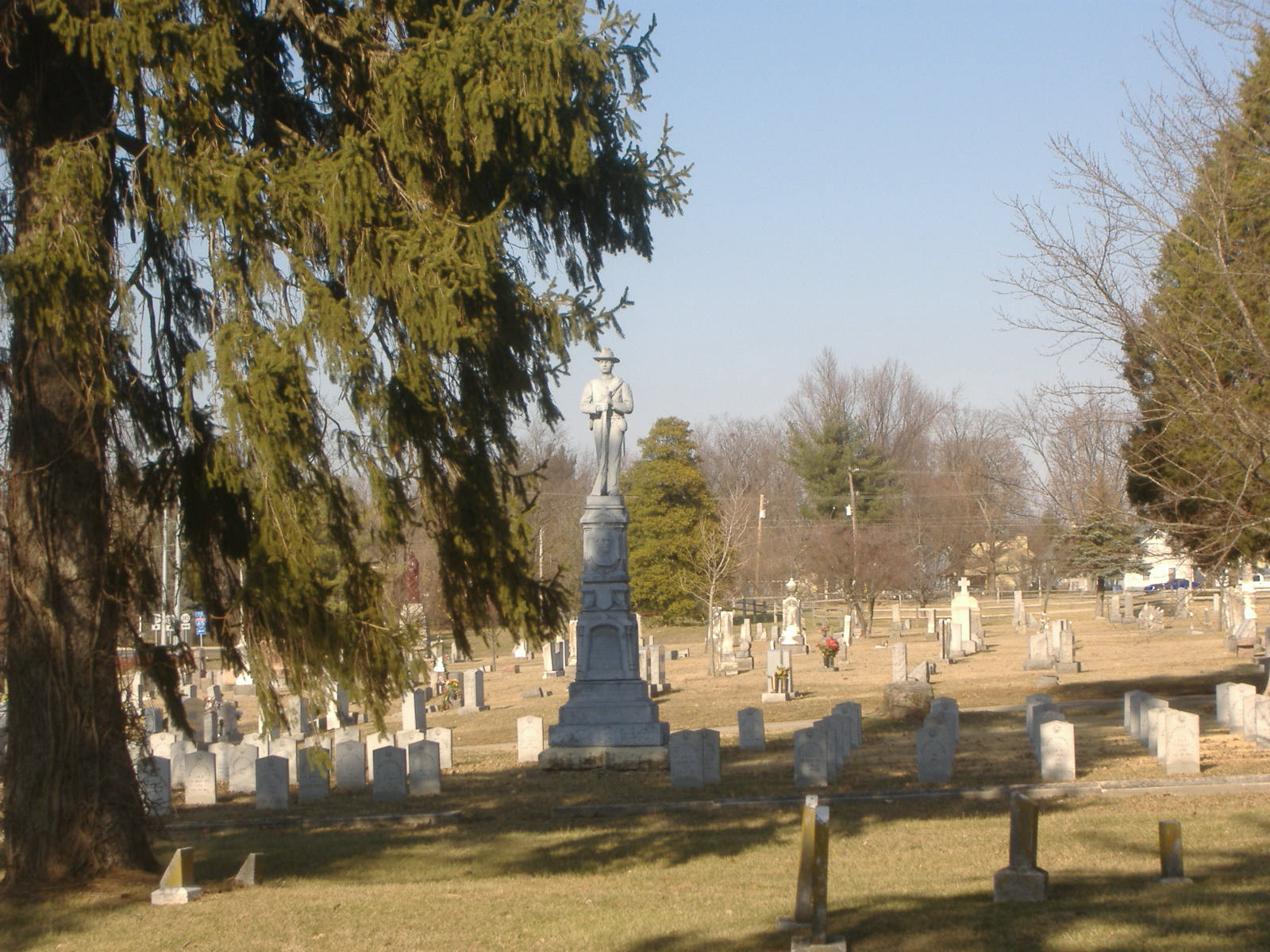
January 2009

== See also ==
- Louisville in the American Civil War
- Kentucky in the American Civil War
