= Wooldridge Monuments =

- U.S. National Register of Historic Places
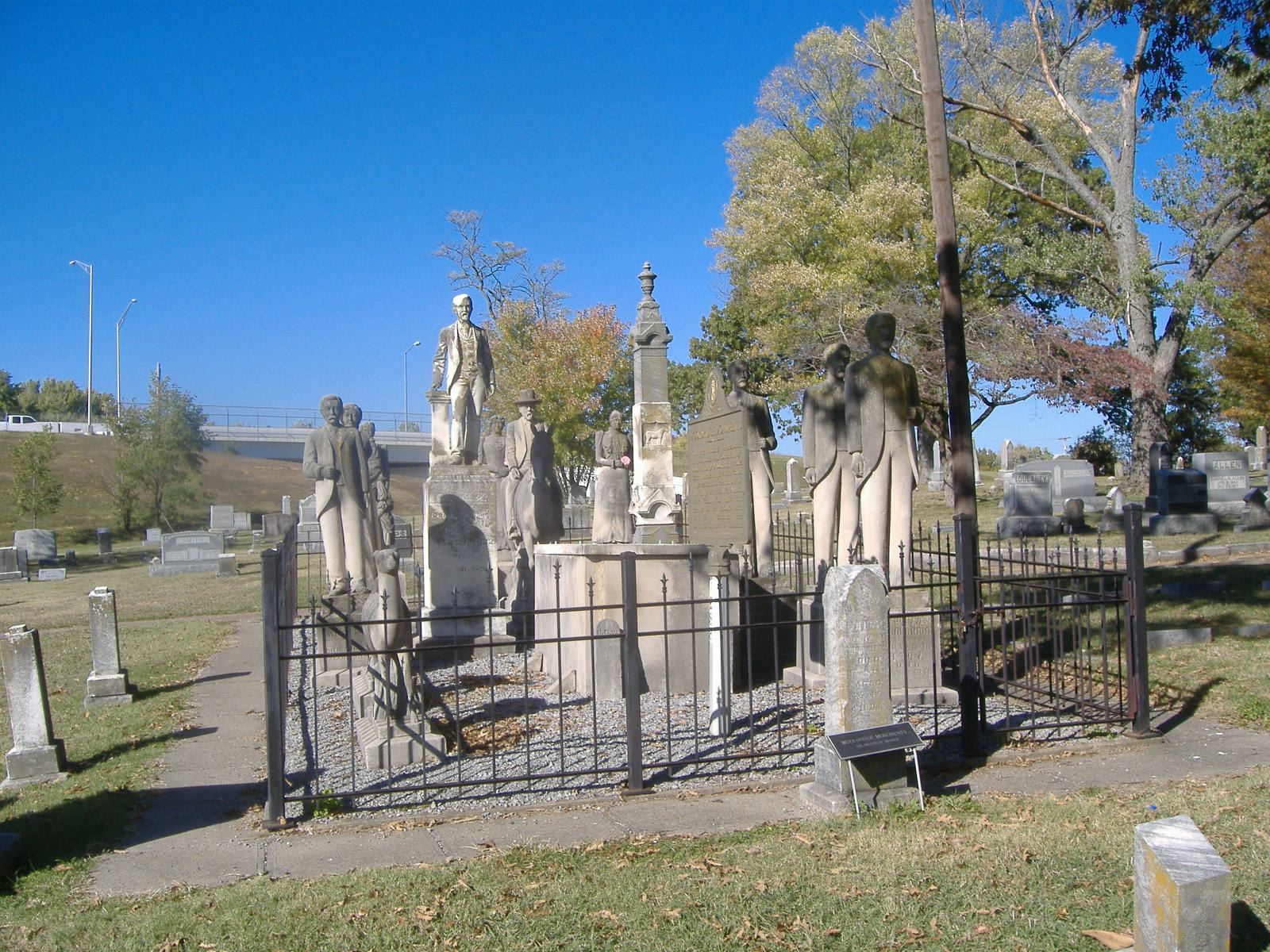

- Location within Kentucky Location within the United States
- Location: Maplewood Cemetery, Mayfield, Kentucky
- Coordinates: 36°44′59″N 88°38′9″W
- Built: 1892
- Architect: Paducah Marble Works; Pryor & Radford Monument Works
- NRHP reference No.: 80001533
- Added to NRHP: August 11, 1980

The Wooldridge Monuments are a series of historical monuments located in Maplewood Cemetery of Mayfield, Kentucky. They were built for Colonel Henry G. Wooldridge, to commemorate family members and other loved ones of his life, from 1892 until Wooldridge's death on May 30, 1899. Wooldridge is the only one buried at the site. The lot has been called "The Strange Procession Which Never Moves".

== History ==
In 1892, Wooldridge lost the last of his sisters, leaving him with no immediate family; he was a lifelong bachelor. This prompted him to buy a lot at Maplewood Cemetery.

The monuments were gaining attention even in Wooldridge's lifetime, as represented in the November 7, 1897 issue of Republic. Stories told of the monuments include the Minnie statue actually representing a childhood sweetheart whose early death due to horse riding prompted Wooldridge's bachelorhood (family records say it was of a niece) and that Wooldridge was such a miser that money was buried with him in his tomb.

== Description ==
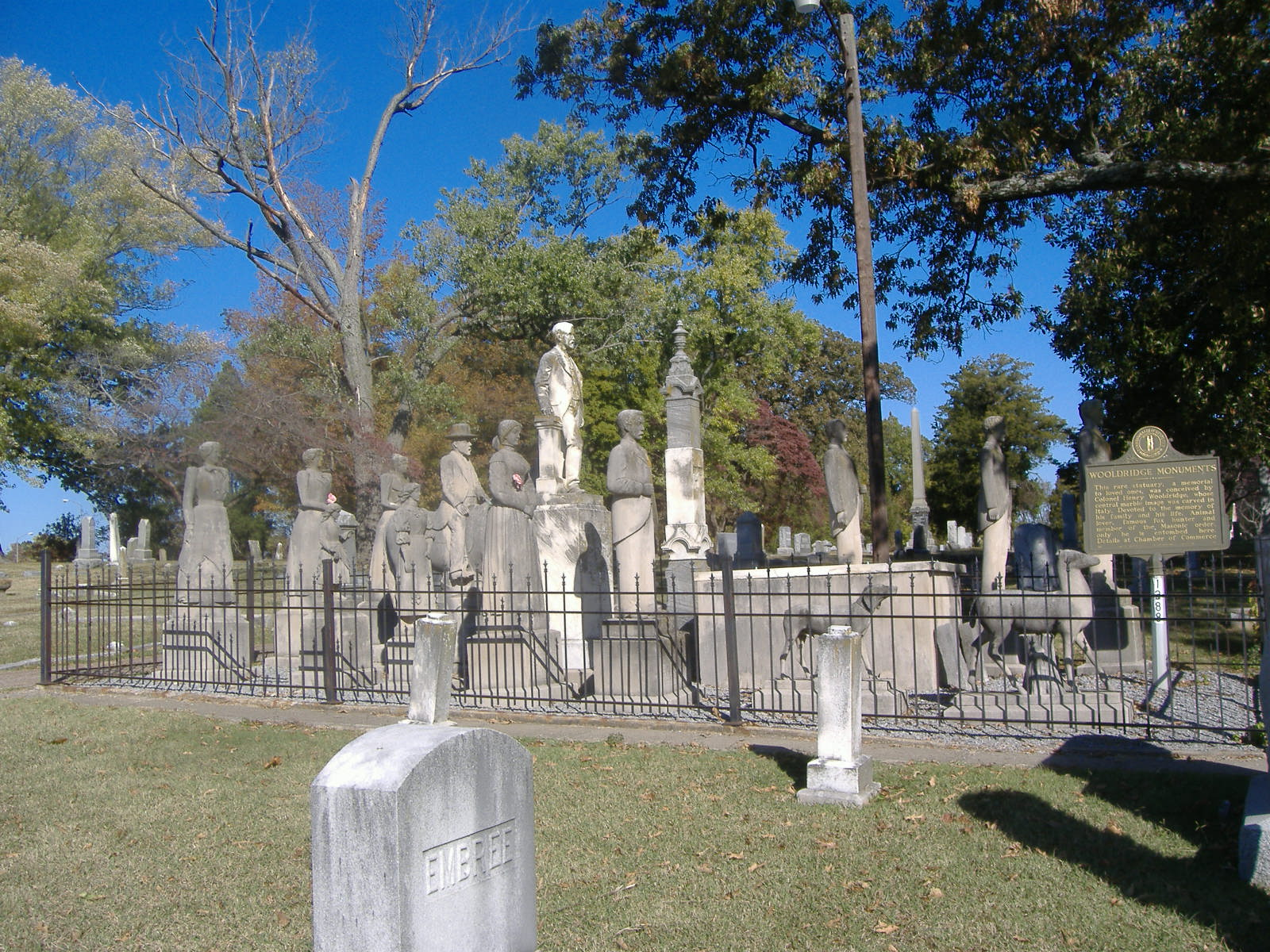
Entrance/South view of the monuments

The total area of the monuments are 17 by 33 feet (5.2 by 10.1 m). All eighteen monuments face east, like most of the gravestones in Maplewood Cemetery. The most prominent is a life-size likeness of Wooldridge himself, a 6-foot-tall (1.8 m) marble statue in the center of the site, made in Italy. Fourteen other monuments surrounding Wooldridge are made of limestone, and have more rigid poses. The largest of these represent Wooldridge on his horse, named "Fop". The other limestone statues are 5 feet (1.5 m) tall on 3-foot-tall (0.91 m) bases, and represent family members. Behind these are replicas of a fox, a deer, and two hounds chasing them; the dogs are unidentified on the statue but represent Wooldridge's dogs "Towhead" and "Bob". The statue makers, who hailed from Mayfield and Paducah, Kentucky, never before or after had a more "complex" or "ambitious" project.

The female statues represent Wooldridge's mother Keziah, his sisters Minerva, Narcissa, and Susan, and his nieces Maud and Minnie. The male statues that are not of Wooldridge are of his brothers Alfred, John, Josiah, and W.H. There is no statue depicting Wooldridge's father.

The fence around the lot was placed there by the Mayfield Masonic lodge, replacing the old iron fence. Wooldridge was a Freemason.

== Modern times ==
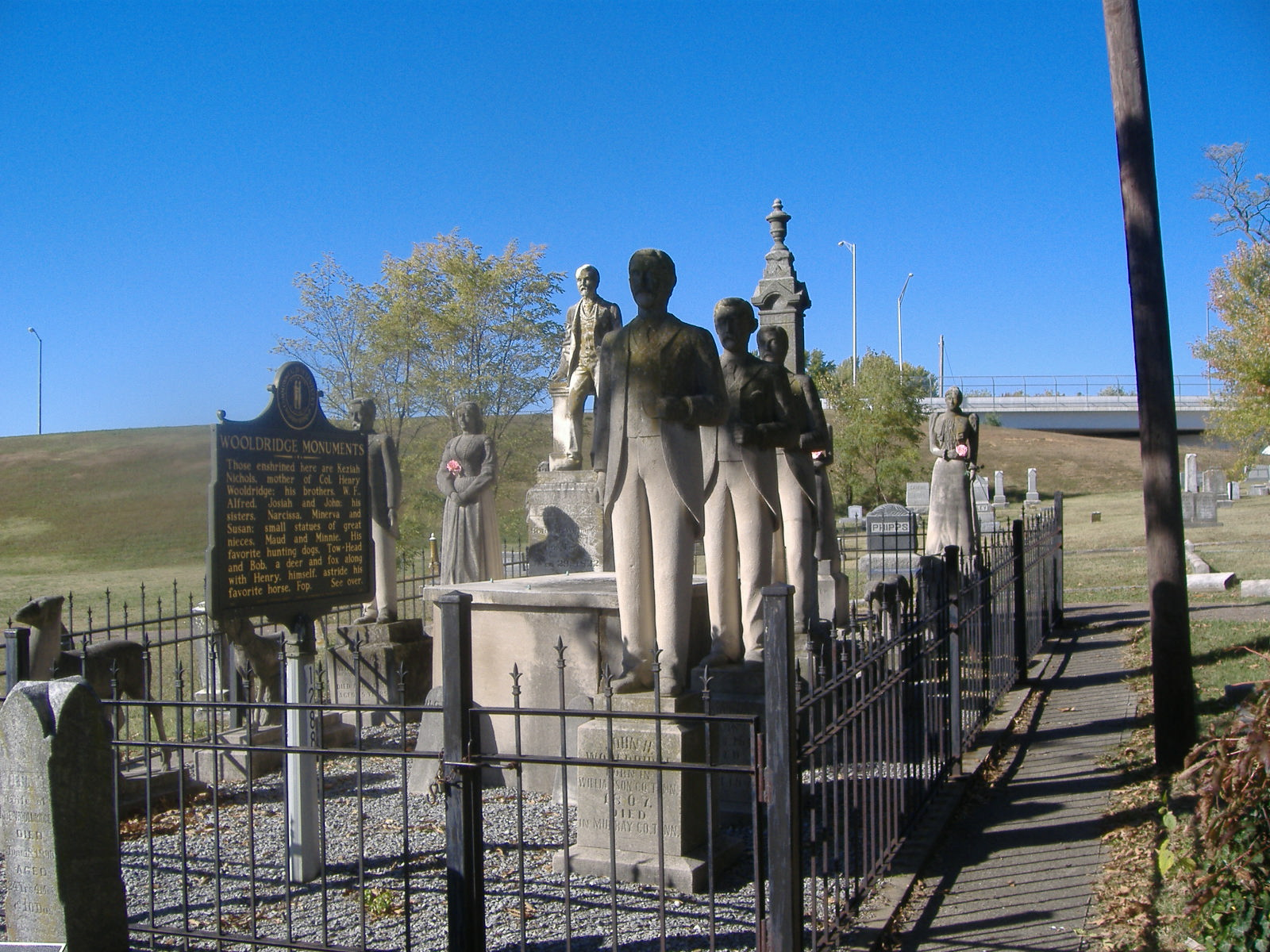
Northeast view, prior to January 2009

In September 1984 the monuments were featured on the TV show Ripley's Believe It or Not.

To gain access to the monuments, one must go through another item on the National Register to get there, the Confederate Memorial Gates in Mayfield.

On January 27, 2009, the monuments were damaged when a large tree in the cemetery fell as a result of an ice storm, breaking several of the heads. Only the statues of Wooldridge's sisters and a dog remained standing. City and County officials considered what to do to repair the damage to the monuments, one of the few tourist attractions for the city.

Over the summer of 2010 all the monuments were restored on site by Monument Conservation Collaborative, a historic monument restoration firm based in Connecticut.

On October 21, 2010, there was an official rededication of the monument as over a year's worth of repairs have been completed and all the statues are back in place.

== Gallery ==
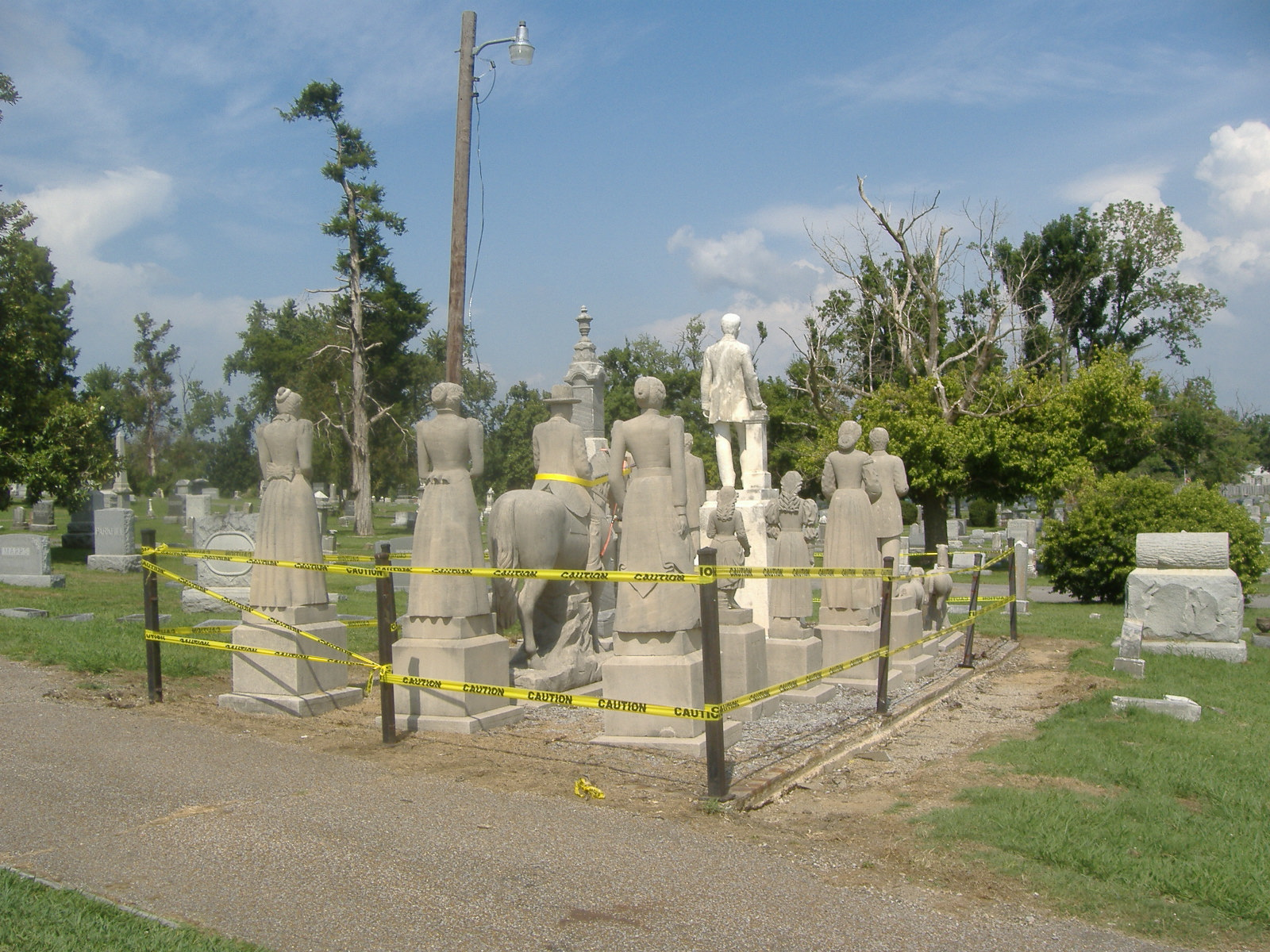
2010 picture of the damage

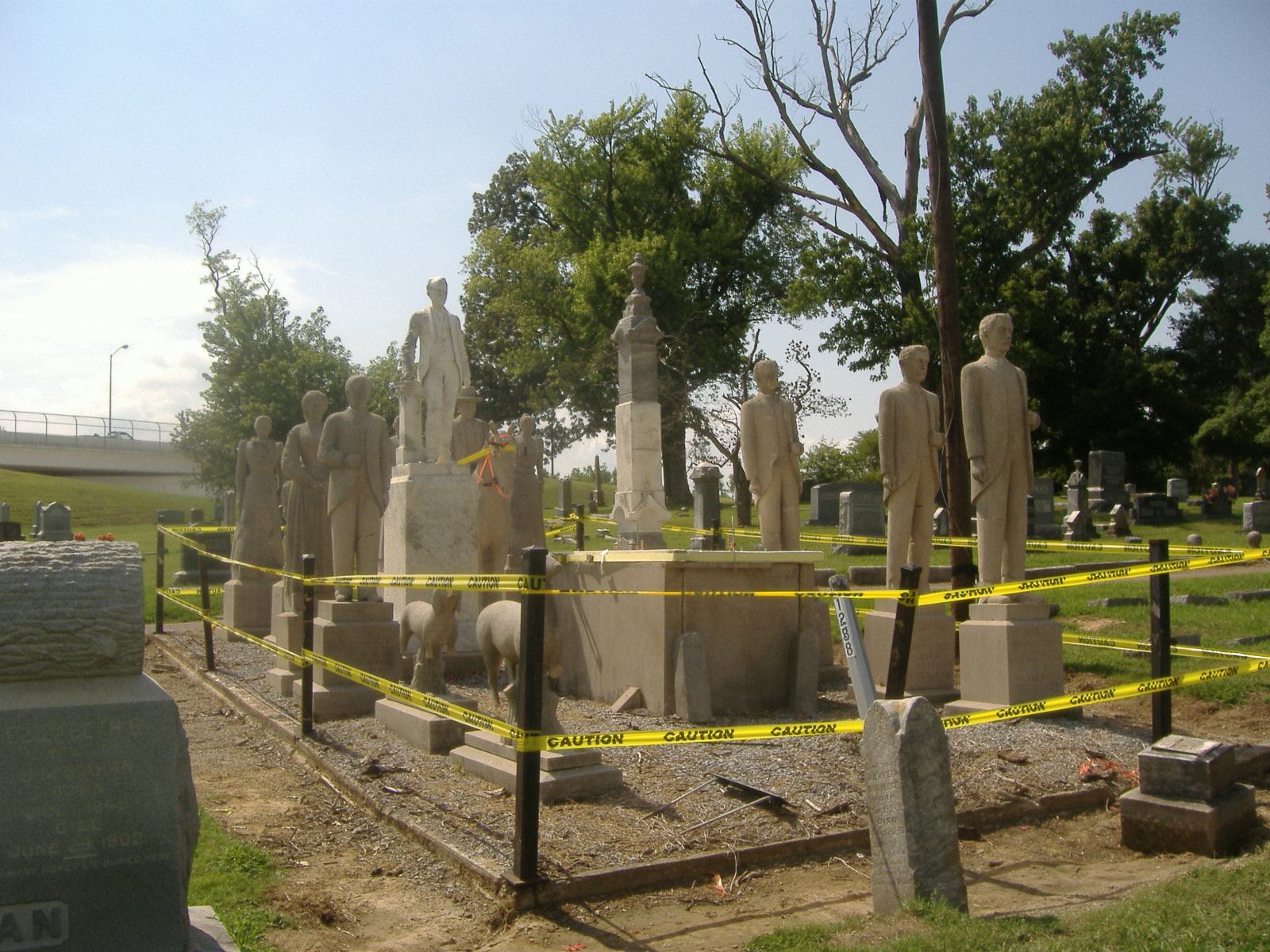
2010 picture of the damage

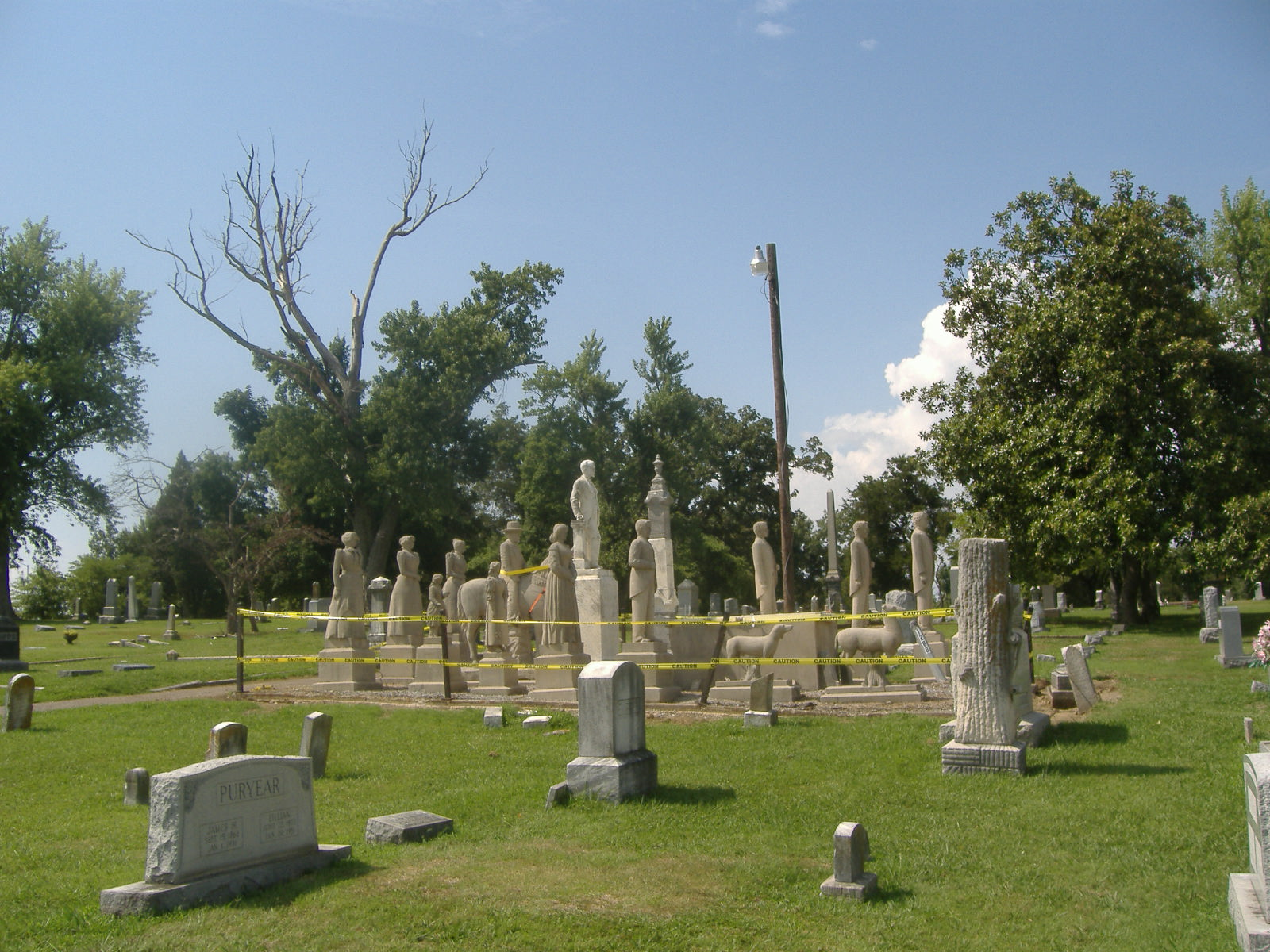
2010 picture of the damage

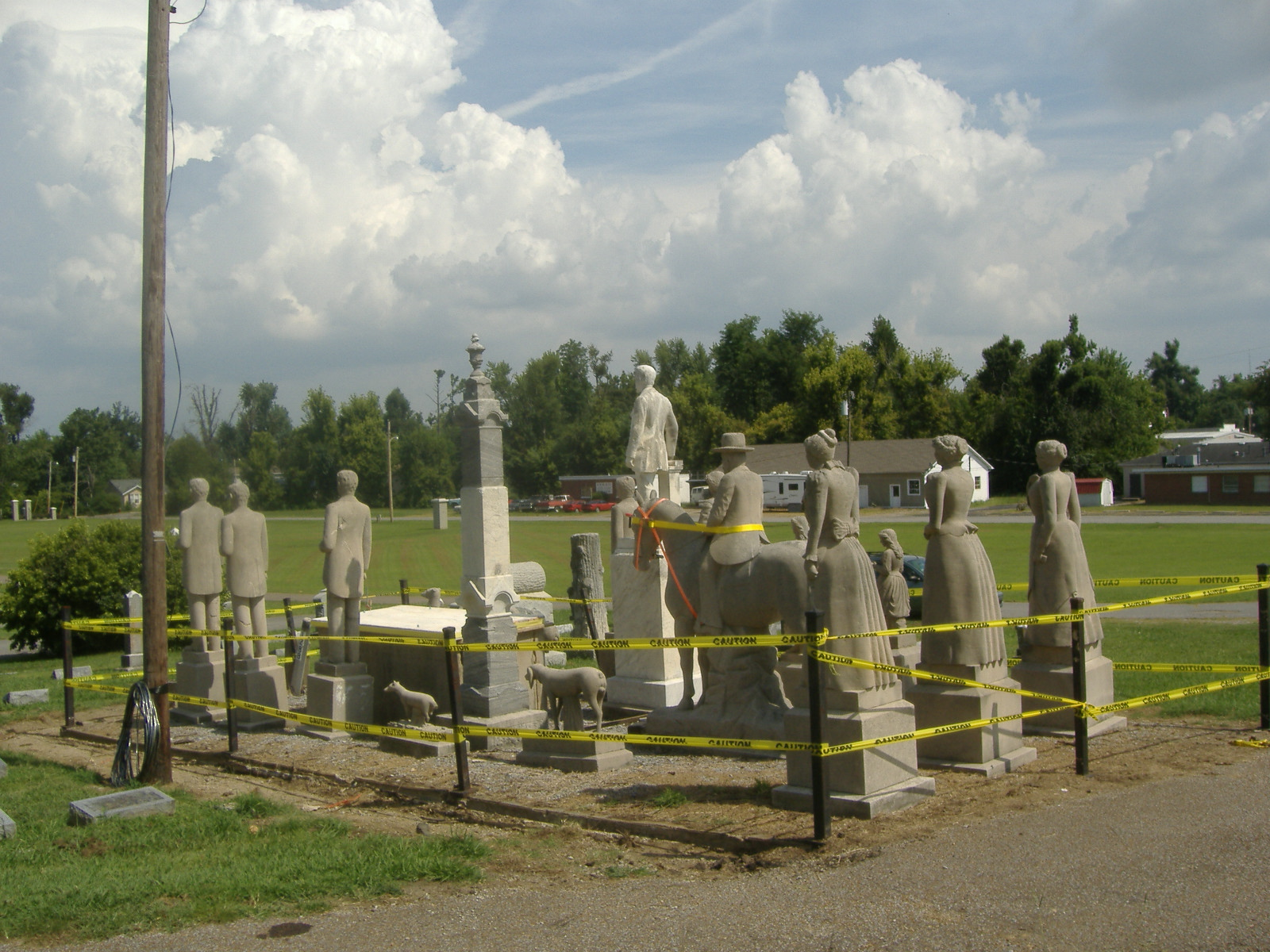
2010 picture of the damage

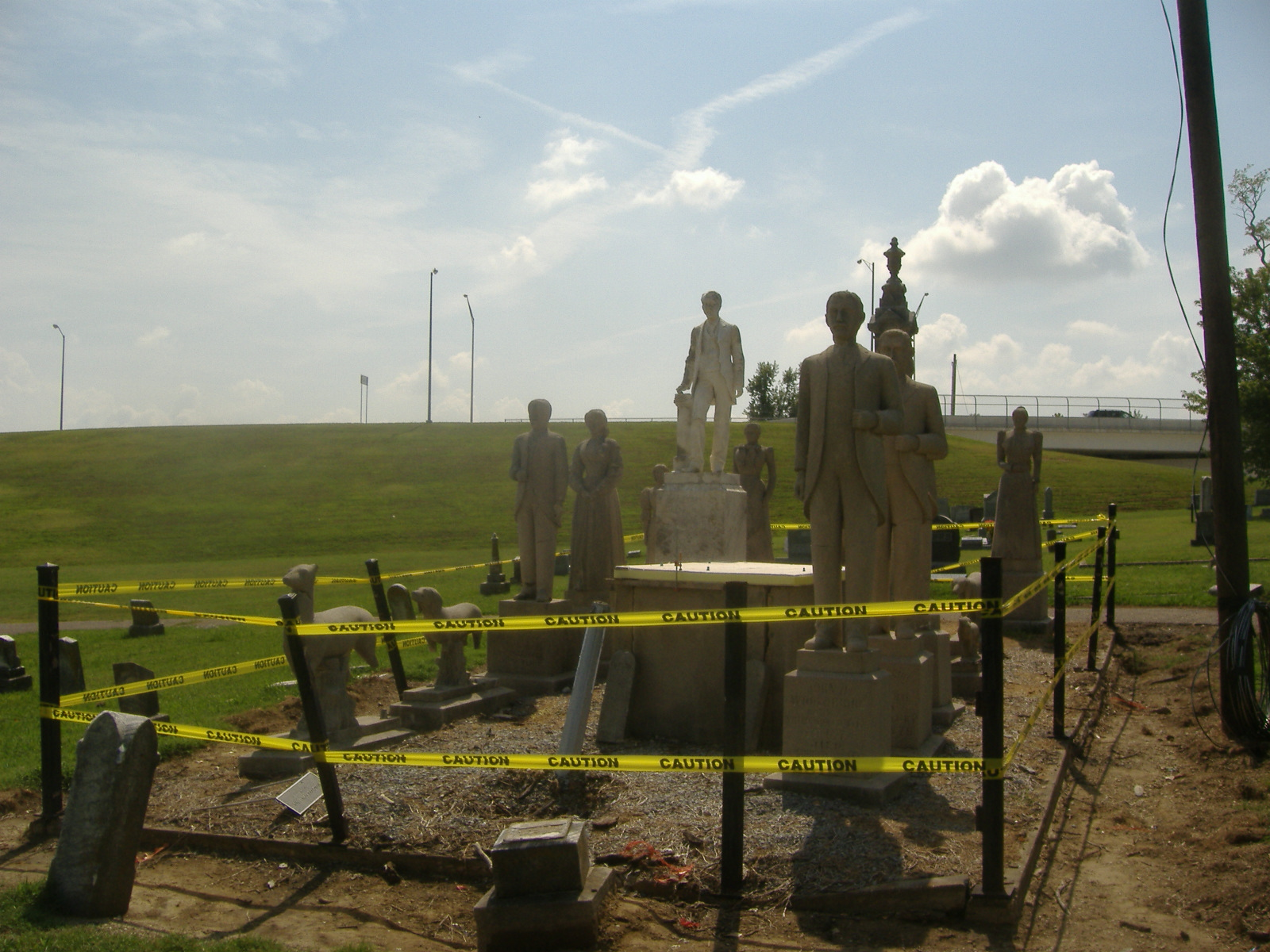
2010 picture of the damage

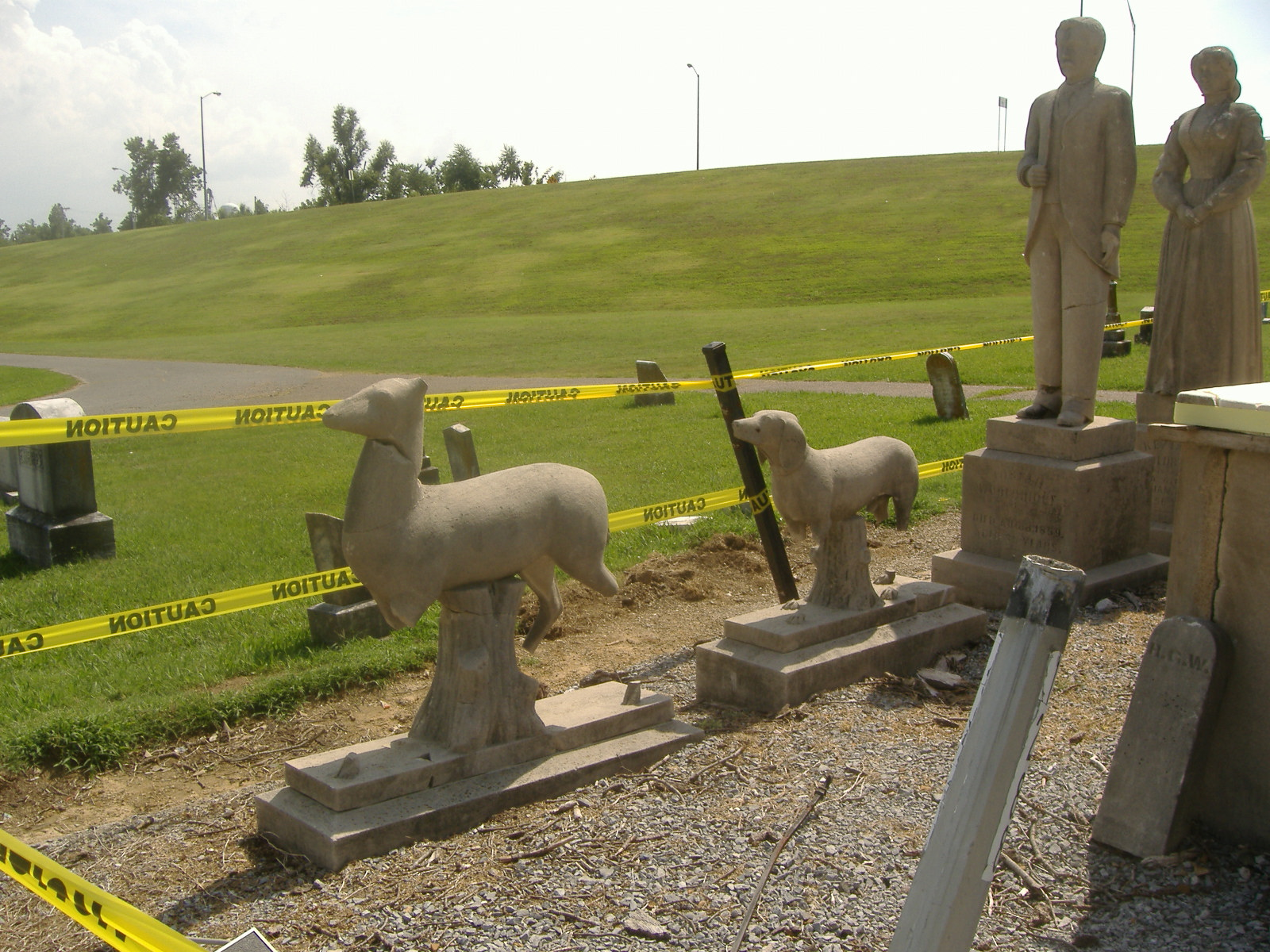
2010 picture of the damage

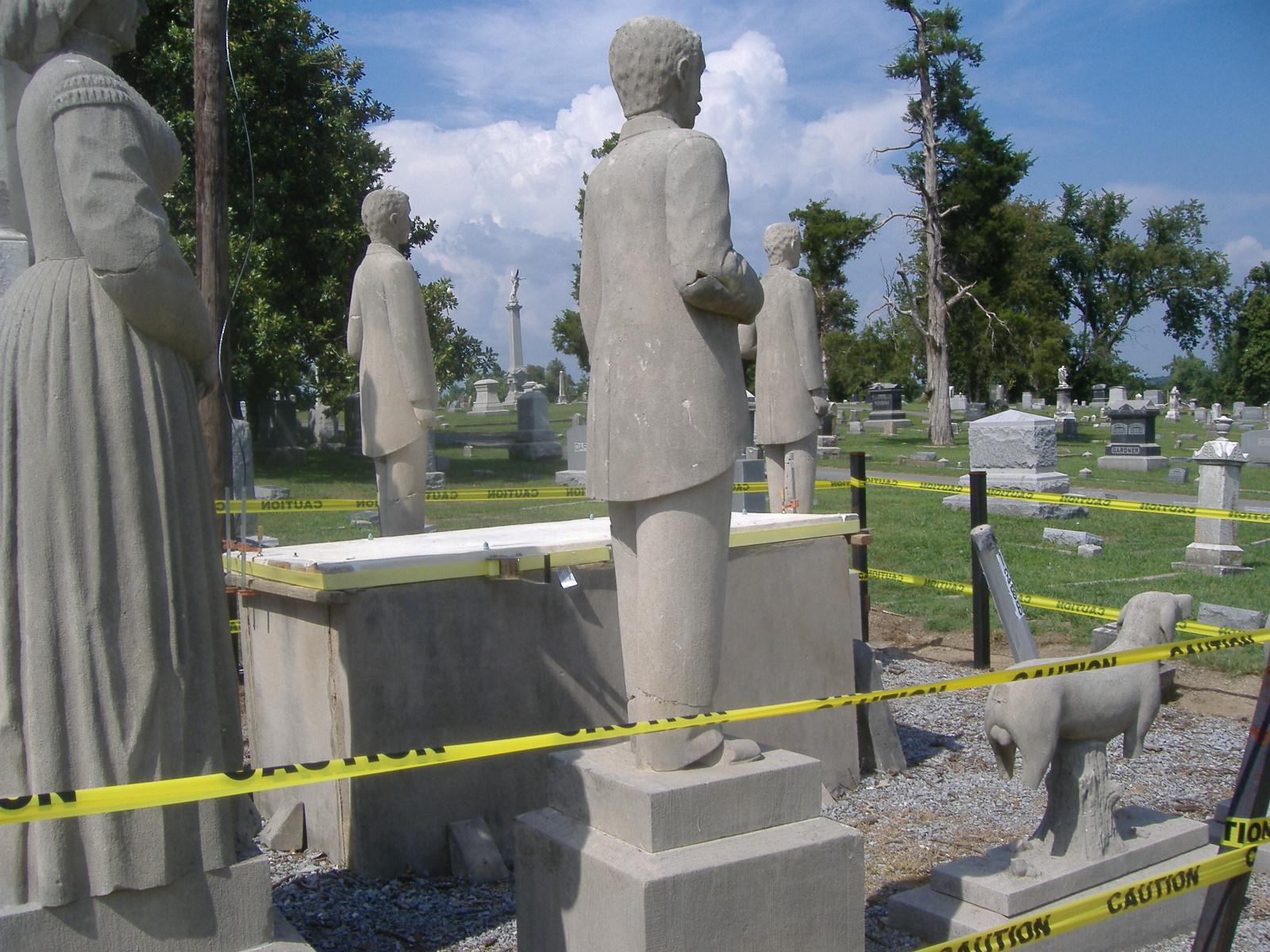
2010 picture of the damage
