= Murray City Council =

Murray City Council is the city council in Murray, Kentucky, USA.

It includes twelve councillors and the Mayor.
