= Confederate Memorial Gates in Mayfield =

- U.S. National Register of Historic Places
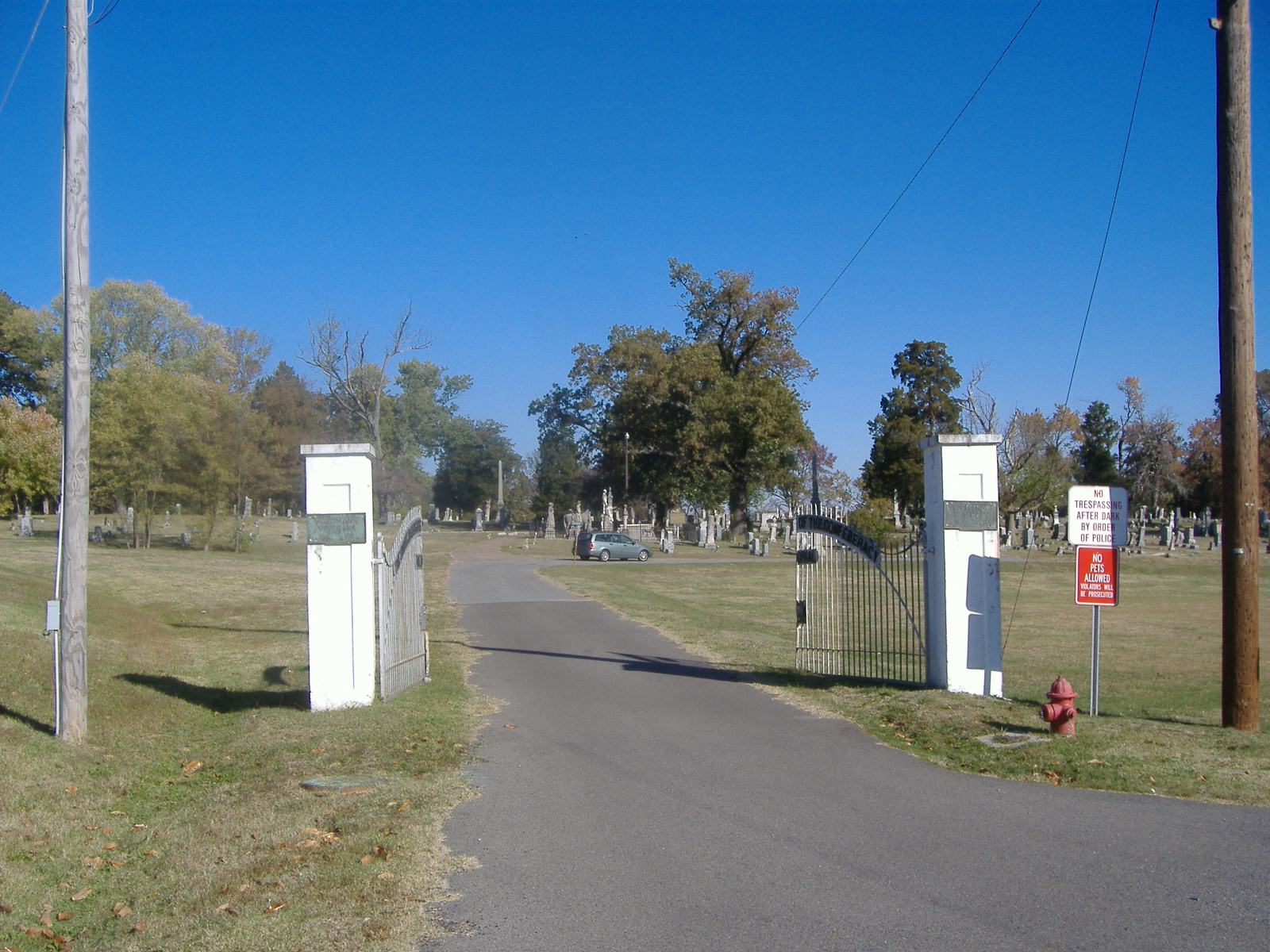
- Main gate

- Location within Kentucky Location within the United States
- Location: Maplewood Cemetery. Corner of N. 7th Street and E. Cemetery Rd, off . of KY 121, Mayfield, Kentucky
- Built: 1924
- MPS: Civil War Monuments of Kentucky MPS
- NRHP reference No.: 97000696
- Added to NRHP: July 17, 1997

The Confederate Memorial Gates in Mayfield are historical monuments at the entrances to Maplewood Cemetery in Mayfield, Kentucky. The monuments were the second monument in Mayfield established by the United Daughters of the Confederacy; the first being the Confederate Memorial in Mayfield in downtown Mayfield. The gates were the third choice for monuments, chosen mostly due to their relatively low cost. The UDC intended them to not only be a monument to the residents of Graves County who served the Confederate States of America, but also a civic improvement.

== Description ==
The monuments are three pairs of stuccoed poured concrete gateposts, six in total, each. When closed, the main pair's gates read, "THE UNITED DAUGHTERS OF THE CONFEDERACY / MEMORIAL". The main pair has bronze plaques. The left gatepost's plaque reads, "WORLD WAR / VETERANS / 1914 1918" and the right gatepost's plaque reads, "CONFEDERATE / VETERANS / 1861 1865". The main pair of gateposts is each two feet wide and ten feet tall, with 27 feet between them. The center pair of gateposts is each three feet wide, ten feet tall, and 285 feet away from the main gates. The third pair of gateposts is each two feet wide, ten feet tall, and 330 feet away from the center gates.

== National Register of Historic Places ==
On July 17, 1997, the posts and gates were one of sixty-one different monuments to the Civil War in Kentucky placed on the National Register of Historic Places, as part of the Civil War Monuments of Kentucky Multiple Property Submission. One other monument on the list, the Confederate Memorial in Mayfield, is nearby in downtown Mayfield; the only other one in Graves County is the Camp Beauregard Memorial in Water Valley. In Maplewood Cemetery are the Wooldridge Monuments, also on the National Register. The only other gateway on the list is the Confederate Memorial Gateway in Hickman.

== Gallery ==
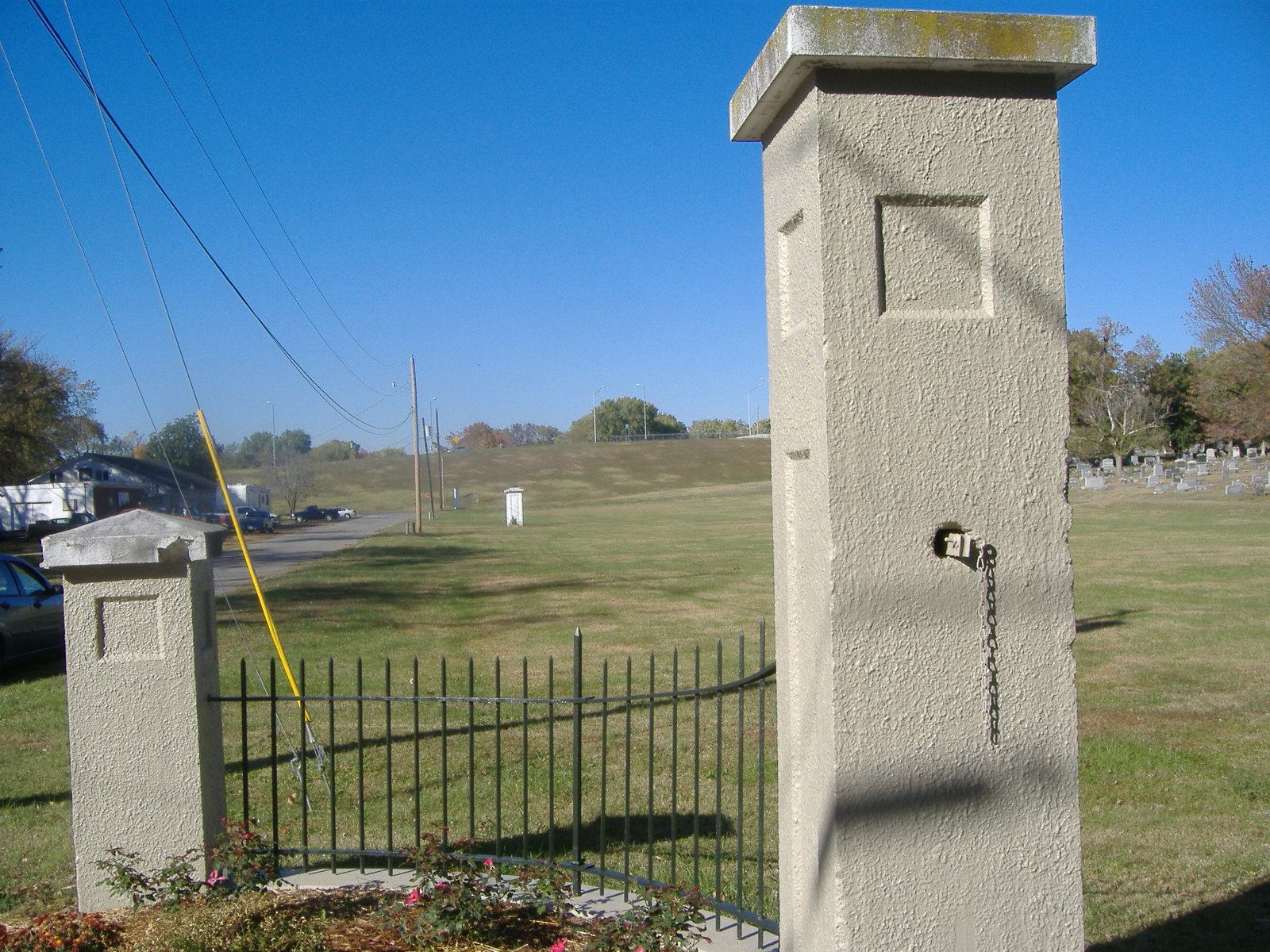
All six monuments views at once

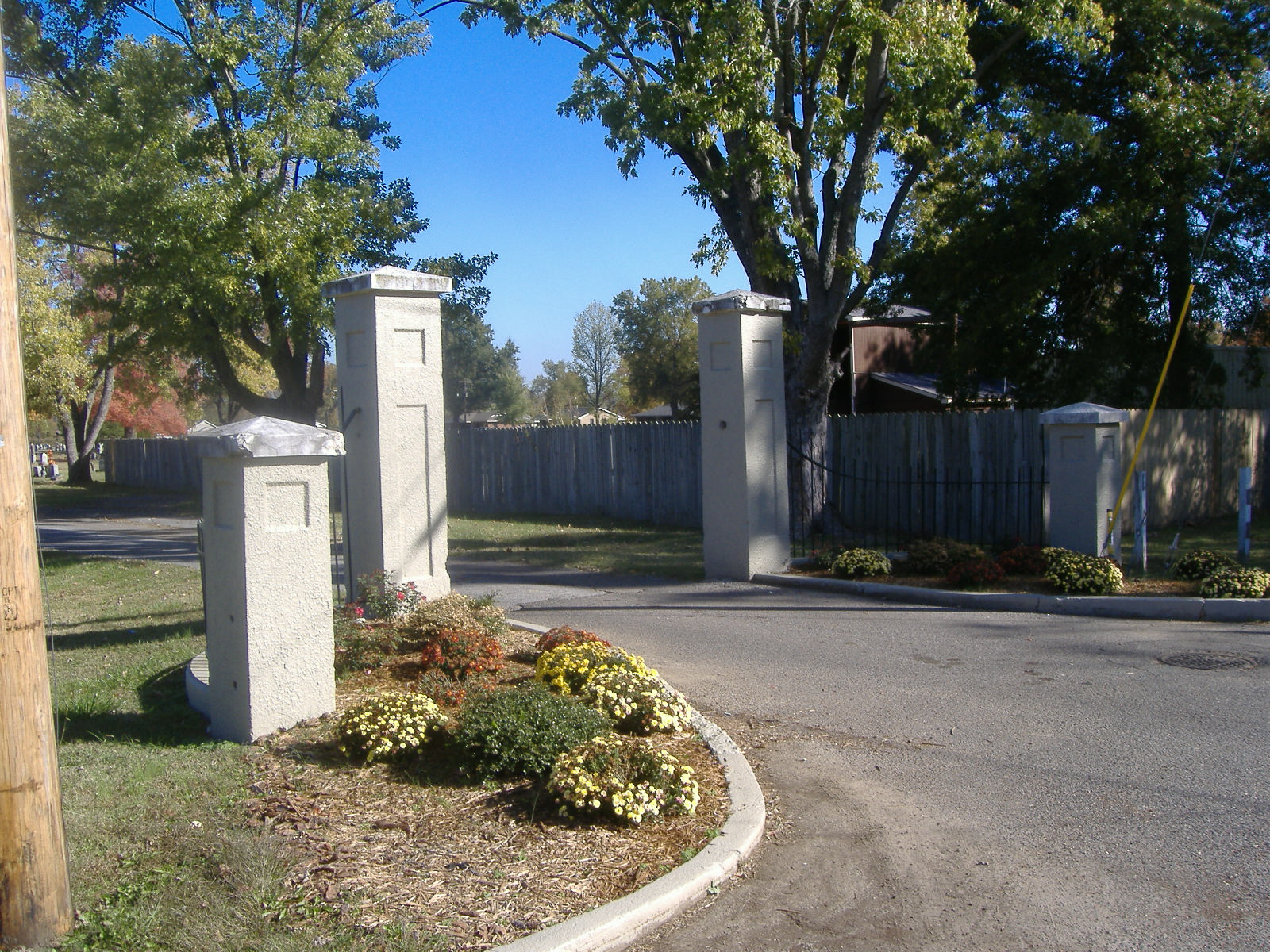
The fifth and sixth of the posts.

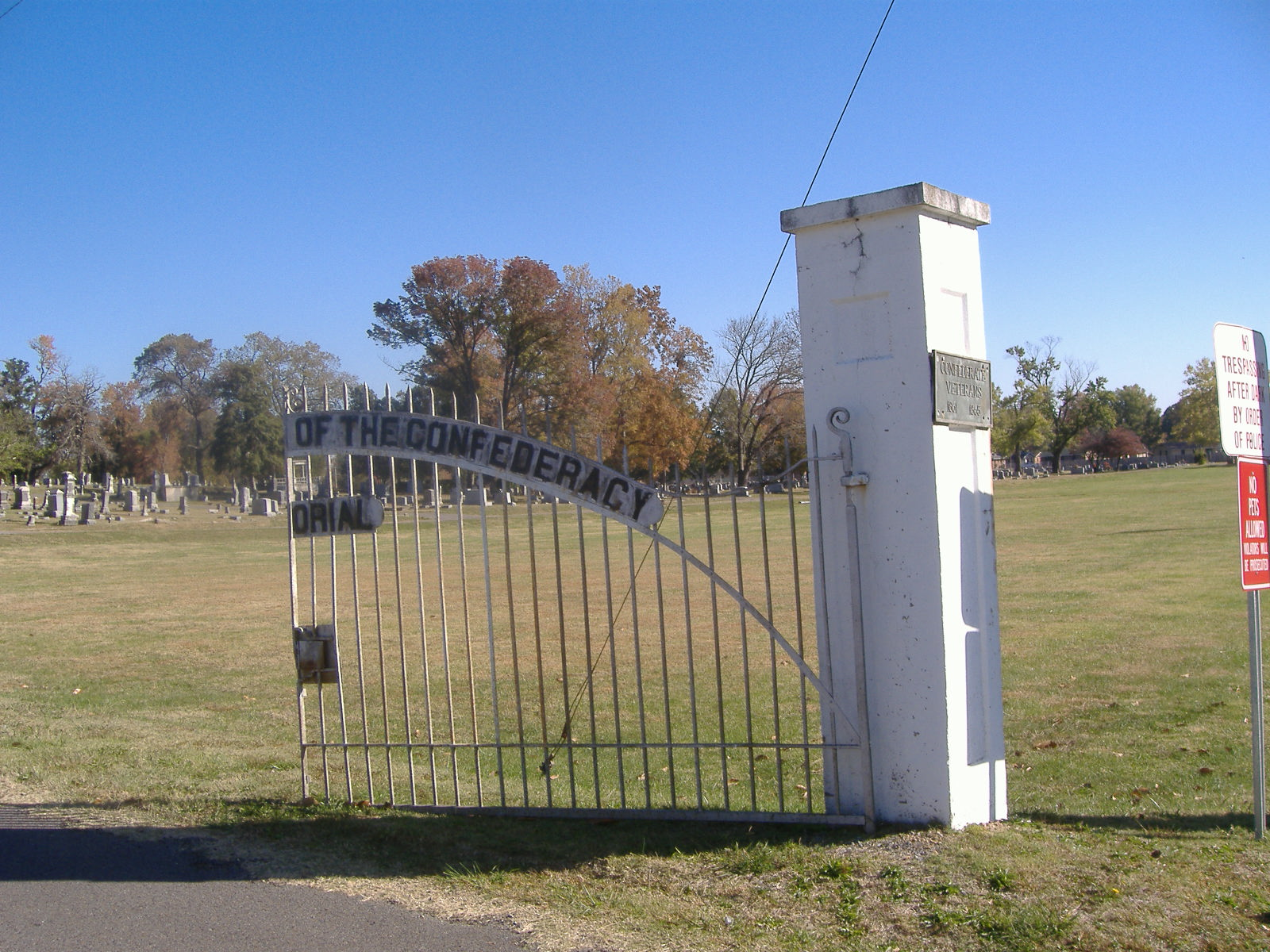
Closeup of the main gate
