= Confederate Memorial in Mayfield =

- U.S. National Register of Historic Places
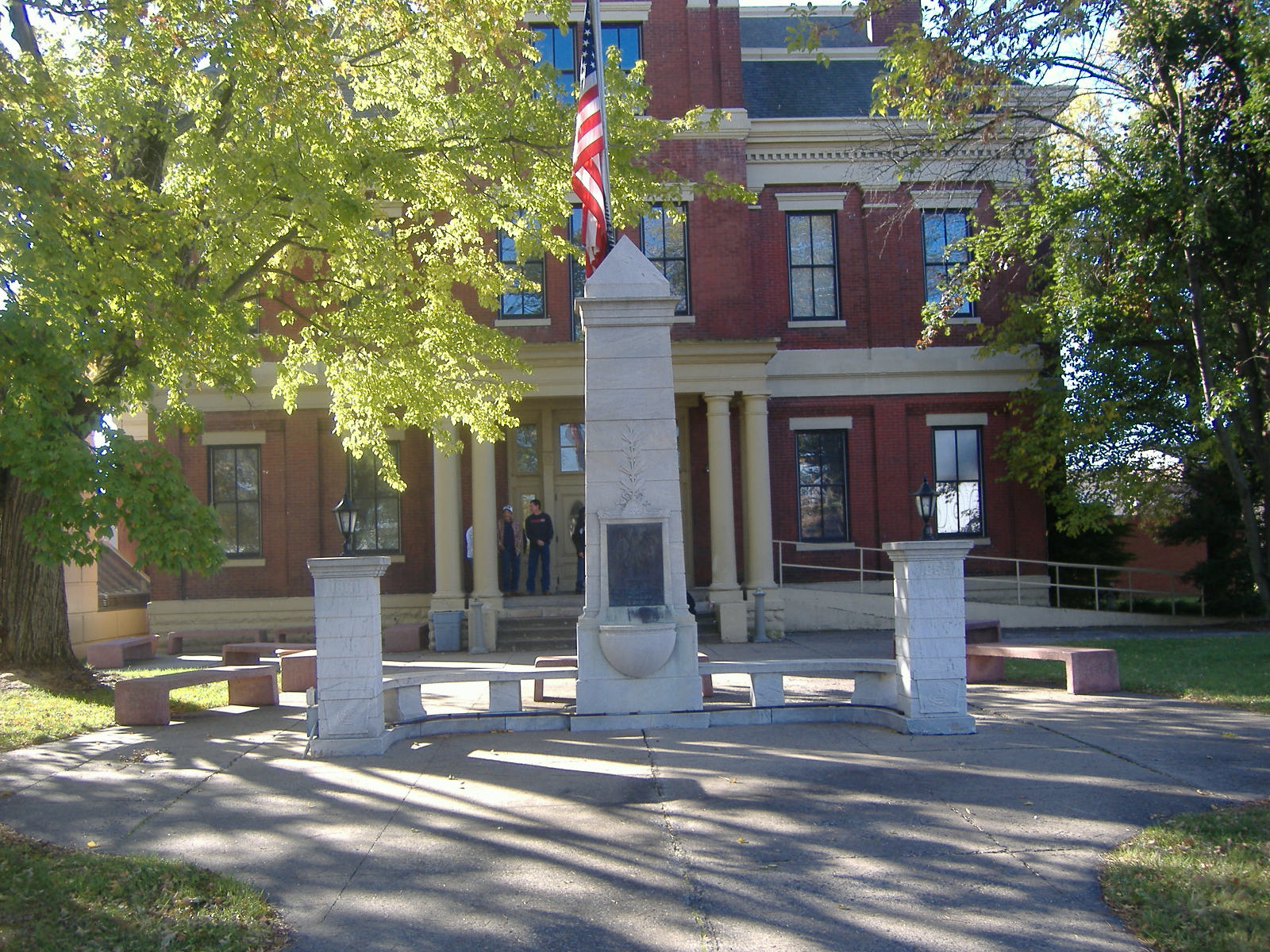

- Location within Kentucky Location within the United States
- Location: Courthouse lawn, Mayfield, Kentucky
- Built: 1920
- Architect: McNeal Marble Co., Marietta, GA
- MPS: Civil War Monuments of Kentucky MPS
- NRHP reference No.: 97000697
- Added to NRHP: July 17, 1997

The Confederate Memorial in Mayfield is a commemorative monument and fountain located on the courthouse lawn in downtown Mayfield, Kentucky.

== Mayfield ==
Mayfield during the Civil War was very supportive of the Confederate States of America. Representatives from seven western Kentucky counties and twenty western Tennessee counties met at Mayfield in May 1861 to discuss forming a new state that would join the Confederacy. The secession of Tennessee on June 8, 1861, caused the proposal to be abandoned, In 1864 Union forces occupied the town and forced the townspeople to help fortify the courthouse, which was destroyed later that year. The courthouse behind the memorial fountain was built in 1889.

== Description ==
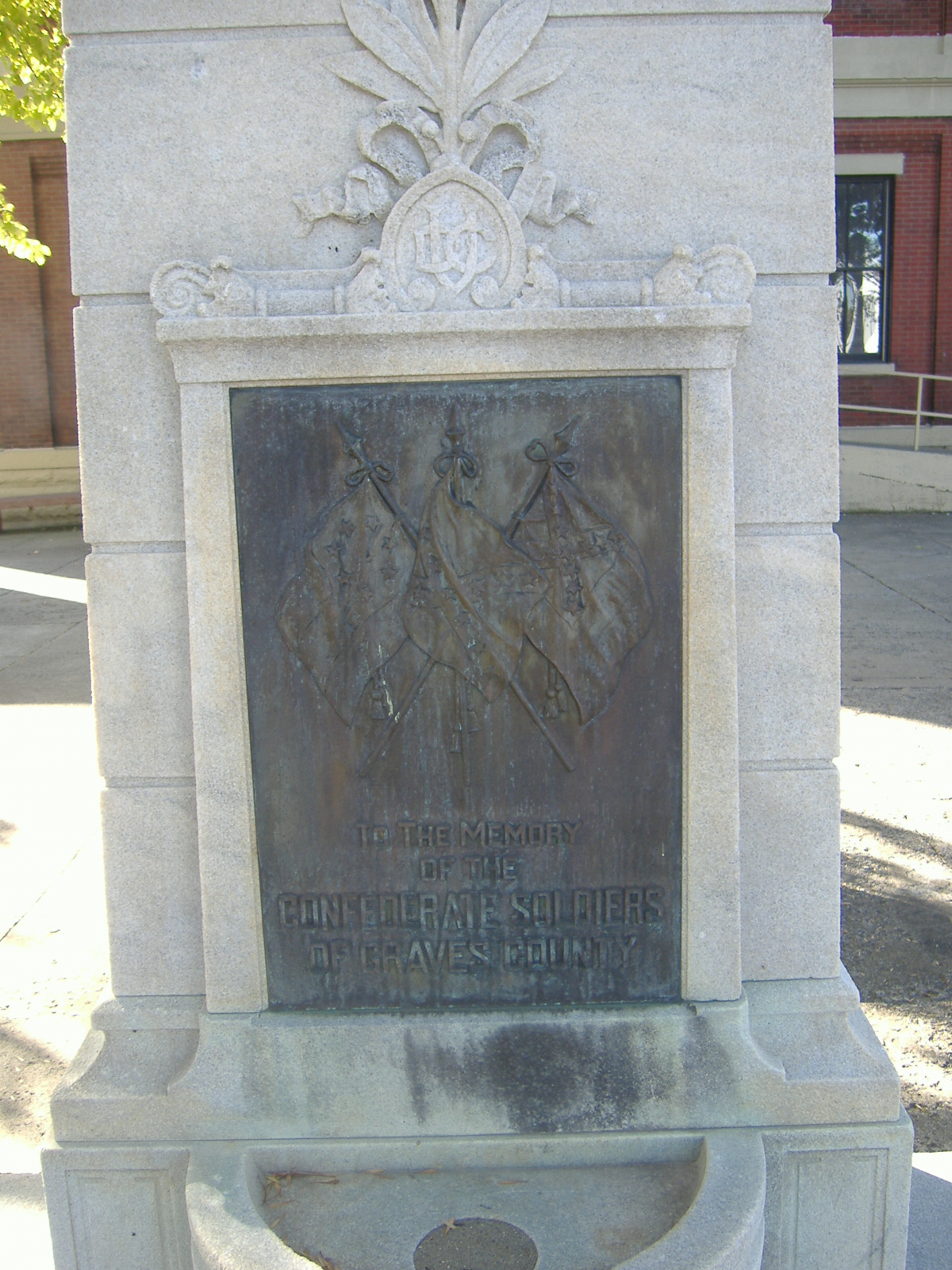
Plaque on the memorial

Mayfield's United Daughters of the Confederacy obtained the fountain in 1917 from the McNeal Marble Company in Marietta, Georgia at the cost of $1,650. (equivalent to $40,000 in 2025). The fountain, which no longer emits water, is a 10-foot-tall (3.0 m) obelisk with wings that double as benches. On the end of the wings are 6-foot-tall (1.8 m) light posts that are eight feet away from the center obelisk. Below the northern post's light is inscribed "1861", and below the southern post's light is inscribed "1865". At the base of each light post is a CSA symbol. The center obelisk has a plaque with three different Confederate flags in copper relief on its top. The plaque's inscription reads, "TO THE MEMORY / OF THE / CONFEDERATE SOLDIERS / OF GRAVES COUNTY".

== National Register of Historic Places ==
On July 17, 1997, it was one of sixty-one different monuments to the Civil War in Kentucky placed on the National Register of Historic Places, as part of the Civil War Monuments of Kentucky Multiple Property Submission. One other monument on the list, the Confederate Memorial Gates in Mayfield, is nearby in Maplewood Cemetery, north of downtown Mayfield. Other monuments on the list that are also fountains are the Confederate Monument of Cadiz and the Confederate Memorial Fountain in Hopkinsville.
