= Water Valley, Kentucky =

- Census-designated place
- Location of Water Valley in Graves County, Kentucky.
- Coordinates: 36°34′0″N 88°48′39″W
- Country: United States
- State: Kentucky
- County: Graves

Area
  - Total: 0.53 sq mi (1.38 km^{2})
  - Land: 0.53 sq mi (1.38 km^{2})
  - Water: 0 sq mi (0.00 km^{2})
- Elevation: 390 ft (119 m)

Population (2020)
  - Total: 235
  - Density: 440.3/sq mi (170.01/km^{2})
- Time zone: UTC-6 (Central (CST))
  - Summer (DST): UTC-5 (CDT)
- ZIP code: 42085
- Area codes: 270 & 364
- FIPS code: 21-80832
- GNIS feature ID: 0506261

Water Valley is a census-designated place and former home rule-class city in Graves County, Kentucky, United States. The population was 235 as of the 2020 census. It was incorporated on April 19, 1884, and had its charter dissolved via court order effective June 20, 2016.

== Geography ==
Water Valley is located at 36°34′0″N 88°48′39″W (36.566559, -88.810928).

According to the United States Census Bureau, the incorporated city has a total area of 0.6 square miles (1.6 km^{2}), all land.

== Demographics ==
Historical population
Census	Pop.	Note	%±
1880	100		—
1890	115		15.0%
1900	254		120.9%
1910	228		−10.2%
1920	377		65.4%
1930	351		−6.9%
1940	373		6.3%
1950	346		−7.2%
1960	267		−22.8%
1970	285		6.7%
1980	395		38.6%
1990	321		−18.7%
2000	316		−1.6%
2010	279		−11.7%
2020	235		−15.8%
U.S. Decennial Census

As of the census of 2000, there were 316 people, 141 households, and 90 families residing in the city. The population density was 508.0 inhabitants per square mile (196.1/km^{2}). There were 166 housing units at an average density of 266.8 per square mile (103.0/km^{2}). The racial makeup of the city was 94.94% White, 4.75% African American, 0.32% from other races. Hispanic or Latino of any race were 0.32% of the population.

There were 141 households, out of which 29.1% had children under the age of 18 living with them, 50.4% were married couples living together, 9.9% had a female householder with no husband present, and 35.5% were non-families. 34.8% of all households were made up of individuals, and 18.4% had someone living alone who was 65 years of age or older. The average household size was 2.24 and the average family size was 2.84.

In the city, the population was spread out, with 24.1% under the age of 18, 7.6% from 18 to 24, 26.3% from 25 to 44, 23.7% from 45 to 64, and 18.4% who were 65 years of age or older. The median age was 40 years. For every 100 females, there were 89.2 males. For every 100 females age 18 and over, there were 83.2 males.

The median income for a household in the city was $26,071, and the median income for a family was $33,750. Males had a median income of $27,361 versus $17,500 for females. The per capita income for the city was $14,387. About 17.5% of families and 21.1% of the population were below the poverty line, including 37.2% of those under age 18 and 14.3% of those age 65 or over.
