= Confederate Monument (Cadiz, Kentucky) =

- Confederate Monument of Cadiz
- U.S. National Register of Historic Places
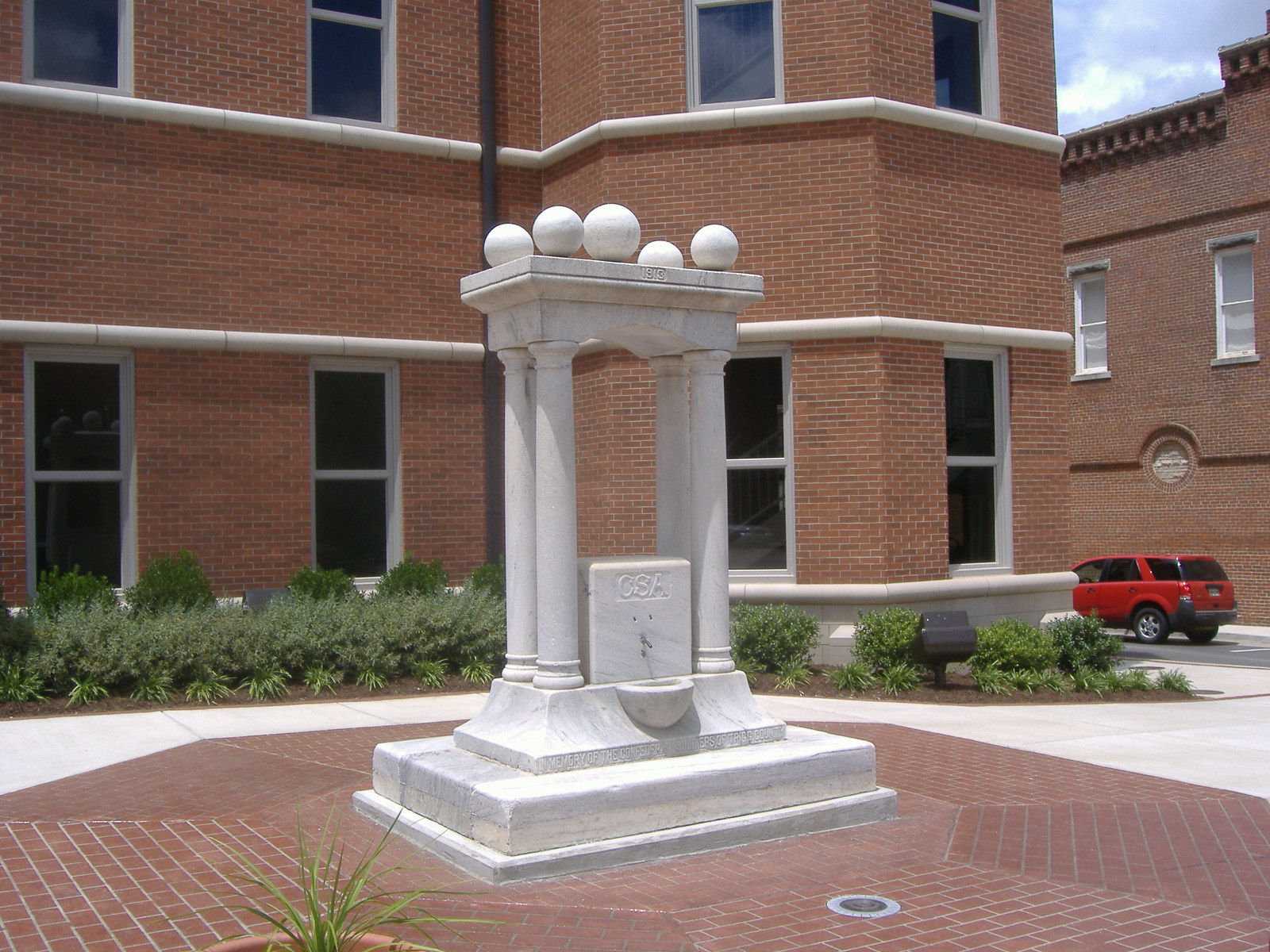

- Location within Kentucky Location within the United States
- Location: Courthouse Lawn. 0.5 mi. E of jct. of KY 139 and KY 1175, Cadiz, Kentucky
- Built: 1913
- MPS: Civil War Monuments of Kentucky MPS
- NRHP reference No.: 97000667
- Added to NRHP: July 17, 1997

The Confederate Monument, in Cadiz, Kentucky, was placed on the National Register of Historic Places in 1997. A marble memorial to the Confederate veterans of Trigg County, it was erected in 1913 by the United Daughters of the Confederacy.

The monument is located off Main Street and is about 10 feet (3.0 m) tall. It has four Doric columns with a limestone cube in between. The cube was once a fountain.

It was located on a lawn in front of a historic courthouse, but the courthouse was demolished in 2008 and replaced by a new justice center in 2009.
