= List of cemeteries in Kentucky =

This list of cemeteries in Kentucky includes currently operating, historical (closed for new interments), and defunct (graves abandoned or removed) cemeteries, columbaria, and mausolea which are historical and/or notable. It does not include pet cemeteries.

== Bourbon County ==
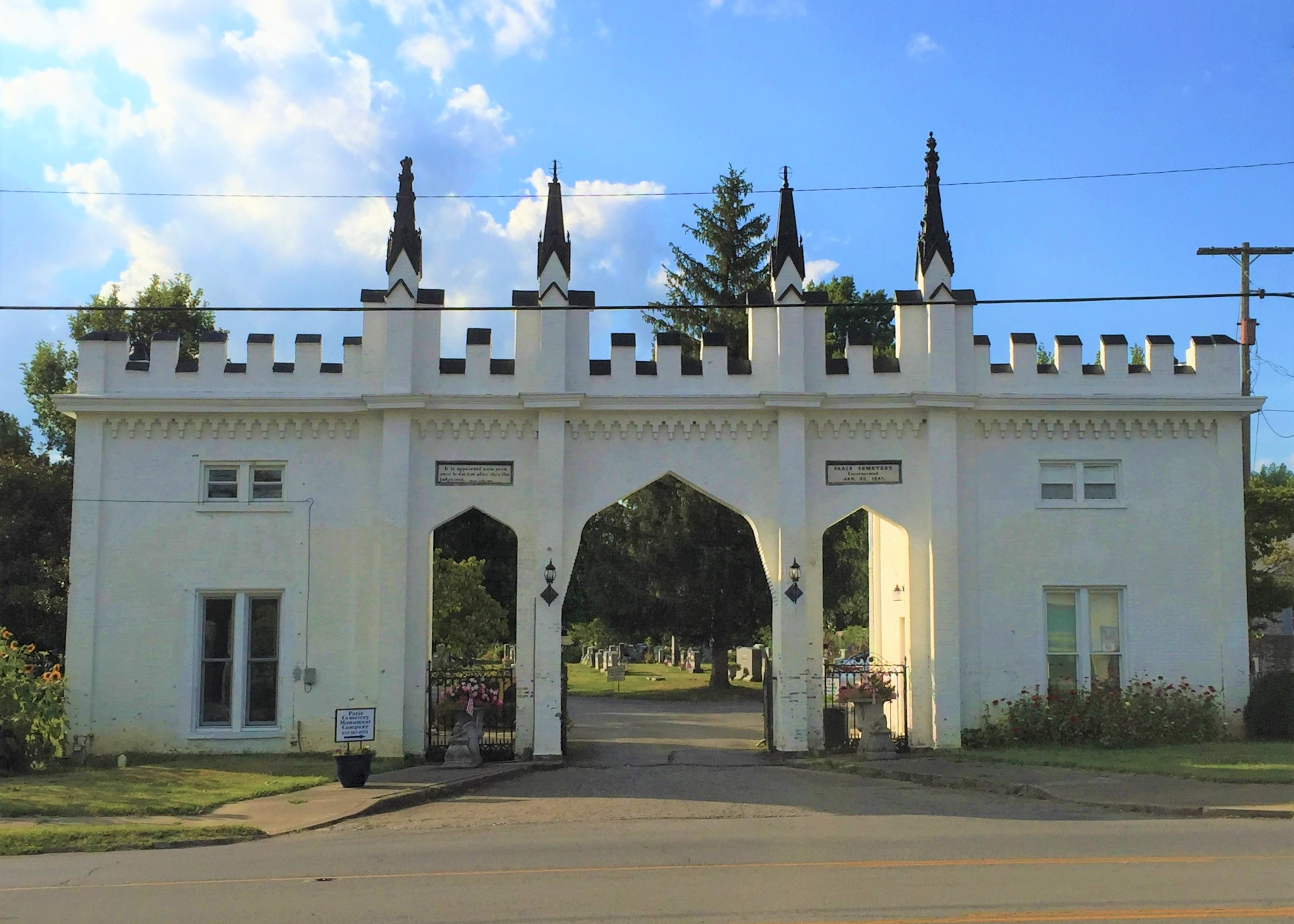
Paris Cemetery gatehouse in Paris, Bourbon County

- Paris Cemetery, Paris; NRHP-listed

== Boyd County ==
- Ashland Cemetery, Ashland
- Bellevue Cemetery, Danville
- Danville National Cemetery, Danville; NRHP-listed

== Campbell County ==
- Evergreen Cemetery, Southgate
- St. Joseph Catholic Church, Camp Springs; NRHP-listed
- St. John's Lutheran Cemetery, near Alexandria; NRHP-listed

== Daviess County ==
- Athey's Chapel Cemetery, Rome
- Bethlehem Baptist Cemetery, Utica
- Rosehill Elmwood Cemetery, Owensboro

== Edmonson County ==
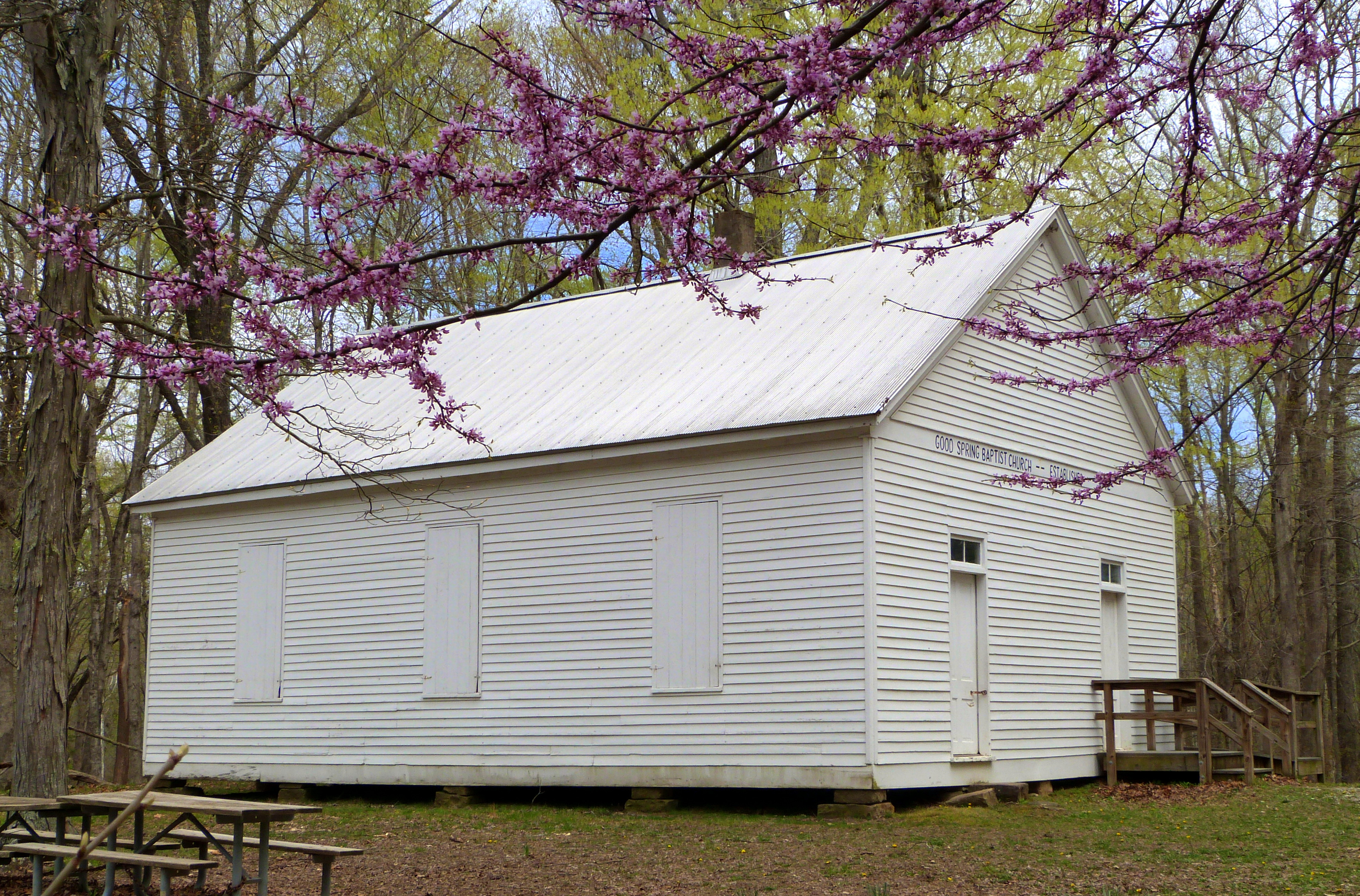
Good Spring Baptist Church and Cemetery in Mammoth Cave National Park, Edmonson County

- Good Spring Baptist Church and Cemetery in Mammoth Cave National Park; NRHP-listed
- Joppa Baptist Church and Cemetery in Mammoth Cave National Park; NRHP-listed
- Mammoth Cave Baptist Church and Cemetery in Mammoth Cave National Park; NRHP-listed

== Fayette County ==
- African Cemetery No. 2, Lexington; NRHP-listed
- Episcopal Burying Ground and Chapel, Lexington; NRHP-listed
- Lexington Cemetery, Lexington; NRHP-listed
- Lexington National Cemetery, Lexington; NRHP-listed

== Fleming County ==
- Elizaville Cemetery, Elizaville

== Franklin County ==
- Frankfort Cemetery, Frankfort; NRHP-listed

== Garrard County ==
- Lancaster Cemetery, Lancaster; NRHP-listed

== Jefferson County ==
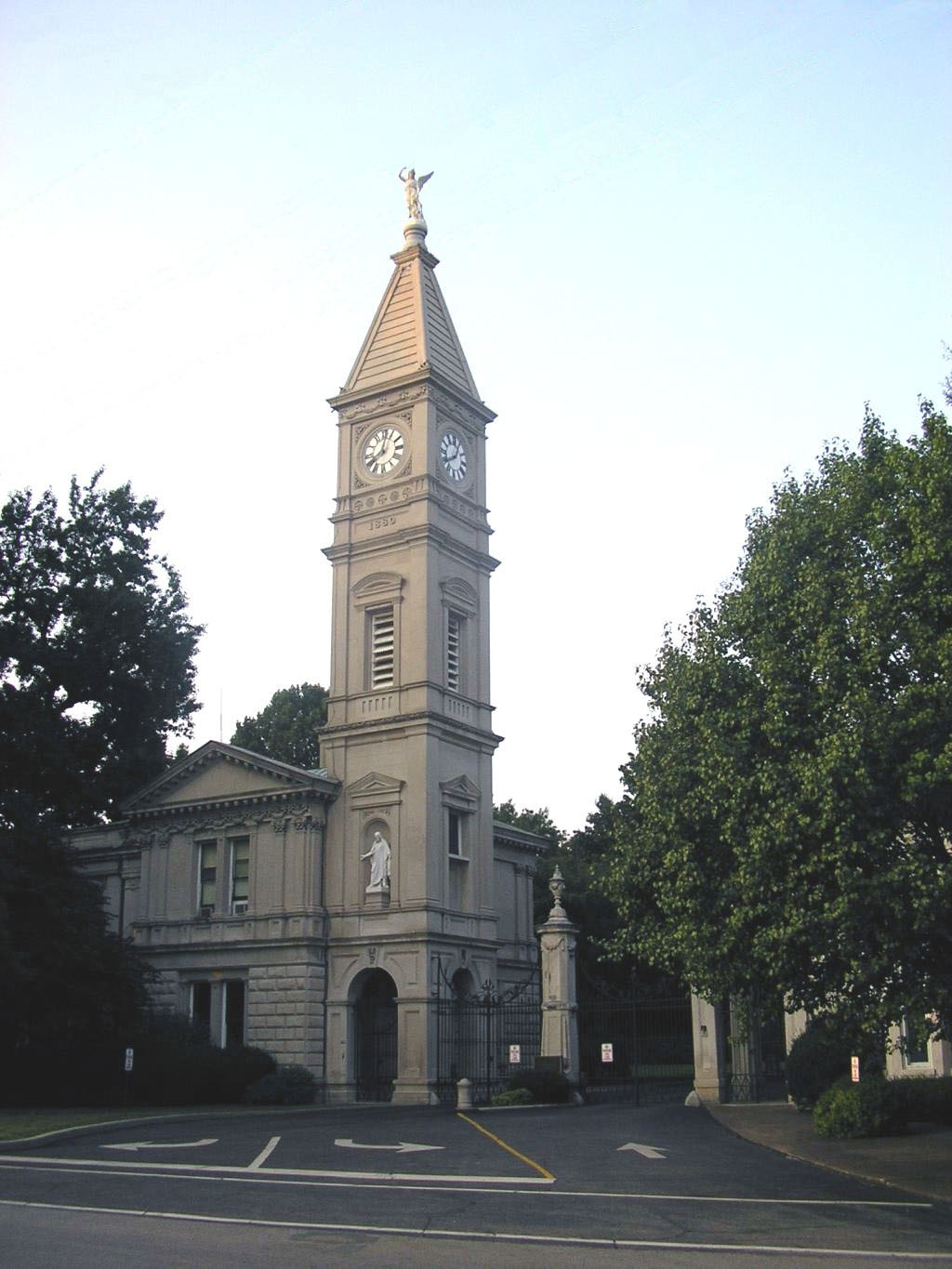
Cave Hill Cemetery main entrance in Louisville, Jefferson County

- Calvary Cemetery, Louisville
- Cave Hill Cemetery, Louisville; NRHP-listed
- Eastern Cemetery, Louisville
- Long Run Baptist Church and Cemetery, Louisville; NRHP-listed
- St. Louis Cemetery, Louisville
- Zachary Taylor National Cemetery, Louisville; NRHP-listed

== Jessamine County ==
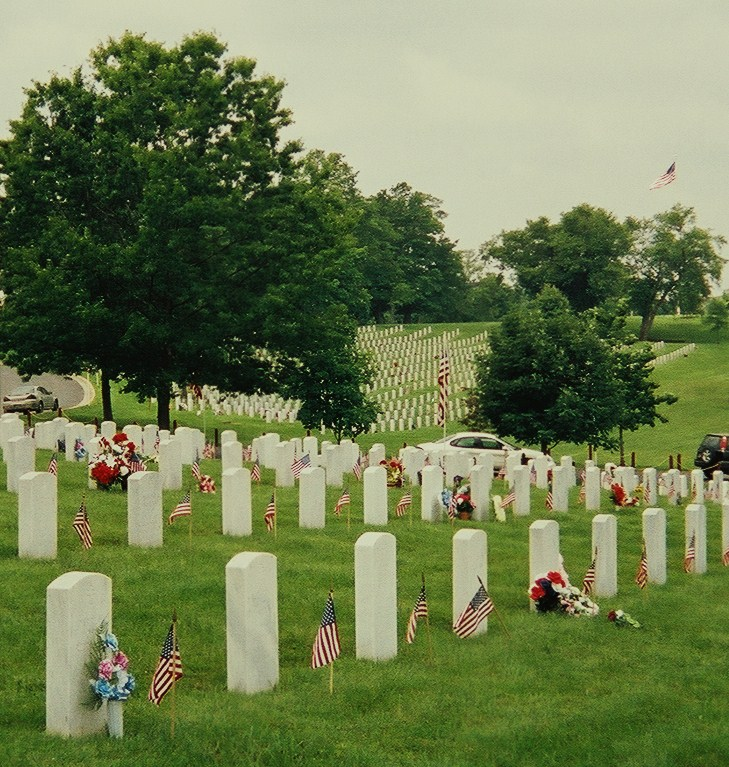
Camp Nelson National Cemetery in Nicholasville, Jessamine County

- Camp Nelson National Cemetery, Nicholasville; NRHP-listed

== Kenton County ==
- Forest Lawn Memorial Park, Erlanger
- Linden Grove Cemetery, Covington; NRHP-listed
- Mother of God Cemetery, Covington

== Lincoln County ==
- Isaac Shelby Cemetery State Historic Site, Junction City

== Logan County ==
- Red River Presbyterian Meetinghouse Site and Cemetery, Adairville; NRHP-listed

== Marion County ==
- Lebanon National Cemetery, Lebanon; NRHP-listed

== McCracken County ==
- Mount Kenton Cemetery, Paducah

== Monroe County ==
- Tompkinsville National Cemetery, Tompkinsville

== Montgomery County ==
- Machpelah Cemetery, Mount Sterling; NRHP-listed
- Nelson County
- Highview Cemetery, Chaplin

== Oldham County ==
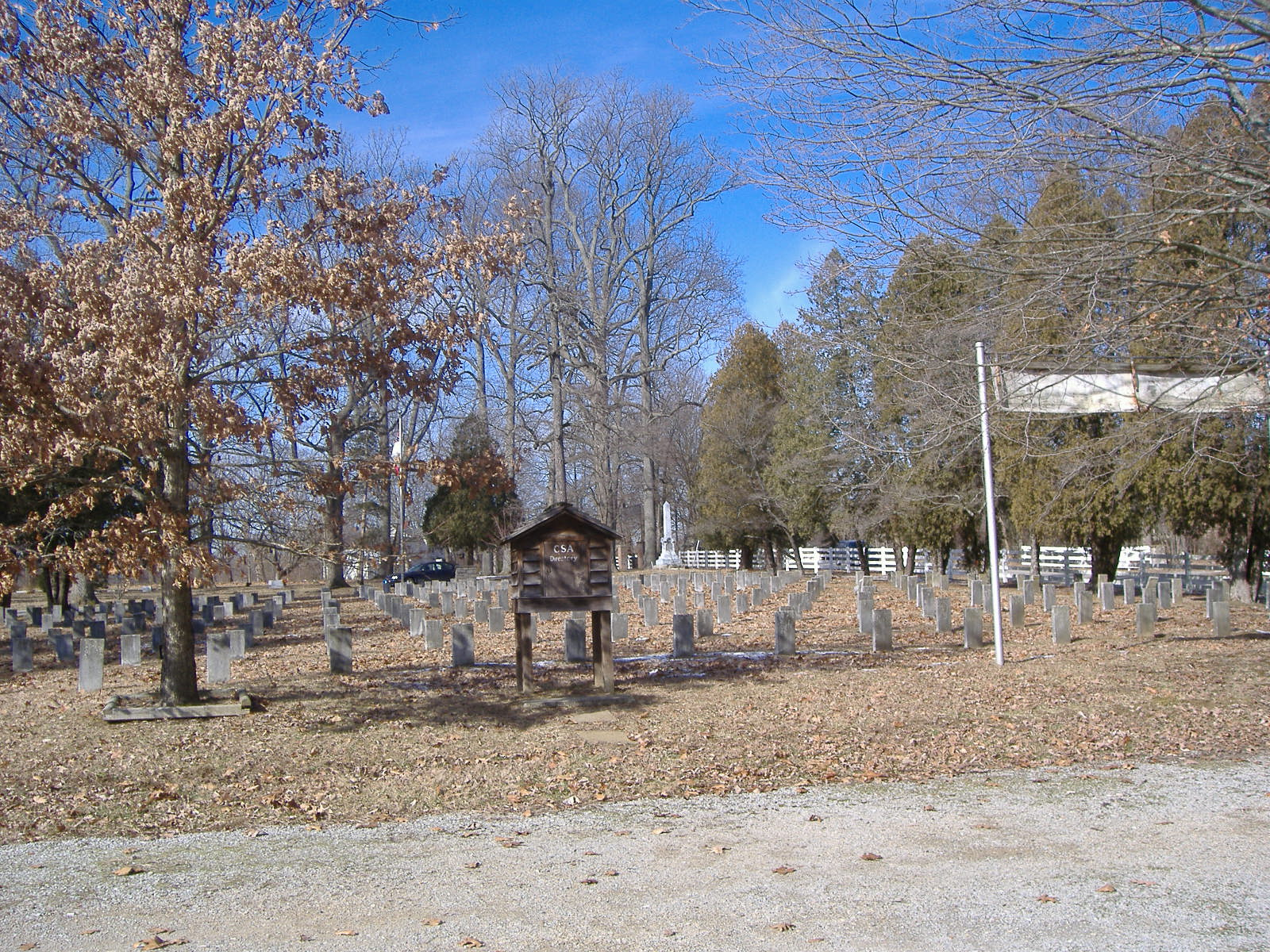
Pewee Valley Confederate Cemetery in Pewee Valley, Oldham County

- Pewee Valley Confederate Cemetery, Pewee Valley; NRHP-listed

== Pendleton County ==
- Bethel Cemetery and Church, Falmouth

== Pulaski County ==
- Mill Springs National Cemetery, Nancy; NRHP-listed

== Scott County ==
- Georgetown Cemetery, Georgetown

== Shelby County ==
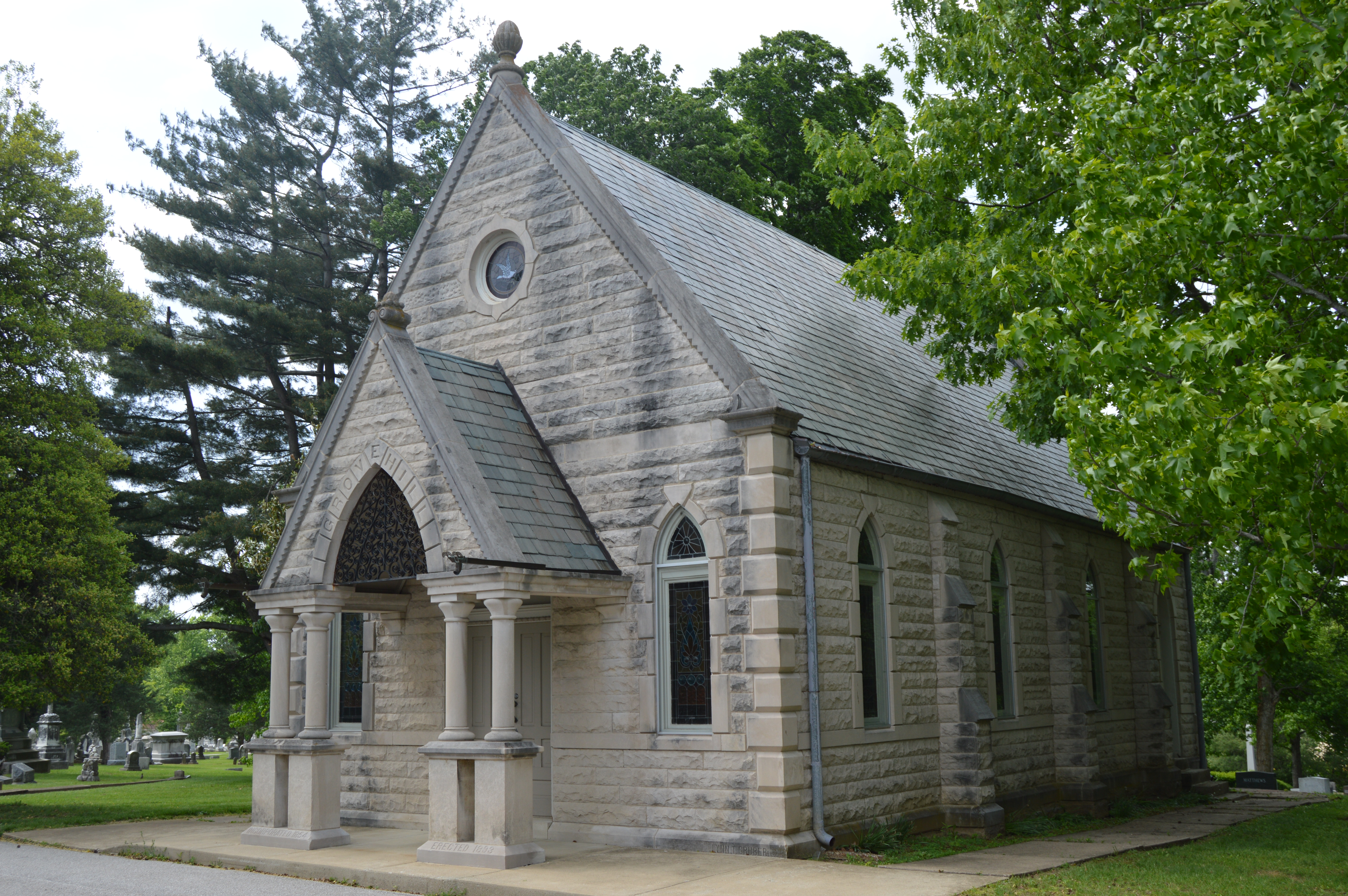
Grove Hill Cemetery Chapel in Shelbyville, Shelby County

- Grove Hill Cemetery Chapel, Shelbyville; NRHP-listed

== See also ==
- List of cemeteries in the United States
- National Register of Historic Places listings in Kentucky
