= Dossey =

Dossey is a surname. Notable people with the surname include:

- Ibrahim Dossey, Ghanaian footballer
- Jack Dossey III, American racing driver
- John Dossey (1944–2024), American mathematician
- Kelsey Dossey, American soccer player
- Larry Dossey (1940–2026), American internist and author
- Leslie Dossey, Historian at Loyola University Chicago

== See also ==
- Reed-Dossey House, historic house in Brownsville, Kentucky, U.S.
