= Elko, Kentucky =

Elko
- Ghost town
- Location within the state of Kentucky Elko (the United States)
- Coordinates: 37°9′42.17″N 86°8′6.92″W
- Country: United States
- State: Kentucky
- County: Edmonson
- Settled: Early 1800s
- Vacated: 1938
- Elevation: 738 ft (225 m)
- Time zone: UTC-6 (Central (CST))
  - Summer (DST): UTC-5 (CDT)
- GNIS feature ID: 507924

Elko was an unincorporated community in eastern Edmonson County in south-central Kentucky, United States. It was one of a few settlements in eastern Edmonson County that were displaced for the area to become a portion of Mammoth Cave National Park.

== History ==
The first settlers to have lived in the community, consisting of at least five families, arrived in the early 1800s. The first building was a log schoolhouse, which doubled as a church, that was completed in 1861; the original building was demolished to make way for its current building, which was completed in 1900. Prior to 1934, Elko was a thriving farming community that was home to several houses, a school, and a post office, along with a few businesses such as a general store as well as a church, the Pleasant Union United Baptist Church (later renamed as the Joppa Missionary Baptist Church). The community may have previously been known as Joppa because of the name of the church, or because of its location within the area known as Joppa Ridge.

Between 1934 and 1936, the National Park Service (NPS) began purchasing the farmsteads in the areas using funds donated by the Mammoth Cave National Park Association, a private organization that was formed in Bowling Green by private wealthy citizens in 1925; other tracts were acquired by means of eminent domain. All of Elko's residents were relocated by around 1938. The area officially became a portion of Mammoth Cave National Park upon its dedication on July 1, 1941.

== Historical legacy ==
While most residences and businesses were destroyed after its citizens relocated in anticipation of the Mammoth Cave area becoming a national park in 1941, the Joppa Baptist Church and Cemetery was one of three historical church buildings within park boundaries (the other two were the Mammoth Cave and Good Spring Baptist Churches) that were kept intact for preserving as reminders of the estimated 600 people who lived in the areas now a part of the national park. Special use permits can be granted by the NPS to area congregations who wish to provide maintenance to the church property; the congregation of Joppa Church continued to hold services in the building on a regular basis as late as the early 1970s, with occasional revival meetings being held there as late as 2015. The church was one of 14 locations within the park that were added to the National Register of Historic Places on May 8, 1991.

A few historical cemeteries nearby were also preserved; cemeteries along the roadways remain to be manicured, but some cemeteries in other areas within the park's boundaries are no longer accessible as they were overtaken by the woodlands to become isolated from the remainder of the park.

== Geography ==
Elko was located in the Joppa Ridge area along the present-day Kentucky Route 70 (KY 70) in eastern Edmonson County within the present-day boundaries of Mammoth Cave National Park. The town stood approximately 7.8 miles (12.6 km) east-southeast of Brownsville, the Edmonson County seat, or about 2.9 miles (4.7 km) southwest of the Mammoth Cave Visitors Center. However, some maps of Edmonson County still lists Elko as an existing community.
