= James W. Adams =

American carpenter and builder (1867–1941)

- Born: James Wood Adams; 1867; Mercer County, Kentucky, US
- Died: December 8, 1941 (aged 73–74); Louisville, Kentucky, US
- Burial place: Grove Hill Cemetery
- Occupations: Contractor, carpenter, and building designer

James Wood Adams (1867 – December 8, 1941) was an American contractor, carpenter, and building designer. He worked in south-central Shelby County, Kentucky in the late 19th and early 20th centuries. Four of his works are listed on the U.S. National Register of Historic Places.

== Architecture ==
James W. Adams was a contractor, carpenter, designer, and builder from Southville, Kentucky. He worked in South Central Shelby County, Kentucky in the late 19th and early 20th centuries. Adams designed buildings in a vernacular style that was within traditional standards, but also showed his creativity and adaptability.

The best-surviving example of his residential architecture is the Gray House on Zaring Mill Road in Shelbyville, Kentucky. Built in 1908, the Gray House is in vernacular Princess Anne style, with clapboard, a limestone foundation, and a decorative wood trim. A 1986 survey conducted by the Shelby County Historical Society identified at least four other originally identical houses built by Adams between 1900 and 1910. The survey noted that, "Although buildings such as Adams' houses sometimes appear almost identical, attention to detail and craft inform each work and permit a wide diversity within a traditional framework."

Adams also designed and built the Dr. William Morris office and house in Southville, Kentucky. Like the Gray House, the Morris house is a two-story clapboard house with a stone foundation. It was built around 1899 or 1900, and included a free-standing, one-story office building for Morris's medical practice. Adams lived across the street on Mt. Eden Road (Kentucky Route 53) in a Queen Anne inspired house that he designed in 1901.

In addition to the Dr. Morris office, Adams designed and built at least two other commercial structures in Southville, making him responsible for more than half of the commercial architecture in a focal crossroads in the early 20th century. Carris's Store is located at the corner of Kentucky Route 714 and Kentucky Route 53. Carriss's Feed Store is a clapboard, single-room retail building. Also attributed to Adams, the Carriss's Feed Store or Southville Feed Store is located on the corner of Kentucky Route 44 and Kentucky Route 55. Similar to Carriss's Store, Carriss's Feed Store is a clapboard, single-room retail building that dates to around 1915.

== Personal life ==
Adams was born in 1867 in Mercer County, Kentucky. He was the son of Sarah and Ebb Adams, a farmer in McAfee, Kentucky. Adams married Bettie Kate Shelburne of Southville on December 2, 1903, in Louisville, Kentucky. He was a member of the Presbyterian Church.

On November 19, 1941, Adams was admitted to Norton Infirmary in Louisville. He died there on December 8, 1941, at the age of 75 years. He was buried in Grove Hill Cemetery in Southville.

== Selected works ==
Building	Date	Location	Status	References
Dr. William Morris Office and House	c. 1899	Southville, Kentucky	National Register of Historic Places	
James W. Adams House	1901	Southville, Kentucky		
Gray House	1908	Shelbyville, Kentucky	National Register of Historic Places	
Carriss's Feed Store	c. 1915	Southville, Kentucky	National Register of Historic Places	
Carriss's Store	c. 1915	Southville, Kentucky	National Register of Historic Places	
