= National Register of Historic Places listings in Edmonson County, Kentucky =

Location of Edmonson County in Kentucky

This is a list of the National Register of Historic Places listings in Edmonson County, Kentucky.

This is intended to be a complete list of the properties and districts on the National Register of Historic Places in Edmonson County, Kentucky, United States. The locations of National Register properties and districts for which the latitude and longitude coordinates are included below, may be seen in a map.

There are 24 properties and districts listed on the National Register in the county.

This National Park Service list is complete through NPS recent listings posted June 6, 2025.

== Current listings ==
	Name on the Register	Image	Date listed	Location	City or town	Description
1	Asphalt Rock Pictographs (15ED24)		September 8, 1989 (#89001185)	Address Restricted	Asphalt	
2	Bransford Spring Pumphouse	Bransford Spring Pumphouse	May 8, 1991 (#91000493)	Mammoth Cave National Park; 37°12′05″N 86°04′37″W	Mammoth Cave	
3	Chalybeate Springs Hotel Springhouse		March 5, 2018 (#100002154)	2327 Chalybeate Rd. 37°07′35″N 86°14′06″W	Smiths Grove vicinity	
4	Colossal Cavern Entrance	Colossal Cavern Entrance	May 8, 1991 (#91000491)	Mammoth Cave National Park; 37°11′17″N 86°04′24″W	Mammoth Cave	
5	Crystal Cave District	Crystal Cave District	May 8, 1991 (#91000500)	Mammoth Cave National Park; 37°12′40″N 86°03′17″W	Mammoth Cave	
6	Dismal Rock Shelter Petroglyphs (15ED15)		September 8, 1989 (#89001184)	Address Restricted	Sweeden	
7	William Ford House	William Ford House	November 28, 1980 (#80001506)	South of Brownsville on U.S. Route 31W; 37°05′40″N 86°12′33″W	Brownsville	
8	Good Spring Baptist Church and Cemetery	Good Spring Baptist Church and Cemetery	May 8, 1991 (#91000498)	Mammoth Cave National Park; 37°12′32″N 86°08′53″W	Mammoth Cave	
9	Great Onyx Cave Entrance	Great Onyx Cave Entrance	May 8, 1991 (#91000490)	Mammoth Cave National Park; 37°13′08″N 86°04′41″W	Mammoth Cave	
10	Hercules and Coach No. 2	Hercules and Coach No. 2	October 10, 1975 (#75000160)	Off Kentucky Route 70 in Mammoth Cave National Park; 37°11′02″N 86°05′56″W	Mammoth Cave	
11	Joppa Baptist Church and Cemetery	Joppa Baptist Church and Cemetery	May 8, 1991 (#91000496)	Mammoth Cave National Park; 37°09′46″N 86°08′06″W	Mammoth Cave	
12	Maintenance Area District	Maintenance Area District	May 8, 1991 (#91000501)	Mammoth Cave National Park; 37°10′49″N 86°05′09″W	Mammoth Cave	
13	Mammoth Cave Baptist Church and Cemetery	Mammoth Cave Baptist Church and Cemetery	May 8, 1991 (#91000497)	Mammoth Cave National Park; 37°11′52″N 86°04′23″W	Mammoth Cave	
14	Mammoth Cave Historic District	Mammoth Cave Historic District	May 8, 1991 (#91000503)	Mammoth Cave National Park; 37°10′10″N 86°05′00″W	Mammoth Cave	
15	Maple Springs Ranger Station		May 8, 1991 (#91000494)	Mammoth Cave National Park; 37°12′26″N 86°07′56″W	Mammoth Cave	
16	Mill Hole Farm		May 22, 1978 (#78001311)	West of Park City off U.S. Route 31W; 37°06′38″N 86°06′50″W	Park City	
17	Mitchell-Estes Farmstead	Mitchell-Estes Farmstead	January 11, 1996 (#95001528)	1706 Upper Smiths Grove Rd. 37°04′36″N 86°11′29″W	Smiths Grove	Extends into Warren County
18	Old Guide Cemetery	Old Guide Cemetery	May 8, 1991 (#91000499)	Mammoth Cave National Park; 37°11′12″N 86°06′20″W	Mammoth Cave	
19	Reed-Dossey House	Reed-Dossey House	October 16, 1986 (#86002866)	Upper Main Cross and Jefferson Sts. 37°11′34″N 86°16′11″W	Brownsville	c.1890 house which served as a boarding house, and is very well-preserved
20	Residential Area District	Residential Area District	May 8, 1991 (#91000502)	Mammoth Cave National Park; 37°11′01″N 86°05′21″W	Mammoth Cave	
21	Salts Cave Archeological Site		May 15, 1979 (#79000278)	Address restricted	Munfordville	
22	Superintendent's House		May 8, 1991 (#91000495)	Mammoth Cave National Park; 37°11′03″N 86°05′11″W	Mammoth Cave	
23	Three Springs Pumphouse	Three Springs Pumphouse	May 8, 1991 (#91000492)	Mammoth Cave National Park; 37°11′45″N 86°04′59″W	Mammoth Cave	
24	Mathias Willis Store House		January 8, 1987 (#87000172)	Cummins Rd. 37°10′44″N 86°21′34″W	Windyville	

== See also ==
- National Register of Historic Places in Mammoth Cave National Park
- List of National Historic Landmarks in Kentucky
- National Register of Historic Places listings in Kentucky
