= Hutchcraft =

Hutchcraft is a surname. Notable people with the surname include:

- Hattie Hutchcraft Hill, née Harriet Hutchcraft (1847–1921), American artist
- Theo Hutchcraft (born 1986), English musician
