= Chalybeate Springs Hotel Springhouse =

- U.S. National Register of Historic Places
- Location within Kentucky Location within the United States
- Location: 2327 Chalybeate Rd., near Smiths Grove, Kentucky
- Coordinates: 37°07′35″N 86°14′06″W
- NRHP reference No.: 100002154
- Added to NRHP: March 5, 2018

The Chalybeate Springs Hotel Springhouse, near Smiths Grove, Kentucky, was listed on the National Register of Historic Places in 2018.

== See also ==
- Bransford Spring Pumphouse, also NRHP-listed in Edmonson County
- National Register of Historic Places listings in Edmonson County, Kentucky
