= Carriss's Feed Store =

- U.S. National Register of Historic Places
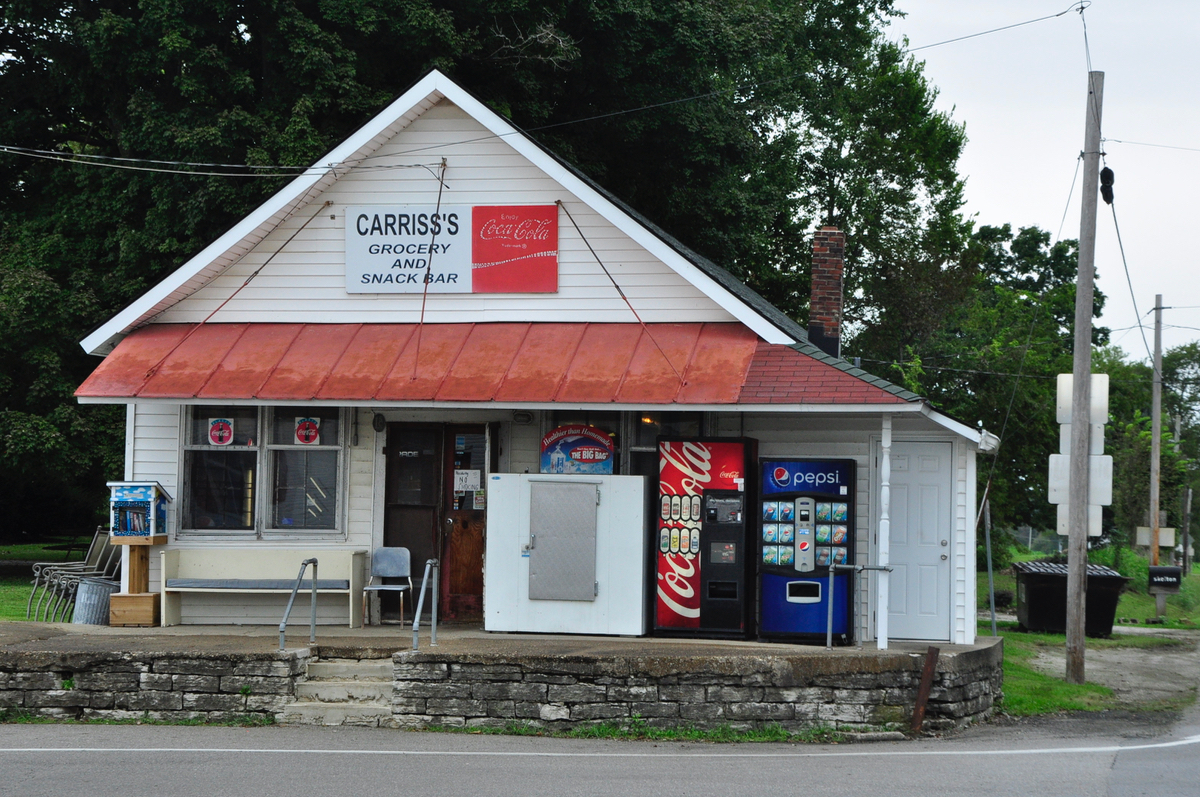
- This is an image of Carriss's Feed Store in Southville, Kentucky a place and building that's listed on the National Register of Historic Places in the United States of America. Its reference number is #88002897

- Location within Kentucky Location within the United States
- Location: KY 55 and KY 44, Southville, Kentucky
- Coordinates: 38°6′35″N 85°11′0″W
- Area: less than one acre
- Built: 1915
- Built by: Adams, James W.
- MPS: Shelby County MRA
- NRHP reference No.: 88002897
- Added to NRHP: December 27, 1988

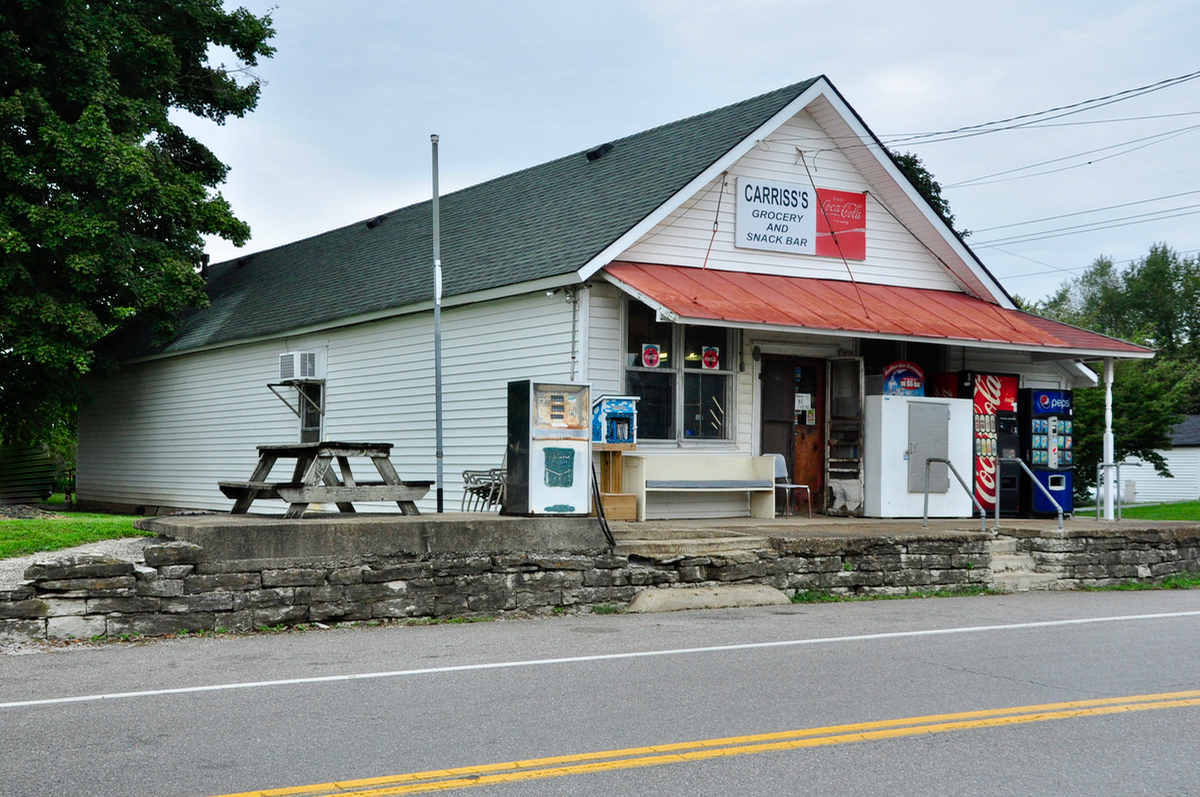
This is an image of Carriss's Feed Store in Southville, Kentucky a place and building that's listed on the National Register of Historic Places in the United States. Its reference number is #88002897

Carriss's Feed Store, located at KY 55 and KY 44 in Southville, Kentucky, was built in 1915. It is a work of James W. Adams. It has also been known as Southville Feed Store. It was listed on the National Register of Historic Places in 1988.
