= Bransford Spring Pumphouse =

- U.S. National Register of Historic Places
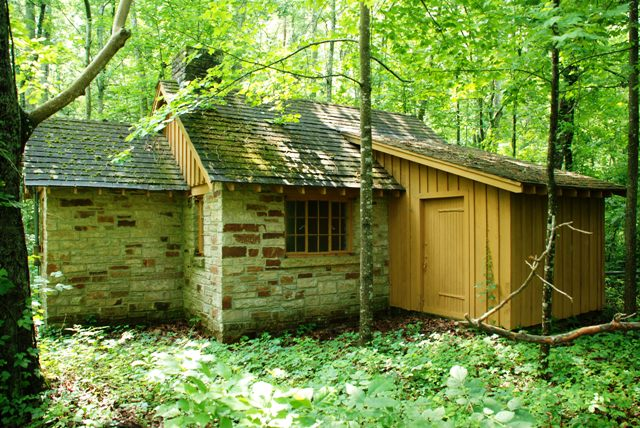

- Location within Kentucky Location within the United States
- Location: Mammoth Cave National Park, Mammoth Cave, Kentucky
- Coordinates: 37°12′05″N 86°04′37″W
- Area: less than one acre
- Built: 1939
- Built by: Civilian Conservation Corps
- Architectural style: NPS Rustic
- MPS: Mammoth Cave National Park MPS
- NRHP reference No.: 91000493
- Added to NRHP: May 8, 1991

The Bransford Spring Pumphouse, in Mammoth Cave National Park, in Mammoth Cave, Kentucky, was built in 1939. It was listed on the National Register of Historic Places in 1991. The listing included two contributing structures (the pumphouse and a cistern) and a contributing site (the spring).

The pumphouse is a one-story, two-room NPS Rustic-style building built of sandstone by the Civilian Conservation Corps.

== See also ==
- Chalybeate Springs Hotel Springhouse: Also in Edmonson County
- National Register of Historic Places listings in Edmonson County, Kentucky
