= African Cemetery No. 2 (Lexington, Kentucky) =

African American cemetery in Kentucky, US

- U.S. National Register of Historic Places
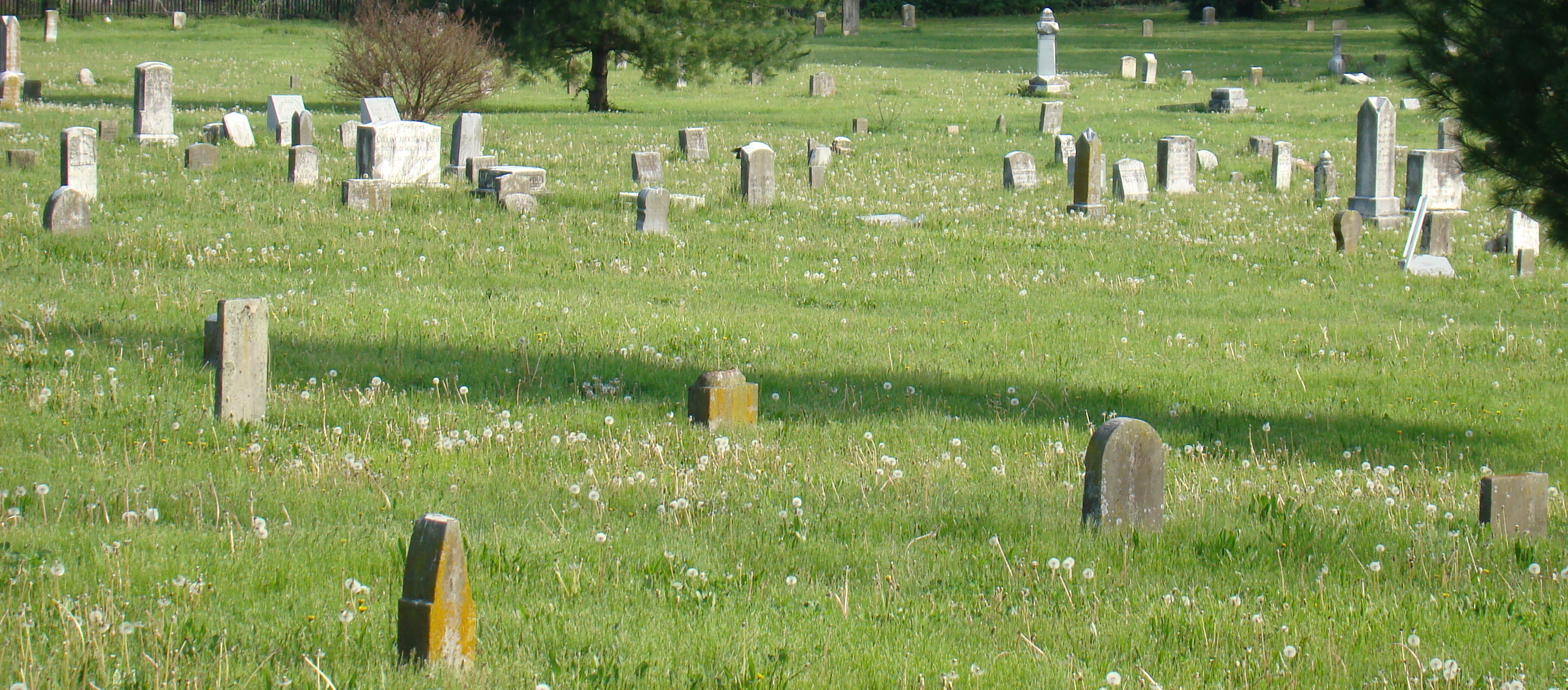
- African Cemetery No. 2

- Location within Kentucky Location within the United States
- Location: Lexington, Kentucky
- Coordinates: 38°3′00.5″N 84°28′41″W
- Area: 7.7 acres (3.1 ha)
- NRHP reference No.: 04000245
- Added to NRHP: March 31, 2004

African Cemetery No. 2, also known as The Cemetery of the Union Benevolent Society No. 2, is a historic burial site located in Lexington, Kentucky, United States.

== Founding and history ==
The first burials occurred on the property as early as the 1820s. The Colored Peoples Union Benevolent Society No. 2 purchased the property for use as a cemetery in 1869. The last burials in the cemetery took place in 1974.

In 1889, 300 bodies were moved from the Presbyterian Cemetery on Limestone Street to African Cemetery No. 2 under the supervision of C. O. H. Thomas.

In 1973, Lexington city government took control of the cemetery. In 1979, the African Cemetery No. 2, Incorporated was organized to save the cemetery.

In June 2003, a Kentucky Historical Highway Marker was placed on the site. The cemetery was added to the National Register of Historic Places on March 31, 2004.

== Burials ==
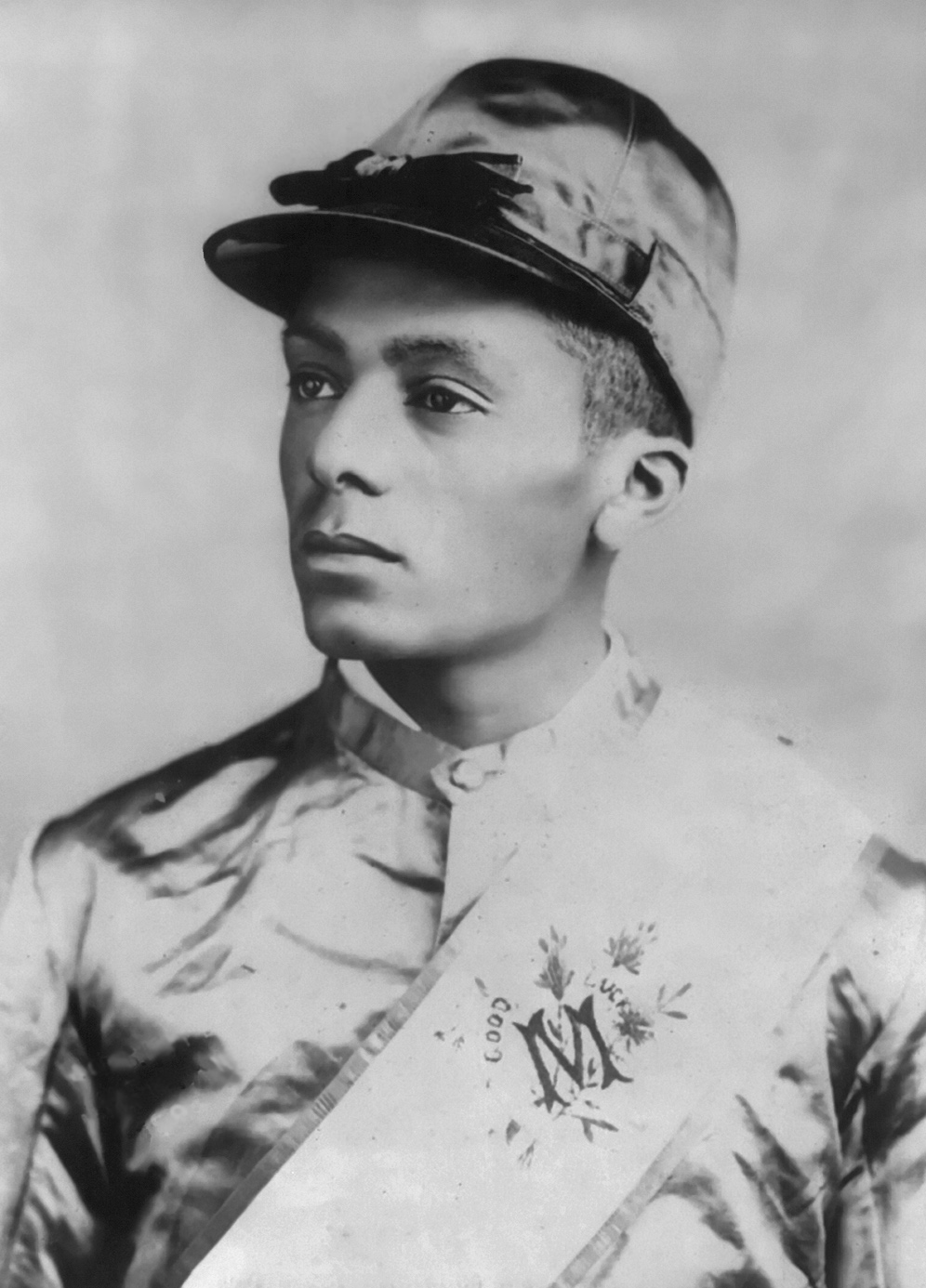
Isaac Murphy

The 7.7 acre (3.1 ha) cemetery contains more than 5,000 graves, of which 1,200 are identified, with fewer than 600 being recognized with markers.

Military veterans graves total 148, with 112 being U.S. Colored Troops of the American Civil War. About 80 of those veterans trained at nearby Camp Nelson, a Union supply depot and recruitment site. Of Kentucky's almost 24,000 U.S. Colored Troops, 10,000 trained at Camp Nelson. In addition to Kentucky, states represented among civil war veterans are New York, Massachusetts, Arkansas, and Tennessee.

Since 2005, Juneteenth Jubilee has been celebrated annually honoring Civil War veterans. An American flag is placed on each grave and every name is read aloud.

Veterans are also interred from the Buffalo Soldiers/Spanish-American War, 12; World War I, 18; and World War II, 4.

Clarence Espy was one of the soldiers who served with the 369th Infantry, the regiment which became known as the "Harlem Hell Fighters". Espy, a native of Lexington, was awarded the Croix de Guerre, France's highest military honor.

R. C. O. Benjamin, a journalist and an attorney, was murdered on October 2, 1900, during an altercation involving voting rights for African Americans. In 1910, a monument was dedicated at his grave site.

More than 150 graves are of those who worked in the equine occupations-trainers, jockeys, foremen, stablehands, and grooms. The range of birthdates, 1842 to 1897, and the dates of death, 1890 to 1932, indicate the prominence of African-Americans in a thriving horse and racing industry. Birthdates before 1866, show the likelihood that eight people were born enslaved.

Thoroughbred Racing Hall of Fame jockey, Isaac Burns Murphy, born 1861, was originally buried in African Cemetery No. 2. Murphy, the first jockey to win three Kentucky Derbys, died February 12, 1896, of pneumonia. In 1967, his remains were moved to the Man o' War gravesite off Russell Cave Road, and were moved again in 1987 to the Kentucky Horse Park.

The International Museum of the Horse, located at the Kentucky Horse Park, is collaborating with cemetery volunteers in creation of the Chronicle of African-Americans in the Horse Industry. This interactive educational website tells story of African-Americans and the role they played, and still play, in the horse industry. The museum also has a permanent exhibit, Black Horsemen of the Kentucky Turf, to celebrate the forgotten contributions of African Americans to the horse industry in Kentucky. Some of those featured in the exhibit are interred at the cemetery.

A documentary created by the cemetery's volunteer organization in conjunction with the Lexington Public Library is available at this link.

A cemetery map that notes individuals and sections is available here.

== Restoration ==
On April 4, 2002, volunteers from Canine Solutions International searched, mapped, and studied the physical grounds of the cemetery.

The approach to preserving the cemetery grave stones was the subject of a paper by M. Riegerta and A. Turkington. The paper published in Building and Environment discusses the "scientific knowledge of decay processes with conservation theory and the needs of stakeholders".

In 2012, the Lexington Public Library produced a documentary about the African Cemetery No. 2 and the restoration efforts.

== See also ==
- African American history
- Lexington in the American Civil War
- National Register of Historic Places listings in Fayette County, Kentucky
- Camp Nelson Heritage National Monument
- List of cemeteries in Kentucky
