= John O. Hodges =

American politician (1831–1897)

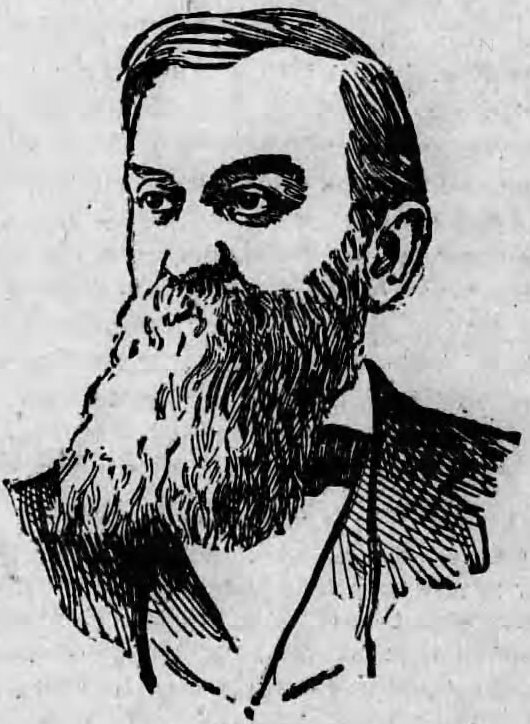
- Sketch of Hodges in an 1897 newspaper

Personal details
- Born: James Oden Hodges; December 17, 1831 Cynthiana, Kentucky, U.S.
- Died: August 19, 1897 (aged 65) Lexington, Kentucky, U.S.
- Resting place: Paris Cemetery
- Party: Democratic
- Spouse: Mary Messick (m. 1857)
- Children: 3
- Education: Centre College
- Occupation: Politician; lawyer; businessman; newspaperman

John Oden Hodges (December 17, 1831 – August 19, 1897) was an American politician from Kentucky. He served in the Kentucky Senate and was editor of the Sunday Observer paper in Lexington, Kentucky.

== Early life ==
John Oden Hodges was born on December 17, 1831, in Cynthiana, Kentucky. He graduated from Centre College in 1855. He read law for four years.

== Career ==
Hodges practiced law until 1857 when he moved to Illinois. He moved to Missouri in 1859. He joined the Confederate States Army.

In 1863, Hodges moved to Lexington, Kentucky. He operated a dry good business for 12 years there. He became associated with the Lexington Press. He remained with the paper until he established the Sunday Observer in 1880. He continued as editor of the Sunday Observer until the fall of 1896.

Hodges was a Democrat. He was superintendent of city schools. He was candidate for mayor of Lexington. In 1892, he was elected as a member of the Kentucky Senate. In 1896, he was a candidate for superintendent of public instruction, but lost the nomination to Ed Porter Thompson. In 1896, he announced his candidacy for the U.S. Congress, but subsequently withdrew from the race due to poor health.

== Personal life ==
In 1857, Hodges married Mary Messick of Danville. They had one son and two daughters, Arthur, Mary, and Harriett.

On August 14, 1897, Hodges had a lithotomy operation for kidney stones. He died several days later on August 19 at his home on Upper Street in Lexington. He was buried in Paris Cemetery.
