= John Dossey =

American mathematician (1944–2024)

- Born: John Arthur Dossey; March 15, 1944; Decatur, Illinois, U.S.
- Died: February 5, 2024 (aged 79); Tucson, Arizona, U.S.
- Education: Illinois State University; University of Illinois
- Occupation: Mathematician

John Arthur Dossey (March 15, 1944 – February 5, 2024) was an American mathematician.

== Life and career ==
Dossey was born in Decatur, Illinois, the son of Arthur and Mary Dossey. He attended Illinois State University, earning his BS degree in 1965 and his MS degree in 1968. He also attended the University of Illinois, earning his PhD degree in mathematics education in 1971.

Dossey served as a professor in the department of mathematics at Illinois State University from 1971 to 1999. During his years as a professor, in 1989, he was named a distinguished professor, and was awarded the NCTM Lifetime Achievement Award in 1996.

== Death ==
Dossey died on February 5, 2024, in Tucson, Arizona, at the age of 79.
