= St. John's Lutheran Cemetery =

- St John's Lutheran Cemetery
- U.S. National Register of Historic Places
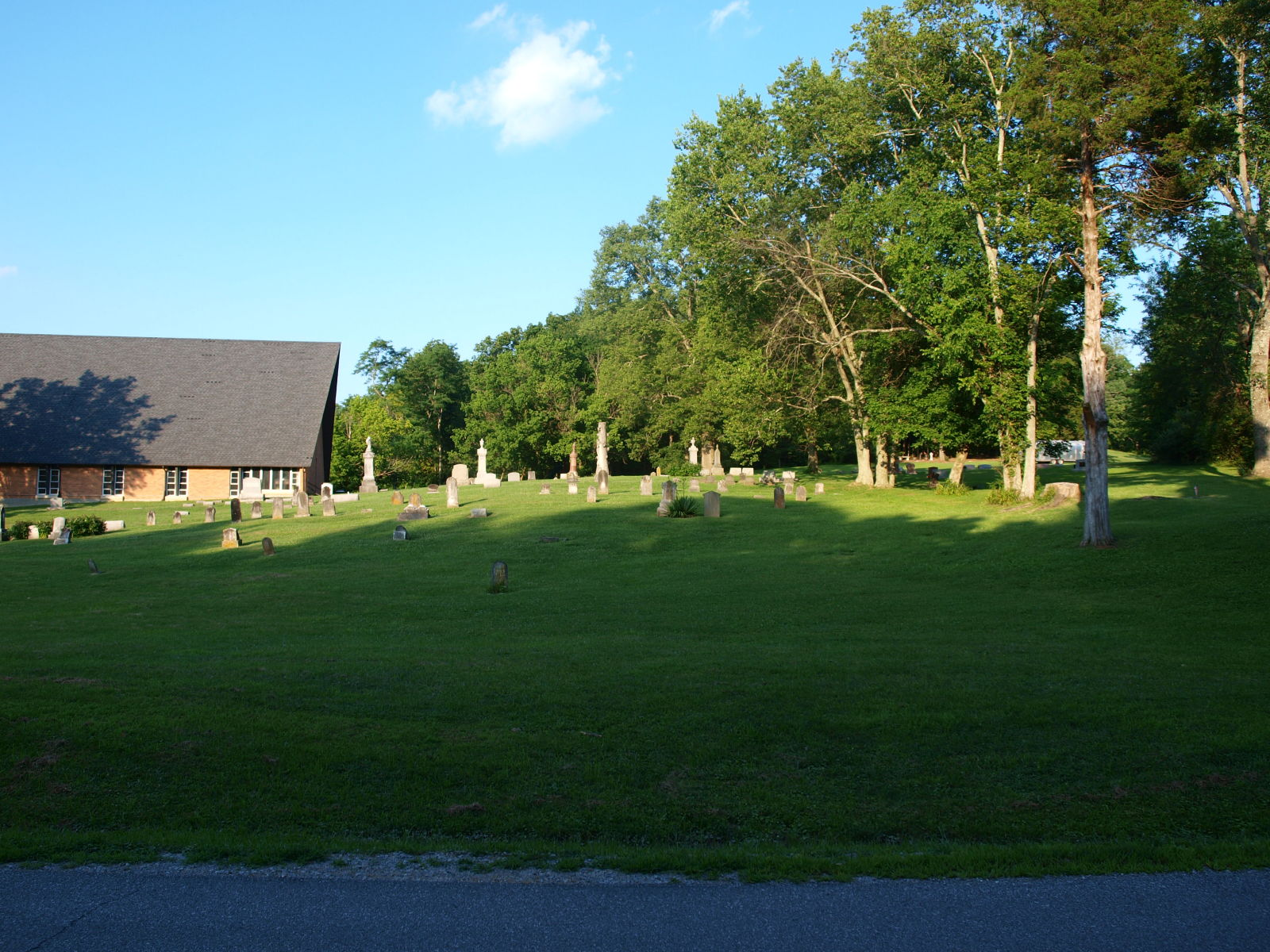

- Location within Kentucky Location within the United States
- Location: Upper Tug Fork Rd., near Alexandria, Kentucky
- Coordinates: 39°0′51″N 84°22′58″W
- Area: 1.4 acres (0.57 ha)
- MPS: German Settlement, Four Mile Creek Area TR
- NRHP reference No.: 83002617
- Added to NRHP: March 9, 1983

St John's Lutheran Cemetery is a historic Lutheran cemetery on Upper Tug Fork Road near Alexandria, Kentucky. It was added to the National Register of Historic Places in 1983.

It is the cemetery of St. John's Lutheran Church, which was established in 1860 and served German Lutherans in both in its Campbell County, Kentucky area and in southern Ohio.

The cemetery was deemed "significant as a place of interment for local German Protestants. It also contains a unique instance of German funerary folk art."
