= Hattie Hutchcraft Hill =

American artist

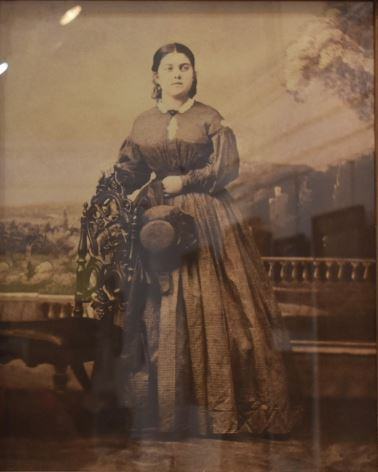
- Born: Harriet Amanda Hutchcraft; 27 April 1847; Bourbon County, Kentucky
- Died: 2 September 1921 (aged 74); Paris, Kentucky
- Resting place: Paris Cemetery
- Education: Académie Julian
- Known for: Painting

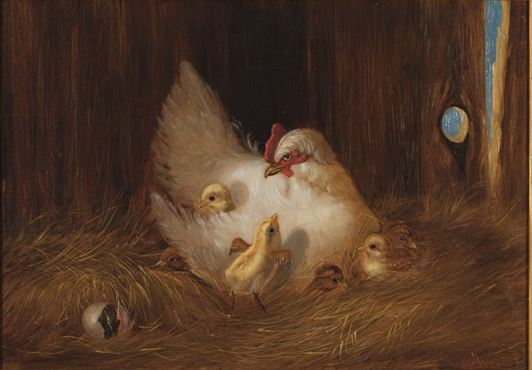
Mother Hen with Chicks

Hattie Hutchcraft Hill (April 27, 1847 – September 2, 1921) was an American artist from Paris, Kentucky who studied art and painted in Paris, France.

== Early life and education ==
Harriet Amanda Hutchraft was born to her parents, James and Elizabeth Hutchcraft, on April 27, 1847, in Bourbon County, Kentucky. She was the sixth of her parents' nine children. She married a man named William Hill from Illinois in 1866.

She visited the Paris World's Fair (the Exposition Universelle (1878)) with one of her sisters in 1878, which may have inspired or encouraged her ambitions to become a painter. In 1888, she returned to Europe, traveling through Italy, Spain, and France, where she met with the painter Rosa Bonheur, and in 1890, she settled in Paris and enrolled in art school at the Académie Julian, studying with Jean-Joseph Benjamin-Constant and Jules Joseph Lefebvre.

== Career as artist ==
Hill is most known for oil works, consisting mainly of still-life, portraits, landscapes, and marine pictures. She painted under the name "H. Hutchcraft Hill".

While in France, Hill exhibited in two Paris Salons. After returning to the United States, she maintained a portrait studio in Los Angeles from 1895 to 1898. Back at her home in Bourbon County, Kentucky, Hill became a prolific painter and china-painting teacher. She was a close friend of Sarah Bernhardt, of whom she painted a portrait. She painted a portrait series of Bourbon County judges, which hangs in the Bourbon County Courthouse. Hill lived, painted, and taught in Paris, Kentucky, until her death in 1921.
