= Joppa Baptist Church and Cemetery =

Historic church in Mammoth Cave National Park, Kentucky, United States

- U.S. National Register of Historic Places
- U.S. Historic district
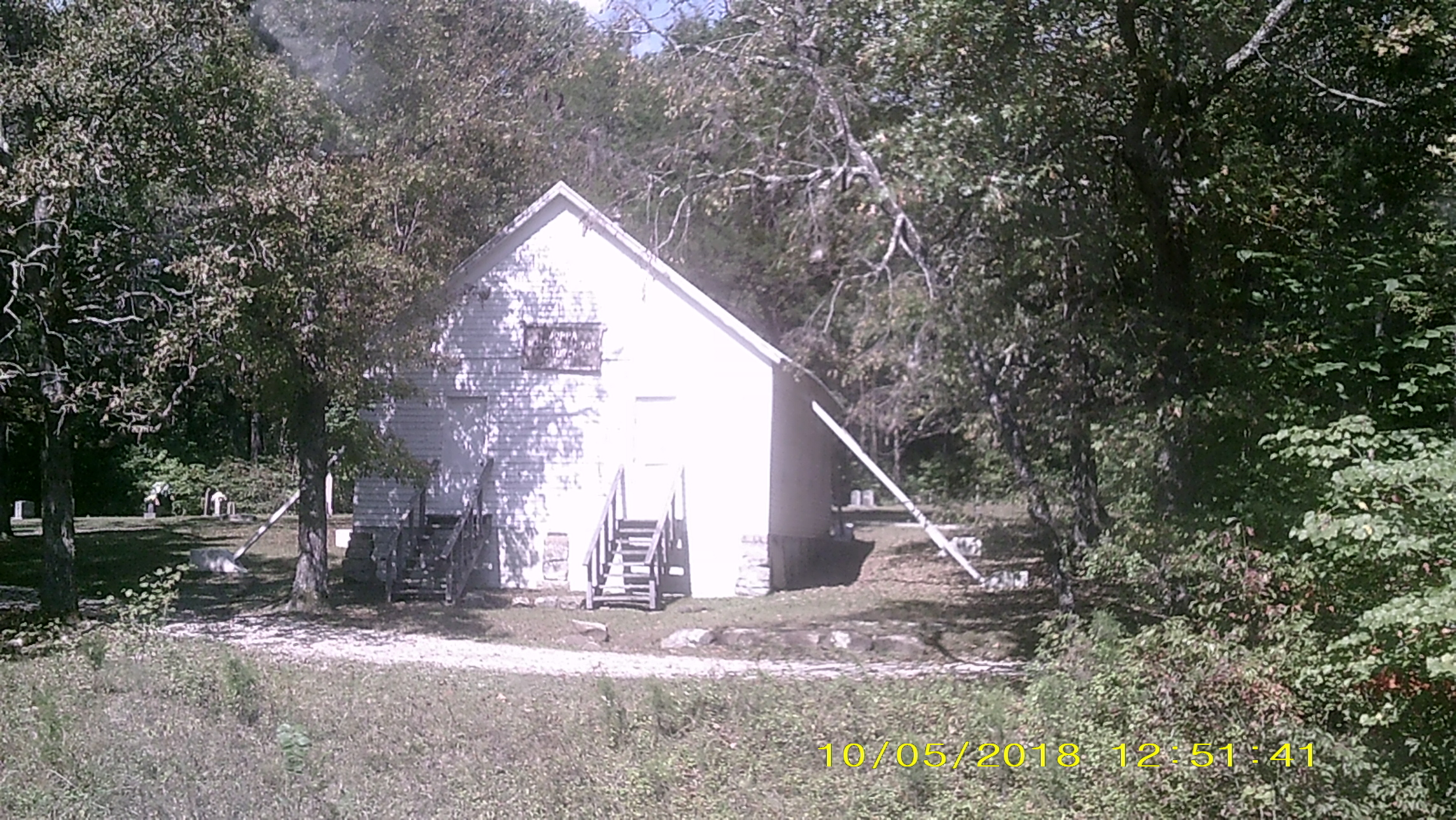

- Location within Kentucky Location within the United States
- Location: Mammoth Cave National Park, Mammoth Cave, Kentucky
- Coordinates: 37°09′46″N 86°08′07″W
- Area: less than one acre
- Built: c. 1900
- MPS: Mammoth Cave National Park MPS
- NRHP reference No.: 91000496
- Added to NRHP: May 8, 1991

Joppa Baptist Church and Cemetery is a historic church and cemetery in Mammoth Cave National Park in Kentucky. It was added to the National Register of Historic Places in 1991.

Joppa Baptist Church was established in 1861 and the present church was built in about 1900. The church is a one-story frame building on a sandstone block foundation. It is 40 by 29 feet (12.2 m × 8.8 m) in plan.

== See also ==
- Elko, Kentucky
- Good Spring Baptist Church and Cemetery: also in Mammoth Cave National Park
- Mammoth Cave Baptist Church and Cemetery: also in Mammoth Cave National Park
- National Register of Historic Places listings in Edmonson County, Kentucky
- National Register of Historic Places listings in Mammoth Cave National Park
