= Leslie Dossey =

Historian at Loyola University Chicago

Leslie Dossey is a historian specialising in late antique north Africa. She is associate professor of History at Loyola University Chicago.

== Education ==
Dossey received her PhD from Harvard University in 1998. Her doctoral thesis was entitled Christians and Romans: Aspiration, Assimilation, and Conflict in the North African Countryside.

== Research ==
Dossey published Peasant and Empire in Christian North Africa in 2010 with the University of California Press. The work was described by David L. Stone as 'a truly interdisciplinary and multi-scalar study' with 'a powerful thesis'. She has published on gender, religion, and the history of sleep in late antiquity.

== Bibliography ==
- “Wife Beating and Manliness in Late Antiquity.” Past & Present (2008) 3-40
- Peasant and Empire in Christian North Africa (California: University of California Press, 2010)
- 'Exegesis and dissent in Byzantine North Africa', North Africa Under Byzantium and Early Islam, ed. by Susan T. Stevens and Jonathan Conant (Washington, D.C.: Dumbarton Oaks Research Library and Collection, 2016)
- 'Watchful Greeks and Lazy Romans: Disciplining Sleep in late antiquity', Journal of Early Christian Studies 21, 2013 (2) 209–239
- 'Night in the Big City: Temporal Patterns in Antioch and Constantinople as Revealed by Chrysostom's Sermons', Revisioning John Chrysostom (Leiden: Brill, 2019)
