= Tompkinsville National Cemetery =

Former historic National Cemetery in Monroe County, Kentucky, US

Coordinates: 36.7029°N 85.6976°W

- Interactive map of Tompkinsville National Cemetery

Details
- Location: 2nd & Emberton Streets in Tompkinsville, Kentucky

The Tompkinsville National Cemetery was located on the corner of 2nd & Emberton Streets in Tompkinsville, Monroe County, Kentucky. The cemetery is known today as The Old Soldiers Cemetery. The old Civil War cemetery was marked with a Kentucky Historical Society Roadside Marker on July 9, 2012.

The information on the historical marker reads as follows:

Tompkinsville National Cemetery. In 1861, during the Civil War, land was donated by J.B. Evans for the burial of Union soldiers. By the end of the war, it contained 115 troops who died in this region. Due to small size the government ordered most soldiers moved to Nashville National Cemetery, 1867. With five graves left, it became public & no longer a national cemetery. Still known as "The Old Soldiers Cemetery".
