= Paris Cemetery =

Cemetery in Paris, Kentucky, United States

- Interactive map of Paris Cemetery

Details
- Established: January 30, 1847
- Location: Paris, Kentucky
- Country: United States
- Coordinates: 38°12′9″N 84°15′55″W
- Type: Public
- Style: Monumental
- Owned by: Paris Cemetery Company
- Find a Grave: Paris Cemetery
- The Political Graveyard: Paris Cemetery
- Paris Cemetery Gatehouse
- U.S. National Register of Historic Places
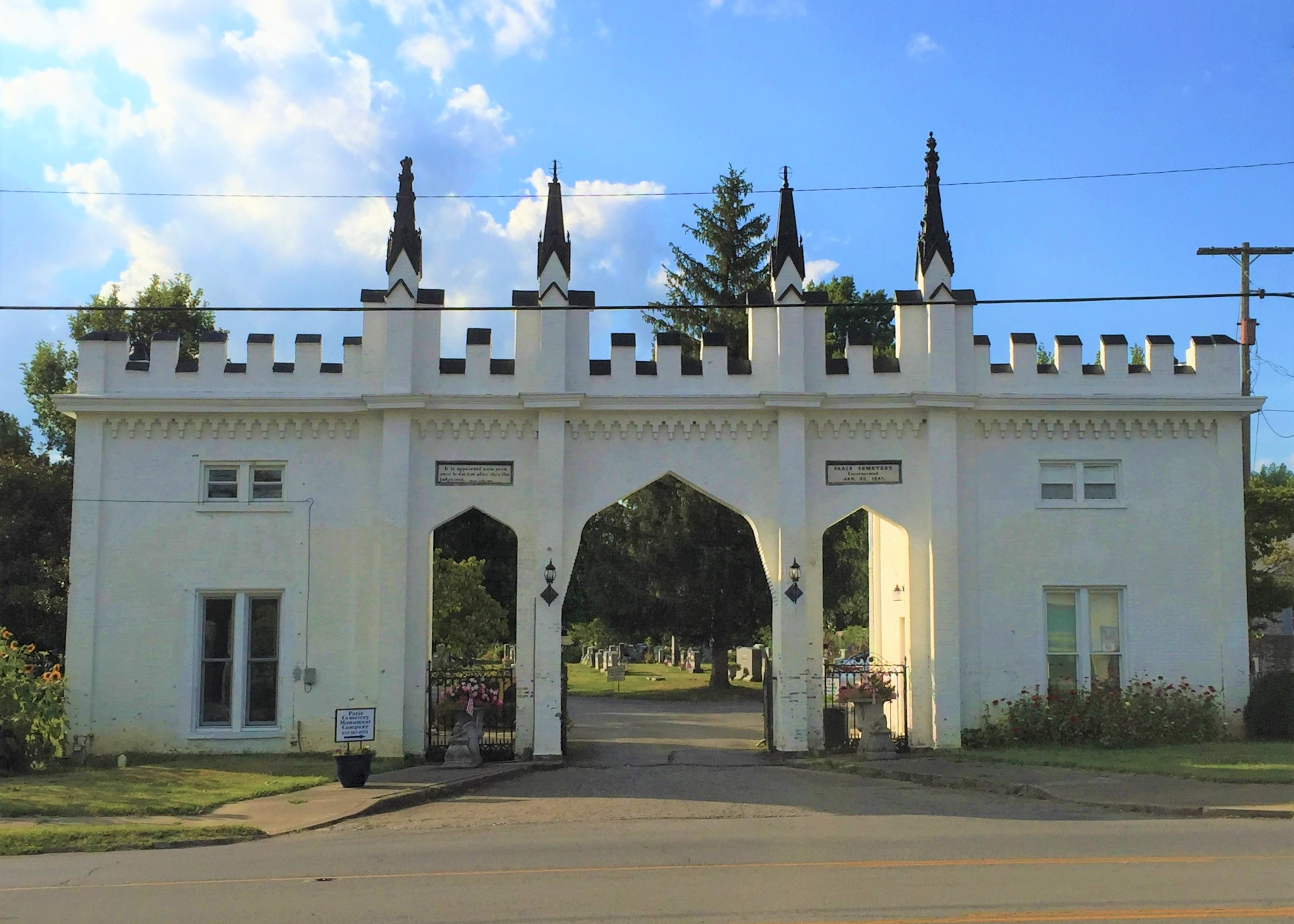
- Built: 1862
- Architect: John McMurtry
- Architectural style: Gothic Revival
- NRHP reference No.: 78001301
- Added to NRHP: November 24, 1978 (Property type: structure)
- Bourbon County Confederate Monument
- U.S. National Register of Historic Places
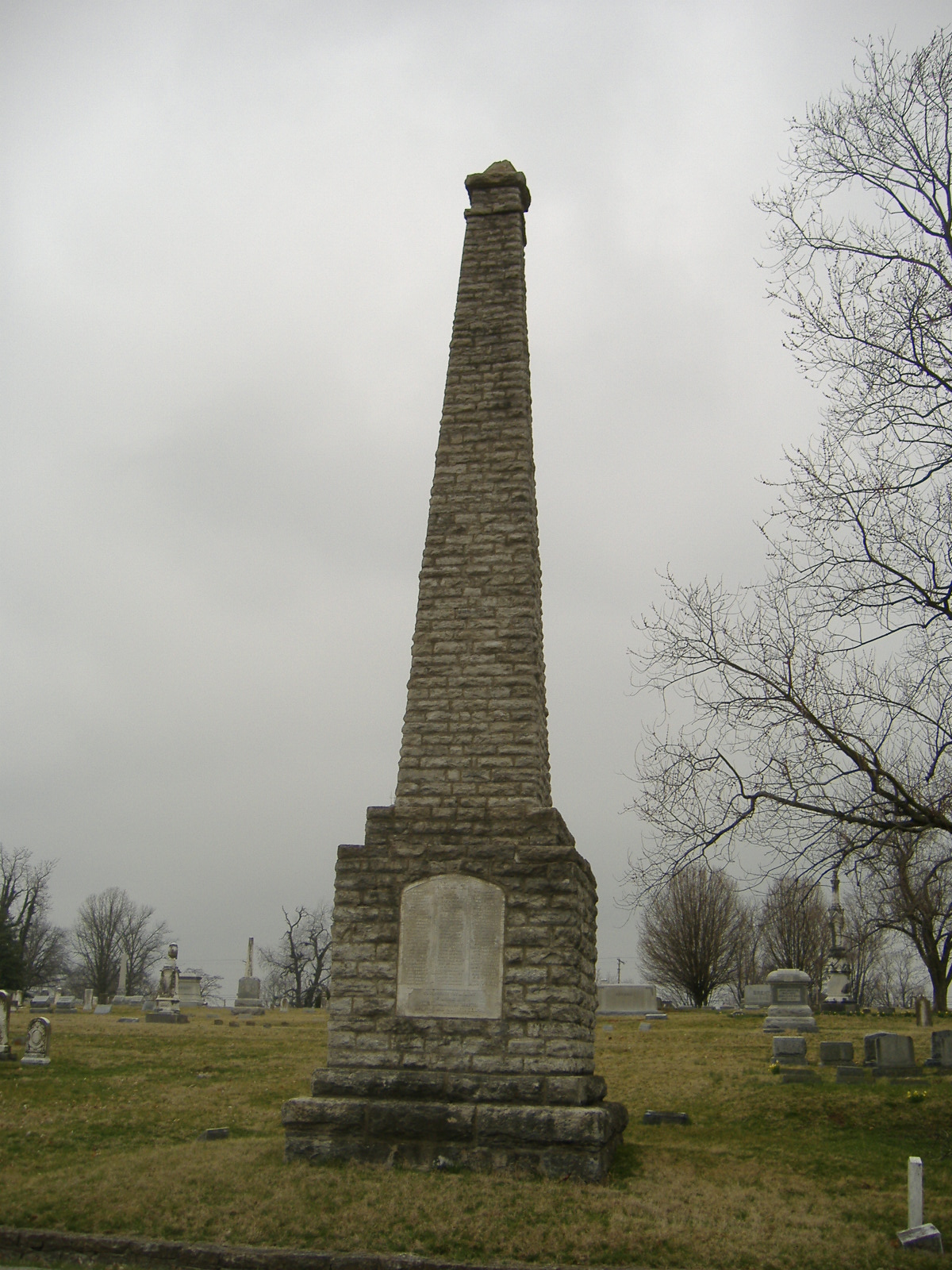
- Built: 1887
- Architectural style: Obelisk (chimney)
- MPS: Civil War Monuments of Kentucky
- NRHP reference No.: 97000719
- Added to NRHP: July 17, 1997 (Property type: object)

Paris Cemetery is located along South Main Street (US 68 Bus.) in Paris, Kentucky, United States. Incorporated on January 30, 1847, the cemetery is owned and operated by the Paris Cemetery Company. When it first opened, many families re-interred their dead in the new cemetery.

The cemetery is the burial place of many prominent Kentuckians, and includes the Bourbon County Confederate Monument and the Paris Cemetery Gatehouse, both of which are listed on the U.S. National Register of Historic Places. The Paris Cemetery gatehouse, made of granite, was placed on the National Register of Historic Places on November 24, 1978. Although the cemetery was founded in 1847, the gatehouse wasn't added until 1862, and was designed by architect John McMurtry. There are also monuments on the grounds honoring those from Bourbon County who fought in: the Mexican–American War; World War I; along with a combined World War II, Korean War, and the Vietnam War Memorial.

Many of the grave markers within the cemetery from the 19th and early 20th centuries are made of marble or similar materials. While not as durable as granite, the most commonly used stone today, marble's relative softness lends itself to more elaborate designs. Because of this, most of the more decorative monuments at the cemetery are carved from marble. There are several examples of Victorian Era angels in the cemetery, as well as numerous obelisks, both of which were popular grave monuments during the 19th century.

== Confederate Monument ==
The Bourbon County Confederate Monument, located in the middle of the cemetery, was built by the Confederate Monument Association in 1887. Like many monuments to the Confederate States of America in Kentucky, it is an obelisk, but is unique for being built like a chimney. The structure is made of mortared limestone, locally quarried, and the chimney is 30 feet (9.1 m) tall on a 10-foot-tall (3.0 m) base. On the front of the monument is a list of all those from Bourbon County who died fighting for the Confederacy in the Civil War; and on the rear is a list of those serving the Confederacy from other states who died in Bourbon County during the war, as well as a list of Confederates who died in Bourbon County after the war.

On July 17, 1997, it was one of sixty-one different monuments to the Civil War in Kentucky placed on the National Register of Historic Places, as part of the Civil War Monuments of Kentucky Multiple Property Submission.

== Notable people ==
- Bill Arnsparger (1926–2015), NFL and college football coach.
- Virgil Chapman (1895–1951), represented Kentucky in the U.S. House of Representatives and in the U.S. Senate.
- Ezekiel F. Clay (1840–1920), Confederate colonel
- Blanton Collier (1906–1983), NFL and college football coach.
- John T. Croxton (1836–1874), brigadier general in the Union Army during the Civil War, and later U.S. Minister to Bolivia.
- Garrett Davis (1801–1872), represented Kentucky in the U.S. House and in the U.S. Senate.
- John Fox Jr. (1862–1919), journalist, short story writer and novelist.
- Arthur B. Hancock (1875–1957), breeder of Thoroughbred racehorses who established Claiborne Farm.
- Arthur B. Hancock Jr. (1910–1972), breeder of thoroughbred racehorses.
- Richard Hawes (1797–1877), represented Kentucky in the U.S. House and served as the second Confederate governor of Kentucky.
- Basil Hayden (1899–2003), college basketball player and coach.
- Hattie Hutchcraft Hill (1847–1921), artist most known for her still-life, portrait, landscape and marine oil works.
- John O. Hodges (1831–1897), member of the Kentucky Senate
- Alexander D. Orr (1761–1835), first representative from Kentucky's 2nd congressional district following the commonwealth's admission to the Union.
- Edward F. Simms (1871–1938), lawyer and industrialist
- William E. Simms (1822–1898), represented Kentucky in the U.S. House and then as senator in the Confederate States Congress.
- Robert Trimble (1776–1828), Associate Justice of the Supreme Court of the United States.

== See also ==
- List of burial places of justices of the Supreme Court of the United States
