= Southville, Kentucky =

Unincorporated community in Kentucky, United States

- Unincorporated community
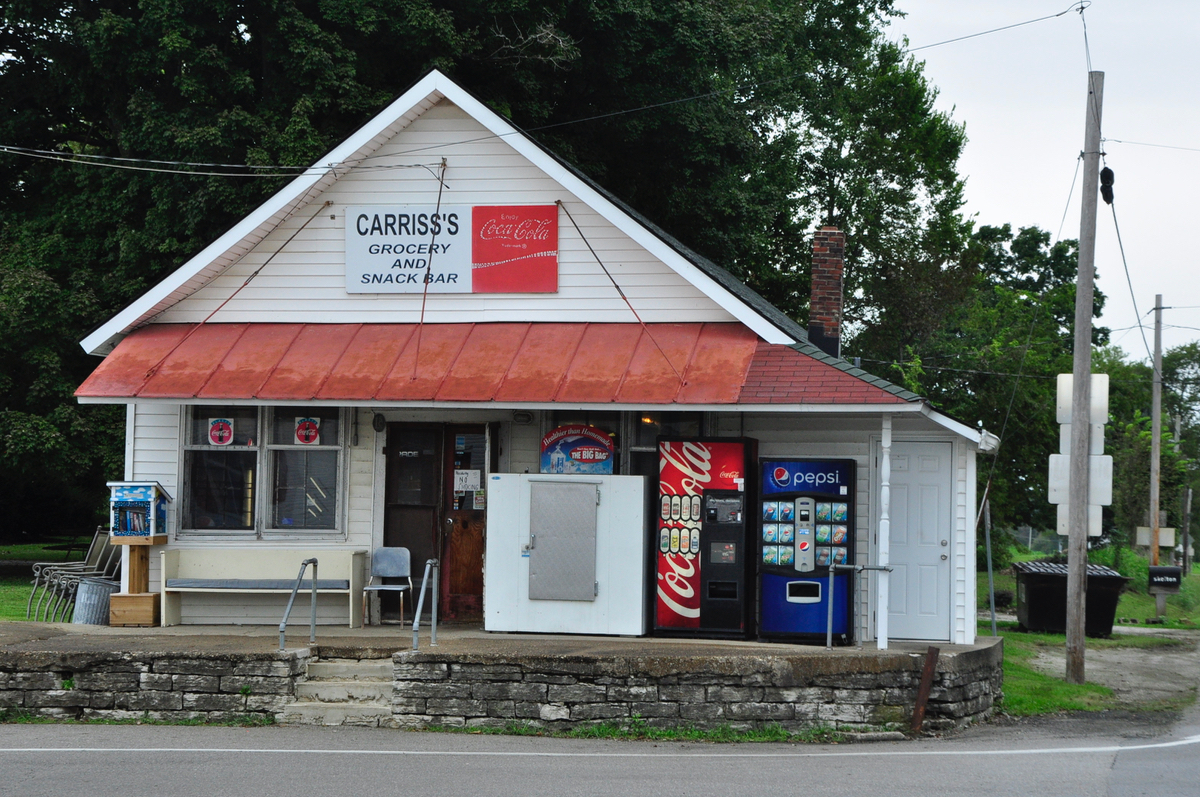
- Carriss's Feed Store

- Location within Kentucky
- Coordinates: 38°06′36″N 85°10′55″W
- Country: United States
- State: Kentucky
- County: Shelby
- Elevation: 820 ft (250 m)
- Time zone: UTC-5 (Eastern (EST))
  - Summer (DST): UTC-4 (EDT)
- Area code: 502
- GNIS feature ID: 504010

Southville, Kentucky is an unincorporated community in Shelby County, Kentucky. It is the location of, or nearest community to, several places listed on the National Register of Historic Places:

- Carriss's Feed Store, built in 1915, at KY 55 and KY 44, Southville, (Adams, James W.), NRHP-listed
- Carriss's Store, KY 714 and KY 53, Southville, (Adams, James W.), NRHP-listed
- Dr. William Morris Office and House, KY 53, Southville, (Adams, James W.), NRHP-listed
