= Good Spring Baptist Church and Cemetery =

Historic church in Kentucky, United States

- U.S. National Register of Historic Places
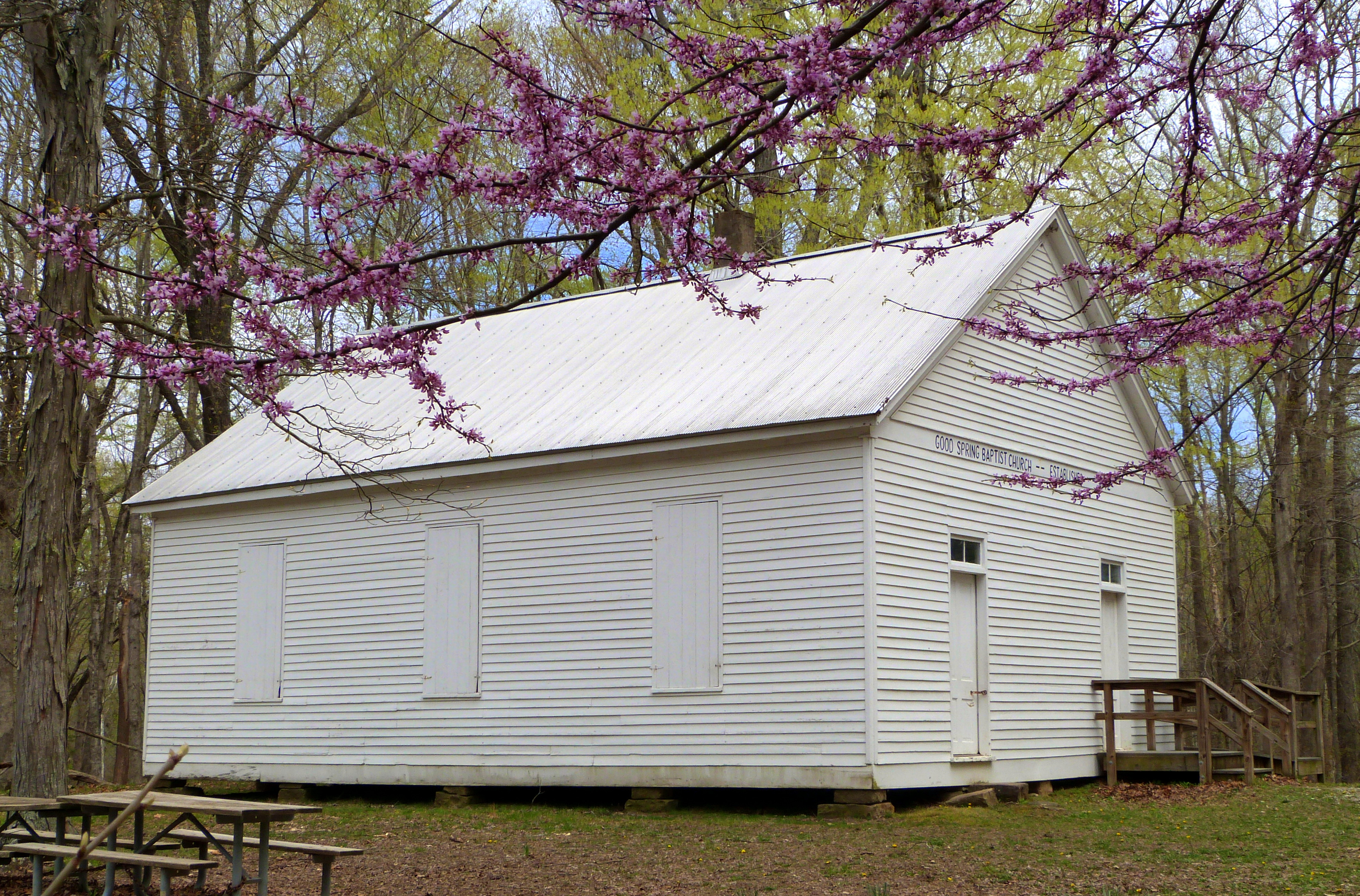
- Good Spring Baptist Church in 2013. The cemetery is off the photo to the left.

- Location within Kentucky Location within the United States
- Location: Mammoth Cave National Park, Kentucky
- Coordinates: 37°12′32″N 86°8′53″W
- Area: 2 acres (0.81 ha)
- Built: 1900
- MPS: Mammoth Cave National Park MPS
- NRHP reference No.: 91000498
- Added to NRHP: May 08, 1991

Good Spring Baptist Church and Cemetery is a historic church and cemetery mainly for the descendants within and outside of what now is called Mammoth Cave National Park and is formally located in Edmonson County, Kentucky.

== History ==
The Church at Good Spring was organized in the year 1842 on the third Saturday in February by Elders Jesse Moon, R.T. Gardner and William Skaggs with the following members: Brown Blair, Mary Blair, Isaac Blair, Lucy Blair, David Blair, Betsy Blair, J.L. Smith, Sarah Smith, Rachel Pace, William Skaggs, J.D. Sanders, Sally Sanders, Thomsas Meredith, Esaline Smith and Pega Davis. An entry, made in the Beaver Dam Church Book in March 1842, lists some of the names that went to Good Spring from that church:

"A petitioning letter from members... naimely (sic) Henry B. Blair and Mary (wife) and sister Rachel Pearce (sic) for letters of dismission which was granted for ministerial aid for the purpose of being constituted into a church to themselves for convenient sake for which is granted and sent to their aid Elder Jesse Moon... "

The members of Good Spring, before it was formed, had to travel to Rhoda to attend church at Beaver Dam, or go to Nolin Baptist Church. Due to the distance and conditions of travel at that time, they thought it expedient to form a church of their own.

Aunt Susan Blair was born in the heart of the Forks in the middle of the decade preceding the Civil War and grew to young womanhood there. In a letter written to Charlie Whittle in 1931, she paints a picture of the conditions that existed around Good Spring Church in the olden days, "On Sunday we went to church were Good Spring Church now stands. The old house was built of logs and heated with a fire place. My father and the neighbors built it in 1842; and my father and mother were among the first members there. The first preacher I can remember was Uncle Billy Skaggs (William Skaggs). When they had a revival meeting, everybody came and stayed all day. Some would bring the dinner one day and others the next. There were no night services. Sometimes there would be more than the church house would hold; and then they held the service out under the trees. The older women wore homespun, yarn dresses and hats tied with a ribbon under their chins. I was fourteen years old before I had my first pair of dress shoes; and I had to carry them in my hand until I was nearly to the church and then sit down and put them on. When I started home, I had to pull them off and carry them, for they had to last me for three or four years, or until they were too small for me."

Many of the charter members of this old church were descendants and-or the living existence of the pioneer Baptists who settled Green County and associated with the Brush Creek Church and settlement. Elder William Skaggs married first Lindsey Meredith, a daughter of Joseph Meredith, Sr., who was traveling from Green County. Joseph was the father of Thomas Meredith, a charter member of Good Spring Church. The Sanders family also came from Brush Creek area of Green County at an early date. The Blairs came to Edmonson County from the Cumberland River area of Tennessee.

Good Spring Church was a flourishing and a prosperous church until the Government ambushed the establishment of Mammoth Cave National Park. The church property was acquired by the National Park Service and the church dissolved. The building is currently still standing and each year descendants of the pioneers who worshipped there return for their yearly home-coming and dinner on the grounds of what used to be.

Good Spring Church had the largest membership of any church in the Green River Association from 1896 to 1900.

In 1842, the church was built and kicked off the cave's history of offering beautiful views, and in 1991 was opened up to the public after being listed in the National Register of Historic Places NRHP.

== See also ==
- Joppa Baptist Church and Cemetery: also in Mammoth Cave National Park
- Mammoth Cave Baptist Church and Cemetery: also in Mammoth Cave Baptist Church and Cemetery
- National Register of Historic Places listings in Edmonson County, Kentucky
- National Register of Historic Places listings in Mammoth Cave National Park
- National Register of Historic Places listings in Kentucky
