= Mammoth Cave Baptist Church and Cemetery =

Historic site in Mammoth Cave National Park

- U.S. National Register of Historic Places
- U.S. Historic district
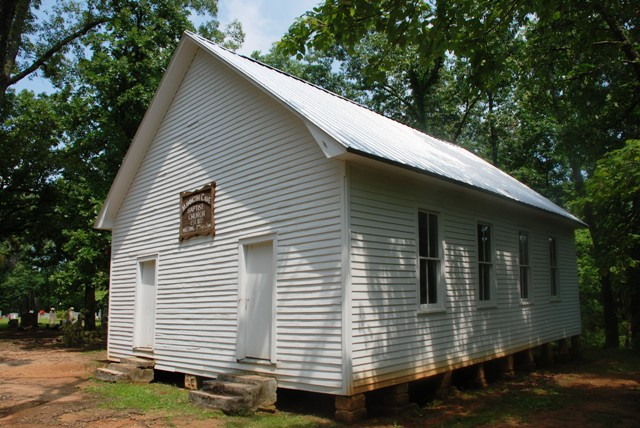

- Location within Kentucky Location within the United States
- Location: Mammoth Cave National Park, Mammoth Cave, Kentucky
- Coordinates: 37°11′52″N 86°04′23″W
- Area: 1.5 acres (0.61 ha)
- Built: 1927
- MPS: Mammoth Cave National Park MPS
- NRHP reference No.: 91000497
- Added to NRHP: May 8, 1991

Mammoth Cave Baptist Church and Cemetery is a historic church in Mammoth Cave National Park in Kentucky. It was built in 1827 and added to the National Register of Historic Places in 1991.

The church was established in 1827. The current building was built in 1927 after the original was destroyed in a tornado. It is a 42 by 26 feet (12.8 m × 7.9 m) one-story gable-front frame building, on a foundation of stacked sandstone blocks.

== Notable burials ==
- Floyd Collins (1887–1925), cave explorer and famous cave accident victim

== See also ==
- Good Spring Baptist Church and Cemetery: also in Mammoth Cave National Park
- Joppa Baptist Church and Cemetery: also in Mammoth Cave National Park
- National Register of Historic Places listings in Edmonson County, Kentucky
- National Register of Historic Places listings in Mammoth Cave National Park
