= Reed-Dossey House =

- U.S. National Register of Historic Places
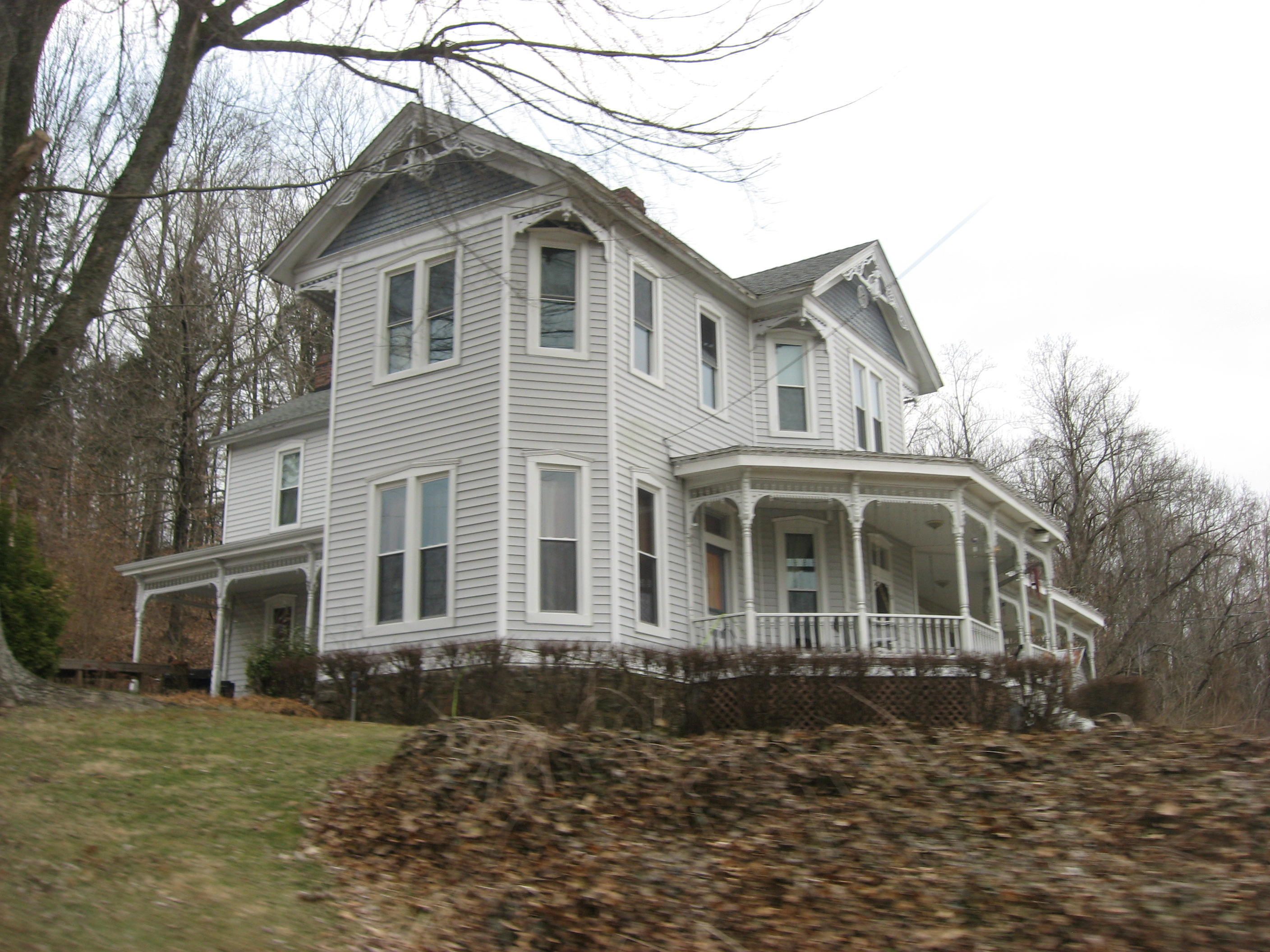

- Location within Kentucky Location within the United States
- Location: Upper Main Cross and Jefferson Sts., Brownsville, Kentucky
- Coordinates: 37°11′34″N 86°16′11″W
- Area: 0.3 acres (0.12 ha)
- Built: c.1890
- Architectural style: Late Victorian, Vernacular Late Victorian
- NRHP reference No.: 86002866
- Added to NRHP: October 16, 1986

The Reed-Dossey House, in Brownsville, Kentucky, is a historic house built around 1890. It was listed on the National Register of Historic Places in 1986.

It is a balloon-frame house with a two-story T-plan, plus a one-story wing.

It was deemed notable "as an unusually large and intact example of vernacular late Victorian architecture in a small town in western Kentucky" with well-preserved interior and exterior details.

The house was built by/for entrepreneur J.P. Reed, who was "reputedly connected with the steamboat traffic on the Green River" and it is believed that Reed intended for the house to be a hotel or boarding house. The house was later operated by the Dossey family as a boarding house; Miss Tandie Mclntyre, a local schoolteacher was a notable boarder.
