= Grove Hill Cemetery Chapel =

Historic site in Shelby County, Kentucky

- U.S. National Register of Historic Places
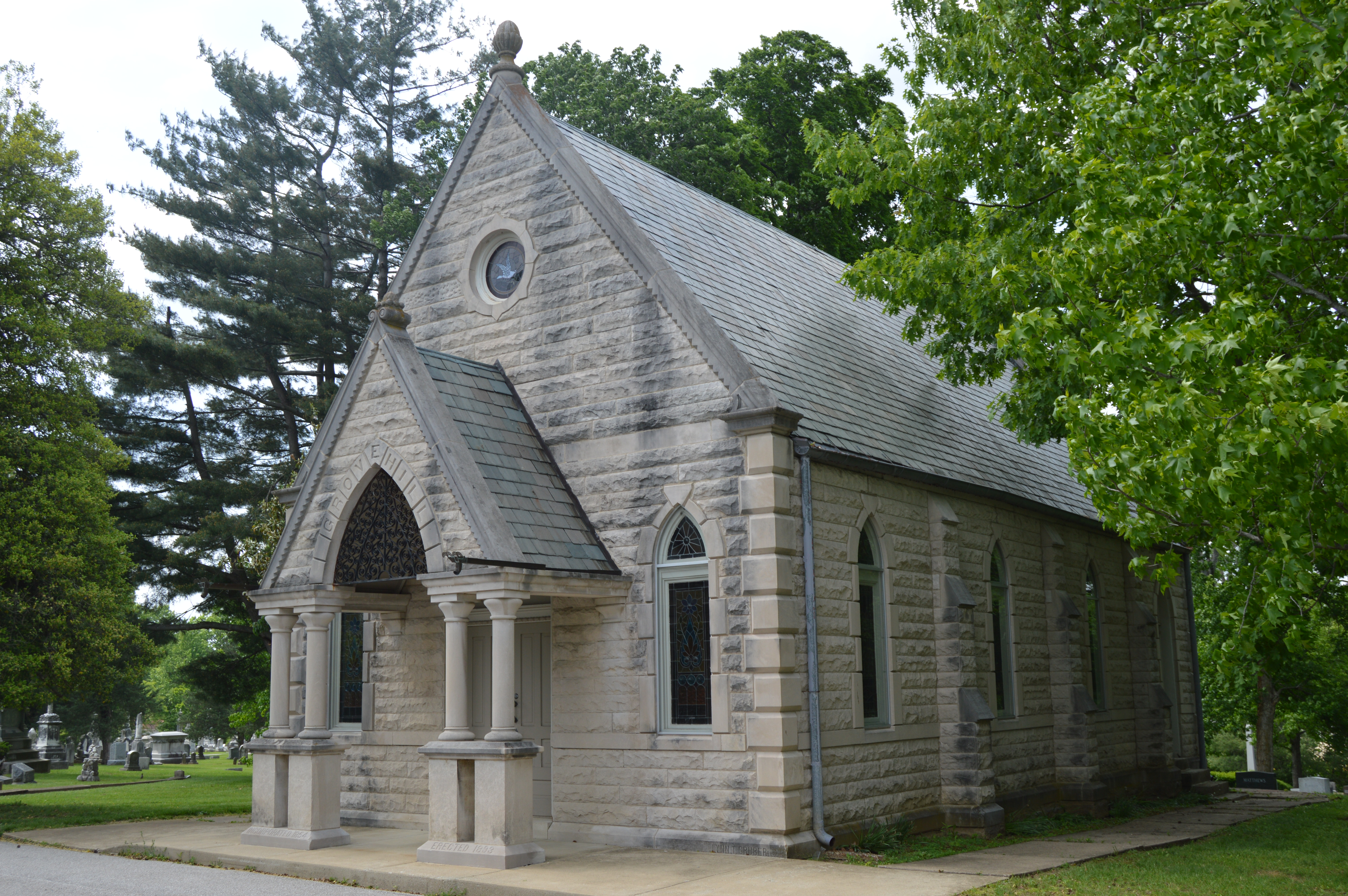

- Location within Kentucky Location within the United States
- Nearest city: Shelbyville, Kentucky
- Coordinates: 38°12′23″N 85°12′35″W
- Area: 0.1 acres (0.040 ha)
- Built: 1895
- Built by: Lynn T. Gruber
- Architectural style: Gothic Revival
- MPS: Shelby County MRA
- NRHP reference No.: 88002922
- Added to NRHP: December 27, 1988

The Grove Hill Cemetery Chapel, in Grove Hill Cemetery near Shelbyville, Kentucky was built in 1893. It was listed on the National Register of Historic Places in 1988.

It is a limestone ashlar building, designed and built by local builder Lynn T. Gruber in Gothic Revival style.

It is located south of Shelbyville at Clear Creek.
