= Confederate Monument in Perryville =

- U.S. National Register of Historic Places
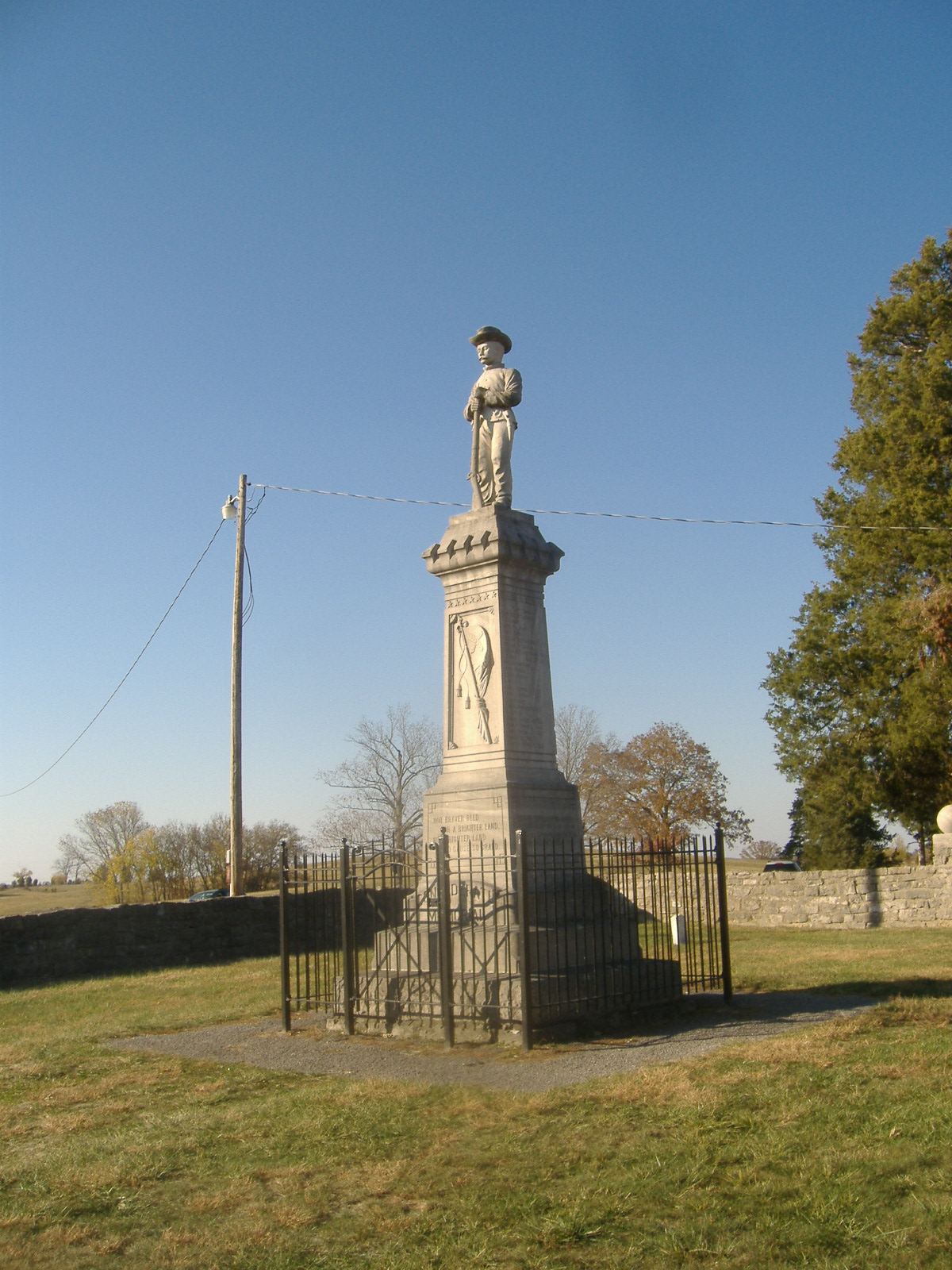

- Location within Kentucky Location within the United States
- Nearest city: Perryville, Kentucky
- Built: 1902
- Architect: Peter-Burghard Statue Company, Louisville, KY
- MPS: Civil War Monuments of Kentucky MPS
- NRHP reference No.: 97000722
- Added to NRHP: July 17, 1997

The Confederate Monument in Perryville is a historic monument located by the visitor center of the Perryville Battlefield State Historic Site, in the vicinity of Perryville, Kentucky, in Boyle County, Kentucky, USA. It was built in 1902, forty years after the Battle of Perryville, the bloodiest battle in Kentucky history, on October 8, 1862. In total, 532 Confederates died at the battle, but it is unknown how many of this number are buried here. A small cemetery is by the monument; local farmers had to bury the Confederate dead as the Confederate Army, despite a tactical victory, had to leave Perryville quickly, and hogs were beginning to feast on the soldiers' remains.

The monument features a 6-foot (2 m) tall limestone Confederate soldier atop a three-tier limestone pedestal base. It was constructed by the Peter-Burghard Statue Company of Louisville, Kentucky. Names of 37 Confederate dead are on the monument, as are four passages from the Bivouac of the Dead. It also notes that 470 unknown Confederates died from the battle as well. The total boundary area for the National Register entry concerning the Confederate Monument is a 12-foot (3.7 m) radius surrounding the monument.

The monument was built for the 40th anniversary of the Battle of Perryville by the government of Kentucky. When dedicated, a crowd of 5,000 to 10,000 attended the ceremony on October 8, 1902, according to the October 10, 1902, edition of the Danville News.

On July 17, 1997, the Confederate Monument in Perryville was one of sixty different monuments related to the Civil War in Kentucky placed on the National Register of Historic Places, as part of the Civil War Monuments of Kentucky Multiple Property Submission. Three other monuments on this Multiple Property Submission are or were also in Boyle County. One of them, the Union Monument in Perryville, is also by the visitor center of the Perryville Battlefield State Historic Site, a few yards north of the Confederate Monument. The Unknown Confederate Dead Monument in Perryville is a mile away on private land at the Goodknight Cemetery. Both of the preceding monuments were built much later, both in or around 1928; twenty-six years later. The other was formerly in downtown Danville, Kentucky, but is now in Brandenburg, Kentucky: the Confederate Monument in Danville.

== Gallery ==
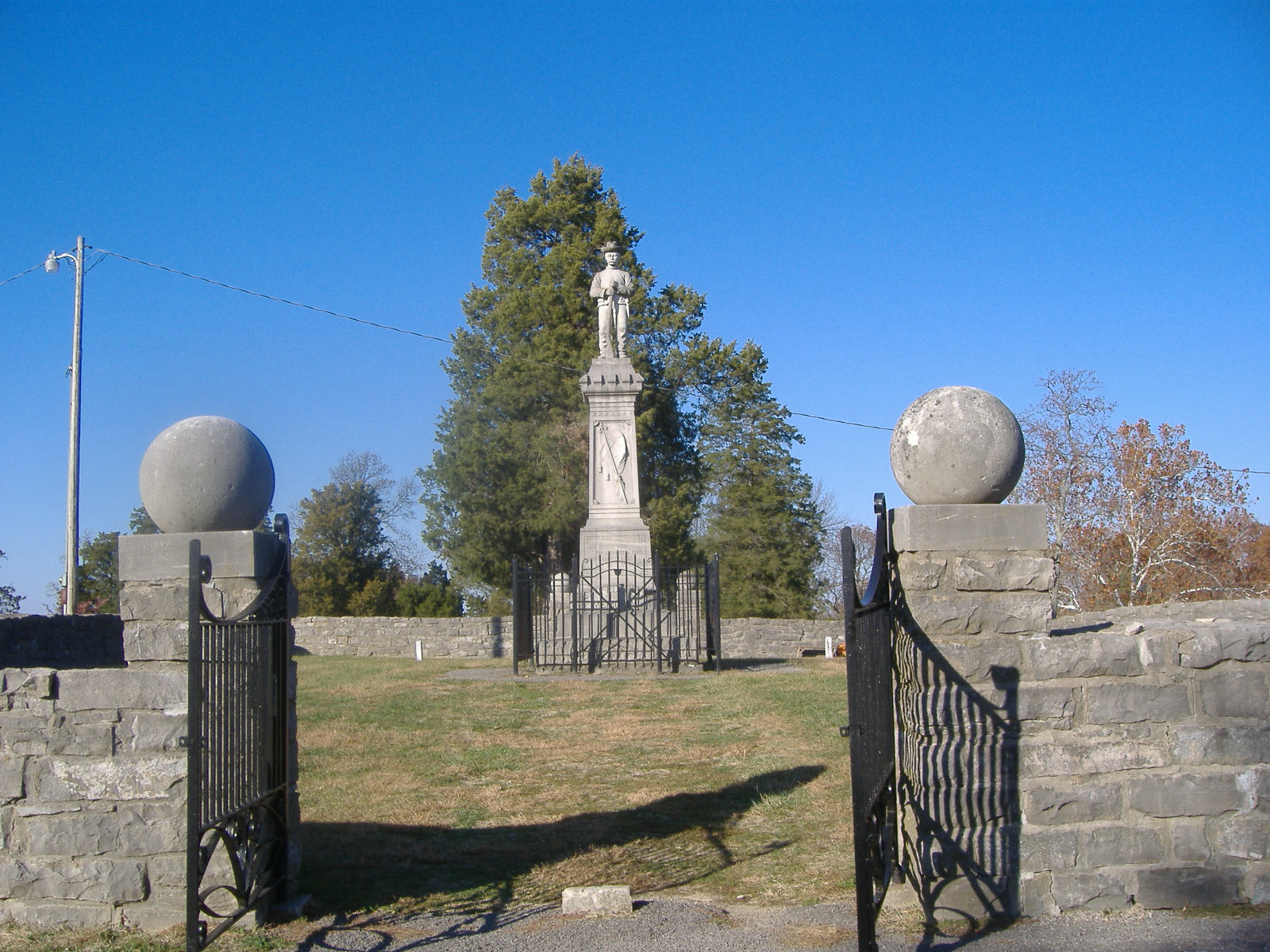
Front view of the monument

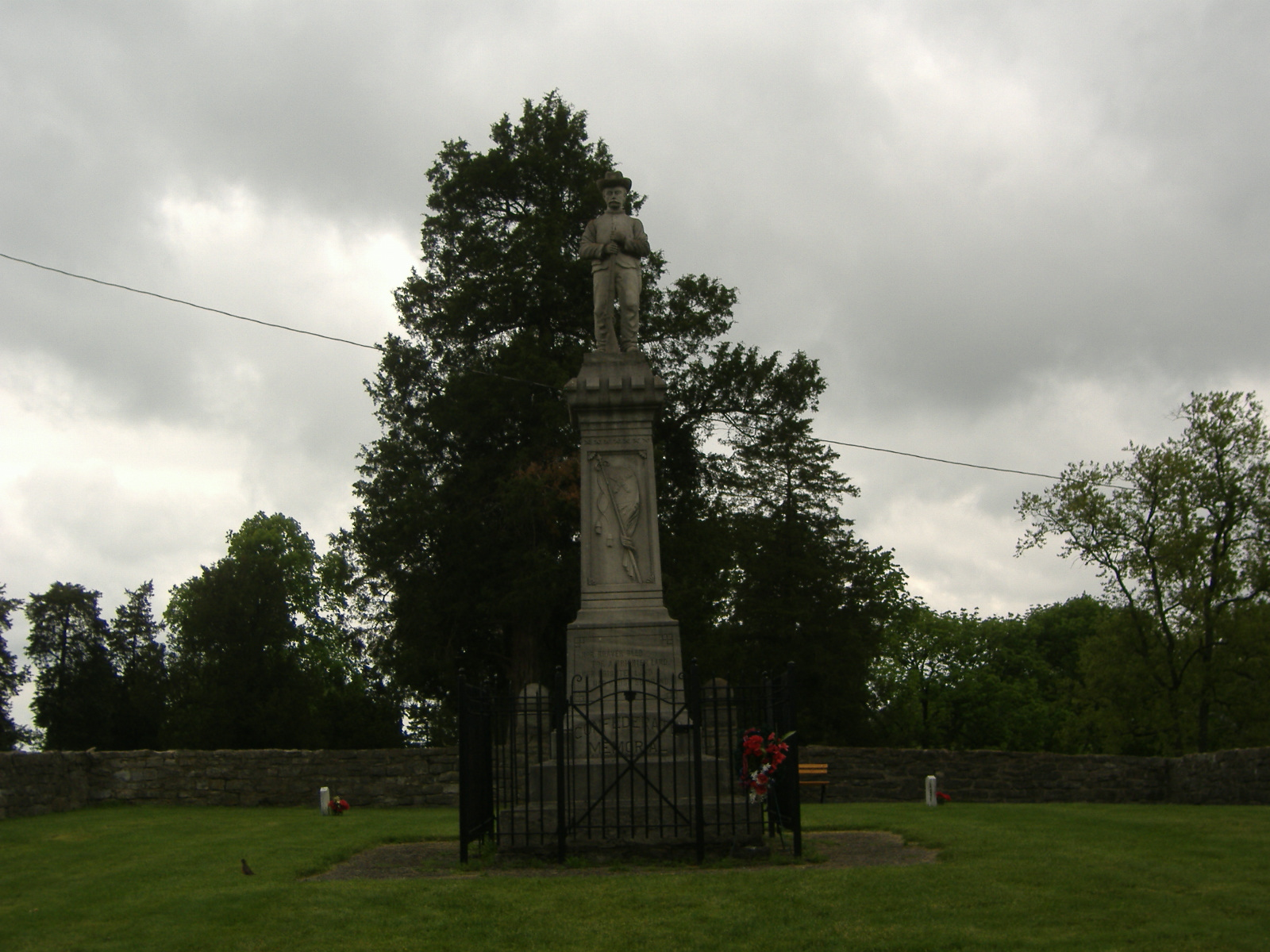
Monument on a cloudy day

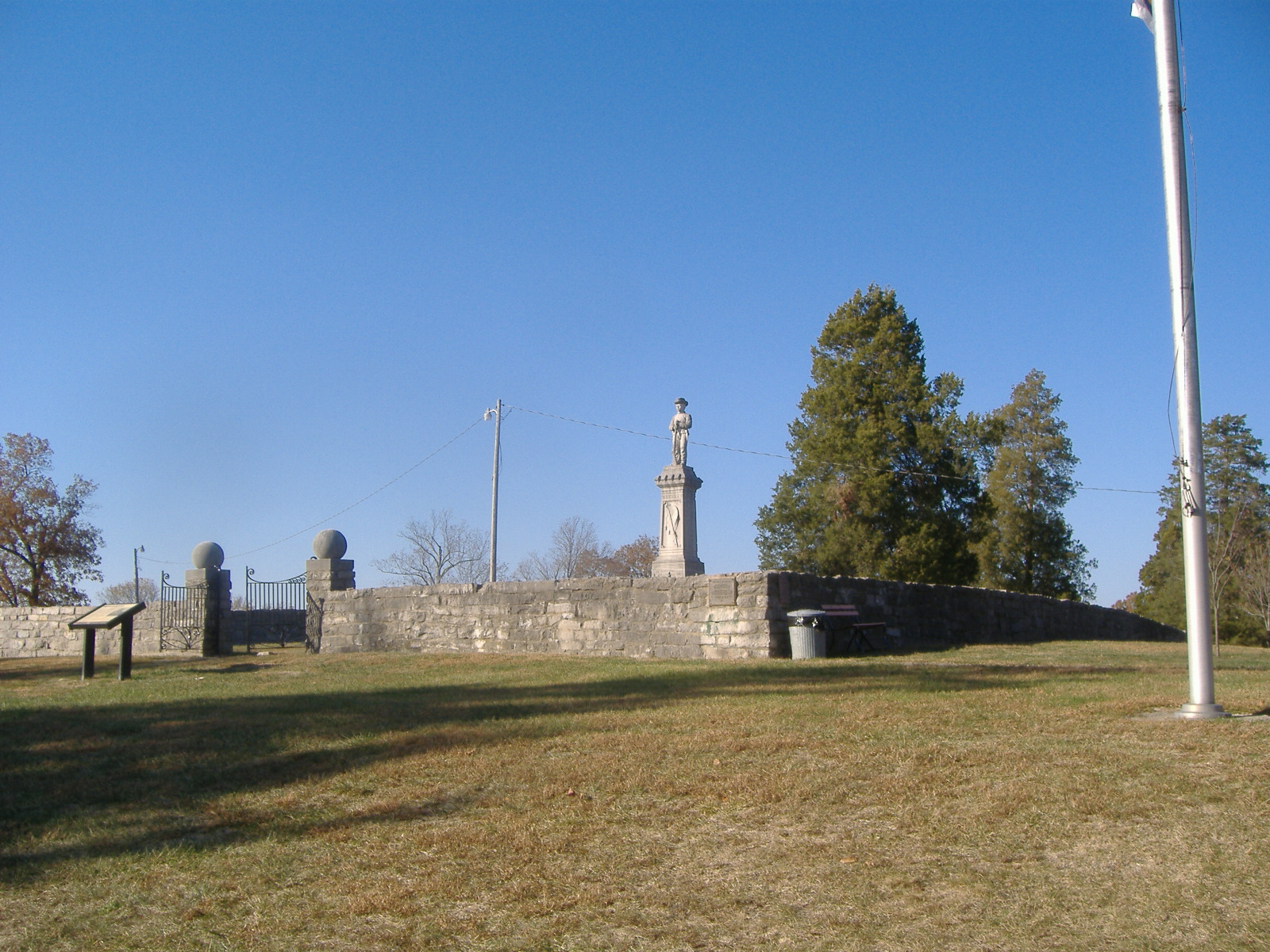
Perimeter of the monument

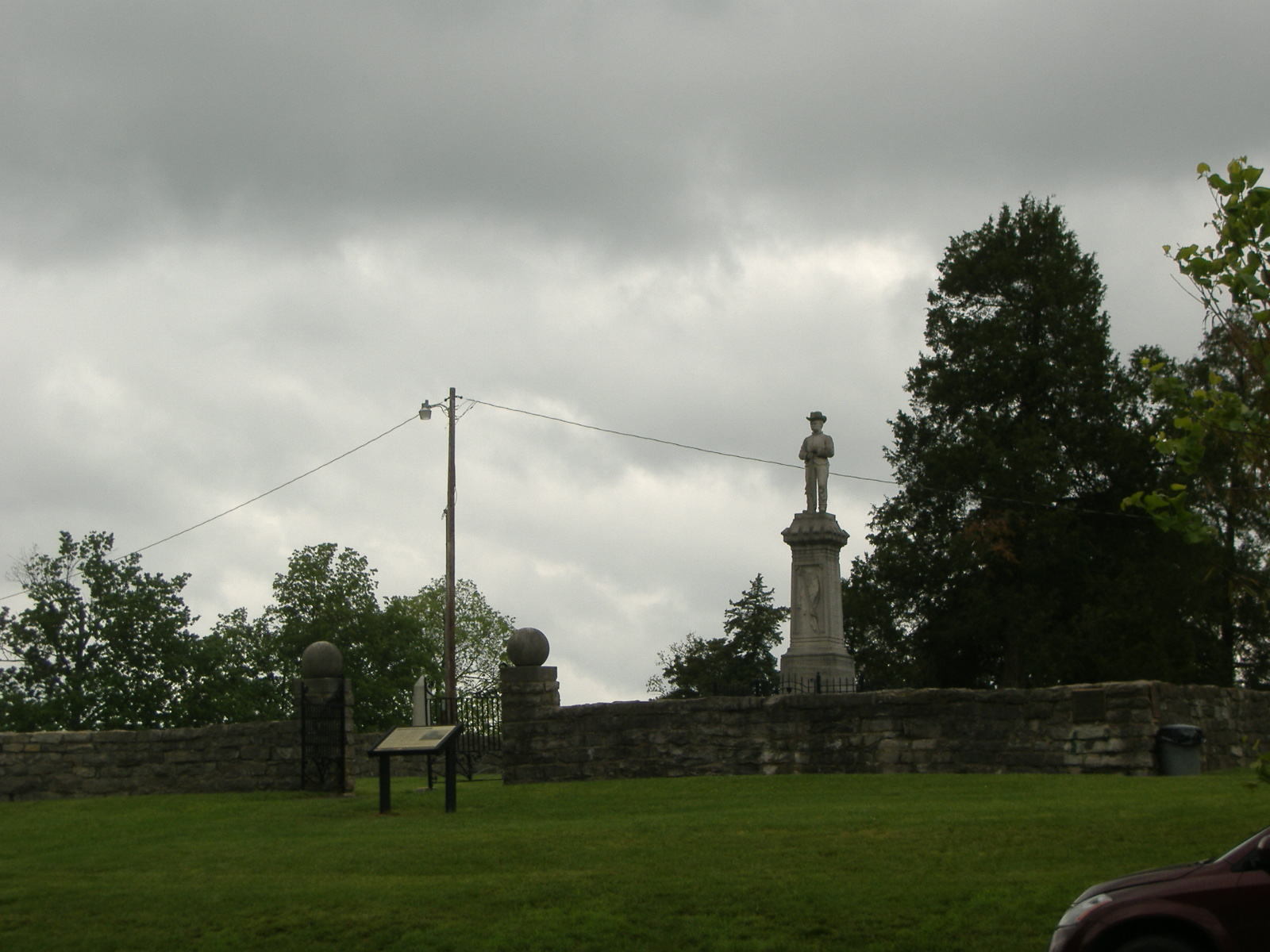
Perimeter of the monument on a cloudy day

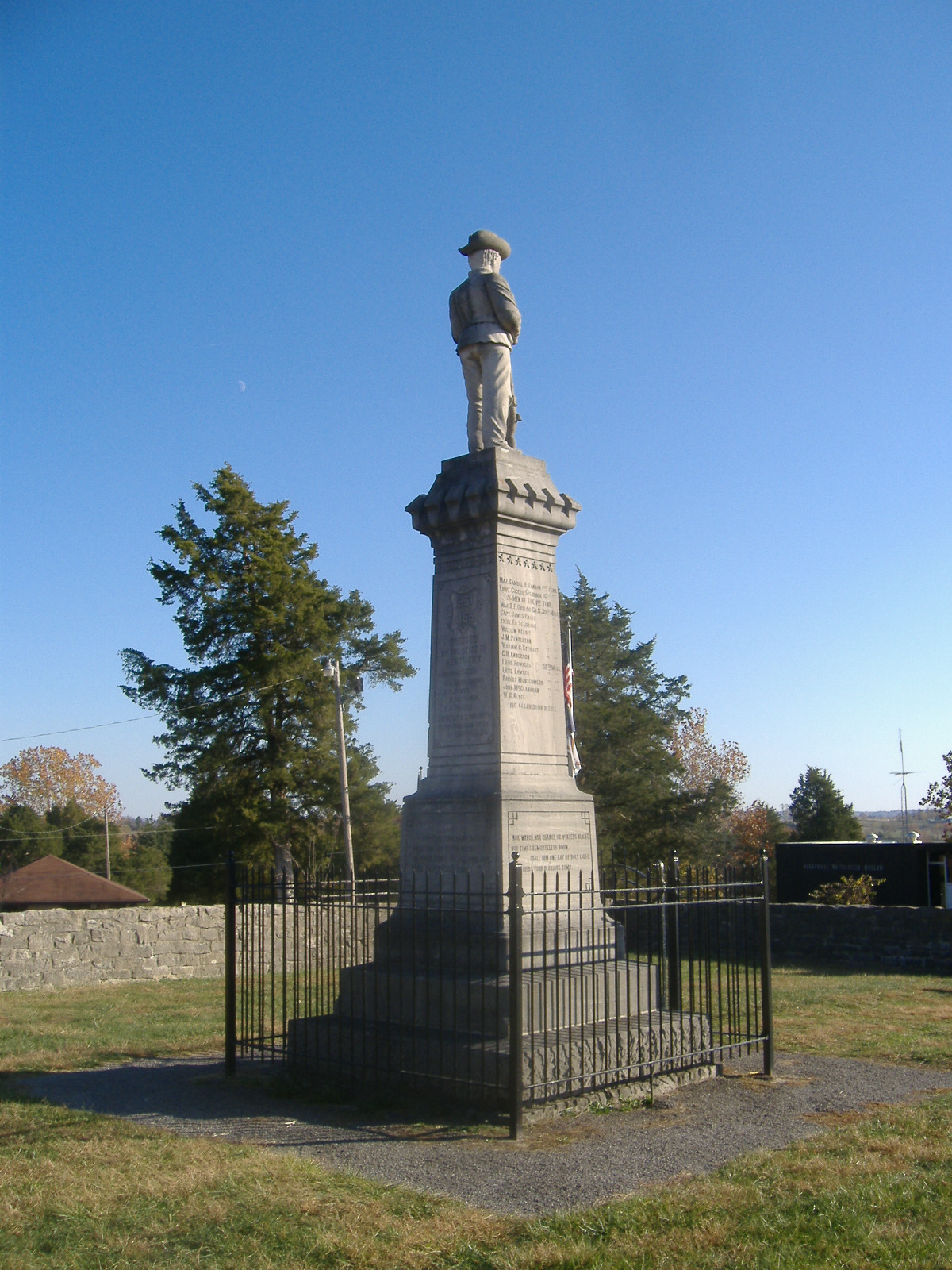
Closeup of the rear of the monument

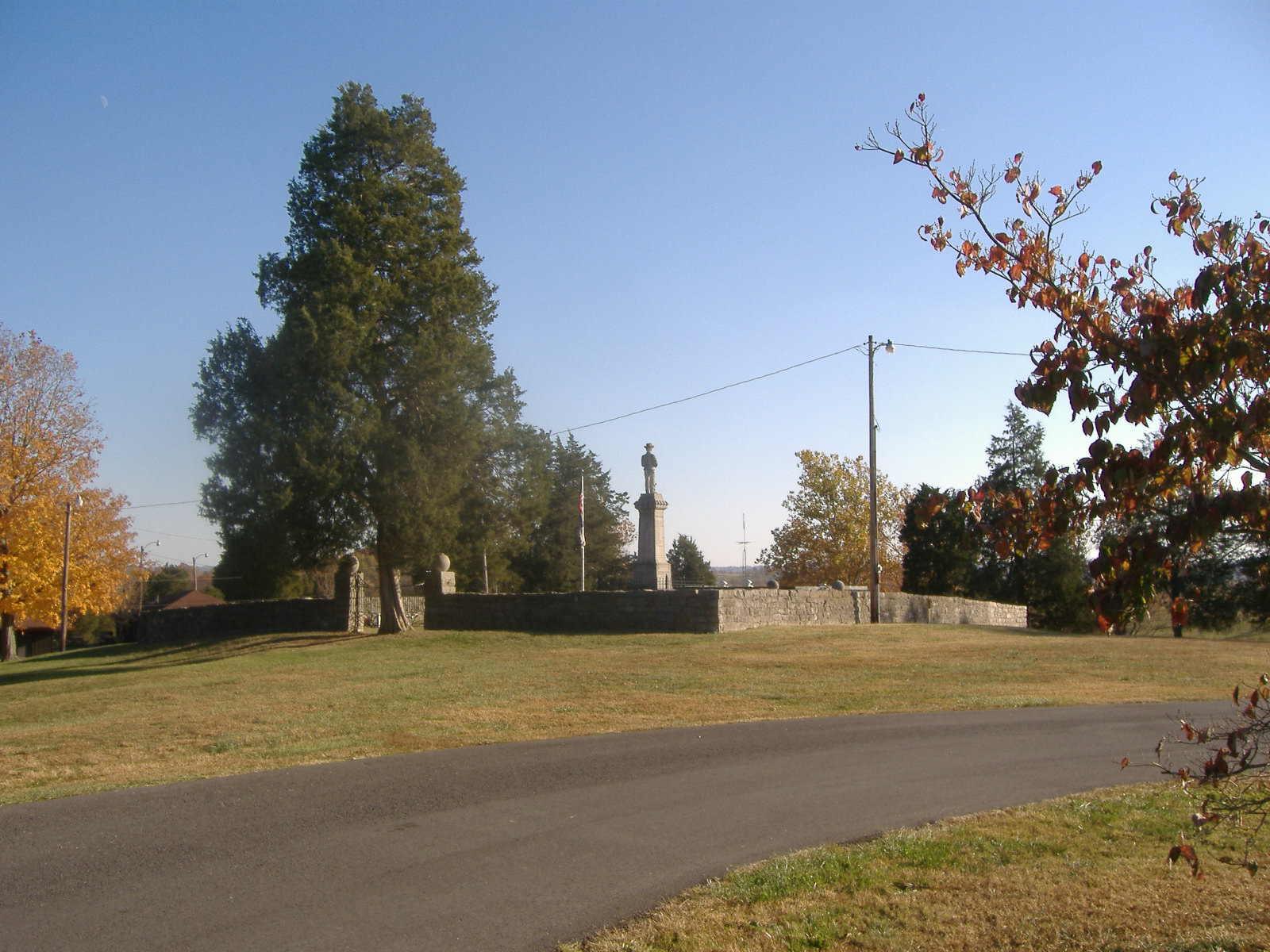
Far view of the rear of the perimeter
