= Confederate Monument in Danville =

- U.S. National Register of Historic Places
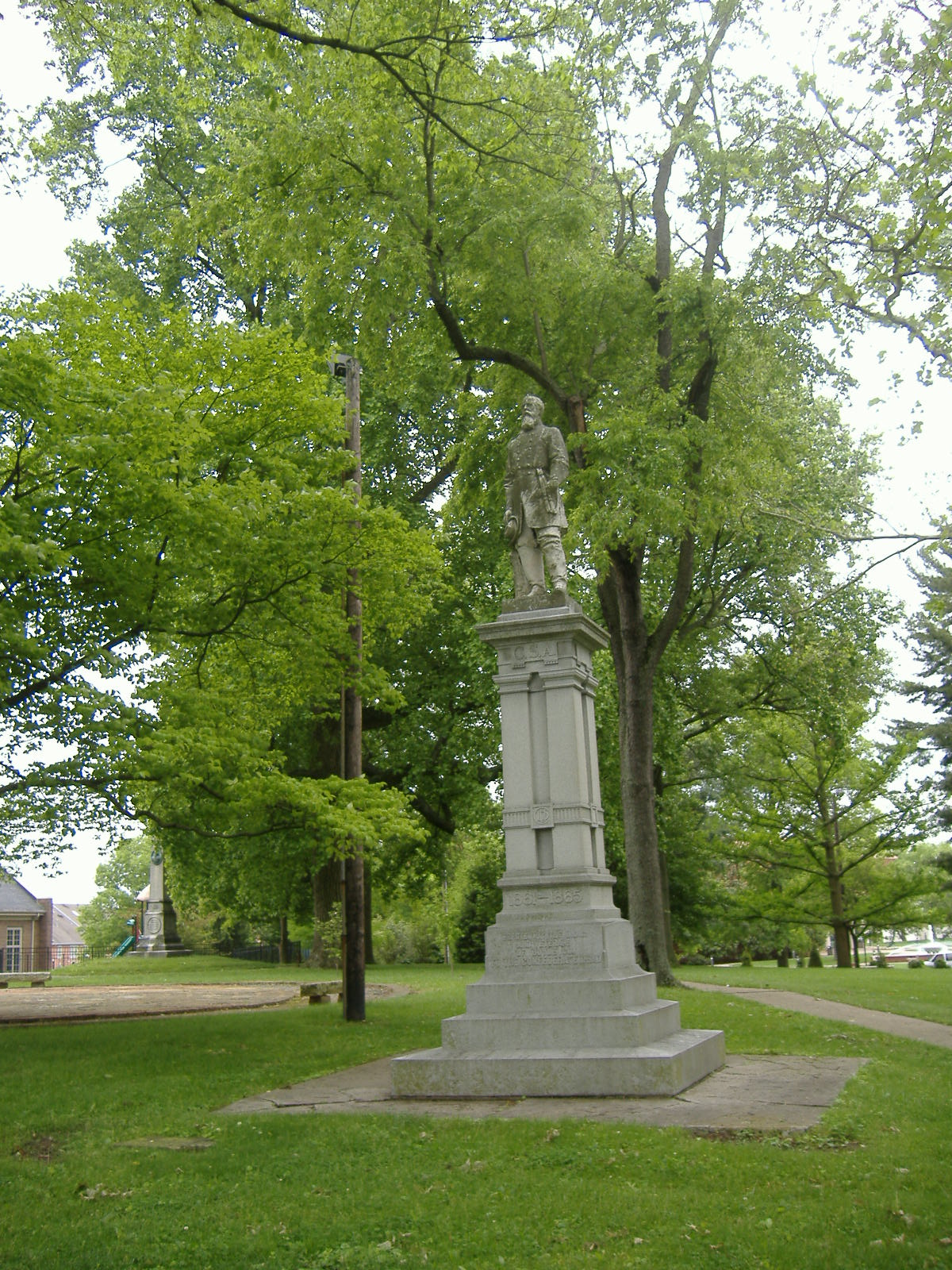
- The monument in the original location.

- Location within Kentucky Location within the United States
- Location: Originally in Danville, Kentucky
- Coordinates: 37°38′44″N 84°46′42″W
- Built: 1910
- MPS: Civil War Monuments of Kentucky MPS
- NRHP reference No.: 97000720
- Added to NRHP: July 17, 1997

The Confederate Monument in Danville, originally located between Centre College and the First Presbyterian Church at the corner of Main and College Streets in Danville, Kentucky, was a monument dedicated to the Confederate States of America that is on the National Register of Historic Places. The monument was dedicated in 1910 by the surviving veterans of the Confederacy of Boyle County, Kentucky and the Kate Morrison Breckinridge Chapter of the United Daughters of the Confederacy (UDC). In 2021, it was relocated to a museum in Meade County, Kentucky.

== Design ==
The monument consists of a granite pedestal and a marble statue resting thereon. The marble figure depicts Captain Robert D. Logan, who actually came from Lincoln County, Kentucky, but lived after the war in Boyle County. Captain Logan served under John Hunt Morgan in the 6th Kentucky Cavalry's Company A, and was captured after Morgan's Raid in Cheshire, Ohio on July 20, 1863, and spent much of the war afterwards in prison camps, particularly the Ohio State Penitentiary. He died on June 25, 1896, fourteen years before the construction of the monument. The granite pedestal is twelve feet tall, and uses pairs of Doric columns to decorate it. The main inscription, on the front side of the monument, reads: C.S.A. / UDC / 1861 - 1865 / ERECTED BY THE U.D.C. AND VETERANS OF BOYLE CO. TO THE CONFEDERATE DEAD. The inscription on the back side of the monument reads: "WHAT THEY WERE THE WHOLE WORLD KNOWS."

== History ==
Danville's participation in the war was limited. The courthouse and several buildings of Centre College served as hospitals for Union forces after the Battle of Perryville. On October 11, Confederate forces retreated through the city with a Union force behind them. Danville was also the birthplace of Theodore O'Hara, whose Bivouac of the Dead would be a popular poem placed in various cemeteries for the War's dead.

After the war, many citizens of Danville gave up their eventual burial spots in the city's Bellevue Cemetery to form a Confederate cemetery in 1868, with 66 fallen Confederate soldiers reinterred there. This cemetery adjoins the Danville National Cemetery (1862) that was reserved for former Union troops.

On July 17, 1997, the Confederate Monument in Danville was one of sixty different monuments related to the Civil War in Kentucky placed on the National Register of Historic Places, as part of the Civil War Monuments of Kentucky Multiple Property Submission. Three other monuments on the MPS are still in Boyle County, all of which commemorate the Battle of Perryville. These are the Confederate Monument in Perryville and Union Monument in Perryville, both by the visitor center at Perryville Battlefield State Historic Site, and the Unknown Confederate Dead Monument in Perryville, located in a nearby private cemetery.

== Removal ==
In 2019, the Session of The Presbyterian Church of Danville voted to remove the monument from church grounds and petitioned the City of Danville to allow the monument's relocation to Bellevue Cemetery. After the City refused to allow the relocation, the UDC selected an alternative site in Meade County, Kentucky and, with the agreement of The Presbyterian Church, removed the monument from the church's property on December 29, 2021.
