= Union Monument in Perryville =

- U.S. National Register of Historic Places
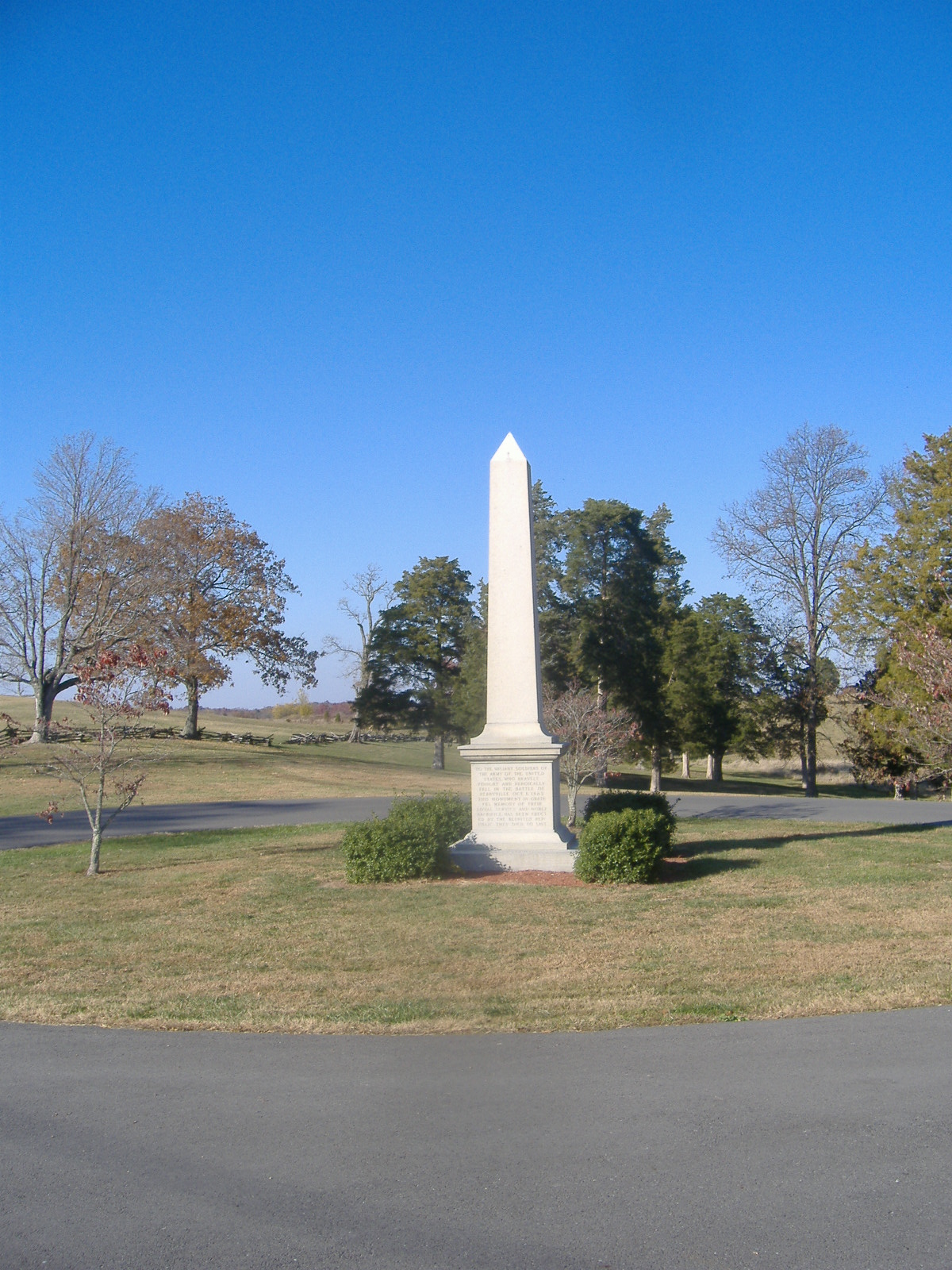

- Location within Kentucky Location within the United States
- Nearest city: Perryville, Kentucky
- Built: 1928
- MPS: Civil War Monuments of Kentucky
- NRHP reference No.: 97000723
- Added to NRHP: July 17, 1997

The Union Monument in Perryville is an historic monument located by the visitor center of the Perryville Battlefield State Historic Site, in the vicinity of Perryville, Kentucky, in Boyle County, Kentucky. It was built in 1928, sixty-six years after the Battle of Perryville, the bloodiest battle in Kentucky history, on October 8, 1862. There were 16,000 Union soldiers at the Battle of Perryville, with 4,276 combined killed, captured, wounded, and missing.

The monument was created by a decree of the United States Congress on March 3, 1928. It is a granite obelisk, eighteen feet tall, and is one of only seven monuments to the war in Kentucky that honored the Union cause; the vast majority honored the Confederate States of America. Inscriptions are placed on the north and south sides of the monument. All but one Union monument in Kentucky was erected by either the Federal Government or private funds. The monument at Vanceburg, Kentucky is the only Union structure in Kentucky erected by public submission.

On July 17, 1997, the Union Monument in Perryville was one of sixty different monuments related to the Civil War in Kentucky placed on the National Register of Historic Places, as part of the Civil War Monuments of Kentucky Multiple Property Submission. Three other monuments on this Multiple Property Submission are or were also in Boyle County. One of them, the Confederate Monument in Perryville, stands a few yards away, between the Union Monument and the visitor center of the Perryville Battlefield State Historic Site. The Unknown Confederate Dead Monument in Perryville is a mile away on private land at the Goodknight Cemetery. Like the Union monument, it was built in or around 1928, much later than the 1902 construction of the Confederate Monument. The other was formerly in downtown Danville, Kentucky, but is now in Brandenburg, Kentucky: the Confederate Monument in Danville.

== Gallery ==
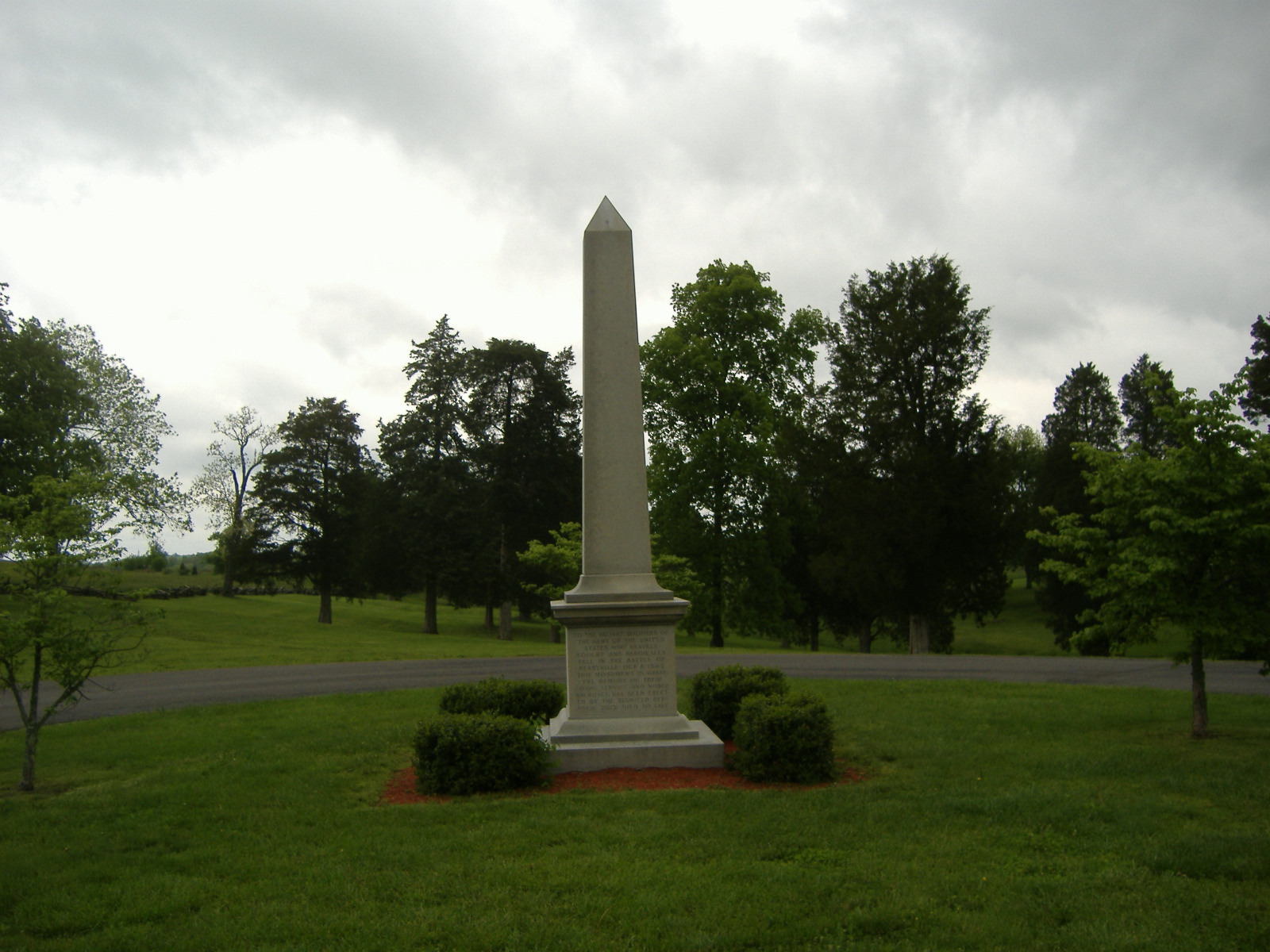
Monument on a cloudy day

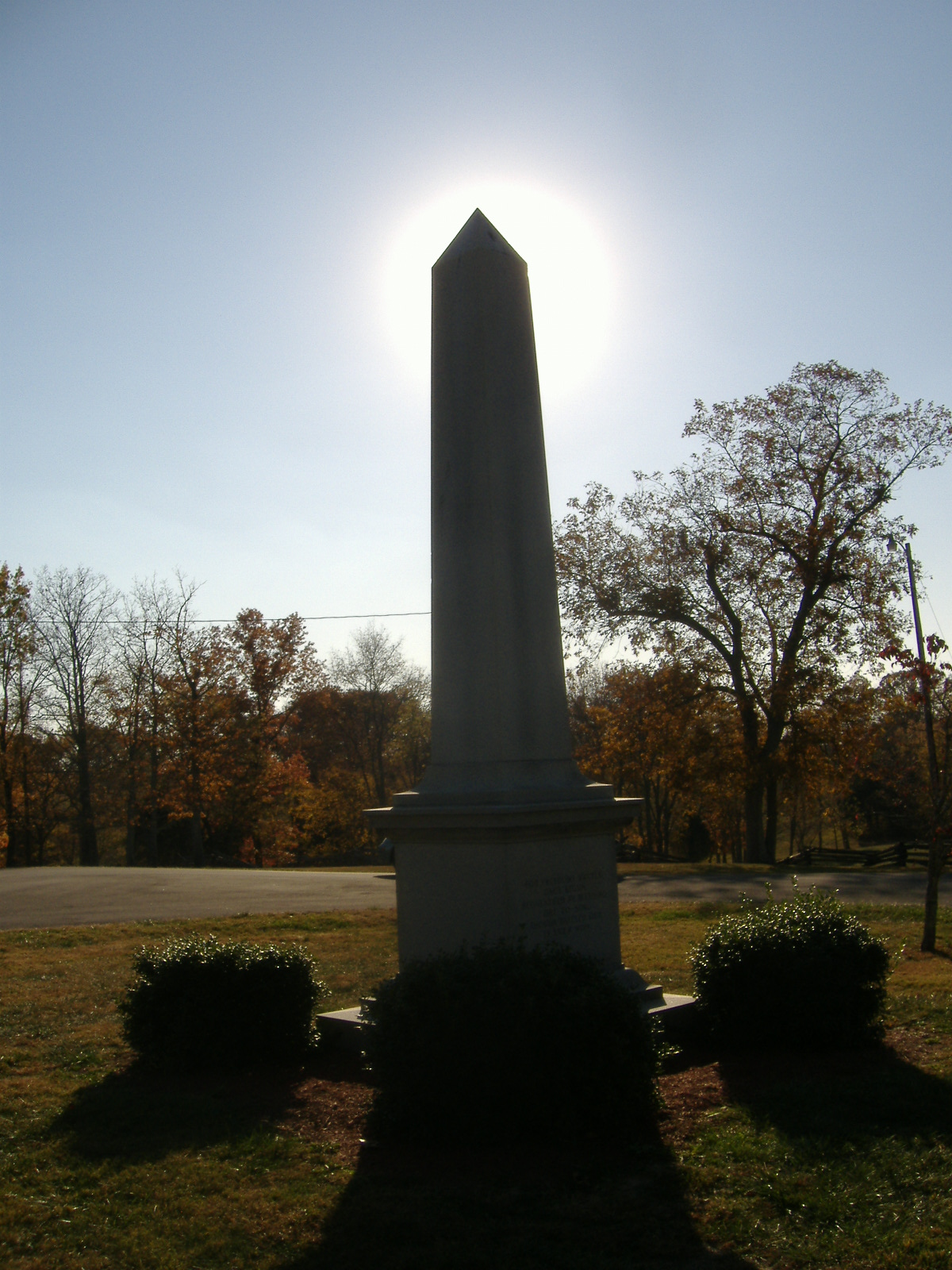
Aura around monument

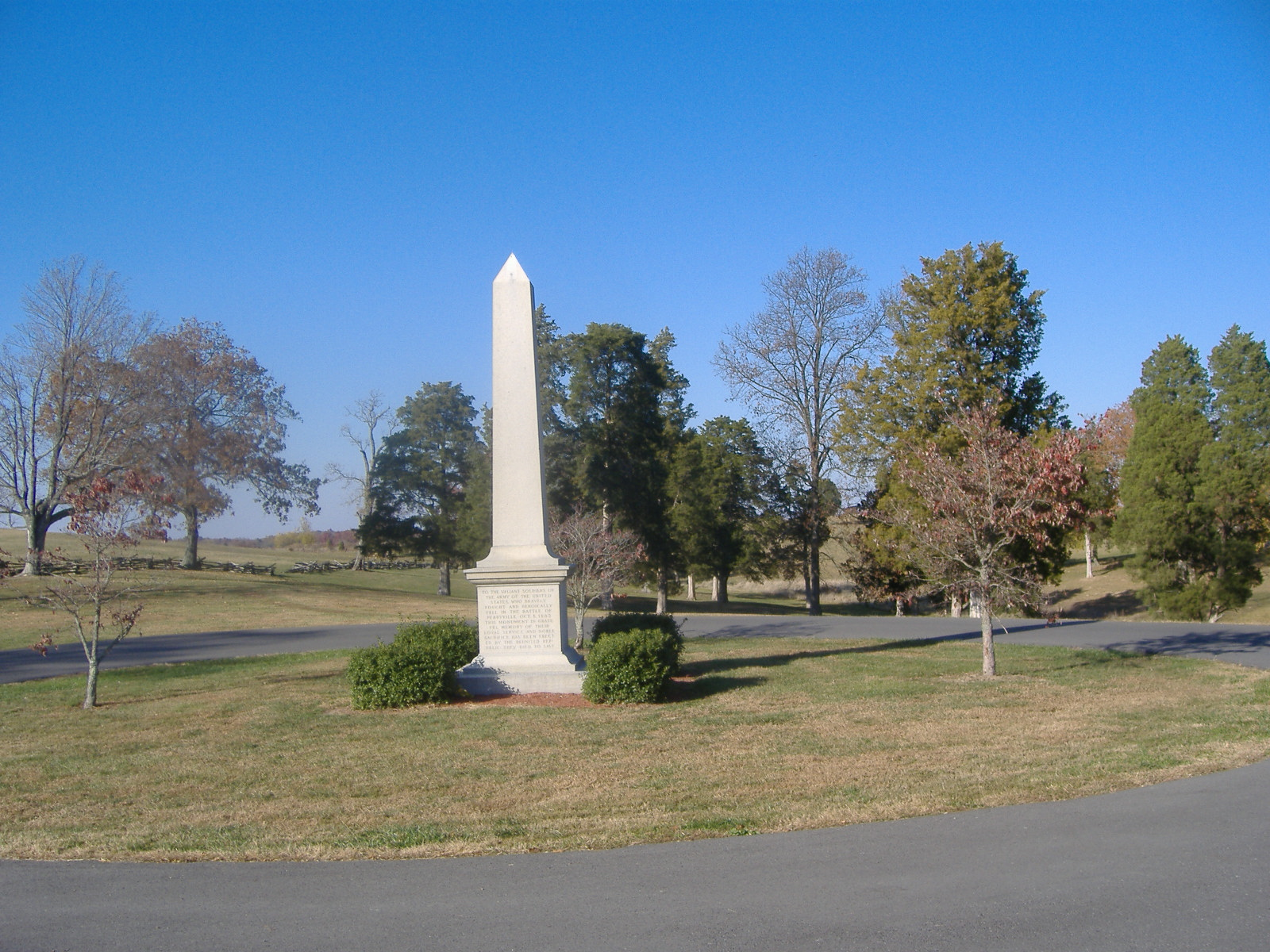
Driving circle around the monument
