= Unknown Confederate Dead Monument in Perryville =

Civil War memorial in Boyle County, Kentucky

- U.S. National Register of Historic Places
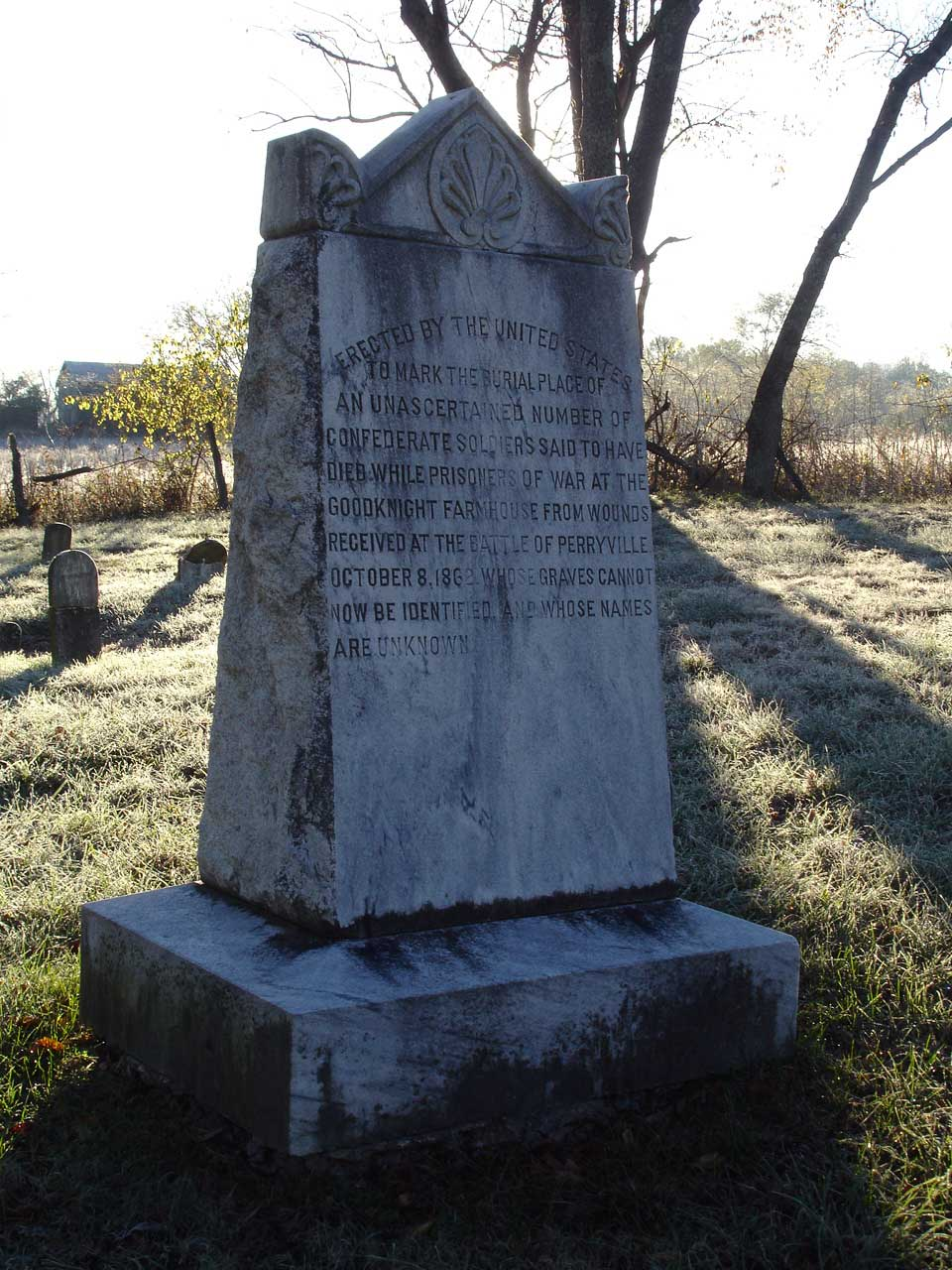
- Nearest city: Perryville, Kentucky
- Built: 1928
- Architectural style: Thanatonic
- MPS: Civil War Monuments of Kentucky
- NRHP reference No.: 97000721
- Added to NRHP: July 17, 1997

The Unknown Confederate Dead Monument in Perryville is located in the vicinity of Perryville, Kentucky, in Boyle County, Kentucky, United States, in the Goodknight Cemetery, a small family cemetery on private land. It is presumed to have been constructed around the year 1928, sixty-six years after the Battle of Perryville, the bloodiest battle in Kentucky history, on October 8, 1862, in which the Confederate soldiers buried here anonymously died. In total, 532 Confederates died at the battle, but it is unknown how many of this number are buried here.

The monument is approximately seven feet (2.1 m) tall, and is made up of a marble and granite composite. It has an 18-inch (46 cm) tall marble scalloped decorative cap; a granite body six inches (15 cm) thick with an inscription, stating that it honors the unknown number of Confederate soldiers buried here anonymously; and a marble base of 4 by 2 feet (122 by 61 cm). Despite being on private property, it was the federal government that erected the monument.

On July 17, 1997, the Unknown Confederate Dead Monument in Perryville was one of sixty different monuments related to the Civil War in Kentucky placed on the National Register of Historic Places, as part of the Civil War Monuments of Kentucky Multiple Property Submission. Three other monuments on this Multiple Property Submission are or were also in Boyle County. Two of them are in the nearby Perryville Battlefield State Historic Site by the visitor center: the Confederate Monument in Perryville and the Union Monument in Perryville. The other was formerly in downtown Danville, Kentucky, but is now in Brandenburg, Kentucky: the Confederate Monument in Danville. Many of the other memorials are in graveyards that have numerous unknown soldiers, but the Goodknight Cemetery is the only graveyard which has no soldiers with known names.
