= Perryville Battlefield State Historic Site =

Battlefield in Kentucky, United States

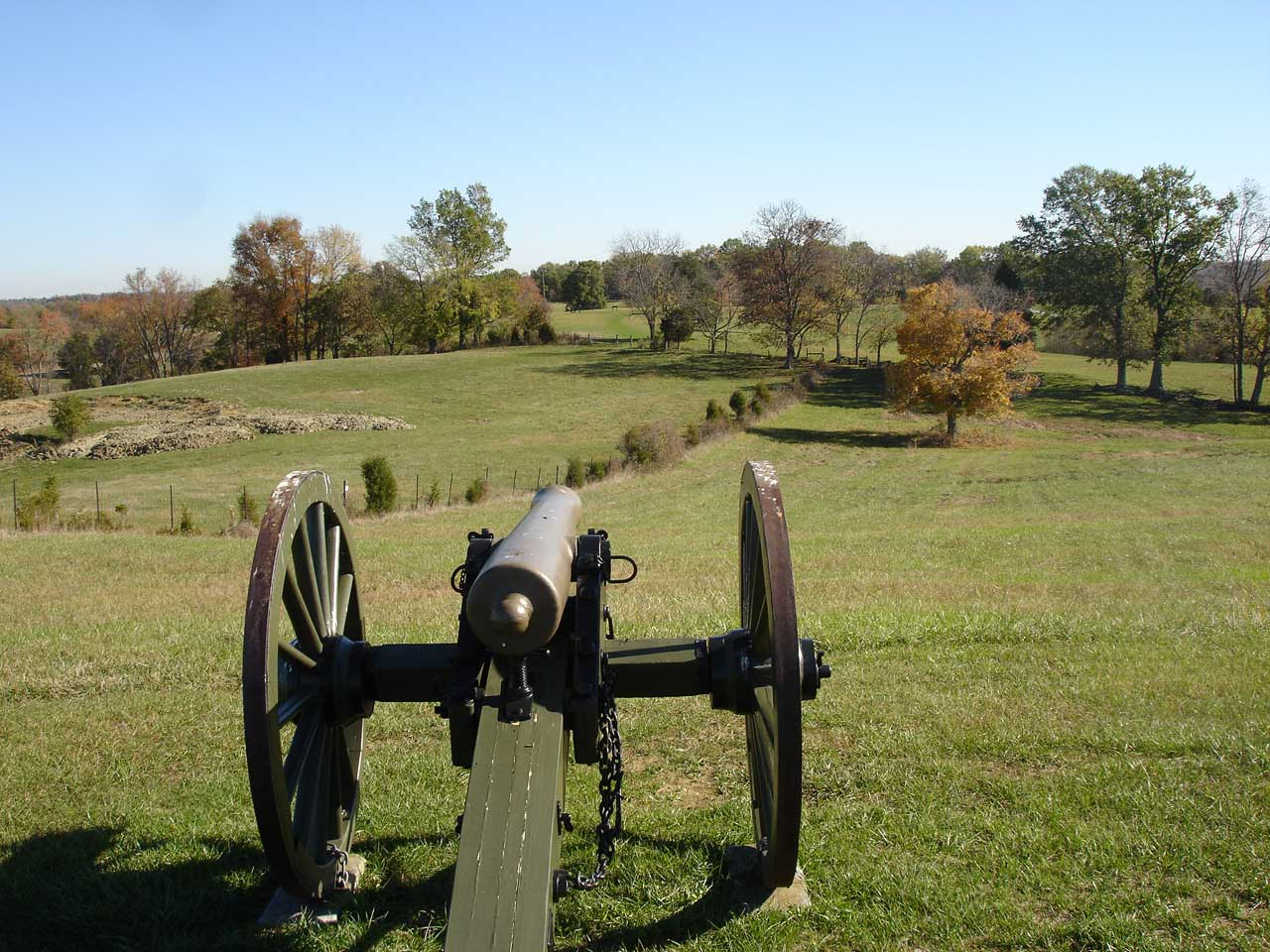
- View from Parsons' Independent Battery position on the Open Knob

- Location within Kentucky Location within the United States
- Location: Boyle County, Kentucky, United States
- Coordinates: 37°40′31″N 84°58′11″W
- Area: 745 acres (301 ha)
- Elevation: 860 ft (260 m)
- Established: 1936
- Administrator: Kentucky Department of Parks
- Website: Official website
- Perryville Battlefield
- U.S. National Register of Historic Places
- U.S. National Historic Landmark
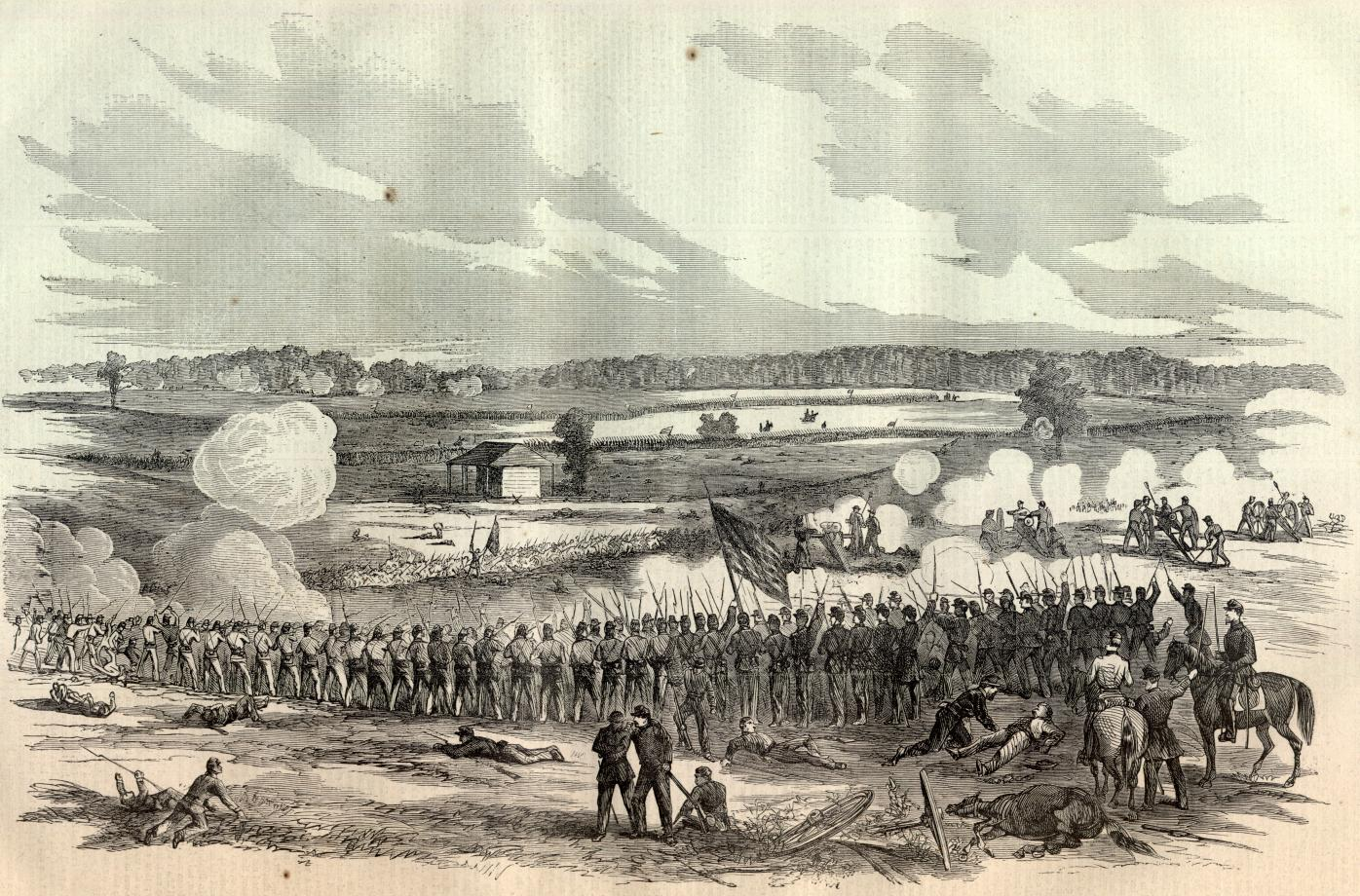
- The Battle of Perryville as depicted in Harper's Weekly

- Location within Kentucky Location within the United States
- Location: Boyle County, Kentucky
- Nearest city: Perryville, Kentucky
- Area: 2,500 acres (1,000 ha)
- Built: 1862
- NRHP reference No.: 66000356
- Added to NRHP: October 15, 1966

Perryville Battlefield State Historic Site is a 745-acre (3.01 km^{2}) park near Perryville, Kentucky. The park continues to expand with purchases of parcels by the Office of Kentucky Nature Preserves' Kentucky Heritage Land Conservation Fund and the American Battlefield Trust. An interpretive museum is located near the site where many Confederate soldiers killed in the Battle of Perryville were buried. Monuments, interpretive signage, and cannons also mark notable events during the battle. The site became part of the Kentucky State Park System in 1936.

== Battle ==
The battle was fought on October 8, 1862, between the U.S. Army of the Ohio, commanded by U.S. Maj. Gen. Don Carlos Buell, and the Confederate Army of Mississippi, commanded by Gen. Braxton Bragg. The battle was a tactical victory for the Confederates but a strategic victory for the United States because Bragg withdrew his army from Kentucky, which remained in U.S. hands for the remainder of the war.

Perryville's homes and farms were left in shambles by the battle. Henry P. "Squire" Bottom, a Unionist enslaver on whose farm a significant portion of the battle was fought, suffered losses of pork, corn, hay, and wood to U.S. Army soldiers who remained in the area for weeks after the fighting. Bottom's farm was significantly damaged during the battle, including the loss of a substantial barn filled with hay that burned completely due to artillery fire from a Confederate battery. Other accounts note that nearly all area residents suffered some losses and had their homes and outbuildings used as field hospitals.

The main U.S. Army force buried most of their dead in long trenches before pursuing Bragg, but most Confederate dead were still unburied a week after the battle. U.S. soldiers required Perryville residents to help them lay the dead in shallow trenches carved into the dry soil. Two months later, 347 were reburied in a mass grave on Bottom's land. In 1886, 435 Confederates were buried on Bottom's land; this land was chosen because their dead lay thickest on the eastern slope. Although Bottom claimed that about 100 were identified, the only remnants of the cemetery were a corner of a stone wall and one headstone—that of Samuel H. Ransom of the 1st Tennessee Infantry CSA.

At the war's end in 1865, the U.S. Army reburied the remains of 969 U.S. soldiers in a national cemetery at Perryville with a stone wall, two gates, and plans for a monument. The monument was never erected, however, and in 1867 the new cemetery was closed, and the U.S. fallen soldiers transferred to Camp Nelson National Cemetery in Jessamine County, Kentucky, leaving no identified U.S. casualties on the field at Perryville.

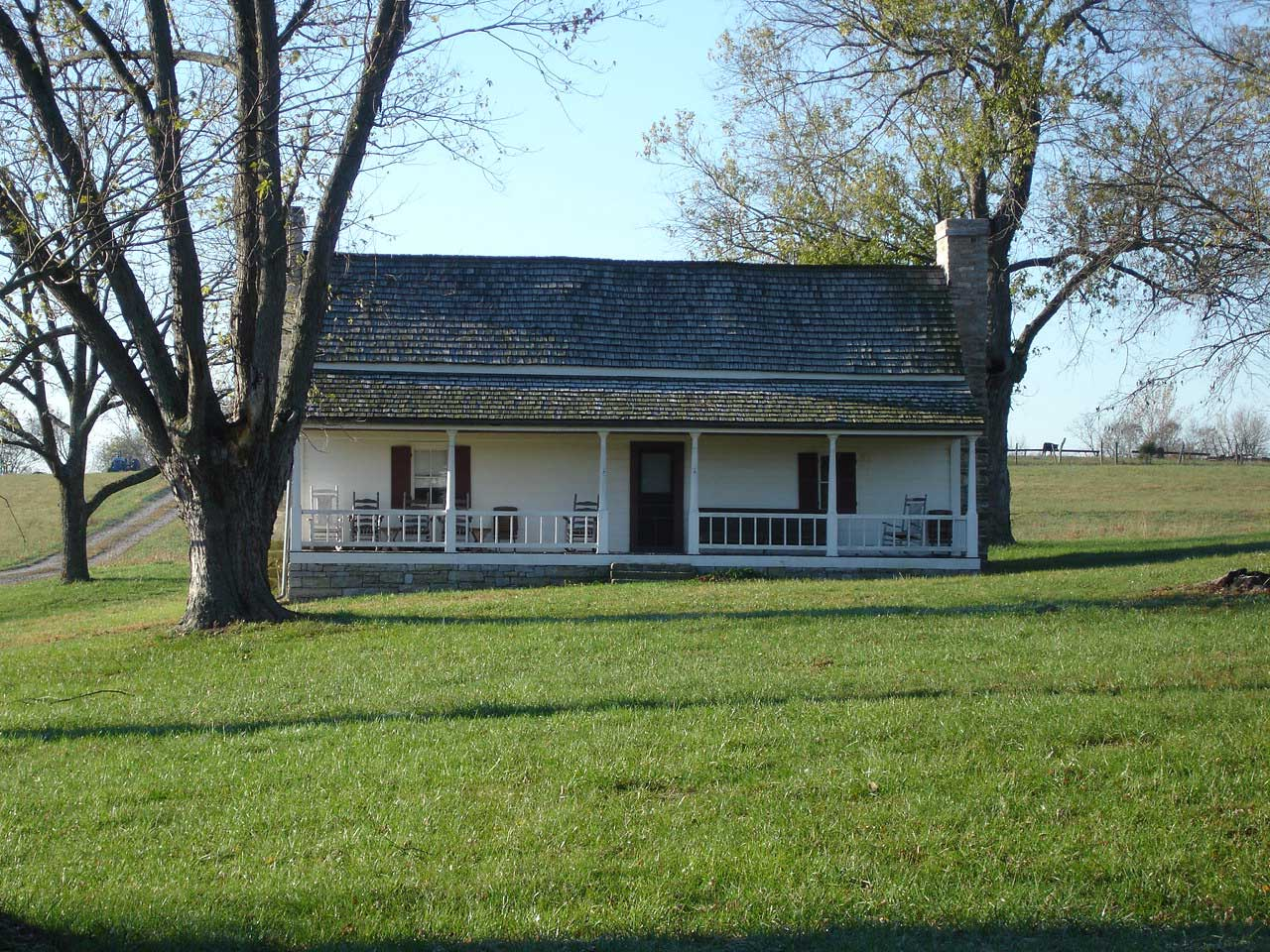
H.P. Bottom House

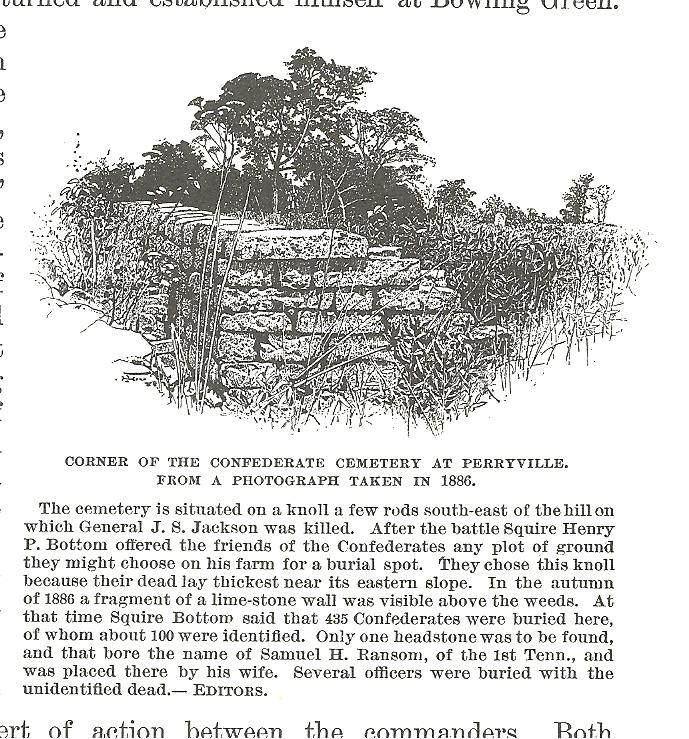
Confederate Cemetery Perryville KY in 1886

== Memorial ==
On the fortieth anniversary of the battle in 1902, a Confederate monument was dedicated in the Confederate cemetery begun by Henry Bottom, and a smaller U.S. memorial was erected nearby in 1931. The Perryville State Battlefield site was established in 1954 by the Kentucky State Conservation Commission, and a museum and visitor center were opened near the monuments on the battle's one-hundredth anniversary in 1962.

For a century following the war, the memory of the Battle of Perryville (and many others fought in the Western Theater) was minimized by what has been called the "Lee tradition," which emphasized the deeds of the armies and generals who fought in the Eastern Theater, particularly Virginia. However, numerous scholars worked to establish the importance of Western campaigns around the time of the American Civil War Centennial. In recent years, appreciation for what happened at Perryville and other battlefields in Kentucky, Tennessee, and Mississippi has grown.

About 2,500 acres (1,000 ha) at Perryville were recognized as a National Historic Landmark in 1960, and the site averages around 7,000 visitors per year. The acquisition of 149 acres (0.6 km^{2}) of farmland from a descendant of Henry Bottom more than doubled the size of the park and allowed visitors to complete a tour of the entire battlefield. The American Battlefield Trust and its partners, including the Office of Kentucky Nature Preserves Kentucky Heritage Land Conservation Fund, have acquired and preserved 1,202 acres at the Perryville battlefield through mid-2023. Numerous acres of this saved land have been incorporated in the state park.

== In popular culture ==
Paranormal Investigators, Ghost Adventures visited the site where they found shadowy figures from the American Civil War walking through the fields. They revisited the site in 2013 and again in 2017.
