= List of Confederate monuments and memorials in Georgia =

Confederate monuments and memorials in Georgia

Note: This is a sublist of List of Confederate monuments and memorials from the Georgia section.

This is a list of Confederate monuments and memorials in Georgia that were established as public displays and symbols of the Confederate States of America (CSA), Confederate leaders, or Confederate soldiers of the American Civil War. Part of the commemoration of the American Civil War, these symbols include monuments and statues, flags, holidays and other observances, and the names of schools, roads, parks, bridges, counties, cities, lakes, dams, military bases, and other public works. (Note: "In an effort to assist the efforts of local communities to re-examine these symbols, the SPLC launched a study to catalog them. For the final tally, the researchers excluded nearly 2,600 markers, battlefields, museums, cemeteries and other places or symbols that are largely historical in nature.")

This list does not include items which are largely historic in nature such as historic markers or battlefield parks if they were not established to honor the Confederacy. Nor does it include figures connected with the origins of the Civil War or white supremacy, but not with the Confederacy.

Georgia has a statute making it difficult to remove Confederate monuments because it is unlawful to damage, relocate or remove any memorials honoring any military personnel of the state or USA or the Confederate States of America.

As of 24 June 2020, there are at least 201 public spaces with Confederate monuments in Georgia.

== State capitol ==
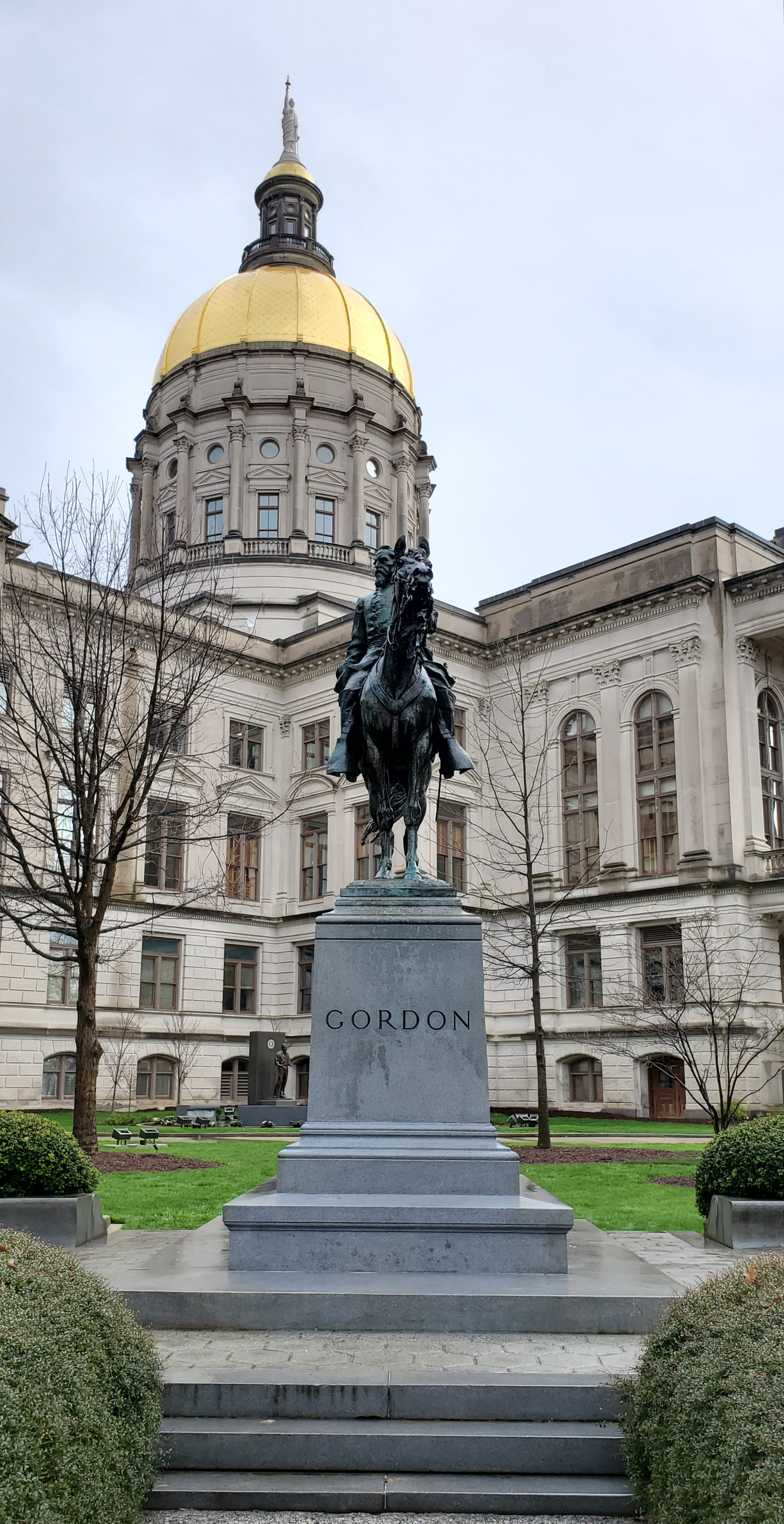
John Brown Gordon statue in front of the Georgia State Capitol

- Statue of John Brown Gordon, Georgia State Capitol grounds (1907). "One of the leading proponents of both the New South creed and the Lost Cause, a philosophy that greatly romanticized the South's role in the war. Moreover, he is generally acknowledged as having been the head of the Ku Klux Klan in Georgia.
- Statue of Benjamin Harvey Hill, Confederate Senator, Georgia State Capitol.
- Statue of Elizabeth and Joseph E. Brown. "Brown was the Confederate governor of Georgia and after the war served as [U.S.] senator. He also was an ardent secessionist. After the war, Brown served briefly as chief justice of the Georgia Supreme Court and authored an opinion upholding the state's ban on interracial marriage that described such marriages as 'productive of evil, and evil only, without any corresponding good.'... That opinion was cited in several briefs in the Supreme Court's recent decision on gay marriage as an example of how government has consistently erred in defining marriage."
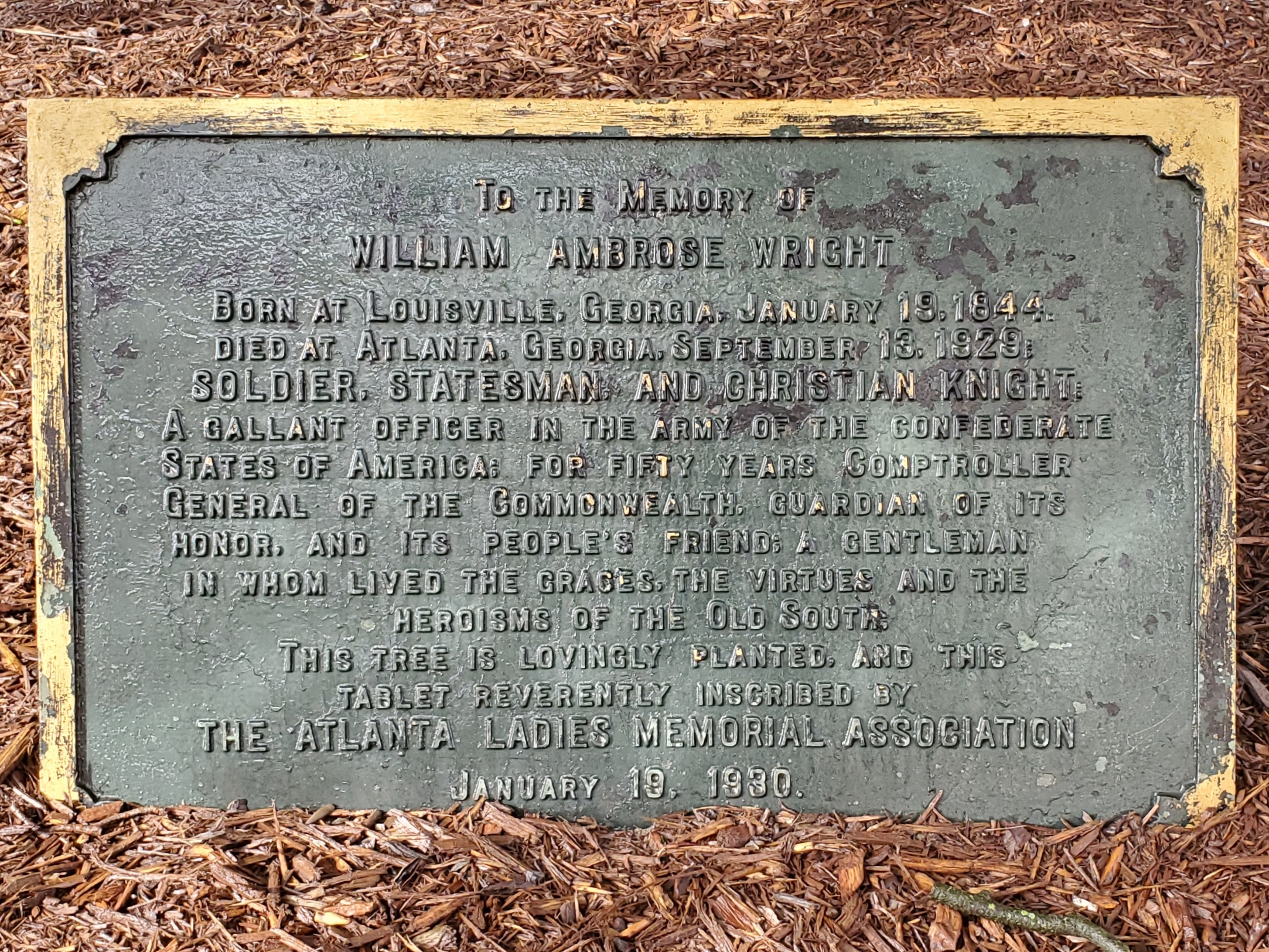
- Plaque honoring William Ambrose Wright
  Plaque and tree honoring William Ambrose Wright, a lieutenant in the Confederate States Army, and Georgia state comptroller for fifty years, as well as insurance commissioner. Erected by the Atlanta Ladies Memorial Association, January 19, 1930.

== State flag ==
Flag of Georgia since 2003

The current (2024) Georgia flag is based on the first national flag of the Confederacy, which was nicknamed the "Stars and Bars".

== State holiday ==
- Confederate Memorial Day, celebrated the last Monday in April, but officially called only "State Holiday".

== Stone Mountain (state monument) ==
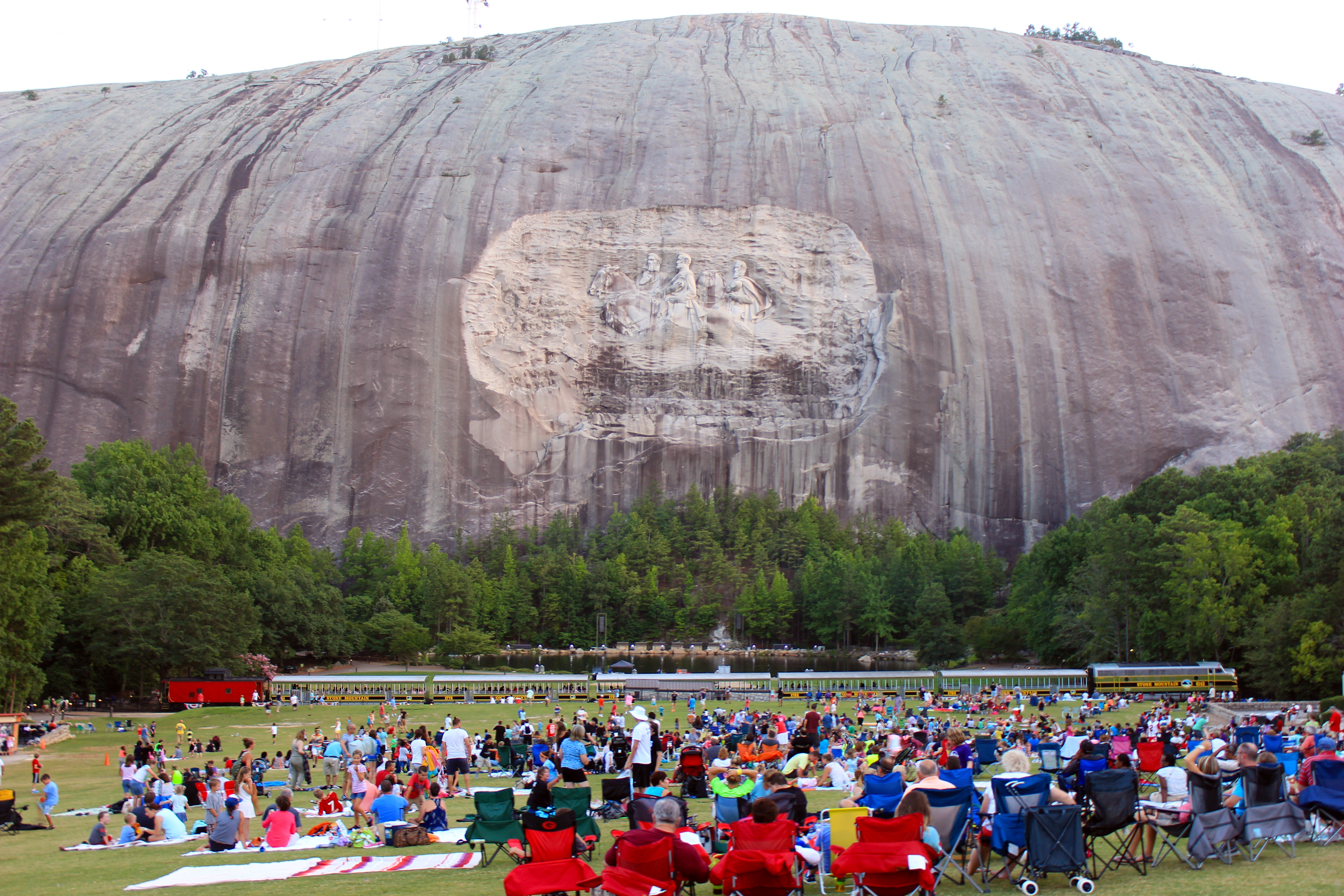
Stone Mountain Confederate Memorial Carving (1923–72)

Stone Mountain is owned by the state of Georgia. When Georgia purchased the site, "it was designated as a memorial to the Confederacy". The Stone Mountain Park officially opened on April 14, 1965 – 100 years to the day after Lincoln's assassination. Site of the rebirth of the Ku Klux Klan (the Second Clan), on the top of the mountain, with cross burning, in 1915. Stone Mountain was the location of an annual Labor Day cross-burning ceremony for the next 50 years. In 2019 it is the most-visited attraction in the state of Georgia.

- Four flags of the Confederacy are flown.
- The Stone Mountain Memorial Lawn "contains...thirteen terraces — one for each Confederate state.... Each terrace flies the flag that the state flew as member of the Confederacy."
- Stone Mountain Confederate Memorial Carving, 1923–72, the largest such carving in the world.

== Buildings ==
- Athens: Allen D. Candler Hall at the University of Georgia (1901)
- Athens: Joseph E. Brown Hall at the University of Georgia (1932)

== Monuments ==
=== Courthouse monuments ===
- Blakely: Confederate Flagpole, Early County Courthouse (1861)
- Butler: Taylor County Confederate Monument (1911)
- Cairo: Confederate Soldier Monument and Flag, Grady County Courthouse
- Carnesville: Franklin County Confederate Monument (1910)
- Carrollton: Confederate Monument (1910)
- Cartersville: Confederate memorial at the Bartow County Courthouse
- Cedartown: Polk County Confederate Monument (1906)
- Clayton: Confederate Flag, Rabun County Courthouse
- Conyers: Confederate Monument (1913)
- Covington: Confederate War Memorial (1906)
- Crawfordville: Confederate Monument (1898)
- Cusseta: Confederate Veterans Monument
- Decatur: DeKalb County Confederate Monument, Decatur Square, in front of Old DeKalb County Courthouse. The monument, erected 1911, antedates the Square and also antedates the Old Courthouse. Residents are petitioning for its removal. The County Commission of DeKalb County voted 6-1 to ask its attorneys to find a legal way to remove or relocate it.
- Douglasville: Confederate War Memorial (1914)
- Dublin: Laurens County Confederate Monument (1912)
- Eastman: Confederate Monument of Eastman (1910)
- Eatonton: Birthplace of Lucius Quintus Cincinnatus Lamar (1936)
- Ellaville: Schley County Confederate Monument (1910)
- Forsyth: Confederate Monument (1907)
- Greensboro: Greene County Confederate Monument (1898)
- Hartwell: Confederate Monument (1908)
- Hawkinsville: Confederate Monument (1908)
- Hazlehurst: Jefferson Davis Bust
- Hinesville: Liberty County Confederate Monument, Liberty County Courthouse (1928)
- Jackson: Monument to Butts County Confederate Soldiers (1911)
- Jeffersonville: A shaft called Shannon's Meadow, in front of Twiggs County Courthouse.
- Lawrenceville: Lawrenceville Confederate Memorial (1990)
- Lexington: Oglethorpe County Confederate Monument (1916)
- Lumpkin: Stewart County Confederate Monument (1908), included in Lumpkin Commercial Historic District
- Macon: "Women of the South" (1911), UDC monument featuring a young soldier receiving aid from a mother and young girl, as well as a bas-relief showing both a pre-war family, and one devastated by war. Moved from city hall to a nearby park in 1934.
- McDonough: Confederate Memorial Drinking Fountain (1915)
- Millen: Jenkins County Confederate Monument, Jenkins County Courthouse (1909)
- Monroe: Confederate Monument (1907)
- Moultrie: Colquitt County Confederate Monument, Colquitt County Courthouse (1909)
- Mount Vernon: Confederate Monument, Montgomery County Courthouse (1997)
- Nashville: Confederate Memorial, Berrien County Courthouse
- Newnan. Located at the original County Courthouse, now the Coweta County Probate Court.
  - Coweta County Confederate Monument. Erected 1885 by the Ladies Memorial Association; cost $2,000. A uniformed Confederate soldier stands on picket duty, holding his musket by the barrel on his proper right side, the butt of which rests by his proper right foot. The soldier wears a hat and a short cloak over a knee-length jacket. Inscription: "Our Confederate dead, / whom power could not corrupt, / whom death could not terrify, / whom defeat could not dishonor. // (Back of base) It is not in mortals / to command success. / But they did more, deserved it."
  - Marker for Confederate Hospitals, on Courthouse Square (1955). Text: "In Newnan between 1862 and 1865 were seven Confederate hospitals — Bragg, Buckner, "College Temple", "Coweta House," Foard, Gamble and Pinson's Springs. More than 10,000 Confederate sick and wounded and about 200 Federal soldiers wounded in the Battle of Brown's Mill were cared for in these hospitals and in private homes. The hospitals were directed and supervised by Samuel H. Stout, Army Medical Director Department of Tennessee. Loyal men and women of the county rendered valuable aid."
- Ocilla: Irwin County Confederate Monument (1911)
- Oglethorpe: Confederate Monument, Courthouse lawn (1923) "Erected by the Oglethorpe Chapter of the UDC in 1924. It consists of a block of Ga marble flanked by marble globes surmounted by a third globe (surrounded by a fence), sits near the courthouse, date on monument is February 20, 1993, but newspaper establishes date of dedication as April 26, 1924. Originally, it was built with a fountain near an old artesian well in the intersection of highway 49 and Sumpter Street and moved to the present site around 1935."
- Perry: Houston County Confederate Monument (1908)
- Quitman: Confederate memorial, Brooks County Courthouse
- Sparta: Hancock County Confederate Monument (1881)
- Statesboro: Confederate Memorial, Bulloch County Courthouse (1906)
- Thomaston:
  - At Arms Rest Monument, Upson County Courthouse (1908)
  - First Cannon Ball Monument, Upson County Courthouse (1919)
- Thomson: McDuffie and Columbia Counties Confederate Monument, McDuffie County Courthouse (1986)
- Toccoa: Stephens County Confederate Monument, county courthouse (1922)
- Valdosta: Confederate memorial, Lowdnes County Courthouse (1911)
- Vienna: Dooly County Confederate Monument, county courthouse (1908)
- Warrenton: Warren County Confederate Monument, county courthouse (1904)
- Washington: The Dissolution of the Confederate Government/Last Meeting Stone, Wilkes County Courthouse (1938)
- Watkinsville: Confederate monument (1927); first erected in Watkinsville City Park
- Wrightsville: Jefferson Davis Highway Marker located in front of the Johnson County Courthouse
  - Wrightsville - Confederate Soldier memorial by Sons of Confederate Veterans

=== Other public monuments ===
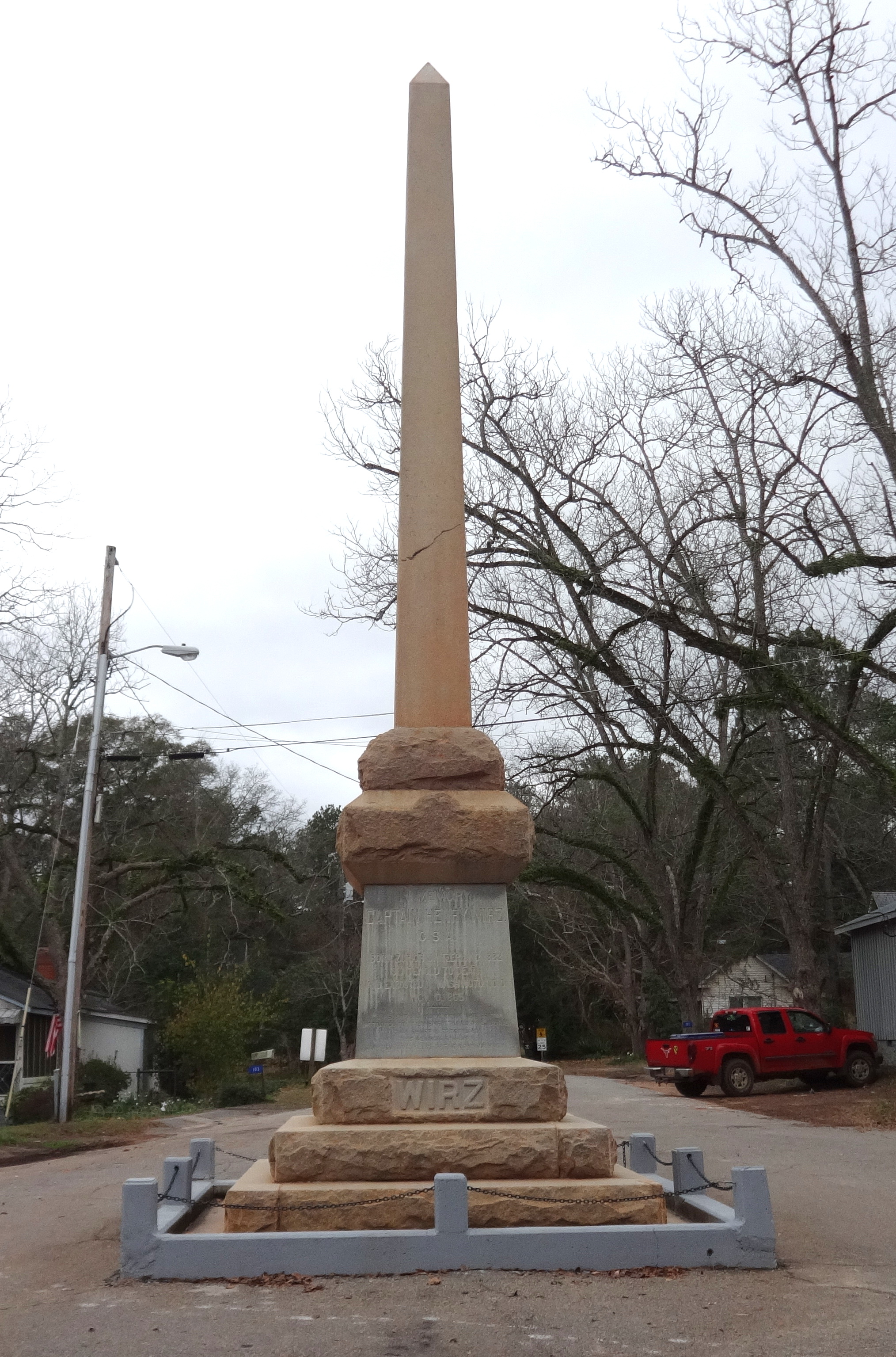
Henry Wirz memorial, Andersonville

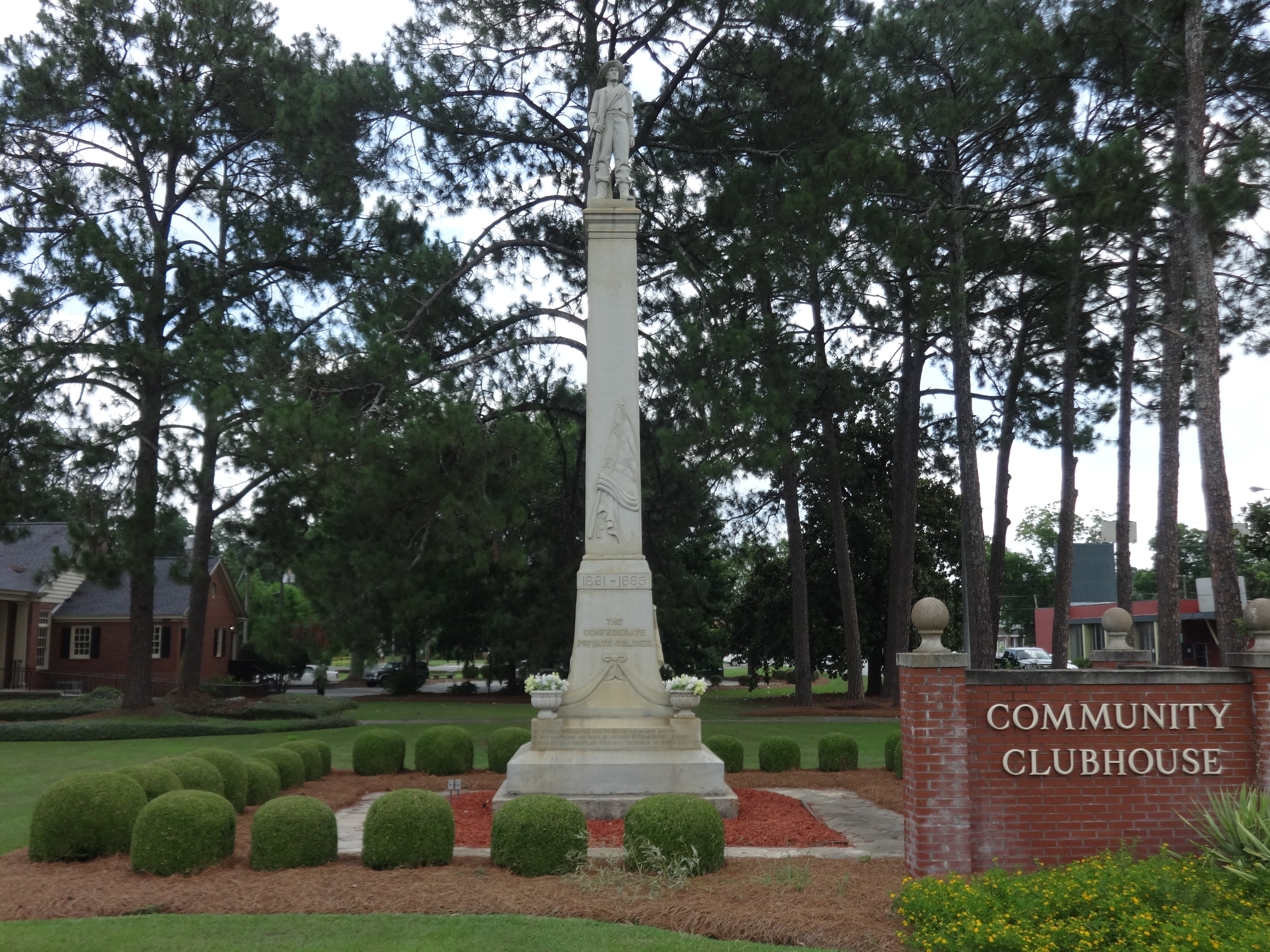
Crisp County Confederate Monument, Cordele

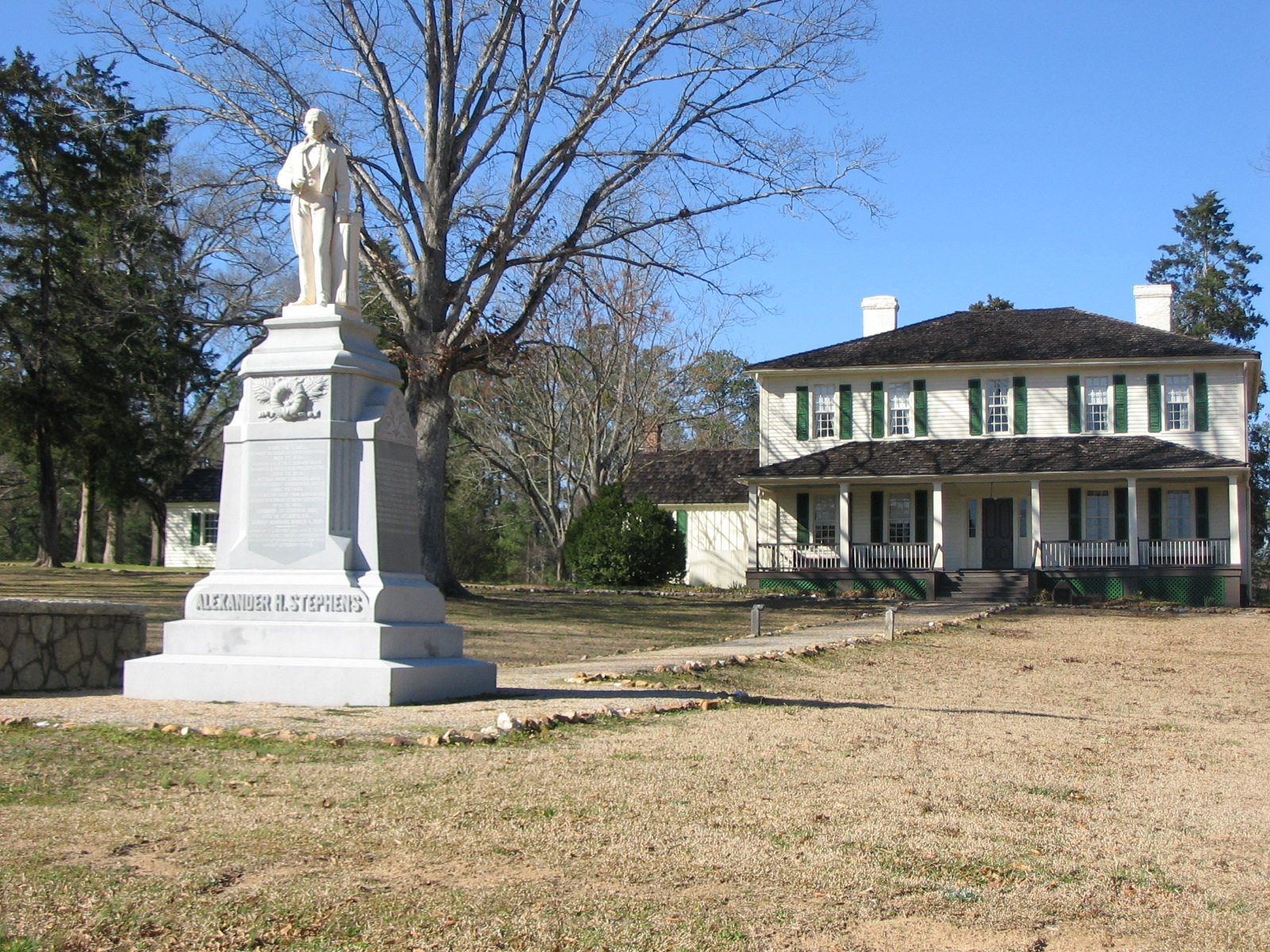
Alexander H. Stephens statue, A. H. Stephens Historic Park, Crawfordville

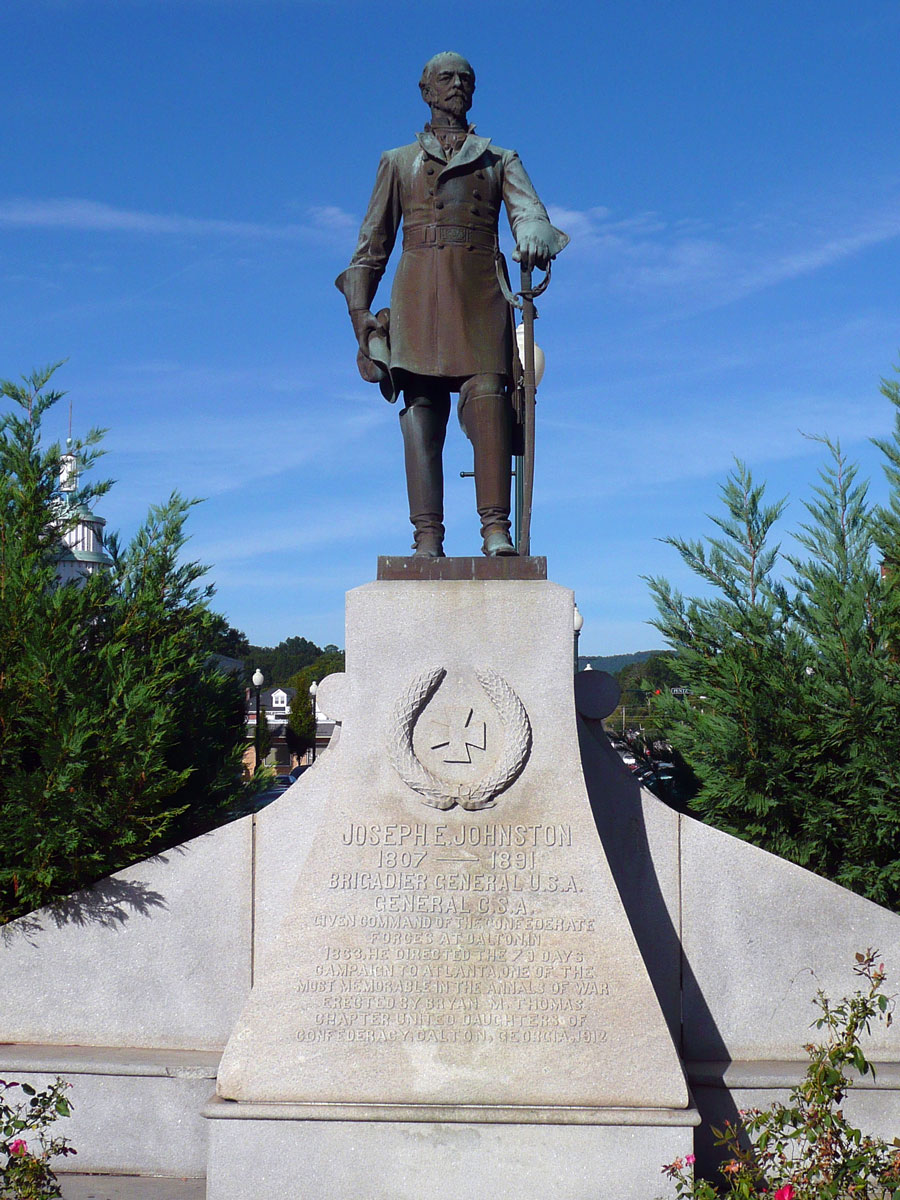
Joseph E. Johnston, Dalton

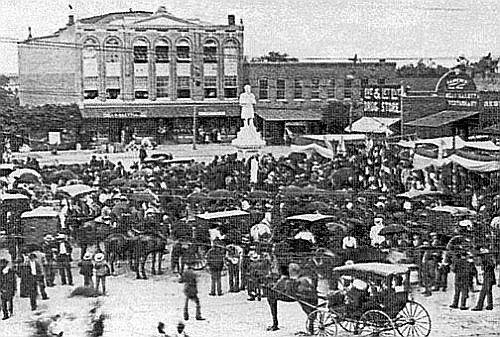
Unveiling of "Dutchy", Elberton

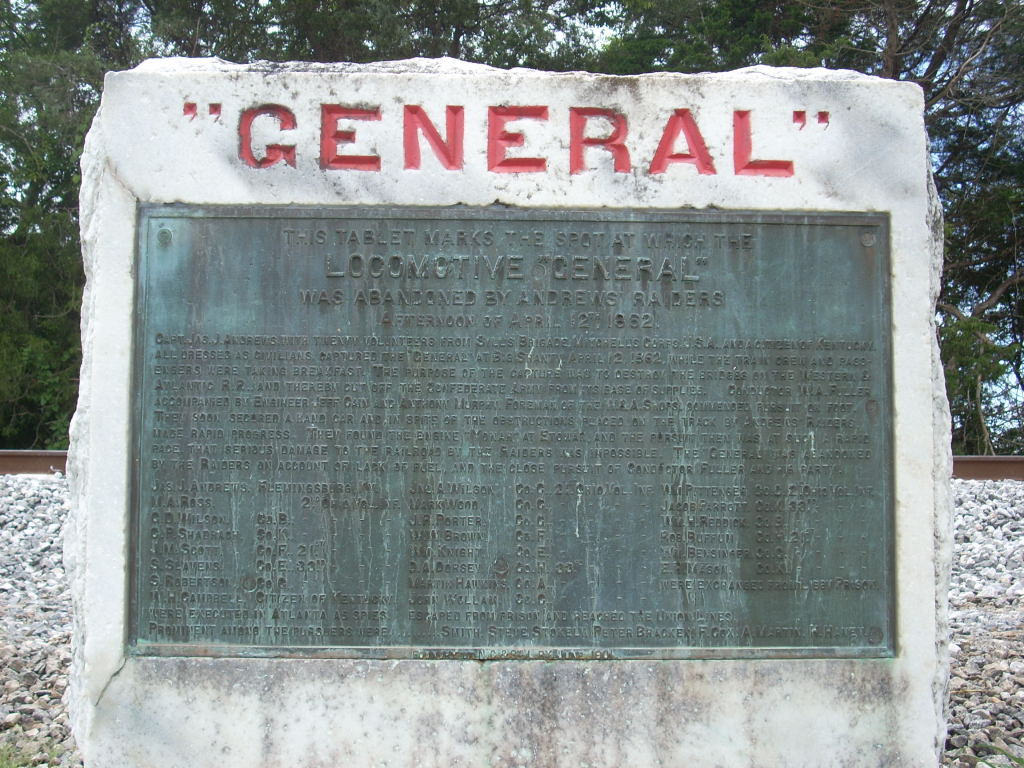
Monument to the Great Locomotive Chase, Ringgold

- Abbeville: Confederate Memorial Monument (1909)
- Americus: Confederate Monument (1900)
- Andersonville: Andersonville National Historic Site: Monument to Henry Wirz, Commander of the Confederate prison, Camp Sumter, at Andersonville, "where approximately thirteen thousand Union troops...died of disease, starvation, and exposure." Erected by UDC in 1909.
- Athens: Athens Confederate Monument (1872)
- Atlanta
  - Jefferson Davis Highway Marker, on East College Avenue near South McDonough St. Marked U.D.C. (United Daughters of the Confederacy), June 12, 1931.
  - CSA Brig. Gen. Alfred Iverson Jr. Monument
  - Oakland Cemetery
    - Confederate Obelisk, inscribed "Our Confederate Dead 1873", in the Confederate section of the cemetery. Made of Stone Mountain granite, it is the tallest object in the Cemetery. In 2019 the city decided to add e marker contextualizing its continued placement on state-owned property.
    - Lion of the Confederacy, also known as the Lion of Atlanta, inscribed "Unknown Confederate Dead". Created to memorialize "the lost cause", the monument is a copy of the Lion of Lucerne. The statue was carved by T. M. Brady, who owned the Georgia Marble Finishing Works in Canton. Surrounded by the bodies of an estimated 3,000 unnamed Confederate soldiers, it was commissioned by the Atlanta Ladies Memorial Association and dedicated on Confederate Memorial Day in 1894." In 2019, the city of Atlanta added a marker contextualizing its continued placement on state-owned property. The face of the Georgia monument was destroyed by protesters during the first week of June 2020. On August 18, 2021, the statue was removed due to frequent vandalism.
  - Peachtree Battle Avenue Monument (1935), a stone-engraved memorial commemorating the Battle of Peachtree Creek (1864). Because state law prohibits its removal, a panel was added in 2019 saying: "[The monument] describes the United States after the civil war as a perfected nation. This ignores the segregation and disenfranchisement of African Americans and others that still existed in 1935."
  - Peace Monument (1911), Allen George Newman, sculptor, inside the 14th Street gate of Piedmont Park. Features a winged goddess declaring "Cease Firing – Peace Is Proclaimed," to a Confederate soldier holding a rifle. Defaced by protestors after the Charlottesville Unite the Right rally, on August 13, 2017. A committee set up by then-Mayor Kasim Reed in 2017 recommended it be removed. Since state law prohibits removal, a "contextual" panel was added in 2019, stating that the monument "excludes all African Americans, of which nearly 200,000 served in the U.S. Army".
  - Rhodes Hall, formerly a private mansion, features a set of stained-glass windows entitled "The Rise and Fall of the Confederacy."
  - Sidney Lanier Monument (1914), a stele and bust honoring Sidney Lanier, a former Confederate soldier and the "Poet of the Confederacy".
  - W.H.T. Walker Monument, on the spot where he was shot and killed by a Union sniper. At intersection of Wilkinson Drive and Glenwood Avenue. One half mile to the west, at the intersection of Monument and McPherson Avenues, is a memorial erected by the U.S. Army for Major General John B. McPherson on the spot at which he was killed by Confederate forces on the same day (July 22, 1864, during the Battle of Atlanta).
  - Westview Cemetery Memorial. Marks the site of the Battle of Ezra Church. A soldier on an obelisk, above two small stone cannons and cannonballs. Inscribed "Nation shall not lift sword against nation" (Isaiah 2:4). Confederate flag flown, along with U.S. and Georgia flags.
  - Eternal Flame of the Confederacy Monument (1939), a pre-Civil War gas streetlamp that was part of the Atlanta premiere of the film Gone with the Wind, now at the Atlanta History Center. Its plaque reads:
    The Eternal Flame of the Confederacy
    Lighted during the "Gone with the Wind" festivities, December 14, 1939 by the Old Guard Battalion of the Gate City Guard.

The Gate City Guard was "a Confederate-era city militia". The streetlamp was originally located at the corner of Alabama and Whitehall (now Peachtree) Streets, and was moved several times prior to its installation in Underground Atlanta. Redevelopment of that area led the city to want to remove it. Since it was valued at less than $500, the Georgia law controlling historic monuments did not apply. The Atlanta History Center purchased the streetlamp for $10.

- Augusta
  - Augusta Confederate Monument. Commissioned by the Ladies Memorial Association in 1875, erected in 1878. Life-size statues of Confederate Generals Robert E. Lee, Stonewall Jackson, T.R.R. Cobb and W.H.T. Walker surround the base of this monument.
  - Four Southern Poets Monument, unveiled in April 1913. Commemorates Paul Hamilton Hayne (1830–1886), Sidney Lanier (1842–1881), James Ryder Randall (1839–1908), and Abram Joseph Ryan (1838–1886). All four poets are associated with the Confederate States of America.
- Baxley: Confederate memorial
- Brunswick: Confederate memorial in Hanover Square. This monument was removed on May 17, 2022, and although the City Commission voted to remove it in 2020 the final action was delayed due to legal tension. The monument is currently awaiting final relocation to Confederate Soldiers Park in Waynesville.
- Calhoun: Confederate Soldier and Memorial Arch (1927).
- Canton: Confederate Memorial Arch, Brown Park (1923).
- Cochran: Bleckley County Confederate Monument, old Cochran City School (1910).
- Cockspur Island: Immortal Six Hundred at Fort Pulaski National Monument
- Columbus:
  - Confederate Monument, city street median (1879).
  - Tyler Home – Ladies Aid Society Memorial, Veteran's Parkway (1936).
- Commerce: UDC monument (1941) in Spencer Park to women and veterans of the War Between the States. High school students sang Dixie at the dedication ceremony.
- Cordele: Crisp County Confederate Monument, community clubhouse (1911).
- Crawfordville: Alexander H. Stephens statue (1893), A. H. Stephens Historic Park, Crawfordville
- Cuthbert: Randolph County Confederate Monument, city park (1910).
- Dalton: Two memorials to CSA Gen. Joseph E. Johnston:
  - Johnson statue (1912) in downtown Dalton. The UDC commissioned Belle Kinney to sculpt the bronze statue, in which Johnston is posed with "an expression of deep thought, with his sword resting at his feet". Kinney explained, "General Johnston, in command of an army vastly inferior in numbers to General Sherman's army, had to use his brains more than his sword; hence I made the sword subservient to the brain."
  - Memorial plaque at Johnston Headquarters, Huff House
- Decatur: DeKalb County Confederate Monument. Obelisk located behind Old DeKalb County Courthouse on Decatur Square. The monument has been defaced several times. A petition is calling for its removal. According to the DeKalb County Commission, part of the problem is that no one wants it. "The county has spent months trying to find takers for the monument. Officials purchased advertisements and cold called museums and parks." Removed in 2020 following George Floyd protests.
- Douglas: Confederate memorial, corner of Peterson Avenue (U.S. Route 441 southbound) and Ward Street (U.S. Route 221 Business westbound).
- Eatonton: Eatonton Confederate Monument, median in front of the Putnam County Courthouse (1908).
- Elberton:
  - "Dutchy" (dedicated 1898; removed 1900; placed on display in Elberton 1982). Wanting to promote its granite industry and honor the Lost Cause, Elberton commissioned an Italian immigrant who "had clearly never seen a Confederate soldier" to sculpt a 3,000 lb (1,400 kg) granite monument. Unveiled in 1898, the sculpture had a cartoonish face, bulbous eyes, and appeared to be wearing a Union Army uniform. Nicknamed "Dutchy" because it looked like a cross between a Pennsylvania Dutchman and a hippopotamus, the monument was pulled down and buried where it fell in the town square in 1900. The sculpture was exhumed in 1982, run through a local car wash, and then placed on display in the Elberton Granite Museum, where it remains.
  - Elbert County Confederate Memorial (1898), Elberton Town Plaza
- Fort Oglethorpe: Chickamauga & Chattanooga National Military Park. Numerous monuments and memorials to Confederate soldiers and units, as well as Union monuments.
- Franklin: Heard County Confederate Monument, Veterans Park (1999).
- Gainesville:
  - "Old Joe", Hall County Confederate Monument, town square (1909).
  - A totem pole honoring local Confederate soldiers was erected in 1936 at Redwine Methodist Church. The monument no longer exists.
  - Statue of CSA General James Longstreet at his home
- Gray: Memorial to soldiers in the War Between the States and the World War.
- Griffin: Confederate Monument, Veterans Memorial Plaza (1909).
- Hamilton: Memorial honoring Confederate dead.
- Hawkinsville: Confederate Sons of America memorial (Confederate States of America?)
- Jefferson: Confederate memorial in the downtown.
- Jeffersonville: Confederate Memorial, across the street from the Twiggs County Courthouse (1911).
- Kingston: First Confederate Hospital of the Civil War, Main Street.
- LaFayette: Walker County Confederate Monument, John B. Gordon Hall (1909).
- LaGrange: Monument to the Confederate Soldier, median (1902).
- Lincolnton: Lincoln County Confederate Monument, center of town.
- Macon: Bibb County Confederate Monument, triangle park downtown (1879). Moved to present location in 1956.
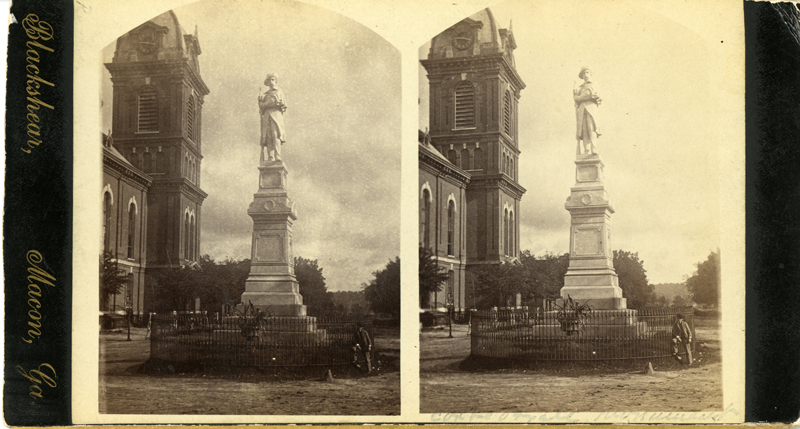
  Confederate Monument in Macon, GA, c. 1870s
- Madison: Morgan County Confederate Monument, Hill Park (1909).
- Marietta: Confederate memorial (1908), Marietta Confederate Cemetery
- McDonough: Confederate Memorial, courthouse square (1910)
- Milledgeville: Confederate Memorial Fountain, downtown median, erected by United Daughters of the Confederacy (1912). 20 feet (6.1 m) fall. Originally across from Post Office and Courthouse; later moved to street in front of Georgia Military College. "On the front is 'CSA' and the furled battle flag with a broken shaft. Under the lion's head is a covered bowl. The soldier is standing with a gun. His heroism in the presence of the conquering foe was equaled only by his generosity to his fallen enemy. Reading around the monument, starting in the back it reads: '1861'; To the memory of the Confederate soldier who's [sic] game is as imperishable as the everlasting hills, who's [sic] courage is as unrivaled. Sing the dawn of civilization who's [sic] name shines in undying glory to the pages of history this monument is lovingly erected by the Robert E. Lee Chapter Daughters of the Confederacy of Milledgeville, Georgia. Unconquerable patriotism and – self-sacrifice rendered, adopted the effort of his enemies. After his flag had folded forever, to destroy his proud inheritance."
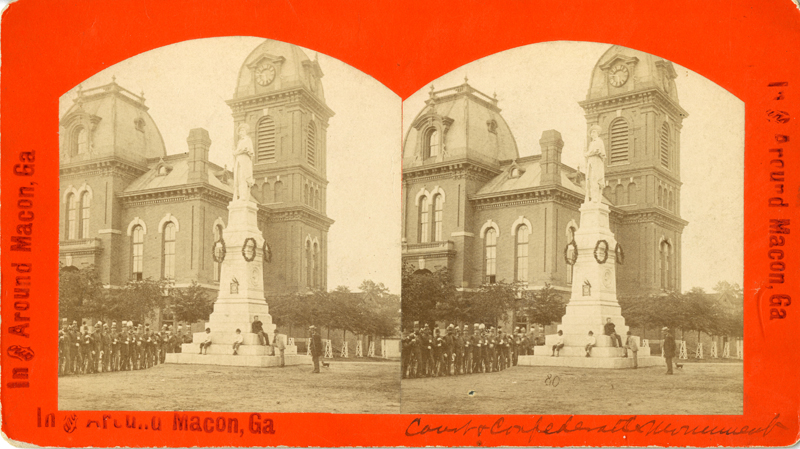
- Bibb County Courthouse and Confederate Monument in Macon, GA c.1870s
  Montezuma: Macon County Confederate Monument (1911). "The first Macon County monument is currently located in Fannie Carmichael Park and faces east. It is a soldier with both hands on his grounded rifle. There are lion heads on each side. It was erected by the Phil Cook Chapter of the UDC in January 1911. The monument was moved in 1965 from the middle of Dooly Street in the middle of Montezuma."
- Monticello: Jasper County Confederate Monument, City Square (1910). "To the Confederate soldiers of Jasper County, the record of whose sublime self sacrifice and undying devotion to duty, in the service of their country is the proud heritage of a local posterity."
- Newnan: Stone monument to William Thomas Overby, called "Nathan Hale" of the Confederacy (1956). Erected 1956 by Alfred Colquitt and Newnan Chapters UDC. "
- Resaca Confederate Cemetery
- Richmond Hill: Equestrian statue of Gen. Robert E. Lee, located in J. F. Gregory City Park.
- Ringgold:
  - Statue of CSA Gen. Patrick Cleburne
  - "General" (1901), monument erected at the location where Confederate locomotive The General—stolen by Union Army soldiers in 1862—was finally stopped following the Great Locomotive Chase
- Sandersville: "There is a large wooden cross on a three stepped stone base dedicated by the Ladies Memorial Association in the cemetery. It was intended to serve as a tribute to Confederate war dead until a marble memorial could be erected. Now, a marble obelisk dates from 1897 (the year the local UDC chapter came about) in the Sandersville cemetery."

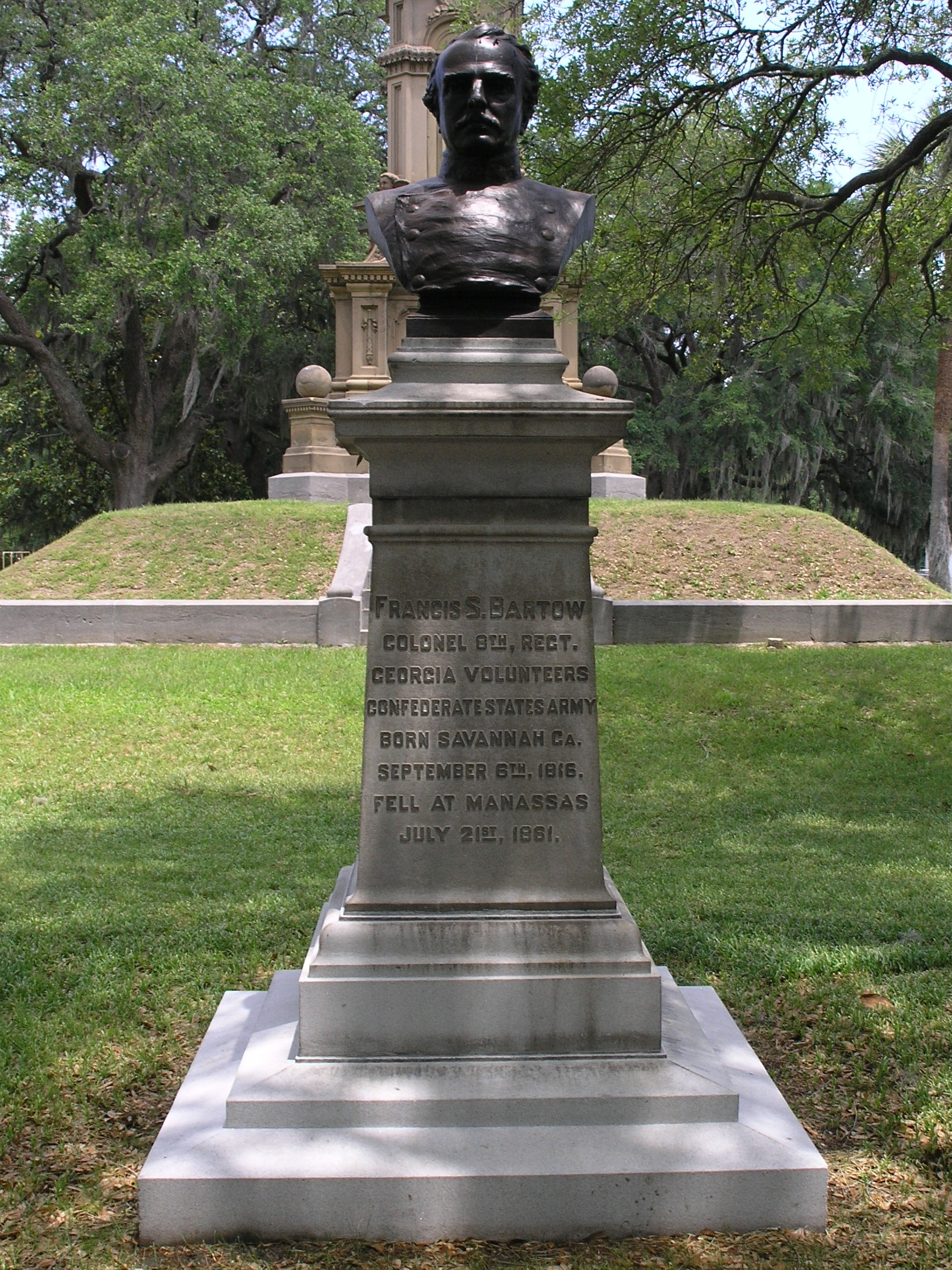
Francis S. Bartow in Savannah, Georgia

- Savannah:
  - Colonel Francis S. Bartow Bust, Forsyth Park (1902).
  - Confederate Monument, Forsyth Park (1879) (To be officially renamed "Civil War Monument" in 2018)
  - General Lafayette McLaws Bust, Forsyth Park (1902).
  - Silence, city-owned Laurel Grove Cemetery (1875).
- Springfield: Confederate Memorial, across from Effington County Courthouse (1923).
- Talbotton: Confederate memorial
- Tennille: "A Confederate monument was dedicated in April 1917 by the J.D. Franklin Chapter of the UDC. It originally stood in a park called the square in the middle of the town and was originally a fountain with bowls on four sides of an eight-foot shaft. The Confederate battle flag is incised on the shaft. It is currently located at the police station."
- Thomson: Monument to the Women of the Sixties, McDuffie County Chamber of Commerce (1911).
- Tifton: Tift County Confederate Memorial, Fulwood Park (1910), rededicated 1992.
- Trenton: Confederate Memorial in Veterans Park next to the town square.
- Union Point:
  - Confederate Reunion Memorial, along city sidewalk (1874).
  - Confederate Wayside Home Monument, wide median (1936).
- Waycross: Ware County Confederate, Phoenix Park (1910).
- Waynesboro: Confederate Memorial Cemetery, burial site of 49 Confederate soldiers
- Waynesville: Confederate Soldiers Park

=== Private monuments ===
- Albany: Confederate Memorial Park, owned and maintained by SCV and UDC.
- Augusta: Confederate Monument at St. James United Methodist Church.
- Rome: Confederate monuments at Myrtle Hill Cemetery include:
  - Nathan Bedford Forrest Monument
  - Rome Confederate Monument
  - Women of the Confederacy

==== Gallery ====
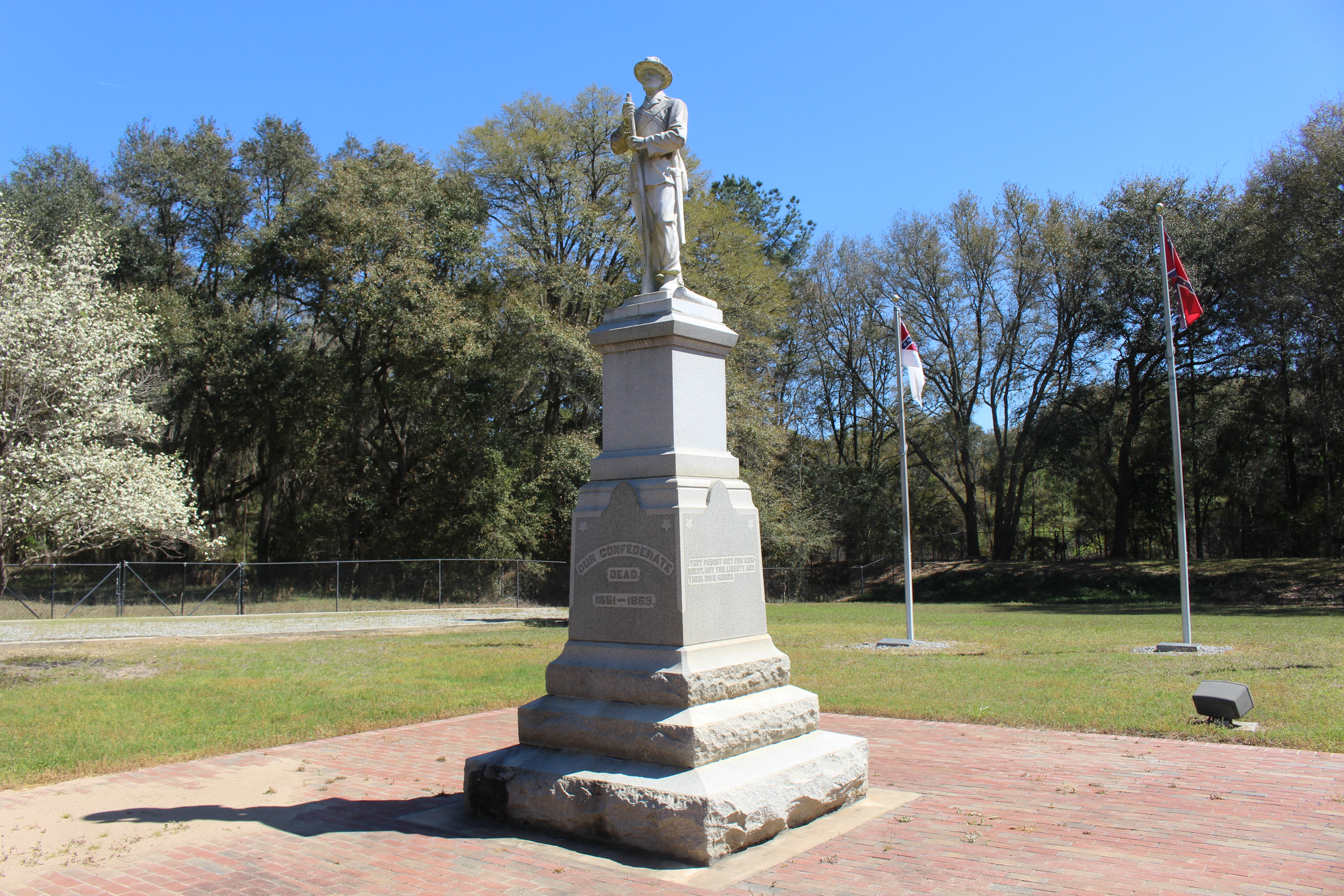
Confederate Memorial Park, Albany

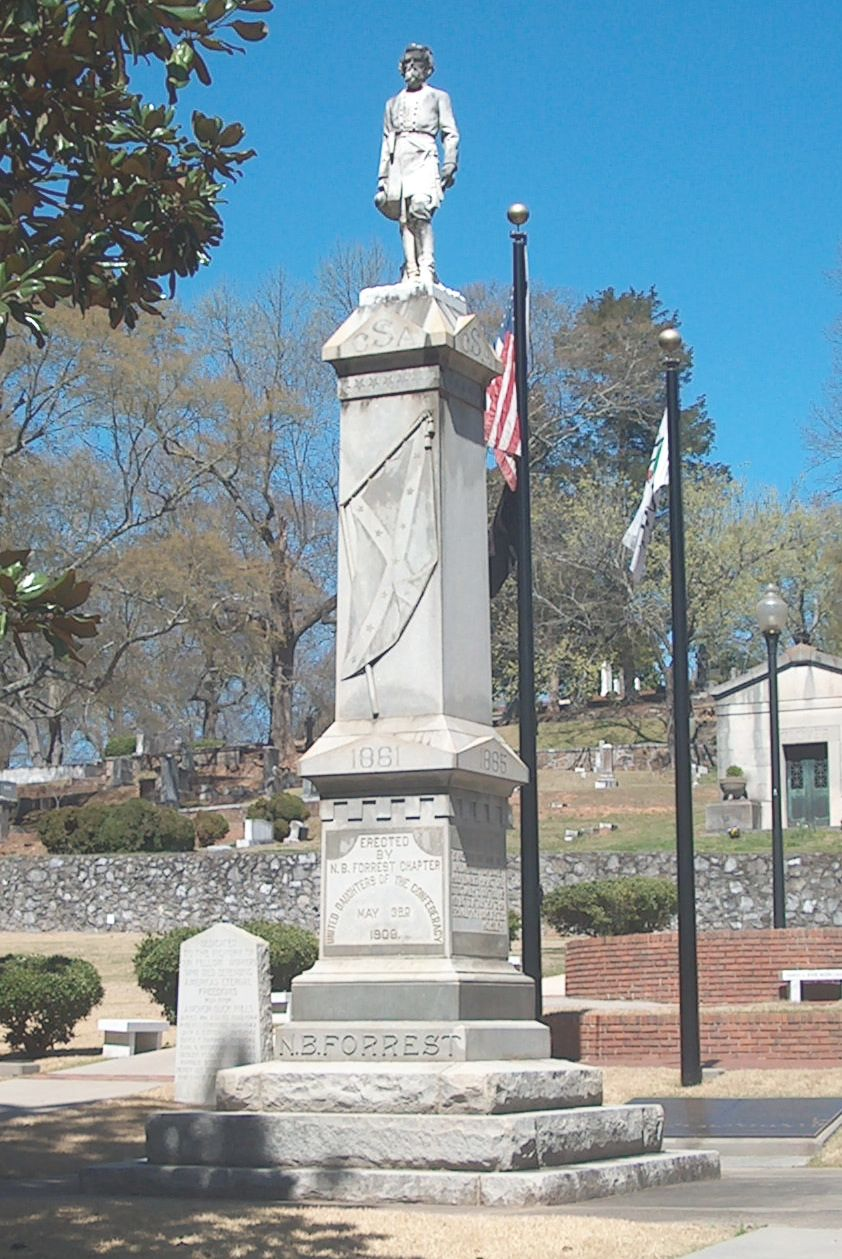
Nathan Bedford Forrest Monument, Myrtle Hill Cemetery, Rome

== Inhabited places ==
- Bartow, renamed for Francis S. Bartow in 1861.
- Bartow County, named for CSA Gen. Francis S. Bartow.
- Ben Hill County, named for CSA Sen. Benjamin Harvey Hill.
- Bleckley County, named for Logan Edwin Bleckley.
- Cook County, named for CSA Brig. Gen. Philip Cook.
- Jeff Davis County, named for CSA President Jefferson Davis.
- Lamar County, named for Lucius Quintus Cincinnatus Lamar II.
- Lanier County, named for Confederate poet and soldier Sidney Lanier.
- Stephens County, named for Alexander H. Stephens, Vice President of the Confederate States of America.
- Toombs County, named for Robert Toombs, first Sec. of State of the Confederate States of America.
- Wheeler County, named for CSA Gen. Joseph Wheeler.

== Parks ==
- Catoosa County: monument (1977) to Confederate Gen. Bushrod Johnson, located within Chickamauga and Chattanooga National Military Park.
- Cobb County: Kennesaw Mountain National Battlefield Park, tribute to 14 generals from Georgia (1917)
- Irwin County: Jefferson Davis Memorial Historic Site (1920)

== Public works ==
- Muscogee: Stonewall Jackson Dam

== Roads ==
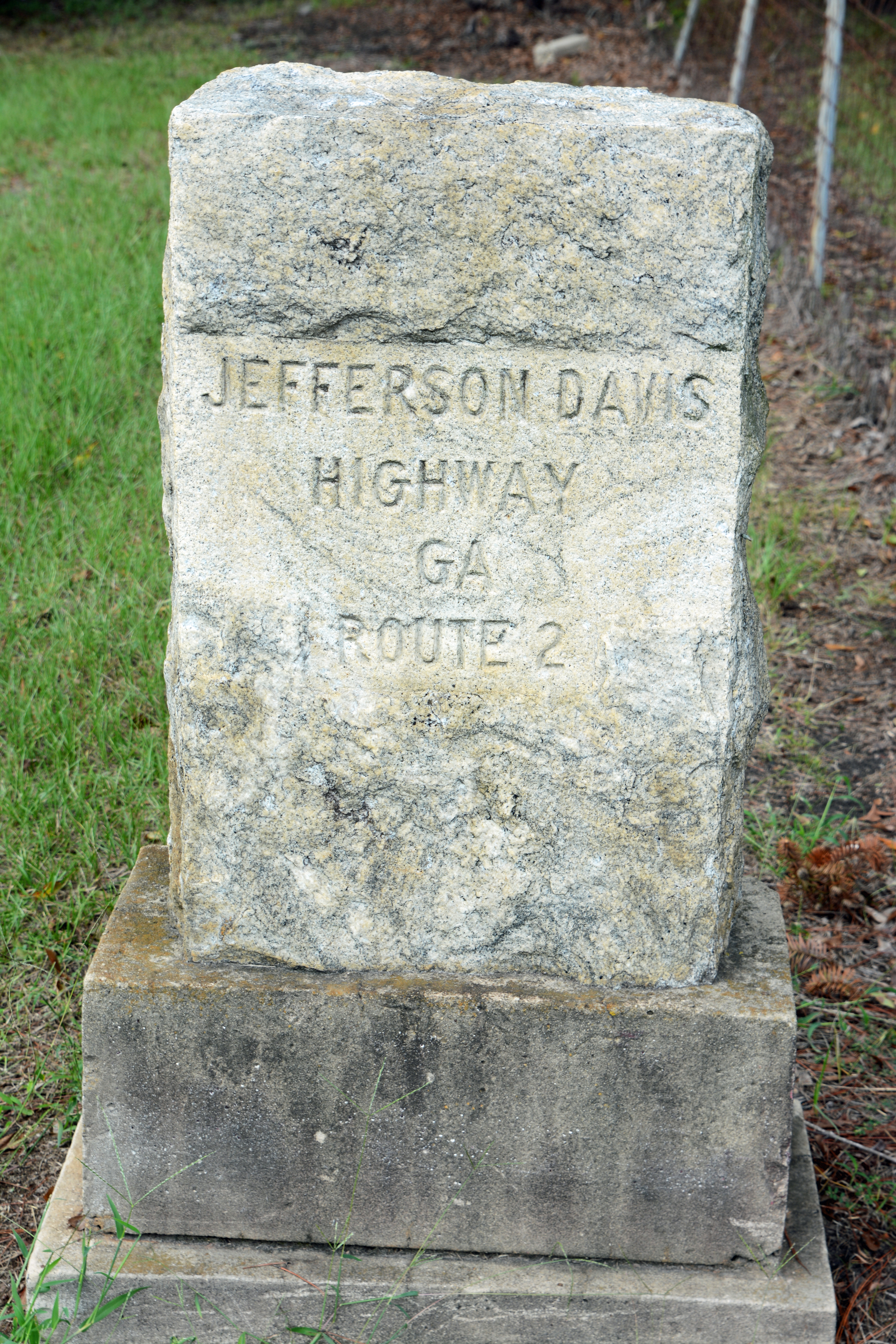
Jefferson Davis Highway marker in Irwin County

- Andersonville: Robert E. Lee Street
- Atlanta
  - Cleburne Avenue and Cleburne Terrace, named for Confederate major general Patrick Cleburne
  - Confederate Avenue and East Confederate Avenue. Renamed to United Avenue and United Avenue S.E. on October 3, 2018
  - Confederate Court. Renamed Trestletree Court on October 3, 2018.
  - Forrest Street, named for Nathan Bedford Forrest, a CSA general and founder of the Ku Klux Klan. Forrest Avenue was renamed in 1980.
  - Gordon Place, named for Confederate general John B. Gordon
  - Hardee Circle and Hardee Street, named for Confederate general William J. Hardee
  - Holtzclaw Street, named for Confederate general James T. Holtzclaw
  - Memorial Drive, links downtown Atlanta with the Confederate Memorial at Stone Mountain
  - Walker Street, named for Confederate general James George Walker
- Augusta: Wheeler Road
- Brunswick: General Robert E. Lee Road
- Buford: General Lee Way
- Columbus: Robert E. Lee Drive
- Dallas: Confederate Avenue
- Eastman: Jefferson Davis Memorial Road
- Fayetteville
  - Jeff Davis Drive
  - Lanier Avenue
- Fitzgerald: (Note: Fitzgerald was formed in 1895 for veterans of the war, from the North and the South. Streets running north–south on the west side of the city were named after Confederate ships and generals, whereas the ones on the east side were named after Union ships and generals. See Fitzgerald, Georgia#History.)
  - Bragg Street
  - Gordon Street
  - Hill Street
  - Jackson Street
  - Jeff Davis Park Road
  - Lee Street
  - Logan Street
  - Longstreet Street
  - Thomas Street
- Forest Park:
  - Hood Avenue
  - Wheeler Drive
- Fort Oglethorpe:
  - Forrest Road
  - Polk Circle
  - Robert E. Lee Street
  - Shelby Street
- Franklin: Jeff Davis Road
- Gainesville: Longstreet Bridge
- Greensboro: Jefferson Davis Road
- Hazlehurst: Jeff Davis Street
- Jonesboro:
  - Jeb Stuart Drive
  - Jeff Davis Drive
  - Robert E. Lee Parkway
  - Stonewall Jackson Drive
- Kennesaw: Dreux Court, named for Confederate Colonel Charles Didier Dreux
- LaGrange: Ben Hill Street
- Lyons: Jeff Davis Avenue
- Macon:
  - General Lee Road
  - Jeff Davis Street
- Newnan:
  - General Lee Drive
  - General Longstreet Line
  - Jeb Stuart Drive
- Reynolds: John B. Gordon Road
- Ringgold: Robert E. Lee Drive
- Savannah:
  - Colonel Francis S. Bartow Bust
  - Early Street
  - Hampton Street
  - Jackson Boulevard
  - Johnston Boulevard
  - Lee Boulevard
  - McClaws Street
  - Mosby Street
  - Stuart Street
  - Wheeler Street
- Sharpsburg:
  - Bedford Forrest Drive
  - Thomas Overby Drive
- Stone Mountain:
  - Jefferson Davis Drive
  - Robert E. Lee Boulevard
  - Stonewall Jackson Drive
  - John B. Gordon Drive
- Thomaston: Jeff Davis Road, John b Gordon School road, John b Gordon spur, Lee street(east and west).
- Thomasville: John B. Gordon Spur
- Warner Robins: General Lee Road
- Washington: Robert Toombs Avenue
- Waycross:
  - Jeb Stuart Drive
  - Stonewall Jackson Place
- Chatham County: The Immortal Six Hundred Memorial Highway, a stretch of US 80 between Savannah and Tybee Island, near Fort Pulaski

== Schools ==
- Atlanta:
  - Joseph E. Brown Middle School- now Herman J. Russell West End Academy.
  - A granite memorial to the Confederacy is in front of E. Rivers Elementary School
  - Lanier University, short-lived university, first Baptist, then owned by the Ku Klux Klan for a year
- Brunswick: The Sidney Lanier Building (previously Sidney Lanier Elementary School) on the campus of Glynn Academy
- Buford: Lanier Middle School
- Gainesville: Lanier Elementary School
- Hazlehurst: Jeff Davis Elementary, High School, Middle School, and Primary School
- Marietta: Wheeler High School
- Oakwood: Lanier Technical College
- Sugar Hill: Lanier High School
- Thomaston: Robert E. Lee High School
- Zebulon: Jeff Davis Institute, a former school

== City symbols ==
- Trenton, Georgia: City council was upset the State's 1956 flag was being changed. Faced with the threat of a funding cut if they refused to fly the 2001 State flag, the city adopted a modified 1956 flag complete with the Confederate Battle Flag as their city flag in 2002. When the new mayor removed the city flag in 2004, objections were raised by the Sons of Confederate Veterans and a 2005 referendum confirmed the flag 278–64.
- Mount Zion, Georgia: Similarly to Trenton, added the confederate flag to their city flag after the state changed the flag.

== Photos ==
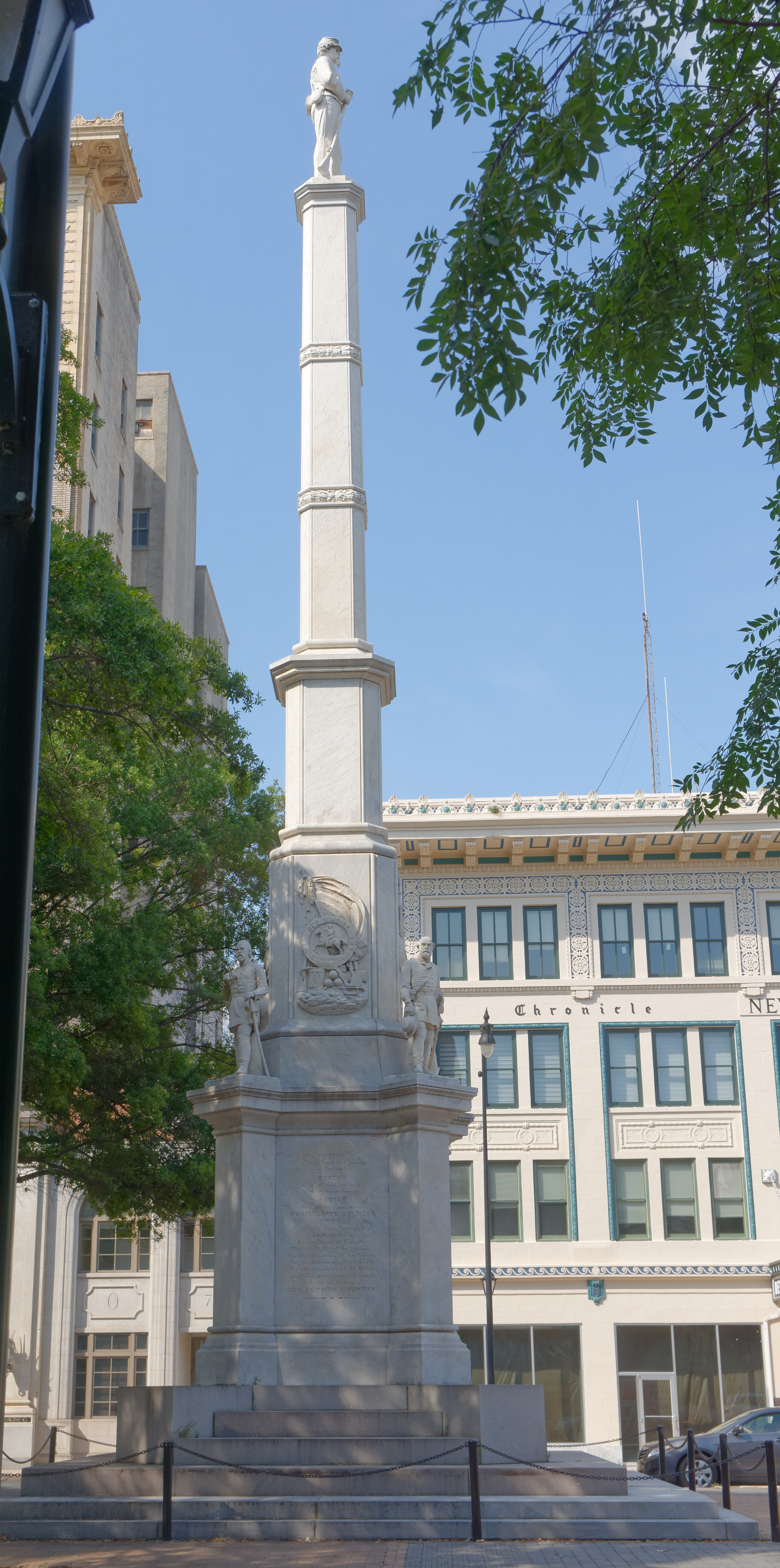
Augusta

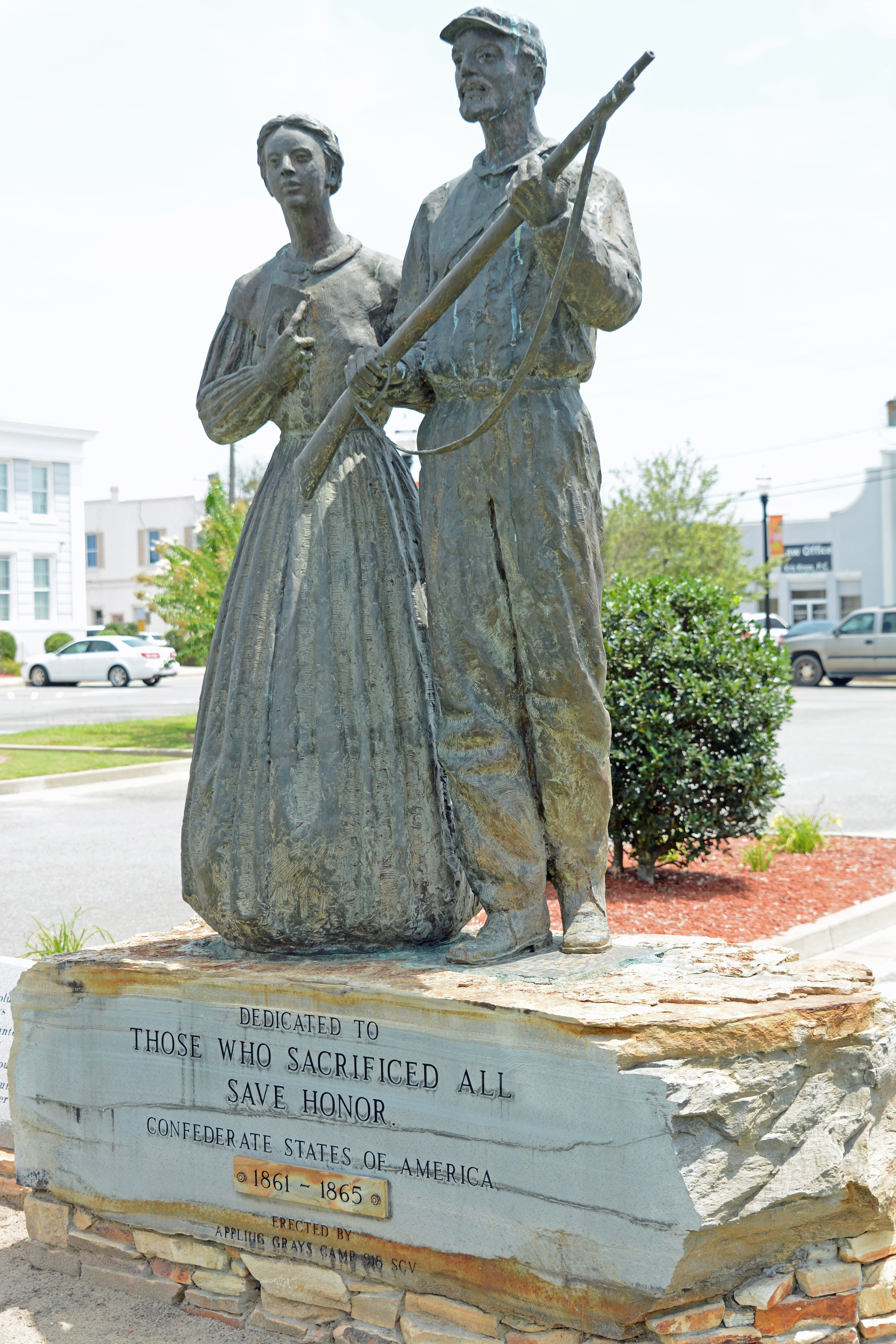
Baxley

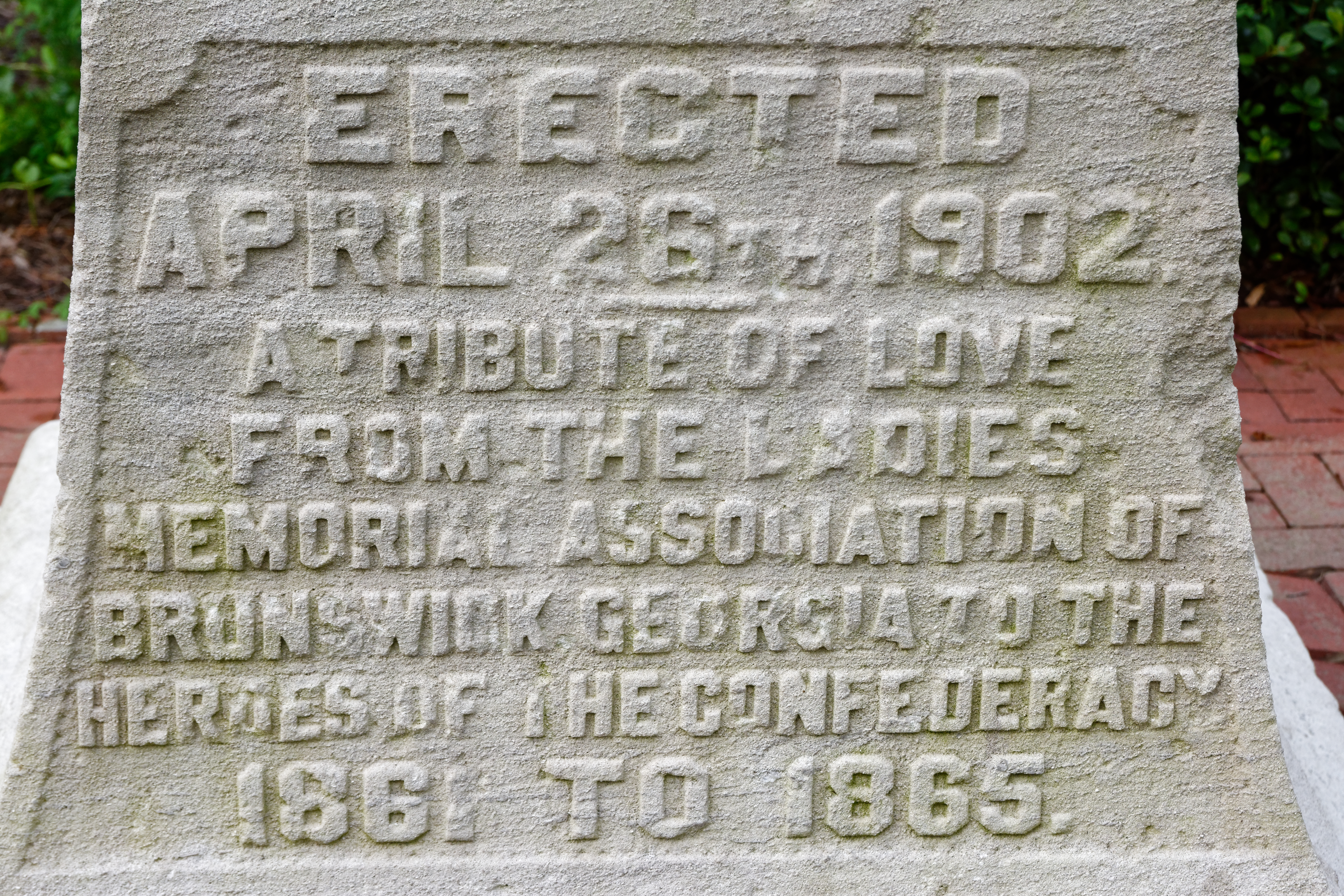
Brunswick

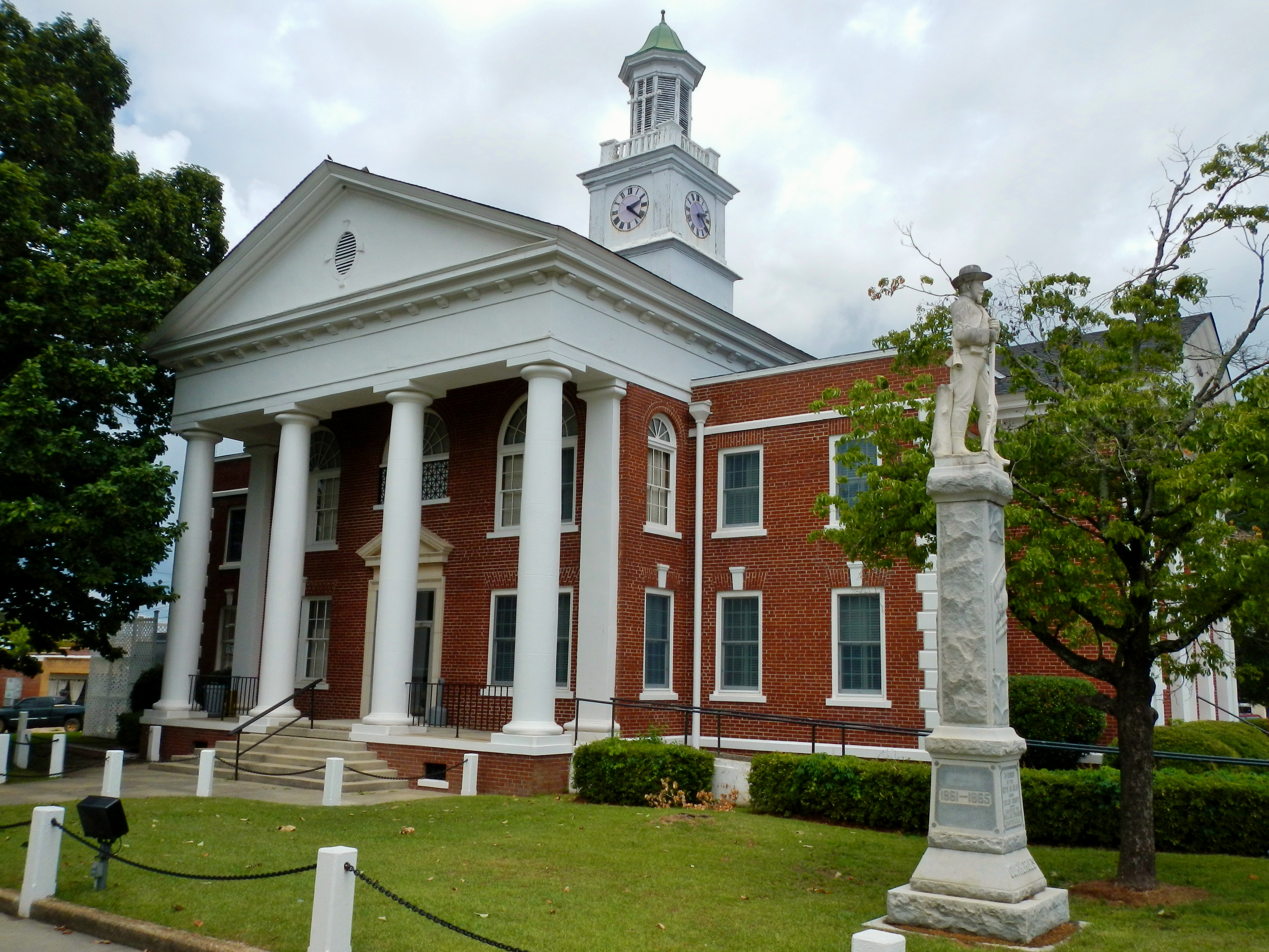
Butler

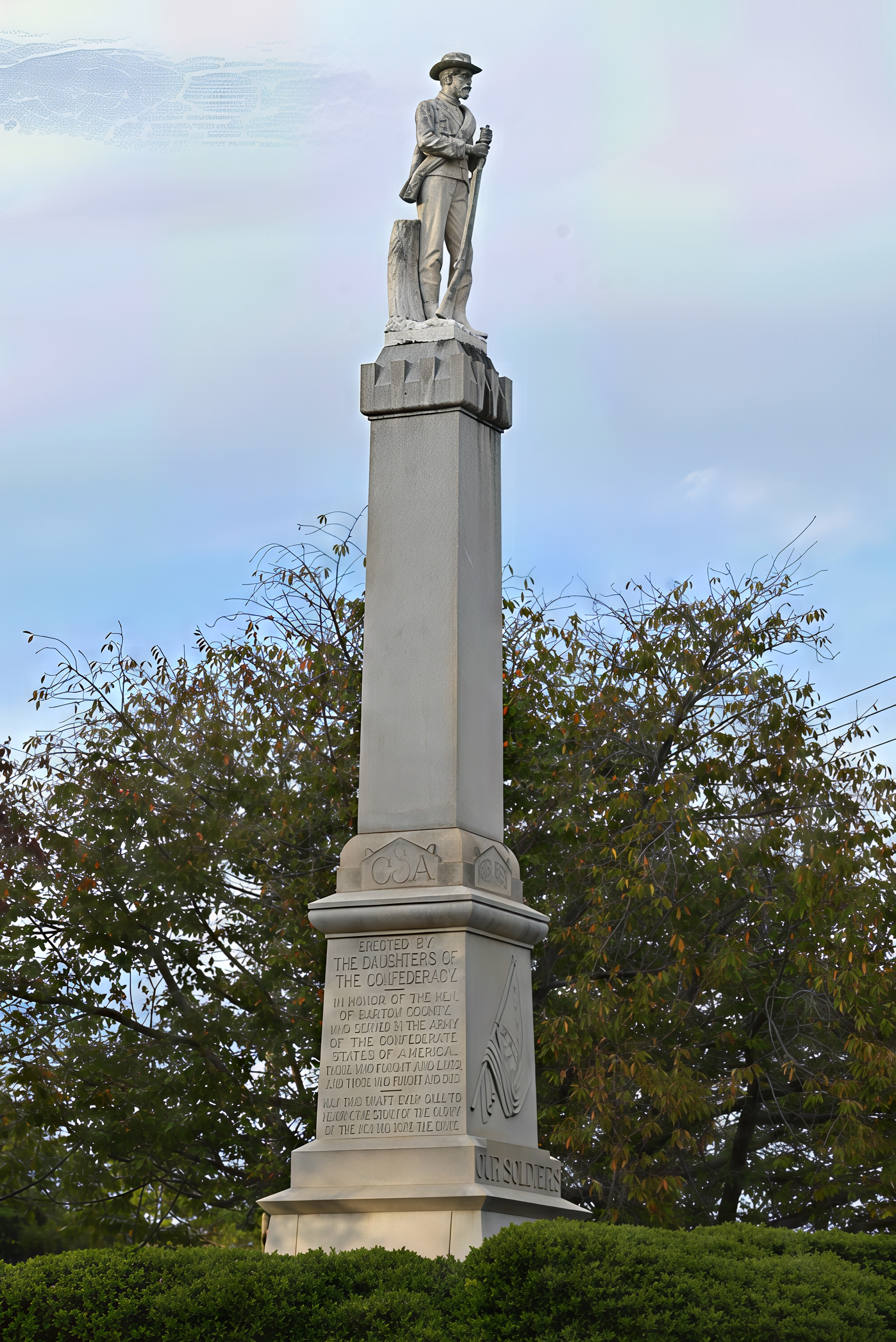
Cartersville

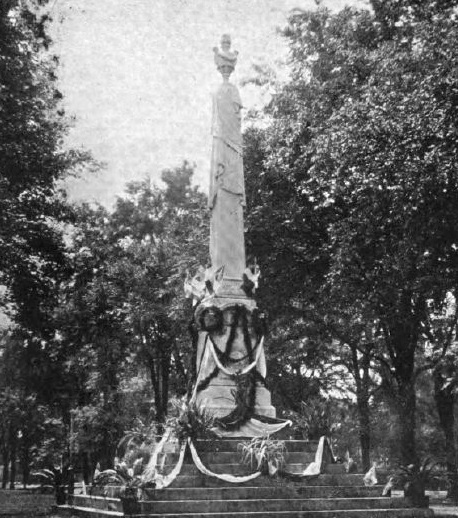
Columbus

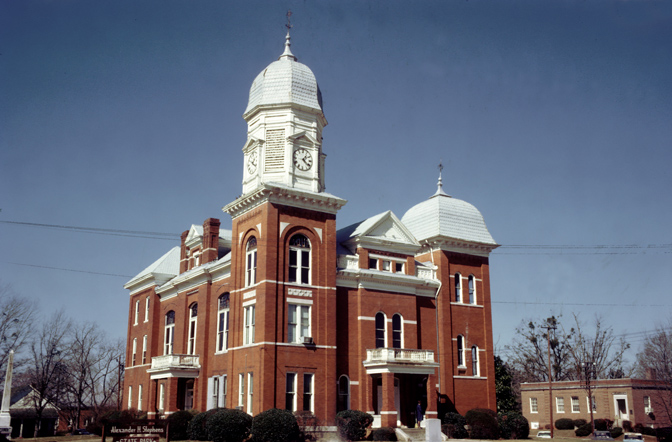
Crawfordville

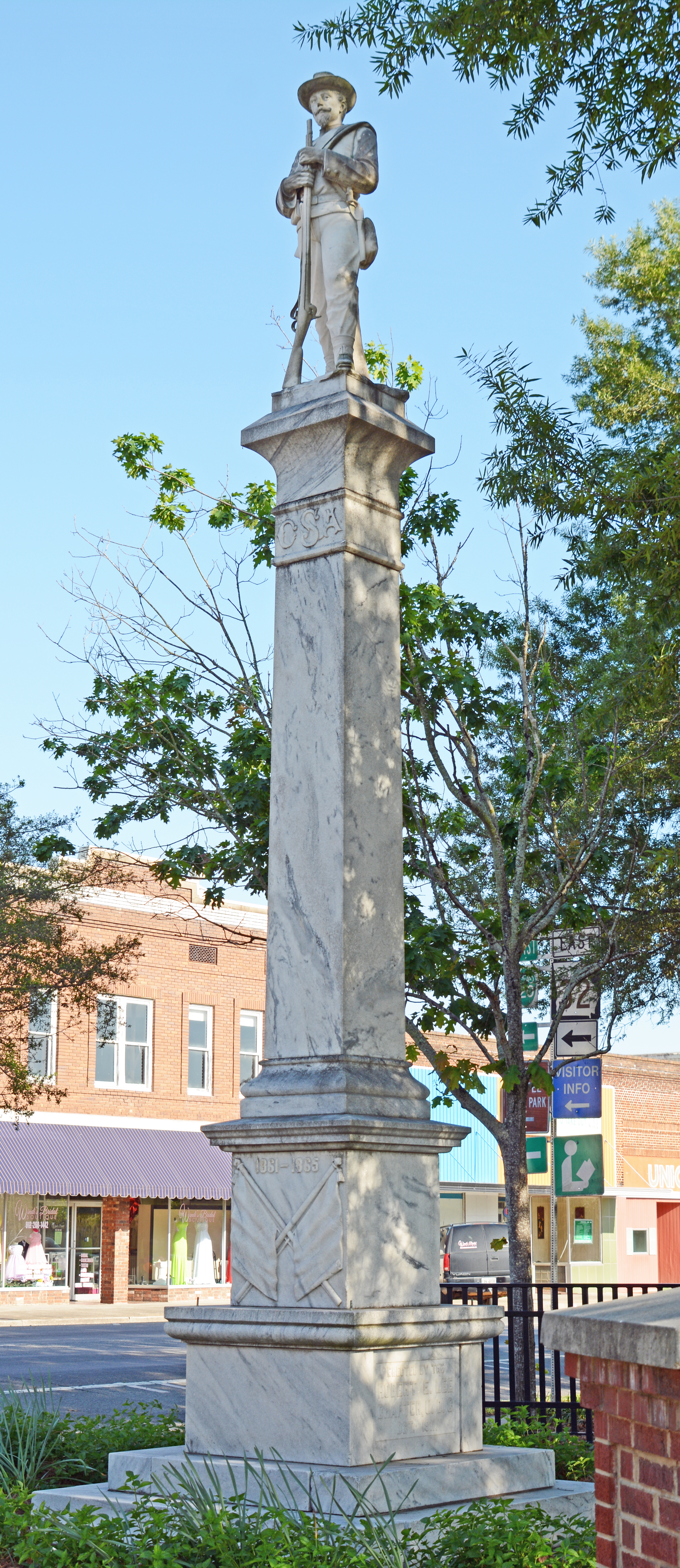
Douglas

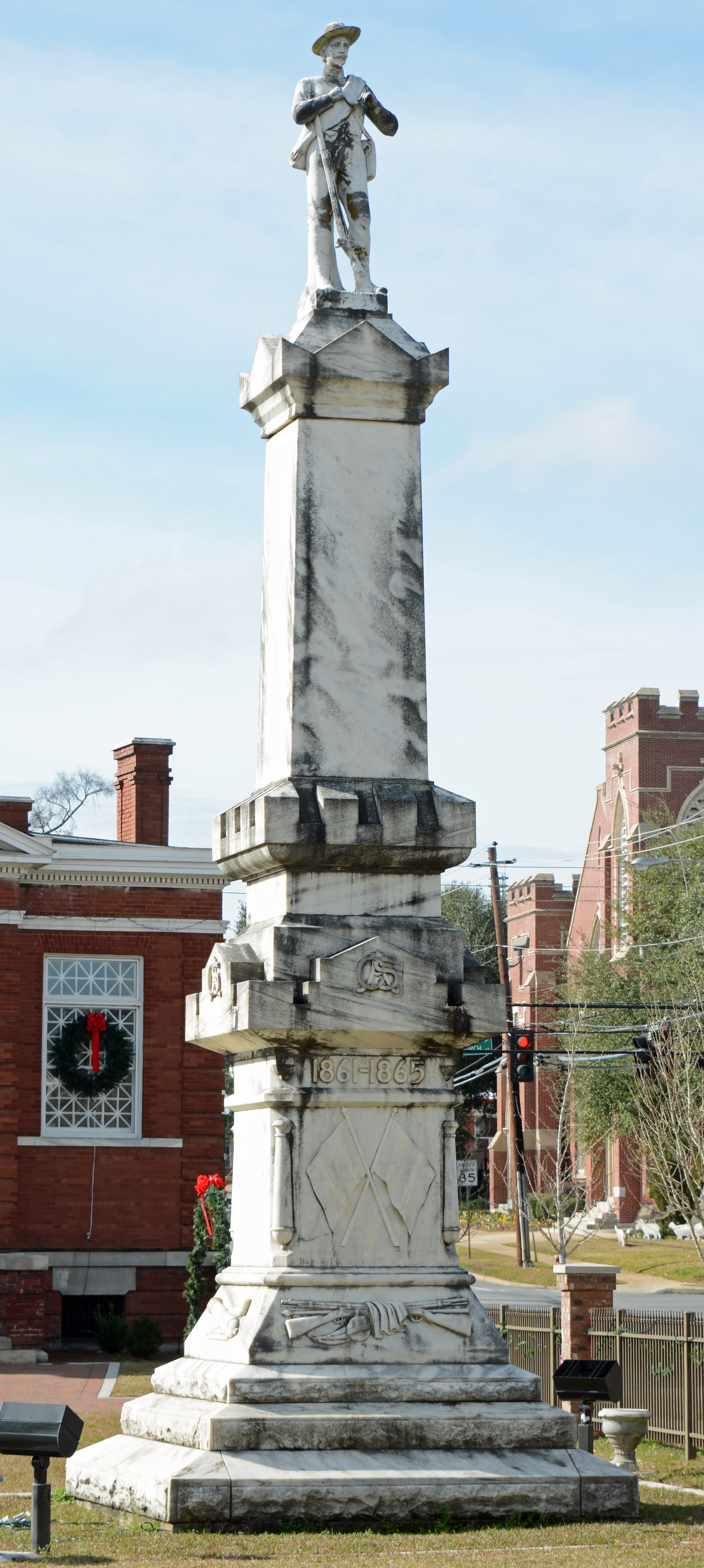
Dublin

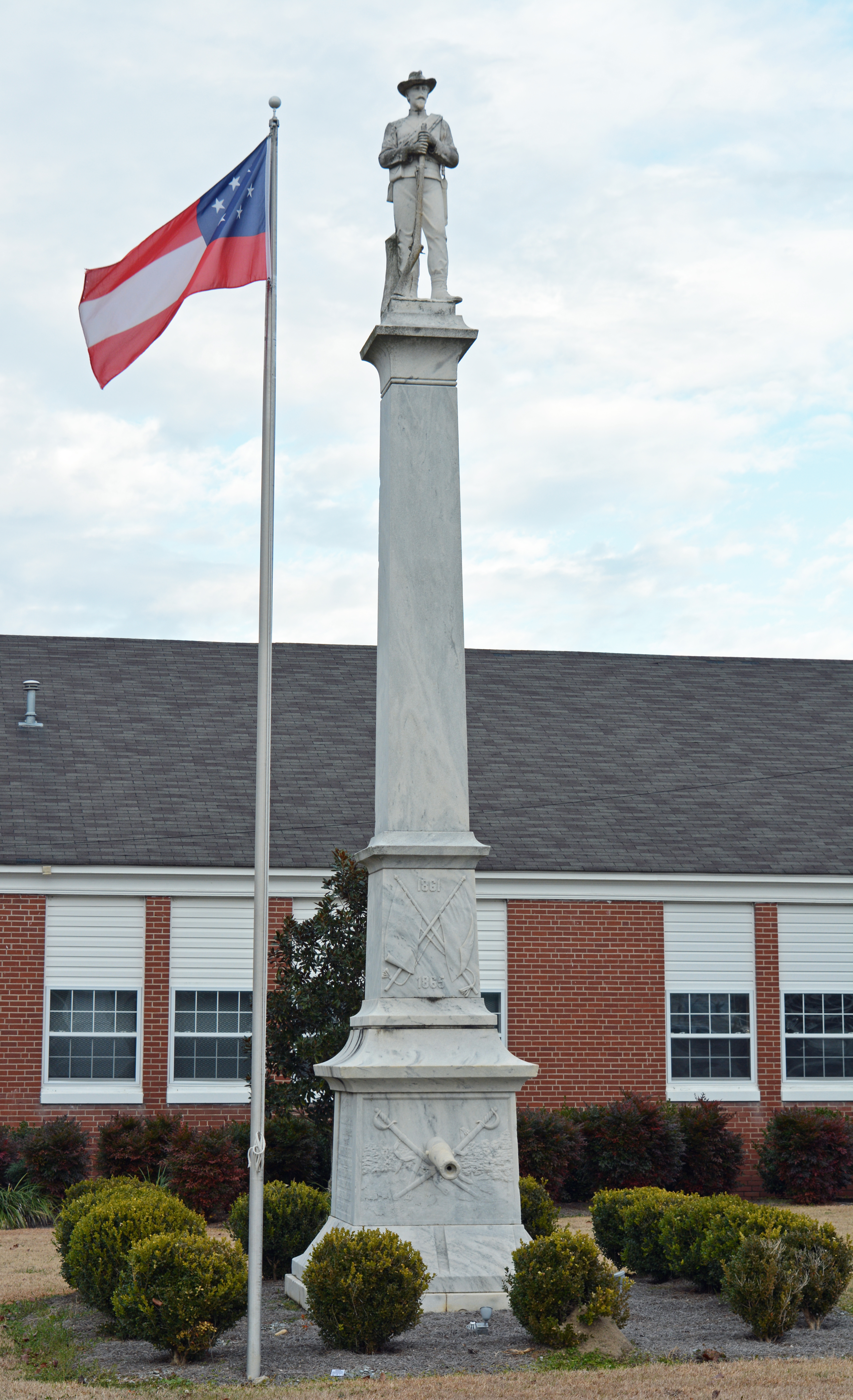
Eastman

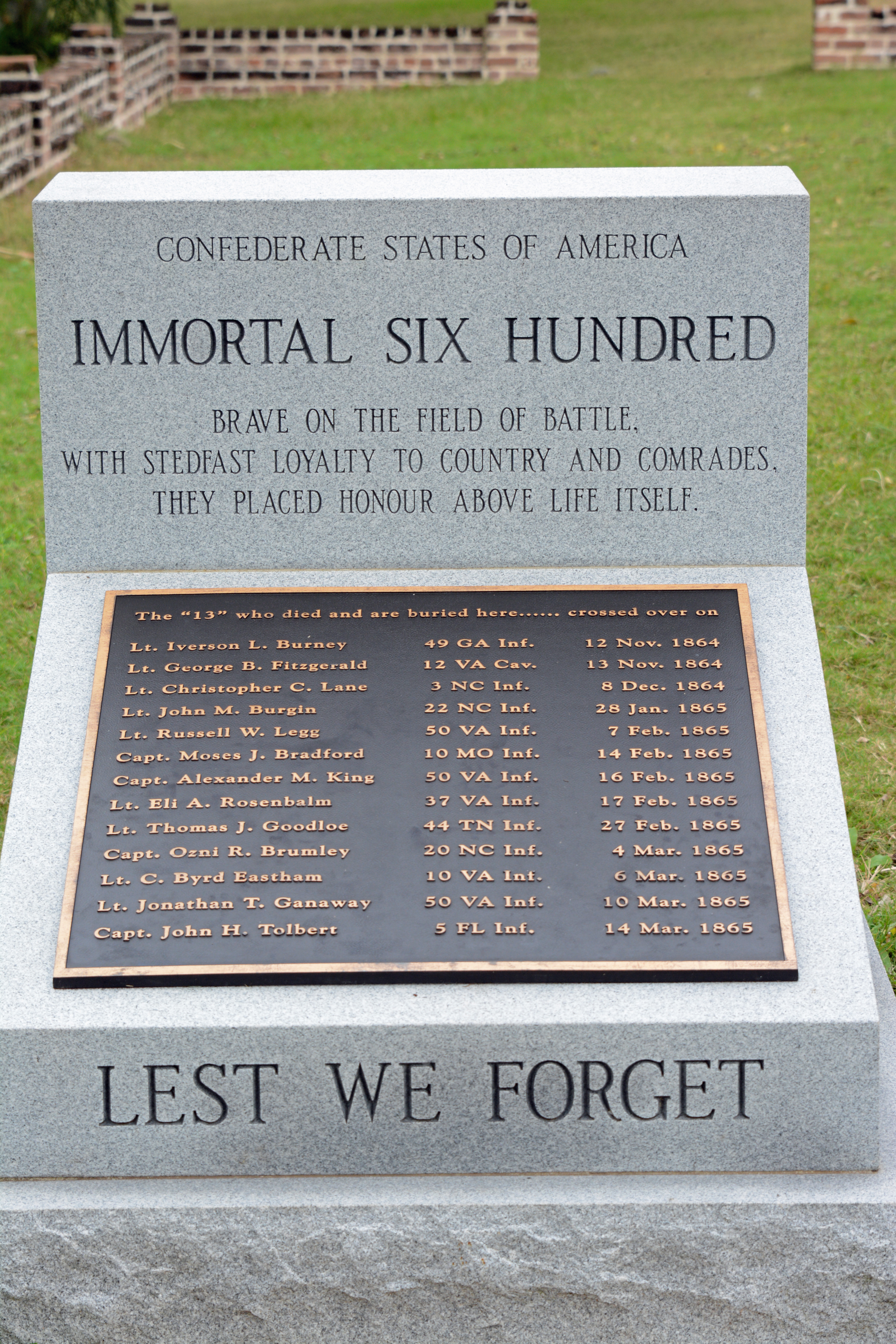
Fort Pulaski (Immortal Six Hundred)

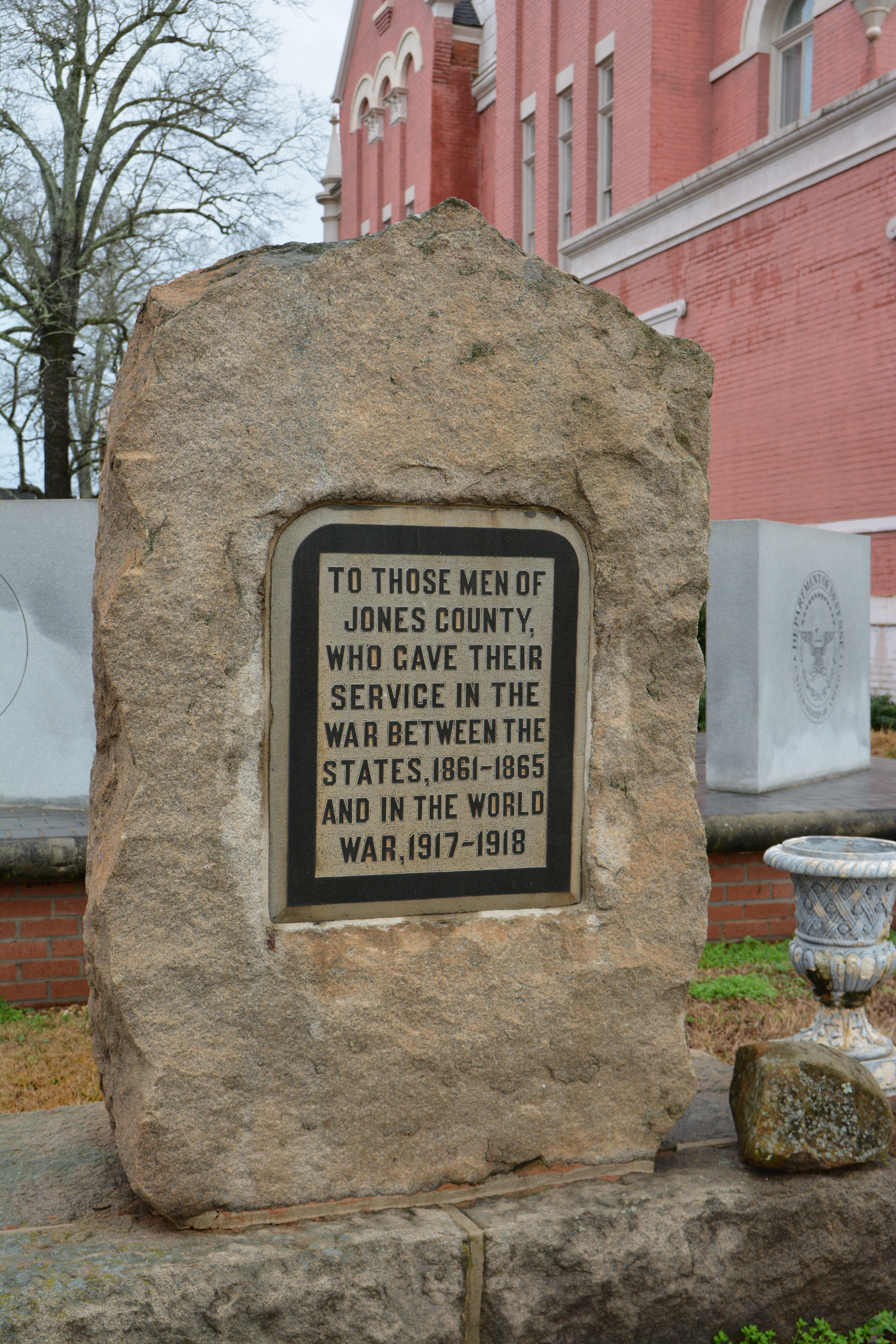
Gray

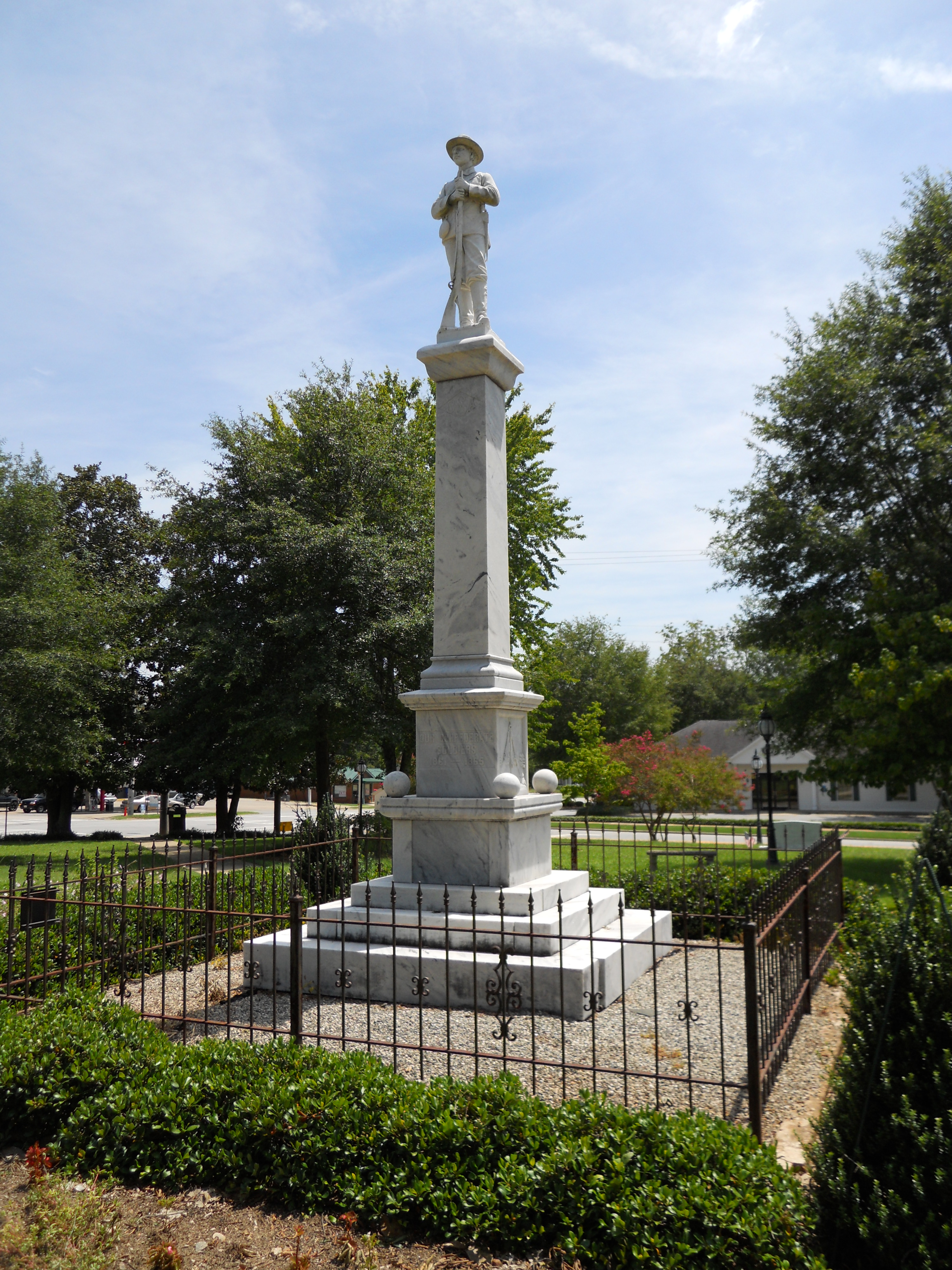
Hamilton

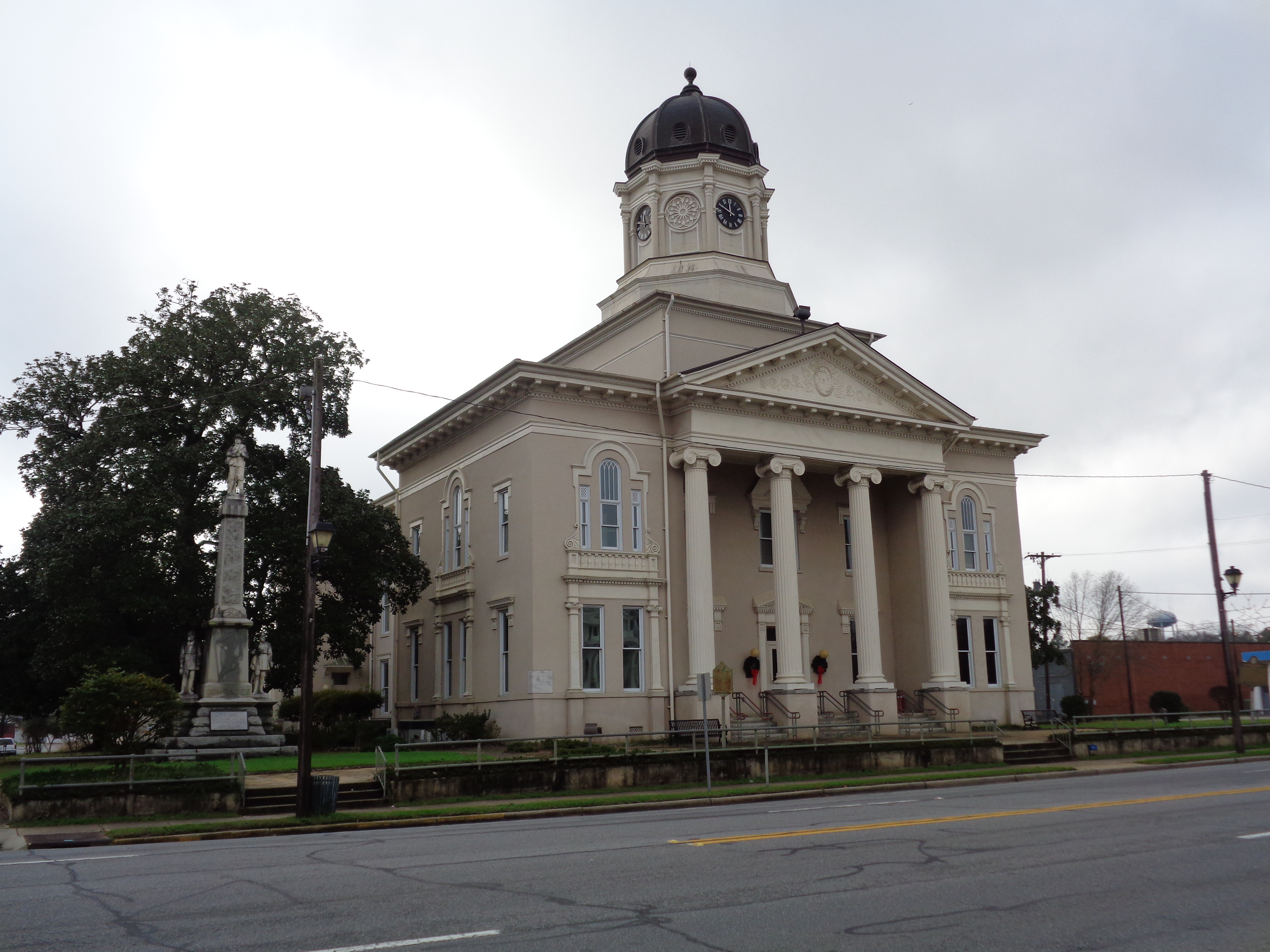
Hawkinsville

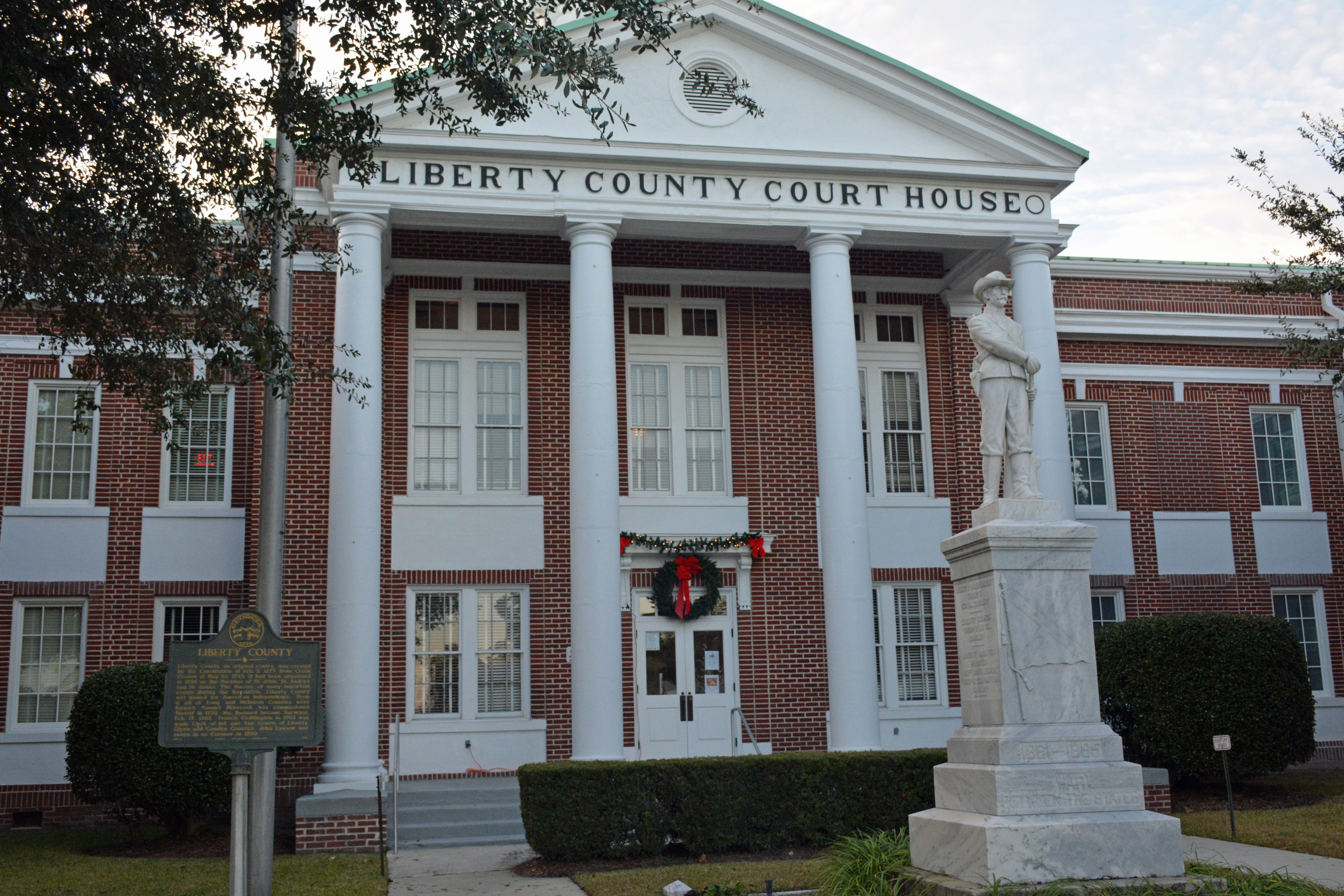
Hinesville

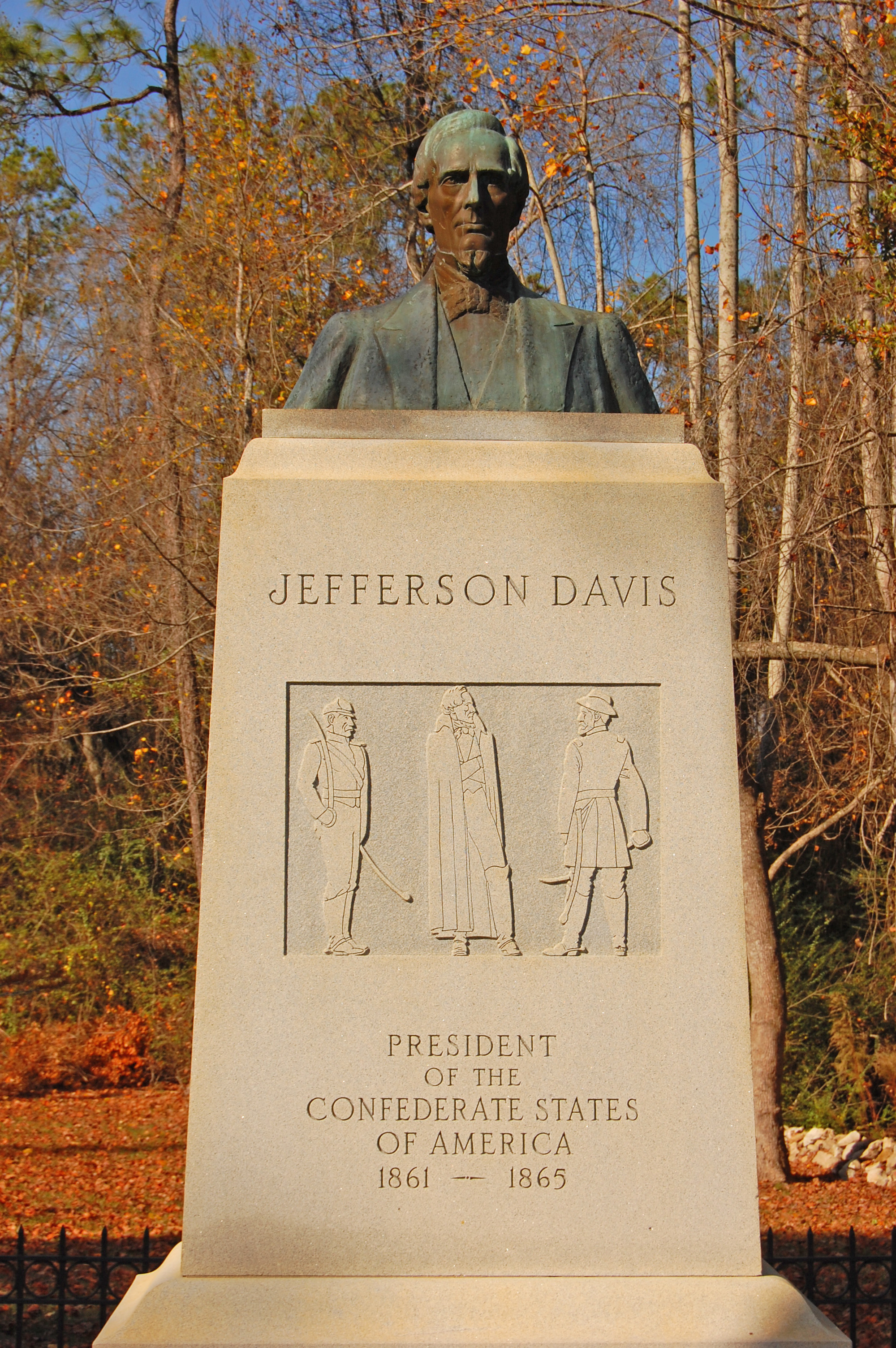
Irwin County

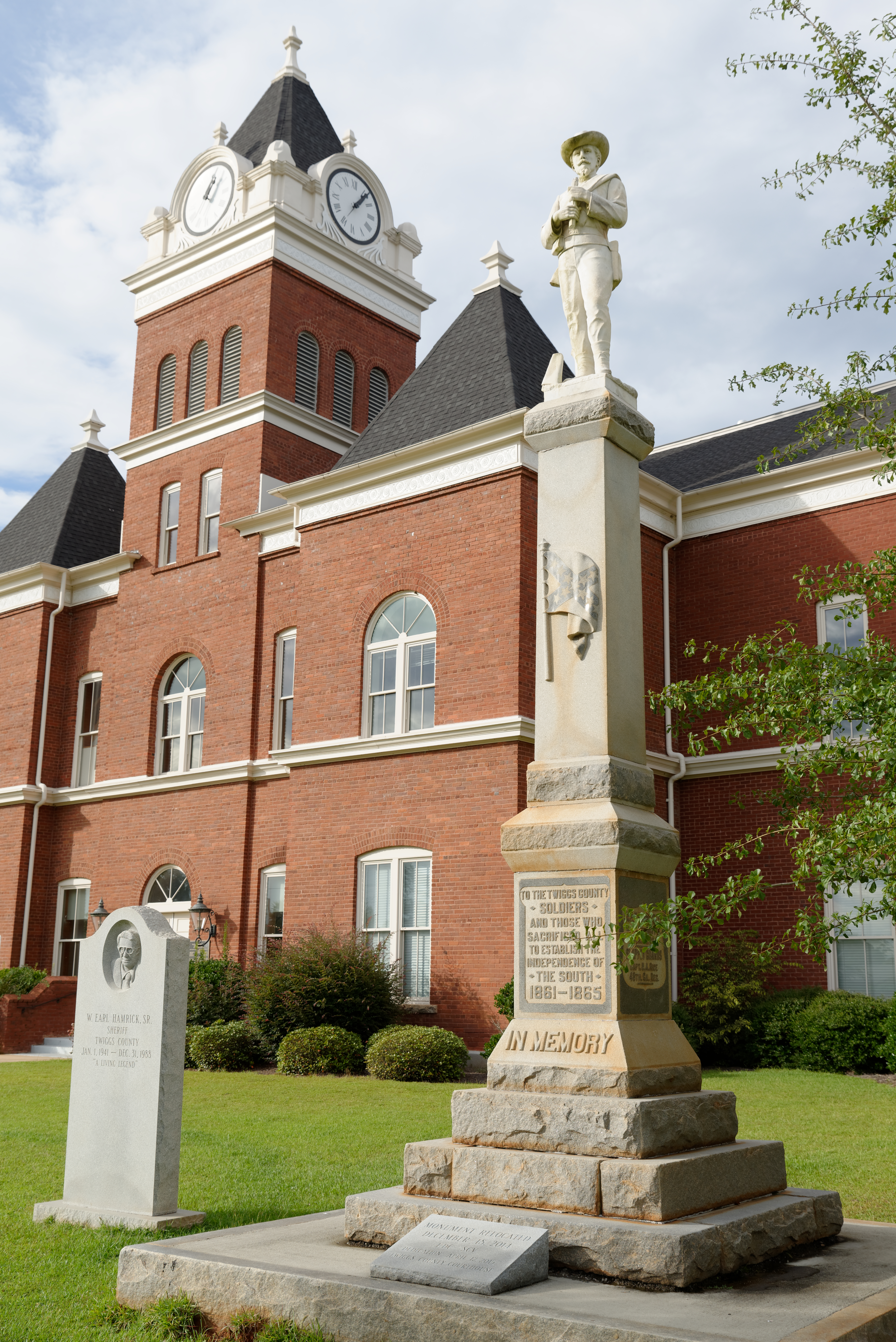
Jeffersonville

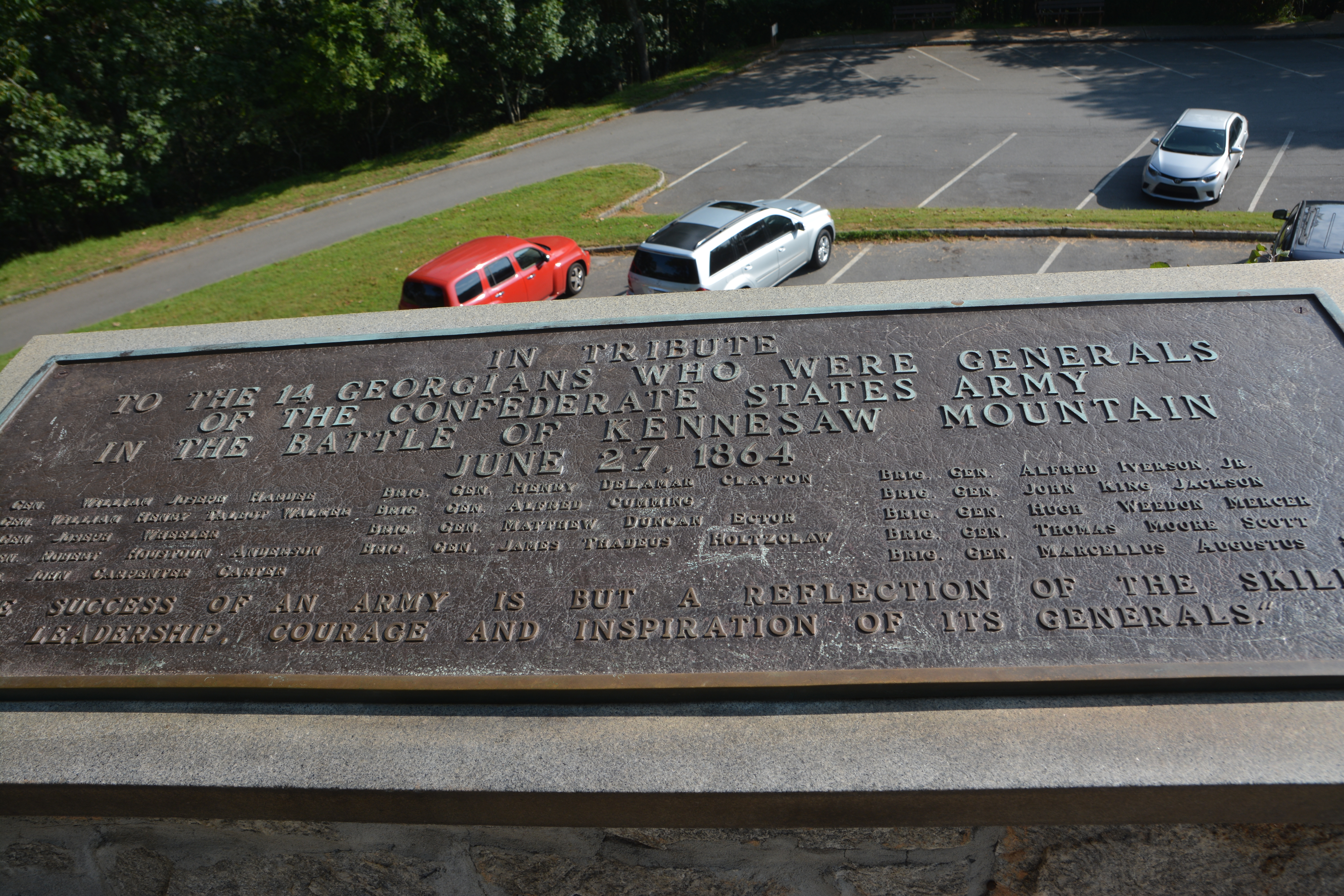
Kennesaw Mountain – 14 generals

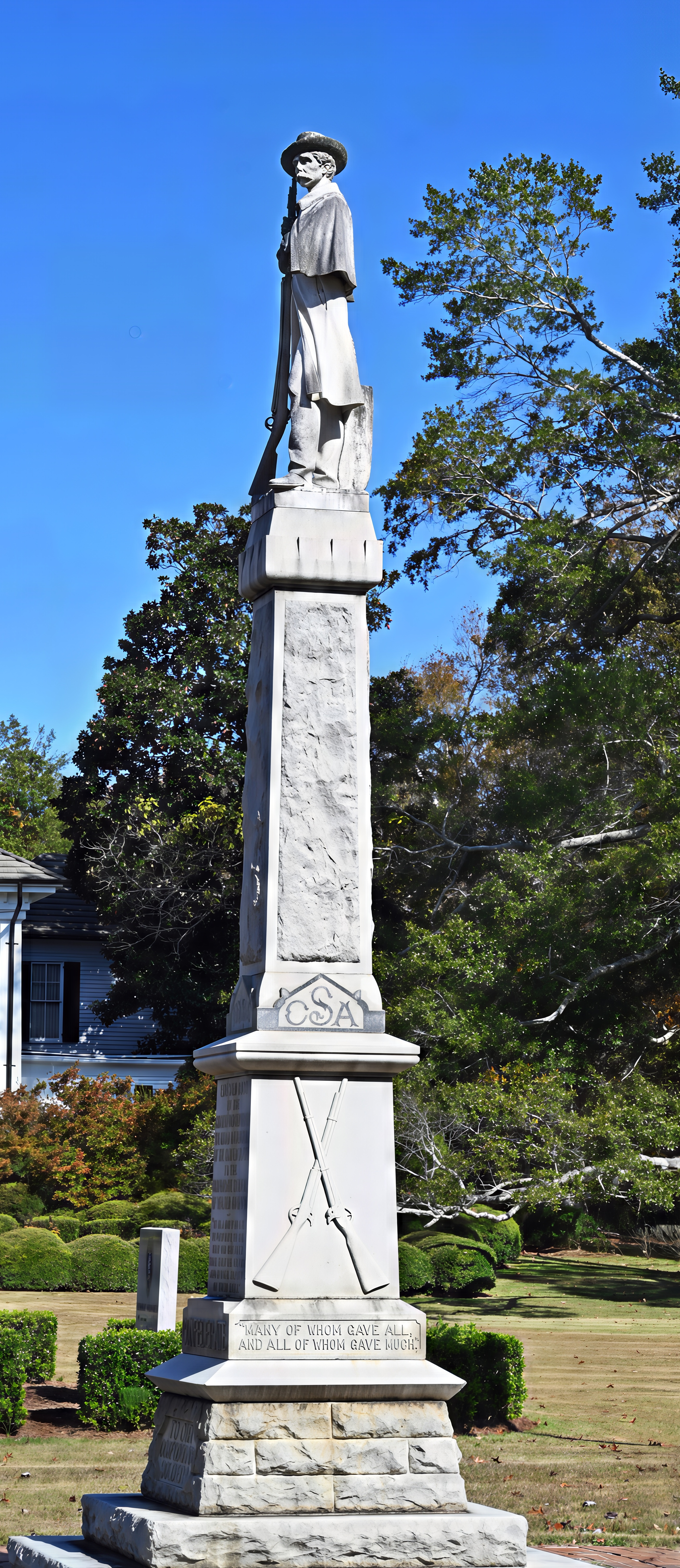
LaFayette

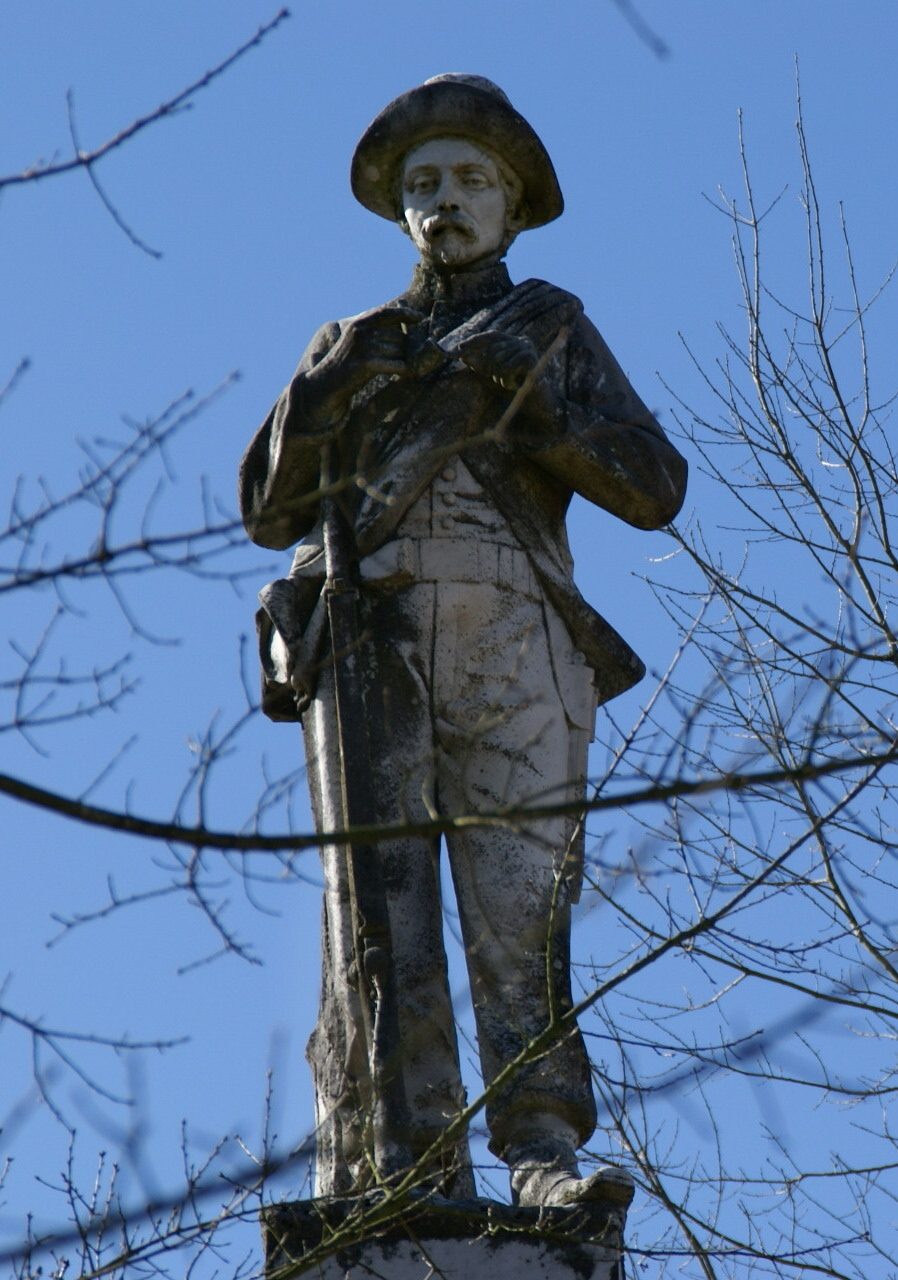
Lumpkin

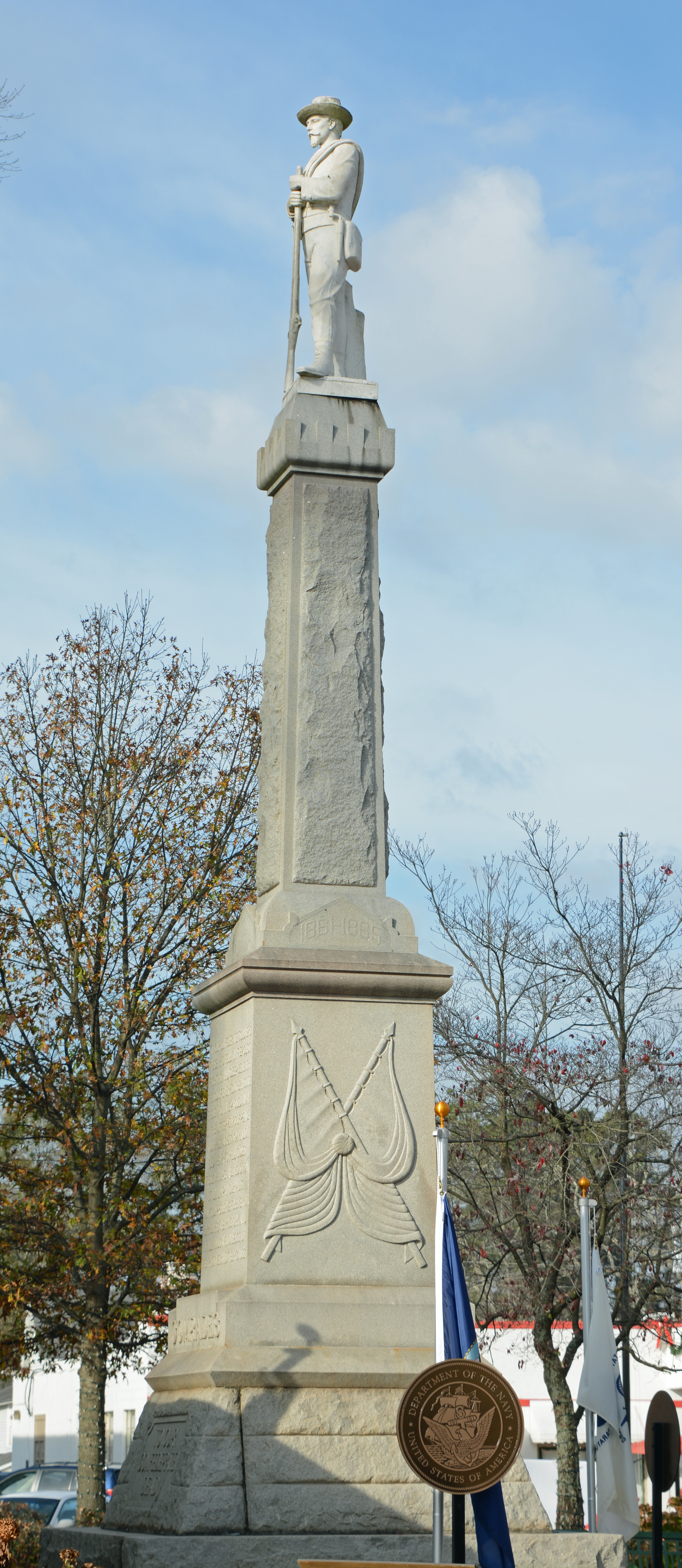
McDonough

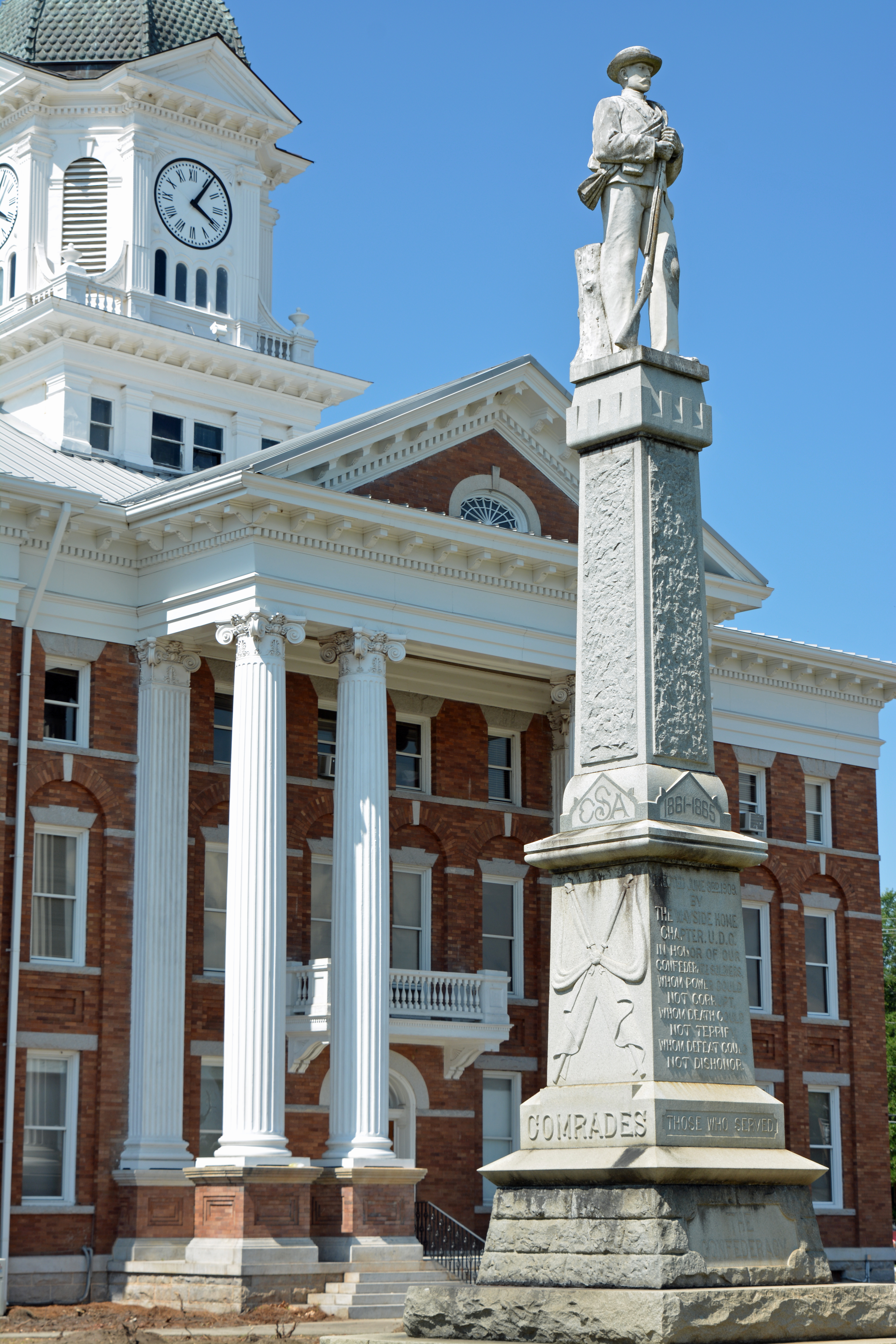
Millen

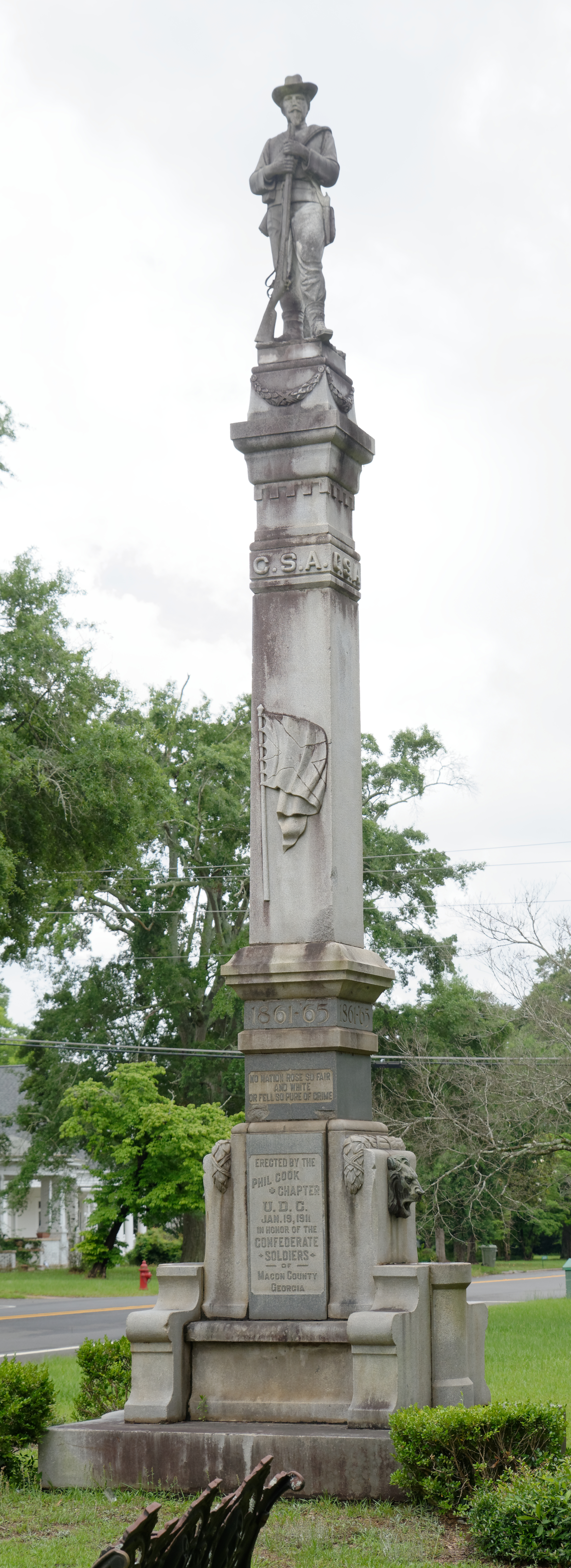
Montezuma

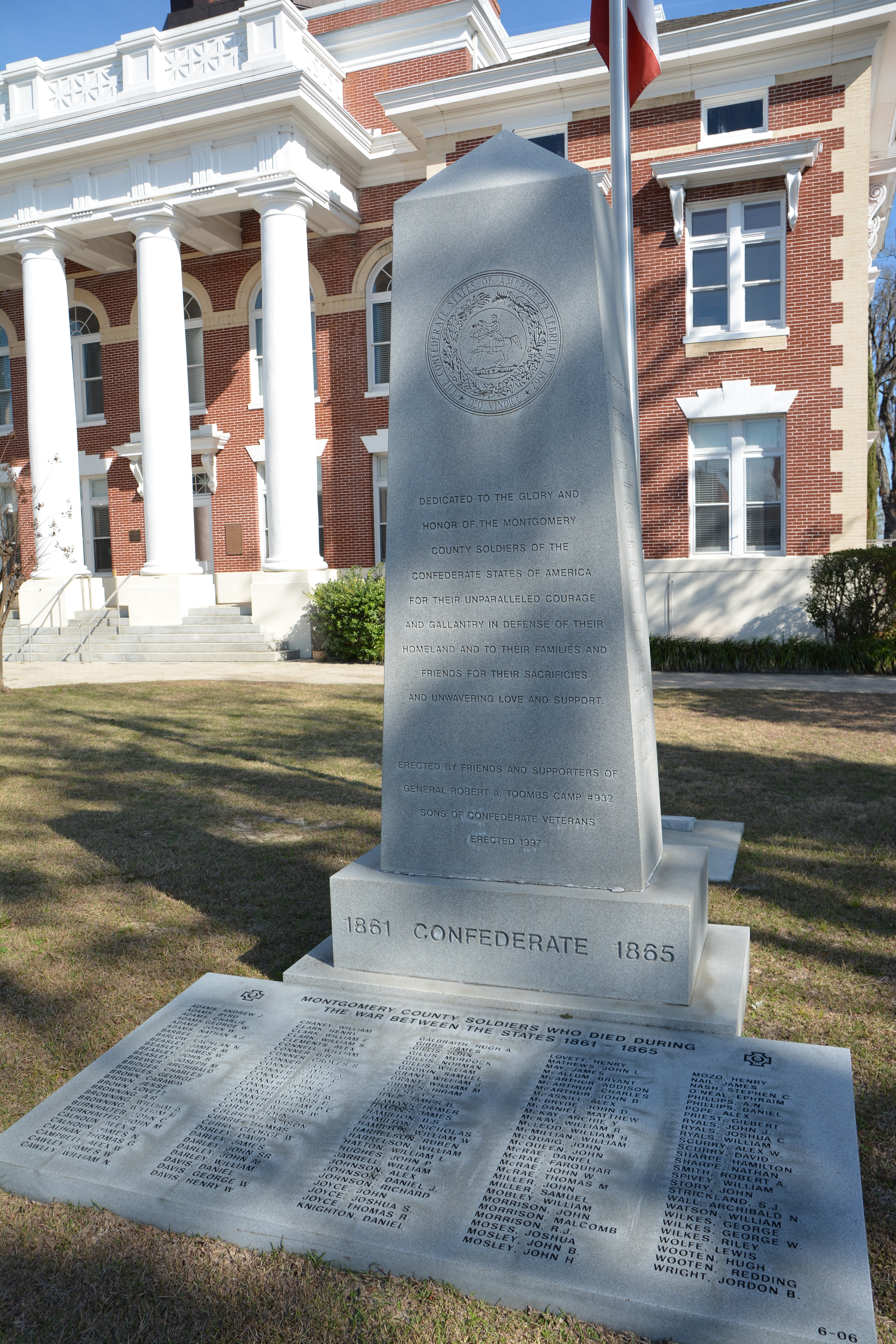
Mount Vernon

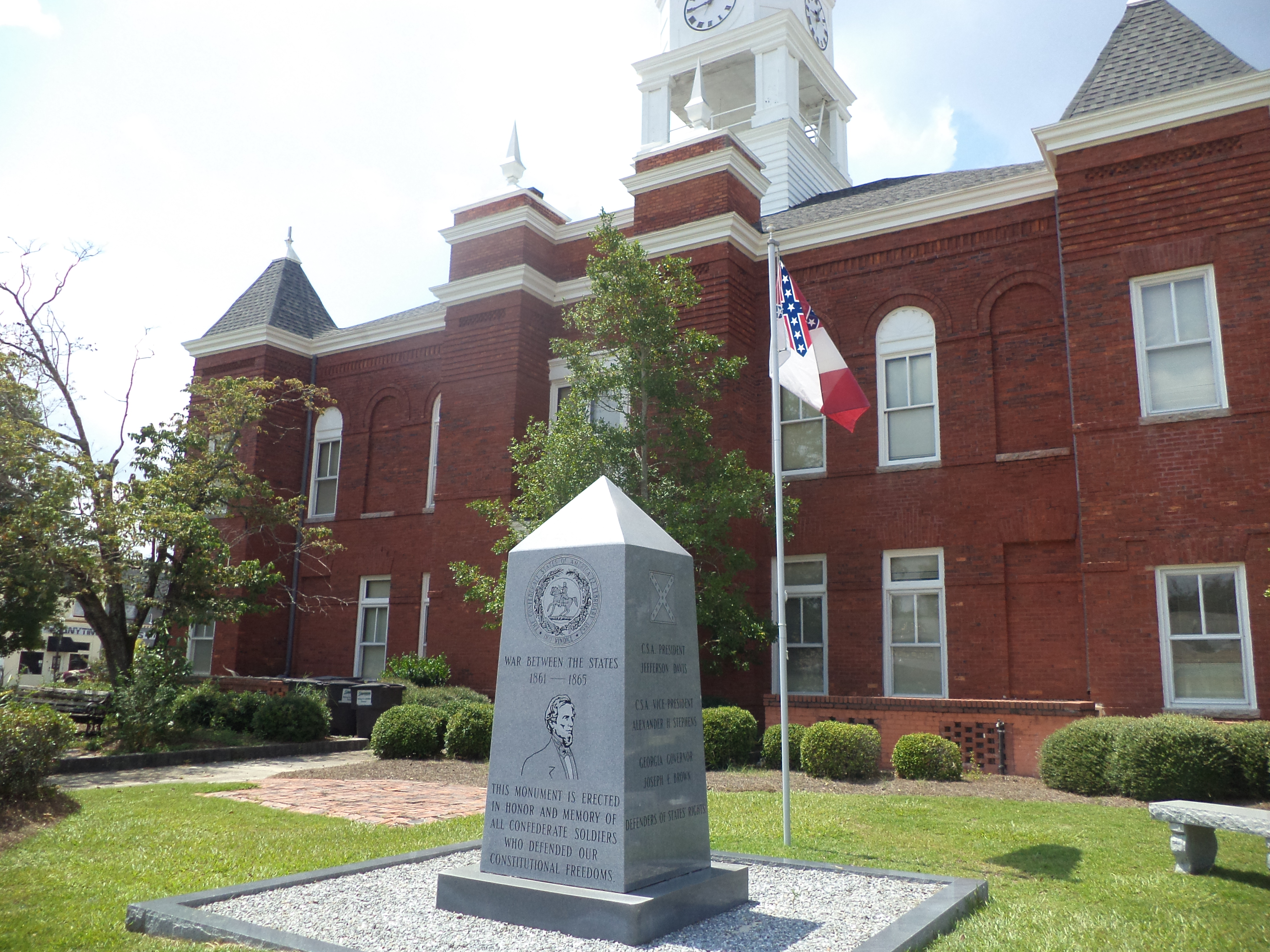
Nashville

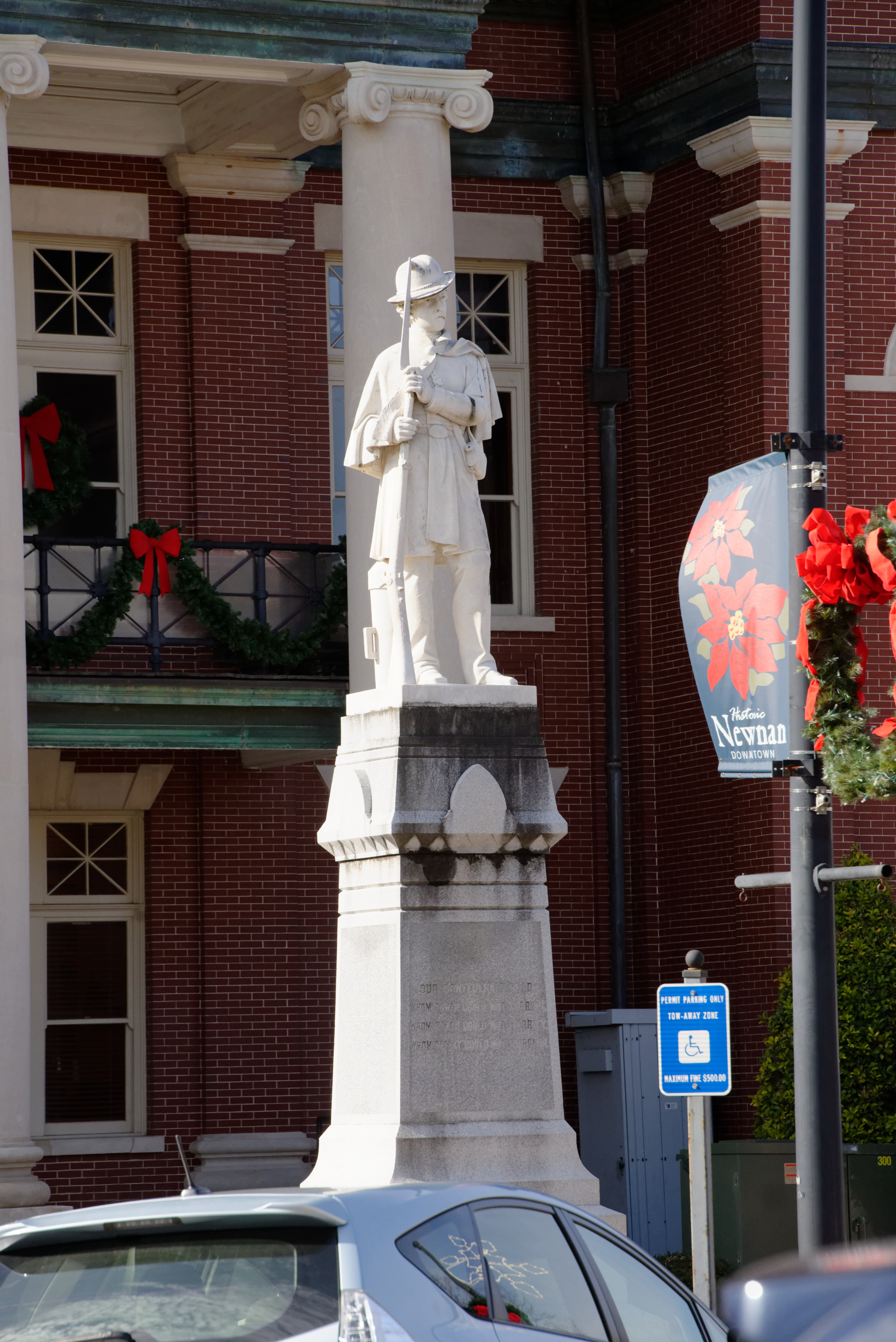
Newnan

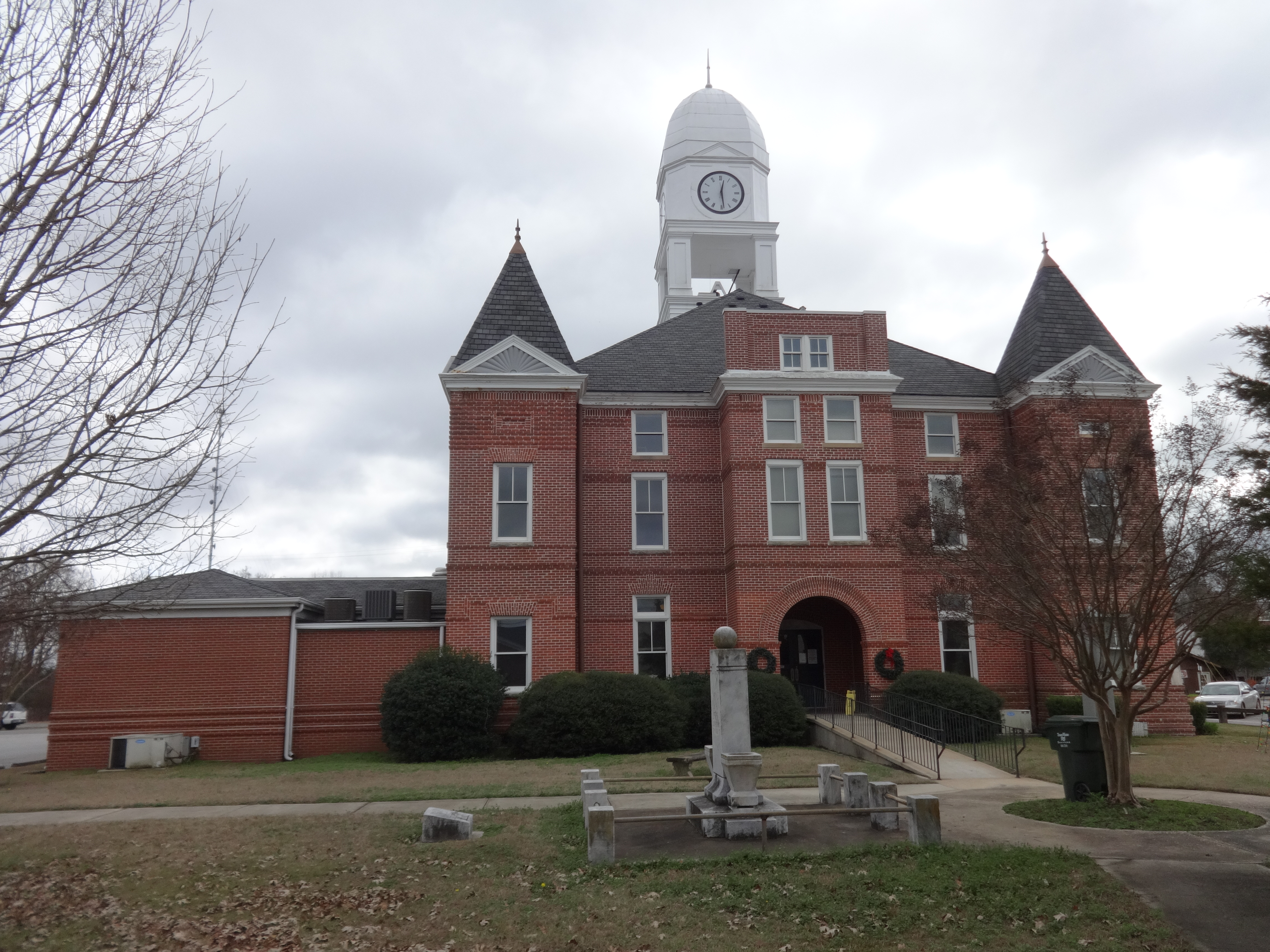
Oglethorpe

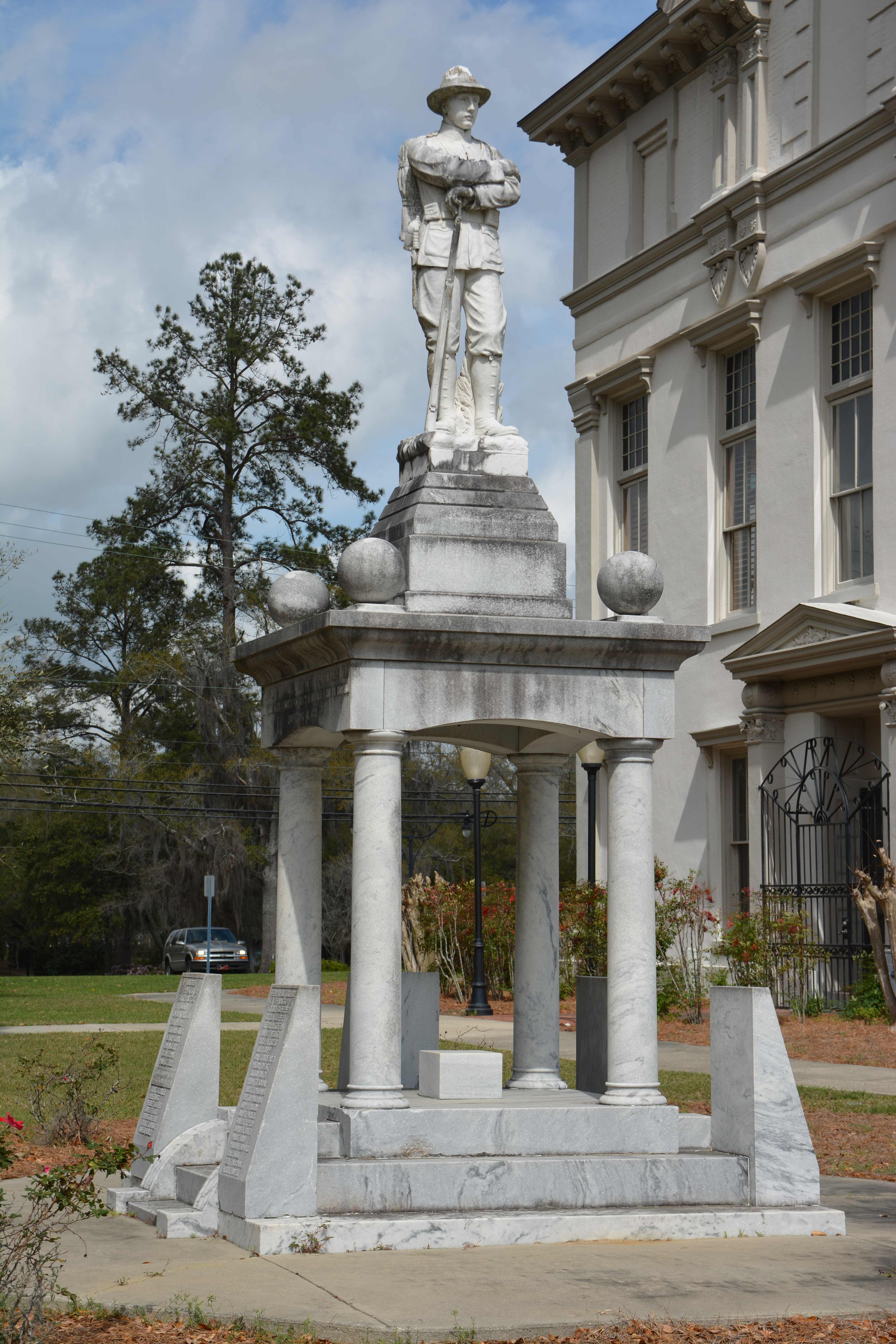
Quitman

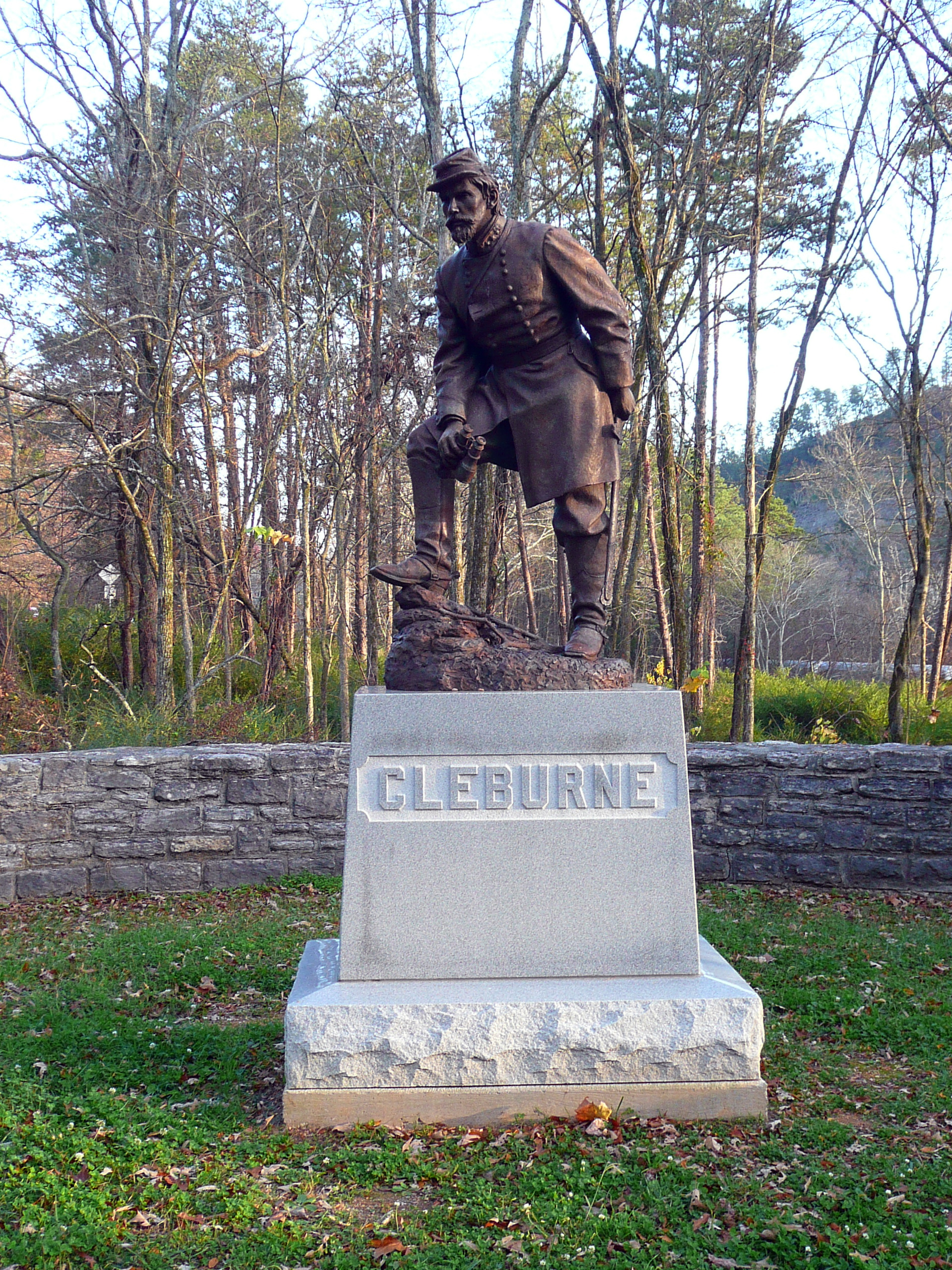
Patrick R. Cleburne statue, Ringgold

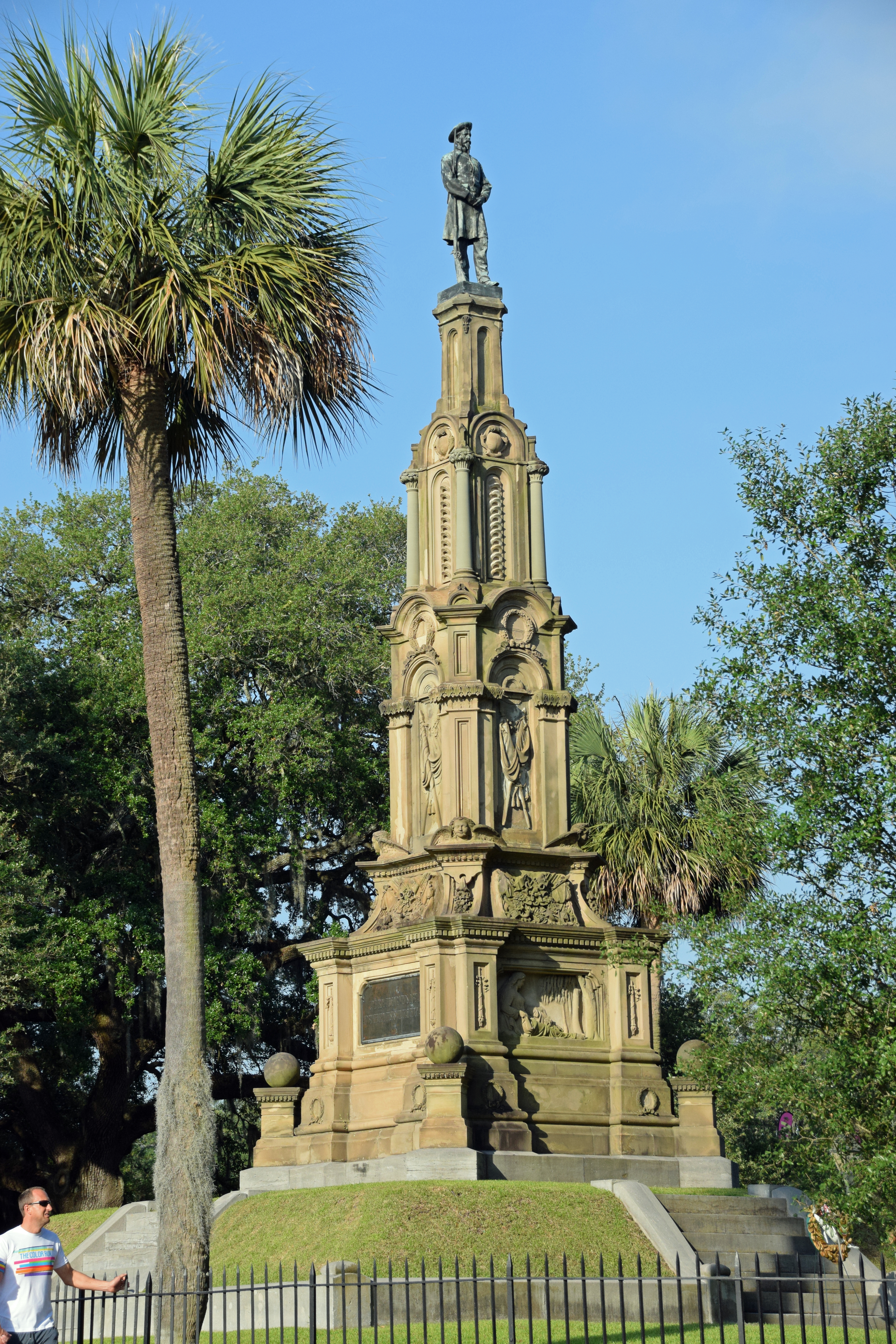
Savannah

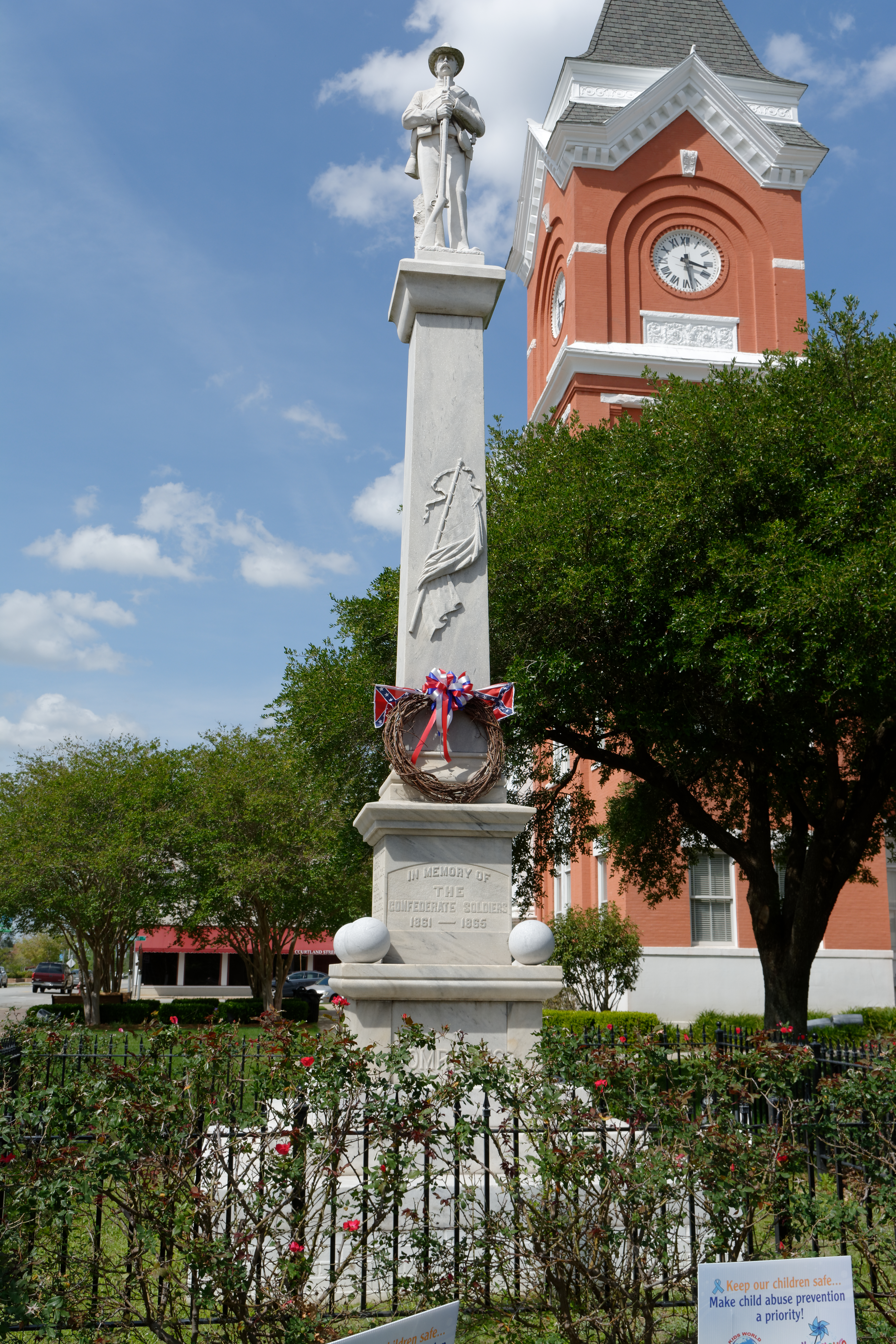
Statesboro

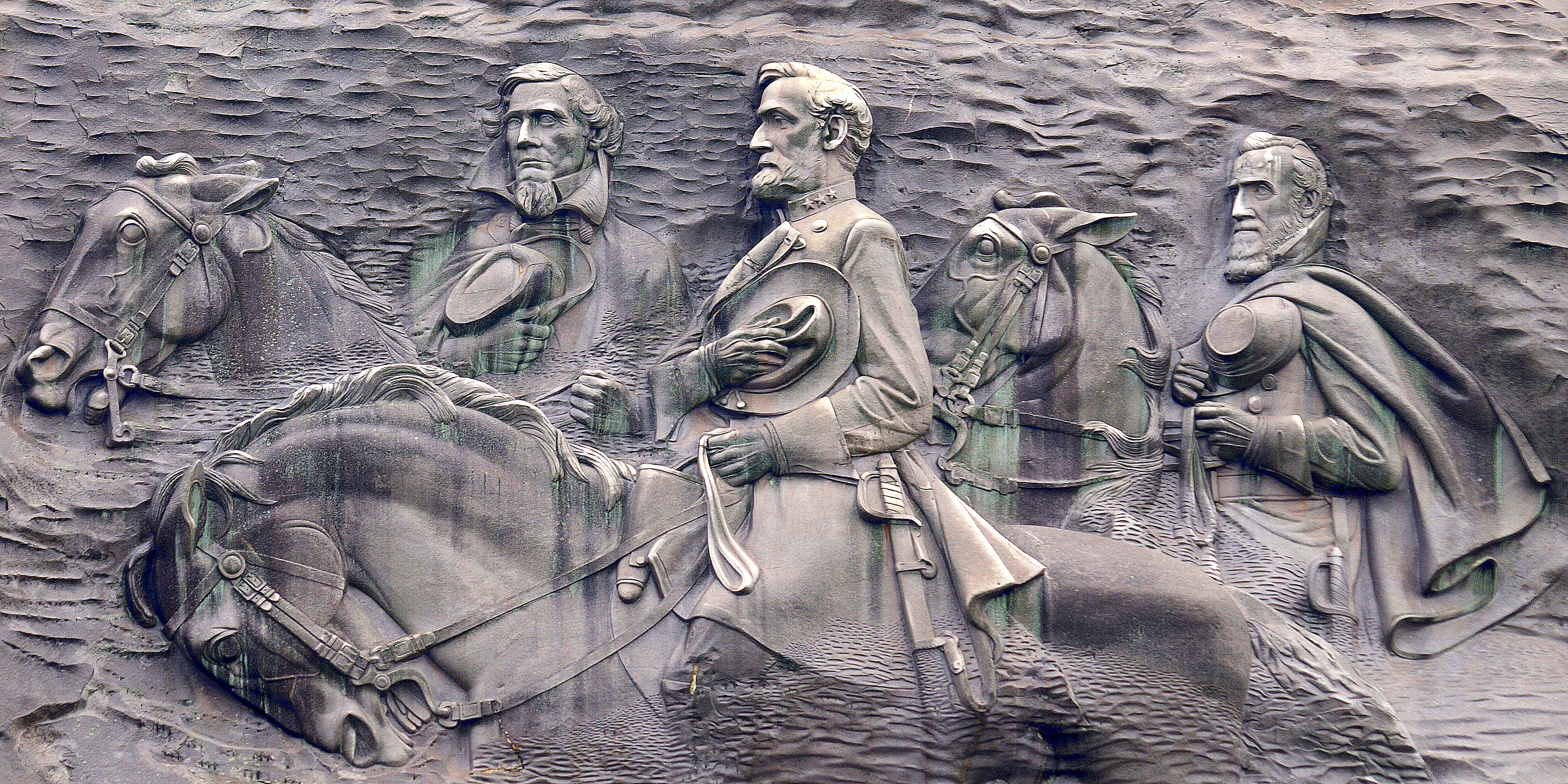
Stone Mountain

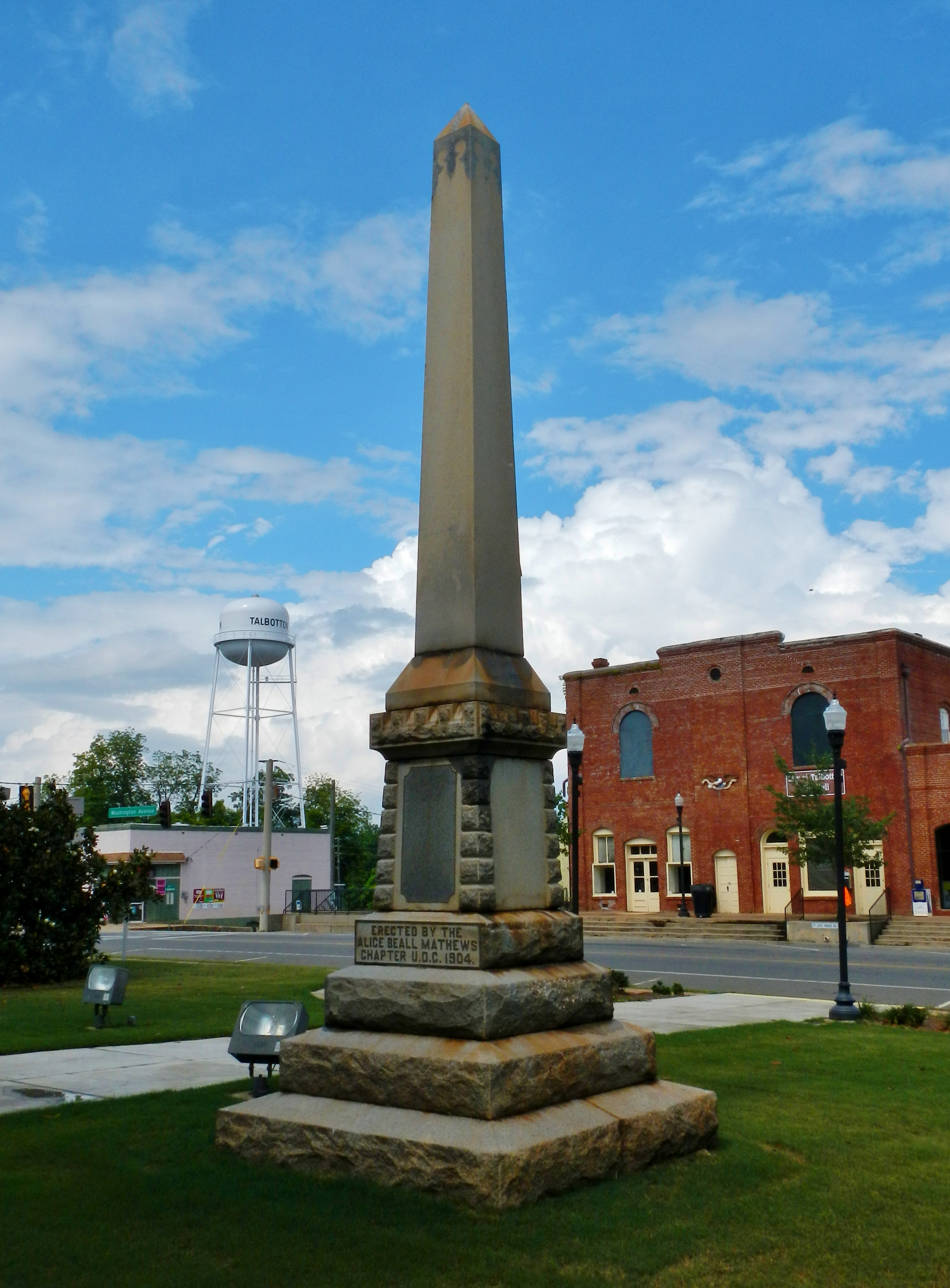
Talbotton

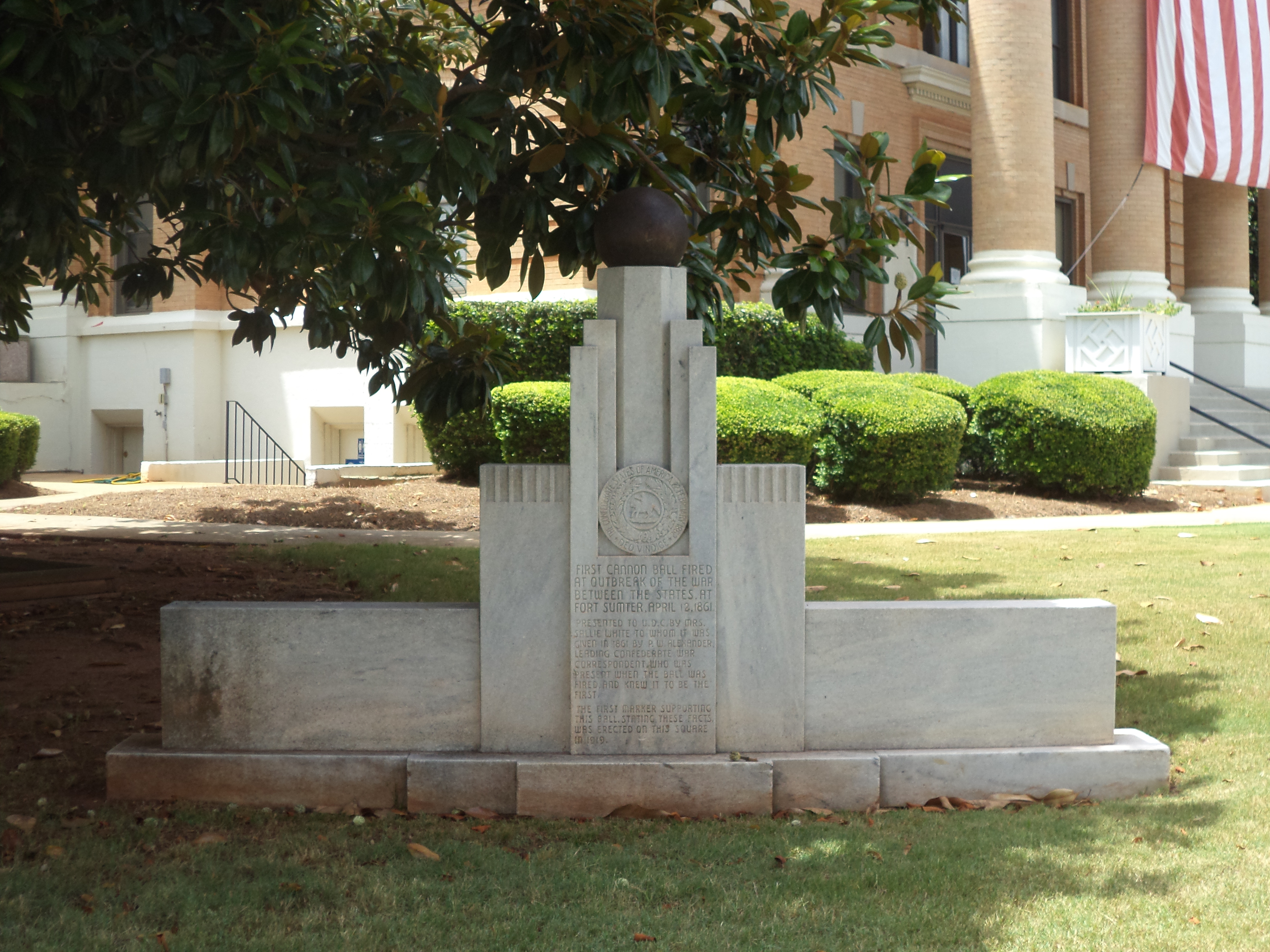
Thomaston

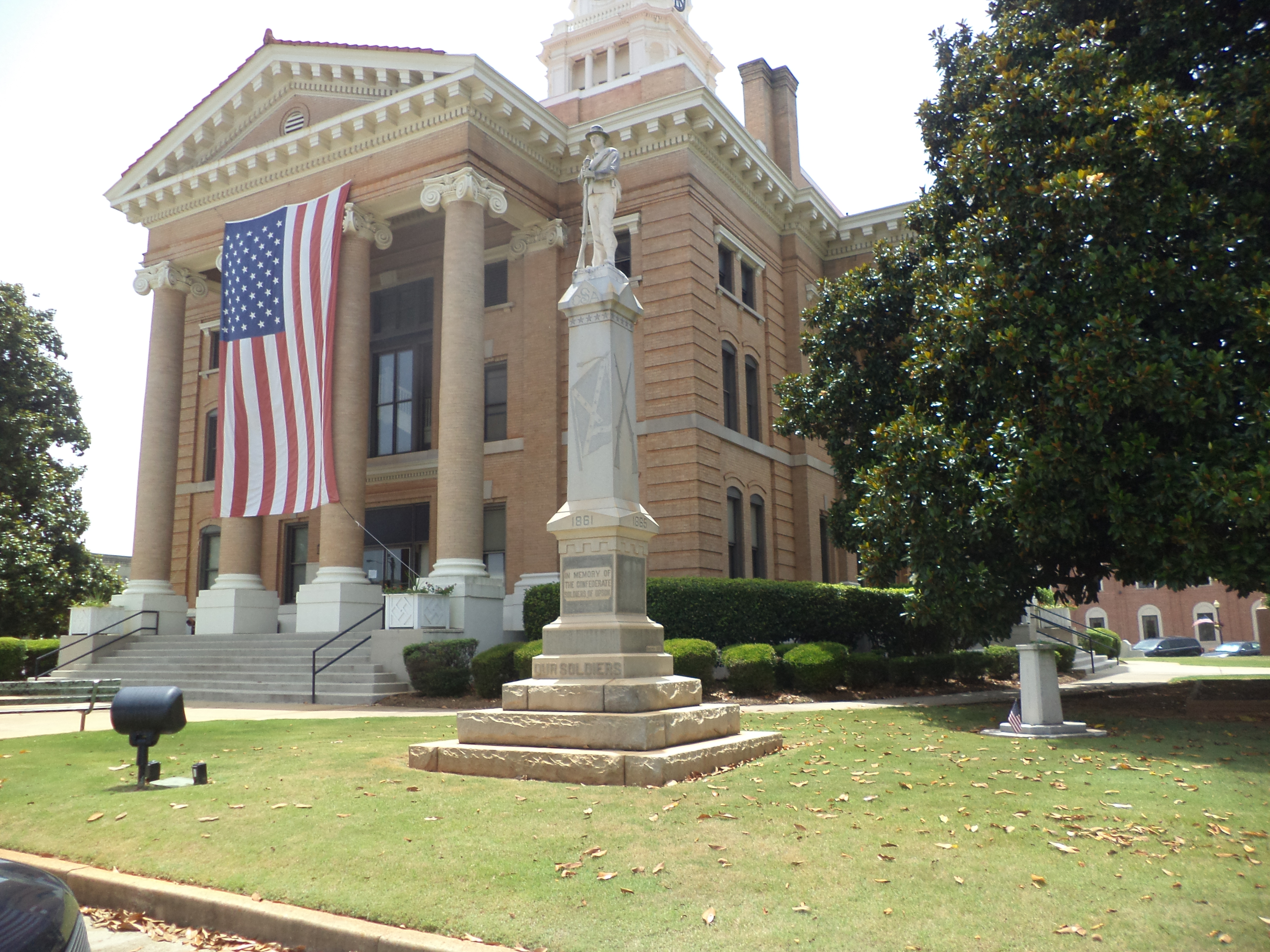
Thomaston

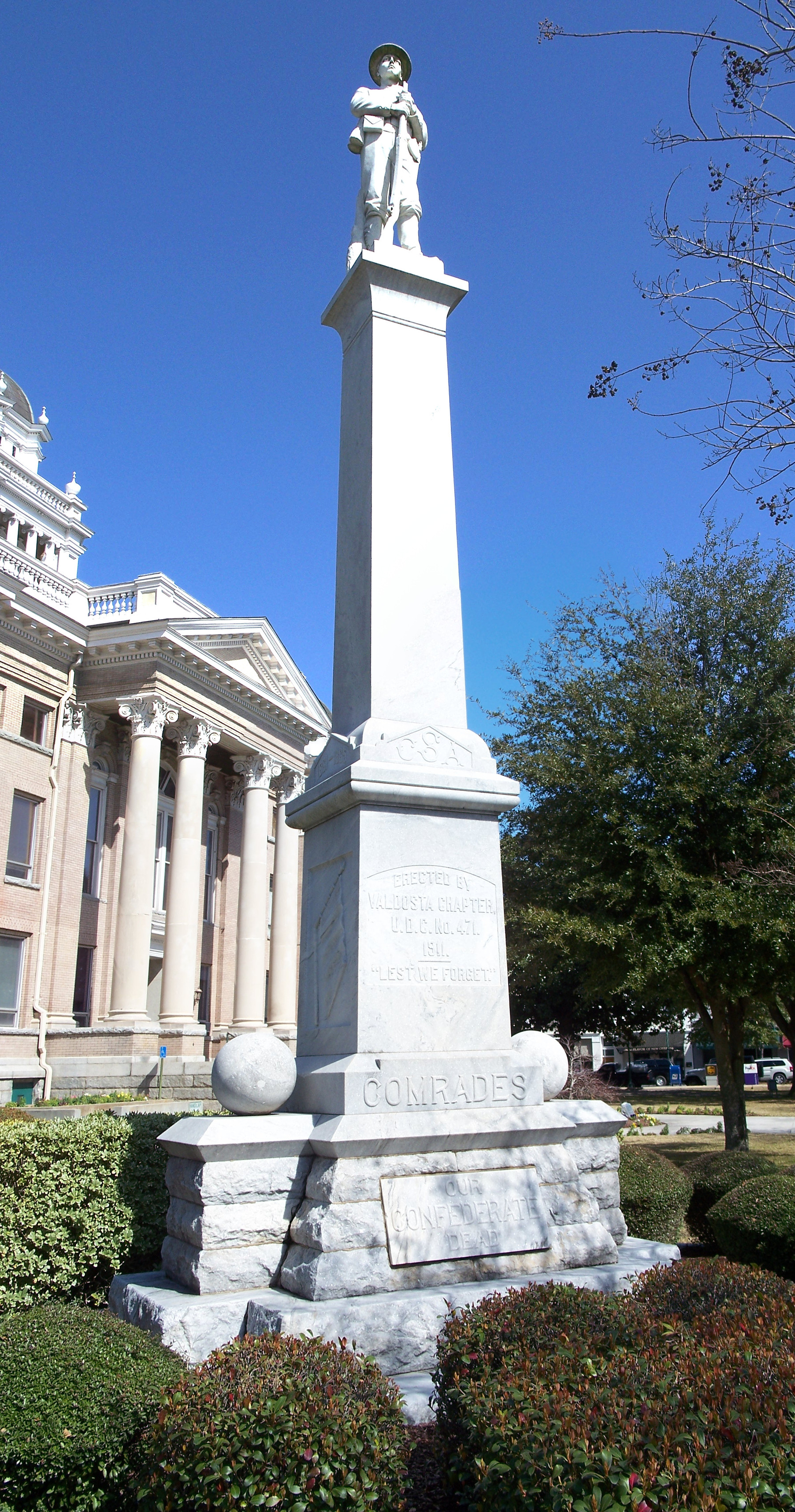
Valdosta

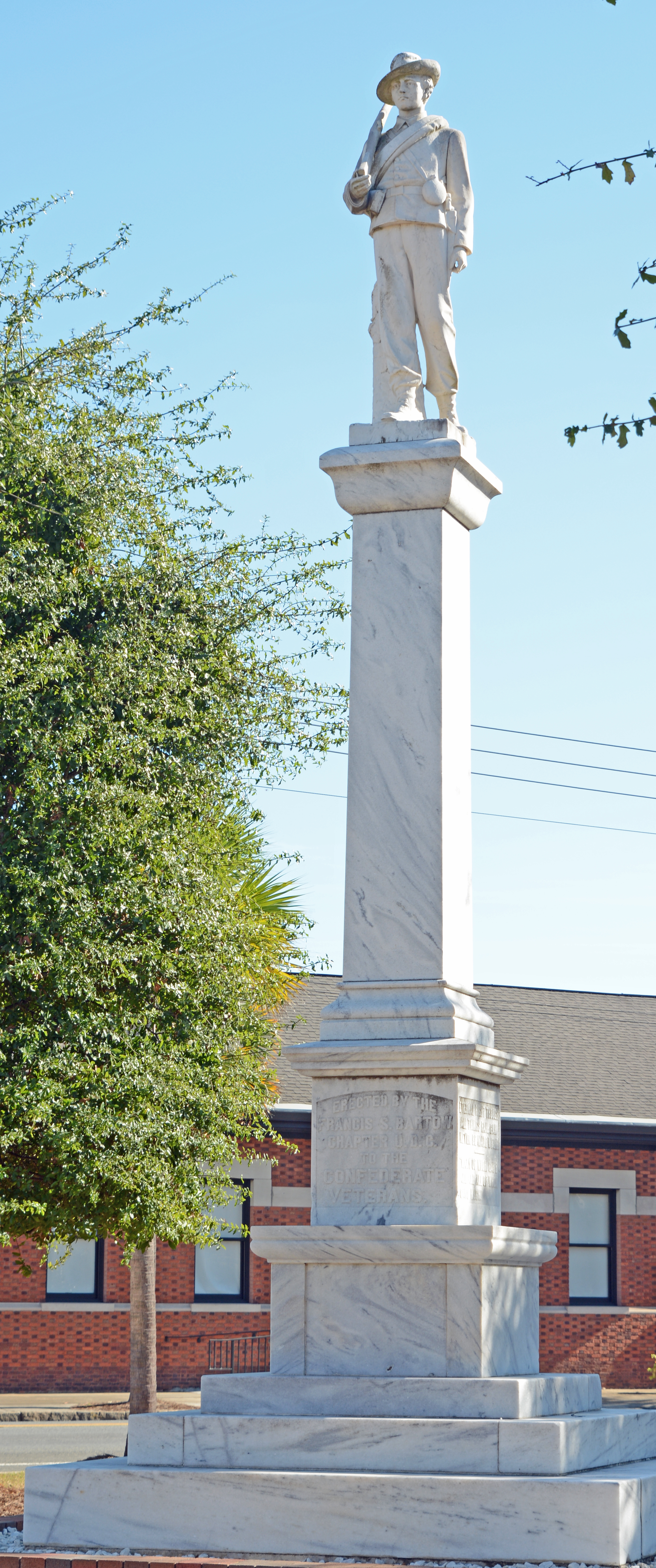
Waycross

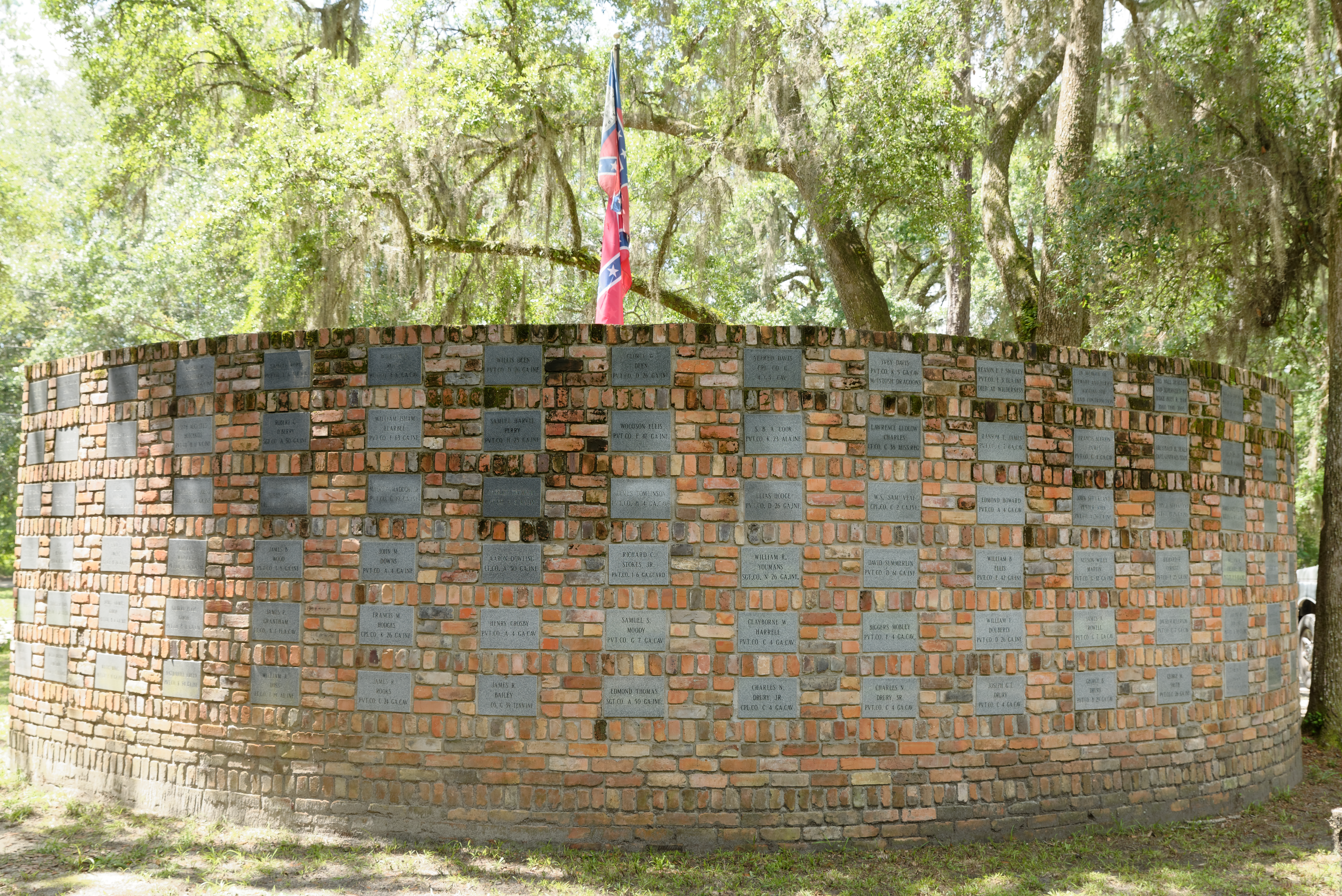
Waynesville

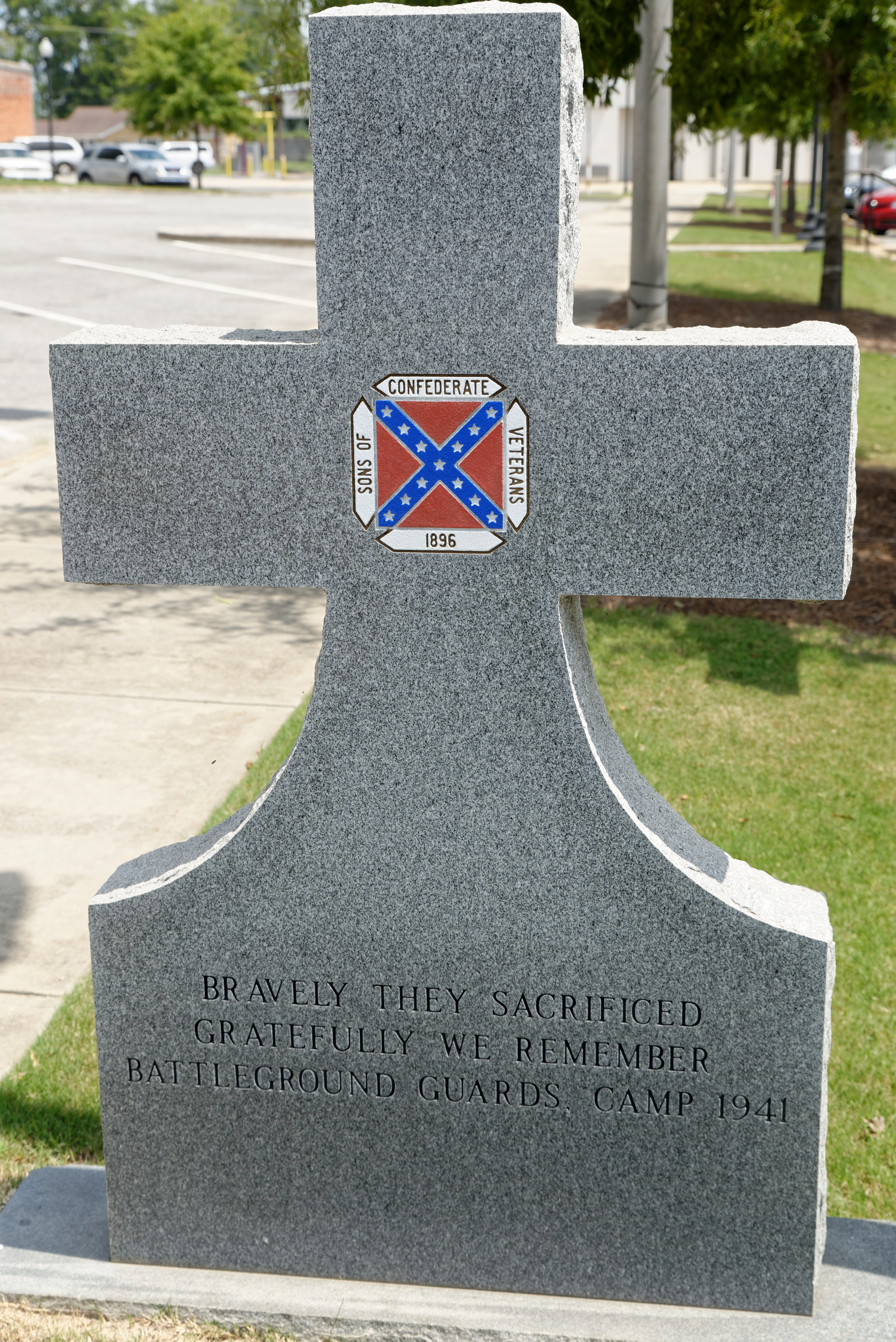
Wrightsville

== See also ==
- Removal of Confederate monuments and memorials#Georgia
