= 1945 in art =

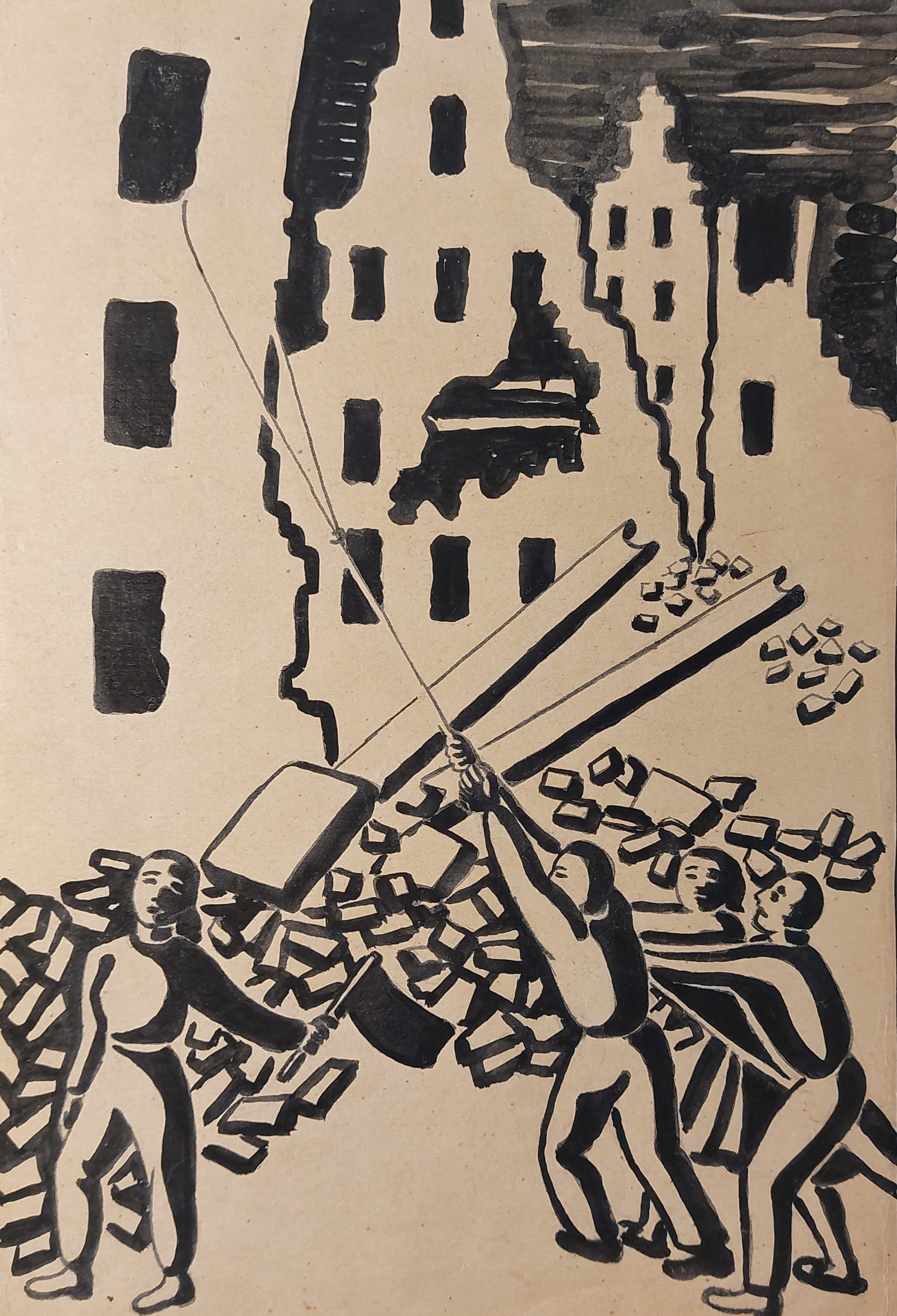
Inge Becker, Tuschzeichnung, 1945

Events from the year 1945 in art.

== Events ==
- April 12 – President of the United States Franklin D. Roosevelt collapses while having a portrait painted by Elizabeth Shoumatoff at Warm Springs, Georgia, dying shortly afterwards.
- April 15 – Bergen-Belsen concentration camp liberated. Among the British war artists (official and unofficial) who record it soon afterwards are Sgt. Eric Taylor, Leslie Cole, Doris Zinkeisen, Mervyn Peake, Mary Kessell and Carl Giles, together with Edgar Ainsworth and photographer Bert Hardy of Picture Post. William Congdon, serving as an ambulance driver, is one of the first Americans to enter the camp.
- April 28 – Professor Anthony Blunt is appointed to succeed Sir Kenneth Clark as Surveyor of the King's Pictures in the United Kingdom.
- April
  - German Reichsmarschall Hermann Göring's looted art cache is transferred from his country estate, Carinhall, to Berchtesgaden where it will be found by U.S. forces.
  - U.S. forces reach the Kaiserode mine at Merkers in Germany, finding 400 paintings from Berlin museums, other art treasures and gold.
- May
  - Allied forces reach the Nazi stolen art repository in the salt mines at Altaussee in Austria, finding more than 6,500 paintings, including Michelangelo’s Madonna of Bruges and Jan van Eyck’s Ghent Altarpiece.
  - Retreating SS forces destroy the Klimt University of Vienna Ceiling Paintings in store at Schloss Immendorf.
  - The Friedrichshain flak tower in Berlin is set on fire and most of the objects stored inside for safe keeping are destroyed, including Botticelli's Madonna and Child with Angels Carrying Candlesticks, Madonna and Child with Infant Saint John and an Annunciation.
  - Ben Nicholson paints still lifes incorporating British Union Flags to mark V-E Day.
- July–December – Han van Meegeren paints his last forgery of a Dutch Golden Age painting, Jesus among the Doctors, before witnesses in Amsterdam to refute charges of having sold genuine Dutch cultural property to Nazis (for which he was arrested on May 29).
- October 25 – Jackson Pollock marries Lee Krasner.
- Constantine Andreou moves to France, having received a scholarship from the French government.
- New York businessman Henry Pearlman acquires Chaïm Soutine's View of Céret, the foundation of his collection of modern art.

== Awards ==
- Archibald Prize: William Dargie – Lt-General The Hon Edmund Herring, KBC, DSO, MC, ED

== Exhibitions ==
- January – Mark Rothko exhibition in the Daylight Gallery of Peggy Guggenheim's The Art of This Century gallery in Manhattan.
- March 19 – Jackson Pollock's second solo exhibition opens in the Daylight Gallery of Peggy Guggenheim's The Art of This Century gallery in Manhattan.

== Works ==
- David Alfaro Siqueiros – El Coronelazo
- C. C. Beall – Now... All Together (War Loan poster)
- Hyman Bloom – Christmas Tree
- Leonora Carrington - The Temptation of St. Anthony
- Marc Chagall – Apocalypse in Lilac, Capriccio
- Colin Colahan – Ballet of Wind and Rain
- Leslie Cole
  - Belsen Camp – The Compound for Women
  - Death pits at Bergen-Belsen
- Salvador Dalí
  - The Apotheosis of Homer
  - Basket of Bread
  - Portrait of a Passionate Woman (The Hands)
- Fernando Álvarez de Sotomayor y Zaragoza – Portrait of General Franco
- Russell Drysdale – The Drover's Wife
- Alfred Eisenstaedt – V-J Day in Times Square (photograph)
- Max Ernst – The Temptation of Saint Anthony
- Nora Heysen – Transport driver (Aircraftswoman Florence Miles)
- Yevgeny Khaldei – Raising a Flag over the Reichstag (photograph)
- Georg Mayer-Marton – Women with Boulders
- Pablo Picasso – The Charnel House
- Jackson Pollock – Troubled Queen (Museum of Fine Arts, Boston)
- Joe Rosenthal – Raising the Flag on Iwo Jima (photograph)
- Ben Shahn
  - Death on the Beach
  - Liberation
- Elizabeth Shoumatoff – Unfinished portrait of Franklin D. Roosevelt
- Janet Sobel – Illusion of Solidity
- Philip Zec – Here you are. Don't lose it again! (political cartoon)
- Doris Zinkeisen – Human Laundry, Belsen

== Births ==
- January 20 – Susan Rothenberg, American painter
- January 25 – Barbara Kruger, American photographer, graphic artist and sculptor
- January 31 – Joseph Kosuth, American conceptual artist
- March 4 – Rose Finn-Kelcey, English performance and installation artist (d. 2014)
- March 8 – Anselm Kiefer, German sculptor
- June 2 – Richard Long, English land artist
- June 14 – Jörg Immendorff, German painter, sculptor, stage designer and art professor (d. 2007)
- June 30 – Sean Scully, Irish-born painter working in the US
- July 16 – Victor Sloan, Irish visual artist
- July 28 – Jim Davis, American cartoonist and comics artist (Garfield)
- August 4 – Paul McCarthy, American sculptor and installation and video artist
- August 6 – Duggie Fields, English painter (d. 2012)
- August 9 – Posy Simmonds, English cartoonist
- August 18 – Brummbaer, German digital artist
- August 19 – Peter Reginato, American sculptor
- September 27 – Jack Goldstein, Canadian-born American performance and conceptual artist turned painter (d. 2003)
- October 13 – Heinz Plank, German painter, draughtsman and graphic artist
- October 23 – Maggi Hambling, English painter and sculptor
- November 14 – David Nash, English sculptor and academic
- November 25 – Patrick Nagel, American pop art illustrator (d. 1984)
- December 18 – Nasser Khalili, Iranian-British collector, art scholar, investor and philanthropist
- date unknown
  - Suzanne Lacy, American installation, video and performance artist
  - Daisy Youngblood, American ceramic artist and sculptor
  - Astrid Preston, American artist, writer and painter

== Deaths ==
- January 3 - René Gimpel, French art dealer (b. 1881)
- January 7 – Alexander Stirling Calder, American sculptor (b. 1870)
- February 7 – H. J. Ward, American illustrator (b. 1909)
- February 21 – Anne Marie Carl-Nielsen, Danish sculptor (born 1863)
- March 5 – Albert Richards, English war artist (b. 1919); killed on active service in the Netherlands
- March 6 – Milena Pavlović-Barili, Serbian painter and poet (b. 1909); died in riding accident in the United States
- March 10 – Eleanor Fortescue-Brickdale, English painter (b. 1872)
- March 31 – Hando Ruus, Estonian painter (b. 1917); presumed executed as a prisoner of war in the Soviet Union
- April – Josef Čapek, Czech painter and writer (b. 1887); died in Bergen-Belsen concentration camp
- April 22 – Käthe Kollwitz, German painter, lithographer and sculptor (b. 1867)
- May 5 – René Lalique, French glass designer (b. 1860)
- June 15 – Nikola Avramov, Bulgarian painter (b. 1897)
- September 16 – David Young Cameron, Scottish painter and etcher (b. 1865)
- October 24 – Franklin Carmichael, Canadian painter (b. 1890)
- October 31 – Ignacio Zuloaga, Basque painter (b. 1870)
- November 23 – Ljubomir Ivanović, Serbian painter (b. 1882)
- November – Thomas Hennell, English painter (b. 1903); presumed killed on active service in Indonesia
- December 20 – Ong Schan Tchow, Chinese artist (b. 1900); died in Malaysia
- date unknown
  - John Duncan, Scottish symbolist painter (b. 1866)
  - Franz Sedlacek, Austrian painter (b. 1891); presumed killed on active service in Poland

== See also ==
- 1945 in fine arts of the Soviet Union
