= 1909 in art =

Events from the year 1909 in art.

== Events ==
- February 20 – Filippo Tommaso Marinetti's Futurist Manifesto is first published, in the French newspaper Le Figaro.
- May 12 – Unveiling of the statue of Mahaska in Oskaloosa, Iowa
- May–June – Claude Monet's Water Lilies series of paintings are first exhibited, at Paul Durand-Ruel's gallery in Paris.
- July 22 – Widowed Irish-born painter John Lavery marries Irish American painter Hazel Martyn.
- Guillaume Apollinaire's first book of poetry is illustrated with woodcuts by André Derain.
- Léon Bakst begins painting scenery for Sergei Diaghilev's Ballets Russes, beginning with Cleopatra.
- Robert Delaunay begins painting his Saint-Sévrin, City and Eiffel Tower series.
- Lithuanian Jewish sculptor Jacques Lipchitz moves to Paris to study and work.
- Pablo Picasso and Georges Braque create the first works of analytical cubism.
- Sonderbund westdeutscher Kunstfreunde und Künstler established in Düsseldorf.
- Kunsthalle Mannheim established as a permanent art gallery.
- Reformation Wall created in Geneva by Swiss architects Charles Dubois, Alphonse Laverrière, Eugène Monod and Jean Taillens with figures by French sculptors Paul Landowski and Henri Bouchard.

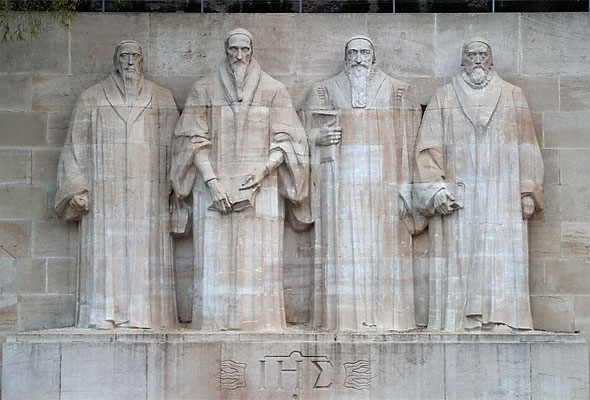
At the centre of the Reformation Wall are statues of William Farel, John Calvin, Theodore Beza and John Knox

- Sergey Prokudin-Gorsky is commissioned by Nicholas II of Russia to begin a record in color photography of his empire.
- Henri Gaudier meets Sophie Brzeska at the Bibliothèque Sainte-Geneviève in Paris.
- Hugo von Tschudi loans Paul Gauguin's painting Te tamari no atua (1896) to the Alte Nationalgalerie in Berlin, of which he is Director. This causes his immediate dismissal by Kaiser Wilhelm II and he moves to become Director of the Neue Pinakothek in Munich (Bavaria), taking the painting with him.
- Wilhelm von Bode purchases the wax bust Flora cheaply from a London dealer for the Kaiser Friedrich Museum in Berlin, believing it to be by Leonardo da Vinci. It is subsequently shown to be early 19th century English, probably by Richard Cockle Lucas.

== Works ==
- Lawrence Alma-Tadema – A Favourite Custom (Tate Britain)
- Giacomo Balla – Street Light
- George Bellows
  - Blue Morning
  - The Lone Tenement
  - Summer Night, Riverside Drive
- Gutzon Borglum – Rabboni (sculpture, Rock Creek Cemetery, Washington, D.C.)
- Antoine Bourdelle – Hercules the Archer (bronze)
- Milly Childers – The Terrace (Palace of Westminster)
- Mikalojus Konstantinas Čiurlionis
  - Angels (Paradise)
  - Fairy Tale Castle
  - Kings' Fairy Tale
  - Lightning
  - Rural Cemetery
- Charles Fouqueray – La Reconquista de Buenos Aires
- J. W. Godward
  - At The Thermae
  - A Classical Beauty
  - Tympanistria
- Winslow Homer – Right and Left
- John Haberle – Night (New Britain Museum of American Art, New Britain, Connecticut)
- Erich Heckel – Bathers in the Reeds
- Robert Henri – Salome
- Wassily Kandinsky – The Blue Mountain
- Gustav Klimt
  - Lady with Hat and Feather Boa
  - The Tree of Life (Stoclet Frieze)
  - Judith II (Salomé)
- Boris Kustodiev
  - Promenade Along the Volga
  - Promenade Along the Volga II
- Frances MacDonald – Sleeping Princess
- Ambrose McEvoy – Euphemia
- Jacek Malczewski – At the Source
- Edward Middleton Manigault – The Rocket
- Henri Matisse – Dance (I)
- Edvard Munch – Self-portrait at the Clinic
- Gabriele Münter – Marianne von Werefkin
- William Orpen – Homage to Manet
- Pablo Picasso
  - Fruit Dish (Museum of Modern Art, New York)
  - Woman with a Fan (Pushkin Museum, Moscow)
- Howard Pyle – Marooned
- Henrietta Rae – Hylas and the Water Nymphs
- Pierre-Auguste Renoir - Claude Renoir in Clown Costume
- John Singer Sargent – Albanian Olive Gatherers
- Zinaida Serebriakova – At the Dressing-Table: Self-portrait
- Konstantin Somov – Mikhail Kuzmin
- Vardges Sureniants
  - Knight-Woman
  - Mkrtich Khrimian
  - Return of Queen Zabel of Armenia
- Lorado Taft – bronzes
  - Eternal Silence (Graceland Cemetery, Chicago)
  - Statue of George Washington (University of Washington, Seattle)
- Albert Chevallier Tayler – Elizabeth Barrett Browning - The Anniversary: "I love thee to the level of everyday's most quiet need"
- J. W. Waterhouse – Gather Ye Rosebuds While Ye May
- Statue atop the Rome Confederate Monument

== Births ==
=== January to June ===
- January 16 – Clement Greenberg, American art critic (d.1994).
- January 25 – Joseph Solman, American painter (d. 2008).
- February 7 – Wilhelm Freddie, Danish painter and sculptor (d. 1995).
- February 12 – Zoran Mušič, Slovenian- born painter (d. 2005).
- February 17 – Gertrude Abercrombie, American painter (d. 1977).
- February 19 – Enrico Donati, Italian- born American Surrealist painter and sculptor (d. 2008).
- February 26 – Michel Tapié, French artist, critic, curator, and art collector (d. 1987).
- March 8 – H. J. Ward, American illustrator (d. 1945).
- March 13 – Reynolds Stone, English wood engraver (d. 1979).
- March 22 – Milt Kahl, American animator (d. 1987).
- April 3 – Graham Stuart Thomas, English horticultural artist, author and garden designer (d. 2003).
- April 30 – F. E. McWilliam, Irish sculptor (d. 1992).
- May 17 – Giulio Carlo Argan, Italian art historian and politician (d. 1992).
- June 14 – Ettore DeGrazia, American impressionist, painter, sculptor and lithographer (d. 1982).
- June 26 – Wolfgang Reitherman, German-American animator (d. 1985).

=== July to December ===
- July 13 – Marie-Thérèse Walter, French mistress of Pablo Picasso (d. 1977).
- July 23 – Norman Lewis, American painter, scholar, and teacher (d. 1979)
- September 14 – Peter Scott, English ornithologist, conservationist, painter (d. 1989).
- September 23 – Marianne Straub, Swiss-born British textile designer (d. 1994).
- September 28 – Al Capp, cartoonist (d. 1979).
- October 13 – Herblock, political cartoonist (d. 2001).
- October 19 – Marguerite Perey, French physicist and academic (d. 1975)
- October 28 – Francis Bacon, Irish-born British figurative painter (d. 1992).
- November 5 – Milena Pavlović-Barili, Serbian painter and poet (d. 1945).
- November 6 – Herman Rose (Herman Rappaport), American painter (d. 2007).
- November 13 – Vincent Apap, Maltese sculptor (d. 2003)
- December 25 – Philip Zec, British political cartoonist (d. 1983).

=== Full date unknown ===
- Gabriel Hayes, Irish sculptor and coin designer (d. 1978).

== Deaths ==
- January 9 – Paul Gachet, French physician to artists, Impressionist art collector and amateur painter (b. 1828)
- February 11 – Russell Sturgis, American architect and art critic (b. 1836)
- February 20 – Paul Ranson, French painter and writer (b. 1864)
- February 26 – Caran d'Ache, French political cartoonist (b. 1858)
- April 20 – Hélène Bertaux, French sculptor and women's rights activist (b. 1825)
- June 22 – Edward John Gregory, English painter (b. 1850)
- . July 17 - Pinckney Marcius-Simons, American painter (b. 1867)
- August 23 – Adolf von Becker, Finnish painter (b. 1831)
- November 9 – William Powell Frith, English genre painter (b. 1819)
- November 21 – Peder Severin Krøyer, Norwegian painter (b. 1851)
- November 23 – Otto Sinding, Norwegian painter (b. 1842)
- November 25 – Cyprian Godebski, Polish sculptor and teacher (b. 1835)
