= Hugh Ward =

Hugh Ward may refer to:

- Aodh Buidhe Mac an Bhaird or Hugh Ward (c. 1593–1635), Irish Franciscan friar, poet, historian and hagiographer
- Hugh Jeffery Ward, American criminal who stole computer software
- Hugh Ward (bacteriologist) (1887–1972), Australian bacteriologist and Olympic rower
- Hugh J. Ward (1871–1941), American-born stage actor in Australia
- H. J. Ward (Hugh Joseph Ward, 1909–1945), American illustrator
- Hugh Ward (footballer) (born 1970), Scottish footballer
