= Women of the Confederacy =

Monument in Rome, Georgia, United States

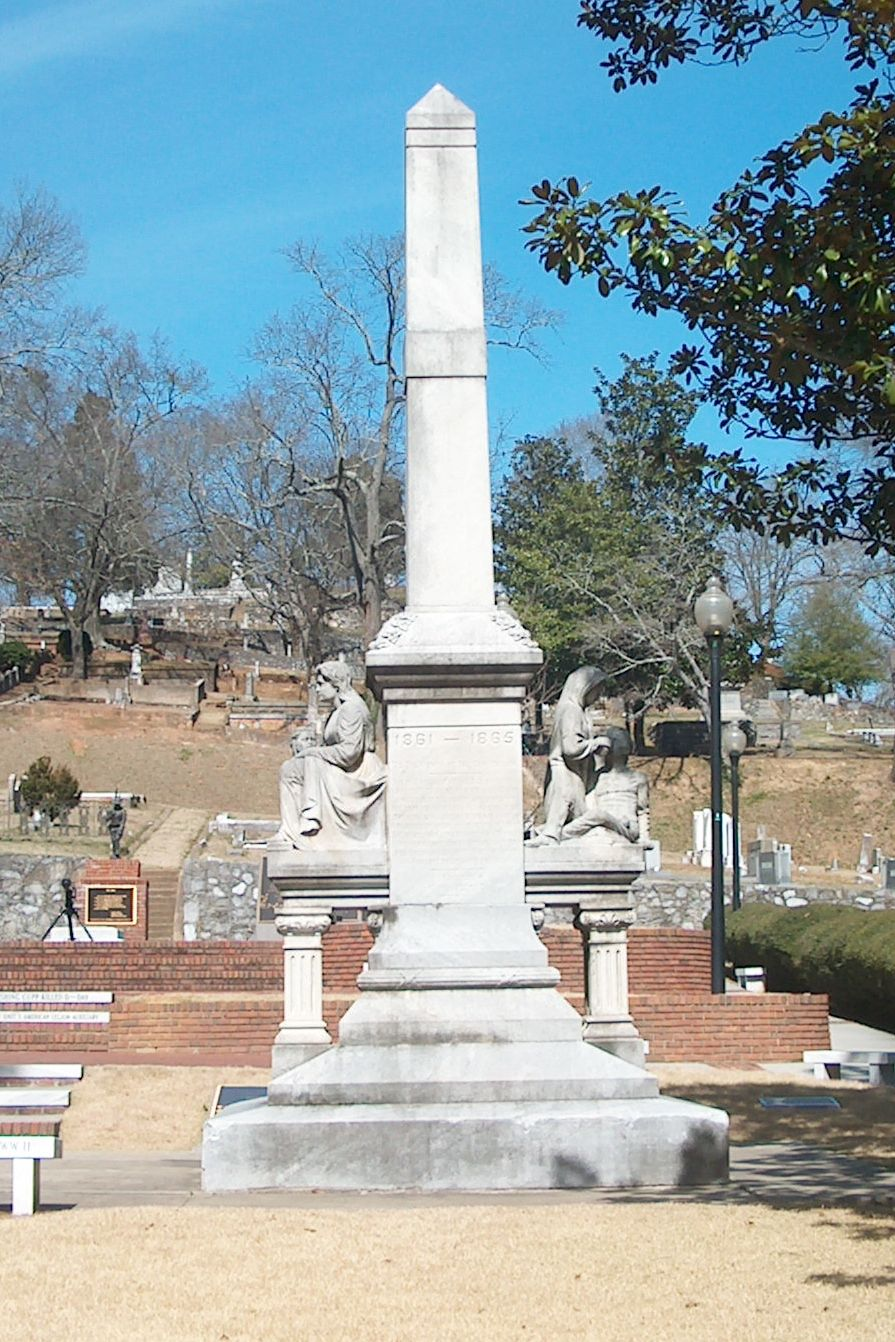
- The monument in 2009
- Interactive map of Women of the Confederacy
- Location: Myrtle Hill Cemetery, Rome, Georgia, United States
- Coordinates: 34°15′0.9″N 85°10′41.9″W
- Designer: John Walz
- Builder: Georgia Granite & Marble Company; Georgia Marble Works
- Type: Confederate monument
- Material: Georgia marble
- Length: 10 feet (3.0 m)
- Width: 10 feet (3.0 m)
- Height: 25 feet (7.6 m)
- Dedicated date: March 9, 1910
- Dedicated to: Women of the Confederate States of America

Women of the Confederacy is a monument in the Myrtle Hill Cemetery of Rome, Georgia, United States. It was erected in 1910 in honor of women of the Confederate States of America. The monument was commissioned by a local chapter of the United Sons of Confederate Veterans and designed by sculptor John Walz, with construction performed by the Georgia Granite & Marble Company and the Georgia Marble Works. It was originally located near the intersection of Broad Street and Third Avenue, next to the Nathan Bedford Forrest Monument. Both monuments were relocated to Myrtle Hill Cemetery in 1952.

== Design ==
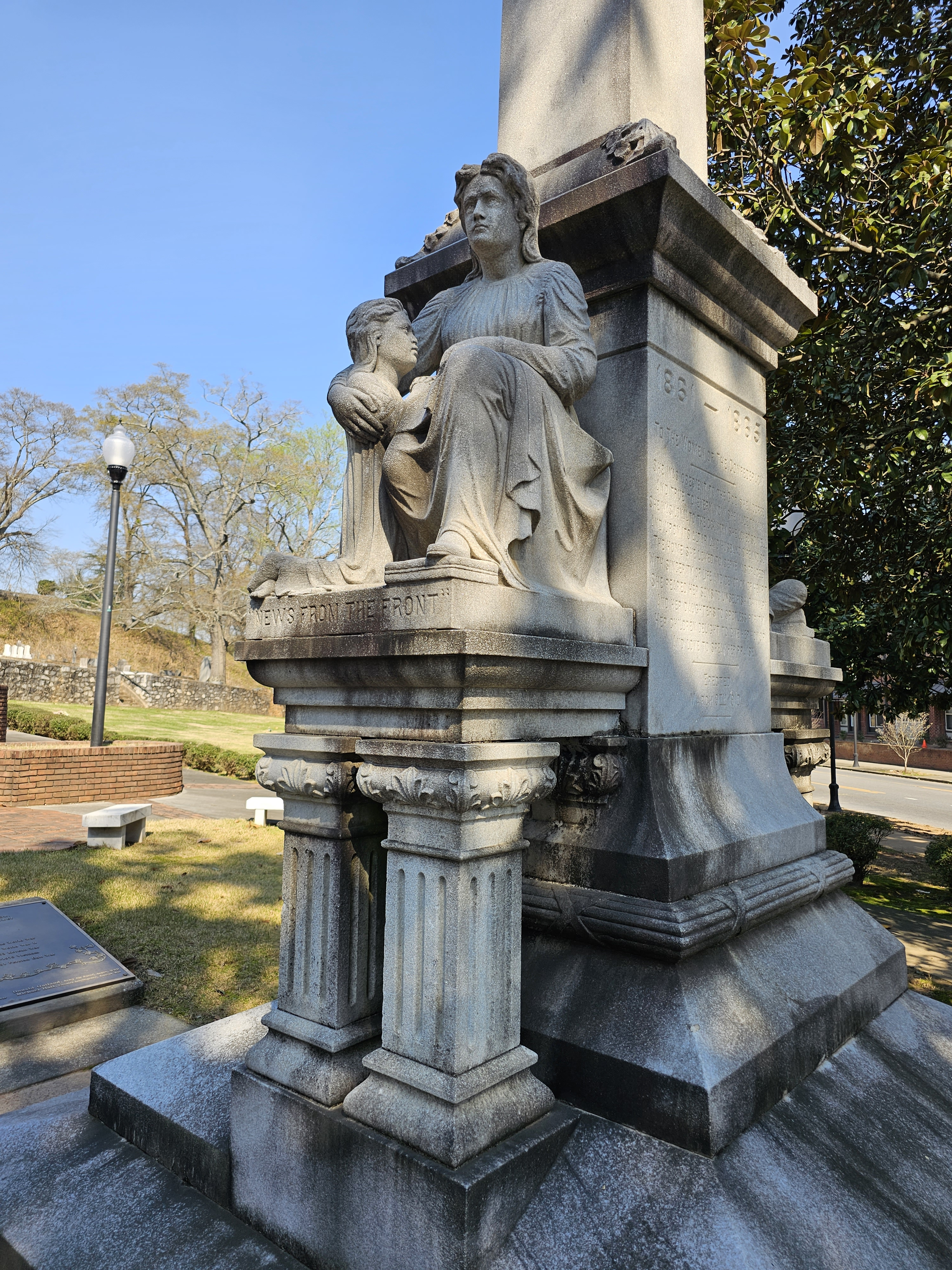
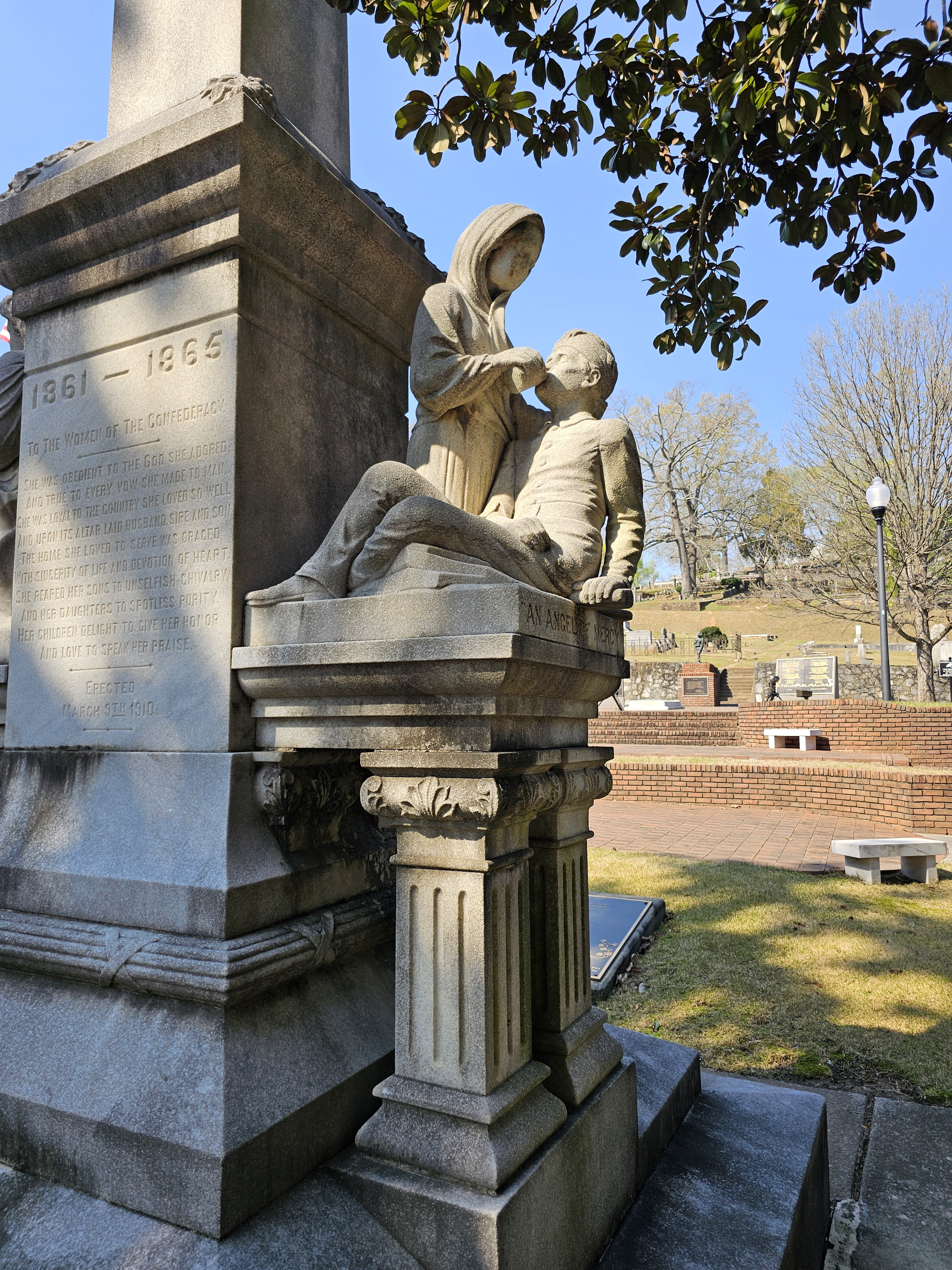
Closeup views of the monuments' two statues, pictured 2023

The monument consists of an obelisk surrounded on two sides by statues. One of the statues shows a mother comforting a daughter, while the other shows a nurse treating a wounded soldier, who is seated and is being given a cup of water by the nurse. The structure is made of Georgia marble and, including the base, stands approximately 25 feet (7.6 meters) tall. The base occupies a square area with side measurements of 10 ft (3.0 m).

The front of the sculpture bears the following inscription:

1861--1865 / TO THE WOMEN OF THE CONFEDERACY / --- / SHE WAS OBEDIENT TO THE GOD SHE ADORED / AND TRUE TO EVERY VOW SHE GAVE TO MAN. / SHE WAS LOYAL TO THE COUNTRY SHE LOVED SO WELL / AND UPON IT ALTAR LAID HUSBAND, SIRE, AND SON. / THE HOME SHE LOVED TO SERVE WAS GRACED / WITH SINCERITY OF LIFE AND DEVOTION OF HEART. / SHE REARED HER SONS TO UNSELFISH CHIVALRY / AND HER DAUGHTERS TO SPOTLESS PURITY. / HER CHILDREN DELIGHT TO GIVE HER HONOR / AND LOVE TO SPEAK HER PRAISES / ERECTED / MARCH 9TH 1910

Meanwhile, the statue featuring the soldier has "AN ANGEL OF MERCY" inscribed beneath it, while the statue featuring the daughter has "NEWS FROM THE FRONT" inscribed underneath.

== History ==
The monument was created by Floyd Camp No. 469, a local chapter of the United Sons of Confederate Veterans. The camp provided $4,500 in funding, while the remainder of the money needed for the monument's creation was provided by donations from local Masonic lodges, Elks lodges, and citizens. It was designed by sculptor John Walz and fabricated by the Georgia Granite & Marble Company and the Georgia Marble Works. According to a 1922 book on the history of Rome and Floyd County, Georgia, the monument was one of the first to honor women of the Confederate States.

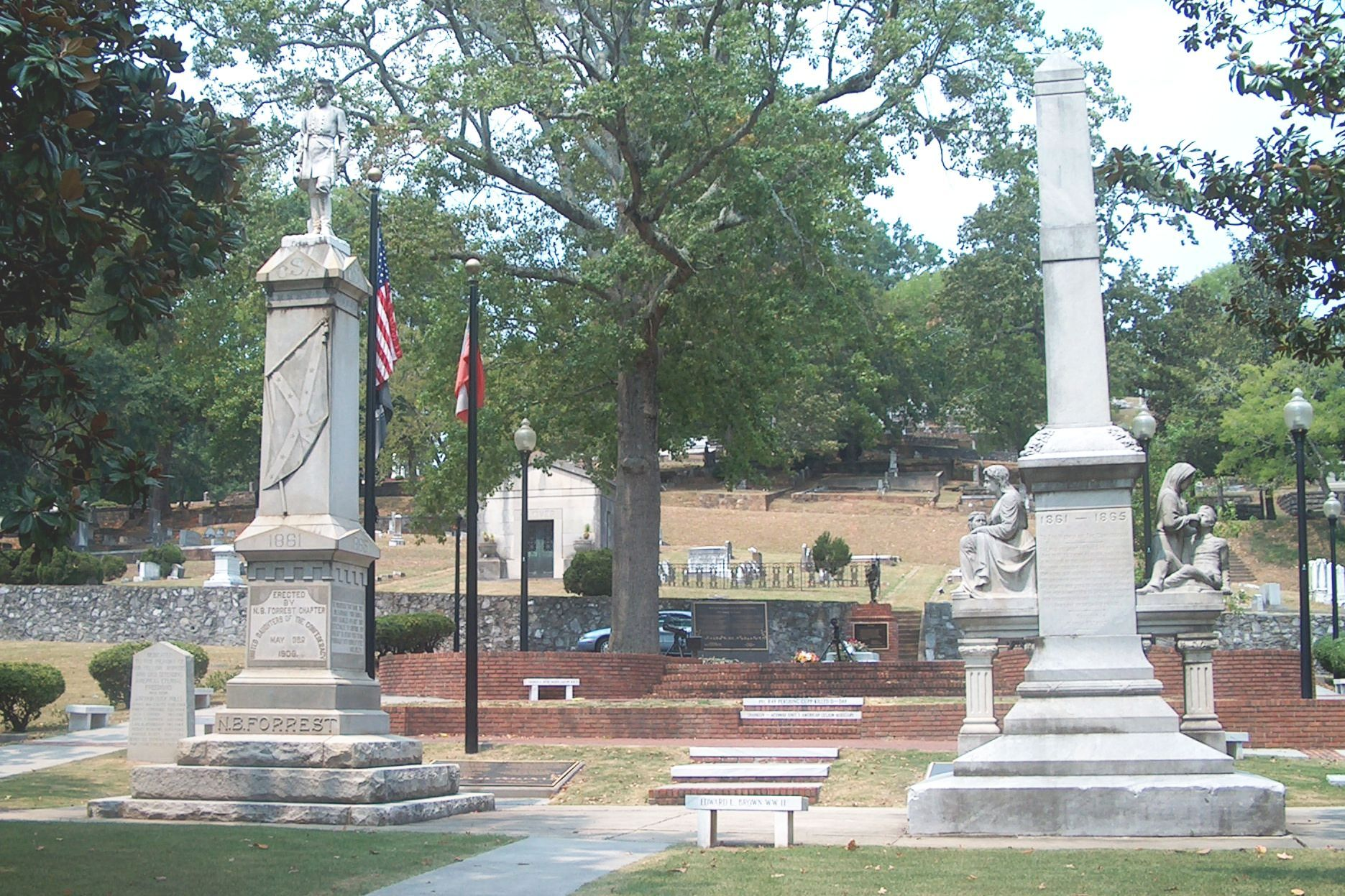
The monument (right) next to the Nathan Bedford Forrest Monument in Myrtle Hill Cemetery, pictured 2007

The monument was dedicated on March 9, 1910. Originally, it was located near the intersection of Broad Street and Third Avenue, in an area known as Rome's Cotton Block. It was erected next to the Nathan Bedford Forrest Monument, which had been erected by the local chapter of the United Daughters of the Confederacy. However, in 1952, both of the monuments were removed from the location due to traffic concerns. On December 30 of that year, both monuments were relocated to Myrtle Hill Cemetery, which is also the site of the Rome Confederate Monument. In 1993, the monument was surveyed as part of the Save Outdoor Sculpture! project. In 2002, the part of the cemetery near the Women of the Confederacy monument was incorporated into a newly developed section called Veteran's Plaza, which was centered on the Tomb of the Known Soldier. Both the Women monument and the Forrest monument were used to ornament the plaza.

== See also ==
- 1910 in art
- Confederate Mothers Memorial Park
- Confederate Mothers Monument
- Confederate Women's Monument
- Florida's Tribute to the Women of the Confederacy
- Ladies' Confederate Memorial
- List of Confederate monuments and memorials in Georgia
- Memorial to the Women of the Confederacy
- Monument to Confederate Women
- Monument to North Carolina Women of the Confederacy
- Tennessee Confederate Women's Monument
