= McNeel Marble Works =

American masonry company

The McNeel Marble Works of Marietta, Georgia, was founded in 1892 by Morgan Louis McNeel and his brother, Robert Mills McNeel. Its location near the Blue Ridge Mountains provided the firm with access to areas where marble and granite could be quarried.

The firm is best remembered for the Civil War monuments it constructed in the southern states of the United States.

== Selected works ==
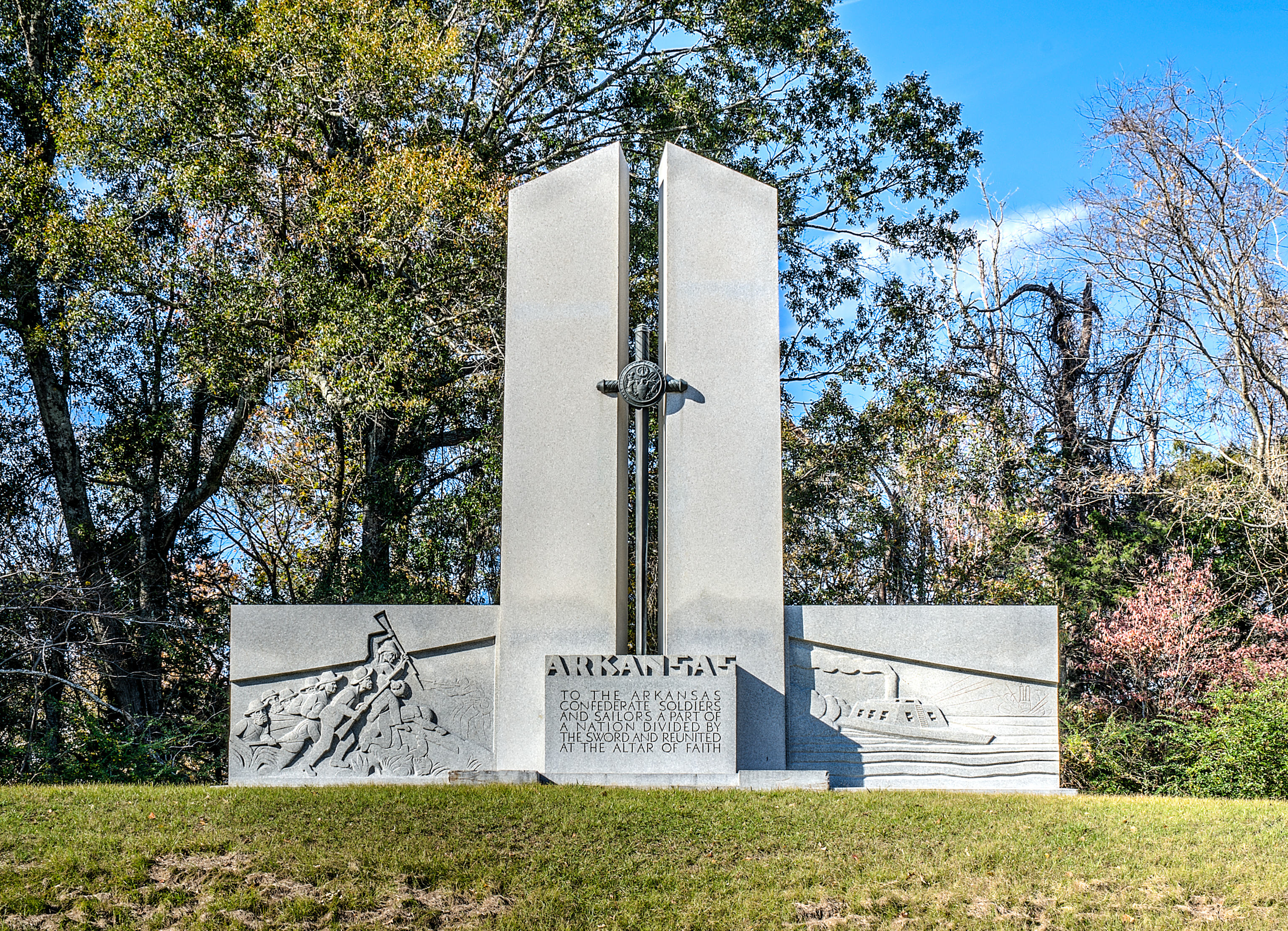
Arkansas Memorial

- Chester Confederate Monument (1905)
- John Brown Gordon statue, pedestal, Atlanta, Georgia (1907)
- At Rest Arms, Thomaston, Georgia, (1908)
- Nathan Bedford Forrest Monument, Rome, Georgia (1908)
- Comrades, Statesboro, Georgia, (1909)
- Statue atop the Rome Confederate Monument, Rome, Georgia (1909)
- Jasper County Confederate Monument a.k.a. Comrades Monticello, Georgia, (1910)
- Illinois Monument, Kennesaw Mountain, Georgia, (1914)
- Florida's Tribute to the Women of the Confederacy, Jacksonville, Florida, (1915), Allen George Newman, sculptor
- Statue of Sterling Price (1915), Keytesville, Chariton County, Missouri, Allen Newman, sculptor
- Arkansas Memorial at Vicksburg National Military Park, 1954. The memorial was designed by William Henry Deacy.
