= Rome Confederate Monument =

Monument in Rome, Georgia, United States

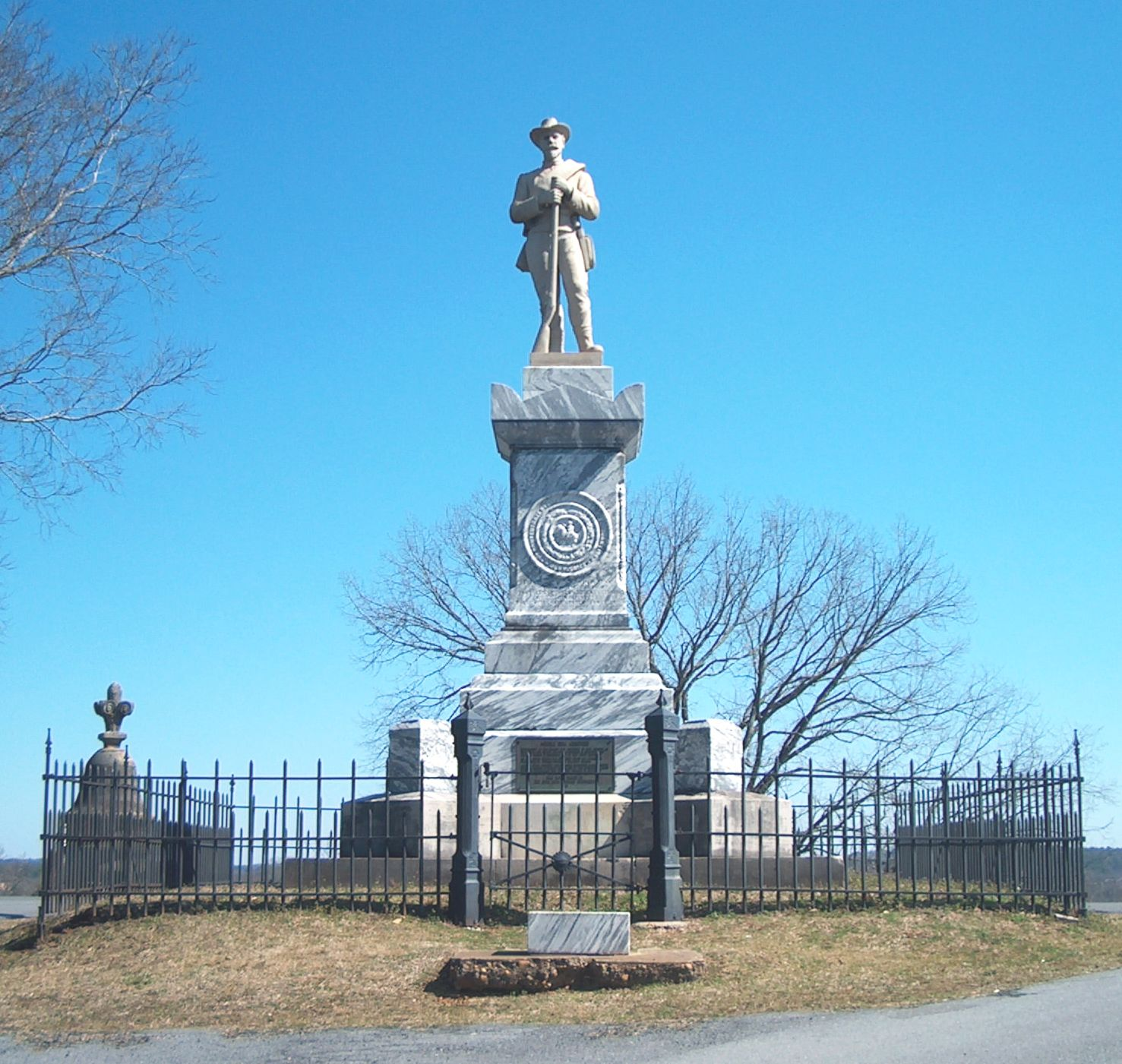
- The monument in 2009, prior to the statue's removal in 2017
- Interactive map of Rome Confederate Monument
- Location: Myrtle Hill Cemetery, Rome, Georgia, United States
- Coordinates: 34°15′7″N 85°10′42″W
- Builder: McNeel Marble Works (statue)
- Type: Confederate monument
- Material: Georgia marble (statue); Stone (pedestal)
- Length: 12 feet (3.7 m)
- Width: 12 feet (3.7 m)
- Height: 17 feet 4 inches (5.28 m)
- Completion date: 1886 or 1887
- Dedicated date: April 26, 1887; April 26, 1909 (rededication)
- Dedicated to: Soldiers of the Confederate States Army from Floyd County, Georgia

The Rome Confederate Monument, also known as the Floyd County Soldiers Monument, is a partially dismantled monument in the Myrtle Hill Cemetery of Rome, Georgia, United States. It was erected by a local Ladies' Memorial Association and was dedicated in 1887 in honor of Confederate States Army soldiers from Floyd County, Georgia. It originally consisted of an urn atop a pedestal, but in 1909, the urn was replaced by a statue of a soldier and the monument was rededicated. In 2017, the statue was damaged in an act of vandalism, prompting the city to remove it from the monument.

== Design ==
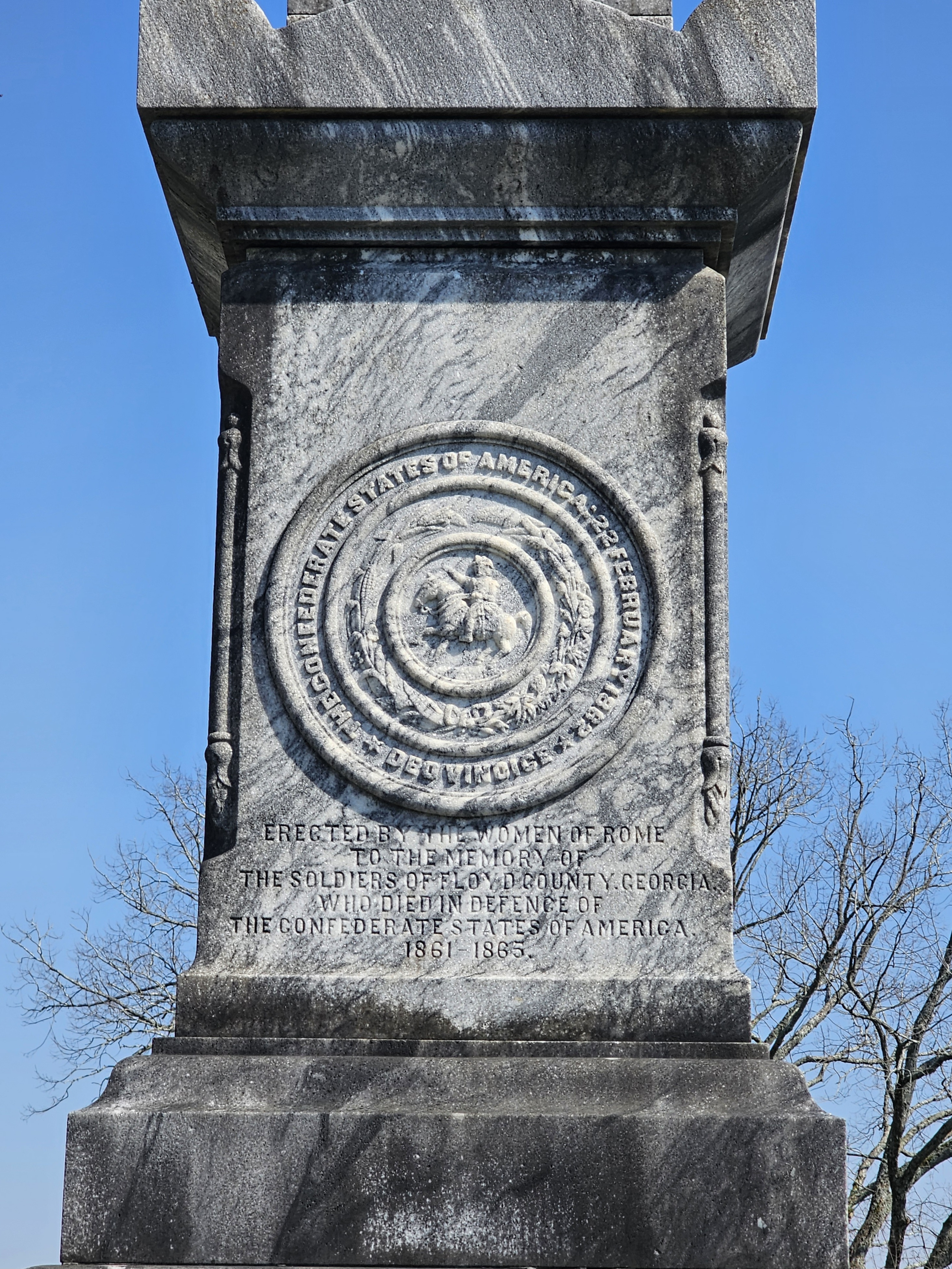
The front of the pedestal, bearing the seal of the Confederate States

The monument is located at the peak of the hill that Myrtle Hill Cemetery is located upon. In its initial configuration, the monument consisted of an urn atop a pedestal. However, the urn was later replaced by a statue of a soldier, which is one of the most common designs for Confederate monuments in Georgia. The statue depicts a person wearing the uniform of a Confederate States Army soldier, with an ammunition case and bayonet attached to his left hip. A bedroll is also slung over his left shoulder and attached to his right hip. He is holding a gun, with both of his hands gripping the barrel and the stock resting on his right foot. The statue faced westwards.

The pedestal is made of stone, while the statue is made of Georgia marble. The total height of the monument, including the statue and pedestal, was roughly 17 feet 4 inches (5.28 meters), while the base covers a square area with sides measuring 12 ft (3.7 m). The entire structure is surrounded by a fence made of cast iron.

The pedestal bears several inscriptions. On the sides is the following:

THIS MONUMENT / IS THE TESTIMONY OF THE PRESENT / TO THE FUTURE THAT THESE WERE / THEY WHO KEPT THE FAITH AS IT WAS / GIVEN THEM BY THEIR FATHERS. / BE IT KNOWN BY THIS TOKEN / THAT THESE MEN WERE TRUE TO THE / TRADITIONS OF THEIR LINEAGE. / BOLD GENEROUS AND FREE / FIRM IN CONVICTION OF THE RIGHT / READY AT THEIR COUNTRY'S CALL / STEADFAST IN THEIR DUTY / FAITHFUL EVEN IN DESPAIR: / AND ILLUSTRATED / IN THE UNFLINCHING HEROISM / OF THEIR DEATHS / THE FREE BORN COURAGE OF THEIR LIVES.

HOW WELL / THEY SERVED THEIR FAITH / THEIR PEOPLE KNOW, / A THOUSAND BATTLE FIELDS ATTEST; / DUNGEON AND HOSPITAL BEAR WITNESS / TO THEIR SONS THEY LEFT / BUT HONOR AND THEIR COUNTRY. / LET THIS STONE FOREVER WARN / THOSE WHO KEPT THESE VALLEYS / THAT ONLY THEIR SIRES ARE DEAD: / THE PRINCIPLES FOR WHICH THEY / FOUGHT CAN NEVER DIE.

The front of the base has the following: ERECTED BY THE WOMEN OF ROME / TO THE MEMORY OF / THE SOLDIERS OF FLOYD COUNTY, GEORGIA / WHO DIED IN DEFENCE OF / THE CONFEDERATE STATES OF AMERICA / 1861-1865. Meanwhile, the back bears the following: THEY HAVE CROSSED THE RIVER / AND SLEEP BENEATH THE SHADE. Additionally, the front and back bear the seal of the Confederate States and an emblem of the Daughters of the Confederate States of America.

== History ==
=== Creation and dedications ===
Efforts to erect the monument began in either 1868 or 1869 and were led by the local Ladies' Memorial Association, given in some sources as the "Women of Rome". In addition to creating the monument, the association had also been responsible for overseeing the cemetery's section for Civil War soldiers. The association began fundraising for the monument's construction, with Georgia Governor Rufus Bullock being one of the first contributors to the project. Fundraising efforts lasted several years, in part because the association lost funds in the Panic of 1873. The monument, in its original design featuring the urn, was installed in the cemetery in either 1886 or 1887. In total, the monument cost $1,000 (equivalent to $35,800 in 2025), while the cast iron fence surrounding the monument, manufactured by the Noble & McCullough Foundry, cost $112 ($4,000 in 2025). The monument was dedicated on Memorial Day, April 26, 1887.

Throughout the late 19th and early 20th centuries, the Ladies' Memorial Association continued fundraising with the goal of replacing the monument's urn with a statue of a soldier. On January 4, 1887, the city government of Rome donated $100 ($3,600 in 2025) for this goal. The urn was replaced around 1909 and the monument was rededicated on April 26, 1909. (Note: In an article in the New Georgia Encyclopedia, a year of 1910 is given for the urn replacement and monument rededication.) The statue cost at least $1,000 ($35,800 in 2025) and was created by the McNeel Marble Works, with C. M. Pennington serving as the architect overseeing its placement.

=== Later history and vandalism ===
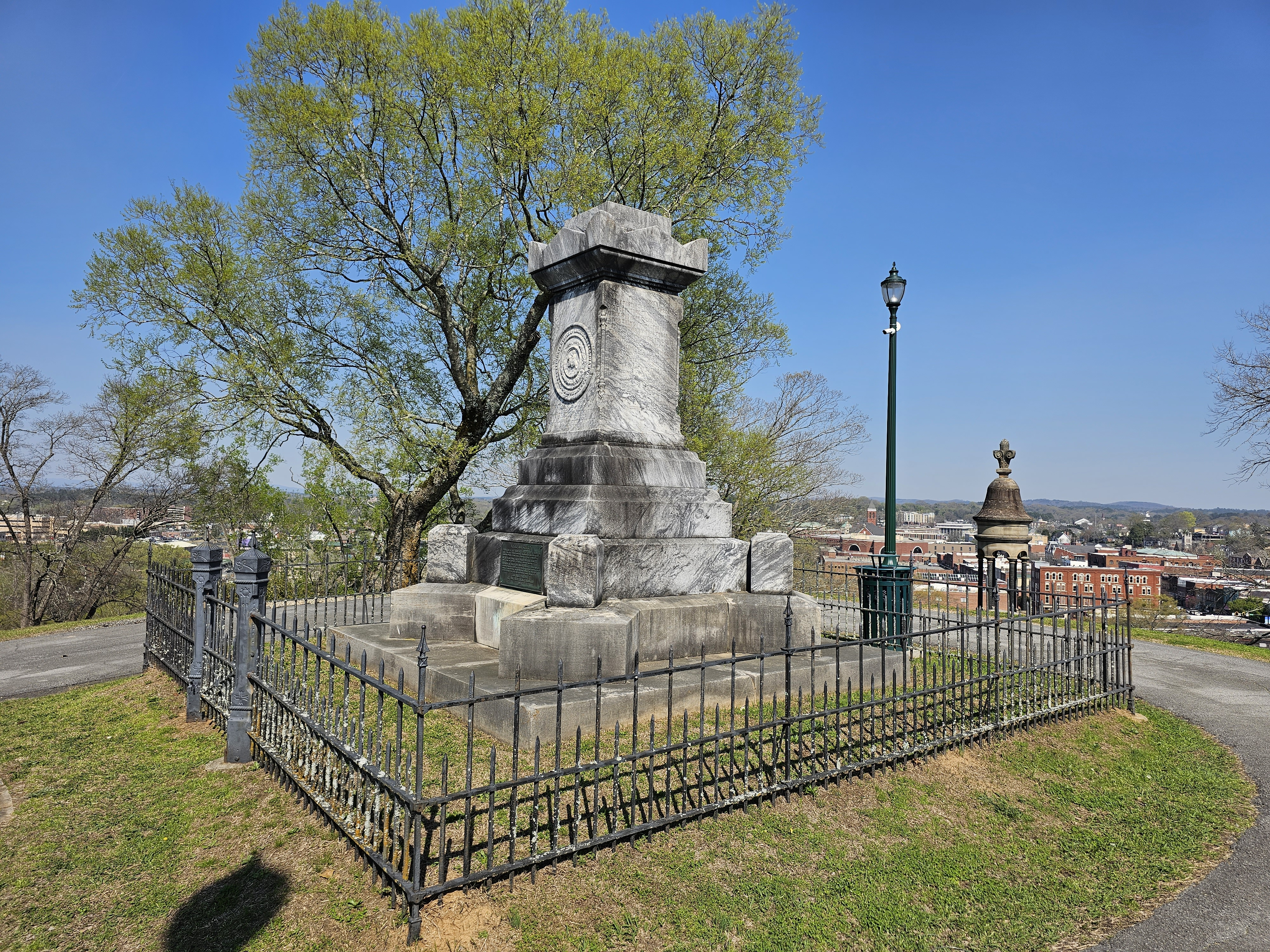
The monument in 2023, following the statue's removal

In 1975, the Rome Area Heritage Foundation, a local nonprofit historic preservation organization, installed a plaque to the base of the monument with information about the cemetery. In 1993, the monument was surveyed as part of the Save Outdoor Sculpture! project.

In December 2017, the monument's statue was vandalized, with significant damage to the head and arms. Additionally, the hands and the rifle had been removed. Following the incident, Stan Rogers, the cemetery's director, estimated that the damages amounted to about $200,000 ($262,700 in 2025). The statue was removed from the pedestal on December 21. Following the vandalism, a subsidiary of the Rome Area Heritage Foundation initiated a fundraising program to finance repairs. In early 2018, the city government had received several proposals for the statue's repair and reinstallation, with estimates of $42,000 and $57,000 ($53,800 and $73,100 in 2025). However, insurance for the monument paid out only $25,000 ($32,100 in 2025). In 2021, the Rome News-Tribune reported that the statue was still in storage.

== See also ==
- 1887 in art
- 1909 in art
- List of Confederate monuments and memorials in Georgia
- Nathan Bedford Forrest Monument (Rome, Georgia)
- Removal of Confederate monuments and memorials
- Women of the Confederacy
