= The Rocket (painting) =

1909 painting by Edward Middleton Manigault

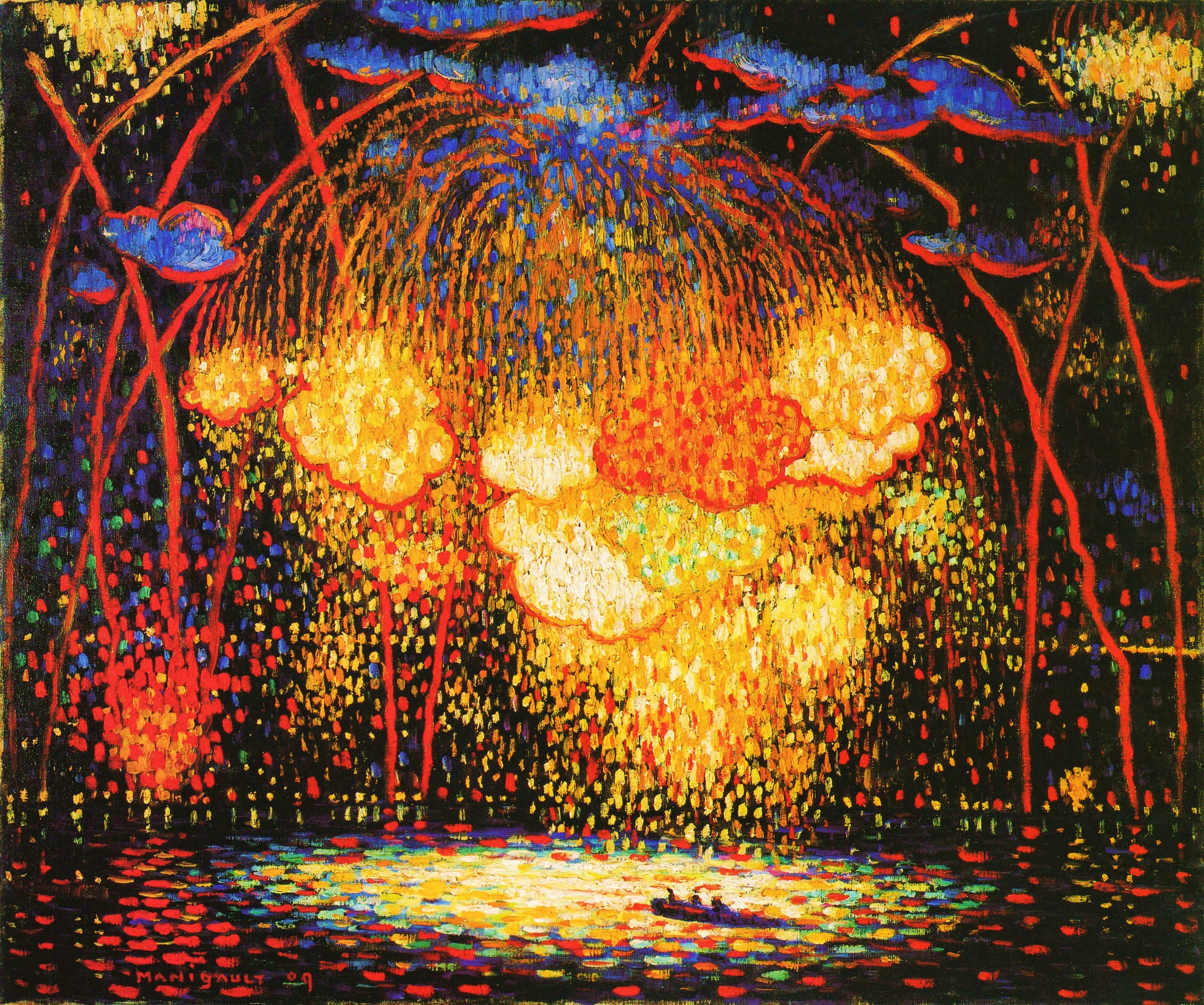
- Artist: Edward Middleton Manigault
- Year: 1909
- Medium: Oil on canvas
- Dimensions: 20 cm × 24 cm (7.9 in × 9.4 in)
- Location: Columbus Museum of Art; Columbus, Ohio, US

The Rocket is a 1909 oil on canvas painting by Edward Middleton Manigault. It depicts a fireworks display over water, in the fall of 1909 on the Hudson River. The painting shows an intense, almost fauvist color palette. In the middle of a radiant circle of light reflecting on the water, a boat can be seen, filled with people viewing the fireworks from the river.

== Background ==
Edward Middleton Manigault (1887–1922) was considered an experimental, visionary artist and today he is seen as an early representative of the Modernist movement from Canada and America. He was born in London, Ontario.

The artist may have been inspired by the sight of firework displays along the Hudson River in the fall of 1909, commemorating Henry Hudson's discovery of the river in 1609 and the launching of Robert Fulton's steamboat Clermont in 1807. This was one of the first steamboats, and the first one to float on the Hudson.

== Painting ==
As an artist, Manigault was considered by art historians to have developed a highly personal and original artistic style. Disconnected patches of luminous golden, red and orange colors overflow the canvas, creating the effect of the light of the fireworks showering down over the river; the river in turn acts as a mirror, reflecting the display above. The artist used glowing colors to create a vivid depiction, applying the post-impressionist techniques that he had learnt in the early years of his career.

These post-impressionist techniques had been developed and used during the last years of the 19th century by, among others, artists like Van Gogh and Gauguin, and the pointillist painters Seurat and Signac. The first two artists used bold, vibrant intense colors, while Seurat's pointillism consisted of creating the image by means of colored dots.
