= Nathan Bedford Forrest Monument (Rome, Georgia) =

Monument in Rome, Georgia, United States

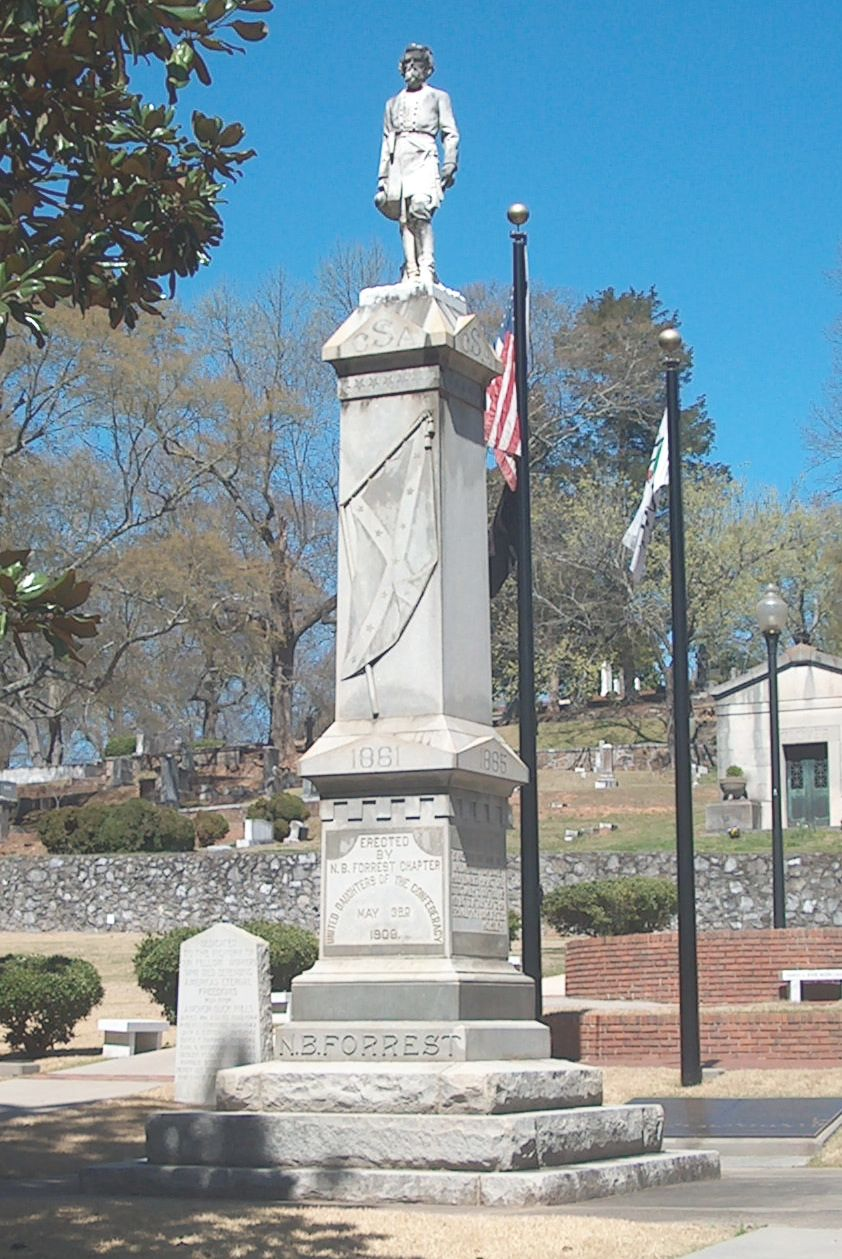
- The monument in 2007, prior to the statue's removal in 2021
- Interactive map of Nathan Bedford Forrest Monument
- Location: Myrtle Hill Cemetery, Rome, Georgia, United States
- Coordinates: 34°15′0.5″N 85°10′42″W
- Designer: John Walz
- Builder: McNeel Marble Works; J. W. Wiley (contractor)
- Type: Statue
- Material: Granite; Carrara marble (statue)
- Length: 10 feet (3.0 m)
- Width: 10 feet (3.0 m)
- Height: 25 feet (7.6 m)
- Weight: 62,000 pounds (28,000 kg) or 64,000 pounds (29,000 kg)
- Dedicated date: May 3, 1908
- Dedicated to: Nathan Bedford Forrest

The Nathan Bedford Forrest Monument is a partially dismantled monument at Myrtle Hill Cemetery in Rome, Georgia, United States. It was dedicated in the early 1900s in honor of Nathan Bedford Forrest, a general in the Confederate States Army during the American Civil War. It was initially located in the median of Broad Street near Second Street, but was relocated to the cemetery in 1952 due to traffic issues. In the 2020s, the monument came under increased scrutiny, prompting the statue to be removed in 2021.

The monument was commissioned by the local chapter of the United Daughters of the Confederacy. Forrest had been a popular figure in Rome due to his actions during the war, which included the 1863 capture of Colonel Abel Streight, who had planned to lead a Union army raid across North Georgia. In 1910, another Confederate monument commissioned by the Sons of Confederate Veterans was installed next to the monument. Both were relocated to Myrtle Hill Cemetery, where they remained next to each other and were later incorporated into the Veteran's Plaza, an area of the cemetery centered on the Tomb of the Known Soldier.

The monument became the subject of criticism and calls for removal in the early 21st century, especially amidst the George Floyd protests in 2020, due to Forrest's actions in both the Civil War and afterwards, which included a stint as the inaugural grand wizard of the Ku Klux Klan. In mid-2020, the city commission voted unanimously to relocate the statue, and it was removed from the monument in January 2021. Later that year, the statue was relocated to the Rome Area History Museum.

== Design ==
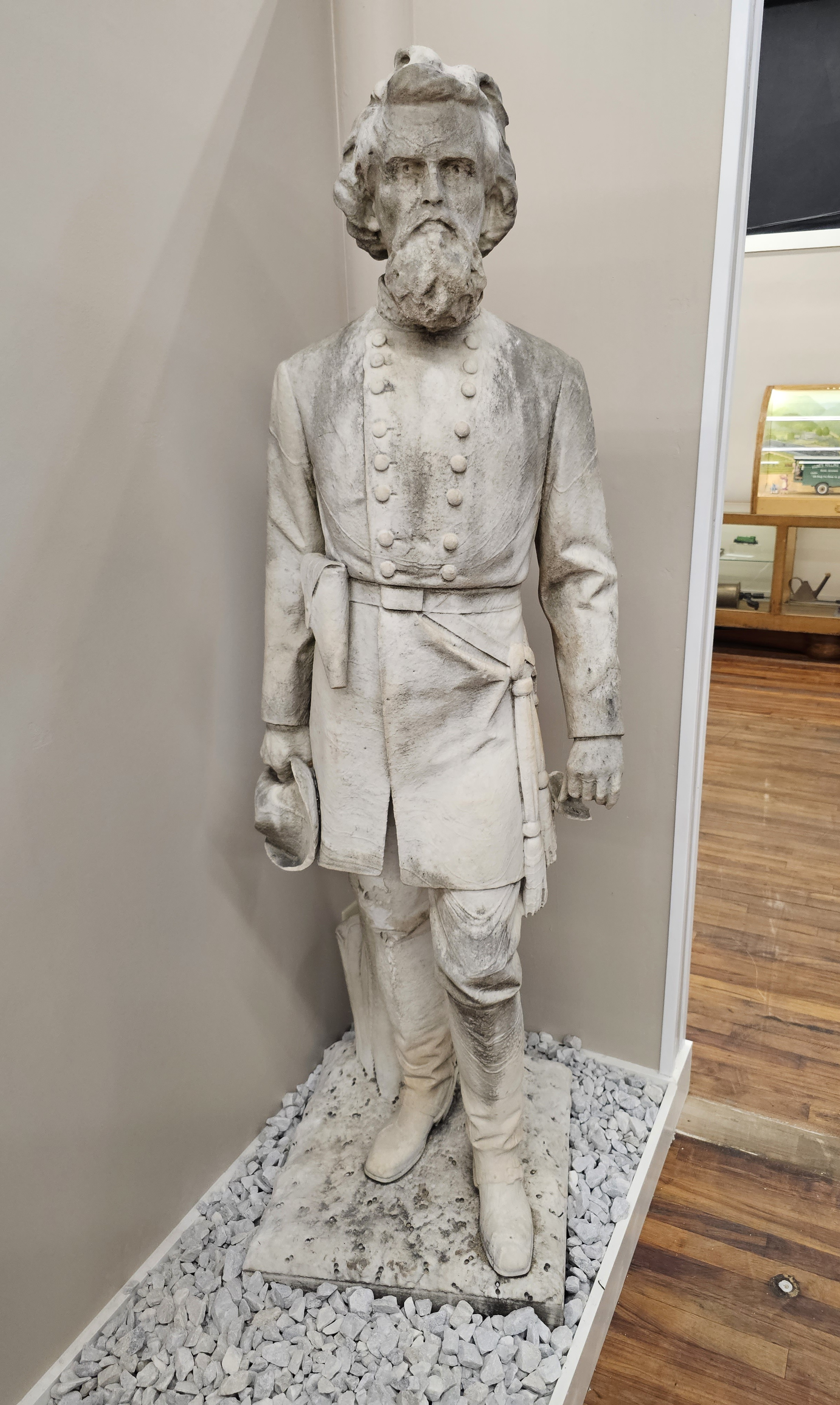
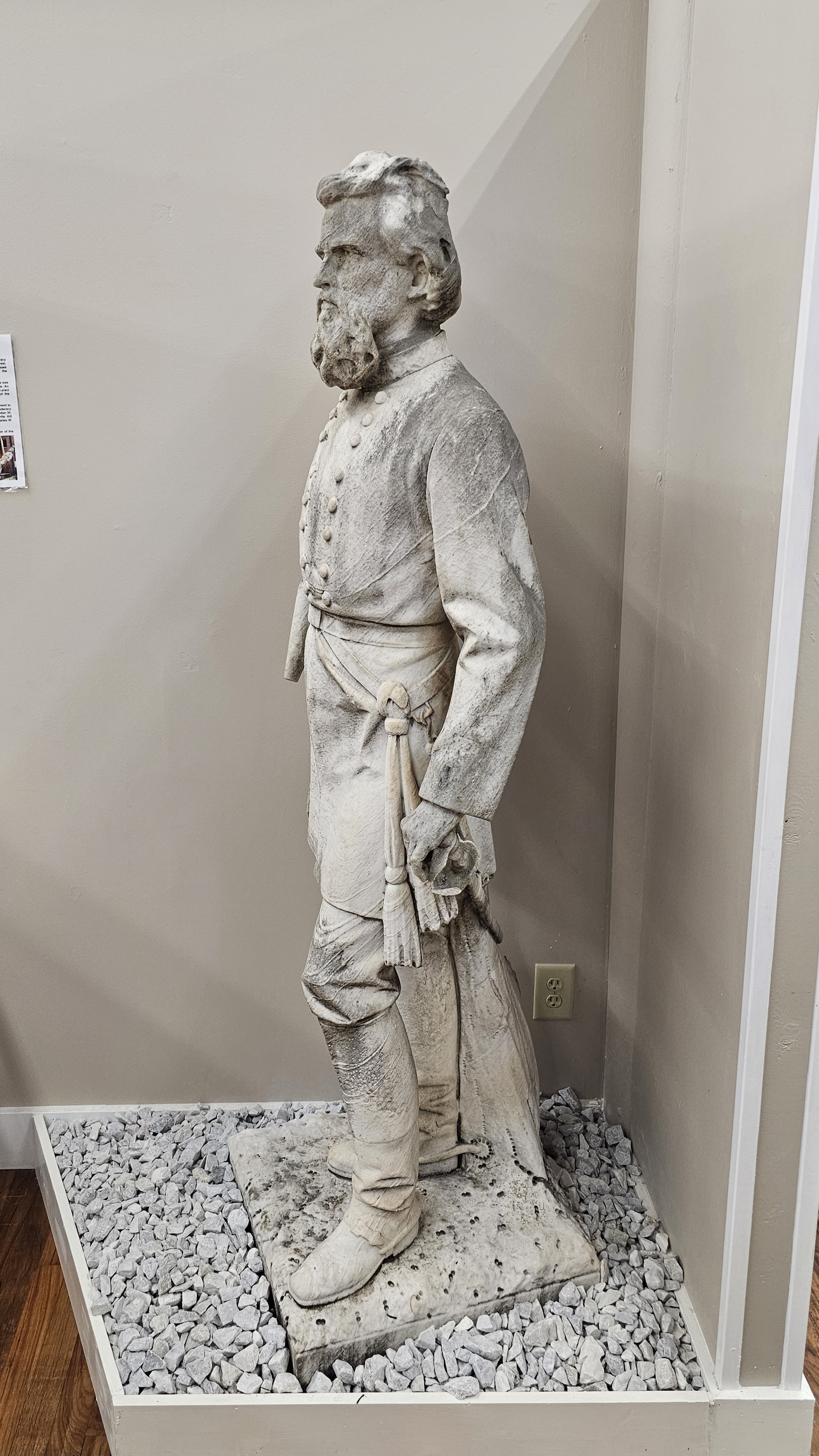
Closeup views of the statue of Forrest, pictured 2023

The monument consisted of a granite shaft topped by a statue of Nathan Bedford Forrest made of Carrara marble. (Note: The materials here are given in a 1911 book on Confederate monuments. However, the monument's listing in the Smithsonian Institution Research Information System lists that the entirety of the monument is made of marble, without specifying the type.) In total, the structure had a height of 25 feet (7.6 meters), including the statue, and covered a square area with side measurements of 10 ft (3.0 m). Sources vary on the overall weight of the monument, which is reported as either 62,000 pounds (28,000 kilograms) or 64,000 lb (29,000 kg).

Forrest is depicted in a military uniform, holding a hat in his right hand while his left hand rests on the handle of a holstered sword. The shaft has four sides, with images engraved on several of the sides. These include a Confederate battle flag with a broken staff on the front and cavalry motifs (such as a bugle and a short sword) on the other sides. Above the flag, the letters "C. S. A." are inscribed, while beneath the flag is the following:

1861. / ERECTED / BY/ N. B. FORREST CHAPTER / UNITED DAUGHTERS OF THE CONFEDERACY, / MAY 3RD, / 1908. / N. B. FORREST.

The front and back of the monument are inscribed with the year "1861", while the sides are inscribed with "1865". The left and right sides of the monument feature quotes about Forrest and the soldiers under his command from P. G. T. Beauregard, William Tecumseh Sherman, and Garnet Wolseley, 1st Viscount Wolseley, while the rear contains a brief description of Forrest's military actions as they pertain to Rome during the American Civil War. The quotes, all in raised lettering, are as follows:

"FORREST'S CAPACITY FOR WAR / SEEMED ONLY TO BE LIMITED BY THE / OPPORTUNITIES FOR ITS DISPLAY." / GEN. BEAUREGARD. / "HIS CALVARY WILL TRAVEL / A HUNDRED MILES IN LESS / TIME THAN OURS WILL TEN." / GEN. W. T. SHERMAN.

"HE POSSESSED THAT RARE TACT, / UNLEARNABLE FROM BOOKS, / WHICH ENABLED HIM, NOT ONLY / EFFECTUALLY, TO CONTROL HIS / MEN, BUT TO ATTACH THEM TO HIM, / PERSONALLY, 'WITH HOOKS OF STEEL'". / WOLSELEY.

ON SUNDAY, MAY 3RD, 1863, / GEN. NATHAN BEDFORD FORREST, / BY HIS INDOMITABLE WILL, / AFTER A RUNNING FIGHT OF THREE / DAYS AND NIGHTS, WITH 410 MEN, / CAPTURED COL.A.D. STREIGHT'S / RAIDERS NUMBERING 1600 THEREBY / SAVING ROME FROM DESTRUCTION

== History ==
=== Background and creation ===
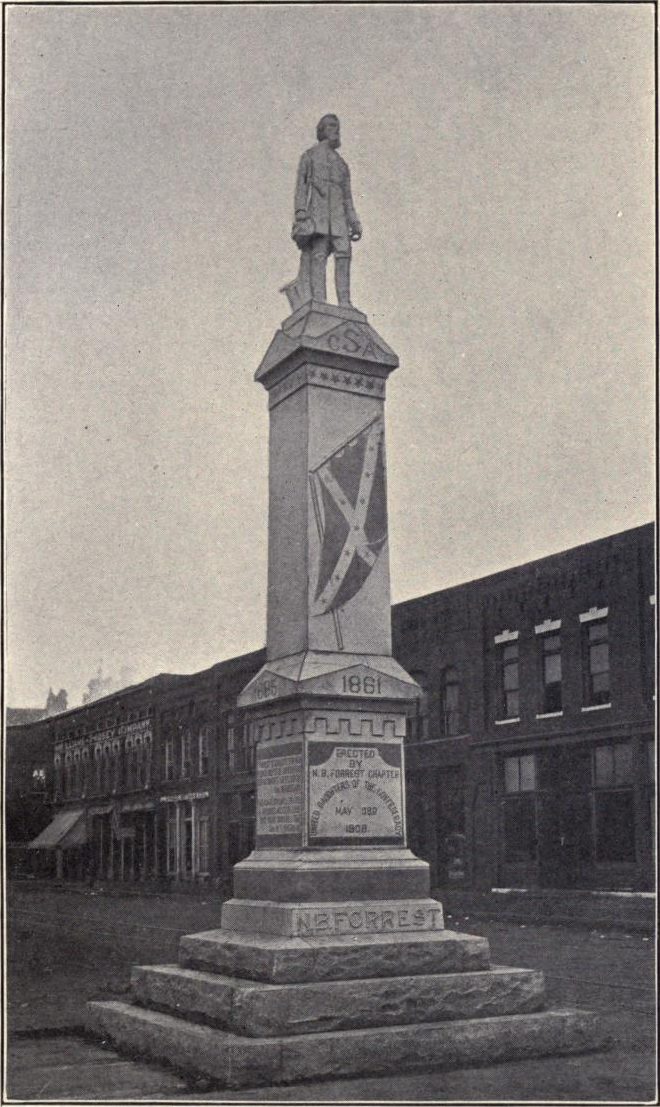
The monument in its original location on Broad Street, c. 1911

Nathan Bedford Forrest was a general in the Confederate States Army during the American Civil War. On May 3, 1863, forces under his command captured Colonel Abel Streight of the Union army. His actions against Streight, who had planned a raid across North Georgia, caused a surge in popularity for Forrest in Rome, with the Rome News-Tribune saying that he was lauded as "the savior of Rome". During the war, he was also accused of ordering a massacre of several hundred African American soldiers at Fort Pillow in Tennessee and, following the war, he served as the first grand wizard of the Ku Klux Klan.

A monument in Rome honoring Forrest was sponsored by the United Daughters of the Confederacy (UDC), with the organization's Rome branch, called the N. B. Forrest Chapter, overseeing its creation. Sculptor John Walz served as the monument's designer, while construction was performed by the McNeel Marble Works company. J. W. Wiley, a member of the company, served as a contractor for the project and oversaw its installation. It was erected in 1908 and stood in the median of Broad Street, near the intersection with Second Avenue in an area known as Rome's Cotton Block. It was dedicated on May 3 of that year. (Note: Sources vary regarding the monument's dedication. The Smithsonian Institution Research Information System states that the monument was dedicated on either May 3 or May 24, 1908. The date of May 3 is also given in several other sources. However, while multiple sources state that the monument was dedicated in 1908, a 1922 book on the history of Rome gives the dedication date as April 23, 1909.) Its creation occurred during a boom in Confederate monument construction that lasted between 1900 and 1920, amidst the Jim Crow era.

=== Later history ===
In 1910, another monument, sponsored by the Sons of Confederate Veterans in honor of women who lived in the area during the Civil War, was erected near the Forrest monument. However, beginning in 1949, there were efforts to relocate the monuments, due to traffic issues along Broad Street. In 1952, both monuments were moved to the city's Myrtle Hill Cemetery, with the Forrest monument being relocated on December 30. It was rededicated in its new location that year. By 1982, the Forrest monument was one of several Confederate monuments and memorials located at the cemetery, alongside the women's memorial (called Women of the Confederacy) and an 1887 monument dedicated to Confederate soldiers from Floyd County, Georgia. In 1993, the monument was surveyed as part of the Save Outdoor Sculpture! project. In 2002, part of the cemetery near the Forrest monument and women's memorial were incorporated into a newly developed section called Veteran's Plaza, which was centered on the Tomb of the Known Soldier. According to reporting from the News-Tribune, the two Confederate monuments were "used to ornament" the plaza.

==== Calls for removal ====
Around 2017, the United States experienced largescale protests advocating for the removal of Confederate monuments and memorials, which at the time numbered about 1,500. In September of that year, three history professors from nearby Berry College hosted a panel on Confederate monuments, including the three in Rome, that was attended by over 100 people. During the discussions, associate professor Christy Snider called the Forrest monument "the most disturbing one in Rome" given Forrest's history as both a leader of the KKK and a slave trader. In December, the Rome Confederate Monument in Myrtle Hill Cemetery was vandalized.

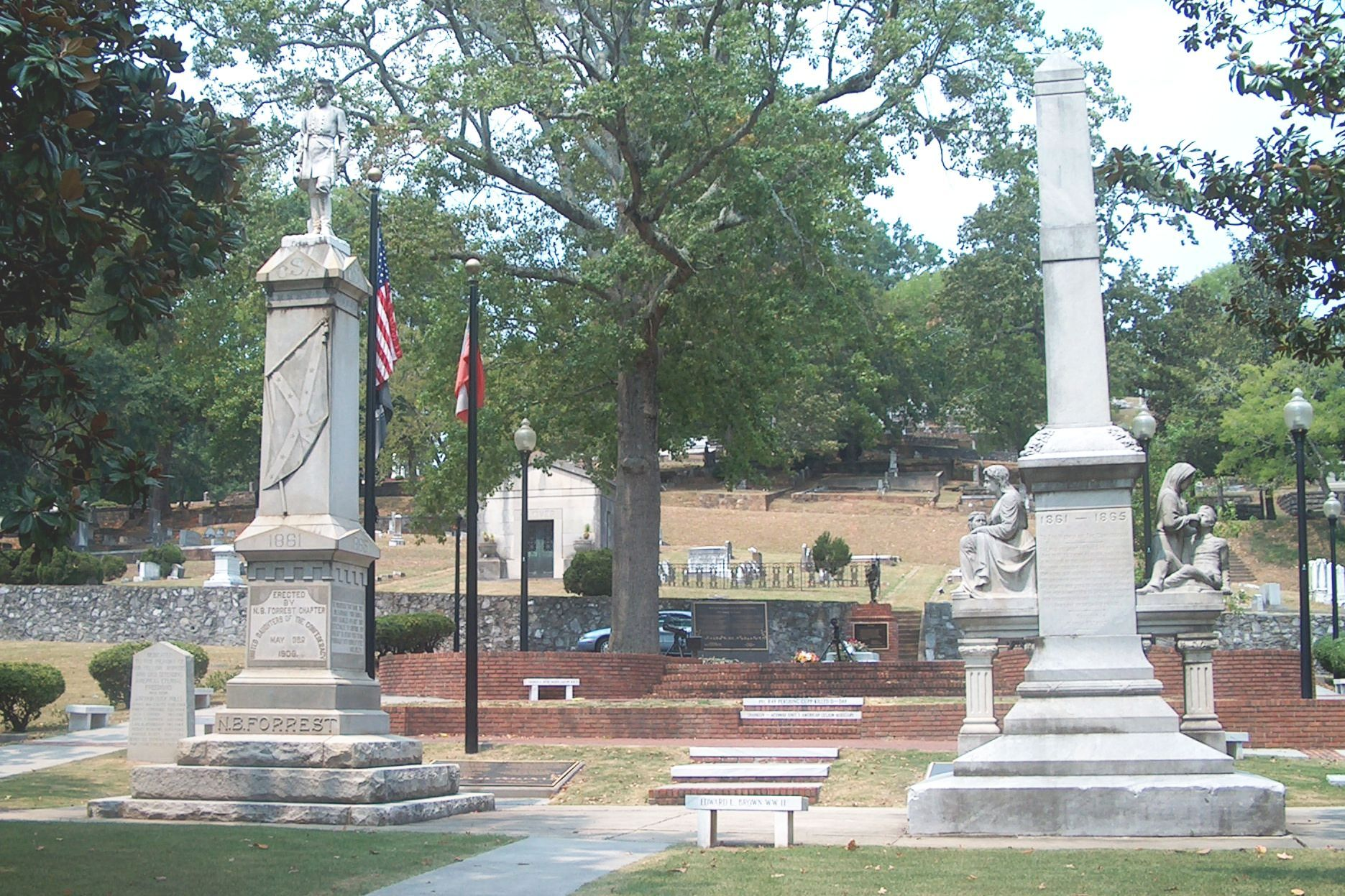
The monument (left), next to the Women of the Confederacy monument in Myrtle Hill Cemetery, pictured 2007

According to the News-Tribune, in 2001, amidst debates over the state flag (which at the time depicted a Confederate battle flag), the government of Georgia passed a law barring the removal of any Civil War monument in the state. Several years later, in 2019, Governor Brian Kemp signed a law further barring local communities in the state from removing Confederate monuments. According to the newspaper, the new law prevented the removal or relocation of monuments except to places where the monument would be of similar prominence.

In 2020, Confederate monuments came under increased criticism amidst the nationwide George Floyd protests, prompting some removals. On June 8, 2020, during a regular meeting of Rome's city commission government, two people petitioned the government to remove the statue of Forrest from Myrtle Hill Cemetery, with one of the individuals saying that it should be relocated to a battlefield. By the following day, a petition set up on Change.org requesting the statue's removal had amassed about 3,000 signatures, growing to about 4,800 by June 12. By that same time, a competing Change.org petition for the statue's continue presence at the cemetery received about 5,000 signatures. A dedicated meeting to discuss the monument was schedule by the city government to be hosted by the city's Community Development Committee. It took place on June 12 at the Rome City Auditorium, with about 100 people attending. During the event, multiple ideas were discussed, including the addition of signs to add historical context to the monument and adding additional plaques in the community to discuss the civil rights movement. Forrest's biography was largely discussed, including his KKK involvement, his activity during the Civil War, and his later life, which saw him make statements denouncing the Klan and support for civil rights for freedmen.

In late June, columnist Amy Knowles published a three-part series in the News-Tribune discussing Forrest's legacy and advocated for its removal. By the following month, the Community Development Committee announced that it was considering creating a citizens committee to review the city's Confederate monuments. On July 8, the Community Development Committee passed a unanimous motion requesting the city government to petition the state government to allow the statue to be removed from the monument and relocated to Fort Norton Park on Jackson Hill, which was the site of a Civil War embankment. Additionally, the committee recommended creating two citizens committees. One committee would be temporary and focus exclusively on interpretative signage for the Forrest monument, while the other would be permanent and focus on the city's monuments at large. Court Carney, a professor at Stephen F. Austin University and historian of Forrest, expressed interest in assisting the signage committee. On July 13, the city commission, voting unanimously, passed a resolution to relocate the monument, pursuant to reviews of the cost and logistics.

==== Statue relocation ====
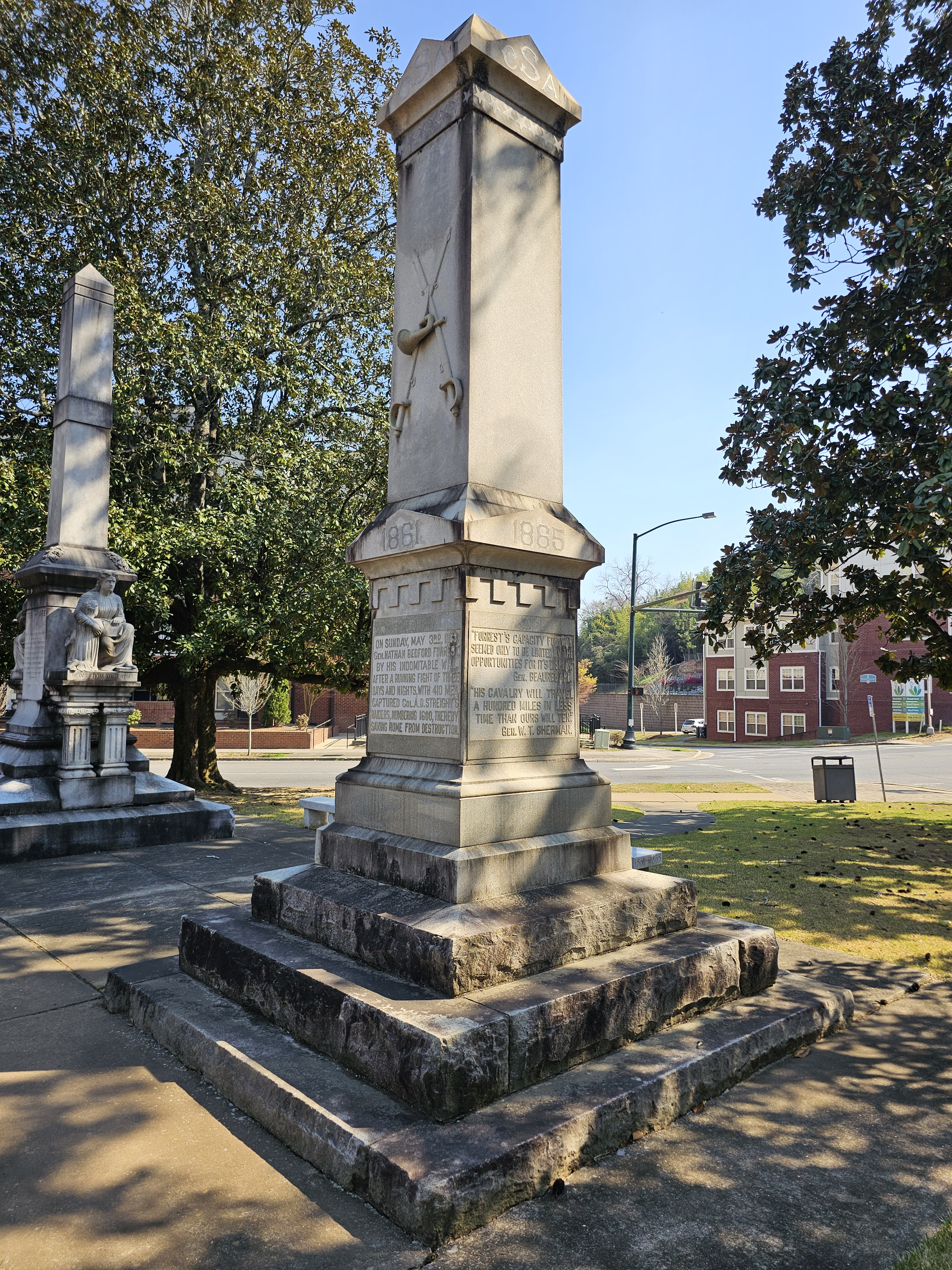
The monument in 2023, following the statue's removal

On January 29, 2021, workers removed the statue from the monument and placed it in storage. Sammy Rich, Rome's city manager, said that the removal was due in part to concerns of vandalism to the statue. The following month, the city government appointed members to the committee that would develop signage for the Forrest monument. In April, a citizens committee recommended to the city commission that the statue be placed in the Rome Area History Museum, adjacent to a Civil War exhibit where contextual information could be provided. In early August, a government committee unanimously voted to move the statue into the museum. It was installed by August.

== See also ==
- 1908 in art
- List of Confederate monuments and memorials in Georgia
- List of monuments and memorials removed during the George Floyd protests
- List of monuments erected by the United Daughters of the Confederacy
- Monuments and memorials to Nathan Bedford Forrest
