= Heinz Plank =

German painter, draughtsman and graphic artist

Heinz Plank birth_date = October 13, 1945 (age 80)
- Born: Bad Elster, Vogtlandkreis, Saxony
- Education: Hochschule für Grafik und Buchkunst Leipzig
- Known for: Painting; Drawing, Graphic Art

Heinz Plank, born 13 October 1945 in Bad Elster, Vogtlandkreis, Saxony, is a German painter, draughtsman and graphic artist. He studied under Wolfgang Mattheuer and Werner Tübke at the Hochschule für Grafik und Buchkunst Leipzig from 1967 to 1972. He is associated with the middle generation of the Leipzig School. His paintings use a mixture of traditional elements and modern abstraction. They have a recurring sense of bitterness and apocalypse.
