= John Walz =

John Walz (31 August 1844 – 27 November 1922) was a German-American sculptor most famous for his works created in Savannah, Georgia, United States.

== Early life ==
John Walz was born 31 August 1844 in Württemberg, Germany, to John and Elizabeth Walz. When Walz was thirteen or fourteen, he immigrated to the United States. His parents had died, and he went to Philadelphia to live with his married sister. There, he worked for eight years as a stonecutter, saving money to return to Europe for his education. Walz studied sculpting in Paris under the direction of Aimé Millet and in Vienna under the direction of Viktor Oskar Tilgner. In 1885, Walz returned to the United States.

== Life in Savannah ==
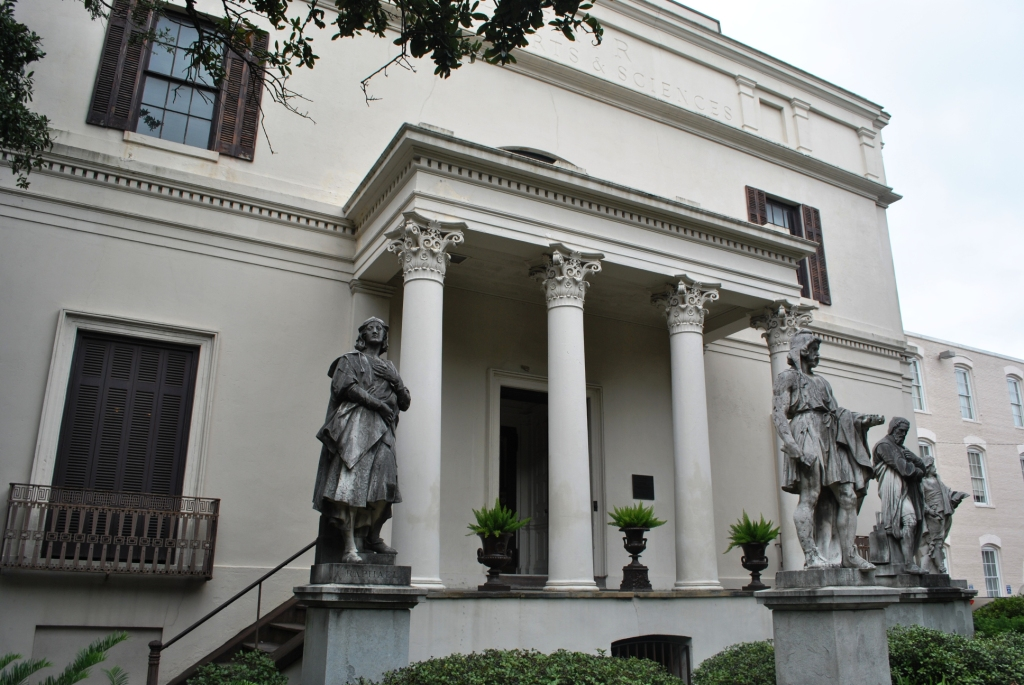
Statues commissioned for the Telfair Academy

Carl Ludwig Brandt, the director of Telfair Academy, in Savannah, Georgia, commissioned Walz's employer to create the statues that stand in front of the Academy. In 1886, Walz accompanied the statues to Savannah. He fell in love with the city, deciding to stay and open his own studio.

Walz became a popular choice for creating gravesite monuments, creating over seventy within Bonaventure Cemetery. Walz's works can also be found in Savannah's Laurel Grove Cemetery and the city's Catholic Cemetery.

== Gracie Watson ==
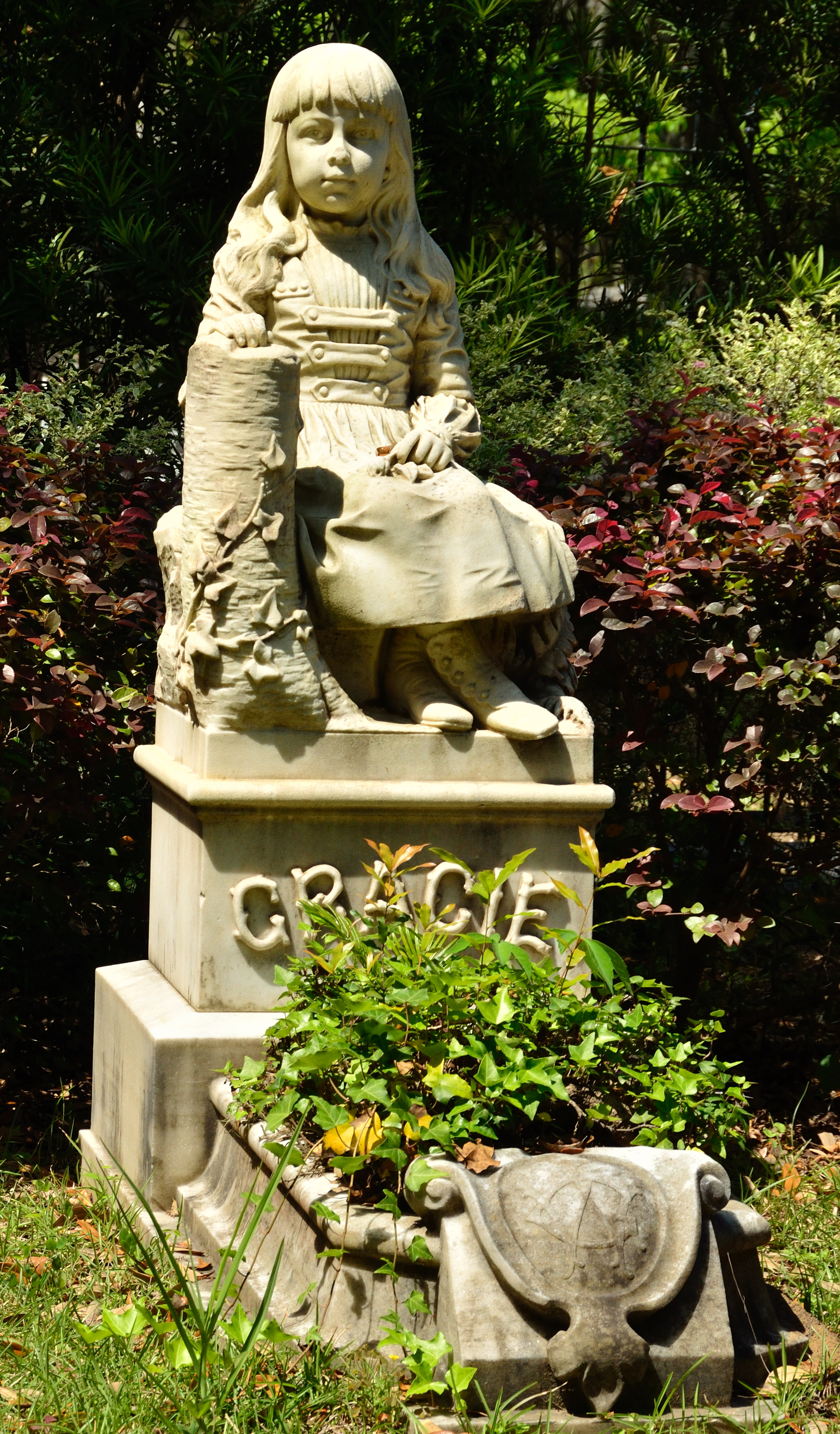
Monument of Gracie Watson, created by Walz

One of Walz's most notable works is the monument he created for Gracie Watson. Gracie Watson was the only daughter of W. J. Watson and his wife, Frances. She became ill with pneumonia and died in 1889 at age six. The year after her death, W. J. Watson took a photograph of Gracie to Walz, requesting a memorial to her. Walz sculpted a lifelike monument of a pensive Gracie lost in thought.

== Personal life ==
Walz married Sarah Gilmore in 1907 at the age of 63.

== Death ==
Walz died in 1922, and was interred at Bonaventure Cemetery. His grave was not initially marked by a memorial: a simple wooden sign indicated his grave until the Bonaventure Historical Society commissioned a monument for it.

== Legacy ==
In 2012, the Bonaventure Historical Society held a rededication ceremony for the John Walz Memorial Garden. The 4,000 ft^{2} (370 m^{2}) Memorial Garden contains a variety of over eighty plants. Bonaventure Cemetery also has a street named Walz Way in honor of him. Walz has been called a sculptor of "transcendent local importance."

== See also ==
- Nathan Bedford Forrest Monument (Rome, Georgia), a monument designed by Walz
