= Tomb of the Known Soldier =

Coordinates: 34.250452°N 85.178312°W

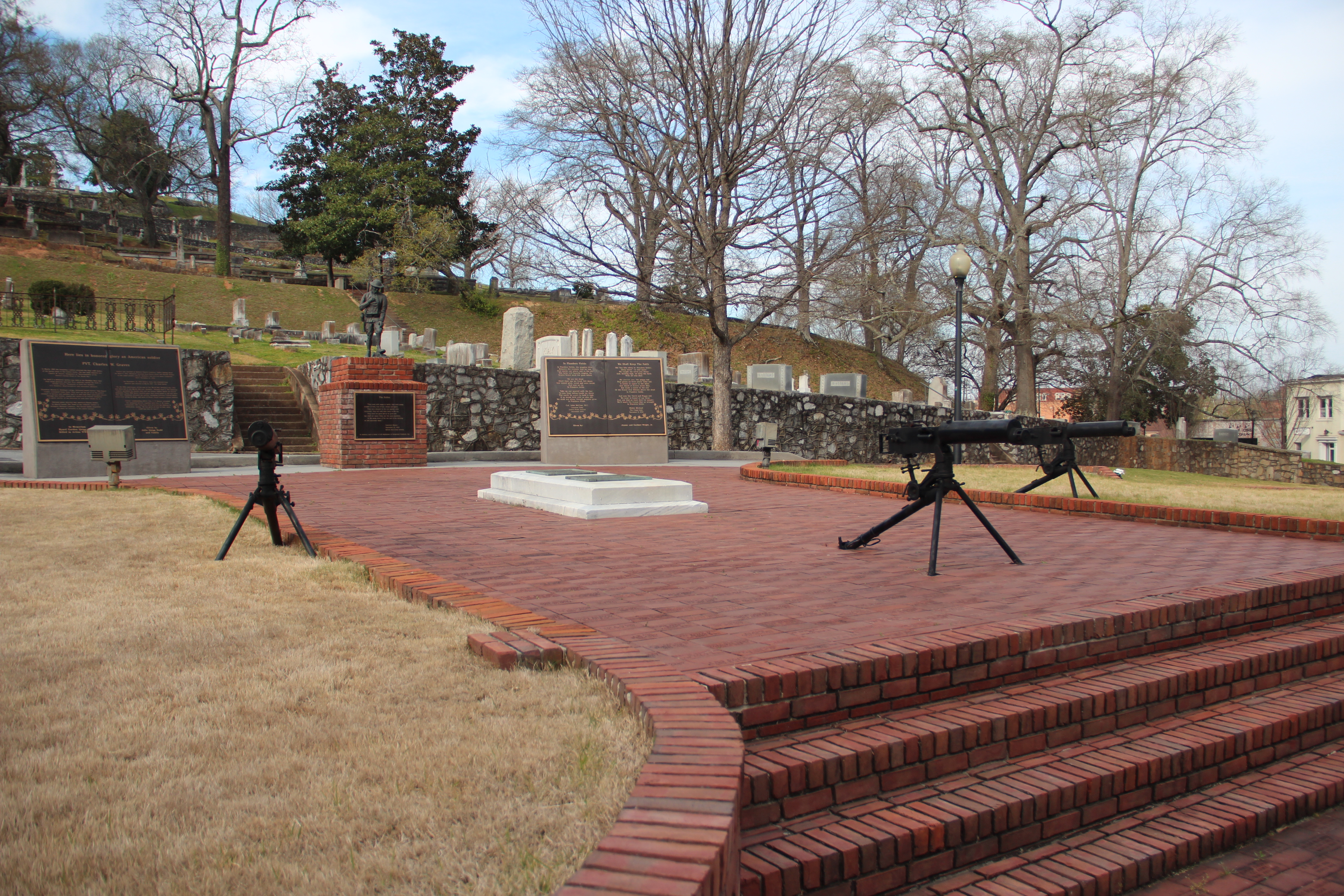
Tomb of the Known Soldier in 2018

The Tomb of the Known Soldier is a grave site in Myrtle Hill Cemetery in Rome, Georgia, United States, dedicated to a soldier killed in World War I, Private Charles Graves.

== Charles Graves ==
Charles Graves enlisted in the United States Army on August 16, 1917; he was eighteen years old at the time. He was eventually shipped to Neuroy, France. On October 5, 1918, fourteen months after his Army service began, Graves was killed by German artillery shrapnel on the Hindenburg Line. Soon after, he received full military honors and a military burial in France.

Four years after his death, Grave's mother claimed her son's body when it arrived on a troopship called the Cambria on March 29, 1922. The U.S. Government had the idea of creating the Tomb of the Unknown Soldier and of a "Known Soldier" in Arlington National Cemetery to honor World War I soldiers. Graves was chosen for "America's Known Soldier" by a blindfolded sailor who picked Graves' name from an American soldier remains list, but his mother objected to his burial at Arlington. The War Department wanted to give his body, in its flag-draped coffin, a parade on Fifth Avenue in New York with generals, admirals, and politicians before his mother buried Graves in the cemetery near Antioch Church on April 6, 1922.

== Memorial ==
Local citizens decided that Graves should be buried in a place of honor. As a result, on September 22, 1923, his body was exhumed from Antioch Cemetery and relocated to Myrtle Hill Cemetery as America's Known Soldier after his mother's death and his brother's agreement. Graves was buried a third and final time. On November 11, 1923, Armistice Day, Charles and the other 33 young men from Floyd County who died in World War I were honored with three Maxim guns and 34 magnolia trees.

Today, Graves' final resting place is known as the Tomb of the Known Soldier. To many, the memorial site is a place of remembrance, a place that is meant to pay respect to all of the known fallen soldiers of every war.

== See also ==
- Nathan Bedford Forrest Monument (Rome, Georgia) - A nearby monument located on the same plaza
