= Daisy Youngblood =

American sculptor

- Born: 1945 (age 80–81)
- Known for: Sculpture, ceramic artist
- Awards: MacArthur Fellows Program

Daisy Youngblood (born 1945) is an American modern sculptor and ceramic artist. She grew up in North Carolina and lives in New Mexico. She was a 2003 recipient of a MacArthur Fellows Program genius grant.

== Life ==
Youngblood was born in 1945 in Asheville, North Carolina. From 1963 to 1966, Youngblood attended Virginia Commonwealth University.

Youngblood's most well-known sculptural work comprises heads and torsos of people and animals made in low-fired clay, combined with found objects (sticks, teeth, hair). Some of the heads are explicitly representational portraits (such as her 1982 study of the art dealer Richard Bellamy). Youngblood has listed Jung and Buddhism as important theoretical influences, and has said that she is interested in "correlating worldwide religions and esoteric practices with the individual psyche."

In 1999, her work appeared at McKee Gallery. Her work is in the collection of the San Francisco Museum of Modern Art and the Museum of Modern Art.

== See also ==
- low-fire pottery: earthenware and terra cotta
