= Hugh Jeffery Ward =

Hugh Jeffery Ward is an American convicted criminal in the United States responsible for one of the first known thefts of computer software in 1971; he stole a $25,000 USD data plotting program from Information Systems Design of Oakland, California. Ward pleaded guilty to theft of trade secrets.
