= Edward Middleton Manigault =

Canadian American painter

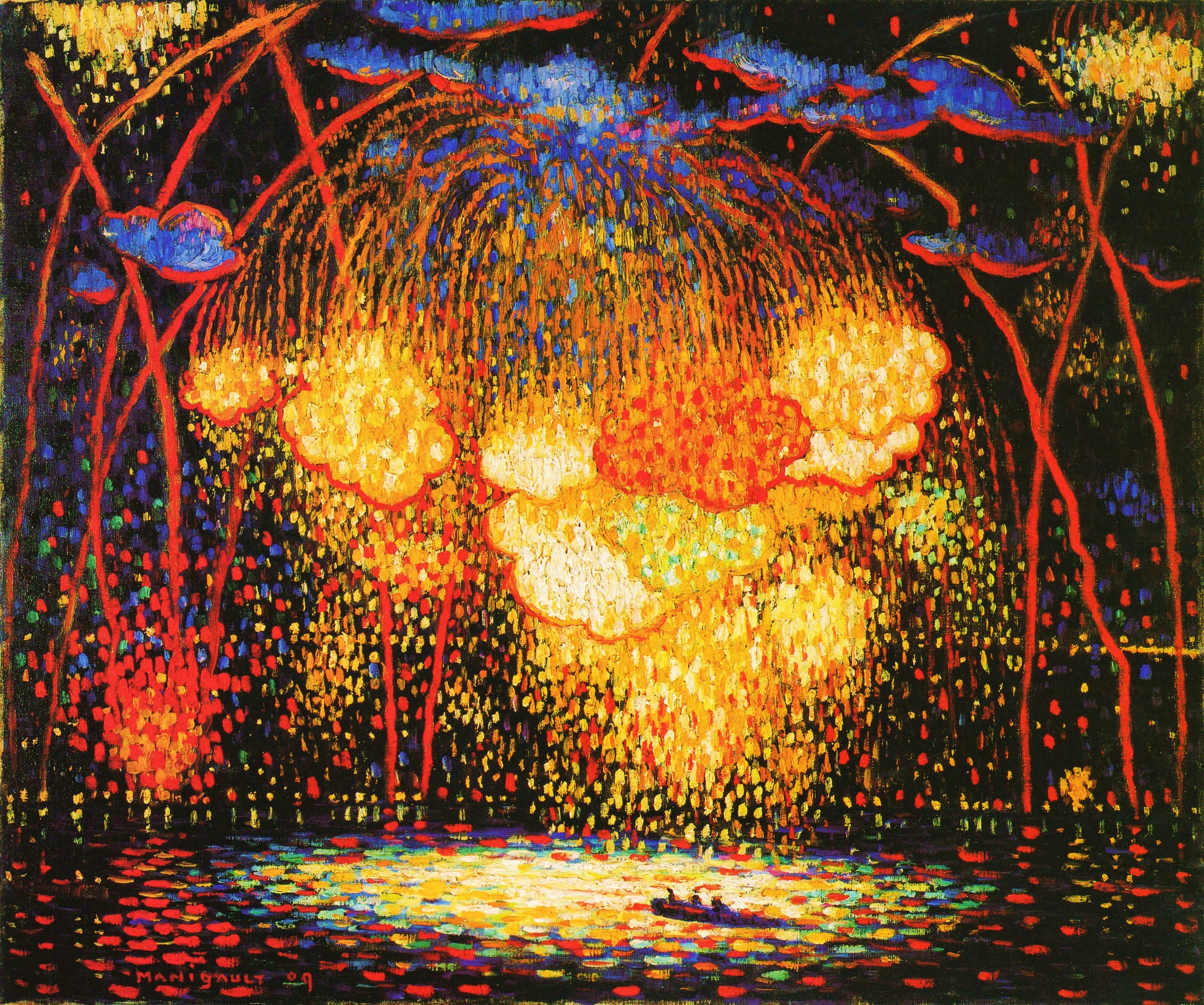
The Rocket (1909), Columbus Museum of Art.

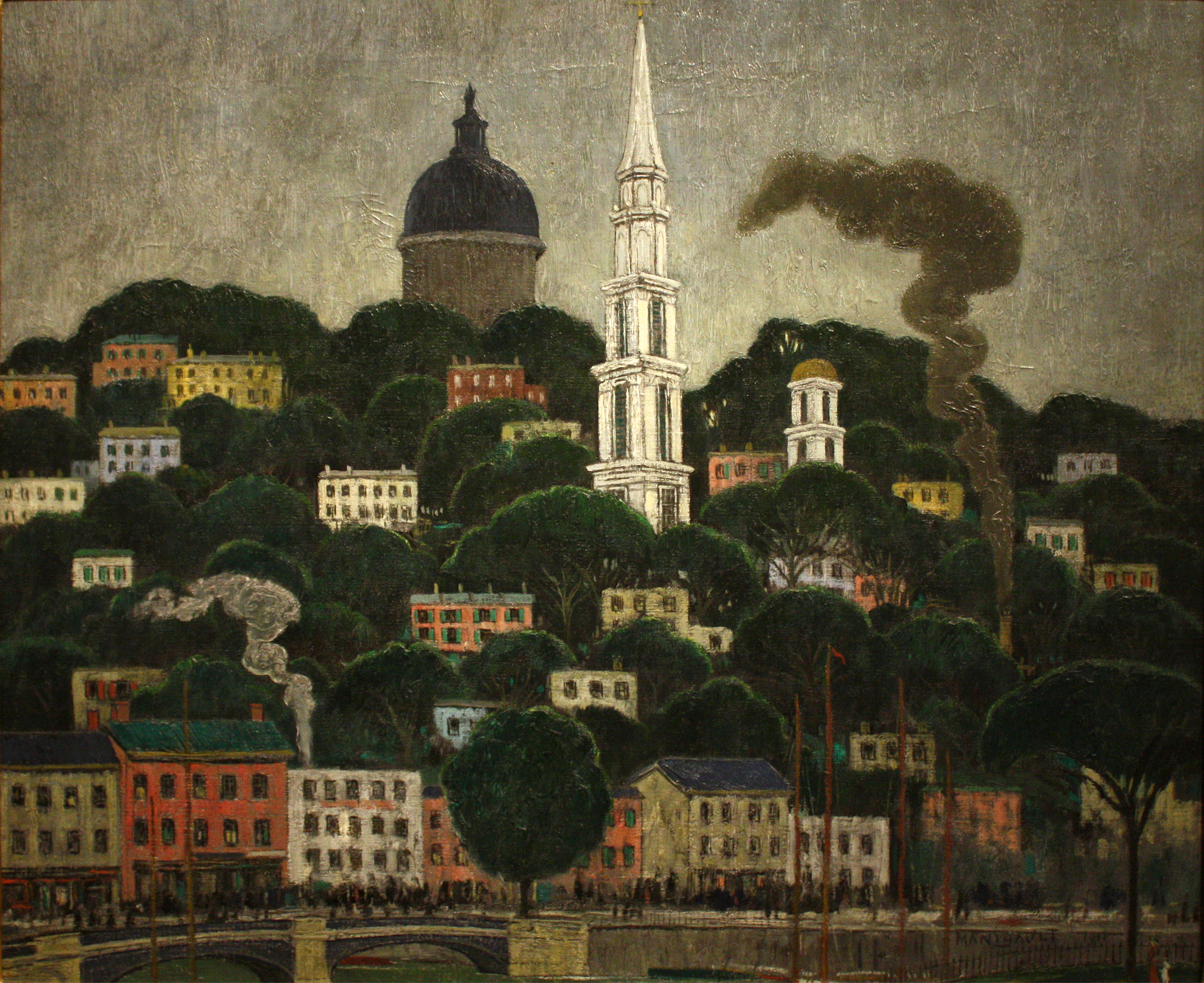
A New England Town (1911), Columbus Museum of Art.

Edward Middleton Manigault (June 14, 1887 – August 31, 1922) was a Canadian-born American Modernist painter.

== Biography ==
Manigault was born in London, Ontario, on June 14, 1887. His parents were Americans originally from South Carolina who had settled in London, Ontario after the Civil War.

Manigault was through his father Edward Middleton Manigault (b. 1847) descended from a prominent family in South Carolina, the Manigaults of Charleston, and was the grand-son of Joseph Manigault, great-grandson of Peter Manigault and the great-nephew of the architect Gabriel Manigault. Manigault´s mother was Harriet "Hattie" Wistar Barnwell (b. 1865), and was the daughter of James Ladson Barnwell, editor and publisher of "The Echo" newspaper and Eliza Harris.

Manigault also had a younger sister Anne "Nancy". Manigault´s father held a number of jobs to support his family amongst them book-keeper, accountant and for a period of time manager of the London Soap Company.

== Education ==
Encouraged in art from an early age, he was commissioned at the age of 18 by the city of London to make renderings of public buildings for reproduction as postcards (examples of his early work are in Museum London, Ontario).

Manigault moved to New York City in 1905 and enrolled in classes at the New York School of Art where he studied under Robert Henri and Kenneth Hayes Miller, alongside classmates such as Edward Hopper, George Bellows, and Rockwell Kent. By 1909, he had moved away from Realism and had begun producing paintings in a Post-Impressionism style. In that year he first exhibited his work in New York, and in 1910 he participated in the Exhibition of Independent Artists, organized by Henri. In the spring of 1912, he traveled through England and France. In 1913, his work was included in the Armory Show. In 1914, he staged a critically acclaimed one-man show at the Charles Daniel Gallery. His art was purchased by such notable collectors as J. Paul Getty and Arthur Jerome Eddy.

Despite being emotionally unstable and prone to episodes of depression, Manigault volunteered to serve as an ambulance driver with the British Expeditionary Force in 1915, displaying his spontaneity in marrying Gertrude Buffington Phillips just two days before he shipped out, whereupon he served as an ambulance driver in Flanders from April to November 1915. In November, he received a medical discharge after being exposed to mustard gas. Having suffered a nervous breakdown, he was deemed “incapacitated for service", and his health would continue to decline for the remainder of his life.

Back in the United States, he spent some time living in the utopian community of Oneida, New York.

In 1919 he and his wife resettled in the Echo Park district of Los Angeles, California. Later the same year, Manigault travelled without his wife to San Francisco and began working in a Cubist style, but, displeased with the results of this departure from his typical work, he destroyed nearly two hundred of his own paintings. At around this time in his life, Manigault had begun to practice fasting, in the hopes that starvation and meditation would allow him “to approach the spiritual plane and see colors not perceptible to the physical eye.” Ignoring the entreaties of his friends and family, in August 1922, Manigault fasted for two weeks, his health rapidly declining before he was admitted to the hospital on the 24th, where he died one week later, of starvation and neurasthenia, at the age of thirty-five.

== Style ==
Manigault worked in a wide range of styles following the war, experimenting in abstract and Cubist styles. He found these styles unsatisfying and destroyed most of his paintings. He was inspired by the example of American modernists, including William and Marguerite Zorach. Manigault subsequently became inspired by the Arts and Crafts Movement, and began to produce decorative works, including ceramics and furniture. He was also commissioned by Oneida Limited to design flatware.

== Paintings ==
Manigault is believed to have destroyed as many as two hundred of his paintings; consequently, few paintings by Manigault survive. His work notebooks cover the years from 1906 to 1919. Interest was renewed in his work in 1946, and his paintings were included in the exhibition "Pioneers of Modern Art in America 1903-1918" at the Whitney Museum of American Art that year. His work is in the permanent collections of the Columbus Museum of Art in Columbus, Ohio, the Gibbes Museum of Art in Charleston, South Carolina, the Mint Museum in Charlotte, NC, and Museum London, in Ontario, Canada

== Art ==
Edward Middleton Manigault's paintings

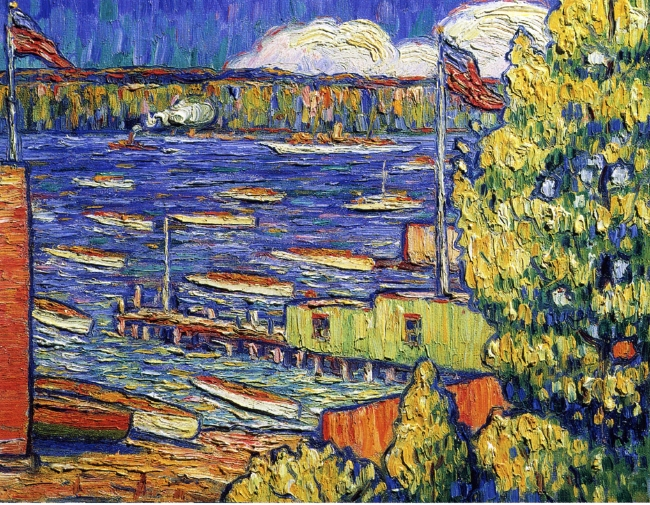
River Scene (A Flotilla on the Hudson), 1904

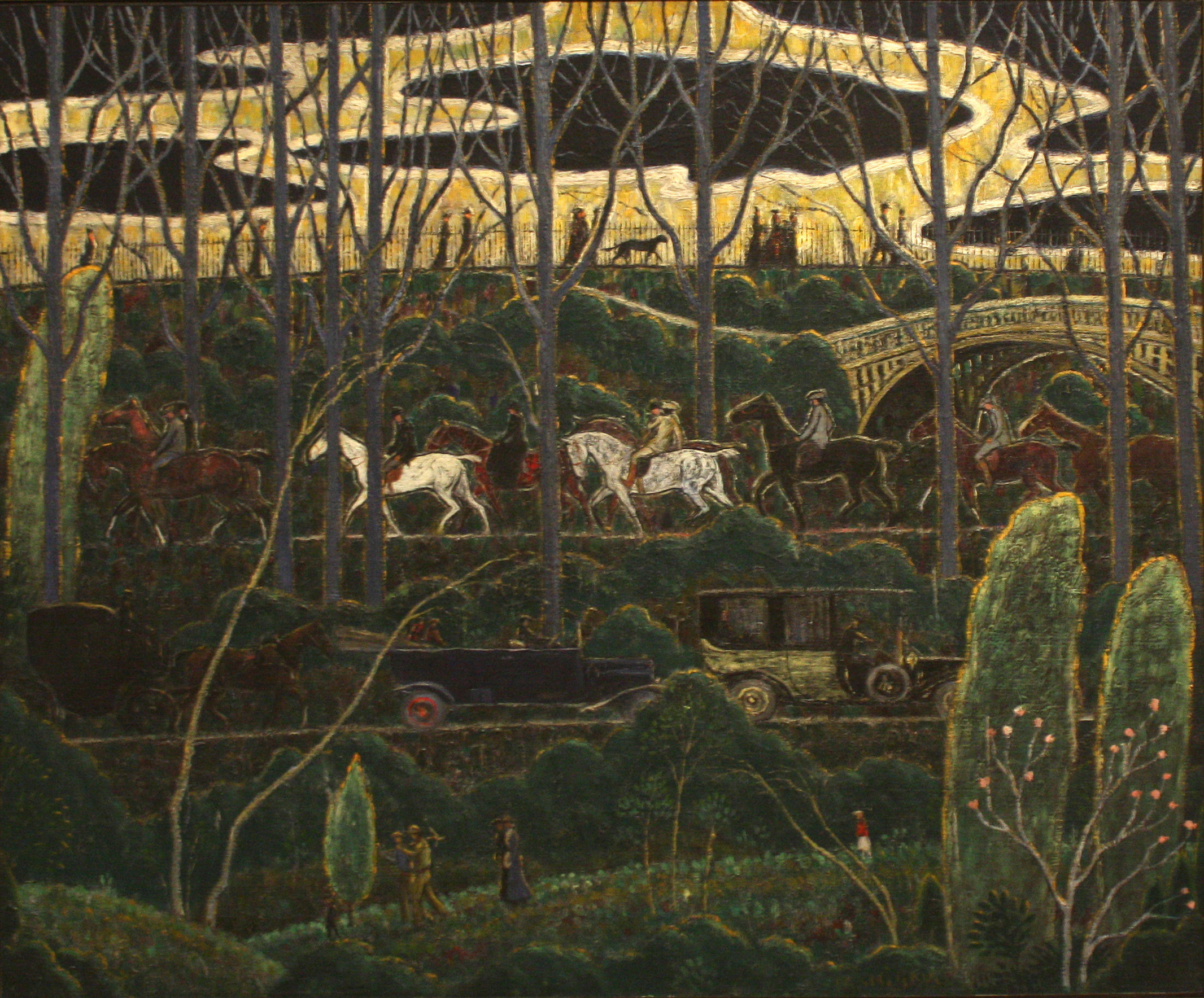
Procession (1911)

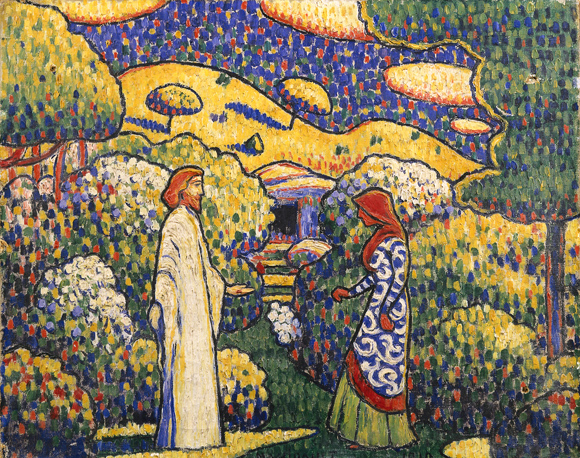
Christ Appearing to Mary (1910)

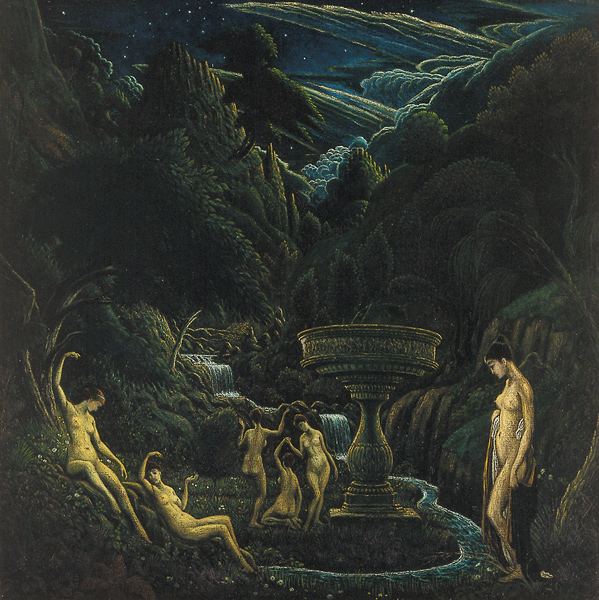
The Source (1914)

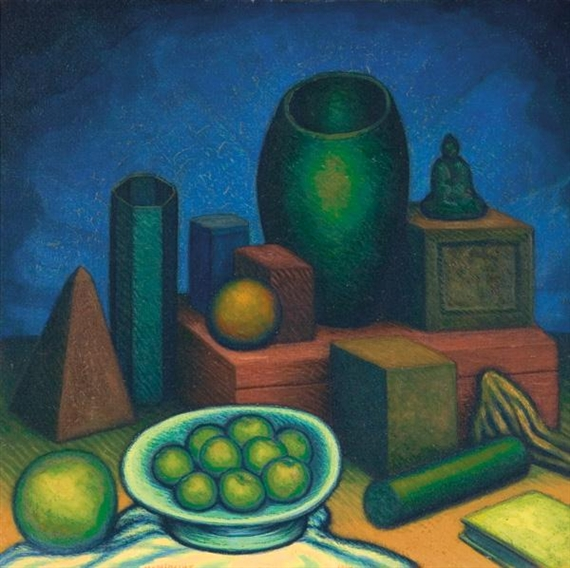
Still Life with Lemons (1916)

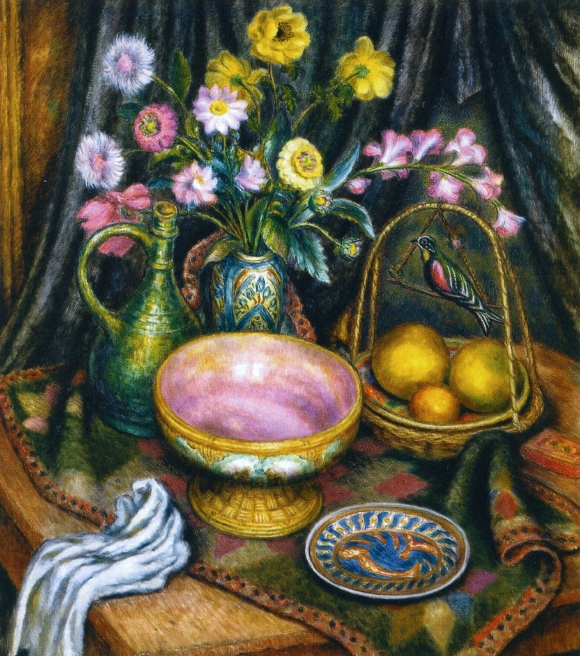
Still Life with Flowers (1918)

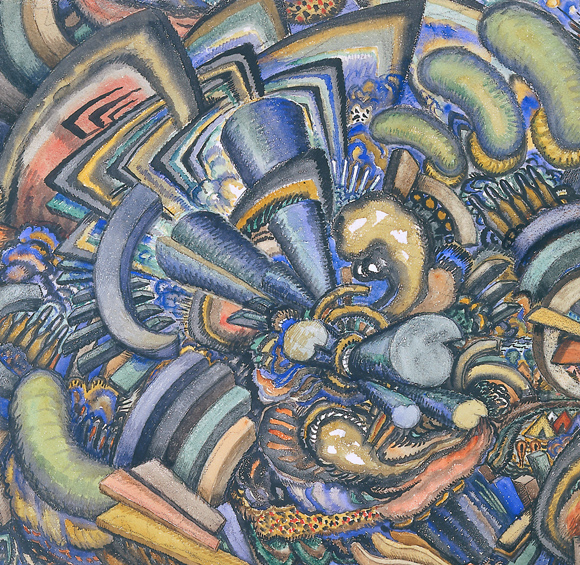
Vorticist Landscape (War Impressions) (c. 1916)
