= H. J. Ward =

American illustrator (1909–1945)

Hugh Joseph Ward (March 8, 1909 – February 7, 1945) was an American illustrator known for his cover art for pulp magazines. He is noted especially for his paintings for Spicy Mystery, Spicy Detective, and other titles published by Harry Donenfeld in the "spicy" genre. He also painted definitive images of popular radio characters the Lone Ranger and the Green Hornet.

== Early life ==
Ward was born in Philadelphia, Pennsylvania, in a working-class neighborhood. He was the youngest of eight children of Mary C. Ward and Charles A. Ward. His interest in drawing was encouraged by a high school art teacher. With the goal of becoming a commercial artist, he enrolled in a four-year diploma program at the Pennsylvania Museum School of Industrial Art in September 1927, where his teachers included Thornton Oakley. He later named N. C. Wyeth, who was guest lecturer at the school, as his most influential teacher.

The death of Ward's father in 1929 reduced his family's resources, and Ward was forced to drop out of the art program after completing only three years. In 1930 he became a graphic artist for The Philadelphia Inquirer newspaper, where he was employed to execute lettering for display advertisements. His duties at the Inquirer soon expanded to include drawing spot illustrations and political cartoons.

== Career ==
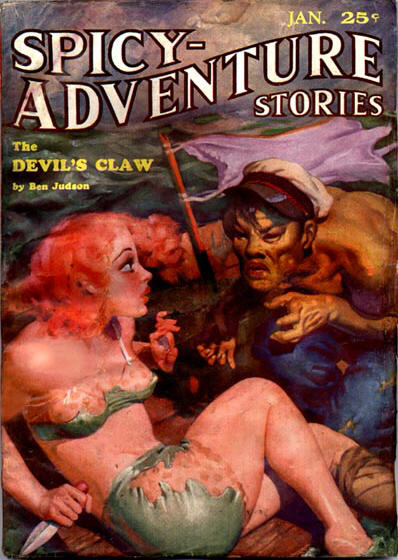
Spicy Adventure Stories, January 1935, cover by Ward

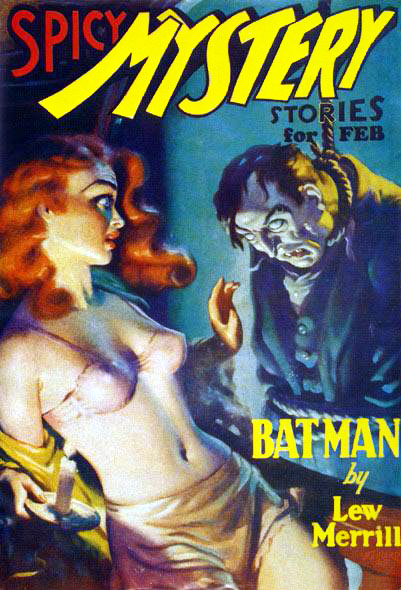
Spicy Mystery Stories, February 1936, cover by Ward

Ward's ambition was to become a free-lance illustrator for magazines. He made his first sale on August 24, 1931, to Teck Publishing Corporation, which purchased two paintings that later were used on the covers of Complete Detective Novel and Wild West Stories and Complete Novel Magazine. Subsequently, Dell Publishing asked him to provide several cover paintings for Sure-Fire Screen Stories and Ace-High Magazine.

In August 1934, Ward married Viola Conley, who became his model for all the women in his pulp magazine covers. Eschewing the use of photographs, he painted her directly from life. He became noted for his depictions of women reacting in horror to various lurid threats. Pulp historian David Saunders describes Ward as "inspired by the heartrending drama of death's cruel dominion over life's fragile and sensuous beauty".

In October 1935, Ward was able to quit his job at The Philadelphia Inquirer and devote his energies to his burgeoning career as a pulp cover artist. Most of his work was done for Harry Donenfeld's Culture Publications (later renamed Trojan Publications), publisher of Hollywood Detective, Lone Ranger, Paris Gayety, Pep, Romantic Detective, Spicy Adventure, Spicy Detective, Spicy Mystery, Spicy Western, and other titles. Ward painted an average of about 50 covers per year for Donenfeld's magazines. He also painted occasional covers for other publishers' pulps, such as Street and Smith's Sport Story and Munsey's Red Star Mystery.

In 1937 Ward was hired by George Washington Trendle to develop iconic images of the Lone Ranger and the Green Hornet radio characters to be used for merchandising. In 1940 Harry Donenfeld commissioned Ward to paint the first full-length oil painting of Superman to promote The Adventures of Superman radio program. Ward was pleased at the exposure this work afforded him beyond the world of the pulps. He aspired to the greater prestige and better pay offered by the slick magazines, but publishers showed little interest in his work, even after he finally made his first sale of a cover painting to Liberty magazine in 1939.

Ward was inducted into the US Army on April 13, 1944. In September of that year, a debilitating pain in his right shoulder was diagnosed as advanced lung cancer. He died at the age of 35 on February 7, 1945.
