= List of monuments erected by the United Daughters of the Confederacy =

This is a list of monuments erected by the United Daughters of the Confederacy, as well as by the Ladies' Memorial Association, the Sons of Confederate Veterans, and other related groups. Some of the UDC monuments feature artworks by noted sculptors.

== Alabama ==
Name	Image	Location	Designer/sculptor	Medium	Date	Comments/inscriptions
Confederate Soldier Memorial		Huntsville, Madison County Courthouse	Oscar Hummel, sculptor Georgia Marble Works, fabricator	granite	unveiled November 21, 1905	"In memory of the heroes who fell in defense of the principles which gave birth to the Confederate cause erected by the Daughters of the Confederacy. Our Confederate dead. In memory of General John Hunt Morgan, "Thunderbolt of the Confederacy, born in Huntsville June 1, 1825, died defending the noble cause Sept. 1864" In October 2021 the Confederate Soldier Memorial statue was removed from the Madison County courthouse grounds and moved to the Maple Hill Cemetery in Huntsville.
Confederate Monument		Montgomery, Alabama State Capitol	Alexander Doyle, sculptor Gorda C. Doud, designer	Russellville limestone, granite, bronze	dedicated December 7, 1898	Inscriptions: 1861-1865 / CONSECRATED TO THE MEMORY OF THE CONFEDERATE SOLDIERS AND SEAMEN; FAME'S TEMPLE BOASTS NO HIGHER NAME, / NO KING IS GRANDER ON HIS THRONE; / NO GLORY SHINES WITH BRIGHTER GLEAM, / THE NAME OF 'PATRIOT' STANDS ALONE. WHEN THIS HISTORIC SHAFT SHALL CRUMBLING LIE / IN AGES HENCE, IN WOMAN'S HEART WILL BE, / A FOLDED FLAG, A THRILLING PAGE UNROLLED, / A DEATHLESS SONG OF SOUTHERN CHIVALRY. THESE SEAMEN OF CONFEDERATE FAME / STARTED THE WONDERING WORLD; / FOR BRAVER FIGHT WAS NEVER FOUGHT, / AND FAIRER FLAG WAS NEVER FURLED. THE KNIGHTLIEST OF THE KNIGHTLY RACE / WHO SINCE THE DAYS OF OLD, / HAVE KEPT THE LAMP OF CHIVALRY / ALIGHT IN HEARTS OF GOLD. THIS CORNER STONE WAS LAID BY / JEFFERSON DAVIS. / PRESIDENT OF C.S.A. / APRIL 29, 1886.
Jefferson Davis Monument		Montgomery, Alabama State Capitol	Frederick Hibbard, sculptor Roman Bronze Works, founder	bronze, granite base	unveiled November 19, 1940	in part: JEFFERSON DAVIS, JUNE 3, 1808-DECEMBER 6, 1889, SOLDIER SCHOLAR STATESMAN, A GRADUATE OF WEST POINT MILITARY ACADEMY. HE SERVED THE UNITED STATES AS COLONEL OF MISSISSIPPI VOLUNTEERS. MEXICAN WAR: MEMBER OF HOUSE OF REPRESENTATIVES, SENATOR, AND AS SECRETARY OF WAR. INAUGURATED PRESIDENT OF THE PROVISIONAL GOVERNMENT, CONFEDERATE STATES OF AMERICA, FEBRUARY 18, 1861. PRESENTED TO THE STATE OF ALABAMA BY THE/UNITED DAUGHTERS OF THE CONFEDERACY NOVEMBER 19, 1940

== Arkansas ==
Name	Image	Location	Designer/sculptor	Medium	Date	Comments/inscriptions
Confederate Memorial		Fort Smith, Sebastian County Courthouse	Monumental Cut Stone Company, fabricator	granite	dedicated September 10, 1903	"LEST WE FORGET / 1861-1865 / OUR CONFEDERATE DEAD / ERECTED / BY THE / VARINA JEFFERSON DAVIS / CHAPTER, DAUGHTERS / OF CONFEDERACY / FORT SMITH, ARK. / 1903."
Pine Bluff Confederate Monument aka David Owen Dodd Statue		Pine Bluff, Jefferson County Courthouse	McNeel Marble Works, fabricator	Georgia marble	November 10, 1910	in part: TO THE MEMORY OF / OUR CONFEDERATE / SOLDIERS. / WE CARE NOT WHENCE THEY CAME, / DEAR IN THEIR LIFELESS CLAY. /WHETHER KNOWN OR UNKNOWN / TO FAME / THEIR CAUSE AND COUNTRY / STILL THE SAME. / THEY DIED AND WORE THE GREY. / THIS TABLET IS INSCRIBED TO/ J. ED MURRAY COLONEL / OF THE 5TH ARKANSAS REGIMENT. / KILLED AT THE BATTLE OF ATLANTA. / JULY 22, 1864 / AGE 21 YEARS. 1861 - 1865 / CONFEDERATE. ERECTED BY THE DAVID OWEN DODD CHAPTER. / UNITED DAUGHTERS / OF THE CONFEDERACY. / NOV 10, 1910 / IN LEGEND AND LAY / OUR HEROS (sic) IN GRAY / SHALL FOREVER LIVE OVER / AGAIN FOR US. A TRIBUTE TO DAVID OWEN DODD / OUR MARTYR HERO / HANGED AT LITTLE ROCK / AS A SPY JAN. 8, 1864 / AGED 17 YEARS / HE WAS OFFERED LIFE AND / LIBERTY BUT PREFERRED TO / DIE RATHER THAN PROVE / FALSE TO HIS TRUST:
Bentonville Confederate Monument		Bentonville, Public Square Park	Unknown, from Barre, Vermont	Granite	August 8, 1908	North face inscription: "THEIR NAMES ARE BORNE ON HONOR'S SHIELD / THEIR RECORD IS WITH GOD / CONFEDERATE." East face inscription: " THEY FOUGHT FOR HOME AND FATHERLAND / CONFEDERATE." South face inscription: "1861-65 / CONFEDERATE." West face inscription: "TO THE SOUTHERN SOLDIERS / ERECTED BY A.J. BATES AND / THE JAMES H. BERRY CHAPTER / UNITED DAUGHTERS OF THE CONFEDERACY / AUG. 8, 1908. / CONFEDERATE." Metal plate added to west face on January 30, 1914: "JAMES H. BERRY / 1841-1913 / SOLDIER AND STATESMAN / BELOVED OF ARKANSAS / 2ND LIEUTENANT / CO. E 16TH ARK. INFANTRY, C.S.A / LEGISLATOR - JURIST / GOVERNOR OF ARKANSAS / UNITED STATES SENATOR / HE PERFORMED EVERY DUTY / WITH AN EYE / SINGLE TO THE PUBLIC WELFARE / AND HIS OWN UNBLEMISHED HONOR / THIS TABLE IS PLACED HERE / BY THE JAMES H. BERRY CHAPTER / UNITED DAUGHTERS OF / THE CONFEDERACY / THE PAT CLEBURNE CAMP / SONS OF CONFEDERATE VETERANS / AND OTHER FRIENDS / IN LOVING REMEMBRANCE / AND APPRECIATION / OF HIS NOBLE LIFE AND CHARACTER."

== Florida ==
Name	Image	Location	Designer/sculptor	Medium	Date	Comments/inscriptions
Florida's Tribute to the Women of the Confederacy		Jacksonville, Springfield Park	Allen George Newman, sculptor Jno. Williams Inc., founder McNeel Marble Works, fabricator	bronze granite	dedicated October 26, 1915	Inscription: IN MEMORY OF THE / WOMEN OF OUR SOUTHLAND / 1861 - 1865 / LET THIS MUTE BUT ELOQUENT / STRUCTURE SPEAK TO GENERATIONS / TO COME, OF A GENERATION OF / THE PAST. LET IT REPEAT / PERPETUALLY THE IMPERISHABLE / STORY OF OUR WOMEN OF THE 60'S. / THOSE NOBLE WOMEN WHO / SACRIFICED THEIR ALL / UPON THEIR COUNTRY'S ALTAR. / UNTO THEIR MEMORY THE FLORIDA DIVISION / OF UNITED CONFEDERATE VETERANS / AFFECTIONATELY DEDICATE THIS MONUMENT.
Confederate Monument		Lakeland, Munn Park	McNeel Marble Works, fabricator	stone	June 3, 1910	in part: CONFEDERATE / DEAD: THIS MONUMENT WAS ERECTED / BY THE LAKELAND CHAPTER, / UNITED DAUGHTERS / OF THE CONFEDERACY / IN MEMORY OF THE NOBLE / SONS OF THE SOUTH. / A.D. 1910. IN MEMORY OF THAT NOBLE BAND / WHO HAVE CROSSED THE MYSTIC / STREAM, / AND ARE RESTING NOW IN THAT / HAPPY LAND, / WHERE PEACE AND PLEASURE / REIGN SUPREME. / THE HEROIC DEEDS WILL NEVER/FADE, / FROM MEMORY'S BRIGHTEST PAGE, / AND THEIR BRAVE DEFENSE OF / COUNTRY AND HOME, / IS LEFT AS A GLORIOUS HERITAGE
Johnny Reb		Ocala, Old Marion County Courthouse	McNeel Marble Works, fabricator	Italian marble, granite	April 25, 1905	in part: THE SOUTH REVERES / HER WASHINGTON / JEFFERSON, MADISON / MONROE, ANDREW JACKSON / AND OTHERS WHO LAID / THE FOUNDATIONS OF / OUR GRAND REPUBLIC / SHE HONORS HER LEE /STONEWALL JACKSON / STUART, JOHNSON, FOREST / AND EVERY BRAVE SON / WHO FOUGHT TO PRESERVE / OUR LIBERTIES, / GUARANTEED BY THE FATHERS / UNDER THE CONSTITUTION. / ERECTED A.D. 1908 / BY/DICKISON CHAPTER NO.56, U.D.C. / IN HONOR OF / THE HEROES OF THE / CONFEDERACY CSA / IT'S FAME ON /BRIGHTEST PAGES, / PENNED BY POETS AND BY SAGES, / SHALL GO SOUNDING / DOWN THE AGES

== Georgia ==
Name	Image	Location	Designer/sculptor	Medium	Date	Comments/inscriptions
Wilcox County Confederate Monument		Abbeville, Wilcox County Library	McNeel Marble Works, fabricator	Georgia marble	April 26, 1909	in part: "CONFEDERATE / DEAD / CONFEDERATE" "THIS CARVEN STONE IS / HERE TO TELL / TO ALL THE WORLD THE / LOVE WE BEAR / TO THOSE WHO FOUGHT AND / BLED AND FELL, / WHOSE BATTLE CRY WAS / DO AND DARE. / WHO FEARED NO FOE, BUT/FACED THE FRAY— /OUR GALLANT MEN WHO WORE THE GRAY." "ERECTED BY THE / ABBEVILLE CHAPTER, / UNITED DAUGHTERS OF / THE CONFEDERACY, /APRIL 26, 1909. / IN MEMORY OF OUR / HEROES IN GRAY." "IT IS A DUTY WE OWE / TO POSTERITY TO SEE / THAT OUR CHILDREN SHALL / KNOW THE VIRTUES AND / BECOME WORTHY OF THEIR / SIRES."
DeKalb County Confederate Monument		Decatur, Old Courthouse (removed in 2020)			1908	(South Face): Erected by the men and women and children of Dekalb County, to the memory of the soldiers and sailors of the Confederacy, of whose virtues in peace and in war we are witnesses, to the end that justice may be done and that the truth perish not. (West Face): After forty two years another generation bears witness to the future that these men were of a covenant keeping race who held fast to the faith as it was given by the fathers of the Republic. Modest in prosperity, gentile in peace, brave in battle, and undespairing in defeat, they knew no law of life but loyalty and truth and civic faith, and to these virtues they consecrated their strength. (North Face): These men held that the states made the union, that the Constitution is the evidence of the covenant, that the people of the State are subject to no power except as they have agreed, that free convention binds the parties to it, that there is sanctity in oaths and obligations in contracts, and in defense of these principles they mutually pledged their live, their fortunes, and their sacred honor. (East Face) How well they kept the faith is faintly written in the records of the armies and the history of the times. We who knew them testify that as their courage was without a precedent their fortitude has been without a parallel. May their prosperity be worthy.
Indian War Cannon		Decatur, Old Courthouse (removed in 2021)			April 26, 1906	Relic of the Indian War of 1836. Mounted by Agnes Lee Chapter U.D.C. No 434. Apr. 26. 1906.
Nathan Bedford Forrest Monument		Rome, Myrtle Hill Cemetery	John Walz McNeel Marble Works	Carrara marble, granite	May 3, 1908	in part: "HE POSSESSED THAT RARE TACT, UNLARNABLE FROM BOOKS, WHICH ENABLED HIM, NOT ONLY EFFECTUALLY, TO CONTROL HIS MEN, BUT TO ATTACH THEM TO HIM, PERSONALLY, “WITH HOOKS OF STEEL” WOLSELEY. ON SUNDAY. MAY 3RD, 1863, GEN. NATHAN BEDFORD FORREST, BY HIS INDOMITABLE WILL, AFTER A RUNNING FIGHT OF THREE DAYS AND NIGHTS, WITH 410 MEN, CAPTURED COL. A.D. STREIGHT’S RAIDERS, NUMBERING 1600, THEREBY SAVING ROME FROM DESTRUCTION. “FORREST’S CAPACITY FOR WAR SEEMED ONLY TO BE LIMITED BY THE OPPORTUNITIES FOR IT’S DISPLAY.” GEN. BEAUREGARD. “HIS CAVALRY WILL TRAVEL A HUNDRED MILES IN LESS TIME THAN OURS WILL TEN” GEN. W.T. SHERMAN."
Franklin County Confederate Monument		Carnesville, Franklin County Courthouse	McNeel Marble Works	Marble, granite base	August 10, 1910	'in part: "THIS, WE RAISE / A LOVING TRIBUTE, / TO THE PAST, PRESENT / AND FUTURE." IN MEMORY OF / THE / FRANKLIN COUNTY / VETERANS / FROM THE / MILLICAN CHAPTER / U.D.C. / AUG. 10, 1910 / 1861-1865 / TO OUR / CONFEDERATE / SOLDIERS
Carroll County Confederate Monument		Carrollton, Carroll County Courthouse	McNeel Marble Works	Marble	September 26, 1910	'in part: "In Proud and Loving Memory Of the / Confederate / soldiers / of Carroll County / 1861-1865 Confederate/Dead, Erected/by the / Annie Wheeler Chapter / United Daughters, "How sleep the Brave, / who sink to Rest, / By All Their Country's / Wishes Blest! / By Forms unseen, their / Dirge is Sung, / There Honor Comes, / A/Pilgrim Gray. To Bless the Turf, / That wraps their Clay." Upon the Altar / of Home and Country They Placed the Offering / In Fullest Measure / Of all they had to give.
Bartow County Confederate Monument		Cartersville, Bartow County Courthouse	McNeel Marble Works	Sandstone, granite base	April 26, 1878	'in part: "ERECTED BY / THE DAUGHTERS OF / THE CONFEDERACY. / IN HONOR OF THE MEN, / OF BARTOW COUNTY, / WHO SERVED IN THE ARMY/OF THE CONFEDERATE / STATES OF AMERICA. / THOSE WHO FOUGHT AND LIVED, / AND THOSE WHO FOUGHT AND DIED. /MAY THIS SHAFT EVER CALL TO / MEMORY, THE STORY OF THE GLORY / OF THE MEN WHO WORE THE GRAY. / LET THE STRANGER WHO MAY IN / FUTURE TIME READ THIS INSCRIPTION, / AND RECOGNIZE THAT THERE WERE MEN, / WHOM POWER COULD NOT CORRUPT, / DEATH COULD NOT TERRIFY, / DEFEAT COULD NOT DISHONOR; / LET THESE VIRTUES PLEAD FOR / JUST JUDGEMENT IN THE CAUSE / -FOR WHICH THEY PERISHED.- / LET GEORGIA, REMEMBER THAT THE / STATE TAUGHT THEM HOW TO LIVE / AND HOW TO DIE; AND THAT FROM HER / BROKEN FORTUNES, SHE HAS PRESERVED / FOR HER CHILDREN, THE PRICELESS / TREASURE OF HER MEMORIES, TEACHING / ALL WHO MAY CLAIM THE SAME /BIRTH-RIGHT, THAT TRUTH, VIRTUE AND / PATRIOTISM ENDURE FOREVER.
Polk County Confederate Monument aka Our Heroes		Cedartown, Polk County Courthouse	McNeel Marble Works	Marble, granite base	October 26, 1906	in part: "ERECTED BY THE / CEDARTOWN CHAPTER / U.D.C. NO. 491. / TO THE CONFEDERATE / VETERANS OF POLK COUNTY / 1906. /THE DAUGHTERS OF / THOSE WHO MADE / OUR FLAG HOLD IN /EXHALTED VENERATION / THOSE WHO BORE IT. / OUR HEROES / THIS, WE RAISE, A / LOVING TRIBUTE TO / THE PAST, PRESENT / AND FUTURE. / THE PRINCIPLES FOR / WHICH THEY FOUGHT / LIVE ETERNALLY. / WHEN THE LAST / TRUMPET SOUNDED / MAY EACH ONE ANSWER / THE ROLL CALL OF / THE HEAVENLY ARMY.
Muscogee County Confederate Monument		Columbus, Salisbury Park	Thomas J. Grier, sculptor	marble	May 6, 1879	in part: NO TRUTH IS LOST FOR WHICH THE TRUE ARE WEEPING NOR DEAD FOR WHICH THEY DIED." "GATHER THE SACRED DUST, OF WARRIORS TRIED AND TRUE, WHO BORE THE FLAG OF OUR NATIONS TRUST, AND FELL IN THE CAUSE THO' LOST, STILL JUST AND DIED FOR ME AND YOU." "THEIR GLORY SHALL NOT BE FORGOTTEN ERECTED BY THE LADIES OF THE MEMORIAL/ASSOCIATION MAY 1879. TO HONOR THE CONFEDERATE SOLDIERS WHO DIED TO REPEL UNCONSTITUTIONAL INVASION TO PROTECT THE RIGHT RESERVED TO THE PEOPLE AND TO PERPETUATE FOREVER THE SOVEREIGNTY OF THE STATES." Erected by the Ladies Memorial Association of Muscogee County.
Crisp County Confederate Monument		Cordele, Corner of 16th Avenue & 7th Street	Consolidated Marble Company, fabricator	granite	dedicated April 26, 1911	in part: "He sprang into battle-line to defend his invaded country. he won marvelous victories; he suffered no discreditable defeats; he never abused a triumph, and never lost fortitude in the hour of disaster; Erected by Cordele Chapter No. 173 U.D.C. 1911 Amid the Confederate lights and shadows cast upon the historic canvas, we trace no semblance of dishonor, to suggestion of thought or act unworthy of the loftiest aspiration and the bravest endeavor."
Joseph E. Johnston Monument		Dalton, Hamilton Street	Belle Kinney, sculptor Southern Granite and Marble, fabricator	bronze, Georgia granite base	dedicated October 24, 1912	in part: "Erected by Bryan M. Thomas Chapter, United Daughters of the Confederacy, Dalton, Georgia, 1912."
Laurens County Confederate Monument		Dublin, Dublin Carnegie Library, Bellevue & Academy Avenues	Cordele Marble Company, fabricator	marble	dedicated April 26, 1912	in part: "Your sons and daughters will forever guard the memory of your brave deeds. It has no speech nor language within its folds, the dead who died under it, lie fitly shrouded. Fidelity, when extended to him to who it is justly due Resembles the "stars of Friedland" that shines the best in the blackest night"
Confederate Monument of Eastman, Dodge County		Eastman, Dodge County Courthouse	McNeel Marble Works	Marble, granite base	April 26, 1910	'in part: "ERECTED BY THE / FANNIE GORDON CHAPTER / UNITED DAUGHTERS / OF THE CONFEDERACY / APRIL 1910 / "NO NATION ROSE SO PURE / AND WHITE / NONE EVER FELL SO SPOTLESS. "TO OUR CONFEDERATE / SOLDIERS/1861 - 1865 / "THE PRINCIPLES FOR WHICH / THEY FOUGHT CAN NEVER DIE" / CONFEDERATE/DEAD "TO THOSE WHO FOUGHT / AND LIVED / TO THOSE WHO FOUGHT / AND DIED" / THIS STONE IS ERECTED / TO KEEP FRESH IN MEMORY / THE NOBLE DEEDS OF / THESE DEVOTED SONS. NO BRAVER SOLDIERS /NO TRUER PATRIOTS EVER / ADORNED THE HISTORY OF / ANY NATION, THEY HAVE / WON THEIR TITLE TO / IMMORTALITY OF LOVE / AND REVERENCE. / "NOR SHALL YOUR GLORY / BE FORGOT, / WHITE FAME HER RECORD KEEPS."
Eatonton Confederate Monument		Eatonton, Putnam County Courthouse	McNeel Marble Works	Marble, granite base	Dedicated July 22, 1908	'in part: "A TRIBUTE OF LOVE / FROM THE DIXIE CHAPTER /DAUGHTERS OF / THE CONFEDERACY / — / IN HONOR OF THE MEN /OF PUTNAM COUNTY, / WHO SERVED IN THE ARMY / OF THE CONFEDERATE STATES / OF AMERICA; / "THOSE WHO FOUGHT / AND LIVED AND THOSE / WHO FOUGHT AND DIED." "WHEN MARBLE WEARS AWAY, AND MONUMENTS ARE DUST, THE SONGS THAT GUARD / OUR SOLDIER'S CLAY WILL STILL FULFILL THEIR TRUST."
Elbert County Confederate Memorial		Elberton, Sutton Square	Arthur Beter, sculptor Monumental Bronze Company, founder Elberton Granite and Marble Works, fabricator	bronze, Elberton granite	dedicated July 15, 1898	"ELBERT COUNTY / TO HER / CONFEDERATE DEAD"
Confederate Soldier Monument		Forsyth, Monroe County Courthouse	Frederick Hibbard, sculptor American Bronze Company, founder	bronze, granite base	June 29, 1908	in part: CONFEDERATE, CONSTITUTION JUSTICE WISDOM MODERATION: Also includes list of units
Hall County Confederate Monument		Gainesville, Public Square	Henry Allen, designer American Bronze Company, founder	bronze	dedicated June 7, 1909	
Hawkinsville Confederate Monument		Hawkinsville, Pulaski County Courthouse	McNeel Marble Works	Marble, granite base	July 31, 1908	'in part: "TO OUR / CONFEDERATE / SOLDIERS" (Below Lee figure:) R.E. LEE (Below Jackson figure:) T.J. Jackson "ERECTED BY THE / DAUGHTERS OF THE CONFEDERACY / MRS. G.W.JORDAN, PRES. /MRS. P.H. LOVEJOY, SEC. & TREAS. / LAID BY THE M.W.G.L OF GA. /A.F. & A.M. / 1907
Confederate Soldiers Monument		Hartwell, Hart County Courthouse	McNeel Marble Works	Marble, granite base	July 23, 1908	'in part: "IN LOVING MEMORY / OF OUR HART COUNTY / SOLDIERS
Jackson County Confederate Monument		Jefferson, Town Square	McNeel Marble Works	Granite	April 26, 1911	'in part: "SOUTHERN / CROSS / OF / HONOR" " DEO / VENDICI /1861 / 1865" " COMRADES / "TO OUR / CONFEDERATE SOLDIERS", "LEST WE FORGET / ERECTED BY / U.D.C. CHAPTER 217, / JEFFERSON, GA. 1911"; The statue was accidentally badly damaged and removed in 1940 at which time a cross was placed atop the monument.
Bibb County Confederate Memorial		Macon, Cotton Avenue & 2nd Street (formerly located beside the county courthouse)	Muldoon Monument Company, fabricator Artope & Whitt, contractor	Carrara marble, Stone Mountain granite	dedicated October 29, 1879 relocated April 18, 1956	"ERECTED A.D. 1879 / By the / Ladies' Memorial Association of Macon / In HONOR of / The Men of Bibb County / And all who gave their lives to the / South to establish the / Independence of the / CONFEDERATE STATES / 1861-1865 / With pride in their Patriotism / With Love for their memory / This silent stone is raised / A perpetual witness of our Gratitude."
Jenkins County Confederate Monument		Millen, Jenkins County Courthouse	McNeel Marble Works	Marble	June 3, 1909	'in part: "ERECTED JUNE 3RD 1909 / BY/THE WAYSIDE HOME / CHAPTER. U.D.C. / IN HONOR OF OUR / CONFEDERATE SOLDIERS, /WHOM POWER COULD / NOT CORRUPT / WHOM DEATH COULD / NOT TERRIFY, / WHOM DEFEAT COULD / NOT DISHONOR. / THOSE WHO SERVED. / THE/CONFEDERACY. THOSE WHO FOUGHT / THESE WERE MEN WHO / BY THE SIMPLE MANHOOD / OF THEIR LIVES. / BY THEIR STRICT ADHERENCE / TO THE PRINCIPLES OF RIGHTS, / BY THEIR SUBLIME COURAGE. / AND UNSPEAKABLE SACRIFICE, / EVEN TO THE HEROISM OF DEATH, / HAVE PRESERVED FOR US, / THROUGH THE GLOOM OF DEFEAT, / A PRICELESS HERITAGE OF HONOR. / FOR EACH SINGLE WRECK / IN THE WAR PATH OF MIGHT, /HALL YET BE A ROCK IN / THE TEMPLE OF RIGHT. / THOSE WHO FELL / COMRADES.
Jasper County Confederate Monument aka Comrades		Monticello, Town Square	E. B. Frazier, sculptor McNeel Marble Works, fabricator	marble figures, granite	April 6, 1910	"To the Confederate soldiers of Jasper County, the record of whose sublime self-sacrificing and undying devotion to duty in the service of their country is the proud heritage of a loyal posterity "in legend and lay, out heroes in Gray shall forever live, over again for us." Comrades. Gloria Victis CSA, "Crowns of roses fade, crowns of thorns endure, cal varies and crucifixions take deepest hold of humanity, the triumphs of might are transient they pass and are forgotten, the suffering of right are graven deepest on the chronicle of nations."
Comrades		Statesboro, Bulloch County Courthouse	McNeel Marble Works, fabricator	marble	April 26, 1909	in part: "COMRADES / IN MEMORY OF / THE / CONFEDERATE SOLDIERS /1861-1865 / Erected by / The Statesboro Chapter / UNITED DAUGHTERS OF / THE CONFEDERACY / Number 1100 / APRIL 26, 1909
Stone Mountain Memorial Carving		Stone Mountain, Stone Mountain Memorial Park	Gutzon Borglum, Augustus Lukeman, Walker Hancock, sculptors	granite	1923-1972, unveiled May 9, 1970	
Stone Mountain Flag Terrace		Stone Mountain, Stone Mountain Memorial Park				
At Rest Arms		Thomaston, Upson County Courthouse	McNeel Marble Works, fabricator	Statue, Italian marble base, Georgia granite	May 2, 1908	in part: "IN MEMORY OF / THE CONFEDERATE / SOLDIERS OF UPSON / LEST WE FORGET / OUR SOLDIERS
Warren County Confederate Monument		Warrenton, Warren County Courthouse	McNeel Marble Works, fabricator	marble, granite base	June 10, 1904	"Our COMRADES" and a list of names
Wilkes County Confederate Monument		Washington, Wilkes County Courthouse	McNeel Marble Works, fabricator	Granite	April 26, 1909	"ERECTED / ANNO DOMINI 1908 / BY THE / "LAST CABINET" /CHAPTER / UNITED / DAUGHTERS OF THE CONFEDERACY, / LADIES /MEMORIAL ASSOCIATION, / AND / SONS OF VETERANS. / A TRIBUTE / OF ABIDING LOVE / FOR OUR / CONFEDERATE HEROES. / CSA/1861-1865. "ON FAME'S ETERNAL CAMPING GROUND / THEIR SILENT TENTS ARE SPREAD, / AND GLORY GUARDS WITH SOLEMN ROUND / THE BIVOUAC OF THE DEAD." "LORD GOD OF HOSTS BE WITH US YET, / LEST WE FORGET-LEST WE FORGET." MEN OF WILKES! / KNOW THROUGH ALL TIME THAT THEY / FOUGHT TO MAINTAIN A JUST UNION; / TO DEFEND CONSTITUTIONAL GOVERNMENT; / TO PERPETUATE AMERICAN LIBERTIES, / AND LEFT YOU THEIR PATIENT SPIRIT.
Brooks County Confederate Monument		Quitman, Brooks County Courthouse	Unknown (Italian) sculptor	Marble	January 1, 1922	(On bronze plaque on base:) Erected by Quitman Chapter United Daughters of the Confederacy (On right side of canopy:) "TO THOSE WHO (...transcription illegible) TO THOSE WHO GAVE ALL"/QUITMAN AND BROOKS COUNTY DEDICATE THIS MEMORIAL/NOVEMBER 11, 1921 (On five angled stones on base: names of those from Quitman and Brooks County who lost their lives in World War I, World War II, the Korean War, and the Vietnam War) unsigned

== Kentucky ==
Name	Image	Location	Designer/sculptor	Medium	Date	Comments/inscriptions
Statue of Jefferson Davis		Fairview	Frederick Hibbard	Marble	December 10, 1936	Removed from Kentucky State Capitol in 2020 to be placed at Jefferson Davis State Historic Site
John Hunt Morgan Memorial		Lexington, Old Fayette County Courthouse; moved October 2017 to the Confederate section of the Lexington Cemetery	Pompeo Coppini, sculptor Roman Bronze Works, founder	bronze, granite base	dedicated October 18, 1911	"Gen'l. John H. Morgan and his Men."
Lloyd Tilghman Memorial		Paducah, Lang Park	Henry Hudson Kitson, sculptor Roman Bronze Works, founder Eugene Gargani, caster	bronze, granite base	dedicated May 15, 1909	Gift of the United Daughters of the Confederacy and the United Confederate Veterans.
Confederate Monument in Danville		Danville, Kentucky	Clark & Company, fabricator	Marble statue on a granite pedestal	1910	Gift of the Kate Morrison Breckinridge Chapter of the United Daughters of the Confederacy The statue represents Confederate officer, Captain Robert D. Logan (Front of base:) CSA/UDC (as a monogram)/1861-1865/ERECTED BY THE U. D. C./AND THE VETERANS/OF THE C. S. A. OF BOYLE CO./TO THE CONFEDERATE DEAD (Back of base:) WHAT THEY WERE THE WHOLE WORLD KNOWS
Confederate Monument in Murray		Murray	Mcneil Marble Co., Marietta, GA	Marble	1917	In the wake of the George Floyd protests there were calls to remove it but as of July, 2020 the Calloway County Fiscal Court voted unanimously to retain the monument in its present location.

== Louisiana ==
Name	Image	Location	Designer/sculptor	Medium	Date	Comments/inscriptions
Confederate Monument		Baton Rouge, 3rd Street & North Boulevard	Benjamin Joseph Goodman, sculptor	marble	base dedicated February 22, 1886 sculpture dedicated 1890	ERECTED BY THE MEN AND WOMEN OF EAST AND WEST BATON ROUGE TO PERPETUATE THE HEROISM AND PATRIOTIC DEVOTION OF THE NOBLE SOLDIERS FROM THE TWO PARISHES WHO WORE THE GRAY AND CROSSED THE RIVER WITH THEIR IMMORTAL LEADERS TO REST UNDER THE SHADE OF THE TREES. ORIGINAL MONUMENT ERECTED 1886 A.D.
The South's Defenders		Lake Charles, Ryan Street & Kirby Street		marble	base dedicated June 3, 1915	OUR HEROES

== Mississippi ==
Name	Image	Location	Designer/sculptor	Medium	Date	Comments/Inscriptions
Confederate Monument or War Memorial Monument		Belzoni, Humphreys County Courthouse	Columbus Marble Works, fabricator	marble	Spring 1923	Monument includes three figures, a woman, a CSA soldier and a WWI doughboy "The figure of the World War I soldier is the second made for the memorial. The first, modelled after a young ROTC student, included the ROTC insignia on the uniform pocket. The inclusion of the insignia was offensive to the Daughters of the Confederacy, and the statue was sold to State College and replaced with the current one in time for the Dedication Day."
Washington County Confederate Memorial		Greenville, Washington County Courthouse	Columbus Marble Works, fabricator	marble	dedicated June 3, 1909	in part, "Erected by Private Taylor Rucks Chaper United Daughters of the Confederacy to commemorate the valor and patriotism of the Confederate soldiers of Washington County. it is sure the truth of history that the fundamental principles for which our fathers contended should often be reiterated that the purpose which inspired them may be correctly estimated and the putiry of their motives be abundantly vindicated. Charles B. Galloway", "The sublimest word in the English language is duty. Robert E. Lee," "No braver battle for truth was ever fought in vain, Randolph H. McKim", "For those who encountered the perils of war in defense of states rights and constitutional government. Jefferson Davis."
Confederate Monument		Hattiesburg, Forrest County Courthouse	Frank H Hartman, contractor	marble	unveiled April 26, 1910	in part: WHEN THEIR COUNTRY CALLED THEY HELD BACK NOTHING THEY CHEERFULLY GAVE THEIR PROPERTY AND THEIR LIVES THRU THE DEVOTION AND UNTIRING EFFORTS OF THE HATTIESBURG CHAPTER NO. 422 OF THE UNITED DAUGHTERS/OF THE CONFEDERACY, THIS MONUMENT IS ERECTED TO THE HONOR AND MEMORY OF THOSE WHO WORE THE GRAY
Hinds County Confederate Monument		Raymond, Hinds County Courthouse	Frederick Hibbard, sculptor American Bronze Company, founder		April 29, 1908	in part: "WE OF THE SOUTH REMEMBER, WE OF THE SOUTH REVERE. ERECTED BY THE PEOPLE OF HINDS COUNTY, IN GRATEFUL MEMORY OF THEIR MEN WHO IN/1861-65 GAVE, OR OFFERED TO GIVE, THEIR LIVES IN DEFENSE OF CONSTITUTIONAL GOVERNMENT, AND TO THE HEROIC WOMEN WHOSE DEVOTION TO OUR CAUSE IN ITS DARKEST HOUR SUSTAINED THE STRONG AND STRENGTHENED THE WEAK."

== Missouri ==
Name	Image	Location	Designer/sculptor	Medium	Date	Comments/Inscriptions
General Sterling Price		Keytesville, Price Memorial Park	Allen George Newman, sculptor, McNeel Marble Works, fabricator	bronze, concrete base	dedicated June 17, 1915	"GENERAL STERLING PRICE / BORN IN PRINCE EDWARD COUNTY, VIRGINIA / SEPTEMBER 11, 1809 / RESIDED IN CHARITON COUNTY, MISSOURI / 1831-1865 / SPEAKER / OF THE HOUSE OF REPRESENTATIVES / OF MISSOURI GENERAL ASSEMBLY / 1840-1844 / ELECTED TO CONGRESS 1844 / PARTICIPATED IN WAR WITH MEXICO / 1846-1848/RISING FROM RANK OF COLONEL / TO THAT OF BRIGADIER GENERAL / CHAIRMAN OF CONVENTION OF 1861 / MAJOR GENERAL IN COMMAND/OF MISSOURI STATE TROOPS 1861-1862 / DIED IN ST. LOUIS, MISSOURI / SEPTEMBER 29, 1867."

== Montana ==
Name	Image	Location	Designer/sculptor	Medium	Date	Comments
Confederate Memorial Fountain		Helena, North Park	George H. Carsley, architect	granite, copper, bronze, concrete	dedicated September 5, 1916; Removed August 18, 2017	"By the Daughters of the Confederacy in Montana 1916"

== North Carolina ==
Name	Image	Location	Designer/sculptor	Medium	Date	Comments/inscriptions
60th North Carolina Infantry Monument		Asheville, Buncombe County Court House	Cherokee Marbleworks, fabricator	marble, granite base	dedicated November 8, 1905	in part, "By the Asheville Chapter of the Daughters of the Confederacy and Friends, This monument is erected commemorating the heroic part taken by the 60th Regt. N.C. volunteers in the great battle of Chickamauaga, Sept. 20, 1863 where it was given post of honor by "State Commission" appointed in 1893 to locate the position of each N.C. regt. in that battle and a marker placed on east margin of Lafayette Pike in Kelly's Field "
Silent Sam		Chapel Hill	Canadian sculptor John Wilson	bronze	1913	Toppled by protesters, August 20, 2018
Confederate Heroes Monument		Fayetteville, St. James Square	I.W. Durham, sculptor	bronze, granite base	dedicated May 30, 1902	"The women of Cumberland to their Confederate dead, May 20, 1861 - May 10, 1902. The died in defense of their rights. For them should fall the teardrop of a nation's grief. Lord God of Host be with us yet lest we forget, lest we forget"
Confederate Memorial Monument		Graham, Alamance County Courthouse Square	McNeel Marble Works, fabricator	Italian marble, granite base	May 6, 1904	"TO COMMEMORATE / WITH GRATEFUL LOVE, / THE PATRIOTISM, VALOR / AND DEVOTION TO DUTY / OF THE BRAVE SOLDIERS / OF ALAMANCE COUNTY, / THIS MONUMENT IS / ERECTED THROUGH / THE EFFORTS OF THE / GRAHAM CHAPTER, / UNITED DAUGHTERS/OF THE CONFEDERACY. / OUR CONFEDERATE SOLDIERS. "Dedicated May 16, 1914" "ON FAME'S ETERNAL / CAMPING GROUND, / THEIR SILENT TENTS / ARE SPREAD, / AND GLORY GUARDS, / WITH SOLEMN ROUND, / THE BIVOUAC OF THE DEAD." / 1861 / CAS (sic) / 1865 "Faithful unto death / they are crowned / with immortal glory." "Conquered they / can never be / whose souls and / spirits are free."
Memory of N. C. Troops at the Battle of Averasboro - 1865		Harnett County, site of the Battle of Averasboro	Eggerton Monument Company	granite	1968	In part: "Chicoara Chapter, United Daughters of the Confederacy Averasboro/Battleground Centennial Commission 1968, First at Bethel, farthest to the front ay Gettysburg and Chickamauga, last at Appomattox"
Confederate Monument		Monroe, Old Union County Courthouse	Jacob Efird, sculptor	granite	dedicated July 4, 1910	In part: "Union County's Volunteers, Erected by the Monroe Chapter of the UDC July 4, 1910 Dedicated to the Memory of the Boys in Gray from Union County Who Gave Their All to the Protection of Home 1861-1865"
Henry Lawson Wyatt		Raleigh, North Carolina State Capitol	Gutzon Borglum, sculptor Gorham Manufacturing Company, founder	bronze, granite base	dedicated June 10, 1912	First Confederate soldier to die in battle.
Confederate Monument		Shelby, Court Square, Old Cleveland County Courthouse	C.M. Walsh Marble Co,. fabricator, American Bronze Company, founder	bronze, granite	installed November 21, 1906 dedicated spring 1907	
Confederate Soldier		Winston-Salem, Forsyth County Courthouse, Courthouse Square,	James Alfred Blum, designer	granite	dedicated October 3, 1905	"Our confederate dead..in camp on fames eternal camping grounds, as southern soldiers of the war of 1861-65, they share fame that mankind awards to the heroes who served in that great conflict. As southern soldiers of the war of 1861-65, they share the fame that mankind awards to the heroes who served in that great conflict. Sleeping but glorious dead in fames portal dead but victorious but immortal they give us great glory what more could they give? They give us a story a story to live."
Confederate Monument		Yanceyville, Caswell County Courthouse, Public Square	J.F. Manning Company, fabricator American Bronze Company, founder	bronze, granite	dedicated September 10, 1921	"To The Sons of Caswell County who served in the war of 1861-65 In answer to the call of their country In whatever event that may face our national existence may God give us the will to do what is right, that, like our forefathers, we may impress our times with the sincerity and steadfastness of our lives. Erected by the Caswell County Chapter United Daughters of the Confederacy"
Caldwell County Confederate Monument		Lenoir, Lenoir Downtown Historic District	McNeel Marble Works Supplier	Granite	dedicated May, 1910	"Nor shall your glory be forgot while fame her record keeps or honor points the hallowed spot where valor proudly sleeps.” In honor of the men who wore the gray." "From Caldwell County. Co. A 22nd. N.C. Regt. – Infty. Co. F 26th. N.C. Regt. – Infty. Co. I 26th. N.C. Regt. – Infty. Co. E 58th. N.C. Regt. – Infty. Co. H 58th. N.C. Regt. – Infty. and many of her sons in other commands." "Erected by the Vance Chapter of the United Daughters of the Confederacy, of Caldwell County N.C. May 1910."
Fame		Salisbury, downtown from 1909 to 2020, at Old Lutheran Cemetery since 2020	Frederick Ruckstull	bronze, granite	completed in 1891, dedicated on May 10, 1909	After an online petition with over 7,000 signatures called for the statue's removal, the UDC agreed to have it moved from its original location downtown to Old Lutheran Cemetery in 2020.
Confederate Memorial		Wilmington, downtown district	Henry Bacon and Francis Herman Packer	bronze, granite	1924	The statue was dismantled and moved to a secret location in 2020 by the City of Wilmington
George Davis Monument		Wilmington	Francis Herman Packer	bronze, granite	dedicated April 20, 1911	The statue was dismantled by the City of Wilmington in 2021

== Ohio ==
Name	Image	Location	Designer/sculptor	Medium	Date	Comments/inscriptions
The Lookout		Sandusky, Johnson's Island	Moses Ezekiel, sculptor	bronze, granite base	dedicated June 7, 1910	In part: Erected by the Robert Patton Chapter United Daughters of the Confederacy of Cincinnati, Ohio in memory of the Southern prison on this island during the War Between the States. Dead, but sceptered sovereigns who rule us from the dust. This stone upon which this is inscribed was placed by the Grand Lodge of Mississippi in Remembrance of the Masons who sleep here.

== South Carolina ==
Name	Image	Location	Designer/sculptor	Medium	Date	Comments/inscriptions
South Carolina Monument to the Confederate Dead		South Carolina State House, Columbia	Obelisk designed by Muldoon, Walker and Cobb Sculpture designed by Carlo Nicoli		Installed 1879; 1884 (Current location)	Trescot’s inscription asks viewers to “recognize that these were men whom power could not corrupt, whom death could not terrify, [and] whom defeat could not dishonor.” Its unveiling, which took place two years after the “redemption” of Wade Hampton III’s election, served as a statewide celebration of the end of Reconstruction and a way of unifying southern white men and women in a new era of Democratic governance. The figure was replaced in 1882 after the original monument was struck by lightning.
Chester Confederate Monument		Chester, Main & Gadsden Streets	McNeel Marble Works	Georgia granite and marble	June 27, 1905	"THIS MONUMENT GUARDS THE MEMORY OF THE MEN OF CHESTER DISTRICT WHO OBEYING THE CALL OF THEIR STATE DIED FOR THE CONFEDERATE CAUSE 1861-1865 TIME MAY CRUMBLE THIS MARBLE INTO DUST BUT TIME CAN NOT DIM THEIR GLORY. THEIR PATRIOTISM, THEIR VALOR, THEIR FAITHFULNESS AND THEIR FAME REMAIN FOREVER THE HERITAGE OF THEIR/COUNTRYMEN. NON SIBI SED PATRIAE. (translates as "not for self, but country") Their fame increases like the Branches of a tree through the Hidden Courses of Time ERECTED BY DAUGHTERS/OF THE CONFEDERACY. 1905."
Confederate Defenders of Charleston		White Point Garden, Charleston, South Carolina	Hermon Atkins MacNeil	Bronze and granite	October 20, 1932	"TO THE CONFEDERATE DEFENDERS OF CHARLESTON FORT SUMTER 1861–1865" and "COUNT THEM HAPPY WHO FOR THEIR FAITH AND THEIR COURAGE ENDURED A GREAT FIGHT."

== Tennessee ==
Name	Image	Location	Designer/sculptor	Medium	Date	Comments
United Daughters of the Confederacy Monument		800 N. Ocoee Street; Cleveland, Tennessee	McNeel Marble Works	Granite base, marble sculpture	Dedicated June 3, 1911	(Center base, north side:) To our known and unknown Confederate dead (Center base, east side:) Man was not born to himself alone, but to his country 1861-1865 (Center base, west side:) Erected by the Jefferson Davis Chapter United Daughters of the Confederacy 1910
United Daughters of the Confederacy Monument		Fayetteville, Courthouse Square, Lincoln County Courthouse	J. L. Mott Iron Works, founder	painted metal	1904	The statue's pedestal features a drinking fountain on either side.
Our Confederate Soldiers		Franklin, Williamson County Courthouse		Italinan marble, granite base	November 30, 1899	'in part: "ERECTED TO / CONFEDERATE SOLDIERS / BY FRANKLIN CHAPTER / NO. 14 / DAUGHTERS OF / THE CONFEDERACY / NOV. 30, A.D. 1899" " IN HONOR AND MEMORY / OF OUR HEROES / BOTH PRIVATE AND CHIEF / OF THE / SOUTHERN CONFEDERACY. / NO COUNTRY EVER HAD / TRUER SONS, / NO CAUSE / NOBLER CHAMPIONS, / NO PEOPLE / BOLDER DEFENDERS / THAN THE BRAVE SOLDIERS / TO WHOSE MEMORY / THIS STONE IS ERECTED." "WOULD IT BE / A BLAME FOR US / IF THEIR MEMORY PART / FROM OUR LAND AND HEARTS / AND A WRONG TO THEM / AND A SHAME TO US. / THE GLORIES THEY WON / SHALL NOT WANE FROM US. / IN LEGEND AND LAY, OUR HEROES IN GRAY / SHALL EVER LIVE / OVER AGAIN FOR US." "WE WHO SAW AND KNEW THEM WELL / ARE WITNESSES / TO COMING AGES / OF THEIR VALOR / AND FIDELITY. / TRIED AND TRUE. GLORY DROWNED / 1861-1865
General Morgan Monument		Greenville, Greene County Courthouse	Sam Highbarger, sculptor	Tennessee marble	Dedicated May 10, 1931	"GENERAL JOHN H. MORGAN 1825-1864 THE THUNDERBOLT OF THE CONFEDERACY FIRST LIEUTENANT, MARSHAL'S REGIMENT OF CAVALRY IN THE MEXICAN WAR CAPTAIN THE "LEXINGTON RIFLES" 1857 CAPTAIN COMPANY A OF THE KENTUCKY CAVALRY 1861 COLONELL 2ND KENTUCKY CAVALRY 1862 BRIGADIER GENERAL APPOINTED FROM TENNESSEE DECEMBER 11 1862. HIS COMMAND, NEVER EXCEEDING 4000/MEN, WAS COMPOSED LARGELY OF KEN TUCKIANS AND TENNESSEANS. IT WAS RENOWNED FOR BOLDNESS AND CELERITY ON RAID CARRYING TERROR INTO THE RE GION NORTH OF THE OHIO. THE "GREAT RAIDER" WAS SURPRISED AT NIGHT AND KILLED BY A DETACHMENT OF THE COMMAND OF GEN. A. C. GILLEM ON THE PREMISES OF THE WILLIAMS HOME/NEAR THIS SPOT SEPTEMBER 4 1864 HIS HEROISM IS THE HERITAGE OF THE SOUTH"
Memorial Hall (women's college dormitory)		Nashville, Peabody College campus of Vanderbilt University	Henry C. Hibbs, architect	building	1935	The word "Confederate" was removed from its name in 2016.
United Daughters of the Confederacy Memorial		Shiloh, Shiloh National Military Park	Frederick Hibbard		May 17, 1917	

== Texas ==
Name	Image	Location	Designer/sculptor	Medium	Date	Comments/inscriptions
Confederate Monument		Bonham, Fannin County Courthouse, NW corner of Courthouse Square	Bonham Marble Works, fabricator.	stone with granite base	dedicated April 26, 1905	"To the Confederate Soldiers who sacrificed their lives for a just cause this monument is loving (sic) dedicated by the Daughters of the Confederacy aided by there (sic) Confederate Veterans Association of Fannin County. From 1861 to 1865 they fought for principal (sic), their homes and those they loved on fames eternal camping ground their silent tents are spread and glory guards with solemn round the bivouac of the dead. Battles fought 2242, total enlistment Confederate army 600,000, total enlistment U.S. Army 2,776,304, federal prisoners captured by confederates 270,000, confederate prisoners captured by federalist (sic) 220,000. CO. E. 11th Tex. Cav./Cof, 11th Tex. Cav. (On north side of base:) The great war unrivaled in history for bravery, gallantry, daring and dash."
Queen of the Sea		Corpus Christi, Broadway Bluff, Peoples Street & Broadway	Pompeo Coppini, sculptor	cast concrete bas relief	dedicated April 26, 1911	A fountain flanked by stairs, with an arched bas-relief tableau of Neptune and Mother Earth crowning an allegorical figure of Corpus Christi. In part: "In memory of the soldiers of the Confederacy erected by the Corpus Christi Chapter of the Daughters of the Confederacy."
Call To Arms		Corsicana, Navarro County Courthouse	Louis Amateis, sculptor Bureau Brothers, founder	bronze	January 1909	
Confederate Monument		Dallas, Pioneer Park Cemetery (formerly located in City Park, 1897-1961)	Frank Teich, sculptor Teich Monument Works, fabricator	obelisk & bases: Texas granite statues: Carrara marble	cornerstone laid June 25, 1896 dedicated April 29, 1897	A 51.5 ft (15.7 m) granite obelisk crowned by a Confederate soldier statue, surrounded by 9 ft (2.7 m) marble statues of Robert E. Lee, Jefferson Davis, Albert Sidney Johnston and Stonewall Jackson; Inscriptions: "THE BRAZEN LIPS OF SOUTHERN / CANNON THUNDERED AN UNANSWERED / ANTHEM TO THE GOD OF BATTLE." "THE CONFEDERATE SABREUR KIS / SED HIS BLADE HOMEWARD RIDING / STRAIGHT INTO THE MOUTH OF / HELL." "IT WAS GIVEN THE GENIUS AND VALOR / OF CONFEDERATE SEAMEN TO REVOLU / TIONIZE NAVAL WARFARE OVER THE / EARTH." "CONFEDERATE INFANTRY DROVE / BAYONETS THROUGH COLUMNS / THAT NEVER BEFORE REELED TO / THE SHOCK OF BATTLE." "THIS STONE SHALL CRUMBLE INTO DUST ERE / THE DEATHLESS DEVOTION OF SOUTHERN WOMEN / BE FORGOTTEN." "ERECTED BY / THE DAUGHTERS OF THE CONFEDERACY / DALLAS CHAPTER NO. 6. / JUNE 25TH 1896."
Dignified Resignation		Galveston, Galveston County Courthouse	Louis Amateis, sculptor	bronze	dedicated June 3, 1912	
Confederate Soldier Monument		Gainesville, Cooke County Courthouse		stone	Erected 1911, moved to the courthouse lawn at a later date	"God holds the scales of justice; He will measure praise and blame; And the South will stand the verdict, And will stand it without shame. Oh, home of tears, but let her bear This blazoned to the end of time; No nation rose so white and fair, None fell so free of crime."
Spirit of the Confederacy		Houston, Sam Houston Park	Louis Amateis, sculptor Roman Bronze Works, Bureau Brothers, founder	bronze	dedicated January 19, 1908	in part: "The Spirit of the Confederacy erected by the Robert E. Lee Chapter N. 186 U.D.C. January 1908 To all heroes of the South who fought for the principles of states rights"
Confederate Soldier Monument		Llano, Llano County Courthouse	James Finlay, and sons Jack and Jim Finlay	granite	dedicated February 22, 1916	"To our Confederate dead 1861-1865. Erected by Llano Co. Chapter U.D.C. 1915"
World War I and Confederate Soldier Monument		Memphis, Hall County Courthouse,	G.W. Backus, designer	marble	dedicated March 18, 1924	The monument includes two full sized figures, a CSA soldier and a World War I doughboy.
John H. Reagan Monument		Palestine, John H. Reagan Park	Pompeo Coppini, sculptor	bronze, concrete base	dedicated July 16, 1911	in part: "The old Roman's highest ambition was to do his full duty: consciousness of having done it was his ample reward. A good name is to be chosen that great riches and looking (sic) favor rather than silver or gold. ……Author memoirs of secession and the Civil War."
Confederate Mothers Monument		Texarkana, United Daughters of the Confederacy Park	"ordered from Italy"; Henry Allen, designer Allen Monuments, fabricator	marble	dedicated April 21, 1918	
The Last Stand		Victoria, DeLeon Plaza	Pompeo Coppini, sculptor Roman Bronze Works, founder	bronze, granite base	dedicated July 10, 1912	in part: "To the soldiers of the Confederate States of America. This monument is dedicated by the William P. Rogers Chapter, United Daughters of the Confederacy, Victoria, Texas. June the Third A.D. Nineteen Hundred and Twelve. On civilizations (sic) height, immutable they stand"
Confederate Monument at Marshall, Texas		Marshall, Texas - Harrison County Courthouse	Frank Teich, Sculptor at the request of the United Daughters of the Confederacy	marble sculpture, granite base	dedicated on Robert E. Lee's birthday, January 16, 1906	(On front of base, raised letters:) CONFEDERATE (On back of base, raised letters:) ERECTED IN MEMORY OF OUR/CONFEDERATE SOLDIERS/BY THE/UNITED DAUGHTERS OF THE CONFEDERACY/MARSHALL CHAPTER NO. 412/1905/THE LOVE, GRATITUDE, AND MEMORY/OF THE PEOPLE OF THE SOUTH,/SHALL GILD THEIR FAME IN ONE/ETERNAL SUNSHINE. (On one side of base:) SOLDIERS, YOU IN THE WRECK OF GRAY/WITH THE BRAZEN BELT OF C.S.A./TAKE OUR LOVE AND TEARS TO-DAY./TAKE, THEN, ALL THAT WE HAVE TO GIVE,/AND BY GOD'S HELP WHILE OUR HEART SHALL LIVE/IT SHALL KEEP IN ITS FAITHFUL WAY/THE CAMPFIRE LIT FOR THE MEN IN GRAY-/AYE, TILL TRUMPET SOUND FAR AWAY/AND THE SILVER BUGLE OF HEAVEN PLAY/AND THE ROLL IS CALLED AT JUDGEMENT DAY." (On other side of base:) NO MORE HEAR THE REBEL YELL,/WHERE BATTLE THUNDERS ROSE AND FELL;/TIS NOW A WELCOME AND A CHEER/TO FRIENDS, TO FOEMEN, FAR AND NEAR,/AND PEACE, SWEET PEACE, BORN OF DISPAIR (sic)/WALKS FORTH AND SHEDS HER RADIENCE (sic) FAIR/UPON LOST FIELDS OF HONOR." unsigned

== Virginia ==
Name	Image	Location	Designer/sculptor	Medium	Date	Comments/inscriptions
Appomattox		Alexandria, Washington & Prince Streets	bronze with granite base	Caspar Buberl, sculptor, from a painting by John Adams Elder	dedicated May 24, 1889	Statue removed June 2020 by the UDC
Confederate Monument		Arlington, Arlington National Cemetery	Moses Ezekiel, sculptor H. Gladenbeck & Sohn, founder	bronze on granite base	unveiled June 4, 1914	in part: "And they shall beat their swords into plough-shares and their spears into pruning hooks. Not for fame or reward not for place or for rank- not lured by ambition-or goaded by necessity- but in simple obedience to duty-as they understood it-these men suffered all-sacrificed all-dared all-and died" Randolph Harrison McKim. To our dead heroes by the United Daughters of the Confederacy-Victrix-causa-diis-placuit-sed-victa-catoni" (translated "the victorious cause pleased the gods, but the conquered cause pleased Cato)
The Confederate Soldiers' Monument		Danville, Green Hill Cemetery	M Hayes, Samuel Walters, sculptors	copper reliefs with granite base	unveiled September 3, 1878	in part: GEN. ROBERT E. LEE. CONFEDERATE DEAD. MEMORIAL TRIBUTE/OF VIRGINIA'S DAUGHTERS TO THE FALLEN BRAVE. DANVILLE, VIRGINIA. GEN. THOMAS J. JACKSON THEY DIED AS MEN WHO NOBLY CONTEND FOR THE CAUSE OF TRUTH AND RIGHT." THEY SOFTLY LIE AND SWEETLY SLEEP." PATRIOTS! KNOW THAT THESE FELL IN THE EFFORT TO ESTABLISH JUST GOVERNMENT AND PERPETUATE CONSTITUTIONAL LIBERTY. WHO THUS DIE WILL LIVE IN LOFTY EXAMPLE. QUIDQUID EX HIS AMAVIMUS,/QUIDQUID MIRATI SUMUS,/MANET MANSURUMQUE EST IN/ANIMIS HOMINUM, IN/AETERNITATE TEMPORUM, FAMA RERUM. Latin translates as :"[Anything out of those we have loved, whatever we admired, would continue to remain in the hearts of men, in the eternity of time, the reputation of things.]" erected by the Ladies' Memorial Association of Danville, administered by United Daughters of the Confederacy.
Confederate Monument at Dinwiddie Courthouse		Dinwiddie, Courthouse Square	granite	Ben Campbell, Burns and Campbell, fabricator	November 27, 1909	"In memory of Dindiddie's Confederate soldiers, that their heroic deeds. sublime self-sacrifice and undying devotion to duty and country may never be forgotten"
Soldiers Circle		Front Royal, Prospect Hill Cemetery	John B Graver, sculptor McNeel Marble Works, fabricator	Italian marble	August 24, 1882	IN MEMORY OF THE ONE HUNDRED AND EIGHTY SIX HONORED MEN WHO LIE BURIED HERE, FROM THIS AND OTHER SOUTHERN STATES THEY GAVE THEIR LIVES IN DEFENSE OF TRUTH AND RIGHT. THEY DIED IN THE CAUSE/OF HONOR AND JUSTICE. VIRGINIA HONORS THE/BRAVE ERECTED AUG. 24, 1882, BY THE LADIES' WARREN MEMORIAL ASSOCIATION
Robert E. Lee Memorial		Roanoke, Lee Plaza	JH Marsteller Monument Company	stone	1960	In June 2020, the Roanoke City Council voted to start the legal process to remove the monument and rename Lee Plaza after the July 1, 2020 date when a new state law removes the prohibition against removing monuments to the Confederate States of America.
Confederate Monument		Salem, Old Roanoke County Courthouse	JH Marsteller Monument Company	granite	June 3, 1910	'In memory of the Confederate soldiers of Roanoke County, 1861-1865. Love makes memory eternal. Erected by the Southern Cross Chapter U.D.C. Salem Va. Also the Va. Div. Badge of the U.D.C.
Monument to the Confederate Soldiers		Sussex, Sussex County Courthouse Green	McNeel Marble Works, fabricator	stone	November 1912	in part: "THE PRINCIPLES FOR / WHICH THEY FOUGHT / LIVE ETERNALLY" / OUR / CONFEDERATE / SOLDIERS / LIST OF COMPANIES ORGANIZED IN / AND SENT OUT FROM SUSSEX COUNTY / FOR ROLL OF MEMBERS SEE RECORDS / IN THE COUNTY CLERK'S OFFICE / ERECTED BY / SUSSEX CHAPTER U.D.C. / NOV. - 1912 / CHAPTER ORGANIZED / SEPT. 29, 1909.
Confederate Monument		Warm Springs, Bath County Courthouse	McNeel Marble Works, fabricator	stone	unveiled September 20, 1922	"CONFEDERATE / SOLDIERS / 1861-1865 / 'LEST WE FORGET' ERECTED BY / BATH CO. CHAPTER / U.D.C . / 1922"

== Washington ==
Name	Image	Location	Designer/sculptor	Medium	Date	Comments/inscriptions
Confederate monument		Seattle, Lake View Cemetery		stone	1926	"In memory of the / United Confederate Veterans / Erected by Robert E. Lee / Chapter Number 885 / United Daughters / of the Confederacy / 1926″

This monument was toppled on the July 4, 2020 weekend, by persons unknown (as of July 6, 2020).

== West Virginia ==
Name	Image	Location	Designer/sculptor	Medium	Date	Comments/inscriptions
Thomas J. "Stonewall" Jackson		Clarksburg, Harrison County Courthouse	Charles Keck, sculptor Gorham Manufacturing Company, founder	bronze, granite base	May 10, 1953	Inscriptions: "Look at Jackson There -- Standing Like a Stonewall" / Brig. Gen. Bec, at the first battle of Manassas / Thomas J. "Stonewall" Jackson, Lt. General, C.S.A. / Born in Clarksburg, January 21, 1824. Died May 10, 1863. / From Wounds received near Chancellorsville, Virginia, While Fighting For a Cause he Believed to be Just. / A world Renowned Soldier and Military Strategist / Who Walked Humbly With His God"; Erected by the Stonewall Jackson Chapter, United Daughters of the Confederacy. A replica of Keck's 1921 statue in Charlottesville, Virginia.
Confederate Soldier		Parkersburg, City Park	Leon Hermant, sculptor	bronze, granite base	July 21, 1908	"CONFEDERATE STATES OF AMERICA IN MEMORY OF OUR CONFEDERATE DEAD, ERECTED BY PARKERSBURG CHAPTER UNITED DAUGHTERS OF CONFEDERACY, 1908"
Thomas J. "Stonewall" Jackson		Charleston, Capitol Lawn	Moses Ezekiel, sculptor	bronze (?), marble and granite base	September 27, 1910	Inscriptions: "WHY THEY CALLED HIM STONEWALL" At the first Battle of Mannasses July 21, 1861 the first great battle of the Civil War General Jackson's Brigade of Virginia Volunteers—twelve companies being from West Virginia—saved the day to the Confederate arms. The Confederates were falling back General Barnard Bee's South Carolina Brigade was retreating. Jackson's Virginians were standing under fire. Bee in an effort to rally his own men called out: "See! There stands Jackson like a stone wall." Henceforth his brigade was known as the "Stonewall Brigade." Poem by John G. Gittings: "Jackson stands there like a stone wall," he said As he pointed his sword across the battle-field Brigade Thus the name—none prouder on spotless shield Than 'Stonewall,' the sobriquet to valor paid."
Heyward Shepherd monument		Harpers Ferry, Potomac Street	Peter-Burghard Stone Company, fabricator	Granite	October 12, 1931	"ON THE NIGHT OF OCTOBER 16, 1859,/HEYWARD SHEPHERD, AN INDUSTRIOUS/AND RESPECTED COLORED FREEMAN,/WAS MORTALLY WOUNDED BY JOHN/BROWN'S RAIDERS IN PURSUANCE/OF HIS DUTIES AS AN EMPLOYEE OF/THE BALTIMORE AND OHIO RAILROAD/COMPANY. HE BECAME THE FIRST/VICTIM OF THIS ATTEMPTED/INSURRECTION./THIS BOULDER IS ERECTED BY/THE UNITED DAUGHTERS OF THE/CONFEDERACY AND THE SONS OF/CONFEDERATE VETERANS AS A/MEMORIAL TO HEYWARD SHEPHERD,/EXEMPLIFYING THE CHARACTER AND/FAITHFULNESS OF THOUSANDS OF/NEGROES WHO, UNDER MANY/TEMPTATIONS THROUGHOUT/SUBSEQUENT YEARS OF WAR, SO/CONDUCTED THEMSELVES THAT/NO STAIN WAS LEFT UPON A RECORD/WHICH IS THE PECULIAR HERITAGE/OF THE AMERICAN PEOPLE, AND AN/EVERLASTING TRIBUTE TO THE BEST/IN BOTH RACES."

== See also ==
- List of Confederate monuments and memorials, for a comprehensive list of monuments and memorials, places, schools, parks, streets, geographical features, and other objects named for the Confederacy or its members
- Removal of Confederate monuments and memorials, for those that have been removed
