= Confederate Memorial Fountain =

Confederate Memorial Fountain may refer to two fountains:

- Confederate Memorial Fountain in Hopkinsville in Hopkinsville, Kentucky, U.S.
- Confederate Memorial Fountain (Helena, Montana) in Helena, Montana, U.S.
- Coppini Confederate Memorial Fountain, also known as the Littlefield Fountain, in Austin, Texas, U.S.
