= Confederate Mothers Monument =

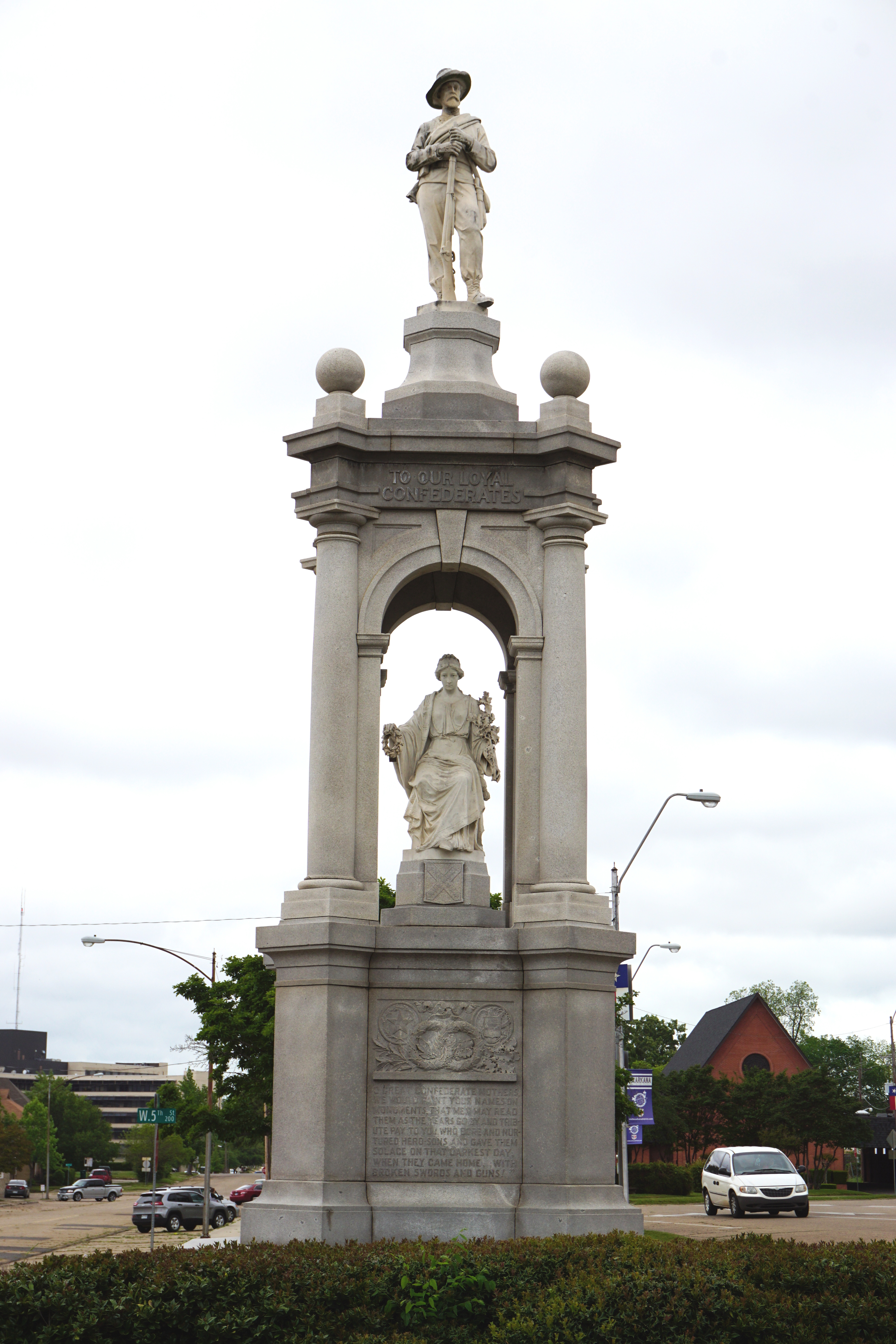
- The monument in 2016
- Artist: Henry Allen
- Year: 1918
- Medium: Sculpture
- Location: Texarkana, Texas, U.S.; 33.4246°N 94.0433°W

The Confederate Mothers Monument, also known as simply Confederate Memorial, Confederate Monument, or Texarkana Confederate Memorial, is an outdoor Confederate memorial installed at 500 State Line Road in Texarkana. It stands alone in a triangle bounded by roads on the West side of State Line Avenue, just inside the U.S. state of Texas. and faces the court house and post office, a building unusual for sitting in and serving two states.

== Description and history ==
The monument was dedicated on April 21, 1918. It was designed by Henry Allen and constructed by Allen Monuments. The two figures were obtained from Italy. Thought to be the only Confederate monument to include a woman in Texas, it is carved from marble.

The monument's inscription for the Confederate mother statue reads: "O Great Confederate Mothers, we would print your names on monuments, that men may read them as the years go by and tribute pay to you, who bore and nurtured hero sons and gave them solace on that darkest hour, when they came home with broken swords and guns". The inscription for the Confederate soldier reads, "To our loyal Confederates". The soldier faces north.

The chapter of the United Daughters of the Confederacy that built the Confederate Mothers Monument was disbanded and a new chapter does not own the monument so the city is responsible for maintenance.

== See also ==
- 1918 in art
- List of Confederate monuments and memorials
- List of monuments erected by the United Daughters of the Confederacy
