= United Daughters of the Confederacy Monument (Cleveland, Tennessee) =

Monument in Cleveland, Tennessee, United States

- Year: 1910
- Medium: Granite, Italian marble
- Dimensions: 8.5 m × 3.7 m (28 ft × 12 ft)
- Location: 800 N. Ocoee Street; Cleveland, Tennessee, United States
- Owner: United Daughters of the Confederacy

The United Daughters of the Confederacy Monument is a Confederate monument in Cleveland, Tennessee, owned by the United Daughters of the Confederacy. It was sculpted in 1910 and installed in 1911.

== Description ==
The monument is located on a small plot of land in the north end of downtown Cleveland in the median of U.S. Route 11 (Ocoee Street, Broad Street) and adjacent to Eighth Street. It is near Lee University and is located within a historic district.

The 28-foot (8.5 m) tall statue consists of a granite obelisk topped by a marble sculpture of a Confederate soldier facing north, and weighs more than 15,000 pounds (6,800 kg). The north face of the monument consists of engravings of the Virginia Battle Flag and Blood-Stained Banner, and contains the words "To our known and unknown Confederate dead" on the base. The south face contains an engraving of two crossed Springfield rifles. The eastern face of the monument contains the Jefferson Davis quote "Man was not born to himself alone but to his country," and the western face contains the words "Erected by the Jefferson Davis Chapter United Daughters of the Confederacy 1910."

== History ==
The United Daughters of the Confederacy Jefferson Davis Chapter 900 voted on October 5, 1906, to begin raising funds for the monument, which was intended to serve as a memorial to unknown dead Confederate soldiers. McNeel Marble Works of Marietta, Georgia, quarried the granite that composes the obelisk, and the figure of the soldier was sculpted in Italy out of Italian marble. The monument cost more than $3,000 (equivalent to $72,812 in 2024) and was complete by December 1910, when it arrived in Cleveland by train. On February 13, 1911, the City of Cleveland conveyed the land for the monument to the UDC. An existing monument, erected in 1890 in memory of three local citizens who died in a train wreck, was removed to make way for the monument, but re-erected next to the Confederate monument after a court case. The foundation and base of the monument, including a sealed box containing memorabilia, were installed on May 31, 1911, and on June 3, 1911, a dedication ceremony for the monument took place. The ceremony was attended by both Union and Confederate veterans. It was reportedly the first monument of its type in East Tennessee. During the dedication ceremony, the Mayor of Cleveland stated in his speech "This monument is not erected in malice or in anger and nothing connected with it is meant as a reflection on the honor, bravery or heroism of any soldier of the North. It is erected in tearful memory and loving gratitude to our fathers." He also described both Union and Confederate soldiers as heroic.

The bayonet on the soldier's rifle atop the statue was reportedly destroyed by vandals in the late 1920s or early 1930s, reportedly angry about losing a football game, and restored on July 2, 1993.

On June 11, 2011, the local UDC Chapter held a ceremony at the monument commemorating the 100th anniversary of its dedication.

On June 8, 2020, during the global George Floyd protests, a petition was started to relocate the monument to a location deemed more suitable, such as a museum or local historic site. This was quickly followed by multiple counter-petitions. On June 29, 2020, the United Daughters of the Confederacy stated that they would not be removing the monument.

== See also ==
- List of monuments erected by the United Daughters of the Confederacy
