= George Davis Monument =

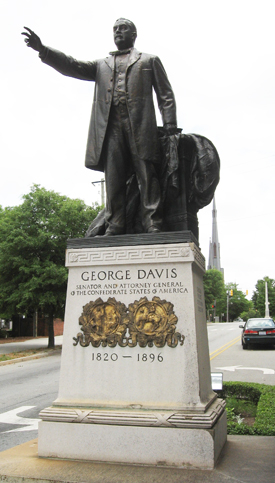
- George Davis monument before the statue's removal and covering of the pedestal with a black shroud.
- Interactive map of George Davis Monument
- Location: Wilmington, North Carolina
- Coordinates: 34.23556°N 77.94577°W
- Designer: Francis Herman Packer
- Type: Monument
- Material: Bronze, granite
- Height: 8 feet
- Weight: 1,700 pounds
- Dedicated date: April 20, 1911
- Restored date: 2000
- Dedicated to: George Davis
- Dismantled date: 2020

The George Davis Monument is a monument to attorney and Confederate politician George Davis that was erected in Wilmington, North Carolina by the United Daughters of the Confederacy. It was removed by the City of Wilmington in August 2021.

Davis, a railroad attorney and minor local figure before the war, was a pro-Union member of the Whig Party. After secession, he accepted appointments to the Confederate senate and as attorney general. He was a skilled orator who spoke publicly in March 1861 that North Carolina should secede from the United States of America principally to preserve the economic interest in chattel slavery.

The statue was unveiled on April 20, 1911

In the early morning hours of June 25, 2020, the City of Wilmington removed the statue of Davis "in order to protect the public safety and to preserve important historical artifacts."

The dismantling was coincident with the firing of three city police officers following the discovery of their "brutally racist" discussions on official police recording equipment. The pedestal, with its Lost Cause inscriptions, was covered with a shroud. By June 30, the pedestal was covered with a black shroud, which obscured the inscriptions.

On August 2, 2021, the City Council voted to permanently remove the monument from public property. The city recognized ownership by Cape Fear 3, United Daughters of the Confederacy. The city will store away the statue and pedestal until the UDC is ready to take possession. In a statement, the government said it considered the matter of the disposition of the statue closed.

== History ==
=== Davis Remembered for Oratory ===
When the monument project was conceived, Davis was well-remembered among the city's white elite as a skilled orator. The statue depicts Davis, hand on lectern, giving a speech.

==== March 1861 Speech: Secession to Preserve Slavery ====
In his political life before 1861, Davis was not a member of the regionally dominant Democratic Party, but a Whig. Until March 1861, he opposed secession. During the election of 1860, he supported a pro-Union, third-party candidate for president.

However, his position changed during his attendance at the failed Washington Peace Conference in February 1861.

On March 2, 1861, Davis gave a public speech in Wilmington on secession. In it, he declared himself a secessionist. He argued that North Carolina should secede in order to preserve slavery:

"The division must be made on the line of slavery. The State must go with the South."

=== Conception ===
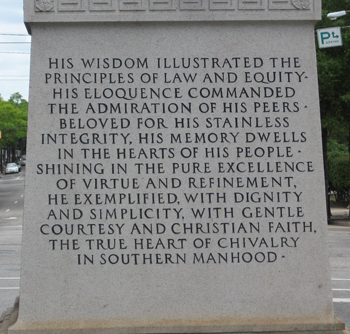
Specious "Lost Cause" inscription on monument.

The idea for the monument was conceived by Cape Fear 3, United Daughters of the Confederacy (UDC) in 1901 — three years after white mobs used violence to illegally remove a duly elected biracial government during the Wilmington massacre, five years after Davis's death and 36 years after the Confederacy's defeat.

Historians have stated that similar monuments are evidence of a wide effort by the UDC and others, long after the failure of the Confederacy, to insert the false Lost Cause Narrative into the cultural memory, announce to nonwhites the final defeat of Reconstruction, and to support white supremacy.

It took years for the women of Cape Fear 3 to realize their vision.

=== Funding ===
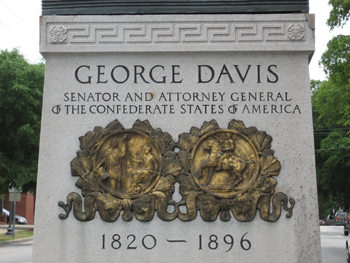
Front inscription and artwork, including the seal of the defeated Confederacy.

UDC Cape Fear Chapter 3 began raising money in 1904 but fundraising was slow, despite the urgency the UDC presented to the community. The minute book of the chapter shows fundraising was complete in April 1909, with the chapter having raised nearly $900.

The rest was raised by James Sprunt, a cotton brokerage heir who as a young man had worked aboard blockade-running commercial ships and was a profiteer during the US Civil War. Sprunt provided funding he said he had gathered from friends and colleagues. His portion brought the total amount raised to $5,010.34 ($179,537 in 2025 dollars).

=== Creation ===
The statue was sculpted by Francis Herman Packer, a native of Germany who lived on Long Island, New York and was a student of Augustus Saint-Gaudens.

The sculptor's travel was paid for by Sprunt. Packer's sculpture was cast by the Gorham Manufacturing Company in 1910 in Rhode Island.

The statue is 8 feet tall bound bronze weighing 1,700 pounds. The stone pedestal weighs five and a half tons and shows gilded seals of North Carolina and the former Confederate States of America.

Inscriptions on the pedestal include a long, specious encomium to Davis's alleged virtues.

A decade later, the UDC hired Packer to sculpt another confederate memorial (removed, August 2021) one block south, at Third Street and Dock Street.

=== Siting and Context ===
The monument stood on a grassy traffic island in Market Street just east of its intersection with Third Street — the crossroads of the city. It stood within sight of Wilmington's city hall, the New Hanover County courthouse and St. James Episcopal Parish, the city's oldest Christian church.

The statue faced west, toward the terminus of Market Street at the Cape Fear River, a marketplace where enslaved men, women and children were sold from the days of the city's settlement in the early 18th century until the city's capture by the Union Army in 1865 during the US Civil War.

=== Erection and Dedication ===
The cornerstone of the monument was laid on October 14, 1909, during a Masonic ceremony. Within the cornerstone were placed:

- A copy of the first number Carolina Churchman, dated October 1909
- A copy of the commission of George Davis as Attorney General of the Confederate states, dated January 4, 1864
- Coins

The monument was dedicated on April 20, 1911, by four of Davis's grandsons: M.F.H. Gouverneur Jr., Donald McRae Jr., George Rountree, and Robert Cowan Davis.

U.S. District Court Judge Henry G. Connor of the United States District Court for the Eastern District of North Carolina, delivered the dedication speech. The Delgado Band was hired for $25 to provide musical accompaniment.

Connor's dedicatory remarks contained hallmarks that many historians have ascribed to examples of revisionist Lost Cause mythology. Connor falsely described Davis's making war against the United States as "patriotism" and Davis's call for secession from the Union as "moderation in speech":

“You shall bring your sons to this spot, tell them the story of his life, of his patriotism of his loyalty to high thinking and noble living, of his moderation in speech, his patience under defeat, of his devotion to your City and State as a perpetual illustration and an enduring example of the dignity, the worth of a high-souled, pure-hearted Christian gentleman.”

=== Family and Political Use, Damage, and Vandalism ===
==== 1993 ====
The Sons of Confederate Veterans "George Davis Camp 5" celebrated George Davis's birthday at the monument.

==== 1995 ====
Davis's descendants held a ceremony at the monument.

==== 2000 ====
In October, a truck belonging to Hanover Iron Works knocked the statue from its base, causing a dent to the back of the head and cracks to the neck and right shoulder. Repairs, which included re-carving the base, cost $25,000 and took more than a year to complete.

The monument was re-erected in February 2002, 6 feet from its original site, and raised up on a new 6-inch curb.

==== 2019 ====
On June 29, a crowd rallied, demanding the city to remove the monument.

In the early hours of July 4, an unknown person threw orange paint on the monument.

=== Dismantling, Covering and Removal ===
==== 2020 ====
In June, the City of Wilmington removed the statue, but not its pedestal, to "protect the public safety and to preserve important historical artifacts." Later, the pedestal was covered with a black shroud, obscuring its inscriptions.

In September, Wilmington's mayor said that the threat to public safety that conditioned the memorial's dismantling continued. A majority of the Wilmington City Council told a journalist that the disposition of the city's Confederate monuments was not a high priority.

==== 2021 ====
The city attorney had been assigned to research ownership and other issues. During that process, Cape Fear 3, United Daughters of the Confederacy approached the city and asserted a claim on the statue. The claim was based on the facts that, at the time, the UDC chapter had commissioned the statue and had sought city permission to erect it on public property using private funds.

The city attorney concurred. In a July 5 letter to the city, Cape Fear 3 requested that the city hold the monument in storage until Cape Fear 3 had made arrangements to take possession. With the statue already in storage, the city agreed to move the pedestal into storage as well.

In August, the City Council approved the agreement. In a statement, the government said the effects of the vote were to permanently remove the monument from public land and avoid litigation.

== Gallery ==
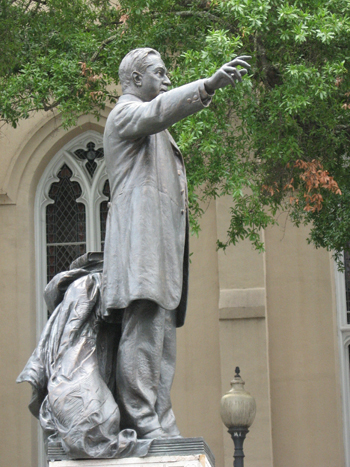
Right side of the George Davis Monument in Wilmington, North Carolina

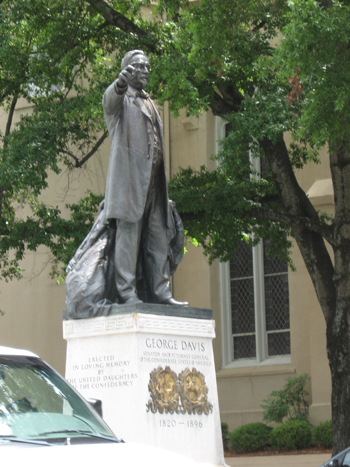
The monument and its base from the right corner

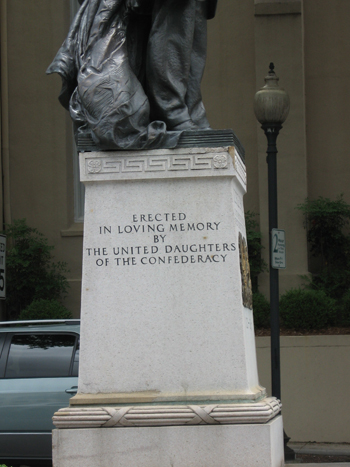
Inscription on the right side of the monument.

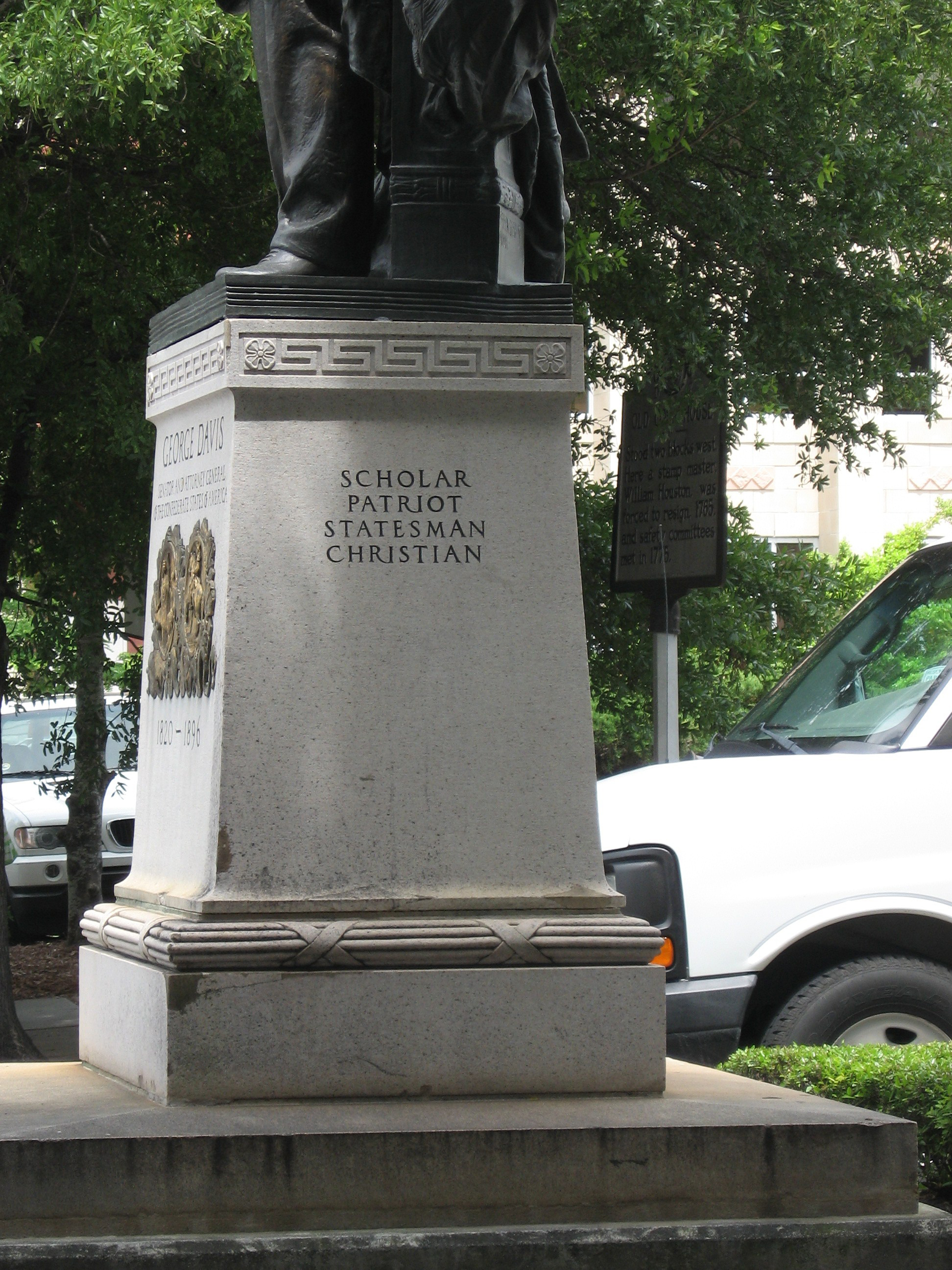
Inscription on the left side of the monument.

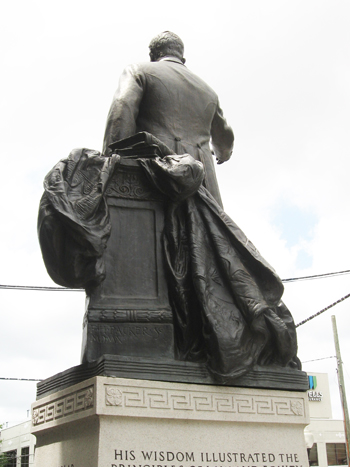
View of the George Davis Monument sculpture from the back

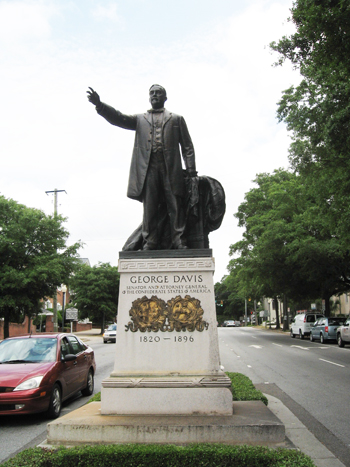
Frontal view of the monument on Market Street

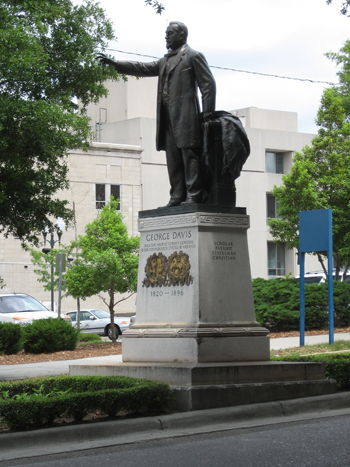
The monument and its base from the left corner

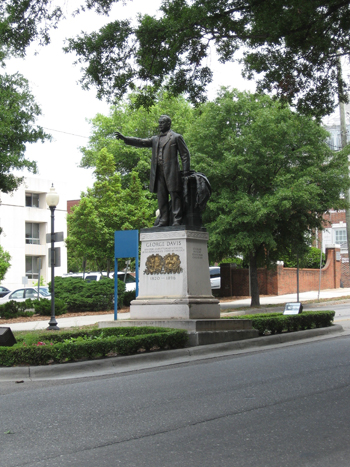
The George Davis Monument on the corner of Market and Third Streets in Wilmington, NC
