= George H. Carsley =

American architect

George Hollis Carsley
- Born: April 7, 1870; Wisconsin, U.S.
- Died: July 4, 1933 (aged 63)
- Education: University of Minnesota
- Occupation: Architect

George H. Carsley (April 7, 1870 - July 4, 1933) was an American architect. He designed many buildings in Helena, Montana, including structures now listed on the National Register of Historic Places. He also designed a number of buildings on the campus of the University of Montana in Missoula, Montana.

== Early life ==
George Hollis Carsley was born on April 7, 1870, in Wisconsin. He grew up in Helena, Montana. He graduated from the University of Minnesota in 1896.

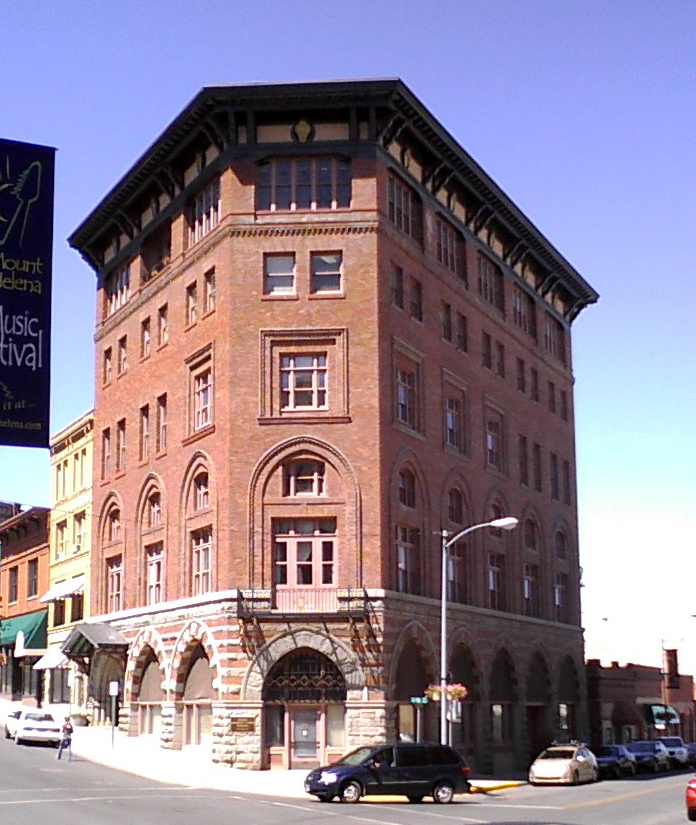
The Montana Club, designed by Gilbert & Carsley.

== Career ==
Carsley began his career by working for architect Cass Gilbert in Saint Paul, Minnesota.

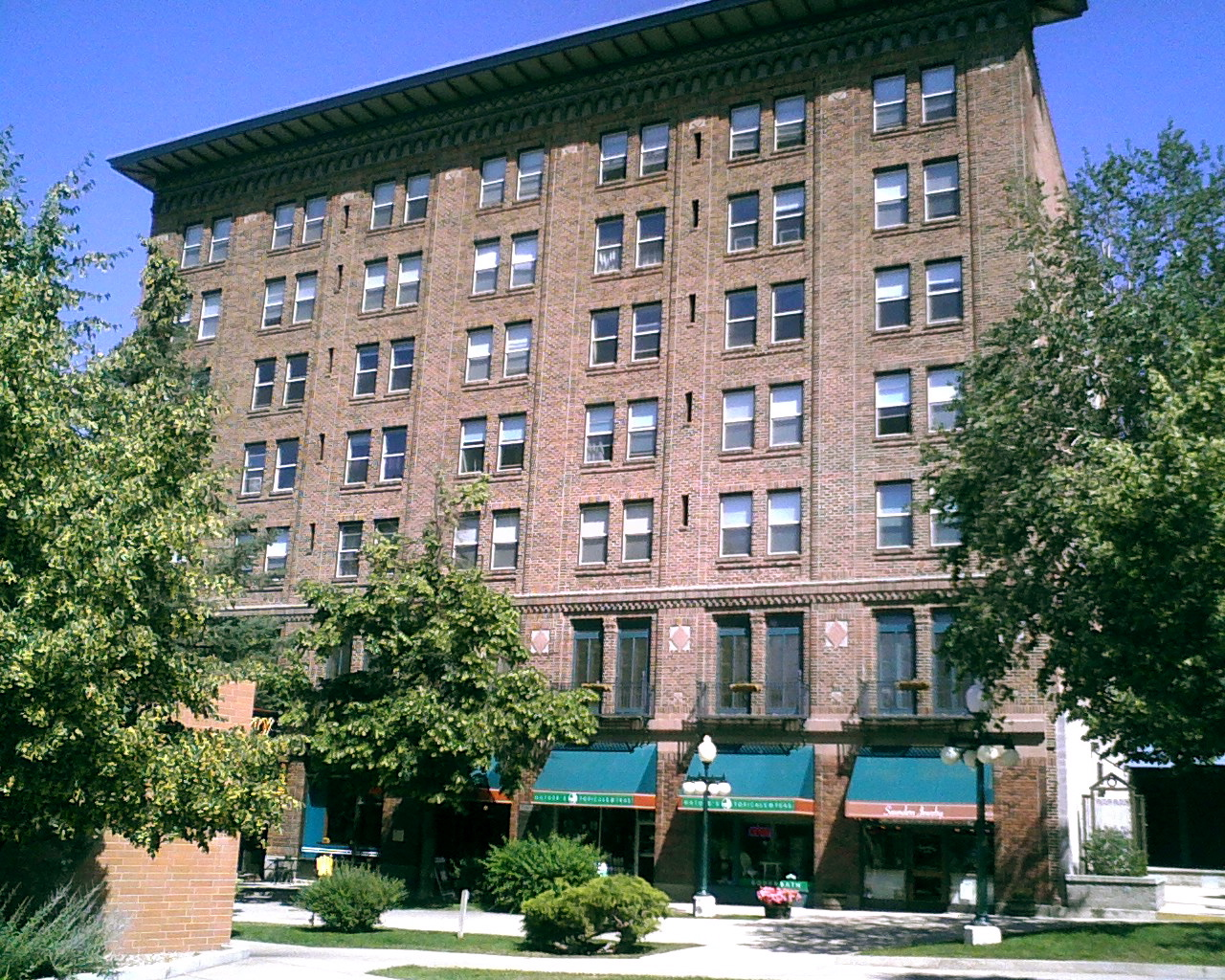
The Placer Hotel, designed by Carsley.

Carsley established his own architectural practice in Helena, Montana, in 1911. He designed the Confederate Memorial Fountain in Hill Park in 1916. Commissioned by the United Daughters of the Confederacy, it was one of few Confederate memorials in the Northwestern United States.

With Gilbert, Carsley designed the masterplan of the campus of the University of Montana in 1917. He also designed the gymnasium and the forestry building in 1922, and Corbin Hall in 1927. With Gilbert, he also designed Helena's Montana Club.

Additionally, Carsley's architectural drawings at the Montana Historical Society Library show that he designed Helena's Placer Hotel, which is listed on the National Register of Historic Places as a contributing property to the Helena Historic District.

== Death ==
Carsley died on July 4, 1933.
