= Pine Bluff Confederate Monument =

- Formerly listed on the U.S. National Register of Historic Places
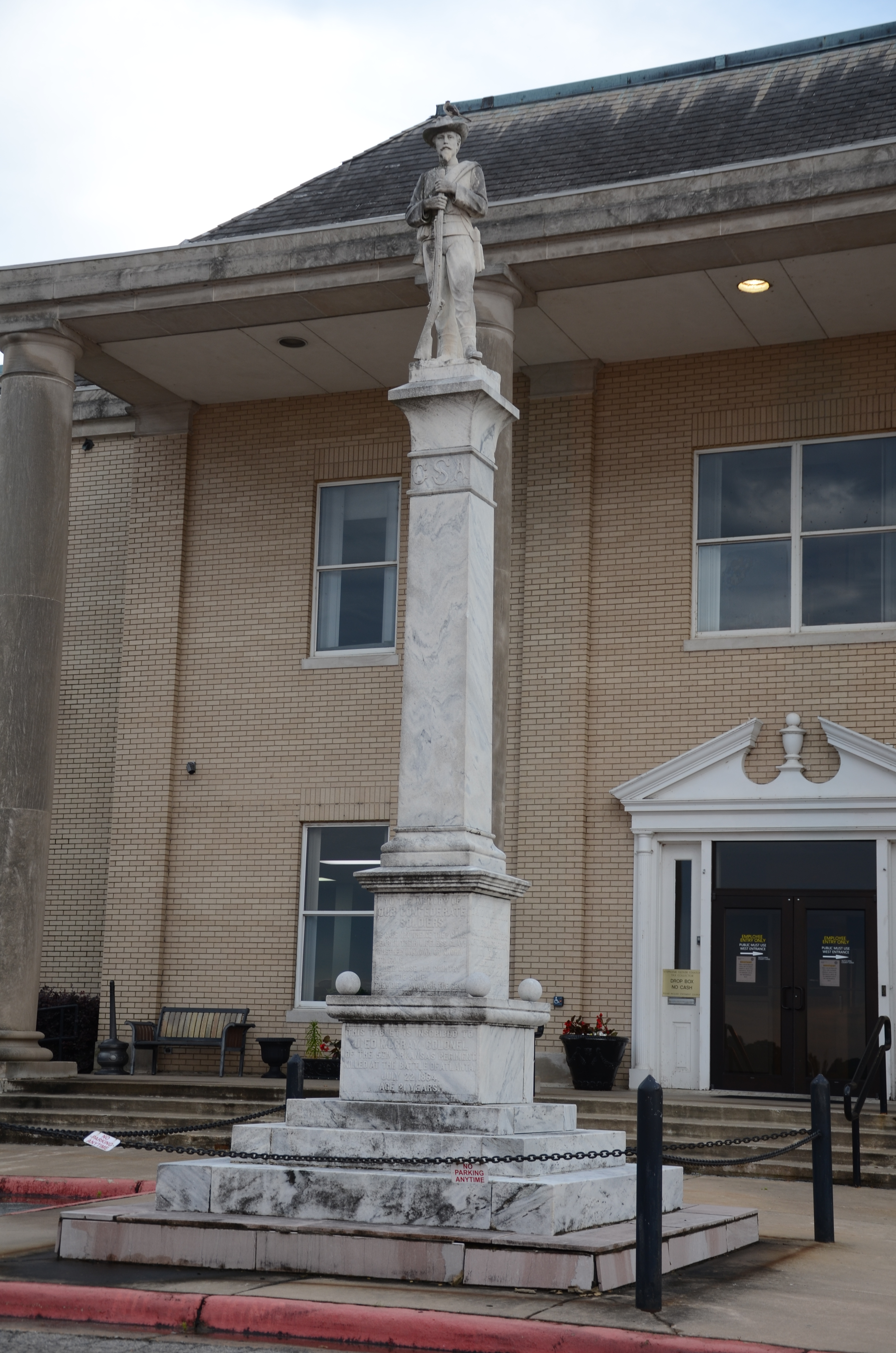
- The monument in 2016

- Location within Arkansas Location within the United States
- Location: North side of Jefferson Cty. Courthouse, jct. of Barraque and Main Sts., Pine Bluff, Arkansas
- Coordinates: 34°13′49″N 92°0′11″W
- Area: less than one acre
- Built: 1910
- Built by: McNeel Marble Co.
- Architectural style: Classical Revival
- MPS: Civil War Commemorative Sculpture MPS
- NRHP reference No.: 96000464

Significant dates
- Added to NRHP: April 26, 1996
- Removed from NRHP: May 12, 2021

The Pine Bluff Confederate Monument has long been located in front of the Jefferson County courthouse, at Barraque and Main Streets in Pine Bluff, Arkansas. It depicts a standing Confederate Army soldier, holding a rifle whose butt rests on the ground. The statue, built out of Georgia marble by the McNeel Marble Company, stands on a stone base 15 feet (4.6 m) in height and 10 by 10 feet (3.0 m × 3.0 m) at the base. It was placed in 1910 by the local chapter of the United Daughters of the Confederacy.

The monument was listed on the National Register of Historic Places in 1996. On June 20, 2020, the monument was removed from the Jefferson County courthouse as part of a cooperative agreement between County Judge Gerald Robinson and the United Daughters of the Confederacy. The statue was then moved to an undisclosed location for storage where it can be cleaned and repaired.

== See also ==
- List of monuments and memorials removed during the George Floyd protests
- National Register of Historic Places listings in Jefferson County, Arkansas
