= Confederate Memorial Fountain (Helena, Montana) =

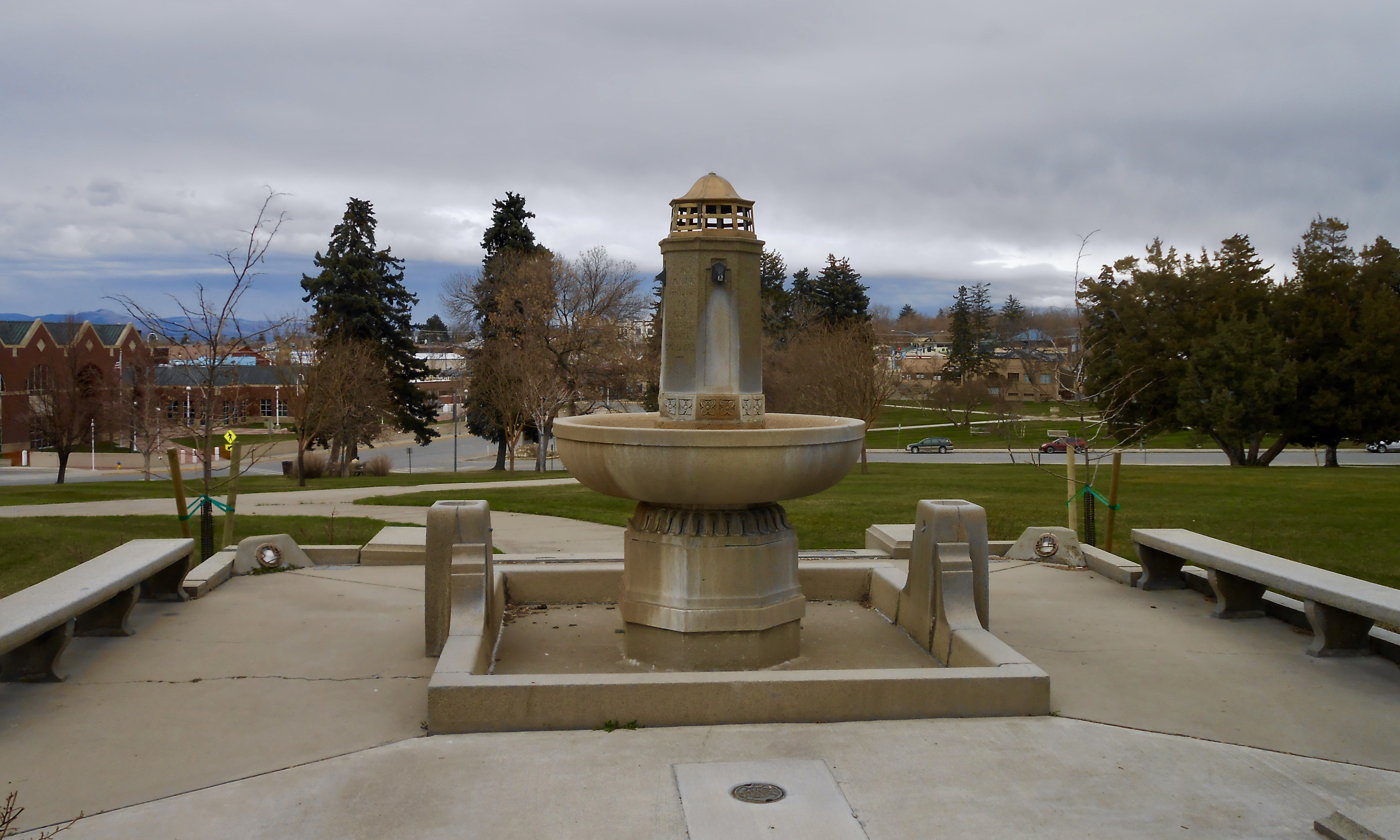
- The memorial in April 2017

- Location within Montana Location within the United States

General information
- Type: Fountain
- Location: Hill Park, Helena, Montana, United States
- Coordinates: 46°35′36″N 112°02′24″W
- Completed: 1916

Design and construction
- Architect: George H. Carsley

The Confederate Memorial Fountain was a historic fountain in Helena, Montana, and one of the very few monuments to The Confederacy located in the Northwestern United States. Erected in Hill Park in 1916, the fountain was removed in 2017. It was replaced by a new fountain, called the Equity Fountain, in 2020.

== History ==
The fountain was commissioned in 1915 by the Winnie Davis Chapter of United Daughters of the Confederacy. The project was approved by the City of Helena Council, through its "Special Committee on the Great Northern Park" (prior name of Hill Park), as reported verbally May 3, 1915 by Alderman Riddell. It was designed by architect George H. Carsley, and built of Montana granite. Its dedication was on September 5, 1916: "The speaker lauded the present-day American spirit, a spirit of union with no feeling between the old north and south, which caused such bitterness and sorrow years ago. Both sides are now engaged in building up a better country to live in, making their homes more comfortable, their cities more beautiful." "...I present this fountain to the city of Helena as a token of our esteem toward our new home.”

The fountain's two inscriptions read: "A Loving Tribute to Our Confederate Soldiers," and "By the Daughters of the Confederacy in Montana, A.D. 1916." It was renovated in 1971, and again in 2008. Its original installation correlated in time to an increase in activity by the Ku Klux Klan and similar organizations, including increased activity in Helena.

The fountain was the only monument to the Confederacy located in the Northwestern United States. In the region, a few other place names and one dam included the name "Confederate," plus one elementary school in Washington State was named after Robert E. Lee

In July 2015, in the wake of the Charleston church shooting, some city officials considered renaming it as the "Civil War Memorial fountain". The Lewis & Clark County Heritage Tourism Council suggested they should keep the historic name and contextualize its establishment. Helena Mayor Jim Smith also supported keeping the historic name. By August, a draft proposal for sign language that contextualized the fountain was presented. It was to explain that Confederate memorials were tools in “the South’s quest for vindication after the Civil War.” By October 2015, the counsel agreed to add a sign, but Smith turned down the suggestion to add a disclaimer on the grounds that it was unnecessary. Nevertheless, by January 2016, city officials discussed adding a sign using revised language drafted by the Montana Historical Society containing a disclaimer about the Ku Klux Klan and white supremacy.

Ultimately, the council realized that length of a contextualizing statement in text large enough to be legible would result in a massive sign. So the project was put on hold and no sign was actually designed.

== Removal ==
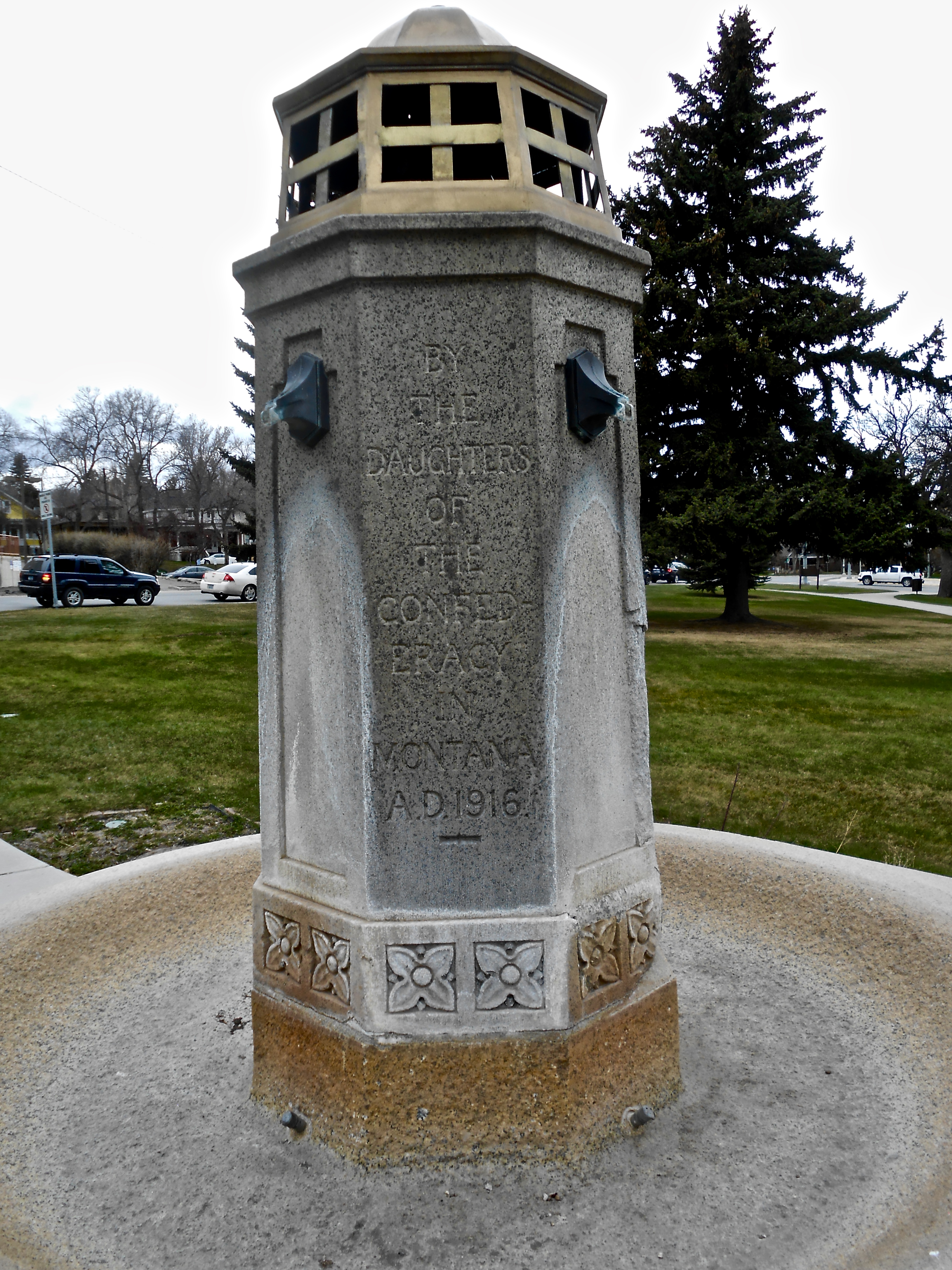
Detail of fountain and inscription

In August 2017, in the wake of the 2017 Unite the Right rally in Charlottesville, Virginia, members of the Native American caucus in the Montana House of Representatives and the Montana Senate sent a letter asking the City of Helena to remove the fountain. A similar letter in support of removal was sent by seven Helena-area Democratic legislators.

In the debate that followed, questioning removal, Pam Attardo, Lewis and Clark County's historic preservation officer, who had created the original draft for a contextualizing statement in 2015, argued that the fountain was not "a symbol of hatred itself" as opposed to the Confederate flag. Bruce Whittenberg, a former newspaper publisher and the director of the Montana Historical Society, argued that the fountain should not be removed, as it could be used "as a teachable moment." Chere Jiusto, the executive director of Montana Preservation Alliance, suggested it should be moved to "a setting where people can learn from our history."

Citing concerns that the fountain could become a rallying point for protests and conflict, as happened with Confederate monuments elsewhere, the city commission asked the city manager to remove the fountain, and it was taken out of the park on August 18, 2017. The removal was attended by 15–20 protesters, some of whom had spent the night in the park. Some protesters carried Confederate, Gadsden, Montana and US flags. Two protesters in their sixties were arrested for obstructing the work of the crew removing the fountain.

That fall, after 16 years as mayor, Smith lost his re-election bid to challenger Wilmot Collins, a Liberian-American immigrant, who became the first person of color to serve as mayor of Helena since the city was incorporated. Likewise, the City Commission races, also non-partisan, were swept by Progressive candidates.

== Replacement ==
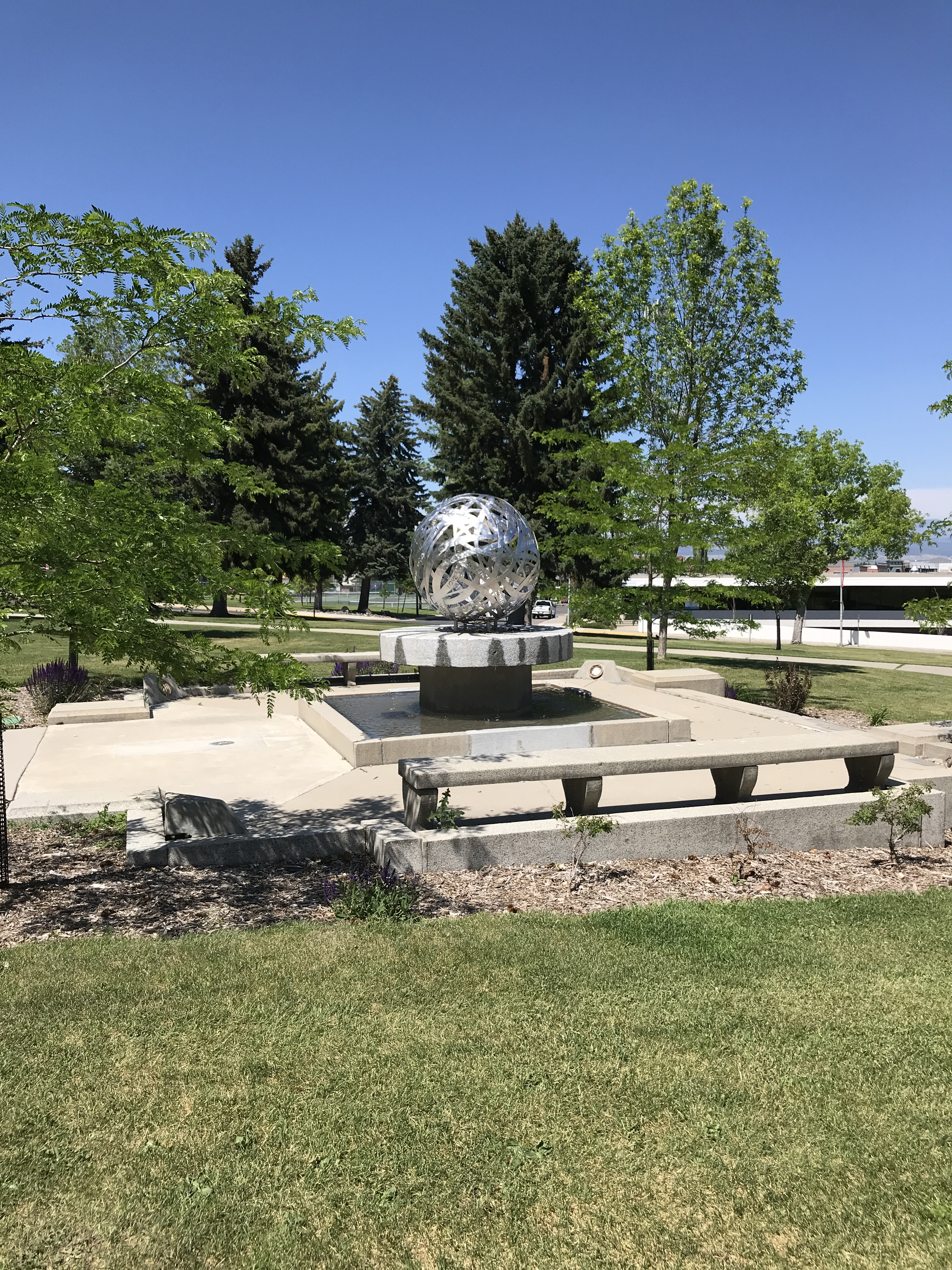
Equity Fountain

In 2019, the City Commission voted unanimously to replace the fountain with a new design. The old fountain was replaced by the Equity Fountain on April 27, 2020. Helena resident Ron Waterman organized the community fundraising campaign, and managed the process of selecting the artist who was commissioned to create the Equity Fountain.

As of September 2021, the original Confederate fountain remains in storage at an undisclosed location. The United Daughters of the Confederacy have asked that it be returned to them so that they may relocate it at a place of their choosing. However, as of September 2021 no action has been taken on this request.

== See also ==
- 1916 in art
- List of Confederate monuments and memorials
- Removal of Confederate monuments and memorials
- List of monuments erected by the United Daughters of the Confederacy
