= American Bronze Company =

The American Bronze Company a.k.a. American White Bronze Company was a company that produced and sold through trade catalogs, zinc (known as “white bronze”) statues, and memorials. It was founded in about 1885, initially as a subsidiary of the Monumental Bronze Company. In 1892, the foundry, owned by Paul Cornell, was located in Grand Crossing, Illinois where Cornell owned a watch company. Around 1900 the company moved to Chicago. The firm is best known for producing cemetery monuments and Civil War monuments, for both the Union and Confederate causes.

“In the wake of the American Civil War, memorials to citizen soldiers who died during the conflict proliferated across the national landscape. Many of these monuments were replicated over and over using available mechanical processes to reproduce sculpture.” The American Bronze Company produced many of them.

The company, by then known as the American Art Bronze Foundry closed up during World War II.

== Selected works ==
- Hall County Confederate Monument, Gainesville, Georgia, 1909
