= Confederate Memorial (Wilmington, North Carolina) =

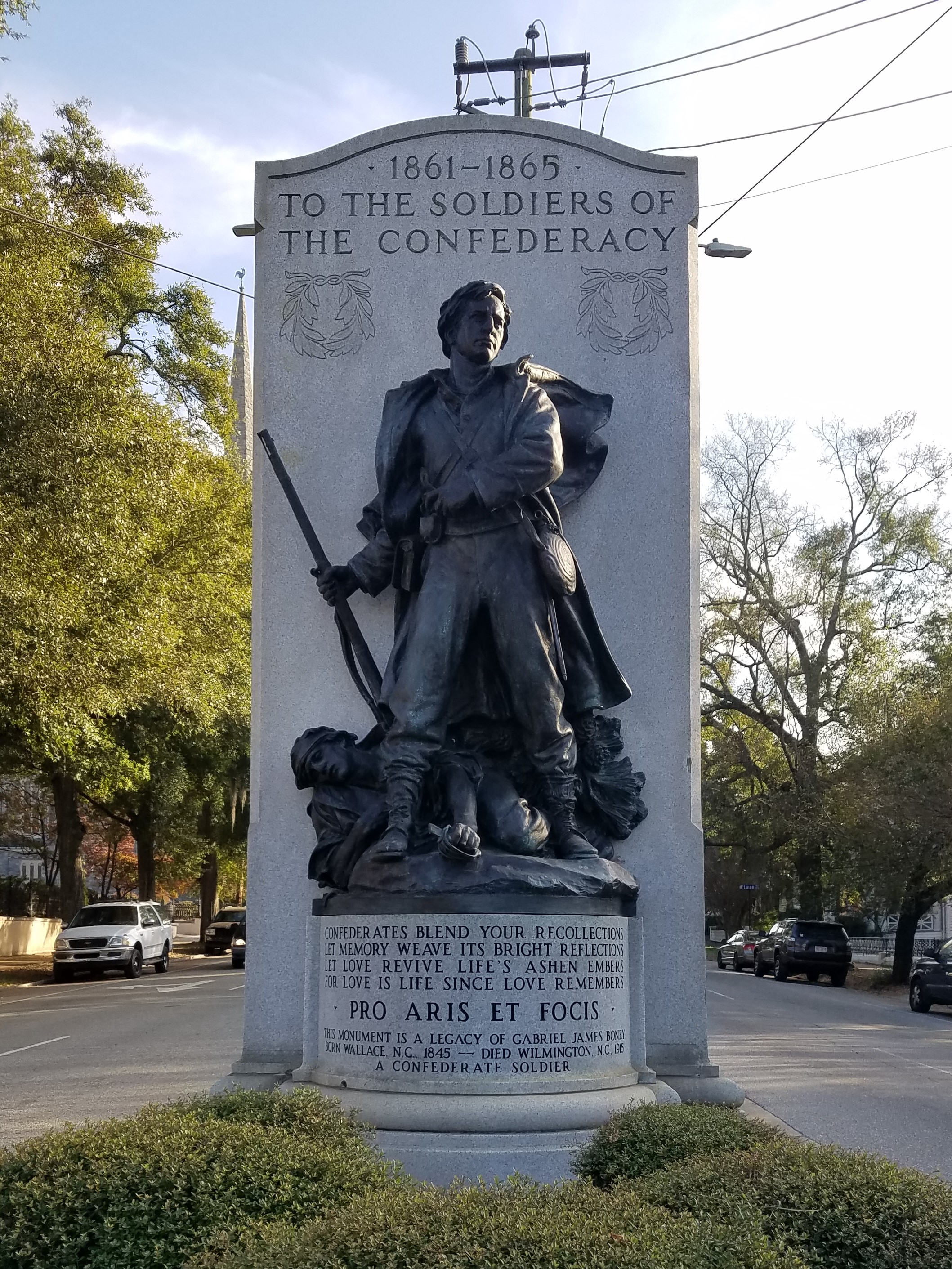
- The memorial, before its dismantling and covering in June 2020. Note the missing bayonet.
- Interactive map of Confederate Memorial
- Location: Wilmington, North Carolina
- Coordinates: 34°14′03.44″N 77°56′45.2″W
- Designer: Henry Bacon and Francis Herman Packer
- Material: Bronze and granite
- Completion date: 1924
- Dedicated to: The Soldiers of the Confederacy
- Dismantled date: 2020

The Confederate Memorial was erected in 1924 by the estate of veteran Gabriel James Boney, the United Daughters of the Confederacy, and a Confederate veterans association in downtown Wilmington, North Carolina. In August 2021, the City of Wilmington removed it from public land and stored it, awaiting the UDC chapter to take possession.

The memorial is a 40-foot, 11-ton stele of white granite and a granite pedestal. Upon the pedestal was placed a bronze sculpture of two soldiers. One soldier, standing with a rifle, protects a wounded soldier holding a broken sword.

It was sited on the median of a busy street near Wilmington's downtown nightlife district. The memorial has a history of being struck by vehicles and as a target for vandals. Motor vehicles have so damaged the memorial that its granite stele and pedestal have been completely replaced with new stone twice—in 1954 and in 1999.

On the pedestal is an inscription in verse. The lines are a rewriting in Confederate terms of an unrelated Canadian poem from the 1870s, "'Tis Christmas".

In 2020, the memorial became a flashpoint of demonstrations against police brutality following the murder of George Floyd.

In the early morning hours of June 25, 2020, the City of Wilmington removed the statue, citing public safety and protection of historical relics. By June 30, the city government had covered the stele and pedestal with a black shroud, obscuring the inscriptions. The removal of the statue was coincident with the announcement by the city government that three police officers had been fired for "brutally racist" conversations recorded on official police equipment.

A few weeks later, the black canvas was covered with khaki-colored canvas, a more neutral color that a city official said was less distracting to drivers.

The city government did not reveal the storage location. On August 2, 2021, the City Council approved an agreement with Cape Fear 3, United Daughters of the Confederacy to permanently remove the monument from public land.

== Donor ==
Gabriel James Boney had been a soldier in Company H, 40th North Carolina Regiment during the American Civil War. He returned to Wilmington after the war and became a wealthy mill owner. He was elected a city alderman and later to the state General Assembly. He was active in a Confederate veteran's association in Wilmington. He never married and had no children. Upon his death in 1915, he left $25,000 ($796,000 in 2025 dollars) to be used "for a suitable memorial to the Confederate soldier."

== Artists ==
=== Henry Bacon ===
The monument was designed by Henry Bacon, who had been the principal designer of the Lincoln Memorial.

He spent much of his youth in Wilmington and is buried there.

=== Francis Herman Packer ===
The statue was sculpted by Francis Herman Packer, a native of Germany who lived on Long Island, New York, and was a student of Augustus Saint-Gaudens.

A decade earlier, Packer had been hired by a United Daughters of Confederacy chapter in Wilmington to sculpt the Confederate George Davis Monument (removed, August 2021), located one block to the north and dedicated in 1911.

== Lost cause inscriptions ==
=== On the stele ===
==== Obverse ====
1861–1865
To the Soldiers of the Confederacy

==== Reverse ====
Erected by a Committee under the
testator's Will representing the
Daughters of the Confederacy, the
Confederate Veterans Association
and his Executor

MCMXXIV

=== On the pedestal ===
Confederates blend your recollections
Let memory weave its bright reflections
Let love revive life's ashen embers
For love is life since love remembers
PRO ARIS ET FOCIS
This monument is a legacy of Gabriel James Boney
Born Wallace, NC 1846 – Died Wilmington, NC 1915

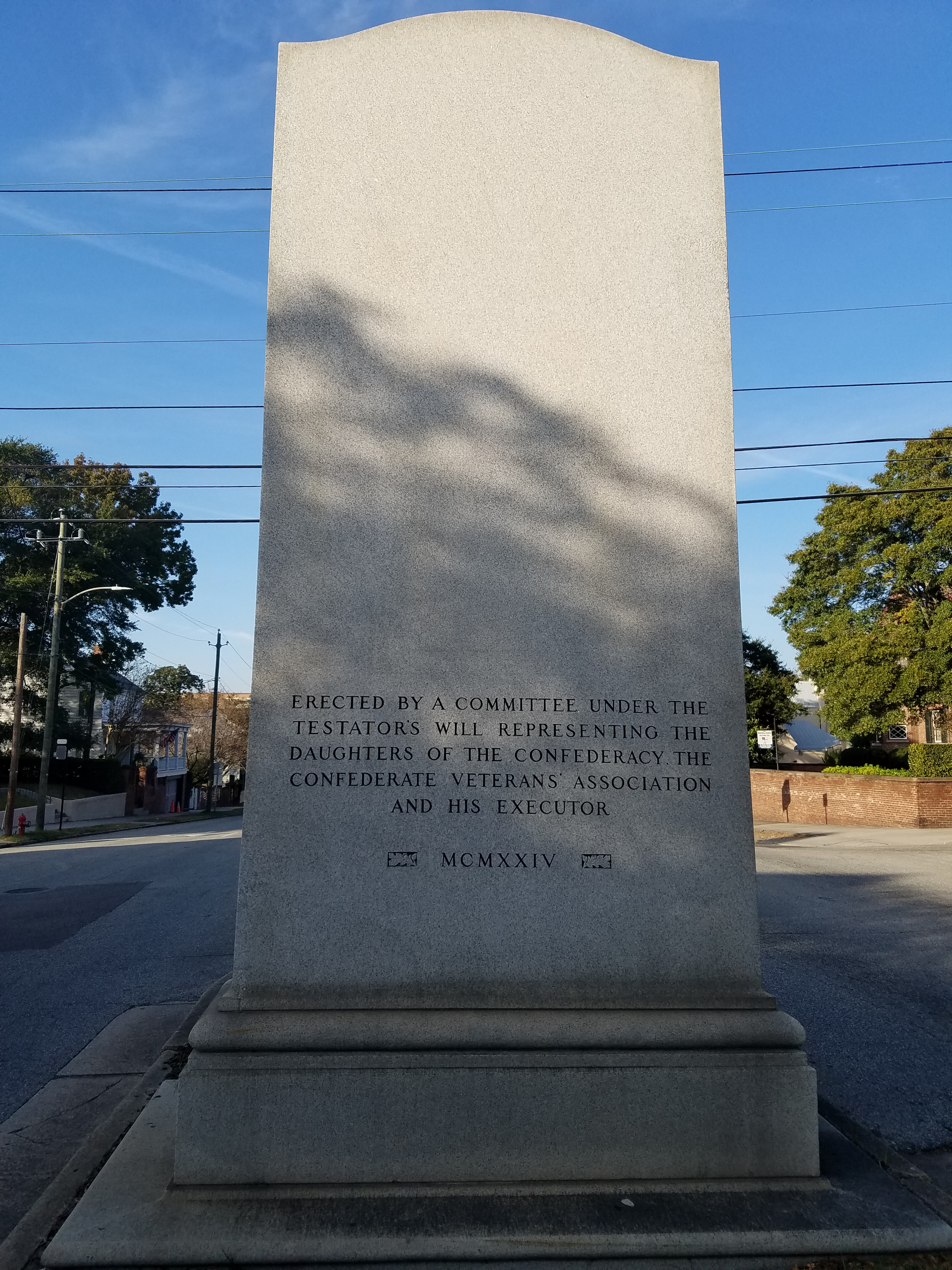
The reverse of the memorial, before its covering with a black shroud in June 2020

=== "Confederates blend your recollections" ===
The inscription is a rewriting of a poem about Christmas to suit Confederate memorial needs.

The poem was printed in The Canadian Monthly's January 1876 issue, more than 40 years before planning on the monument began. The author was Anglo-Irish diplomat Frederick Hamilton-Temple-Blackwood, 1st Marquess of Dufferin and Ava. Dufferin had no involvement with the American Civil War. Between 1860 and 1864, he was assigned to a diplomatic posting in Syria, and through the remainder of the 1860s served as Britain's Under-Secretary of State for India. At the time the poem was written, Dufferin was Governor-General of Canada.

CHRISTMAS

by the Earl of Dufferin

'Tis Christmas Day!

To one another

I hear men say—

Alas! my brother!

Its wind blows bitter,

Our Christmas suns

No longer glitter

As former ones!—

If this be so,

Then let us borrow

From long ago

Surcease of sorrow;—

Let dead Yules lend

Their bright reflections,

Let fond friends blend

Their recollections;—

Let Love revive

Joy's ashen embers,

For Love is Life

Since love remembers.

=== Pro Aris Et Focis ===
The motto Pro Aris Et Focis translates from Latin as "For Altars and Hearths".

The motto has been used for centuries mostly by military organizations, and is often transliterated in myth as "for God and Country". (Pro Deo et Patria is an equally ancient and more common Latin motto directly translated as "For God and Country".)

In the context of Lost Cause mythology, "For Altars and Hearths" is intended to place within the public memory the falsehood that the Confederacy did not fight in the American Civil War principally for the preservation of chattel slavery.

Historians suggest that similar monuments erected by the UDC are pieces of a far wider national effort by the UDC and others, decades after the surrender of the confederacy, to insert the false Lost Cause Narrative into the public memory, announce to nonwhites the final defeat of Reconstruction, and to support white supremacy.

== Siting and context ==
The monument was erected in 1924 at the northmost end of the grassy median within the 100 block of South Third Street, at its intersection with Dock Street. The intersection is one block south of the historic crossroads of the city at Third Street and Market Street.

For decades, the monument marked the northern entrance to an elite neighborhood—one built, beginning in the mid-18th century, by the city's wealthiest and most powerful whites.

The nearest home, at 100 South Third Street, was the Elizabeth Bridgers House, a 15,000 square foot mansion constructed in 1905 for the widowed daughter-in-law of Confederate politician Robert Rufus Bridgers.

== Damage, dismantling and removal ==
=== 1954 ===
A motor vehicle knocked the memorial down, cracking the stele and requiring replacement. Ramsey, a supplier from Salisbury provided new granite. The new granite was erected and the Packer sculpture placed upon it at its original location.

=== 1980s ===
On an unknown date during the latter half of decade, the bayonet was damaged and replaced.

=== 1999–2000 ===
In late 1999, a motor vehicle knocked the entire monument from its foundation and onto South Third Street. Two people were hospitalized.

The foundation was cracked and the backdrop tablet was knocked over. The statue was removed for repair and new granite was ordered to replace the broken stone.

Architect Charles Boney told the Wilmington Star-News soon after the collision that he was committed to ensuring the memorial would be repaired and then restored at its original site: "It's a part of my heritage and it's a part of the city's history, so I just want to make sure it's fixed right."

Repairs and new stone were completed. While re-erecting the tablet at the original location, the crane fell. It damaged overhead power lines, parked motor vehicles and a nearby stone wall. The statue and granite pieces were again removed for repair and replacement.

In 2000, after an absence of almost a year and a half, the monument was repaired and restored. They were damaged again as they were being put back into place. That mishap was quickly fixed and the memorial finally erected at its original site.

=== 2003 ===
On an unknown date during that year, an unknown person broke off the bayonet from the rifle held by the Confederate soldier in Packer's statue, and the piece of bronze went missing. The damage went unrepaired for at least 10 years.

In 2013, a descendant relative named Gabriel James Boney said of the damage, "My father [aged 89] would love to see it put back on. It's a priority for him."

=== 2019 ===
In the early hours of July 4, an unknown person threw orange paint on the memorial.

=== 2020 ===
In March, an unknown person placed a white flag of surrender in the statue's hands.

In early June, the words "Black Lives Matter" were painted on the base of the statue.

That same month, during a period of declaration of a state of emergency, the city government blocked public access to the monument with traffic cones and crime scene tape.

In the early hours of June 25, the City of Wilmington removed the statue and covered the remaining tablet and pedestal, along with their inscriptions, with a black shroud.

In September, Wilmington's mayor said that the threat to public safety that conditioned the memorial's dismantling continued. A majority of the Wilmington City Council told a journalist that the disposition of the city's Confederate monuments was not a high priority.

=== 2021 ===
In June, a year after the statue's partial dismantling and covering with a shroud, the city government told The Star-News of Wilmington that there were no plans as to the final disposition of the memorial.

During 2021, the city attorney had been assigned to research ownership and other issues. During that process, Cape Fear 3, United Daughters of the Confederacy approached the city and asserted a claim on the statue. The claim was based on the facts that, at the time, the UDC chapter had commissioned the statue and had sought city permission to erect it on public property using private funds.

The city attorney concurred. In a July 5 letter to the city, Cape Fear 3 requested that the city hold the monument in storage until Cape Fear 3 had made arrangements to take possession. With the statue already in storage, the city agreed to move the pedestal into storage as well.

In August, the City Council approved the agreement. In a statement, the government said the effects of the vote were to permanently remove the monument from public land and avoid litigation.
