= National Register of Historic Places listings in Chariton County, Missouri =

Location of Chariton County in Missouri

This is a list of the National Register of Historic Places listings in Chariton County, Missouri.

This is intended to be a complete list of the properties and districts on the National Register of Historic Places in Chariton County, Missouri, United States. Latitude and longitude coordinates are provided for many National Register properties and districts; these locations may be seen together in a map.

There are 7 properties and districts listed on the National Register in the county.

This National Park Service list is complete through NPS recent listings posted February 20, 2026.

== Current listings ==
	Name on the Register	Image	Date listed	Location	City or town	Description
1	Chariton County Jail and Sheriff's Residence	Chariton County Jail and Sheriff's Residence	January 16, 1997 (#96001597)	305 S. Cherry St. 39°25′58″N 92°56′30″W	Keytesville	
2	Dalton Vocational School Historic District		August 5, 2002 (#02000832)	Junction of 4th St. and Route J 39°24′13″N 92°59′36″W	Dalton	
3	First Presbyterian Church	First Presbyterian Church	November 23, 1977 (#77000802)	Hill and N Park Sts. 39°26′09″N 92°56′13″W	Keytesville	
4	Locust Hill		January 10, 1980 (#80002349)	East of Brunswick on Route Y 39°26′16″N 93°06′37″W	Brunswick	
5	Redding-Hill House	Redding-Hill House	July 29, 1969 (#69000092)	100 W. North St. 39°26′13″N 92°56′12″W	Keytesville	
6	Salisbury Square Historic District	Salisbury Square Historic District	June 11, 2009 (#09000409)	402, 404, 406, 407, 408, 502, 504, 506, and 508 S. Broadway; 39°25′17″N 92°48′05″W	Salisbury	
7	Frabrishous and Sarah A. Thomas House	Frabrishous and Sarah A. Thomas House	June 25, 1999 (#99000744)	302 E. 2nd St. 39°25′22″N 92°47′53″W	Salisbury	

== Former listing ==
	Name on the Register	Image	Date listed	Date removed	Location	City or town	Description
1	Chariton County Courthouse	Chariton County Courthouse	July 19, 1971 (#71001083)	June 6, 1974	State St.	Keytesville	Destroyed by fire August 27, 1973.

== See also ==
- List of National Historic Landmarks in Missouri
- National Register of Historic Places listings in Missouri
