= Price Park =

Chariton County Park

Coordinates: 39°26′05″N 92°56′12″W

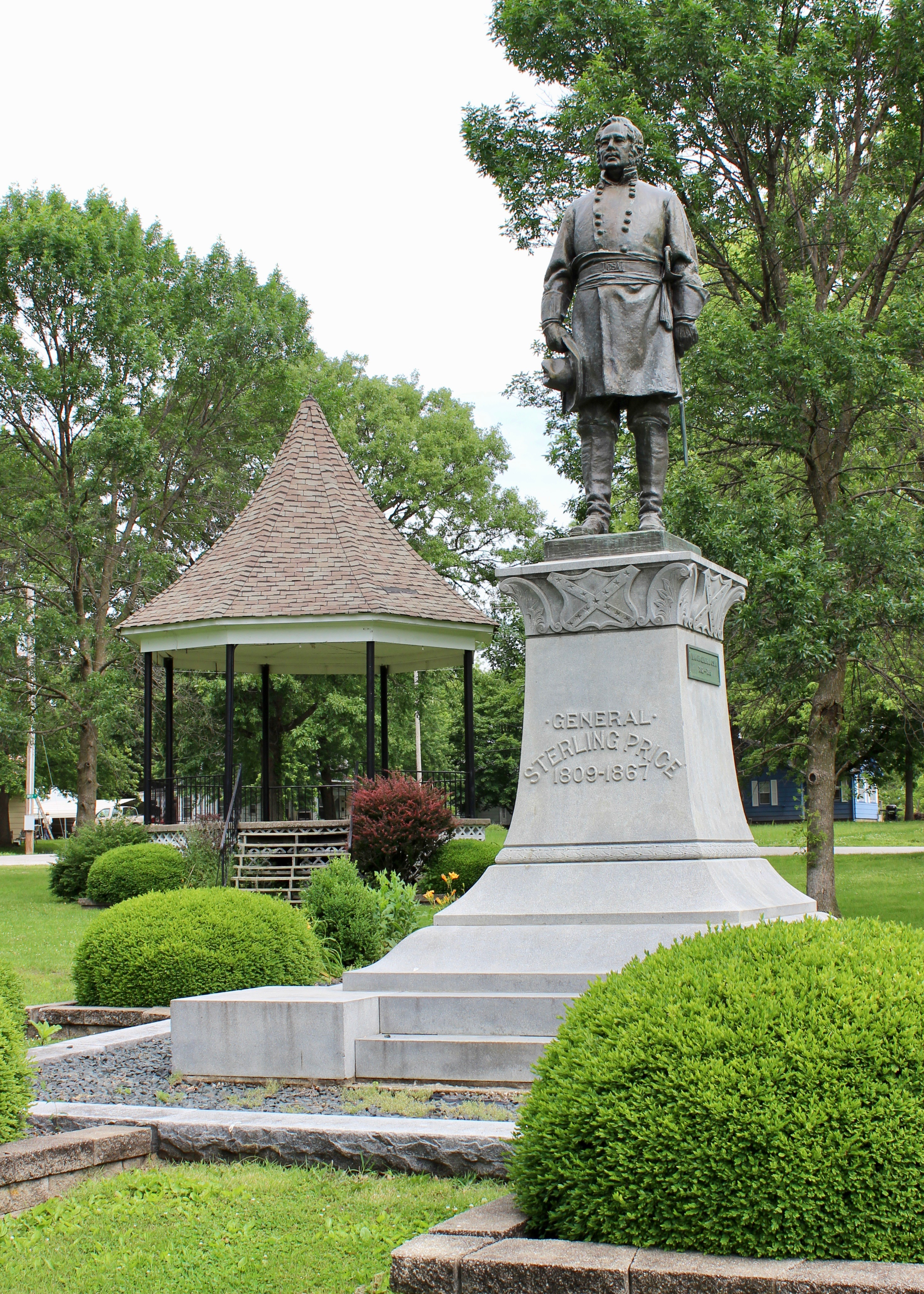
Statue of Sterling Price, Keytesville, Missouri

Price Park is a small city park in Keytesville, Chariton County, Missouri.

== Origin ==
From the late nineteenth century, the city block that became Price Park was the site of the Chariton County jail. In 1906–07, a new jail was built a short distance away, and the old jail was destroyed and the property sold by the county government. The park plat—circa 0.6-acre (2,400 m^{2})—was eventually purchased by a group of "progressive women", who conveyed it to the local chapter of the United Confederate Veterans, who in turn, in 1915, transferred title to the city of Keytesville. By that time, a bandstand had been built on the property, but the area was still encumbered with tree stumps, old concrete, and other debris.

== Statue of Sterling Price ==
In 1911, a campaign by Missouri state representative John D. Taylor (1883–1943), acting at the behest of the local chapter of the United Daughters of the Confederacy (UDC) and other locally prominent women, resulted in a state appropriation of $5,000 to erect a monument to commemorate Sterling Price (1809–1867), a Mexican–American War hero, Missouri governor, and Confederate major general who had owned a hotel and mercantile business in Keytesville from the early 1830s. The UDC contributed $11,000 toward the monument, and the state later voted an additional $2,000.

In 1914, the commission for a statue of Price was awarded to the New York sculptor Allen George Newman (1875–1940), who specialized in military monuments and who had already created the iconic Spanish–American War statue The Hiker. According to Newman's son, the sculptor had noted a man on a New York City street who he felt had the bearing and figure to be a general. By chance, the man had served as an aide to Price and agreed to serve as a model for the statue. The statue and pedestal were fabricated by McNeel Marble Works of Marietta, Georgia, a company that eventually produced 140 Confederate statues. The park was tidied up, and the statue was unveiled on June 17, 1915—without mention of the sculptor.

By the late 1980s, the Price statue was deteriorating, and the granite pedestal was stained. The Friends of Keytesville organized a fund-raising campaign, and the statue was restored by Washington University Technology Associates. A rededication of the statue was held on June 17, 1990, and the statue has since been maintained by the Friends of Keytesville.

== Other memorials ==
In 1993, a stone and plaque memorializing the Potawatomi Trail of Death, which passed through Keytesville in 1838, was dedicated in Price Park. Another monument recognizes former Keytesville mayor Dred Finnell and his wife Lula Fultz Finnell, creators of an educational and community trust for Keytesville.
