= Chariton County Courthouse =

- Formerly listed on the U.S. National Register of Historic Places
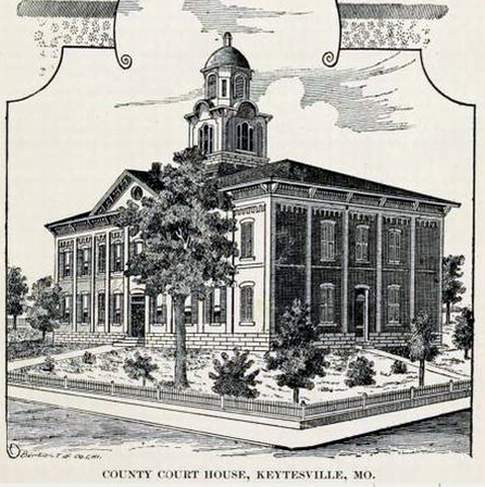
- Location: State St., Keytesville, Missouri
- Area: 9.9 acres (4.0 ha)
- Built: 1866
- Architect: Levi Oldrich
- NRHP reference No.: 71001083

Significant dates
- Added to NRHP: 1971
- Removed from NRHP: January 1, 1974

Chariton County Courthouse was a historic courthouse located at Keytesville, Chariton County, Missouri. It was built in 1866, and was a two-story, white-painted, brick, rectangular building. It was destroyed by fire on August 27, 1973.

It was listed on the National Register of Historic Places in 1971 and delisted in 1974.
