= Salisbury, Missouri =

- City
- Location of Salisbury, Missouri
- Coordinates: 39°25′24″N 92°48′09″W
- Country: United States
- State: Missouri
- County: Chariton
- Founded: April 1, 1867

Area
  - Total: 1.34 sq mi (3.47 km^{2})
  - Land: 1.34 sq mi (3.47 km^{2})
  - Water: 0 sq mi (0.00 km^{2})
- Elevation: 742 ft (226 m)

Population (2020)
  - Total: 1,563
  - Estimate (2023): 1,556
  - Density: 1,167.8/sq mi (450.88/km^{2})
- Time zone: UTC-6 (Central (CST))
  - Summer (DST): UTC-5 (CDT)
- ZIP code: 65281
- Area code: 660
- FIPS code: 29-65450
- GNIS feature ID: 2396529
- Website: salisburymo.net

Salisbury is a city in Chariton County, Missouri, United States. The population was 1,563 at the 2020 census.

== History ==
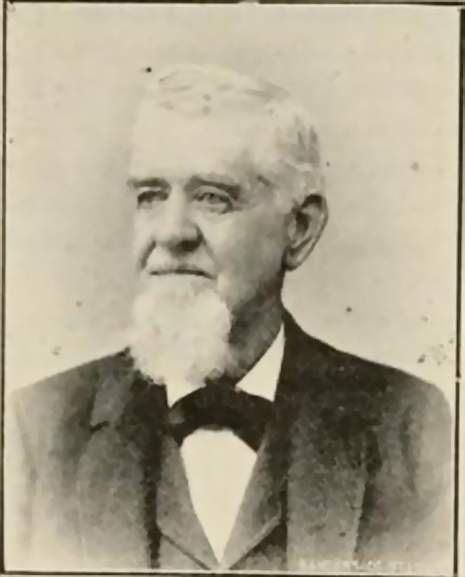
Judge Lucius Salisbury, town founder

The land where Salisbury is now located was first owned by Prier Bibo, a veteran of the War of 1812. In 1819, a tract of 360 acres was granted to Bibo by the U.S. government as a bonus for his military service. Following two intermediate owners, the land was sold for $400 to Judge Lucius Salisbury in 1856. He had surveyors lay out the town plat in 1857, and the town was founded on April 1, 1867.

Salisbury has had a post office since 1863, when Judge Salisbury opened it in his home. He also ran the stagecoach stop from his business, known as "Stop-A-While."

By the 1870 U.S. Census, Salisbury's population was 626. Just two years later, the town was struck by a large tornado. Major fires damaged much of the business district in 1877 and again in 1882. On April 4, 1882, Salisbury was organized and chartered as a fourth-class city under Missouri laws.

Early businesses included two hotels, a flour mill, three tobacco factories, three manufacturers of agricultural equipment and some forty other assorted merchants in the latter 19th century. Residents could visit the Salisbury Opera House, where the town's location on the Wabash rail line came into play, conveniently bringing in notable performers of the time. A published 1896 history of Chariton County lists among the community's businesses and amenities two newspapers, six physicians, a soda-pop factory, cigar factory, and a city-owned power plant for electricity.

The Salisbury Square Historic District and Frabrishous and Sarah A. Thomas House are listed on the National Register of Historic Places.

== Government ==
Salisbury is governed by a mayor-council form of government and is a 4th class city under Missouri classification. City council meetings are held the second Thursday of each month. In 2008 Salisbury's downtown area underwent major sidewalk and road work, with replica early 20th-century-style streetlights installed. Fire protection is provided by the Salisbury Fire Department, a volunteer-based organization. A paid police department provides law enforcement services.

== Education ==
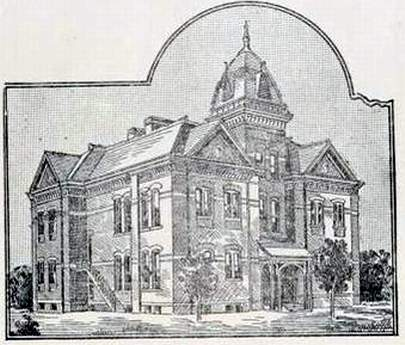
Salisbury's second school building

The Salisbury R-IV school district provides K-12 education to the town of Salisbury and a portion of surrounding Chariton County. A major renovation and expansion project in 2010 and 2011 added more class space to the facility. Along with classrooms, construction of a tornado-safe multipurpose area including a new gymnasium is ongoing. Athletic teams from Salisbury High School have won multiple Missouri state championships: 1997 Class 1A football, 2001 and 2002 Class 2A softball, 2004 Class 1A boys' golf, 2012 Class 1A girls' cross county, and 2012–2013 Class 2A boys' basketball.

The first school in Salisbury opened in April 1867, with 108 students. A fire in 1888 destroyed the first school building and it was replaced by a much larger two-story brick structure. In addition to the public school, Salisbury Academy, opened in 1888, provided for higher education at what today would be considered a junior college level. North Missouri Institute, another college-preparatory school, opened in 1891.

Salisbury has a public library, the Dulany Memorial Library.

== Geography ==
Salisbury is located at the intersection of US Route 24 and Missouri Route 129. Keytesville is approximately seven miles to the west and Clifton Hill is about seven miles to the east in adjacent Randolph County along Route 24. The Middle Fork of the Little Chariton River flows past the southeast side of the city.

According to the United States Census Bureau, the city has a total area of 1.33 square miles (3.44 km^{2}), all land.

=== Climate ===
Climate data for Salisbury, Missouri (1991–2020 normals, extremes 1946–present)
Month	Jan	Feb	Mar	Apr	May	Jun	Jul	Aug	Sep	Oct	Nov	Dec	Year
Record high °F (°C)	75 (24)	81 (27)	91 (33)	93 (34)	97 (36)	104 (40)	114 (46)	107 (42)	103 (39)	95 (35)	82 (28)	73 (23)	114 (46)
Mean daily maximum °F (°C)	37.1 (2.8)	42.5 (5.8)	53.9 (12.2)	65.1 (18.4)	75.0 (23.9)	83.9 (28.8)	87.8 (31.0)	86.7 (30.4)	80.0 (26.7)	68.0 (20.0)	53.9 (12.2)	41.9 (5.5)	64.6 (18.1)
Daily mean °F (°C)	27.7 (−2.4)	32.4 (0.2)	43.0 (6.1)	53.8 (12.1)	64.4 (18.0)	73.8 (23.2)	77.4 (25.2)	75.8 (24.3)	68.0 (20.0)	56.0 (13.3)	43.4 (6.3)	32.8 (0.4)	54.0 (12.2)
Mean daily minimum °F (°C)	18.3 (−7.6)	22.3 (−5.4)	32.1 (0.1)	42.6 (5.9)	53.7 (12.1)	63.6 (17.6)	67.1 (19.5)	64.8 (18.2)	55.9 (13.3)	44.0 (6.7)	32.9 (0.5)	23.7 (−4.6)	43.4 (6.3)
Record low °F (°C)	−21 (−29)	−21 (−29)	−12 (−24)	15 (−9)	29 (−2)	40 (4)	46 (8)	36 (2)	25 (−4)	20 (−7)	−8 (−22)	−28 (−33)	−28 (−33)
Average precipitation inches (mm)	1.52 (39)	1.84 (47)	2.79 (71)	4.04 (103)	5.15 (131)	5.54 (141)	4.21 (107)	3.64 (92)	3.73 (95)	3.49 (89)	2.43 (62)	1.64 (42)	40.02 (1,017)
Average precipitation days (≥ 0.01 in)	5.3	4.8	7.5	9.6	9.8	8.5	7.9	6.6	6.2	7.3	6.1	5.5	85.1
Source: NOAA

== Demographics ==
Historical population
Census	Pop.	Note	%±
1870	626		—
1880	908		45.0%
1890	1,672		84.1%
1900	1,847		10.5%
1910	1,834		−0.7%
1920	1,757		−4.2%
1930	1,768		0.6%
1940	1,759		−0.5%
1950	1,676		−4.7%
1960	1,787		6.6%
1970	1,960		9.7%
1980	1,975		0.8%
1990	1,881		−4.8%
2000	1,726		−8.2%
2010	1,618		−6.3%
2020	1,563		−3.4%
U.S. Decennial Census

=== 2020 census ===
As of the 2020 census, Salisbury had a population of 1,563. The median age was 39.2 years. 26.3% of residents were under the age of 18 and 22.0% of residents were 65 years of age or older. For every 100 females there were 86.3 males, and for every 100 females age 18 and over there were 80.6 males age 18 and over.

0.0% of residents lived in urban areas, while 100.0% lived in rural areas.

There were 663 households in Salisbury, of which 32.0% had children under the age of 18 living in them. Of all households, 47.2% were married-couple households, 14.2% were households with a male householder and no spouse or partner present, and 31.7% were households with a female householder and no spouse or partner present. About 32.3% of all households were made up of individuals and 18.5% had someone living alone who was 65 years of age or older.

There were 794 housing units, of which 16.5% were vacant. The homeowner vacancy rate was 0.4% and the rental vacancy rate was 11.8%.

Racial composition as of the 2020 census
Race	Number	Percent
White	1,472	94.2%
Black or African American	31	2.0%
American Indian and Alaska Native	4	0.3%
Asian	1	0.1%
Native Hawaiian and Other Pacific Islander	0	0.0%
Some other race	1	0.1%
Two or more races	54	3.5%
Hispanic or Latino (of any race)	26	1.7%

=== 2010 census ===
As of the census of 2010, there were 1,618 people, 698 households, and 431 families residing in the city. The population density was 1,216.5 inhabitants per square mile (469.7 inhabitants/km^{2}). There were 830 housing units at an average density of 624.1 units per square mile (241.0 units/km^{2}). The racial makeup of the city was 96.3% White, 2.1% African American, 0.5% Native American, 0.1% Asian, 0.1% from other races, and 0.9% from two or more races. Hispanic or Latino of any race were 0.2% of the population.

There were 698 households, of which 32.1% had children under the age of 18 living with them, 48.1% were married couples living together, 9.6% had a female householder with no husband present, 4.0% had a male householder with no wife present, and 38.3% were non-families. 34.5% of all households were made up of individuals, and 18.8% had someone living alone who was 65 years of age or older. The average household size was 2.31 and the average family size was 2.97.

The median age in the city was 40.2 years. 25.4% of residents were under the age of 18; 8.4% were between the ages of 18 and 24; 20.8% were from 25 to 44; 25.7% were from 45 to 64; and 19.7% were 65 years of age or older. The gender makeup of the city was 46.9% male and 53.1% female.

=== 2000 census ===
As of the census of 2000, there were 1,726 people, 744 households, and 474 families residing in the city. The population density was 493.6 inhabitants per square mile (190.6 inhabitants/km^{2}). There were 847 housing units at an average density of 242.2 units per square mile (93.5 units/km^{2}). The racial makeup of the city was 94.84% White, 4.23% African American, 0.17% Native American, 0.17% Asian, 0.06% from other races, and 0.52% from two or more races. Hispanic or Latino of any race were 0.58% of the population.

There were 744 households, out of which 29.7% had children under the age of 18 living with them, 52.4% were married couples living together, 9.0% had a female householder with no husband present, and 36.2% were non-families. 34.1% of all households were made up of individuals, and 20.4% had someone living alone who was 65 years of age or older. The average household size was 2.30 and the average family size was 2.93.

In the city, the population was spread out, with 24.2% under the age of 18, 6.7% from 18 to 24, 24.9% from 25 to 44, 21.6% from 45 to 64, and 22.7% who were 65 years of age or older. The median age was 42 years. For every 100 females, there were 84.8 males. For every 100 females age 18 and over, there were 81.8 males.

The median income for a household in the city was $30,729, and the median income for a family was $41,389. Males had a median income of $28,988 versus $19,185 for females. The per capita income for the city was $15,163. About 7.1% of families and 10.0% of the population were below the poverty line, including 10.4% of those under age 18 and 9.9% of those age 65 or over.

== Notable person ==
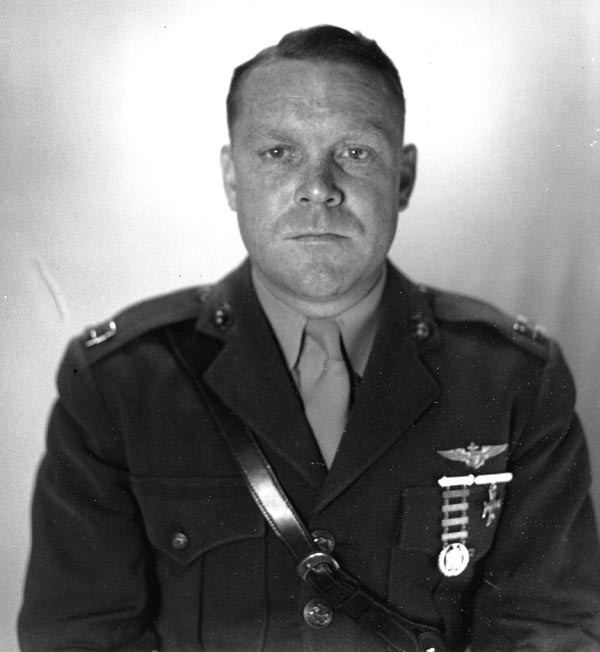
Major Floyd Parks

- Floyd B. Parks, U.S. Marine aviator who earned the Navy Cross posthumously for his actions leading Marine fighter squadron VMF-221 during the Battle of Midway; the U.S. Navy destroyer USS Floyd B. Parks was named in his honor.

== Attractions and events ==
- Salisbury City Park features a playground, horse arena, tennis court, ball field, and picnic area. The city swimming pool is located across the street.
- James C. Philpotts Park, located just south of the city, provides multiple recreation opportunities such as a 9-hole public golf course, playgrounds, walking trails and a small lake. The park also provides a 10-unit campground with electricity, water and sewer services available.
- Two lakes just outside the city limits, Sterling Price Lake and Lake Nehai Tonkayea, provide fishing and boating opportunities.
- Salisbury Steak Festival is held each June, with various games, local entertainment, and a community steak supper.

== Gallery: 19th-century Salisbury ==
Salisbury Academy, a junior college founded in 1888

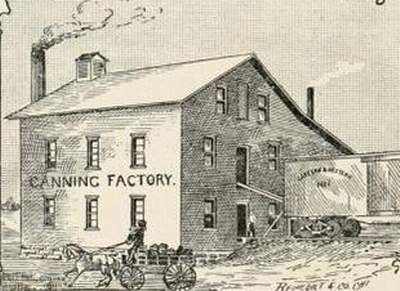
Illustration of the Salisbury Canning Factory

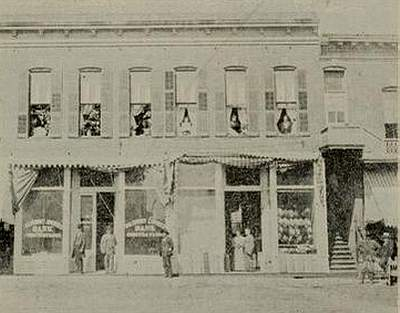
Salisbury Savings Bank and Plattners Dry Goods

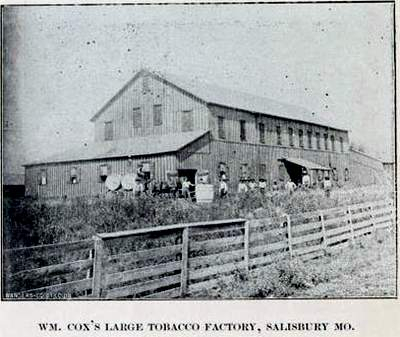
W. M. Cox tobacco factory, Salisbury
