= Dalton, Missouri =

- Village
- Location of Dalton, Missouri
- Coordinates: 39°23′51″N 92°59′31″W
- Country: United States
- State: Missouri
- County: Chariton

Area
  - Total: 0.18 sq mi (0.47 km^{2})
  - Land: 0.18 sq mi (0.47 km^{2})
  - Water: 0 sq mi (0.00 km^{2})
- Elevation: 686 ft (209 m)

Population (2020)
  - Total: 7
  - Density: 38.7/sq mi (14.94/km^{2})
- Time zone: UTC-6 (Central (CST))
  - Summer (DST): UTC-5 (CDT)
- ZIP code: 65246
- Area code: 660
- FIPS code: 29-18118
- GNIS feature ID: 2396676

Dalton is a village in Chariton County, Missouri, United States. The population was 7 at the 2020 census.

== Geography ==
Dalton is located at 39°23′50″N 92°59′28″W (39.397130, -92.991248).

According to the United States Census Bureau, the village has a total area of 0.18 square miles (0.47 km^{2}), all land.

== History of Dalton ==
Lewis and Clark made camp at what would later be known as the Cut-Off on June 12, 1804, and it was here that the expedition met with Pierre Dorion, a man who had reportedly been with the Sioux for 20 years and was thought to have some influence upon them. The Lewis and Clark journal entry describes the Dalton Cut-Off as connected to the Missouri River by a creek.

More than sixty years after the Lewis and Clark Expedition passed through the area—after the end of the Civil War—the village of Dalton was born when the railroad created a need for it. The village was named for William Dalton, who had donated the 40 acres (160,000 m^{2}) and a railroad depot was built for the St. Louis & Pacific line. [note: William Dalton was believed to be the grandfather of Missouri's sitting governor at the time the village was named, but the contributor has not yet found sources to support that claim.]

=== Dalton Vocational School ===
Dalton is best known as the site of the Dalton Vocational School, originally the Barlett Agricultural and Industrial School, also referred to as the "Tuskegee of the Midwest" or "Missouri Tuskegee". It was founded in 1907 by Nathaniel Bruce, a student and disciple of Booker T. Washington. The first permanent building was erected in 1909 after flooding forced a move to higher ground. In 1923, the school received funds from the state legislature to construct a model farm home, trade shop, and hog and poultry houses. Eventually the campus would expand to 123 acres (0.50 km^{2}). Bruce shared Washington's view that a practical education for African American youth was best. The emphasis was on vocational and agricultural training. African American students from a relatively wide geographical area were bussed to Dalton where they studied agriculture, industrial arts, and home economics.

The demonstration farm and school came under the supervision of the University of Missouri College of Agriculture in 1924. Eventually Lincoln University, a then all-Black college in Jefferson City, took control of the school. The Supreme Court's 1954 ruling that schools were to be integrated forced the closing of Dalton Vocational School; the last school year was 1955–1956. Buildings and property were later sold at auction. The campus has sat empty since that time and all but two of the buildings are gone.

=== Recent ===
Large portions of the 1973 Tom Sawyer film were filmed at the Dalton Cut-Off, especially footage that featured shots of Tom and Huck's adventures on the Mississippi River.

In 1979, Dalton resident Rod Skillman was a walk-on for the Missouri football team at defensive tackle and later played professionally for the New Jersey Generals ('83–'84) and Hamilton Tiger-Cats ('84–'92).

As for the village of Dalton today, the decline of the rural economy and flooding have taken their toll. The 1993 flood reduced Dalton to a grain elevator, a post office, two churches, a community center and a few houses. But the small community still celebrates its heritage with the annual Dalton Days festival.

Today, the Dalton Cut-Off is part of what waterfowl enthusiasts call the "Golden Triangle" because it winters an exceptionally large number of birds.

Dalton Vocational School Historic District was listed on the National Register of Historic Places in 2002.

== Demographics ==
Historical population
Census	Pop.	Note	%±
1880	199		—
1890	332		66.8%
1900	223		−32.8%
1910	261		17.0%
1920	398		52.5%
1930	357		−10.3%
1940	342		−4.2%
1950	237		−30.7%
1960	197		−16.9%
1970	135		−31.5%
1980	76		−43.7%
1990	38		−50.0%
2000	27		−28.9%
2010	17		−37.0%
2020	7		−58.8%
U.S. Decennial Census

=== 2010 census ===
As of the census of 2010, there were 17 people, 9 households, and 6 families living in the village. The population density was 94.4 inhabitants per square mile (36.4/km^{2}). There were 18 housing units at an average density of 100.0 per square mile (38.6/km^{2}). The racial makeup of the village was 70.6% White and 29.4% African American.

There were 9 households, of which 22.2% had children under the age of 18 living with them, 55.6% were married couples living together, 11.1% had a male householder with no wife present, and 33.3% were non-families. 33.3% of all households were made up of individuals, and 22.2% had someone living alone who was 65 years of age or older. The average household size was 1.89 and the average family size was 2.17.

The median age in the village was 63.2 years. 11.8% of residents were under the age of 18; 0% were between the ages of 18 and 24; 5.9% were from 25 to 44; 47% were from 45 to 64; and 35.3% were 65 years of age or older. The gender makeup of the village was 58.8% male and 41.2% female.

=== 2000 census ===
As of the census of 2000, there were 27 people, 12 households, and 9 families living in the town. The population density was 152.5 inhabitants per square mile (58.9/km^{2}). There were 24 housing units at an average density of 135.6 per square mile (52.4/km^{2}). The racial makeup of the town was 55.56% White and 44.44% African American. Hispanic or Latino of any race were 11.11% of the population.

There were 12 households, out of which 16.7% had children under the age of 18 living with them, 41.7% were married couples living together, 33.3% had a female householder with no husband present, and 25.0% were non-families. 25.0% of all households were made up of individuals, and 16.7% had someone living alone who was 65 years of age or older. The average household size was 2.25 and the average family size was 2.56.

In the town the population was spread out, with 18.5% under the age of 18, 14.8% from 25 to 44, 33.3% from 45 to 64, and 33.3% who were 65 years of age or older. The median age was 54 years. For every 100 females, there were 58.8 males. For every 100 females age 18 and over, there were 46.7 males.

The median income for a household in the town was $42,500, and the median income for a family was $42,500. Males had a median income of $0 versus $11,250 for females. The per capita income for the town was $19,492. None of the population and none of the families were below the poverty line.
