= First Presbyterian Church (Keytesville, Missouri) =

Historic church in Missouri, United States

- U.S. National Register of Historic Places
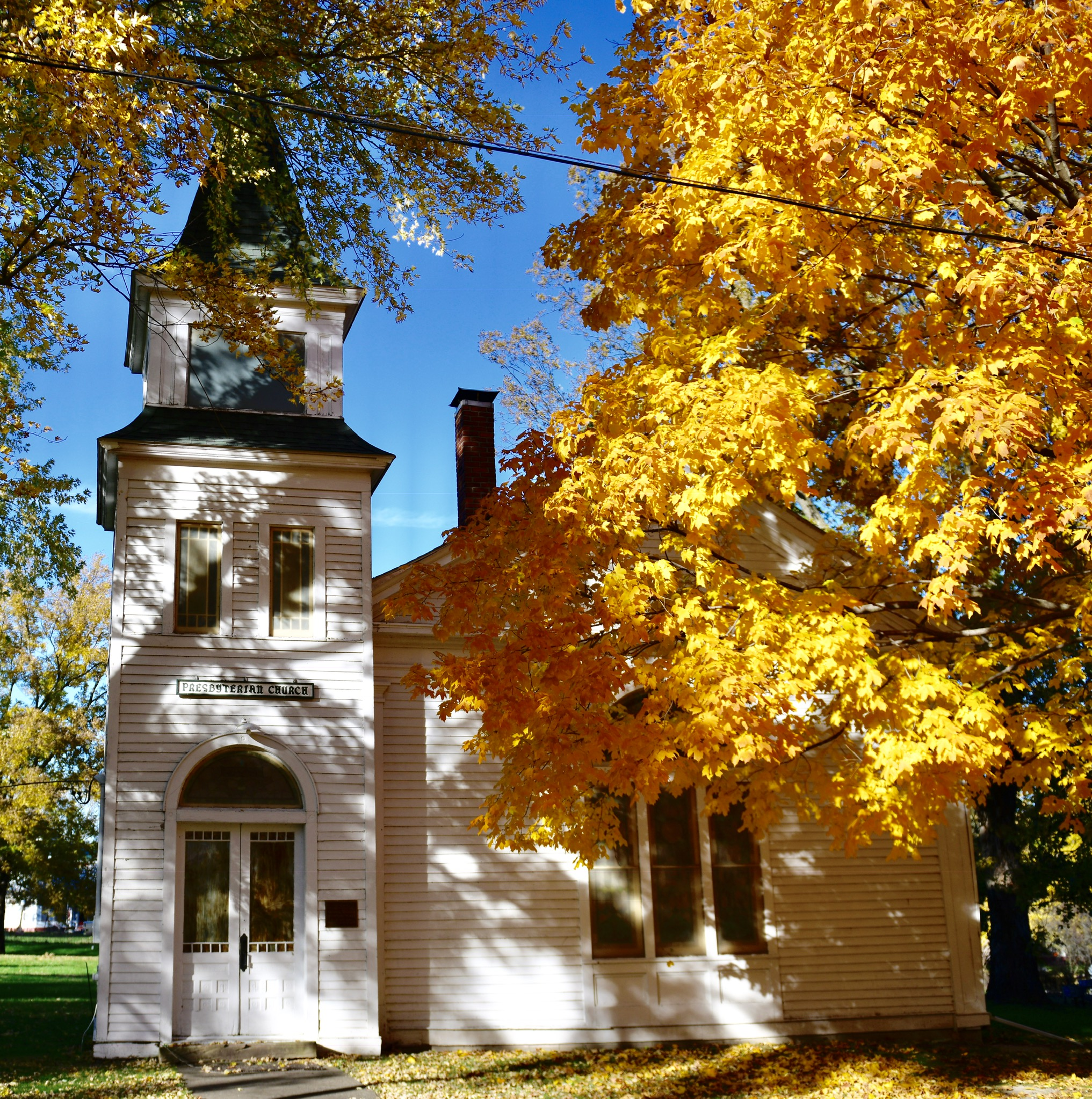

- Location within Missouri Location within the United States
- Location: Hill and East Sts. Keytesville, Missouri
- Coordinates: 39°26′9″N 92°56′13″W
- Area: less than one acre
- Built: 1853
- Architectural style: Classic Revival
- NRHP reference No.: 77000802
- Added to NRHP: November 23, 1977

First Presbyterian Church is a historic Presbyterian church located at Hill and East Streets in Keytesville, Chariton County, Missouri. Built in 1853, it features a one-story Classical Revival style frame building with a turn-of-the-20th-century addition that incorporates elements of Romanesque Revival style. The church is distinguished by its two-story-plus belfry tower.

In 1977, it was listed on the National Register of Historic Places.
