= Dalton Vocational School Historic District =

Historic district in Missouri, United States

- U.S. National Register of Historic Places
- U.S. Historic district
- Location within Missouri Location within the United States
- Location: Junction of 4th St. and Route J, Dalton, Missouri
- Coordinates: 39°24′13″N 92°59′36″W
- Area: 123 acres (50 ha)
- NRHP reference No.: 02000832
- Added to NRHP: August 5, 2002

Dalton Vocational School Historic District, also known as the Bartlett Agricultural and Vocational School Historic District, is a national historic district located near Dalton, Chariton County, Missouri. The district encompasses nine contributing buildings and one contributing site of an African American agricultural and vocational school that served Chariton and surrounding counties during the first half of the 20th century. Plans for the school were initiated in 1905 and after it opened it developed and operated until 1956. Building at the site include the Bartlett Classroom Building (1938), Busch Building (1909), Principals Cottage (c. 1930), Cafeteria (c. 1920), Machine Shop (c. 1920), two sheds, a barn, and a poultry house, along with 123 acres of property.

Nathaniel C. Bruce (1865 - June 27, 1942) was the driving force behind the school's founding. He was born in Virginia and had worked previously at a high school for African Americans in St. Joseph, Missouri. He described plans for it to become the "Tuskegee (Tuskegee Institute) of the West". Plans for the school were met with opposition from white residents who protested. A June 26, 1909 article in The Chillicothe Constitution-Tribune advanced fears the school would bring additional "Negroes" to the area and establish them in the majority. It described plans for the school as being driven by people from St. Joseph.

It was listed on the National Register of Historic Places in 2002. In 2021, a plaque at the Dalton Cemetery was added commemorating Bruce.
