= Salisbury Square Historic District =

Historic district in Missouri, United States

- U.S. National Register of Historic Places
- U.S. Historic district
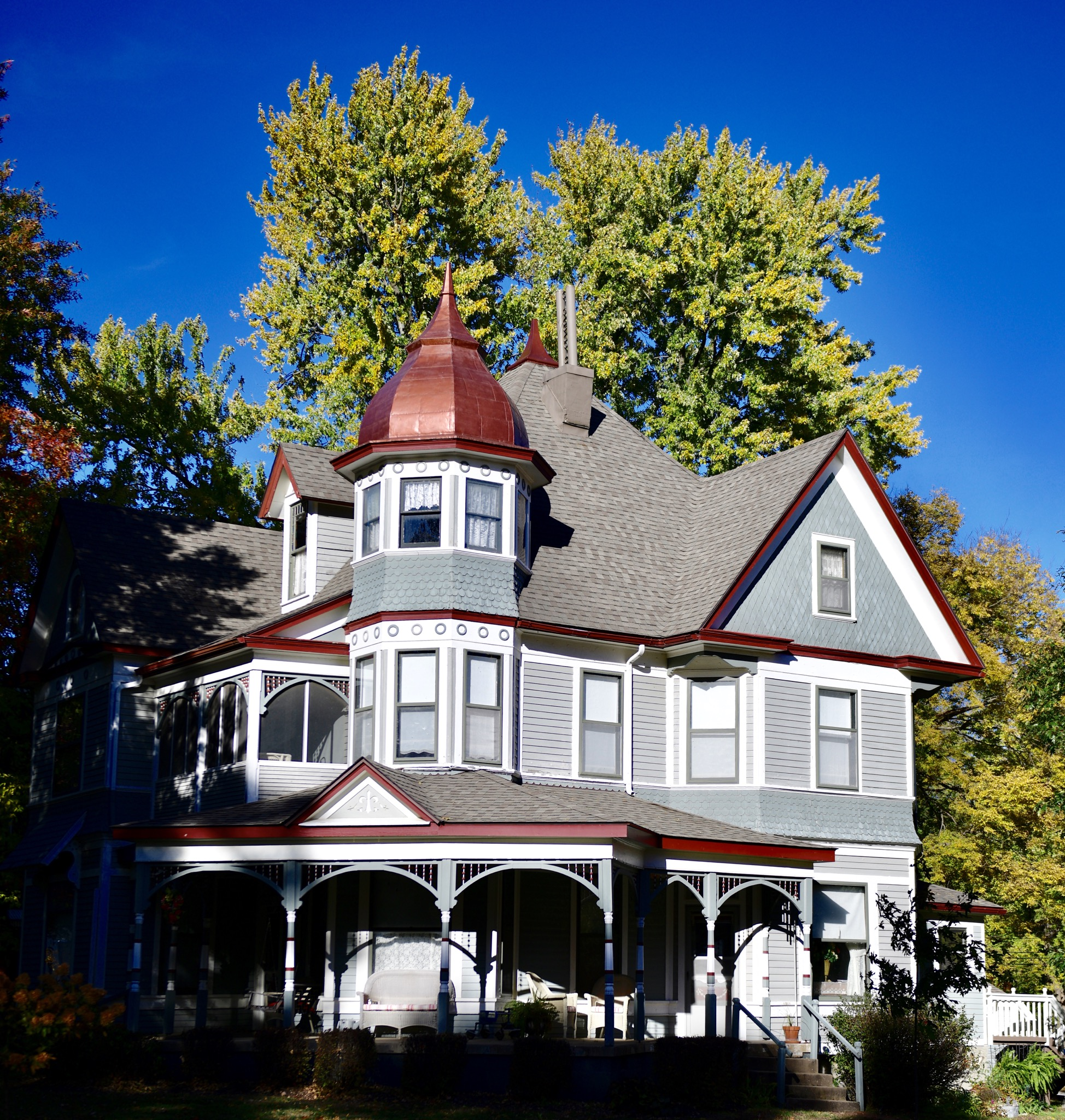
- Dr. J.D. Brummell House (1898)

- Location within Missouri Location within the United States
- Location: 402, 404, 406, 407, 408, 502, 504, 506, 508 S. Broadway, Salisbury, Missouri
- Coordinates: 39°25′17″N 92°48′5″W
- Area: 4 acres (1.6 ha)
- Architectural style: Queen Anne, Prairie School
- NRHP reference No.: 09000409
- Added to NRHP: April 9, 2009

Salisbury Square Historic District is a national historic district located at Salisbury, Chariton County, Missouri. The district encompasses eight contributing buildings in an exclusively residential section of Salisbury. It developed between about 1870 and 1916, and includes representative examples of Queen Anne and Prairie School style architecture. The district reflects a collection of intact Queen Anne houses that remain notable in form and design.

It was listed on the National Register of Historic Places in 2009.
