= Redding–Hill House =

Historic house in Missouri, United States

- U.S. National Register of Historic Places
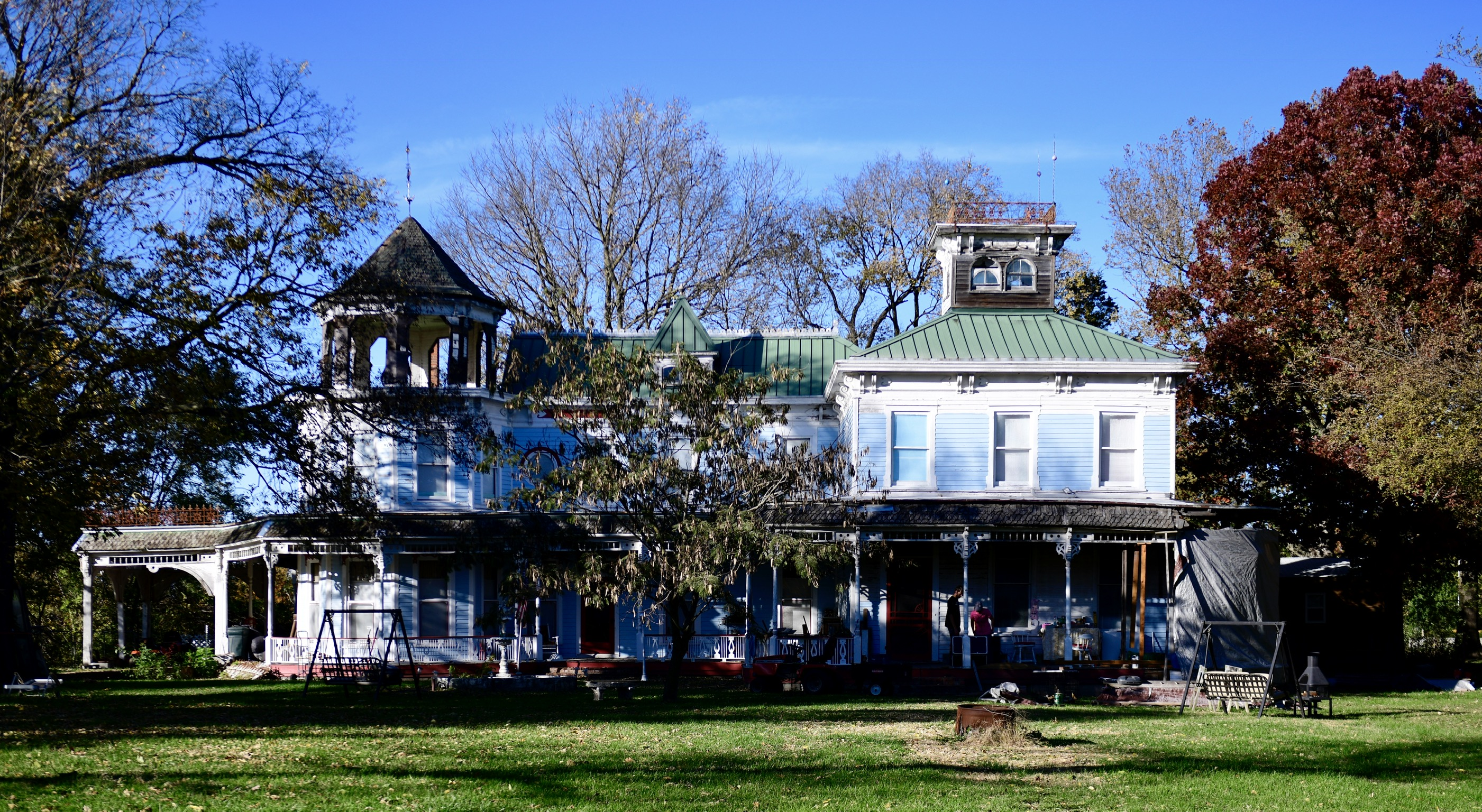

- Location within Missouri Location within the United States
- Location: 100 W. North St. Keytesville, Missouri
- Coordinates: 39°26′13″N 92°56′12″W
- Area: less than one acre
- Built: 1832
- NRHP reference No.: 69000092
- Added to NRHP: July 29, 1969

Redding–Hill House, also known as Hill Homestead and House of Seven Hills, is a historic home located at Keytesville, Chariton County, Missouri. The original section was built in 1832, as a simple rectangular one story frame house. Additions to the building occurred over a period of about 44 years to about 1876 to become a rambling, ten room, wood-frame structure and is considered "an architectural curiosity."

It was listed on the National Register of Historic Places in 1969.
