= Frabrishous and Sarah A. Thomas House =

Historic house in Missouri, United States

- U.S. National Register of Historic Places
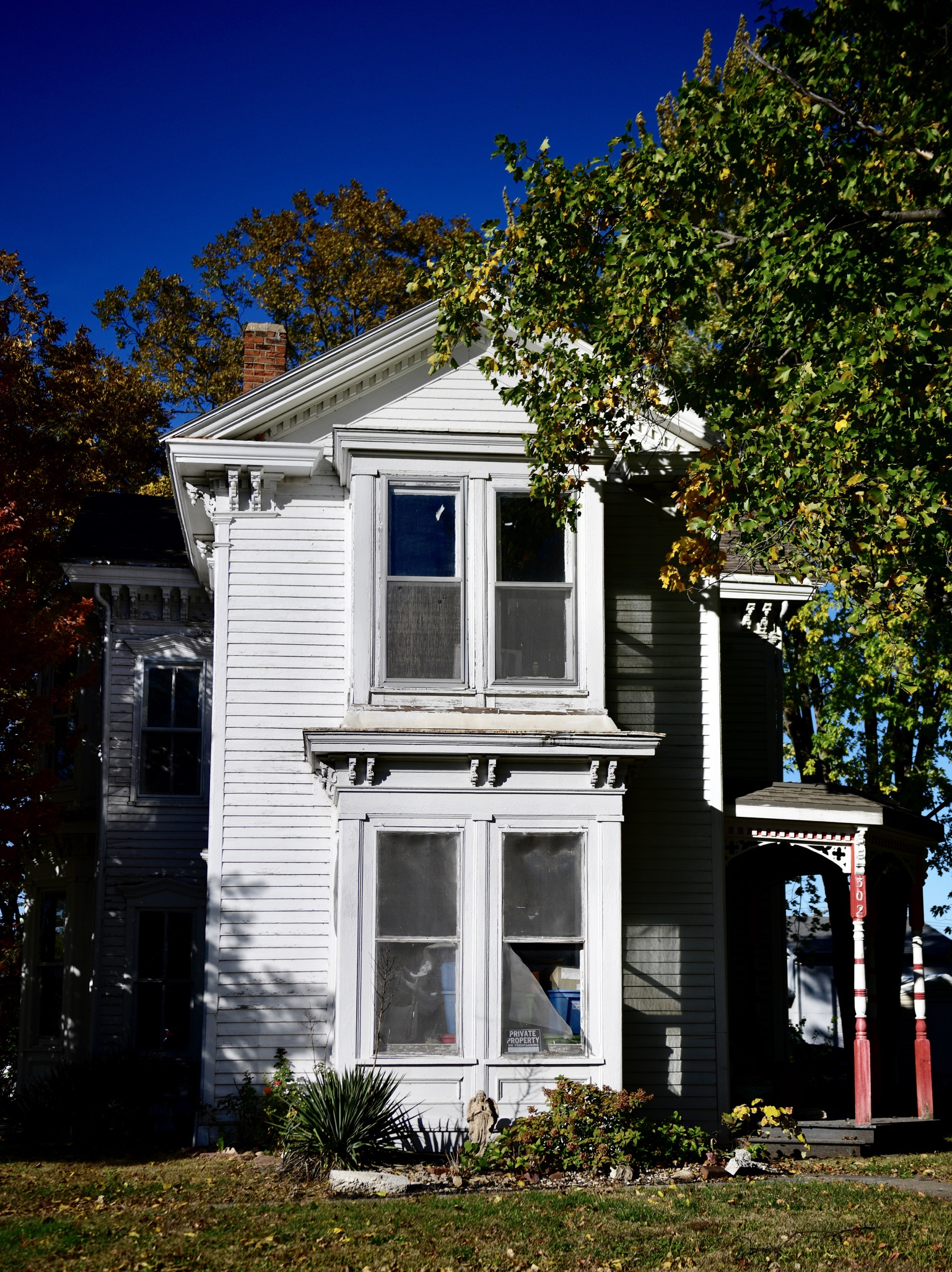

- Location within Missouri Location within the United States
- Location: 302 E. Second St. Salisbury, Missouri
- Coordinates: 39°25′22″N 92°47′53″W
- Area: less than one acre
- Built: 1873
- Architectural style: Italianate
- NRHP reference No.: 99000744
- Added to NRHP: June 25, 1999

Frabrishous and Sarah A. Thomas House is a historic home located at Salisbury, Chariton County, Missouri. It was built in 1873, and is a two-story, Italianate style frame dwelling. It sits on a brick and concrete block foundation. It has a 1 1/2-story rear addition and two-story cross-gable wing.

It was listed on the National Register of Historic Places in 1999.
