= Chariton County Jail and Sheriff's Residence =

Historic building in Missouri, United States

- U.S. National Register of Historic Places
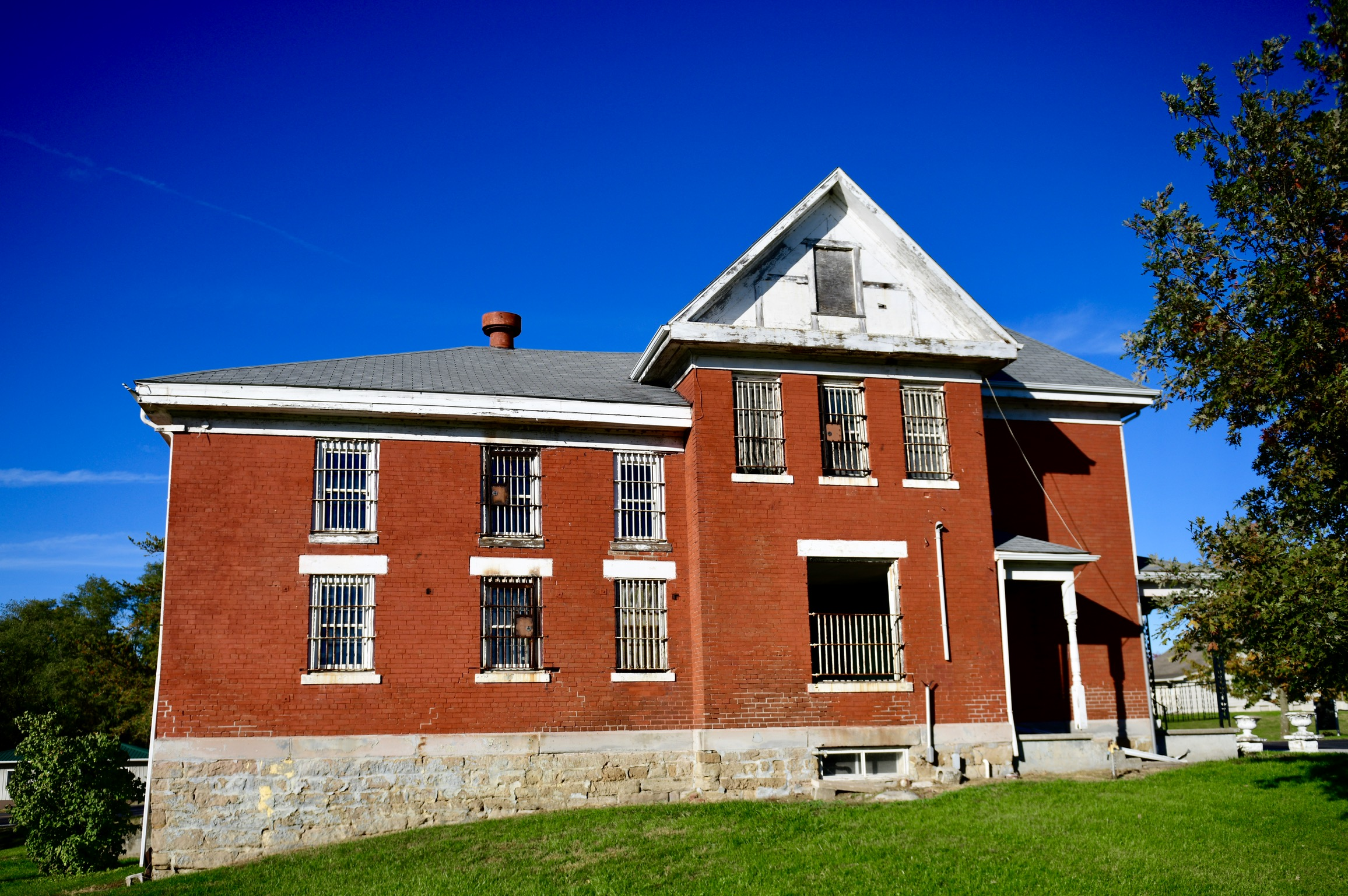

- Location within Missouri Location within the United States
- Location: 305 S. Cherry St. Keytesville, Missouri
- Coordinates: 39°25′58″N 92°56′30″W
- Area: less than one acre
- Built: 1906-1907
- Architect: multiple
- Architectural style: Queen Anne
- NRHP reference No.: 96001597
- Added to NRHP: January 16, 1997

Chariton County Jail and Sheriff's Residence is a historic combined sheriffs residence and jail in Keytesville, Missouri. It was built in 1906–1907, and is a 2 1/2-story, red brick building with Queen Anne-style detailing. It has a high hipped roof with lower cross gables. At the rear is the two story, rectangular cell block. A one-story block addition was built on the jail in 1970.

It was listed on the National Register of Historic Places in 1997.

The Chariton County Jail and Sheriff's Residence was demolished in 2019 due to structural instability.
