= Keytesville, Missouri =

- City
- Location of Keytesville, Missouri
- Coordinates: 39°25′53″N 92°56′13″W
- Country: United States
- State: Missouri
- County: Chariton
- Incorporated: 1868
- Named for: James Keyte

Area
  - Total: 0.78 sq mi (2.02 km^{2})
  - Land: 0.77 sq mi (1.99 km^{2})
  - Water: 0.012 sq mi (0.03 km^{2})
- Elevation: 702 ft (214 m)

Population (2020)
  - Total: 440
  - Density: 572.2/sq mi (220.93/km^{2})
- Time zone: UTC-6 (Central (CST))
  - Summer (DST): UTC-5 (CDT)
- ZIP code: 65261
- Area code: 660
- FIPS code: 29-38468
- GNIS feature ID: 2395525
- Website: www.keytesvillemo.com

Keytesville (/ˈkiːtsvɪl/ KEETS-vil) is a city in and the county seat of Chariton County, Missouri, United States. The population was 440 as of the 2020 census.

Keytesville is the hometown of U.S. Army General Maxwell D. Taylor, who commanded the "Screaming Eagles" 101st Airborne division during the Normandy invasion of World War II. Confederate General Sterling Price, who attacked Keytesville during an unsuccessful cavalry raid across his home state, had previously operated a hotel there.

== History ==
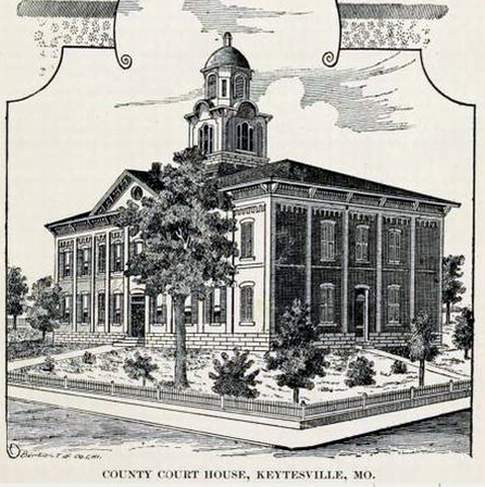
Chariton County's second courthouse. It replaced one destroyed by Confederate raiders during the Civil War.

The town is named for James Keyte, an Englishman and Methodist preacher who purchased a large parcel of land in 1830 and, two years later, donated fifty acres of it to Chariton County to establish a seat of county government. Until then, county business had been conducted from "Old Chariton," a village near the confluence of the Chariton and Missouri Rivers that was plagued by disease-spreading mosquitoes and subject to repeated flooding.

James Keyte constructed the first home in Keytesville, and the first business as well. Both were log structures, with the second doubling as a post office. Keyte also created the town's first industry when he constructed a mill near his home on Mussel Fork Creek.

The first courthouse was constructed in Keytesville between 1833 and 1834. As a two-story, four-room brick building, it survived until September 20, 1864, when it was burned down by Confederate raiders during the American Civil War.

Isaac Redding added Keytesville's first hotel in August 1842.

Keytesville was incorporated on February 3, 1868, by the state of Missouri, and incorporated as a Missouri 4th-class city in March 1883.

=== Confederate raid ===
On September 20, 1864, Confederate General Sterling Price arrived on the outskirts of Keytesville with a force of 250 men, among them George Todd and other members of Quantrill's Raiders under the command of Major John Thrailkill. This action was part of Price's 1864 campaign that extended across the state from eastern Missouri to the Kansas City area. When Thrailkill's force arrived, Keytesville was defended by a small Union detachment of 35 men from the Missouri militia, commanded by Lieutenant Anthony Pleyer. Many local residents were sympathetic to the Confederate cause. Early on the morning of September 20, under a flag of truce, Thrailkill demanded the surrender of the Union troops, promising fair treatment. Unable to persuade his men to fight, Pleyer surrendered. Price paroled the Union garrison, and six men promptly joined his force. Confederate forces then briefly occupied the town, commandeering supplies from various merchants, burning down the courthouse, and executing Chariton County sheriff Robert Carmon and William Young, a Union scout and alleged spy.

=== Late 19th century ===
In February 1866, a contract was awarded for construction of a replacement courthouse, a two-story brick building with cupola. Built at a cost of $40,000, it would serve the county until it was destroyed by fire on August 27, 1973. By the mid-1890s, Keytesville had an estimated population of about 1,100 citizens and two newspapers, the Chariton Courier and Keytesville Signal. Businesses included the Keytesville Roller Mill, a large water-powered grist mill on Mussel Fork Creek; two banks; a building and loan association; two hotels; a distillery; general mercantiles; and restaurants. Because of the town's location 1.5 mi (2.4 km) north of the Wabash Railroad line, Keytesville merchants encouraged the construction, in 1889, of a streetcar line. Hugo Bartz and J. J. Moore, secured land and financing for the project, which when completed consisted of two miles of track and a large barn for horses and rolling stock, constructed for a cost of $10,000. Two horse-drawn passenger coaches and a large flatcar for freight delivered new arrivals at the Wabash depot to the town.

=== Keytesville today ===
The town has a business district, a public library, and chamber of commerce, swimming pool, insurance sales, bank, convenience store, law offices, chiropractor, restaurant, auto repair, agricultural services and medical clinic. The town has various service clubs and organizations, including the Lions Club. There are three sites in Keytesville listed on the National Register of Historic Places: the First Presbyterian Church, the Chariton County Jail and Sheriff's Residence, and the Redding-Hill House. Price Park has a statue of Sterling Price sculpted by Allen George Newman. A new Chariton County Courthouse was constructed in Keytesville in the summer of 1974 and occupied the following July.

== Government ==
Keytesville, a Missouri 4th-class city, governs by a mayor-council system. Voters elect two aldermen from two wards, each serving a two-year term, and a mayor at-large, also for a two-year term. The Keytesville Fire District, a volunteer force, provides fire protection for the town and surrounding rural area. law enforcement duties are handled by the Chariton County Sheriff's Department. The department headquarters and county jail are located in Keytesville. The city of Keytesville operates two parks. One of the parks provides camping with full hookup available.

== Education ==
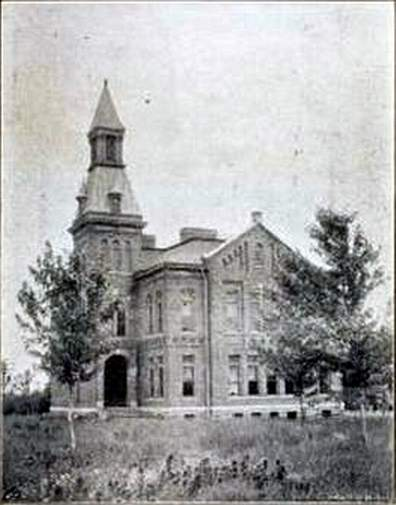
Keytesville school, built in 1889

Keytesville R-III School district serves the town of Keytesville and surrounding rural area. Education in the community dates to before the Civil War, but records indicating the exact date were lost in an 1861 fire at the county clerk's office. In 1889, what might be considered the first modern-style school, a large two-story building, was erected at a cost of $13,000. By 1909, Keytesville school was rated a first-class school by the state of Missouri. In 1949, a large number of the rural schools were combined with Keytesville to form the current district. The current high school was constructed in 1959, with the current elementary school added in 1967. In 2010, the district had a total of 153 students K-12, and a graduation rate of 90-percent.

The high school mascot is the Tiger and school colors are black and gold. Keytesville competes athletically in the Carroll-Livingston Activities Association. Its enrollment places the Tigers in Class 1 under Missouri State High School Activities Association guidelines.

== Geography ==
Keytesville is located at the intersection of U.S. Route 24 and Missouri Route 5. It is 10 mi (16 km) east of Brunswick and 30 mi (48 km) west of Moberly.

According to the United States Census Bureau, the city has a total area of 0.78 square miles (2.02 km^{2}), of which 0.77 square miles (1.99 km^{2}) is land and 0.01 square miles (0.03 km^{2}) is water.

== Demographics ==
Historical population
Census	Pop.	Note	%±
1870	529		—
1880	737		39.3%
1890	819		11.1%
1900	1,127		37.6%
1910	963		−14.6%
1920	872		−9.4%
1930	738		−15.4%
1940	854		15.7%
1950	733		−14.2%
1960	644		−12.1%
1970	730		13.4%
1980	689		−5.6%
1990	564		−18.1%
2000	533		−5.5%
2010	471		−11.6%
2020	440		−6.6%
U.S. Decennial Census

=== 2010 census ===
As of the census of 2010, there were 471 people, 225 households, and 124 families residing in the city. The population density was 611.7 inhabitants per square mile (236.2/km^{2}). There were 275 housing units at an average density of 357.1 per square mile (137.9/km^{2}). The racial makeup of the city was 98.5% White, 0.6% African American, 0.4% Native American, and 0.4% Asian.

There were 225 households, of which 20.0% had children under the age of 18 living with them, 42.2% were married couples living together, 7.6% had a female householder with no husband present, 5.3% had a male householder with no wife present, and 44.9% were non-families. 40.0% of all households were made up of individuals, and 16.4% had someone living alone who was 65 years of age or older. The average household size was 2.07 and the average family size was 2.71.

The median age in the city was 46.4 years. 17.8% of residents were under the age of 18; 8.6% were between the ages of 18 and 24; 21.2% were from 25 to 44; 31.5% were from 45 to 64; and 21% were 65 years of age or older. The gender makeup of the city was 49.7% male and 50.3% female.

=== 2000 census ===
As of the census of 2000, there were 533 people, 253 households, and 129 families residing in the city. The population density was 764.8 inhabitants per square mile (295.3/km^{2}). There were 295 housing units at an average density of 423.3 per square mile (163.4/km^{2}). The racial makeup of the city was 95.31% White, 3.94% African American, 0.19% from other races, and 0.56% from two or more races. Hispanic or Latino people of any race were 0.19% of the population.

There were 253 households, out of which 22.5% had children under the age of 18 living with them, 40.7% were married couples living together, 7.1% had a female householder with no husband present, and 49.0% were non-families. 45.5% of all households were made up of individuals, and 27.7% had someone living alone who was 65 years of age or older. The average household size was 2.07 and the average family size was 2.96.

In the city, the population was spread out, with 21.8% under the age of 18, 7.3% from 18 to 24, 23.3% from 25 to 44, 21.4% from 45 to 64, and 26.3% who were 65 years of age or older. The median age was 44 years. For every 100 females, there were 88.3 males. For every 100 females age 18 and over, there were 80.5 males.

The median income for a household in the city was $25,000, and the median income for a family was $35,568. Males had a median income of $25,156 versus $16,071 for females. The per capita income for the city was $14,699. About 10.9% of families and 16.4% of the population were below the poverty line, including 12.4% of those under age 18 and 17.0% of those age 65 or over.

== Notable people ==
- Jane Hadley Barkley, wife of U.S. Vice President Alben Barkley
- Cal Hubbard, member of both the Pro Football Hall of Fame, NFL Top 100, and National Baseball Hall of Fame and Museum
- Sterling Price, Missouri governor and Confederate general
- William W. Rucker, U.S. congressman
- Lyda Southard, serial killer
- Maxwell D. Taylor, U.S. Army general and diplomat

== 19th-century Keytesville ==
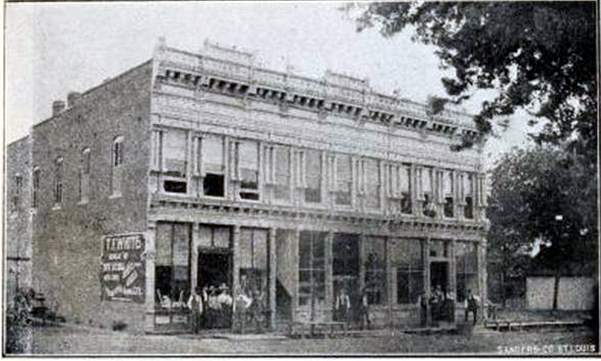
A portion of the Keytesville business district in 1896

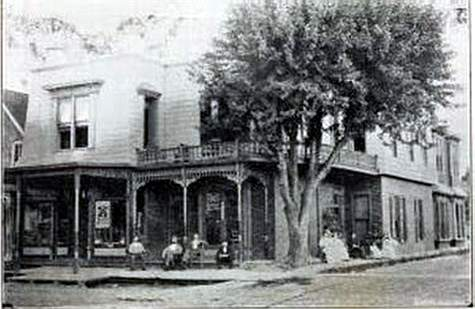
Sneed's Hotel, Keytesville, 1896

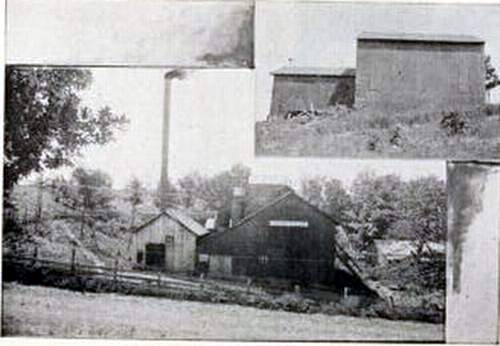
Big Spring Distillery, Keytesville, Missouri. Makers of "Old Chariton Rye" and "Ole Kentuck" whiskey, 1896

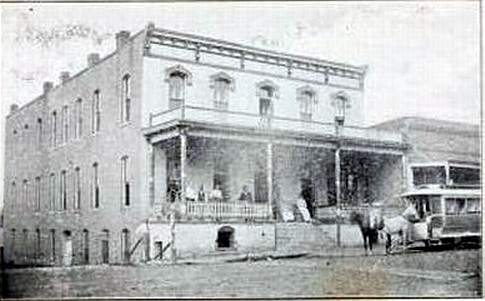
Hotel Snyder, Keytesville. Note the horse-drawn streetcar in the right corner, part of Keytesville's streetcar rail system.
