= Confederate monuments and memorials =

Confederate monuments and memorials in the United States include public displays and symbols of the Confederate States of America (CSA), Confederate leaders, or Confederate soldiers of the American Civil War. Many monuments and memorials have been or will be removed under great controversy. Part of the commemoration of the American Civil War, these symbols include monuments and statues, flags, holidays and other observances, and the names of schools, roads, parks, bridges, buildings, counties, cities, lakes, dams, military bases, and other public structures. In a December 2018 special report, Smithsonian Magazine stated, "over the past ten years, taxpayers have directed at least $40 million to Confederate monuments—statues, homes, parks, museums, libraries, and cemeteries—and to Confederate heritage organizations."

This entry does not include commemorations of pre-Civil War figures connected with the origins of the Civil War but not directly tied to the Confederacy, such as Supreme Court Justice Roger B. Taney, congressman Preston Brooks, North Carolina Chief Justice Thomas Ruffin, or Vice President John C. Calhoun, although monuments to Calhoun "have been the most consistent targets" of vandals.

Monuments and memorials are listed alphabetically by state, and by city within each state. States not listed have no known qualifying items for the list.

== History ==
=== Monument building and dedications ===
Memorials have been erected on public spaces (including on courthouse grounds) either at public expense or funded by private organizations and donors. Numerous private memorials have also been erected.

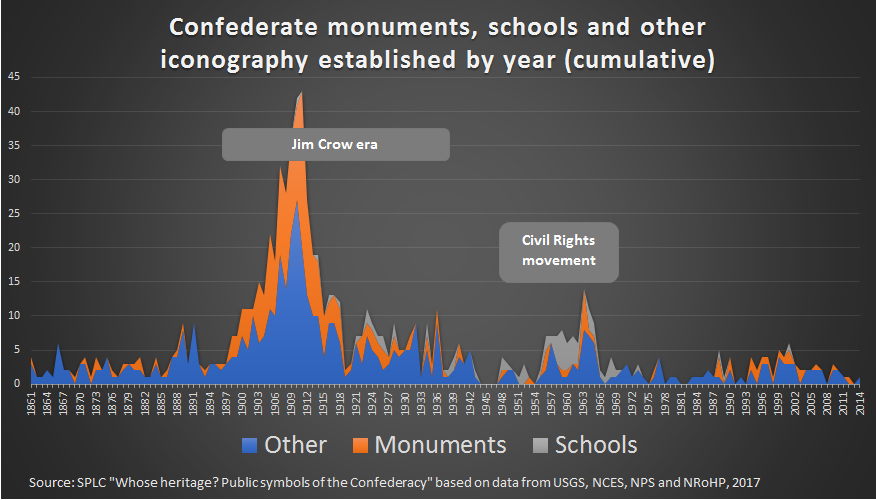
Chart of public symbols of the Confederacy and its leaders as surveyed by the Southern Poverty Law Center (SPLC), by year of establishment. Most of these were put up either during the Jim Crow era or during the Civil Rights Movement. (Note: This chart is based on data from an SPLC survey which identified "1,503 publicly sponsored symbols honoring Confederate leaders, soldiers or the Confederate States of America in general." The survey excluded "nearly 2,600 markers, battlefields, museums, cemeteries and other places or symbols that are largely historical in nature.") These two periods also coincided with the 50th and 100th anniversaries of the Civil War. (Note: "The second spike began in the early 1950s and lasted through the 1960s, as the civil rights movement led to a backlash among segregationists.")

According to Smithsonian Magazine, "Confederate monuments aren't just heirlooms, the artifacts of a bygone era. Instead, American taxpayers are still heavily investing in these tributes today." The report also concluded that the monuments were constructed and are regularly maintained in promotion of the Lost Cause, white supremacist mythology, and over the many decades of their establishment, African American leaders regularly protested these memorials and what they represented.

A small number of memorializations were made during the war, mainly as ship and place names. After the war, Robert E. Lee said on several occasions that he was opposed to any monuments, as they would, in his opinion, "keep open the sores of war". Nevertheless, monuments and memorials continued to be dedicated shortly after the American Civil War. Before 1890, most were erected in cemeteries as memorials to soldiers who died in the war. Many more monuments were dedicated in the years after 1890, when Congress established the first National Military Park at Chickamauga and Chattanooga, and by the turn of the 20th century, five battlefields from the Civil War had been preserved: Chickamauga-Chattanooga, Antietam, Gettysburg, Shiloh, and Vicksburg. At Vicksburg National Military Park, more than 95% of the park's monuments were erected in the first eighteen years after the park was established in 1899. But monuments began appearing in public places with the emergence of the Jim Crow South, coinciding with the nadir of American race relations.

=== Jim Crow ===
Confederate monument-building has often been part of widespread campaigns to promote and justify Jim Crow laws in the South. According to the American Historical Association (AHA), the erection of Confederate monuments during the early 20th century was "part and parcel of the initiation of legally mandated segregation and widespread disenfranchisement across the South." According to the AHA, memorials to the Confederacy erected during this period "were intended, in part, to obscure the terrorism required to overthrow Reconstruction, and to intimidate African Americans politically and isolate them from the mainstream of public life." A later wave of monument building coincided with the civil rights movement, and according to the AHA "these symbols of white supremacy are still being invoked for similar purposes." According to Smithsonian Magazine, "far from simply being markers of historic events and people, as proponents argue, these memorials were created and funded by Jim Crow governments to pay homage to a slave-owning society and to serve as blunt assertions of dominance over African-Americans."

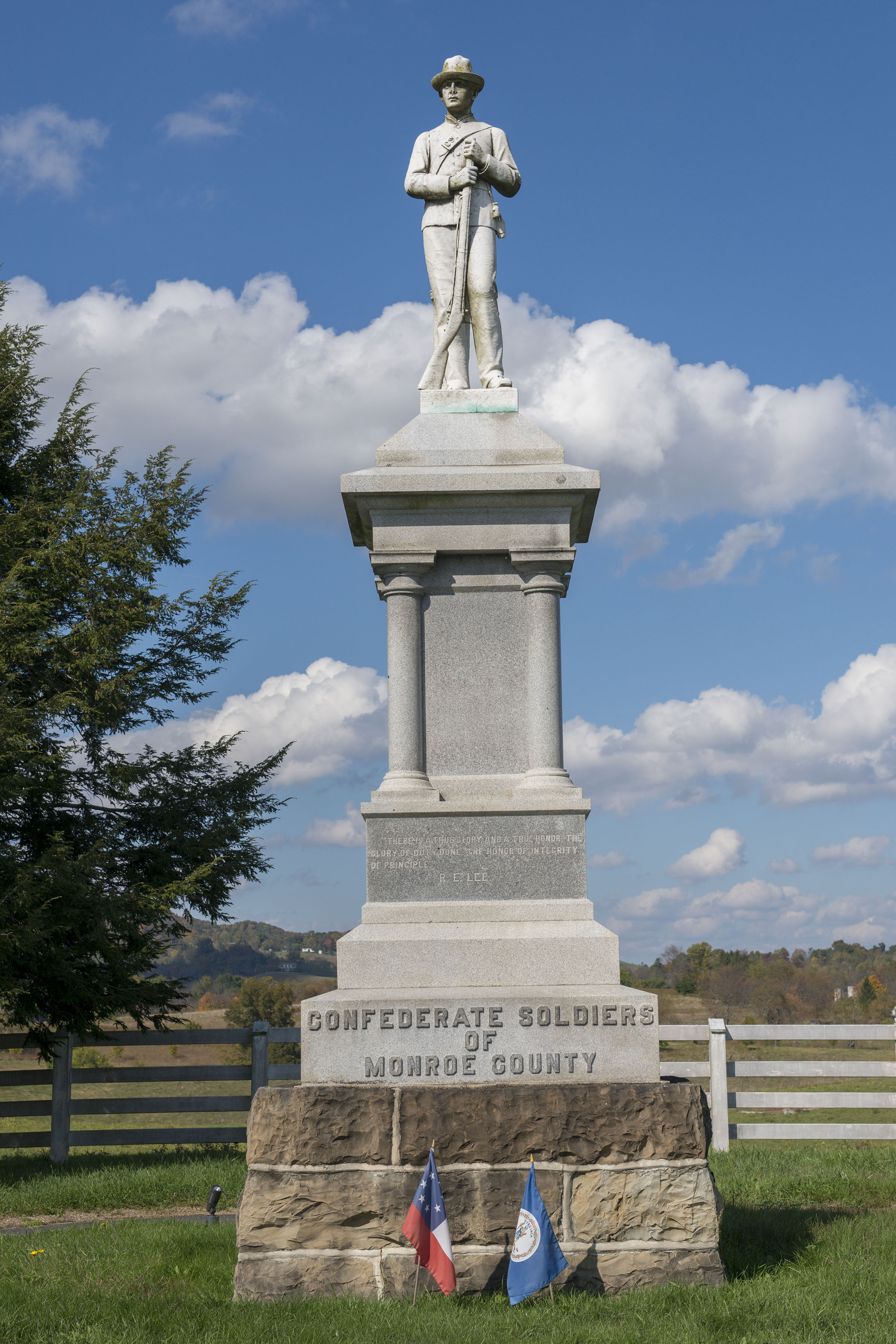
Confederate Soldier Statue, in Monroe County, West Virginia, 2016

According to historian Jane Dailey from the University of Chicago, in many cases, the purpose of the monuments was not to celebrate the past but rather to promote a "white supremacist future". Another historian, Karen L. Cox, from the University of North Carolina at Charlotte, has written that the monuments are "a legacy of the brutally racist Jim Crow era", and that "the whole point of Confederate monuments is to celebrate white supremacy". Another historian from UNC, James Leloudis, stated that "The funders and backers of these monuments are very explicit that they are requiring a political education and a legitimacy for the Jim Crow era and the right of white men to rule." They were erected without the consent or even input of Southern African Americans, who remembered the Civil War far differently, and who had no interest in honoring those who fought to keep them enslaved. According to Civil War historian Judith Giesberg, professor of history at Villanova University, "White supremacy is really what these statues represent." Some monuments were also meant to beautify cities as part of the City Beautiful movement, although this was secondary.

In a June 2018 speech, Civil War historian James I. Robertson Jr. of Virginia Tech said the monuments were not a "Jim Crow signal of defiance" and referred to the current trend to dismantle or destroy them as an "age of idiocy" motivated by "elements hell-bent on tearing apart unity that generations of Americans have painfully constructed." Katrina Dunn Johnson, Curator of the South Carolina Confederate Relic Room and Military Museum, states that "thousands of families throughout the country were unable to reclaim their soldier's remains--many never learned their loved ones' exact fate on the battlefield or within the prison camps. The psychological impact of such a devastating loss cannot be underestimated when attempting to understand the primary motivations behind Southern memorialization."

Many Confederate monuments were dedicated in the former Confederate states and border states in the decades following the Civil War, in many instances by Ladies Memorial Associations, United Daughters of the Confederacy (UDC), United Confederate Veterans (UCV), Sons of Confederate Veterans (SCV), the Heritage Preservation Association, and other memorial organizations. Other Confederate monuments are located on Civil War battlefields. Many Confederate monuments are listed on the National Register of Historic Places, either separately or as contributing objects within listings of courthouses or historic districts. Art historians Cynthia Mills and Pamela Simpson argued, in Monuments to the Lost Cause, that the majority of Confederate monuments, of the type they define, were "commissioned by white women, in hope of preserving a positive vision of antebellum life."

In the late nineteenth century, technological innovations in the granite and bronze industries helped reduce costs and made monuments more affordable for small towns. Companies looking to capitalize on this opportunity often sold nearly identical copies of monuments to both the North and South.

Another wave of monument construction coincided with the Civil Rights Movement and the American Civil War Centennial. At least thirty-two Confederate monuments were dedicated between 2000 and 2017, including at least 7 re-dedications.

=== Scholarly study ===
Scholarly studies of the monuments began in the 1980s. In 1983 John J. Winberry published a study which was based on data from the work of R.W. Widener. He estimated that the main building period for monuments was from 1889 to 1929 and that of the monuments erected in courthouse squares over half were built between 1902 and 1912. He determined four main locations for monuments; battlefields, cemeteries, county courthouse grounds, and state capitol grounds. Over a third of the courthouse monuments were dedicated to the dead. The majority of the cemetery monuments in his study were built in the pre-1900 period, while most of the courthouse monuments were erected after 1900. Of the 666 monuments in his study 55% were of Confederate soldiers, while 28% were obelisks. Soldiers dominated courthouse grounds, while obelisks account for nearly half of cemetery monuments. The idea that the soldier statues always faced north was found to be untrue and that the soldiers usually faced the same direction as the courthouse. He noted that the monuments were "remarkably diverse" with "only a few instances of repetition of inscriptions".

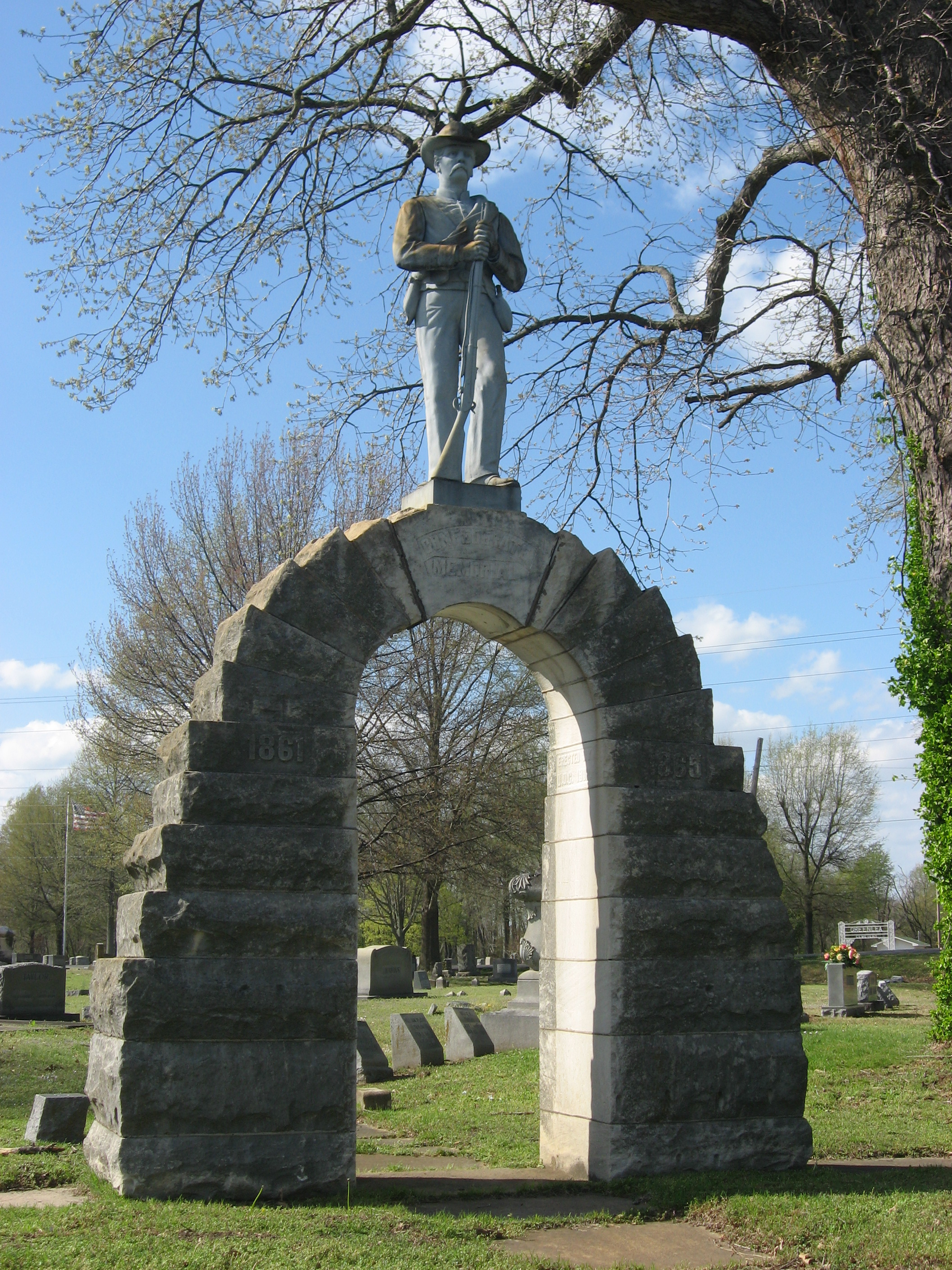
The Confederate Memorial in Fulton, Kentucky is listed on the National Register of Historic Places

He categorized the monuments into four types. Type 1 was a Confederate soldier on a column with his weapon at parade rest, or weaponless and gazing into the distance. These accounted for approximately half the monuments studied. They are, however, the most popular among the courthouse monuments. Type 2 was a Confederate soldier on a column with rifle ready, or carrying a flag or bugle. Type 3 was an obelisk, often covered with drapery and bearing cannonballs or an urn. This type was 28% of the monuments studied, but 48% of the monuments in cemeteries and 18% of courthouse monuments. Type 4 was a miscellaneous group, including arches, standing stones, plaques, fountains, etc. These account for 17% of the monuments studied.

Over a third of the courthouse monuments were specifically dedicated to the Confederate dead. The first courthouse monument was erected in Bolivar, Tennessee, in 1867. By 1880 nine courthouse monuments had been erected. Winberry noted two centers of courthouse monuments: the Potomac counties of Virginia, from which the tradition spread to North Carolina, and a larger area covering Georgia, South Carolina and northern Florida. The diffusion of courthouse monuments was aided by organizations such as the United Confederate Veterans and their publications, though other factors may also have been effective.

Winberry listed four reasons for the shift from cemeteries to courthouses. First was the need to preserve the memory of the Confederate dead and also recognize the veterans who returned. Second was to celebrate the rebuilding of the South after the war. Third was the romanticizing of the Lost Cause, and the fourth was to unify the white population in a common heritage against the interests of African-American Southerners. He concluded: "No one of these four possible explanations for the Confederate monument is adequate or complete in itself. The monument is a symbol, but whether it was a memory of the past, a celebration of the present, or a portent of the future remains a difficult question to answer; monuments and symbols can be complicated and sometimes indecipherable."

== The Monument Movement ==
The Monument Movement was a national movement of the late 19th and early 20th century. The Union and Confederate monuments were erected as community memorials. In the North and South communities came together in the time of war, contributing their men and boys (and a few documented women), then they came together again to memorialize these soldiers and their contributions to the cause as they saw it. Citizens paid subscriptions to memorials, for monument associations, taxes were issued, the GAR, Allied Orders, the United Daughters of the Confederacy, and the United Confederate Veterans all lead fundraisers.

The monument to Confederate Colonel Francis S. Bartow was erected after First Manassas but was destroyed before or during Second Manassas. The other early monuments were Union monuments at Battle of Rowlett's Station in Munfordville, Kentucky in January 1862 for the men of the 32nd Indiana killed. It was removed for its own protection from the elements in 2008. Other early Union monuments before the war ended were the Hazen Brigade Monument in Murfreesboro and the 1865 Ladd and Whitney Monument in Lowell, Massachusetts.

The Northern memorials recorded in the survey work to date lists 11 monuments erected before 1866 including the previously mentioned monuments. Another ten monuments were documented in 1866, and 11 more in 1867 by the time the first post-war Confederate monuments were erected in Romney, Hampshire County, West Virginia and Chester, Chester County, South Carolina in 1867.

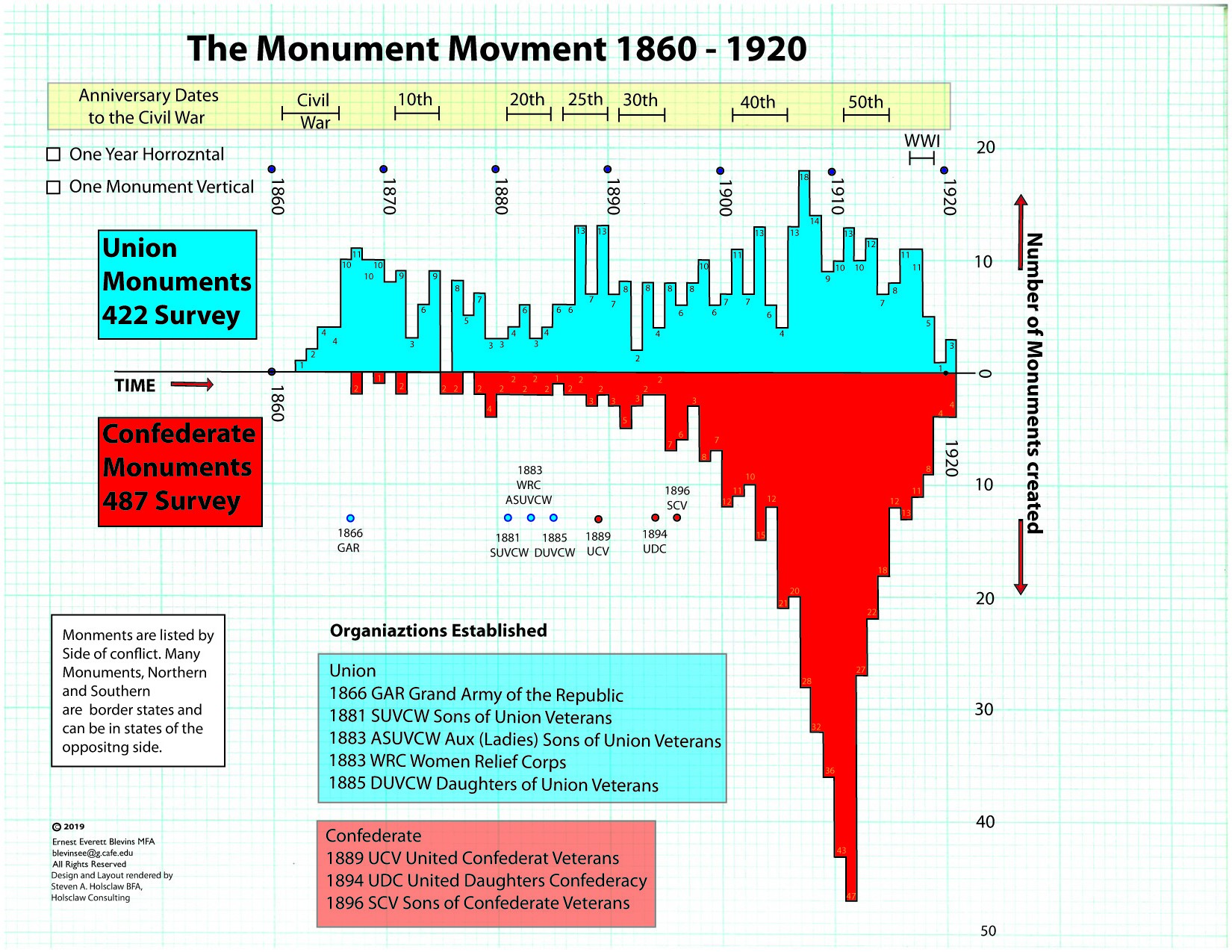
Blevins' "Forever in Mourning" Chart of Union and Confederate Monuments, 1860–1920

In addition to monuments to the Union and Confederate honorees, the Monument Movement saw the placement of Revolutionary War Monuments for the 100th of the American Revolution from 1876 to 1883. In the W.H. Mullins Company catalog, The Blue and the Gray, it notes with Union and Confederate Monuments the company's recent installments of monuments for the Revolutionary War at Guilford Courthouse, North Carolina.

=== Vandalism ===
As of June 19, 2019, over 12 Confederate monuments had been vandalized in 2019, usually with paint.

=== Removal ===
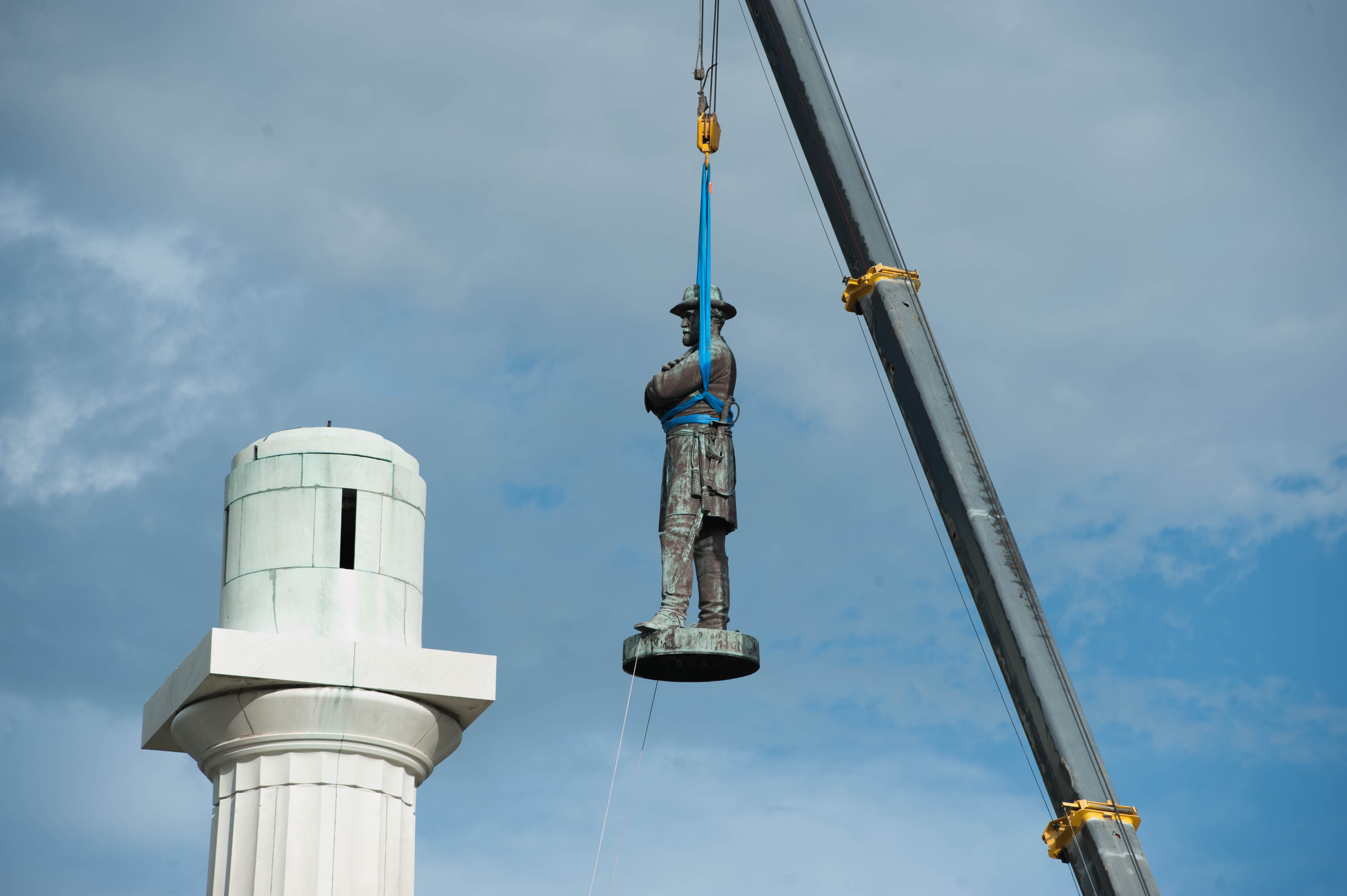
The Confederate Monument to Robert E. Lee was removed from its pedestal in Lee Circle in New Orleans on May 17, 2017

As of April 2017, at least 60 symbols of the Confederacy had been removed or renamed since 2015, according to the Southern Poverty Law Center (SPLC). At the same time, laws in various Southern states place restrictions on, or prohibit altogether, the removal of statues and memorials and the renaming of parks, roads, and schools.

A 2017 Reuters poll found that 54% of adults stated that the monuments should remain in all public spaces, and 27% said they should be removed, while 19% said they were unsure. The results were split along racial and political lines, with whites and Republicans preferring to keep the monuments in place, while Black Americans and Democrats were more likely to support their removal. A similar 2017 poll by HuffPost/YouGov found that one-third of respondents favored removal, while 49% were opposed.

Support for removal increased during the George Floyd protests, with 52% in favor of removal, and 44% opposed.

Time period	Number of removals
1865–2009	2
2009–2014	3
2015 (after Charleston church shooting)	4
2016	4
2017 (year of the Charlottesville car attack)	36
2018	8
2019	4
2020 (after murder of George Floyd)	94
2021	16

== Geographic distribution ==
Confederate monuments are widely distributed across the southern United States with a few dozen scattered throughout the border states and several hundred at Gettysburg, Pennsylvania. The distribution pattern follows the general political boundaries of the Confederacy. Of the more than 1503 public monuments and memorials to the Confederacy, more than 718 are monuments and statues. Nearly 300 monuments and statues are in Georgia, Virginia, or North Carolina. The western states that were largely settled after the Civil War have few or no memorials to the Confederacy.

== National ==
=== United States Capitol ===
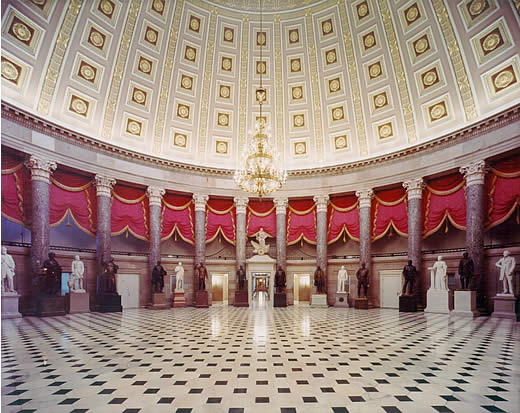
There are six Confederate figures in the National Statuary Hall Collection, in the United States Capitol.

In the National Statuary Hall Collection, housed inside the United States Capitol, each state has provided statues of two citizens that the state wants to honor. Six Confederate figures are among them. The dates listed below reflect when each statue was given to the collection:

- Zebulon Baird Vance (North Carolina, 1916)
- Joseph Wheeler (Alabama, 1925)
- Alexander Hamilton Stephens (Georgia, 1927)
- Wade Hampton III (South Carolina, 1929)
- Jefferson Davis (Mississippi, 1931)
- James Zachariah George (Mississippi, 1931)

In addition to these pieces, four additional sculptures of Confederate figures have been removed since the turn of the 21st century.

- Jabez Lamar Monroe Curry (Alabama, 1908) was removed and replaced by a statue of Helen Keller in 2009.
- Robert E. Lee (Virginia, 1909) was removed in 2020. In January 2023, the design of a replacement statue of Barbara Rose Johns was revealed. At the time, sculptor Steven Weitzman stated that the statue would be ready for installation sometime in 2024.
- Edmund Kirby Smith (Florida, 1922) was removed in 2021 and replaced by a statue of Mary McLeod Bethune in 2022.
- Uriah M. Rose (Arkansas, 1917) In 2019, the Arkansas legislature voted to replace both of its contributions to the collection, the statue of Rose and one of James Paul Clarke. In 2024, the statues were replaced by the statues of Johnny Cash and Daisy Bates. Rose's statue was moved to his former law firm in Little Rock, Arkansas in 2025.

=== Arlington National Cemetery ===
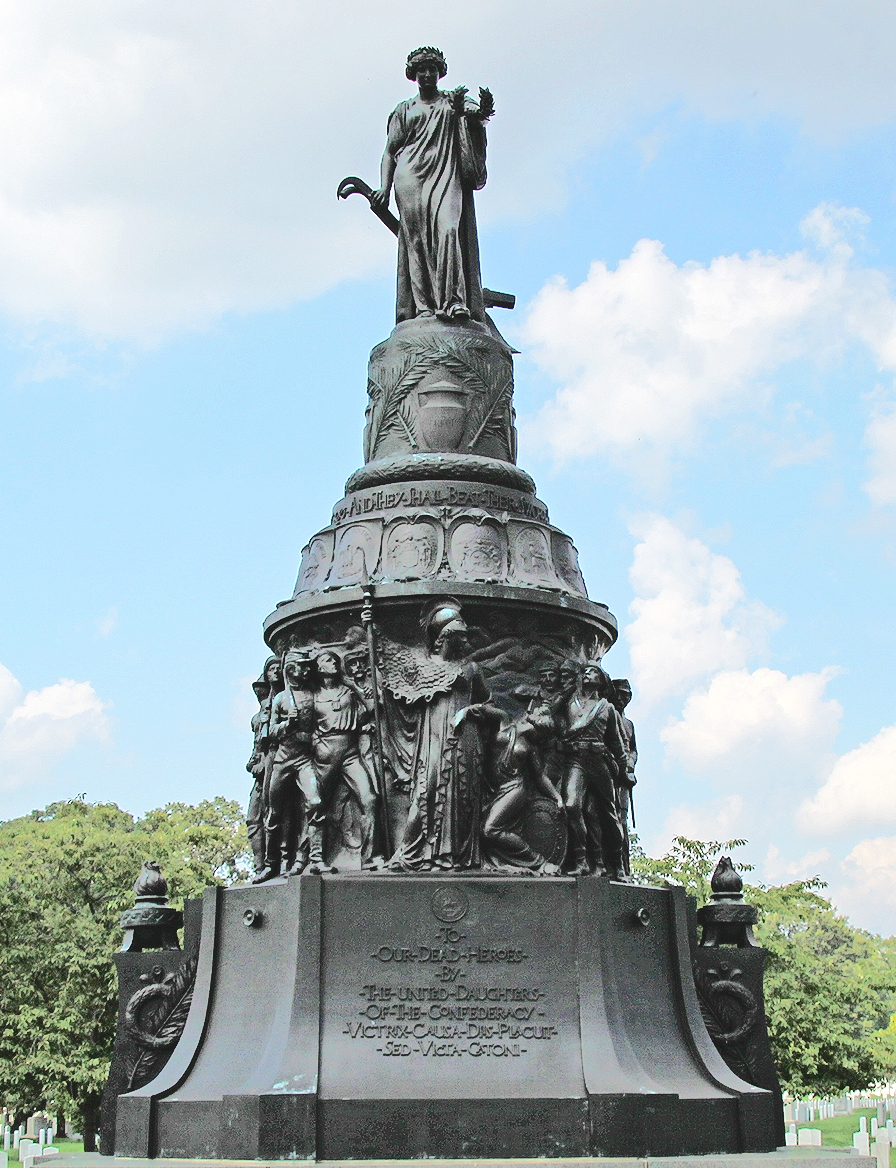
Confederate Memorial, Arlington National Cemetery

- The antebellum home of Robert E. Lee during the Civil War, Arlington House, in Arlington County, Virginia, overlooks Arlington National Cemetery. A National Park Service (NPS) memorial, the estate became the site of Arlington National Cemetery in part to ensure that Lee could never live there.

The NPS describes the property as "the nation's memorial to Robert E. Lee. It honors him for specific reasons, including his role in promoting peace and reunion after the Civil War. In a larger sense it exists as a place of study and contemplation of the meaning of some of the most difficult aspects of American History: military service; sacrifice; citizenship; duty; loyalty; slavery and freedom."

- The Confederate Memorial at Arlington National Cemetery was a project of the United Daughters of the Confederacy authorized in 1906 by the United States Secretary of War William Howard Taft and unveiled by President Wilson in 1914. The memorial was removed in December 2023.

=== Coins and stamps ===
- Robert E. Lee and Stonewall Jackson were portrayed by the US Mint on the 1925 Commemorative silver US half dollar, along with the words "Stone Mountain". The coin was a fundraiser for the Stone Mountain monument, which honors the Confederate Generals. The authorized issue was 5 million coins, to be sold at $1 each, but that proved overly optimistic and only 1.3 million coins were released, many of which ended up in circulation after being spent for face value. The caption on the reverse reads "Memorial to the valor of the soldier of the South".
- Robert E. Lee has been commemorated on at least five US postage stamps. One 1936–37 stamp featured Generals Lee and Stonewall Jackson with Lee's home Stratford Hall.

=== US military ===
==== Bases ====
Prior to 2023, there were nine major U.S. military bases named in honor of Confederate military leaders, all in former Confederate states. Following nationwide protests over the murder of George Floyd by a police officer, the United States Congress in 2021 created The Naming Commission in order to rename military assets with names associated with the Confederacy. The United States Secretary of Defense was required to implement a plan developed by the commission and to "remove all names, symbols, displays, monuments, and paraphernalia that honor or commemorate the Confederate States of America or any person who served voluntarily with the Confederate States of America from all assets of the Department of Defense" within three years of the commission's creation.

By October 2023, all nine bases had officially been redesignated under new names proposed by the commission.

- Fort A.P. Hill (1941), near Bowling Green, Virginia, named for Confederate General A. P. Hill, was redesignated Fort Walker on 25 August 2023 in honor of Medal of Honor recipient and civilian army surgeon Dr. Mary Edwards Walker
- Fort Benning (1917), near Columbus, Georgia, named for Confederate General Henry L. Benning, was redesignated Fort Moore on 11 May 2023 in honor of General Hal Moore and his wife Julia Compton Moore However, it was redesignated as Fort Benning again in 2025.
- Fort Bragg (1918), in North Carolina, named for Confederate General Braxton Bragg, was redesignated Fort Liberty on 2 June 2023 in honor of Liberty. On 14 February 2025, it was again renamed to Fort Bragg, though this time under the namesake of U.S. Army paratrooper Roland L. Bragg from World War II, who holds no relation to Braxton Bragg.
- Fort Gordon (1917), near Augusta, Georgia, named for Confederate General John Brown Gordon, was redesignated as Fort Eisenhower on 27 October 2023 in honor of president Dwight D. Eisenhower
- Fort Hood (1942), in Killeen, Texas, formerly named after Confederate General John Bell Hood, was redesignated Fort Cavazos on 9 May 2023 in honor of General Richard Cavazos
- Fort Lee (1917), in Prince George County, Virginia, named after Confederate General Robert E. Lee, was redesignated Fort Gregg-Adams on 27 April 2023 in honor of Lieutenant General Arthur J. Gregg and Lieutenant Colonel Charity Adams
- Fort Pickett (1942), near Blackstone, Virginia, a Virginia National Guard installation named for Confederate General George Pickett, was redesignated Fort Barfoot on 24 March 2023 in honor of Medal of Honor recipient Colonel Van T. Barfoot
- Fort Polk (1941), near Leesville, Louisiana, named for Episcopal bishop and Confederate General Leonidas Polk, was redesignated Fort Johnson on 13 June 2023 in honor of Medal of Honor recipient Sergeant William Henry Johnson
- Fort Rucker (1942), in Dale County, Alabama, named for Confederate Colonel Edmund Rucker, was redesignated Fort Novosel on 10 April 2023 in honor of Medal of Honor recipient Chief Warrant Officer 4 Michael J. Novosel

==== Facilities ====
- Lee Barracks, named for CSA Gen. Robert E. Lee (1962), at U.S. Military Academy at West Point, New York.
- U.S. Naval Academy in Annapolis, Maryland:
  - Buchanan House, the Naval Academy superintendent's home, named for CSA naval officer Franklin Buchanan. A road near the house is also memorialized in Buchanan's name.
  - Maury Hall, home to the academy's division of Weapons and Systems Engineering, named for US naval officer in charge of the Depot of Charts and Instruments at Washington and later CSA naval officer Matthew Fontaine Maury.

==== Current ships ====
- USNS Maury (T-AGS-66) (2013), named for Matthew Fontaine Maury, was renamed USNS Marie Tharp for oceanographer Marie Tharp in 2023.

==== Former ships ====
and List of United States Navy ships commemorating the Confederate States of America

- USS Atchison County (LST-60), named for counties in Kansas and Missouri established in honor of Brigadier General David Rice Atchison
- USS Brooke (FFG-1) – frigate named after Confederate marine engineer John Mercer Brooke
- USS Buchanan: Three U.S. Navy destroyers have been named in honor of the highest ranked Confederate Admiral Franklin Buchanan
  - USS Buchanan (DD-131) 1919–1940 then transferred to UK Navy
  - USS Buchanan (DD-484) 1941–1949 then transferred to Turkey's Navy
  - USS Buchanan (DDG-14) 1960–1991 then sank as target in 2000
- USS Dixon (AS-37) – Submarine tender named after Confederate submarine commander George E. Dixon
- USS Hunley (AS-31) – Submarine tender named after Confederate marine engineer Horace Lawson Hunley
- USS Maury – 5 former ships have carried the Maury name dating from WWI and WWII.
- USS Robert E Lee (SSBN-601) (ballistic missile submarine) in honor of Gen. Robert E. Lee.
- USS Richard L. Page (FFG-5) – frigate named after Confederate General Richard Lucian Page
- USS Semmes – two destroyers have been named for Raphael Semmes.
  - USS Semmes (DD-189) 1920–1946
  - USS Semmes (DDG-18) 1962–1991
- USS Stonewall Jackson (SSBN-634) 1964–1995.
- USS Tattnall (DDG-19) – destroyer named after Confederate Commodore Josiah Tattnall III
- USS Tom Green County (LST-1159) 1953–1972 then transferred to Spain. The namesake Texas County was named for CSA Brig Gen Thomas Green
- USS Waddell (DDG-24) – destroyer named after Confederate Captain James Iredell Waddell
- SS Zebulon B. Vance, a World War II liberty ship, named for CSA Colonel and North Carolina Confederate governor Zebulon Baird Vance.
- Liberty Ship #113, named for Joseph E. Johnston by the US Navy.
- Liberty ship #5, named for Alexander H. Stephens
- Liberty ship #8, named for Jefferson Davis

Several ships named for Confederate leaders fell into Union hands during the Civil War. The Union Navy retained the names of these ships while turning their guns against the Confederacy:

- Beauregard a privateer with letters of marque issued by the Confederacy, named in honor of Gen. P. G. T. Beauregard. Captured as a prize and purchased on February 24, 1862, by the Union Navy which operated it as the USS Beauregard.
- USS General Price (1862) a Confederate ship sunk in battle, raised and used by the Union until sold in 1865.

== Multi-state highways ==
- Jefferson Davis Highway, Arlington, Virginia, to San Diego, California. The highway labeling (no road construction was involved) was a project of the United Daughters of the Confederacy. Never completed as originally planned, and its route is not completely clear. Markers that remain are listed under the states.

On October 16, 2018, the Board of Commissioners of Orange County, North Carolina (location of the University of North Carolina at Chapel Hill, see Silent Sam), voted unanimously to repeal the county's 1959 resolution naming for Davis the portion of U.S. 15 running through the county.

- Lee Highway, New York City to San Francisco. Markers that remain are listed under the states.
- Dixie Highway - a road from Canada to Miami
- Dixie Overland Highway - a road from California to Georgia

== Alabama ==
As of 24 June 2020, there are at least 122 public spaces with Confederate monuments in Alabama.

== Alaska ==
- Yukon–Koyukuk Census Area: "Confederate Gulch" and "Union Gulch" both drain the side of a mineralized mountain mass northeast of Wiseman. Gold was discovered in both gulches in the early 20th century, though only Union Gulch was mined.

== Arizona ==
As of 20 August 2020, only two Confederate related plaques on public property remain in Phoenix and Sierra Vista, Arizona.

Type of monument	Date	Location	Details	Image
Public	2010	Sierra Vista	Confederate Memorial, Historical Soldiers Memorial Cemetery area of the state-owned Southern Arizona Veterans' Memorial Cemetery. The monument was erected in to honor the 21 soldiers interred in that cemetery who served in the Confederate Army during the Civil War and later fought in Indian wars in Arizona as members of the U.S. Army.	
Private	1999	Phoenix	Arizona Confederate Veterans Monument, at Greenwood Memory Lawn Cemetery; erected by SCV.	
Public	1961–2020	Phoenix	Memorial to Arizona Confederate Troops, in Wesley Bolin Park, next to the Arizona State Capitol; UDC memorial.	
Road	1943–2020		Jefferson Davis Memorial Highway marker 50 mi (80 km) east of Phoenix; erected by UDC. Tarred and feathered in August 2017.	
Public	1984–2015	Picacho Peak State Park	A commemorative sign and a plaque commemorated the Battle of Picacho Pass, the westernmost Confederate engagement of the war. The sign is "dedicated to Capt. Sherod Hunter's 'Arizona Rangers, Arizona Volunteers' C.S.A.", while the plaque states three Union soldiers buried on battlefield and includes both US Union and CSA flags. The sign was removed in 2015 due to deterioration of the wood and the plaque was moved onto the Union stone monument.	

== Arkansas ==
As of 24 June 2020, there are at least 65 public spaces with Confederate monuments in Arkansas.

=== State capitol ===
- Confederate Soldiers Monument, also known as Defense of the Flag, Arkansas State Capitol grounds, (1905).
- Confederate War Prisoners Memorial, Arkansas State Capitol grounds.
- Monument to Confederate Women (or "Mother of the South"), Arkansas State Capitol grounds, Little Rock, Arkansas. Statue depicts a mother and daughter saying good-bye to their 16-year-old son and brother who is leaving to join his father in the fighting. (1913)
- Old State House, several on the grounds:
  - David O. Dodd Memorial (1923)
  - Defenders Memorial Plaque (1932)
  - Gen. Thomas J. Churchill Memorial (1928)
  - Gen. William Read Scurry Memorial (1928)
  - Old State House Confederate Memorial

=== Monuments ===
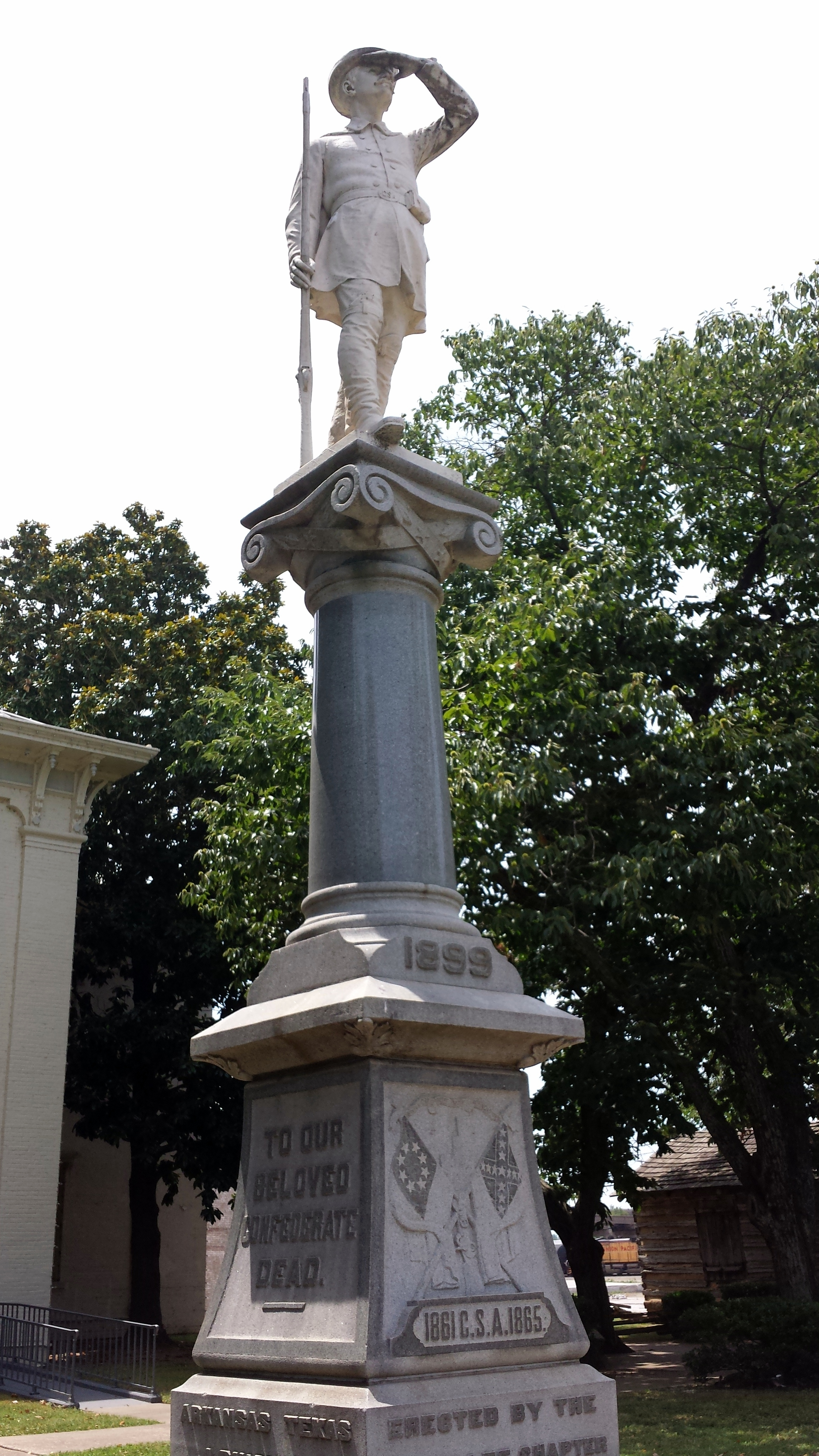
Van Buren Confederate Monument at Crawford County Courthouse in Van Buren, Arkansas

==== Courthouse monuments ====
- Arkadelphia: Arkadelphia Confederate Monument (1911)
- Blytheville: Confederate War Memorial (1934)
- Camden: Camden Confederate Monument (1915)
- Conway: Conway Confederate Monument (1925)
- El Dorado: El Dorado Confederate Monument (1909)
- Fort Smith: Ft. Smith Confederate Monument (1903)
- Lake Village: Lake Village Confederate Monument (1910)
- Lonoke: Lonoke Confederate Monument (1910)
- Marion, Crittenden County: Civil War Memorial (1936)
- Osceola: Searcy Confederate Monument (1917)
- Van Buren: Van Buren Confederate Monument (1899)

==== Other public monuments ====
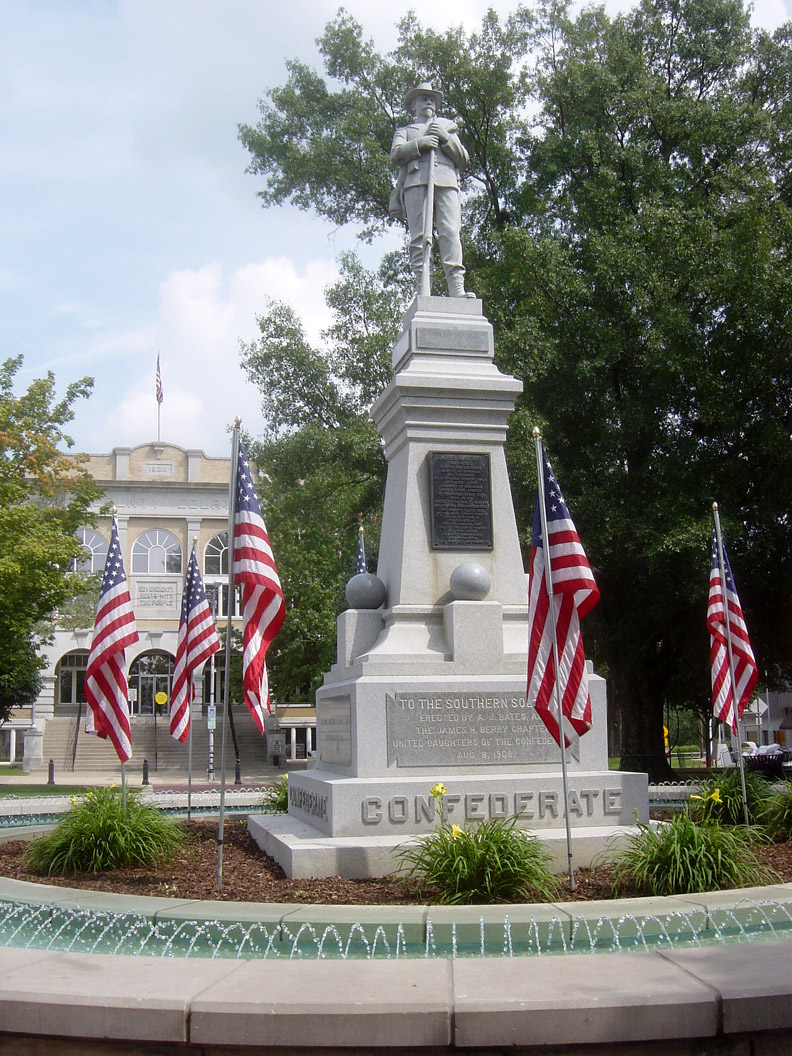
Bentonville Confederate Monument

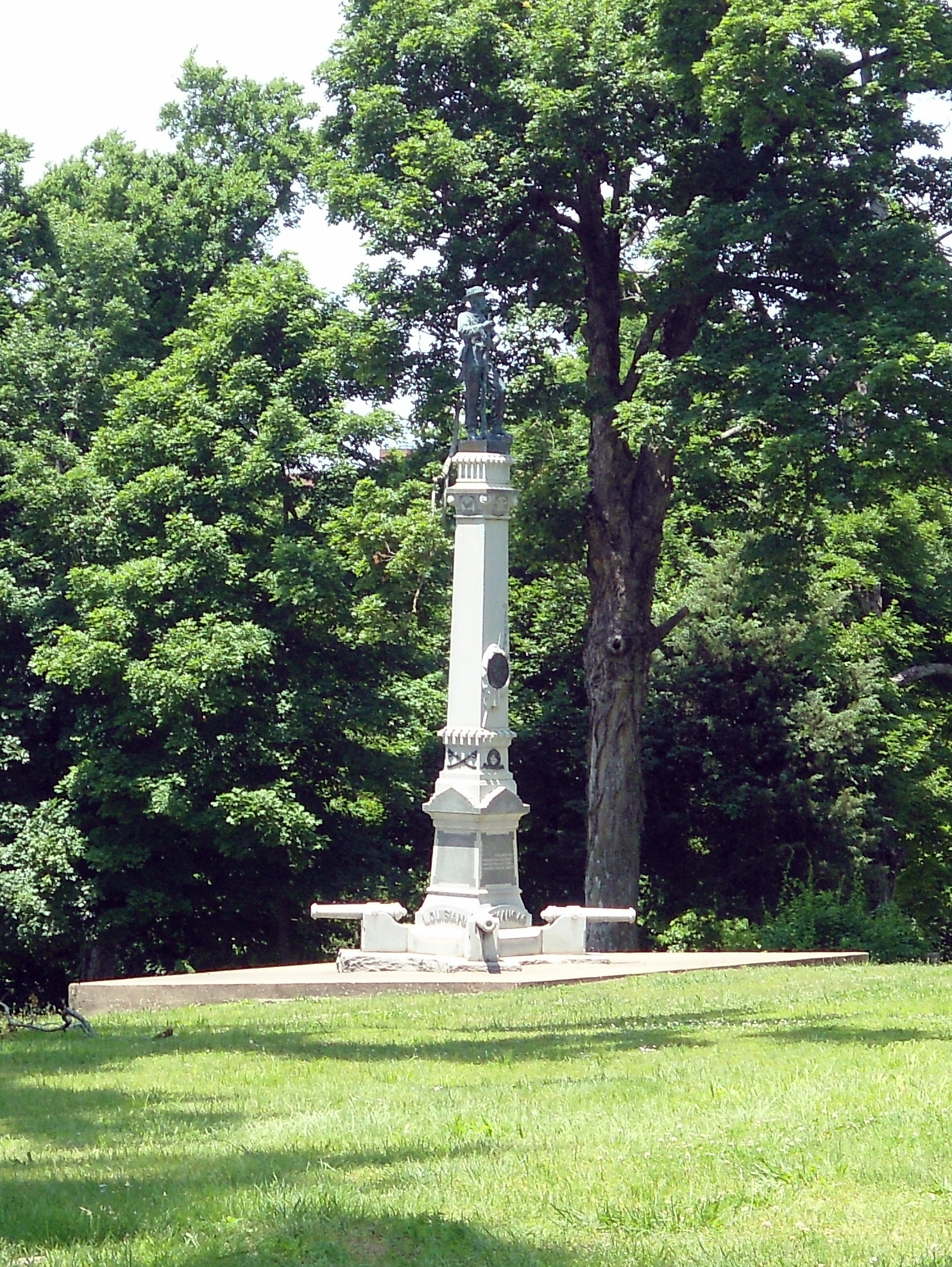
Confederate Statue, Fayetteville Confederate Cemetery

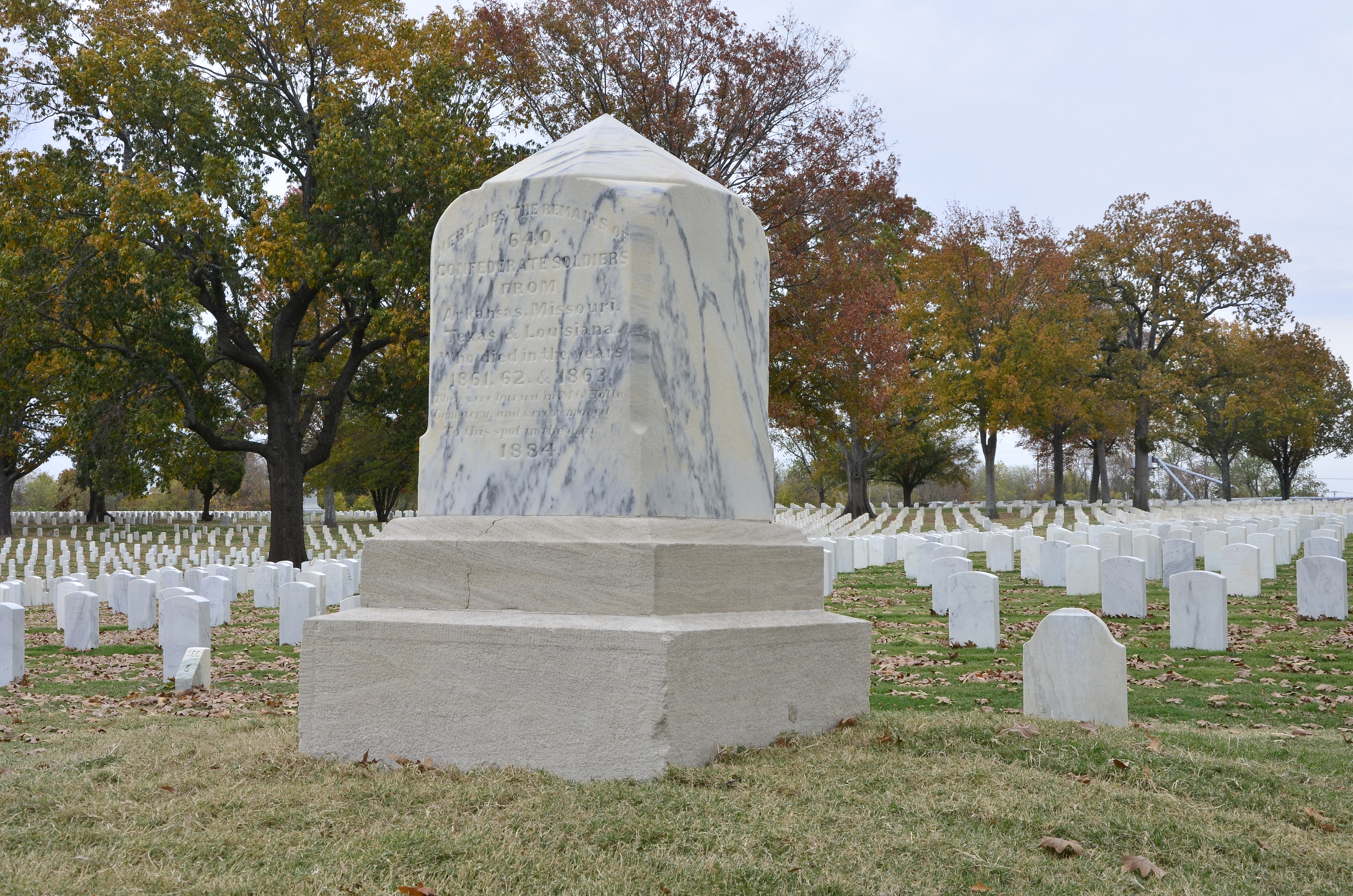
Confederate Soldiers Monument, Little Rock National Cemetery

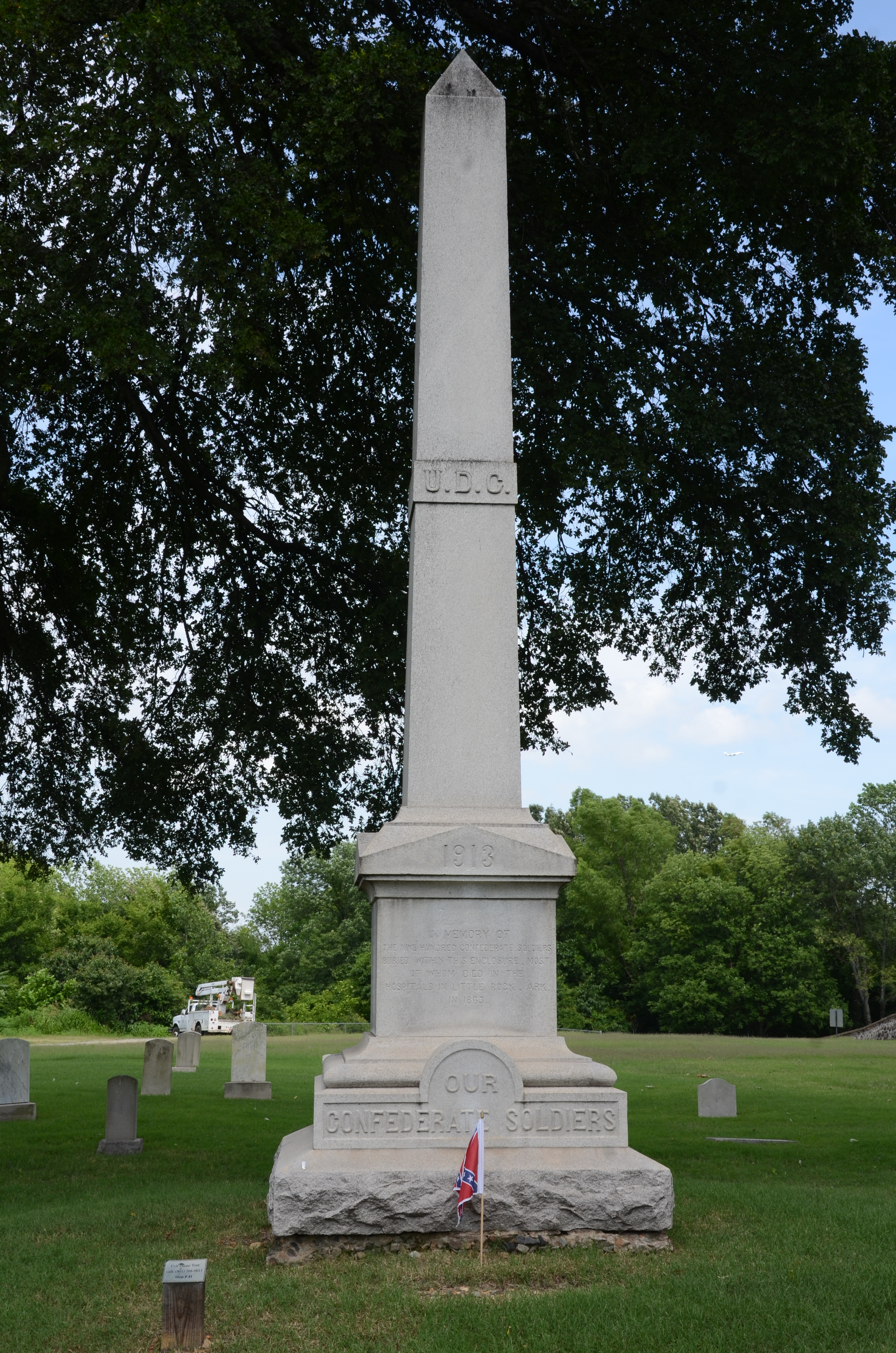
Little Rock Confederate Memorial, Little Rock National Cemetery

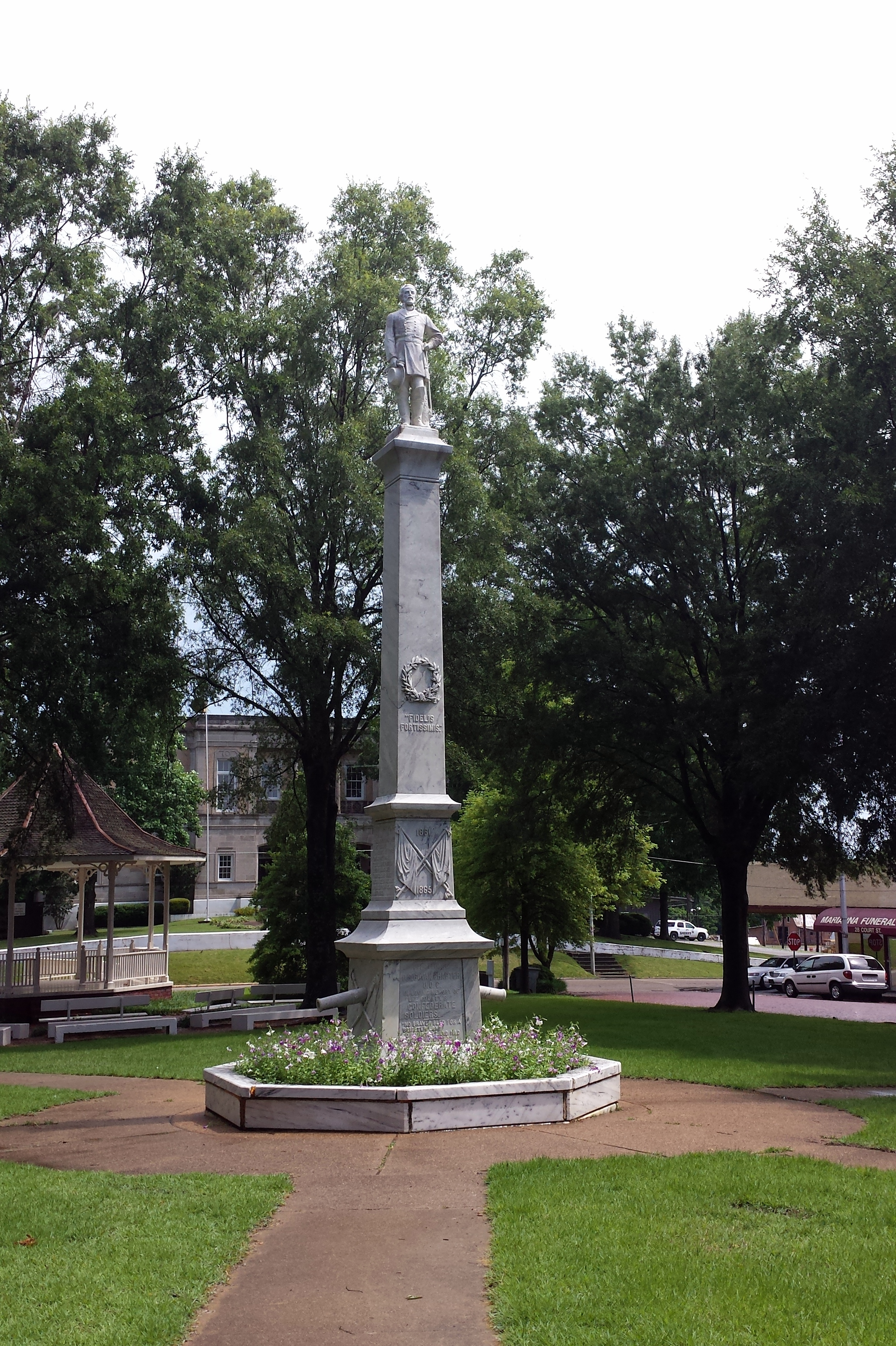
Robert E. Lee Monument in Marianna

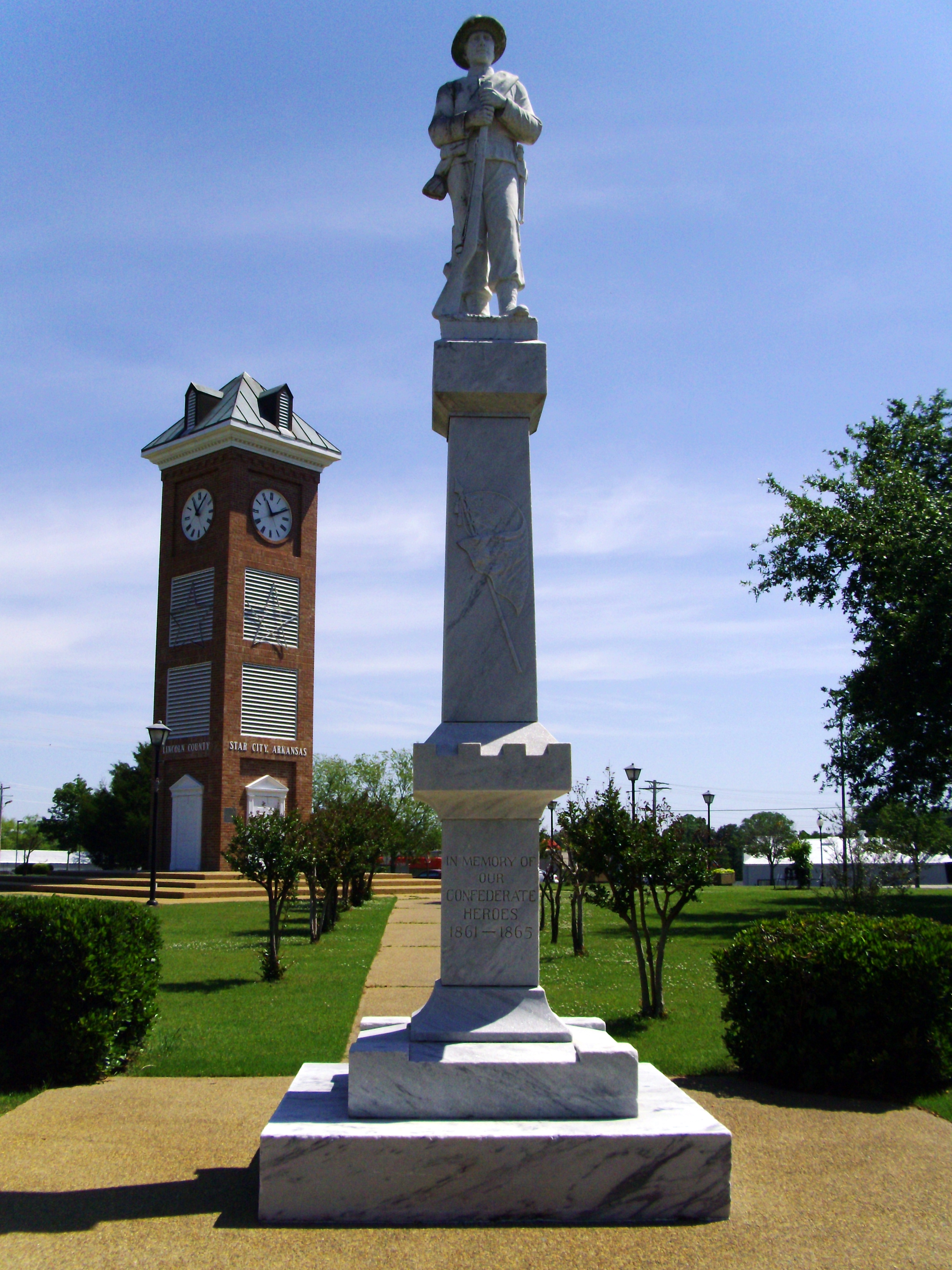
Star City Confederate Memorial

- Batesville: Batesville Confederate Monument (1907)
- Benton: Confederate Veterans' Memorial
- Bentonville: Bentonville Confederate Monument (1908); UDC monument
- Camden: Granite obelisk topped by a cannonball, in fenced-off Confederate section of Oakland Cemetery
- Clarendon: Confederate Memorial
- Clarksville: Clarksville Confederate Monument, (1902) The Oakland Cemetery obelisk inscribed, "Sacred to the memory of our Confederate dead," was added to the National Register of Historic Places in 1999.
- Dardanelle: Dardanelle Confederate Monument (1921)
- Fayetteville: Confederate statue (1897), Fayetteville Confederate Cemetery
- Fort Smith: Jefferson Davis Memorial (1937)
- Grant County: UDC monument (1928) at Jenkins' Ferry Battleground State Park to Confederate soldiers who died at the Battle of Jenkins' Ferry
- Harrison: Boone County Confederate Veterans Memorial, on the grounds of the Boone County Courthouse (1986)
- Hot Springs:
  - Confederate State Capital, Bathhouse Row
  - Hot Springs Confederate Monument (1934)
- Jacksonport: Jackson County Confederate Memorial (1914)
- Little Rock:
  - Children of the Confederacy
  - Confederate Bench (1936)
  - Confederate Last Stand Monument
  - CSS Pontchartrain
  - Little Rock National Cemetery:
    - Confederate Soldiers Monument (1884); marks the mass burial of 640 Confederate soldiers
    - Little Rock Confederate Memorial (1913)
  - Memorial to Company A Confederate Soldiers (1911)
  - Monument to Confederate Soldiers (1905)
  - Southern Soldiers Memorial
- Magnolia: Gen. John Porter McCown Monument
- Marianna: Gen. Robert E. Lee Monument, 1910.
- Marmaduke: John Sappington Marmaduke Memorial
- Monticello: Monticello Confederate Monument
- New Edinburg: Captain Richard Tunball Banks Monument, 1864.
- Newport: Jackson Guards Memorial, built in 1914. Monument consists of a statue of a single Confederate soldier and a roster of the men who served in the Jackson Guards and the slaves who supported them. The only Confederate monument in Arkansas built entirely with funds raised by private subscription, although it was built on a prominent piece of land donated by the city of Hot Springs.
- Pea Ridge:
  - Confederate Generals Memorial (1887)
  - Reunited Soldiery Monument (1889), one of the first to honor both Confederate and Union soldiers to be placed on a battlefield.
  - Texas Memorial, Pea Ridge City Park (1964).
- Pine Bluff:
  - David O. Dodd Memorial
  - Pine Bluff Confederate Monument (1910)
- Prescott: Confederate War Memorial (1964)
- Smithville: Confederate War Memorial (1996)
- Star City: Star City Confederate Memorial (1926) Erected on the courthouse grounds, moved in 1943 and moved again to its original position, now the town square, in the 1990s. Consists of a statue of a Confederate soldier.
- Van Buren:
  - Confederate Memorial (1906) Originally at Fairview Cemetery.
  - Fairview Cemetery Confederate Memorial; replacement when original was moved to downtown.
- Washington:
  - Confederate Masonic Memorial
  - Washington Confederate Monument (1888), Washington Presbyterian Cemetery. Listed on the National Register of Historic Places in 1996.

=== Inhabited places ===
- Cleburne County (1883), named for CSA Maj. Gen. Patrick Cleburne.
- Faulkner County (1873), named for CSA Capt. Sandford C. Faulkner.
- City of Forrest City (1870), named for CSA Gen. Nathan Bedford Forrest.
- Lee County (1873), named for CSA Gen. Robert E. Lee.

=== Parks ===
- Russellville: Confederate Mothers Memorial Park (1921). Land for the public park was donated by UDC and includes three stone monuments, each one placed by a different Confederate veterans or memorial organization, honoring the mothers of the Confederacy.

=== Roads ===
- El Dorado: Robert E. Lee Street
- Forrest City: Confederate Drive
- Heber Springs: Jefferson Davis Road
- Hughes: Jeff Davis Street
- Jacksonville: Jeff Davis Avenue
- Lake Village: Confederate Street
- Little Rock:
  - Beauregard Drive
  - Claiborne Drive
  - Longstreet Drive
  - Pickett Drive
- Malvern: Robert E. Lee Street
- Wilson: Jeb Stuart Drive

=== Schools ===
- Forrest City:
  - Forrest City High School (1914)
  - Forrest City Junior High School
- Little Rock: Robert E. Lee School
- Pine Bluff: Forrest Park Prep Preschool
- Springdale: Robert E. Lee Elementary School (1951)

=== State symbols ===
Flag of Arkansas since 1913

- Flag of Arkansas The blue star above "ARKANSAS" represents the Confederate States of America and is placed above the three other stars for the countries (Spain, France and the US) to which the State belonged before statehood. The diamond shape represents the nation's only diamond mine with a border of 25 stars, symbolizing the 25th U.S. state. The design of the border around the white diamond evokes the saltire found on the Confederate battle flag.

== California ==
As of 23 July 2020, there were at least four public spaces with Confederate monuments in California.

=== Inhabited places ===
- Confederate Corners, crossroads near Salinas, in Monterey County, fictionalized as Rebel Corners in John Steinbeck's novel The Wayward Bus. In 2018, name officially changed to Springtown, California, which it had been known by prior to becoming Confederate Corners.

=== Roads ===
- Los Angeles: Johnston Street in Lincoln Heights, named for CSA Gen. Albert Sidney Johnston.
- There are at least four remaining markers of the Jefferson Davis Highway in the state of California including the following:
  - Bakersfield in Pioneer Village (1942, rededicated 1968)
  - Hornbrook (1944)
  - Winterhaven at Fort Yuma

=== Schools ===
- Anaheim: Savanna High School (1961) mascot has always been Johnny Rebel and a fiberglass statue of a Confederate soldier stood in the courtyard from 1964 until 2009 when it was removed due to deterioration. The school colors are red and grey and the school fields the Savanna Mighty Marching Rebel Band and Color Guard.

=== Mountains and recreation ===
- Alabama Hills, named for CSS Alabama
- Jeff Davis Peak Elevation: 9065 ft / 2763 m 36.637°N 119.897°W in the Mokelumne Wilderness mapped by the USGS in 1889; "however, it may have long been used locally, as many of the inhabitants of nearby Summit City (now abandoned [in the late 1860s]) were Confederate sympathizers during the civil war. Jefferson Davis (1809–89) was president of the Confederacy, 1861–65."
- Pickett Peak: named for Confederate General George Pickett. Elevation: 9118 ft / 2779 m 38.756°N 119.903°W in National Forest, near the Mokelumne Wilderness
- Fortuna: Pickett Peak Campground operated by the National Forest Service
- The Robert E. Lee giant sequoia in Kings Canyon National Park run by the National Park Service.

=== Mine ===
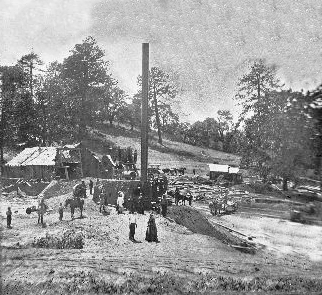
Stonewall Jackson Mine, San Diego County, circa 1872

- San Diego County: Stonewall Jackson Mine (1870–1893), the richest gold mine in southern California history

== Colorado ==
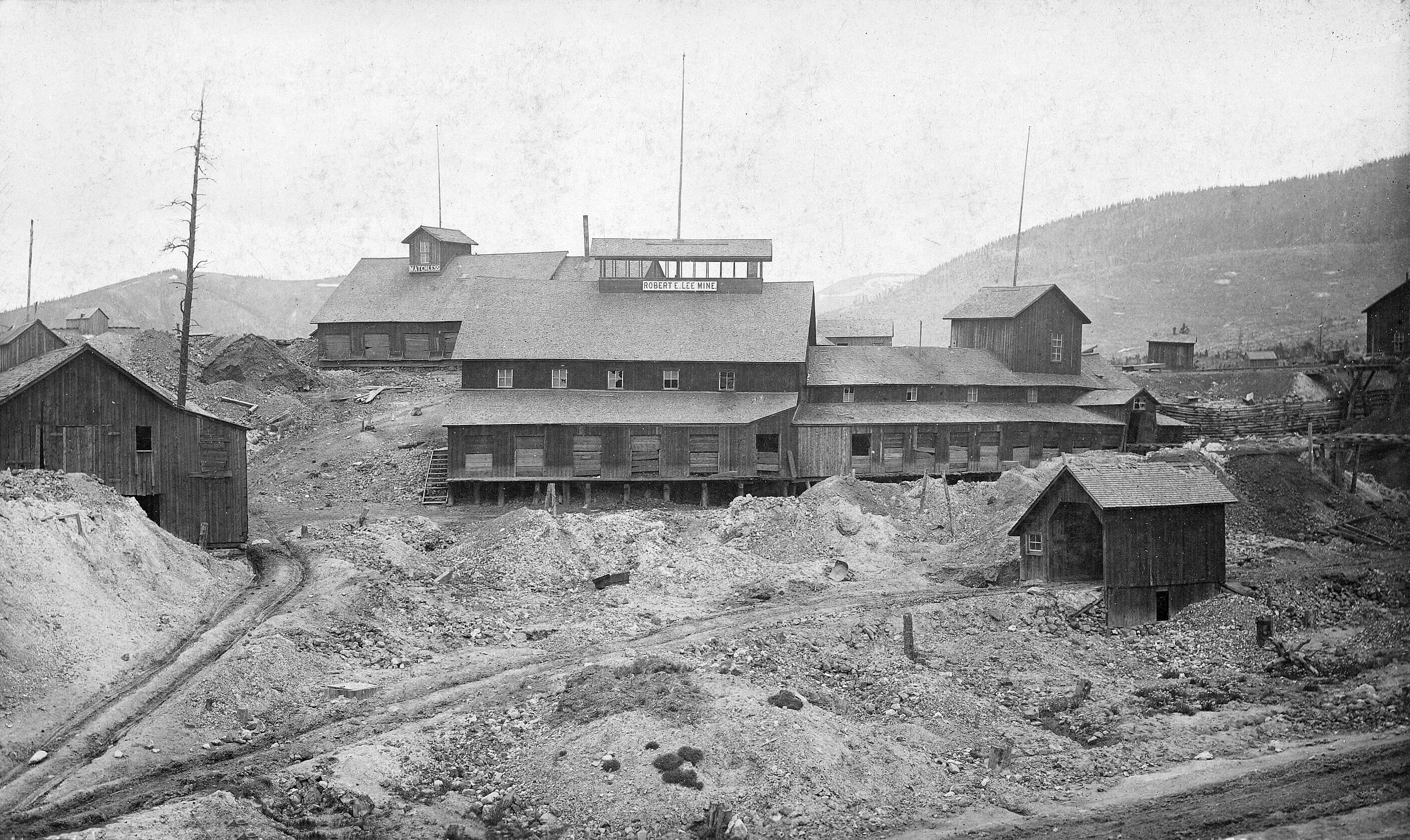
Robert E. Lee Mine in Leadville. Photo by William Henry Jackson.

=== Inhabited Places ===
- Breckenridge

=== Schools ===
- Keenesburg: Weld Central Senior High School and Weld Central Middle School share the Weld Central Rebel, a Civil-war-era-soldier which used to appear with depictions of Confederate flags. School teams are named Rebels.

=== Monument ===
- Confederate monument Riverside Cemetery, Denver (1973)

=== Mine ===
- Leadville: Robert E. Lee Mine (1878)

== Delaware ==
As of June 24, 2020, there is at least one public space with Confederate monuments in Delaware.

- Georgetown: Delaware Confederate Monument, a private monument built on the grounds of the Georgetown Historical Society, unveiled in 2007.

== District of Columbia ==
As of 24 June 2020, there are at least nine public Confederate monuments in Washington, D.C., mostly in the National Statuary Hall Collection. (See above)

- Albert Pike Memorial (1901): An outdoor statue that is owned by the National Park Service at 3rd and D Streets NW in the Judiciary Square neighborhood of Washington, D.C. Pike was a Confederate General and leading Freemason and is dressed as a Mason in the sculpture. The statue is a "portrait of Albert Pike as a Masonic leader and not as a general in the military." "Eight D.C. elected officials have asked the National Park Service to remove" the statue. On June 19, 2020, protesters tore down the statue and set it on fire as part of the George Floyd protests because of Pike's association with the Confederacy.

== Florida ==
As of 24 June 2020, there are at least 63 public spaces with Confederate monuments in Florida.

An August 2017 meeting of the Florida League of Mayors was devoted to the topic of what to do with Civil War monuments.

=== State capitol ===
- Confederate monument of Leon County, on the grounds of the former Florida State Capitol, the "Old Capitol," now a museum. Erected 1882 by "our country women", moved to current location 1923.

=== State symbol ===
Flag of Florida since 1900

- The current flag of Florida, adopted by popular referendum in 1900, with minor changes in 1985, contains the St. Andrew's Cross. It is believed that the Cross was added in memory of, and showing support for, the Confederacy. Others instead say there is no link with the Confederacy, but that the saltire recalls the Cross of Burgundy, the emblem of New Spain. However, the addition of the Cross was proposed by Governor Francis P. Fleming, a former Confederate soldier, who was strongly committed to racial segregation.

=== State holiday ===
- In Florida, Robert E. Lee's birthday (January 19), Confederate Memorial Day (April 26), and Jefferson Davis's birthday (June 3) are legal holidays.

=== Monuments ===
==== Courthouse monuments ====
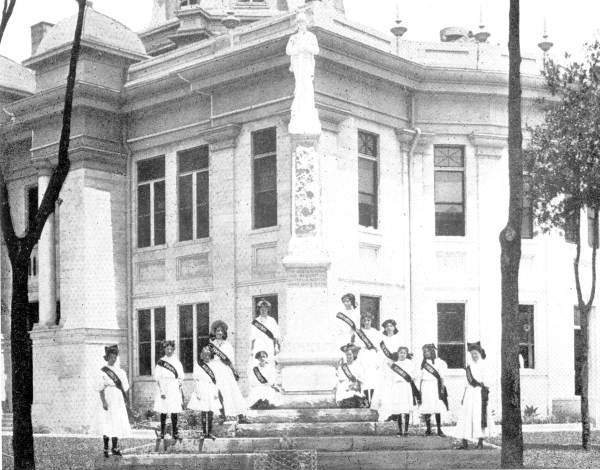
Unveiling of Confederate Monument, Ocala, 1908

- Bartow: 7th Florida Infantry Regiment Monument, Old Polk County Courthouse (1982)
- Brooksville: Confederate Soldiers' Memorial, Hernando County Courthouse (1916)
- Defuniak Springs: Florida's First Confederate Monument, Walton County Courthouse (1871, historic marker nearby)
- Marianna:
  - Battle of Marianna Monument, Jackson County Courthouse lawn (1924)
  - Confederate monument, Jackson County Courthouse lawn (1881)
- Monticello: Confederate monument, Jefferson County Courthouse (1899)
- Ocala: Confederate monument, erected on the grounds of the Marion County Courthouse (1908, moved to Veterans Memorial Park and rededicated 2011). The Confederate flag that flew in front of the Marion County Courthouse was to be moved to "elsewhere on the campus".
- Tampa: The monument Memoria in Aeterna was funded by the city of Tampa and the DOC starting in 1903 and was erected in 1911 at the Hillsborough County Courthouse. In 2017 it was proposed to move it to a private cemetery in Brandon, Florida.

==== Other public monuments ====
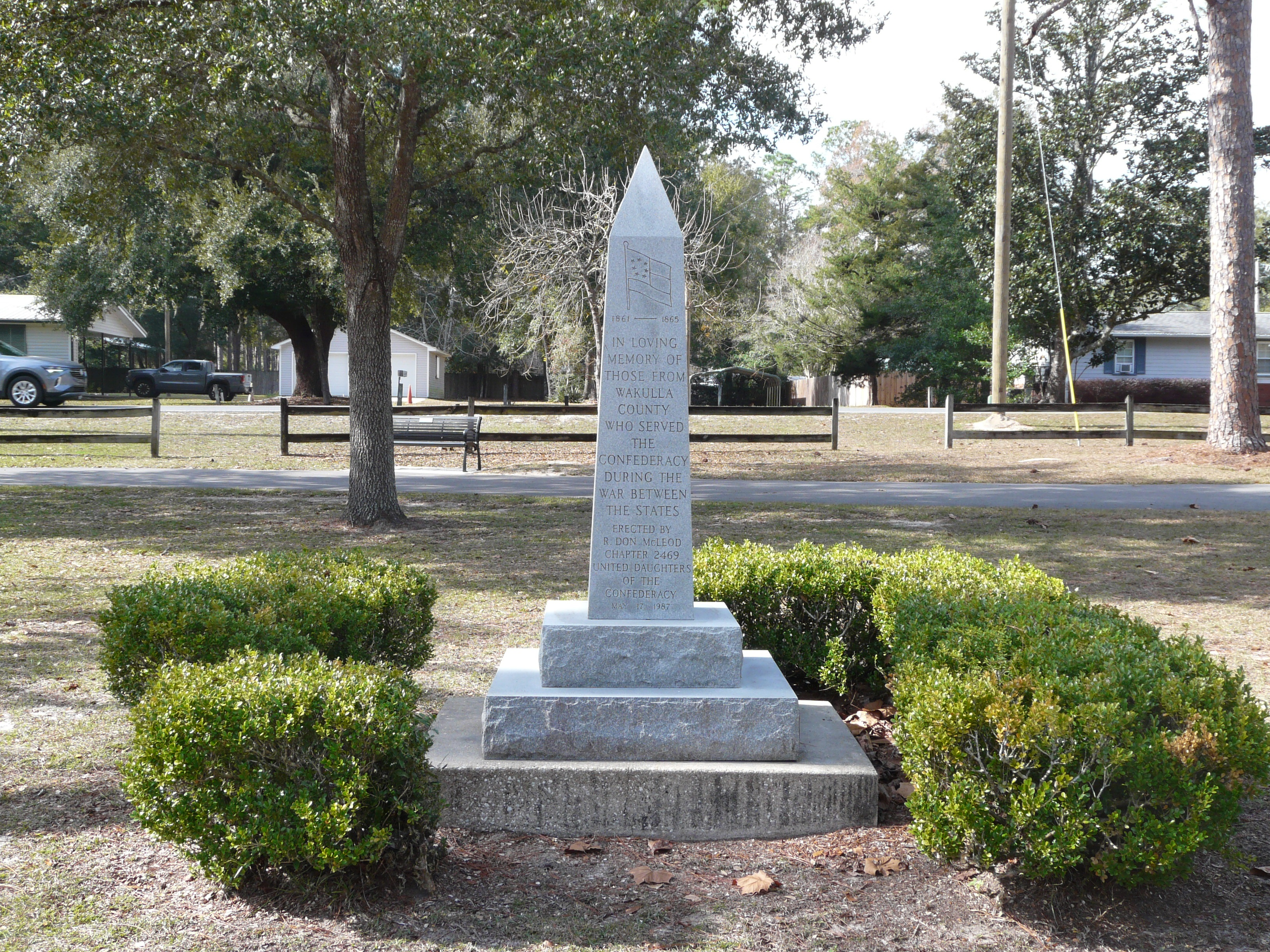
Monument in Crawfordville, Florida

- Crawfordville, Florida, Wakulla County:
  - Confederate Monument (1987): This white obelisk is located in Hudson Park. It is inscribed on one side with an image of a Confederate flag and the words: "1861–1865. In loving memory of those from Wakulla County who served the Confederacy during the war between the states. Erected by the R. Don McLeod Chapter 2469 United Daughters of the Confederacy May 17, 1987."
- Daytona Beach:
  - Confederate Sun Dial Monument (1961) Originally a marble base and column topped with a sundial (by the early 1980s all that remained was its base and its bronze plaque). Dedicated to the Confederate dead. Erected by United Daughters of the Confederacy in 1961. Plaque was removed by the City of Daytona Beach in 2017 after violent clashes in Charlottesville, Virginia over their Robert E. Lee monument. Was to be given to Halifax Historical Museum.
  - Two other bronze plaques were erected in Riverfront Park by the Sons of Confederate Veterans in 1979 and 1985, which listed the names of Confederate veterans buried in East Volusia County. They were mounted on a long granite wall with other plaques commemorating various US wars. They were also removed by the city in 2017 to also be given to the Halifax Historical Museum.
  - Confederate Boulder Monument (1979)

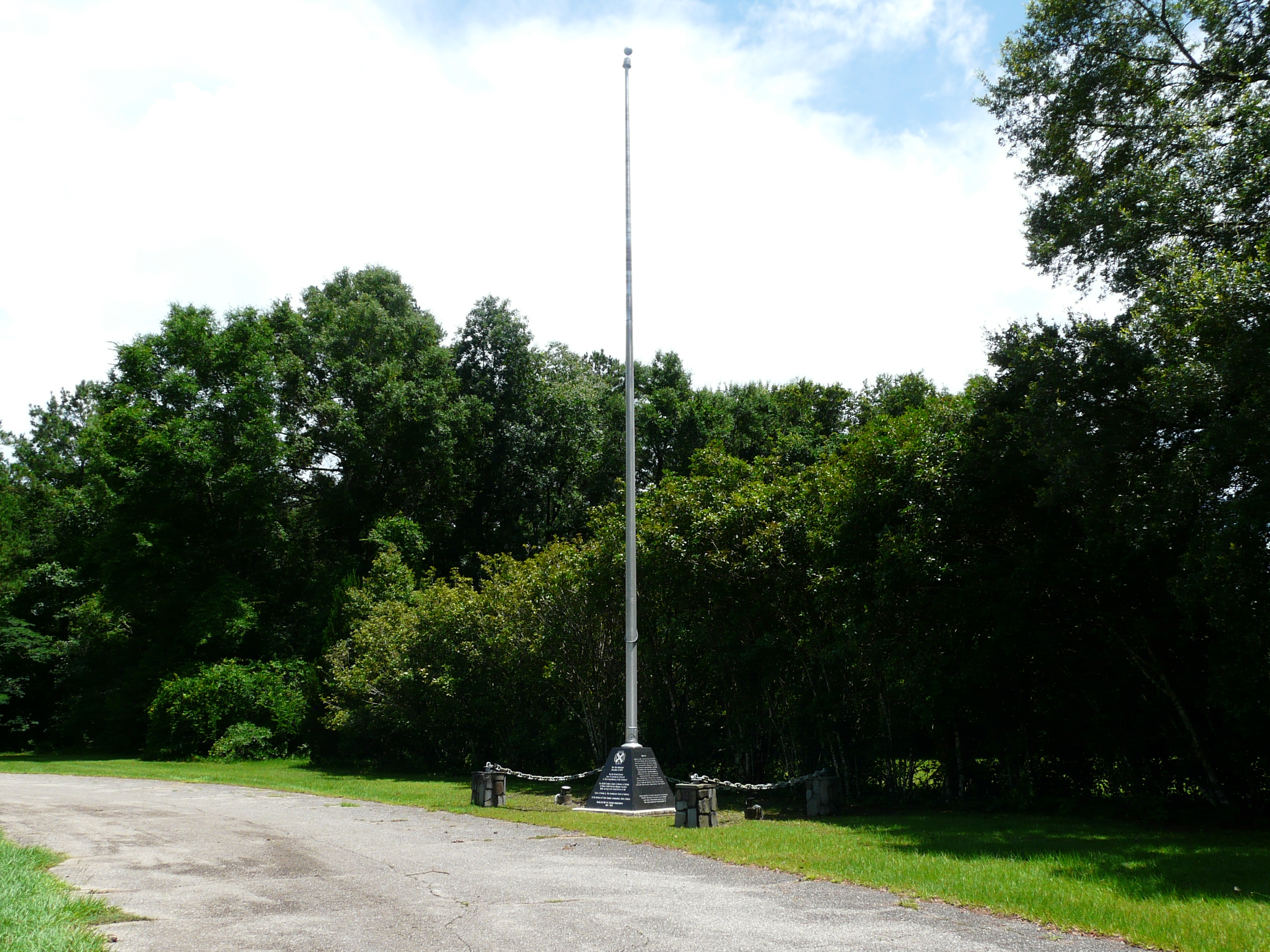
Memorial in Darsey, Florida

- Darsey, Florida, Gadsden County:
  - Sons of Confederate Veterans memorial located on U.S. Route 27.
- Dixie County: American Veteran Monument, Highway 98 west of Old Town, dedicated to Confederate veterans (c. 2005)
- Jefferson County, Florida: Monument to Stonewall Jackson
- Ellenton:
  - Confederate Veterans Memorial Monument, Gamble Plantation Historic State Park (1937)
  - Judah P. Benjamin Confederate Memorial at Gamble Plantation Historic State Park, established 1925, pursuant to agreement between UDC and State of Florida. Benjamin was Attorney General, then Secretary of War, then Secretary of State of the Confederacy. Also serves as home to Florida Division of UDC.
- Fernandina Beach: Statue of David Levy Yulee.

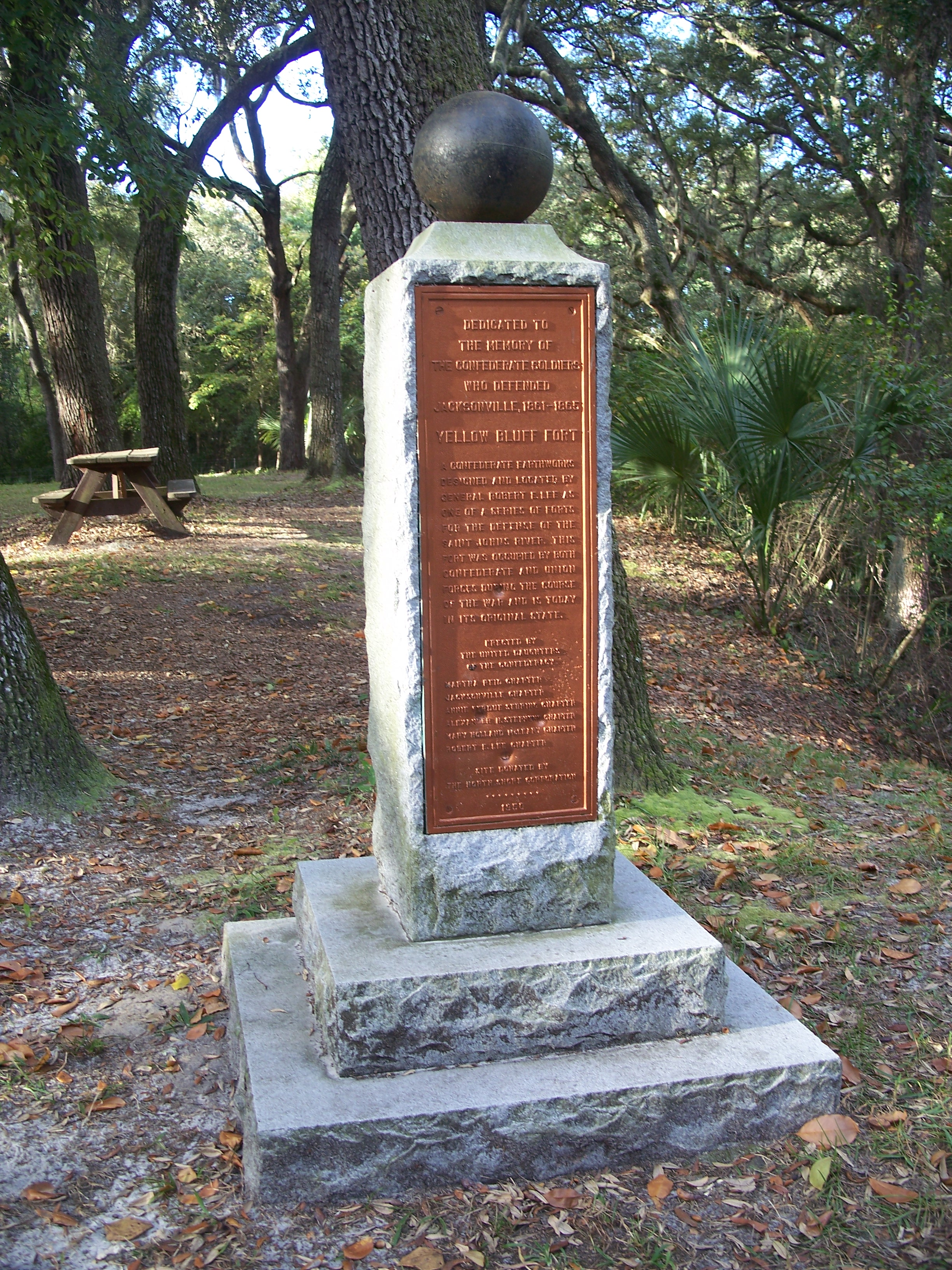
Yellow Bluff Fort Monument

- Jacksonville:
  - Confederate Park. It opened in 1907 as Dignan Park, named for a former chairman of the city's Board of Public Works. In 1914, the park was chosen as the location of the annual reunion of the United Confederate Veterans. The UCV chose the park as the location for a new monument to honor the Women of the Southland, and five months after the reunion the city renamed the park "Confederate Park."
  - Florida's Tribute to the Women of the Confederacy, in Confederate Park (1915). The sculptor was Allen George Newman.
  - Confederate monument, downtown Hemming Park (1898) "The president of Jacksonville City Council, Anna Lopez Brosche, called for all Confederate monuments to be moved from city property to a museum. The most prominent Confederate memorial in Jacksonville is a statue of a Confederate soldier that sits atop a towering pillar in Hemming Park."
  - Yellow Bluff Fort Monument, Yellow Bluff Fort Historic State Park (1951)
- Key West:
  - Confederate memorial fence at Clinton Square, built by J.V. Harris circa 1866.
  - Confederate memorial pavilion at Bayview Park (1924) by UDC.
  - Mallory Square named after Stephen R. Mallory
- Lake City: Confederate Dead of Battle of Olustee, town square in front of the Columbia County Courthouse (1928)

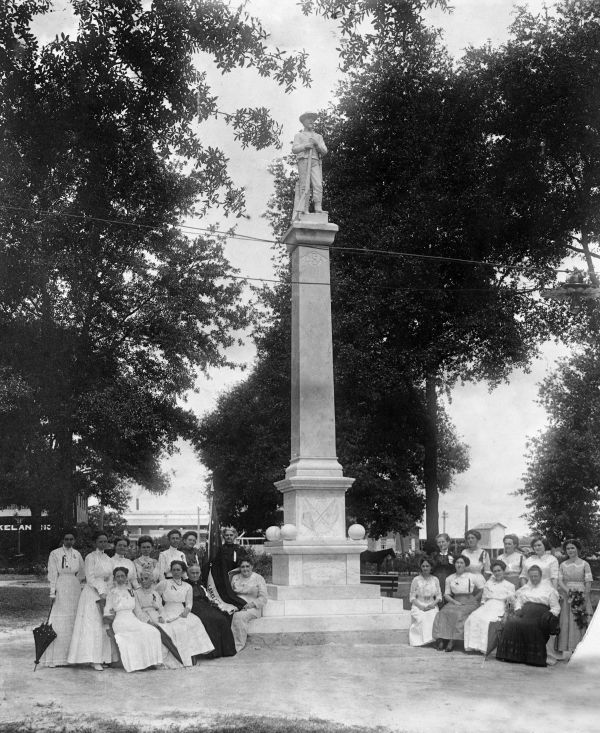
United Daughters of the Confederacy members seated around a Confederate monument in Lakeland, 1915

- Madison: Confederate monument, Four Freedoms Park (1909). Lists names of men who died from county. Nearby sits a monument to former slaves in the county.
- Miami: Confederate monument, Confederate Circle in City Cemetery (1914 at the Dade County Courthouse, was moved to cemetery in 1927)

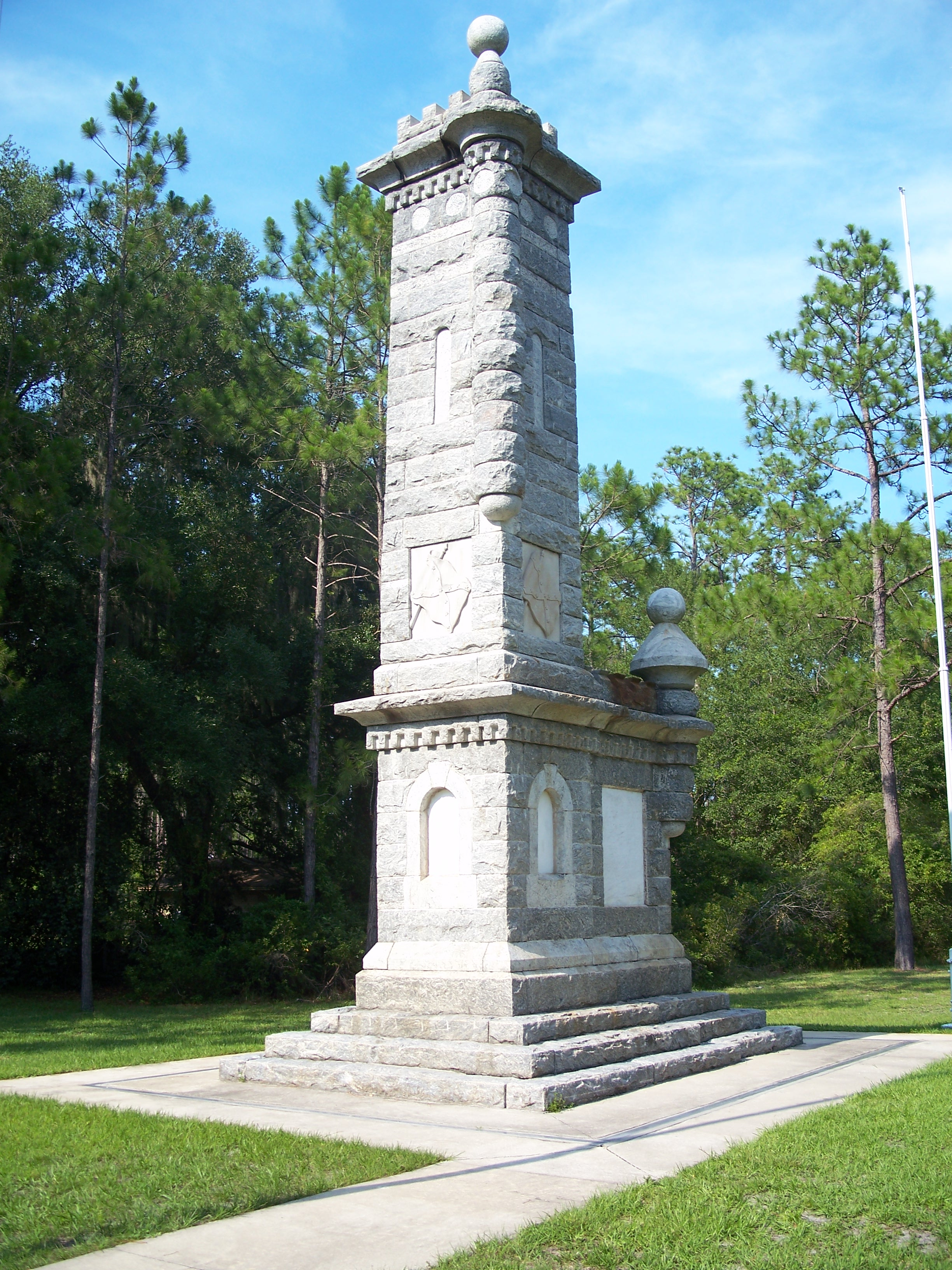
Olustee Battlefield Historic State Park

- Olustee:
  - Battlefield monument, Olustee Battlefield Historic State Park (1912). Inscription: Here was fought on February 20, 1864, the Battle of Ocean Pond under the immediate command of General Alfred Holt Colquitt, "Hero of Olustee." This decisive engagement prevented a Sherman-like invasion of Georgia from the south. Erected April 20, 1936, by the Alfred Holt Colquitt Chapter, United Daughters of the Confederacy Ga. Div.
  - CSA Brigadier General Joseph Finnegan Monument, Olustee Battlefield Historic State Park (1912). "Placed by The United Daughters of the Confederacy Florida Division In Memory of Brig. Gen. Joseph Finegan Commander of the District of Middle and East Florida So well did he perform his part that a signal victory over the Federals was won in the Battle of Olustee Feb. 20, 1864"
- Pensacola:
  - Florida Square was renamed Lee Square in 1889.
  - A 50-foot monument to Our Confederate Dead, erected in 1891, is in Lee Square. It commemorates Jefferson Davis, Pensacolian Confederate veterans Stephen R. Mallory (Secretary of the Confederate Navy) and Edward Aylesworth Perry (Confederate General and Governor of Florida 1885–1889), and "the Uncrowned Heroes of the Southern Confederacy." The mayor of Pensacola has called for its removal.
- Perry: Confederate monument, Taylor County Sports Complex (2007)
- Quincy: Confederate memorial, Soldiers Cemetery within Eastern Cemetery, part of the town's National Register Historic District (2010). The memorial also notes the restoration of the historic fence.
- St. Augustine:
  - Confederate monument, on the Plaza de la Constitución (1879). "The Confederate Memorial Contextualization Advisory Committee, a seven-member task force comprised mostly of historians", in 2018 recommended to the City Commission that the monument be kept, with the addition of "some necessary context".
- St. Cloud: Confederate monument, Veterans Park (2006)
- St. Petersburg: Confederate monument, Greenwood Cemetery (1900)
- Tampa: There is a stained-glass window donated by the United Daughters of the Confederacy in 1906 in honor of Father Abram Ryan, called "Poet of the Confederacy", in the Sacred Heart Catholic Church.
- Trenton: Confederate monument, across from Gilchrist County Courthouse in Veterans' Park (2010)
- Woodville: In Loving Memory Monument, Natural Bridge Battlefield Historic State Park (1922) A plaque placed at the base of the monument in 2000 lists the names of those who died as a result of the battle.

==== Private monuments ====
- Alachua: Confederate monument, Newnansville Cemetery (2002) by the Alachua Lions Club
- Bradfordville, unincorporated community in Leon County: Robert E. Lee Monument, dedicated along Highway 319 in 1927 by UDC. Moved in the 1960s and 1990s, it is now located about a mile south of the Georgia border.
- Dade City: Confederate memorial, Townsend House Cemetery (2010)
- Deland: Confederate Veteran Memorial, Oakdale Cemetery (1958)
- Kissimmee: Granite obelisk in Rose Hill Cemetery, dedicated to Confederate veterans buried in Osceola County with their names listed on the monument. Erected 2002 by Sons of Confederate Veterans.
- Lake City:
  - Last Confederate War Widow, Oaklawn Cemetery, erected after her death in 1985. The memorial and the cemetery are along the Florida Civil War Heritage Trail.
  - Our Confederate Dead, Oaklawn Cemetery (1901, rededicated 1996). A tall obelisk in memory of the unnamed soldiers who died at the nearby Battle of Olustee or in the town's Confederate hospital. The cemetery is the focal point of the opening of Lake City's annual Olustee Battle Festival.
- Leesburg: Memorial fountain made of rustic limestone, in Lone Oak Cemetery. Erected 1935 by United Daughters of the Confederacy but dedicated to soldiers of all wars. An adjacent 20-foot flagpole and inscribed granite block dedicated to Civil War veterans buried there was erected by the United Daughters of the Confederacy in 2005.
- Ormond Beach: 2011; Pilgrim's Rest Cemetery. Monument consists of a flagpole and a concrete base with an attached bronze Southern Cross of Honor and a granite slab listing the names of Confederate veterans buried there. Erected by Confederate Sons Association of Florida.
- Oxford: Upright granite slab monument in Pine Level Cemetery, listing the names of Confederate veterans buried in the cemetery. Erected 2007 by Sons of Confederate Veterans.
- White Springs: Confederate monument and large flag, along Interstate 75 (2002)

=== Inhabited places ===
==== Counties ====
- Baker County (1861), named for James McNair Baker, a lawyer and judge who was a Confederate States of America Senator from Florida.
- Bradford County (1861), named for Captain Richard Bradford, who was killed in the Battle of Santa Rosa Island, becoming the first Confederate officer from Florida to die during the Civil War.
- Hendry County (1923), named for Francis Asbury Hendry, a Confederate Captain and one of the first settlers in the area.
- Lee County (1887), named for Robert E. Lee.
- Levy County (1845), named for David Levy Yulee, a Florida businessman, senator, and strong supporter of slavery, who withdrew from the U.S. Senate in 1861 and served nine months in prison after the Civil War for supporting the Confederacy.
- Pasco County (1887), named for Samuel Pasco, who fought for the CSA but spent much of the war as a prisoner of war. Pasco later became a state representative and US Senator from Florida.

==== Municipalities ====
- Bartow (1862), previously Reidsville, renamed for CSA Col. Francis Bartow.
- Brooksville, previously Pierceville, took on its present name in 1856, to honor and show support for Preston Brooks, a pro-slavery congressman from South Carolina who caned and seriously injured Massachusetts Senator and abolitionist Charles Sumner.
- Fort Myers, previously Fort Harvie, named for Abraham Myers, Quartermaster General of the Confederate Army.
- Lee: named for Robert E. Lee.
- Mayo, named for CSA Col. James Mayo.
- Perry (1875), named for Florida Governor and CSA Col. Madison Starke Perry.
- Starke. The origin of the name is unknown. A prominent theory is that it was named in honor of Madison Starke Perry, fourth governor of Florida and a Confederate States Army colonel. The Division of Historical Resources of the Florida Department of State adds that the city may have been named for "Thomas Starke, a slaveholder who once owned much land around the area."
- Titusville (1873), previously Sand Point, renamed by CSA Col. Henry T. Titus, who also supplied Confederate troops.
- Yulee (1893), named for David Levy Yulee, a supporter of slavery and secession. See Levy County, above.

=== Parks ===
- Ellenton: Judah P. Benjamin Confederate Memorial at Gamble Plantation Historic State Park (1925)
- Fort Walton Beach: Heritage Park preserves the Confederate Camp Walton named for the county it was located in.
- Jacksonville:
  - Confederate Park, opened in 1907. Originally named Dignan Park, the park was renamed when UCV chose the locale as the site for their annual reunions in 1914. -now Springfield Park.
  - Hemming Park/Hemming Plaza (1899) renamed in honor of Civil War veteran Charles C. Hemming, after he installed a 62-foot (19 m)-tall Confederate monument in the park in 1898. -now James Weldon Johnson Park.
  - Hemming Park station an elevated rail station taking its name from the park. Now James Weldon Johnson Park Station.
- Miami: Robert E. Lee Park, the athletic field of Jose de Diego Middle School which replaced Robert E. Lee Middle School (1924–1989) in the Wynwood neighborhood in 1999. A school district spokesman has said the name is not official and requested agencies with incorrect listings update them. As of 2024, Google Maps has changed the park’s name to Jose de Diego Park.
- Pensacola: Lee Square (1889) -now Florida Square.
- Tampa: Confederate Memorial Park, opened 2008 by the Sons of Confederate Veterans.

=== Roads ===
- Stonewall Jackson Memorial Highway, designated by UDC. Chapters placed the following markers in the state:
  - Capps: Along U.S. Route 19 in 1940.
  - St. Petersburg: Terminus marker at the intersection of Central Avenue and Bayshore Drive in 1939.
    Removed by the city August 15, 2017.
- Hilliard: General Lee Road
- Jacksonville
  - Confederate Point Road
  - Confederate Street
  - General Lee Road
- Naples: Confederate Drive
- Orlando
  - Kirby Smith Road
  - Stonewall Jackson Road-renamed
- Pensacola: Confederate Drive
- Perry: North Jeff Davis Avenue
- St. Cloud: Robert Lee Road
- Stuart: Southeast General Lee Terrace
- Tampa: Robert E. Lee Road
- Zephyrhills:
  - Jeff Davis Drive
  - Jubal Early Road

=== Schools and libraries ===
- Gainesville:
  - J.J. Finley Elementary School (1939), named for CSA Brig. Gen. Jesse J. Finley. -now Carolyn Beatrice Parker Elementary School.
  - Kirby-Smith Center (1939), Alachua County Public Schools administrative offices. Constructed in 1900, the building was initially the all white Gainesville Graded & High School. In August 2017, the school board announced plans to rename the center.
  - Sidney Lanier School. Lanier was a Confederate soldier and poet.
- Hillsborough County: Robert E. Lee Elementary School aka Lee Elementary Magnet School of World Studies and Technology was built 1906 and named for Lee in 1943. A school board member pushing for a rename in 2017 noted that had Lee's army won the war "a majority of our students would be slaves." -now Tampa Heights Elementary Magnet School.
- Jacksonville
  - J.E.B. Stuart Middle School (1966), named for CSA Gen. J. E. B. Stuart. -now Westside Middle School.
  - Jefferson Davis Middle School (1961) -now Charger Academy.
  - Kirby-Smith Middle School (1924), named for CSA Gen. Edmund Kirby Smith. -now Springfield Middle School.
  - Robert E. Lee High School (1928) -now Riverside High School.
  - Stonewall Jackson Elementary School -now Hidden Oaks Elementary School.
- Orlando:
  - Robert E. Lee Middle School, renamed College Park Middle School in 2017.
  - Stonewall Jackson Middle School was renamed Roberto Clemente Middle School in 2020, as was the road in front of the school.
- Pensacola: Escambia High School's Rebel mascot riots, 1972–1977. Before a noncontroversial name was chosen, protests and violence occurred at the school and in the community, crosses were burned on school district members' lawns, lawsuits were filed, and the Ku Klux Klan held a rally and petitioned the school board.
- Tampa: Lee Elementary School of Technology / World Studies (1906). The school's mascot is Robert E. Lee's horse Traveller. In July 2015, students asked the school board to change the school's name. In June 2017, a board member asked the board to consider the name change. -now Tampa Heights Elementary School

=== City symbols ===
- Hillsborough County: until 1997, the Hillsborough County seal included the Confederate Battle Flag.
- Panama City: city flag is quite similar to the Florida state flag with a white background and the St Andrews cross echoing the Confederate Battle Flag, but with the city seal replacing the state seal.

=== City holiday ===
- On April 2, 2019, Ocala mayor Kent Guinn signed a declaration declaring that April 26, 2019, would be Confederate Memorial Day. He said he has done so in previous years.

=== County holiday ===
- In 2016, the Commission of Marion County (county seat Ocala) declared April as Confederate History Month.

== Georgia ==
As of June 24, 2020, there are at least 201 public spaces with Confederate monuments in Georgia.

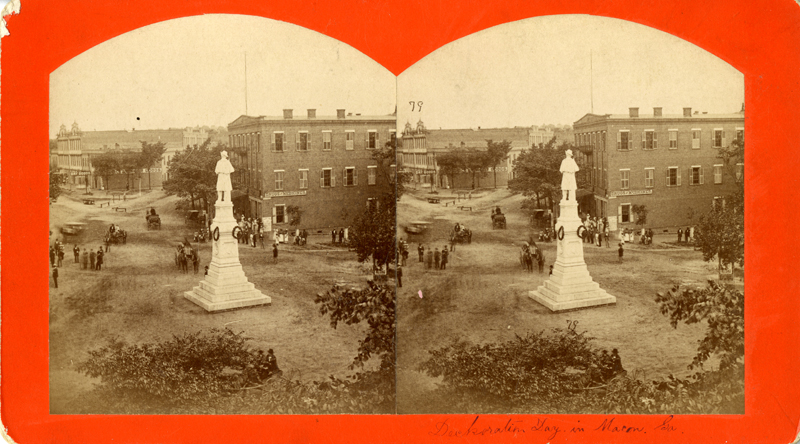
Confederate monument in Macon, Ga on Mulberry street circa 1877

== Hawaii ==
- A plaque in the National Memorial Cemetery of the Pacific commemorates Hawaiians who fought for the Union, as well as Hawaiians who fought for the Confederacy.

== Idaho ==
The settlement of Idaho coincided with the Civil War and settlers from Southern states memorialized the Confederacy with the names of several towns and natural features.

As of June 24, 2020, there are at least three public spaces with Confederate monuments in Idaho.

=== Inhabited places ===
- Atlanta: unincorporated, and its Atlanta Airport. The area was named by Southerners after reports of a Confederate victory over Gen. Sherman in the Battle of Atlanta, which turned to be wholly false, but the name stuck.
- Confederate Gulch: unincorporated former mining community.
- Grayback Gulch: unincorporated former mining community, settled by Confederate soldiers and named for the color of their uniforms. Now a U.S. Forest Service campground.
- Leesburg: an unincorporated former goldmining town settled by southerners and named for Robert E. Lee.

=== Natural features and recreation ===
- Located within Boise National Forest in Elmore County are:
  - Robert E. Lee Campground, now dispersed
  - Robert E Lee Creek
- Chattanooga Hot Springs, near Atlanta, ID
- Secesh (Successionist) Summit and Secesh River

== Illinois ==
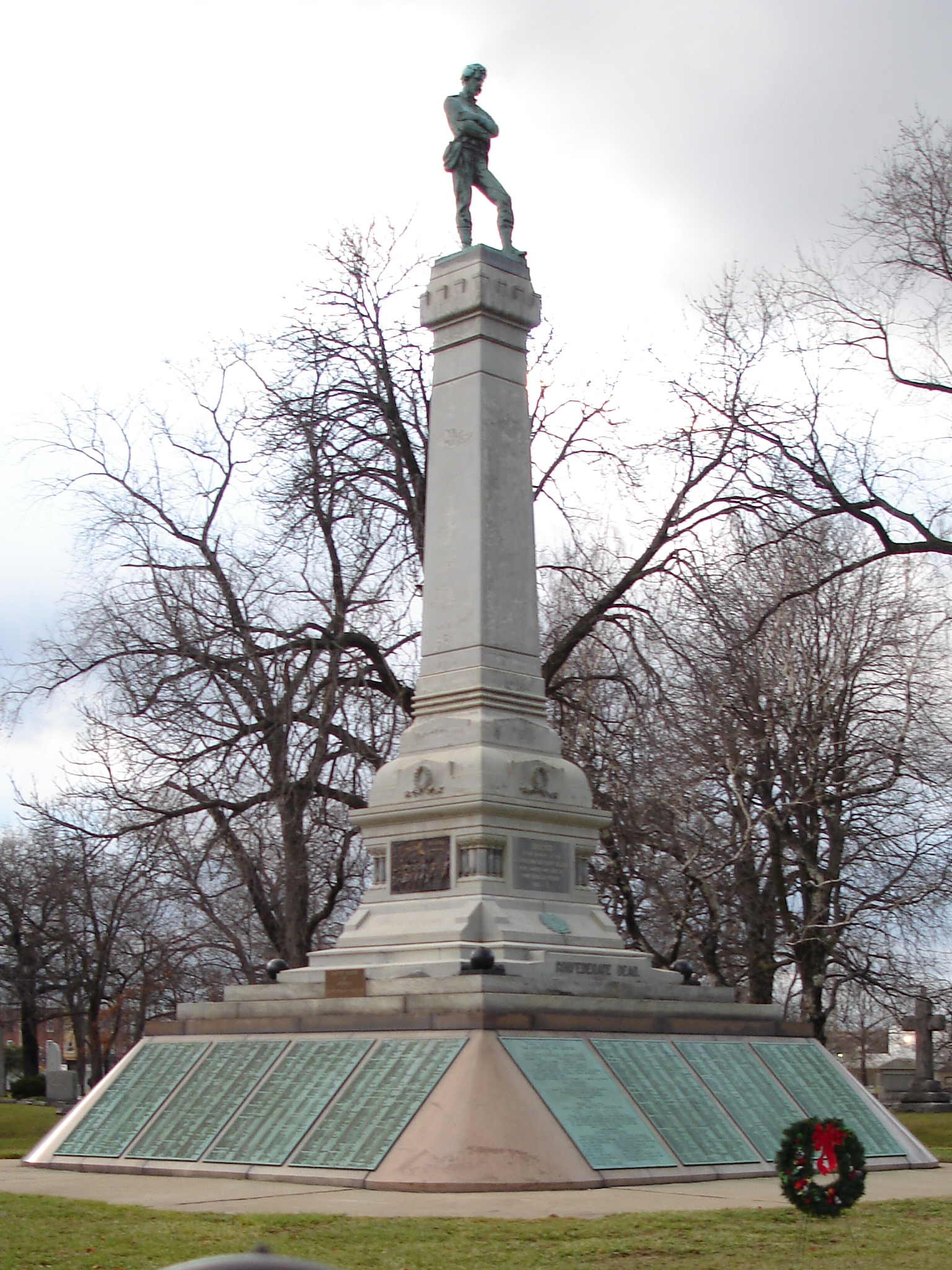
Confederate Monument at Oak Woods Cemetery in Chicago

The four memorials in Illinois are in federal government cemeteries and connected with prisoners of war.

=== Federal cemeteries ===
- Alton: UDC monument (1909), North Alton Confederate Cemetery. Dedicated to Confederate soldiers who died at Alton Military Prison As of October 2018, it is one of 7 cemeteries with Confederate monuments that the Veterans Administration has under 24-hour guard.
- Rock Island: UDC obelisk (2003), Rock Island Confederate Cemetery. Dedicated to Confederate soldiers who died at Rock Island Military Prison
- Springfield: UDC/SCV monument (2005), Camp Butler National Cemetery. Dedicated to Confederate soldiers who died at Camp Butler.

=== Federal plot within private cemetery ===
- Chicago: Confederate Mound (1895), Oak Woods Cemetery. Mass grave and monument dedicated to Confederate soldiers who died at Camp Douglas. As of October 2018, the Veterans Administration has it under dawn to dusk guard. It is No. 7 on the Make It Right Project's 2018 list of the 10 Confederate monuments it most wants removed. A counter memorial, a large black granite cenotaph was erected nearby in 1896, dedicated to abolitionists and unionists of the pre-war South.

== Indiana ==
As of June 24, 2020, there is at least one public space with Confederate monuments in Indiana.

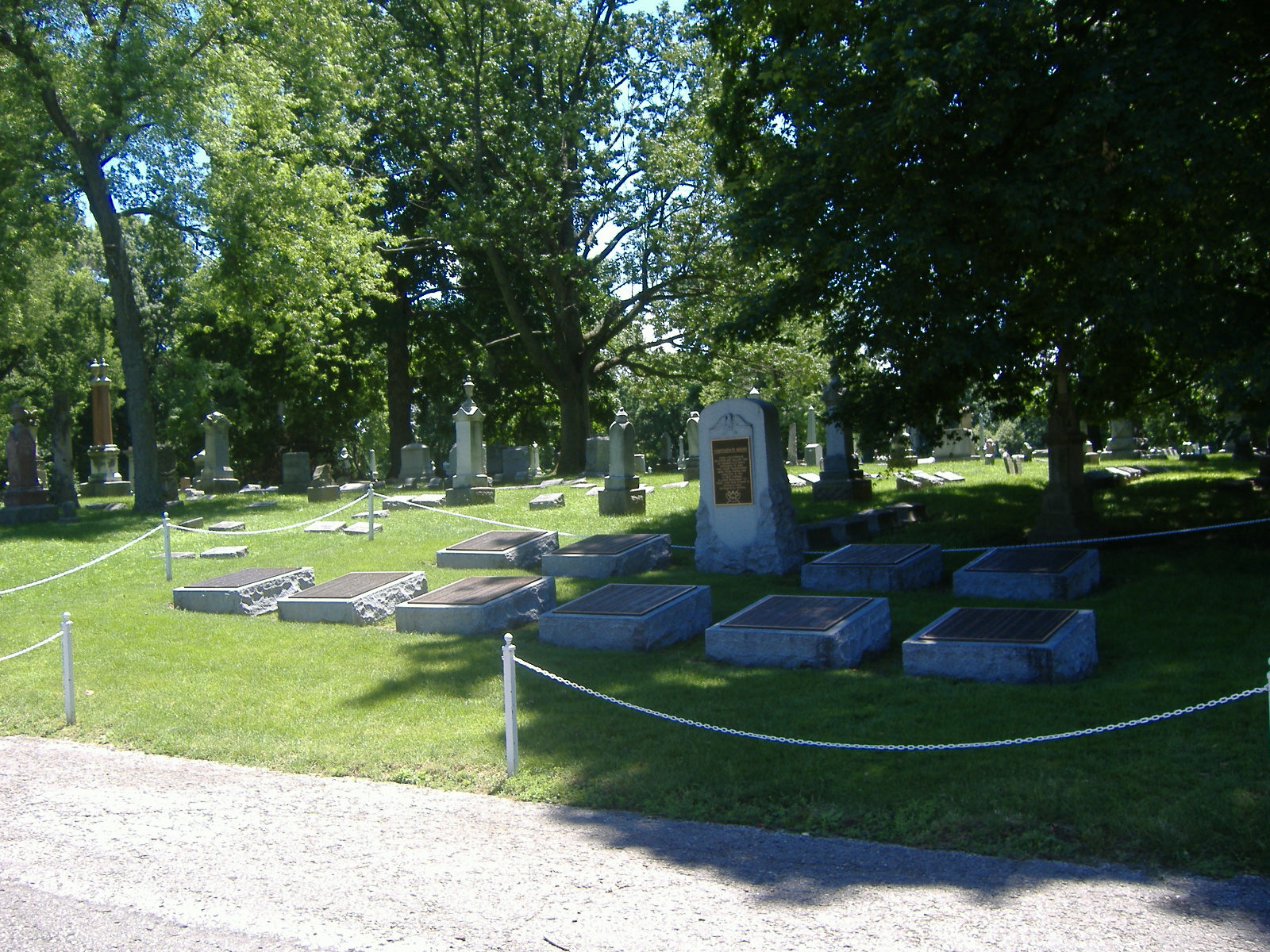
Confederate monument, Crown Hill National Cemetery, Indianapolis

- Multiple locations: There are 27 historical markers/point-of-interest displays marking the route of John Hunt Morgan through Indiana.
- Corydon: Corydon Battle Site is a memorial to both sides that fought in the Battle of Corydon, the only Civil War battle in Indiana. It contains Corydon's Civil War Museum.
- Evansville: The Confederate monument (1904) at Oak Hill Cemetery marks the burial site of 24 Confederate prisoners who died at Evansville.
- Indianapolis:
  - Confederate Soldiers and Sailors Monument, Garfield Park, erected, according to its inscription, "to mark the burial place of 1616 Confederate soldiers and sailors who died here as prisoners of war and whose graves cannot now be identified." Following protests of the murder of George Floyd in June 2020, the city announced plans to remove the monument.
  - A granite monument was erected in 1933 at Crown Hill National Cemetery, a burial site for Confederate prisoners who died at Camp Morton.
- Terre Haute: Woodlawn Monument Site (1912), Woodlawn Cemetery. Erected by the Federal Government to commemorate 11 Confederate soldiers who died in a local prison camp.
- Versailles: Versailles is the location of a skirmish with Morgan's Raiders. South Ripley High School named their mascot the Raiders in honor of John Hunt Morgan's campaign across Indiana.

== Iowa ==
As of June 24, 2020, there is at least one public space with Confederate monuments in Iowa.

- Bentonsport: Monument to Lawrence Sullivan Ross (2007), Iowa's only Confederate general
- Bloomfield: Confederate Invasion of Iowa Monument (2005)

== Kansas ==
Veterans Memorial Park in Wichita, Kansas holds one Confederate and Union monument, a Reconciliation Memorial. "The intent of this memorial is to bring folks together and reconcile their differences,". The Memorial is a small obelisk with text honoring North and South combatants on both sides.

== Kentucky ==
As of 24 June 2020, there are at least 37 public spaces with Confederate monuments in Kentucky.

=== Monuments ===
- Augusta: Confederate Monument, Payne Cemetery, 1903.
- Bardstown: Confederate Monument, Bardstown/St. Joseph's Cemetery, 1903.
- Bowling Green:
  - Confederate Monument of Bowling Green, Fairview Cemetery, 1876.
  - William F. Perry Monument, Fairview Cemetery, 1901.
- Brandenburg: Confederate monument (2016) removed from Louisville Armed protesters surrounded the monument to prevent its removal in June 2020.
- Cadiz: Confederate Monument, Trigg County Courthouse, 1913.
- Covington: Veteran's Monument, Linden Grove Cemetery, 1933. It was dedicated by the American Legion and honors both Confederate and Union veterans.
- Crab Orchard: Confederate Monument, Crab Orchard Cemetery, 1872.
- Cynthiana: Confederate Monument, Battle Grove Cemetery, 1869.
- Danville: Confederate Monument, McDowell Park, 1910.
- Eminence: Confederate Soldiers Martyrs Monument, Eminence Cemetery, 1870.
- Fairview: Confederate monument at the Jefferson Davis Monument State Historic Site, a state park commemorating Davis's birthplace, completed in 1924. It contains a "35-story obelisk."
- Frankfort: Confederate Monument, Frankfort Cemetery, 1892.
- Fulton: Confederate Monument, Fairview Cemetery, 1902.

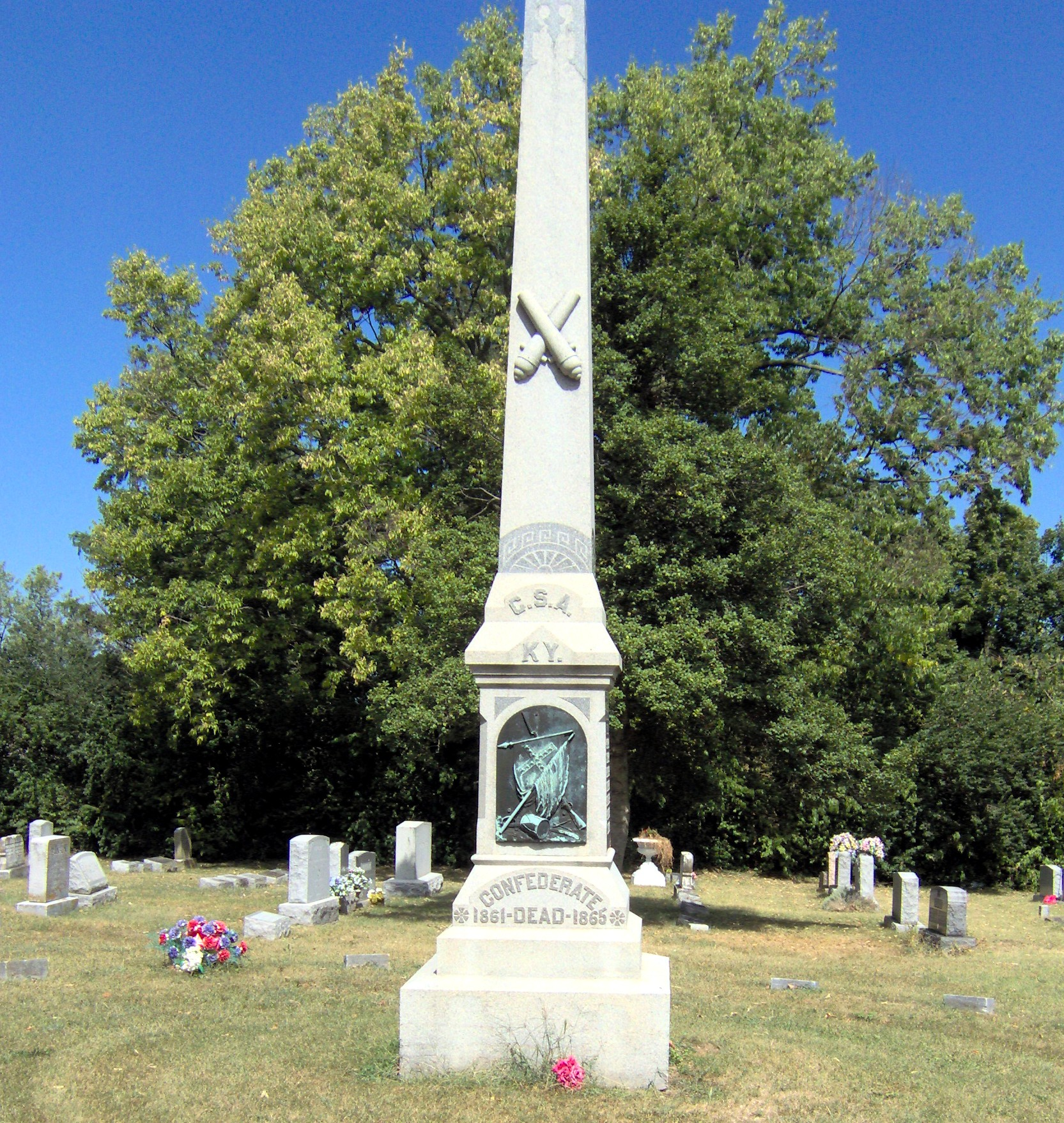
Confederate Monument, Georgetown

- Georgetown: Confederate Monument, Georgetown Cemetery, 1888.
- Graves County: Camp Beauregard Memorial (1909), Camp Beauregard Cemetery. UDC memorial to Confederate soldiers who died at Camp Beauregard "for the Confederate State of America and were denied the glory of heroic service in a battle".
- Glasgow: Confederate Monument, Barren County Courthouse, 1905.

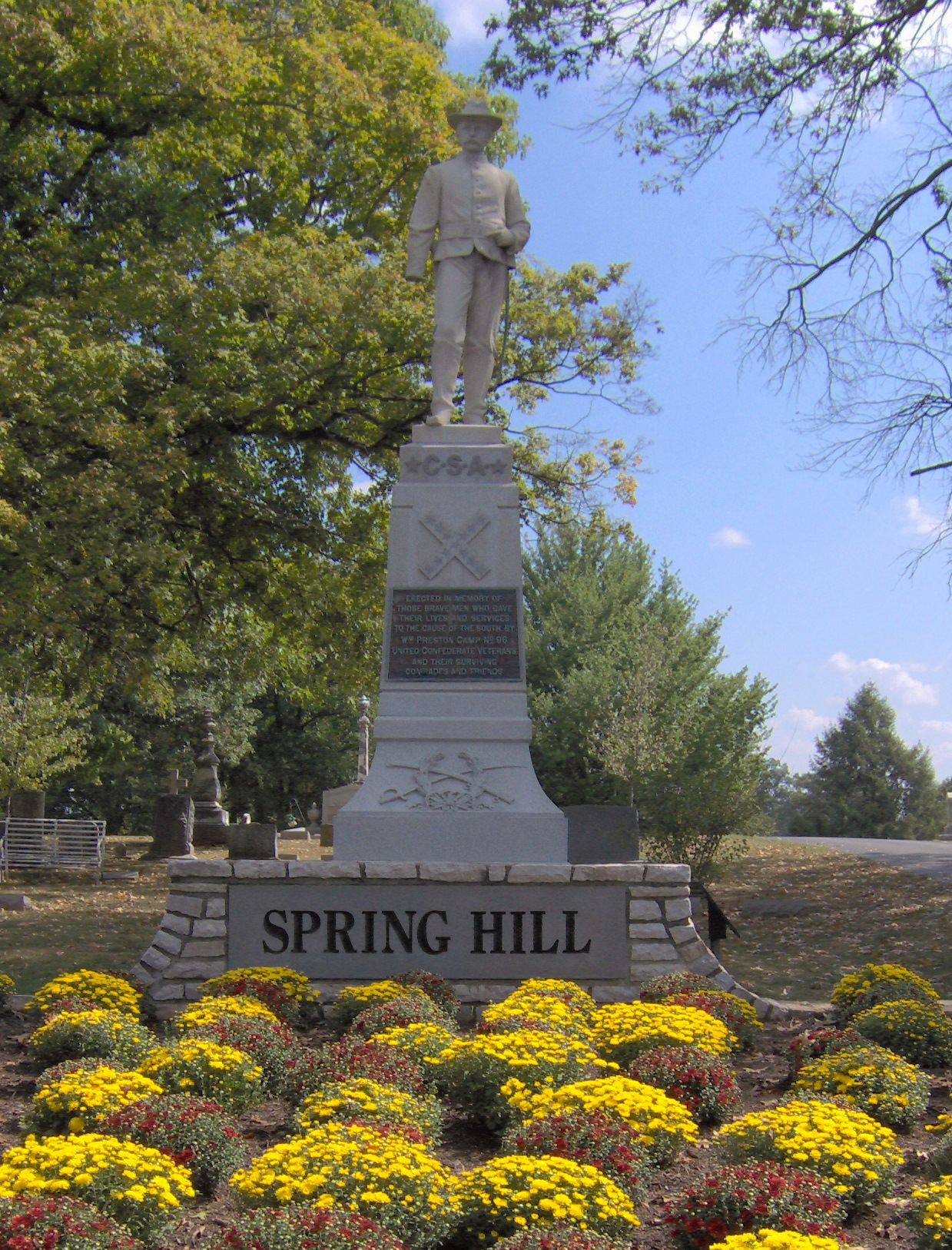
Confederate Monument, Spring Hill Cemetery, Harrodsburg

- Harrodsburg: Confederate Monument, Spring Hill Cemetery, 1902.
- Hickman: Confederate Memorial Gateway, Hickman City Cemetery, 1913.
- Hopkinsville:
  - Confederate Memorial Fountain, Christian County Courthouse, 1911.
  - Latham Confederate Monument, Riverside Cemetery, 1887.
- Horse Cave: Unknown Confederate Soldier Monument, Old Dixie Highway, 1934.
- Jeffersontown: Confederate Martyrs Monument, Jeffersontown City Cemetery, 1904.
- Lawrenceburg: Confederate Monument, Anderson County Courthouse, 1894.
- Lexington:
  - Ladies' Confederate Memorial, Lexington Cemetery, 1874.
  - Confederate Soldier Monument in Lexington, Lexington Cemetery, 1893.
  - John C. Breckinridge Memorial moved from Courthouse to Lexington Cemetery Oct 2017.
  - John Hunt Morgan Memorial moved from Courthouse to Lexington Cemetery October 2017.

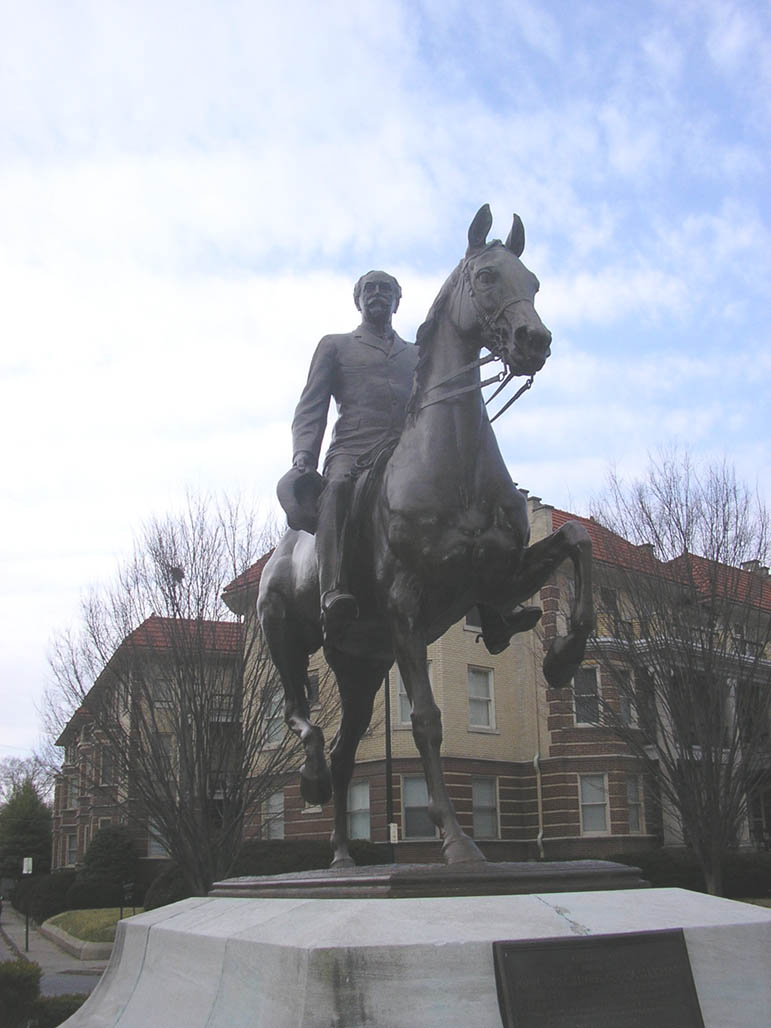
John B. Castleman Monument, Louisville

- Louisville:
  - Confederate Monument, dedicated in 1895 and was placed next to the University of Louisville on city property. It was removed and re-located to a riverfront park in Brandenburg, Kentucky, in December 2016.
- Madisonville: Confederate Monument, Hopkins County Courthouse, 1909.
- Mayfield:
  - Confederate Monument, Graves County Courthouse, 1920.
  - Confederate Monument, Maplewood Cemetery, 1924.
- Maysville: plaque commemorating Albert Sidney Johnston.
- Midway: Martyrs Monument, Midway City Cemetery, 1890.
- Morganfield: Confederate Monument, City Cemetery/Odd Fellows Cemetery, 1870.
- Morgantown: Confederate-Union Veterans' Monument, Butler County Courthouse, 1907.
- Mt. Sterling: Confederate Monument, Machpelan Cemetery, 1880.
- Munfordville: Colonel Robert A. Smith Monument, near the Green River, 1885.
- Murray: Confederate Monument, Calloway County Courthouse, 1917.
- Nancy: General Felix K. Zollicoffer Monument, Zollicoffer Park, Mill Springs Battlefield, 1910.
- Nancy: Confederate Mass Grave Monument, Zollicoffer Park, Mill Springs Battlefield, 1910.
- Nicholasville: Confederate Memorial, Jessamine County Courthouse, 1896.
- Owensboro: Confederate Monument, Daviess County Courthouse, 1900.
- Owingsville: Confederate Monument, Owingsville Cemetery, 1907.

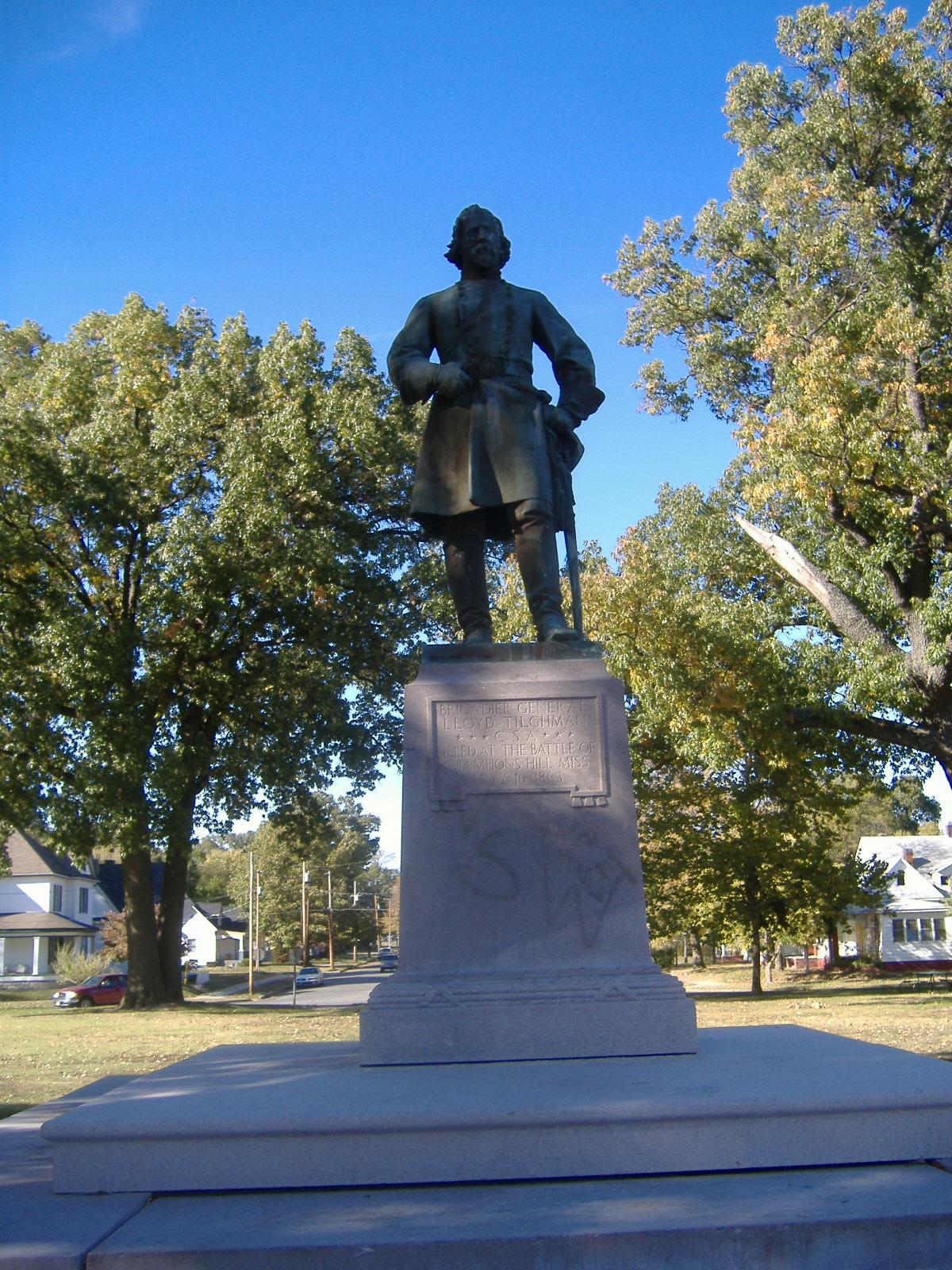
Lloyd Tilghman Statue, Paducah

- Paducah:
  - Confederate Monument, Oak Grove Cemetery, 1907.
  - First Confederate Volunteer From Paducah, marker embedded in city sidewalk.
  - General Lloyd Tilghman Statue, Lang Park, 1909.
- Paris: Bourbon County Confederate Monument, Paris Cemetery, 1887.
- Perryville:
  - Confederate Monument, Perryville Battlefield State Historic Site, 1902. Commissioned by the state of Kentucky.
  - Unknown Confederate Dead Monument, Goodknight Cemetery, 1928.
- Pewee Valley: Pewee Valley Confederate Monument, Pewee Valley Confederate Cemetery, 1904.
- Princeton: Confederate Soldier Monument, Caldwell County Courthouse, 1912.
- Russellville: Confederate Monument, Town Square, 1910.
- Shepherdsville: John Hunt Morgan's Raid Historical Markers (Note: Pair of Kentucky Historic Markers located on KY 61, near bridge crossing at Salt River, near Shepherdsville. Marker #1296, "L & N Bridge in Civil War. Destroyed three times by CSA. Partially razed on Sept. 7, 1862, by troops under Col. John Hutcheson. During the occupation of Shepherdsville, Sept. 28, Braxton Bragg's troops again destroyed it, but new bridge was up by Oct. 11. After Battle of Elizabethtown, Dec. 27, John Hunt Morgan's men moved along tracks, destroying everything on way to trestle works at Muldraugh's Hill." Marker #1413, "Morgan-on to Ohio. July 2, 1863, CSA Gen. J. H. Morgan began raid to prevent USA move to Tenn. and Va. Repulsed at Green River, July 4. Defeated a USA force at Lebanon, July 5. Moved through Bardstown, July 6. After night march, crossed here July 7. Rested troops few hours and proceeded to Brandenburg. Crossed to Indiana, July 8. He continued raid until captured in northeast Ohio, July 26." See also Morgan's Raid.)
- Somerset:
  - Battle of Dutton's Hill Monument (1875) on private property, Old Crab Orchard Road. Kentucky Historical Marker at roadside. (Note: Kentucky Historic Marker located 2 mi. N. of Somerset, KY 39. Marker #712, "March 30, 1863, USA force of 1,250 under General Q. A. Gillmore overtook 1,550 Confederate cavalry under Gen. John Pegram, here. Five-hour battle resulted. CSA driven from one position to another, withdrew during night across Cumberland. Killed, wounded, missing, CSA 200 and USA 30. On nine-day expedition into Ky., CSA had captured 750 cattle and took 537 across river.".)
- Springfield: John Hunt Morgan's Raids Historical Marker (Note: Kentucky Historic Marker located Springfield, US 150, KY 55. Marker #689, erected in 1964, "CSA Gen. John H. Morgan's cavalry moved thru Springfield on raids, July 12 and December 30, 1862. On third raid, into Ohio, after battle of Lebanon, July 5, 1863, Union prisoners brought here but paroled to speed CSA movement. Confederate invasion force of 16,000 here before meeting Union Army in battle at Perryville, Oct. 8, 1862. See map other side.")
- St. Joseph: Thompson and Powell Martyrs Monument, St. Alphonsus Catholic Church Cemetery, 1880.
- Versailles: Confederate Monument, Versailles Cemetery, 1877.
- Winchester: John Hunt Morgan Historical Marker (Note: Kentucky Historic Marker #625, "Morgan's Men Here" located in Winchester, Kentucky on Courthouse lawn, US 60 & KY 627. Inscribed "CSA Gen. John H. Morgan's cavalry first raided Kentucky July, 1862. Took Cynthiana but, faced by large USA forces, withdrew. Destroyed arms here on 19th and went to Richmond. On last raid, June 1864, after two battles at Mt. Sterling, they moved by here to Lexington and to Cynthiana where they met defeat on 12th and retreated to Virginia. See map on other side." Dedicated March 9, 1964. See also Battle of Cynthiana.)

=== Bridge ===
- Cynthiana: The John Hunt Morgan Bridge, on South Main St./U.S. 27, is named for a Confederate general.

=== Inhabited places ===
- Breckinridge Center: a census-designated place in Union County, Kentucky. Named because of nearby Camp Breckinridge, which was named for John C. Breckinridge, U.S. Vice President and Confederate general.
- Lee County (1870)
- Confederate, Kentucky
- Vanceburg, named for Confederate Colonel and North Carolina governor Zebulon Baird Vance. His wife was from Kentucky.

=== Parks ===
- Fairview: Jefferson Davis State Historic Site (1957) the site includes Davis's birthplace, a memorial to Davis that includes a 341 ft obelisk (the second tallest obelisk in the world after the Washington Monument), Confederate flags and other signs and plaques.
- Lexington: A historical marker identifying the approximate site of the birth of Confederate Brigadier General David Rice Atchison is located along Highway 1974 in the Landsdowne neighborhood of Lexington, Kentucky.

=== Roads ===
- Elkton:
  - Jefferson Davis Highway
  - Jefferson Davis Road
- Erlanger:
  - General Ross Drive
  - General Stuart Drive
  - Jefferson Davis Place
  - Robert E. Lee Drive
- Madisonville: Jefferson Davis Drive
- Mayfield: Jeff Davis Road
- Olive Hill: John Hunt Morgan Lane
- Raywick: Robert Lee Road
- Vine Grove: Stand Watie Road

=== Highways ===
- Jefferson Davis Memorial Highway: Marker located in the Fountain Avenue median in Paducah, 1935. The marker is along an auxiliary route that follows U.S. Route 68 from Bowling Green, Kentucky to Paducah, Kentucky.

=== Schools ===
- Bedford: Trimble County High School named their mascot the Raiders, in honor of John Hunt Morgan's men.
- Danville: Boyle County High School uses the Rebels nickname.
- Eastern: Allen Central High School: Allen Central athletic teams are nicknamed the "Rebels." The school features various Confederate iconography
- Atherton High School in Louisville used the Rebels nickname until 2021.
- Florence: Boone County High School uses the Rebels nickname.
- Liberty: Casey County High School uses the Rebels nickname.
- Munfordville: Hart County High School named their mascot the Raiders, in honor of John Hunt Morgan's men. Also, a large mural in the town depicts Morgan.
- Owenton: Owen County High School uses the Rebels nickname.
- Richmond: Eastern Kentucky University. EKU athletic teams are nicknamed the "Colonels," a Confederate figure.
- Todd County Central High School uses the nickname Rebels.

== Louisiana ==
As of 24 June 2020, there are at least 83 public spaces with Confederate monuments in Louisiana.

=== State capitol ===
- Gov. Francis T. Nicholls Statue (1934). Nicholls was a brigadier general in the Confederate Army.
- Gov. Henry Watkins Allen Statue (1934). Allen was a brigadier general in the Confederate Army. He is buried on the Old Louisiana State Capitol grounds.
- "Silent Sentinel" Monument, officially the Confederate Soldiers of East and West Baton Rouge Parishes Memorial. Plinth erected 1886 and statue in 1890. Dedicated by Gov. John McEnery. Original granite and marble plinth cracked; replaced in the 1960s with a small brick plinth that was aesthetically unappealing. Formerly at North Boulevard and 3rd Street, near City Hall. In 2012, to make room for Town Square construction, it was moved to the nearby Old Louisiana State Capitol, now a museum. Plaque reads: "Erected by the men and women of East and West Baton Rouge to perpetuate the heroism and patriotic devotion of the noble soldiers from the two parishes who wore the gray and crossed the river with their immortal leaders to rest under the shade of the trees. Original monument erected 1886 A.D."

=== Buildings ===
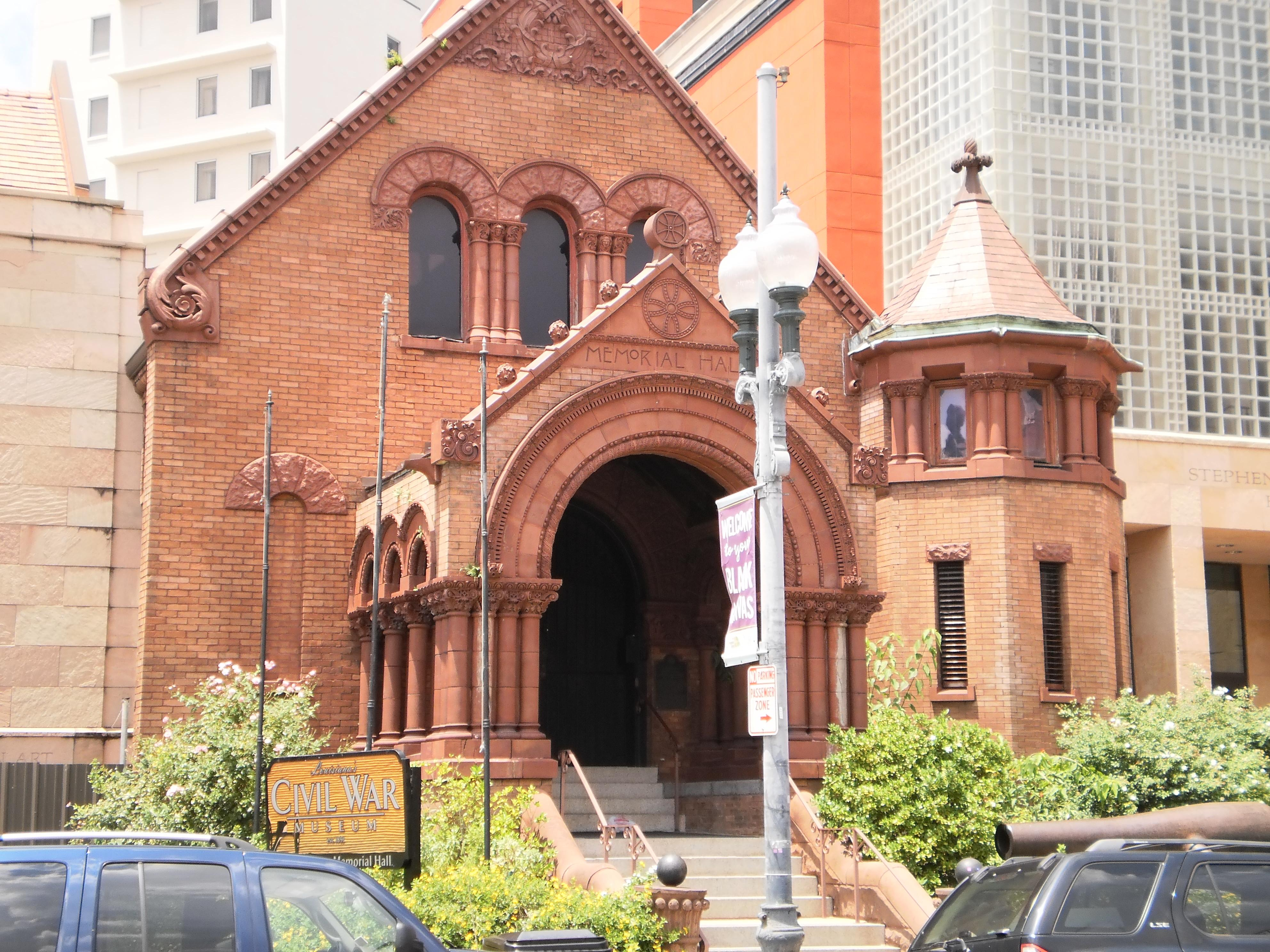
Confederate Memorial Hall in New Orleans

- Baton Rouge: Edmund Kirby Smith Hall at Building Louisiana State University (1965/ 2011). In 2017 "slated for demolition".
- Thibodaux: P.G.T. Beauregard Hall at Nicholls State University (1961/ 2010). The school is named for Confederate General and later Governor Francis T. Nicholls.
- New Orleans:
  - Gibson Hall at Tulane University (1894), named for Randall L. Gibson
  - Confederate Memorial Hall Museum (1891), the oldest museum in Louisiana
  - Adolph Meyer School (1917), New Orleans, named for Confederate general Adolph Meyer who served nine terms in the U.S. House of Representatives and advocated for the construction of the Algiers Naval Station across the street from where the school was later built. The school was renamed in the 1990s for Harriet Tubman.

=== Monuments ===
==== Courthouse monuments ====
- Alexandria: Rapides Parish Confederate Monument (1914)
- Benton: Confederate Soldier Monument (1910)
- East Feliciana Parish – Confederate Soldiers Monument in Front of the East Feliciana Courthouse Clinton Louisiana
- Franklin: Confederate Monument (1913)
- Lake Charles: South's Defenders Monument (1915); knocked from its pedestal by Hurricane Laura
- Opelousas: Confederate Monument (1920)
- Port Allen: Henry Watkins Allen Statue (1962)
- Shreveport: Confederate Monument, on grounds of the Caddo Parish courthouse, dedicated in 1906 by UDC, NRHP-listed. Moved to private land in rural De Soto County in 2022.
- St. Francisville: Confederate Monument (1903). Has Confederate flag above the inscription: "In memory of West Feliciana's Confederate dead, wherever at rest. Co. C 1st Regt. La. Cavalry".
- Tallulah: Confederate Monument (1912)
- Winnfield: Confederate Monument (1926)

==== Other public monuments ====
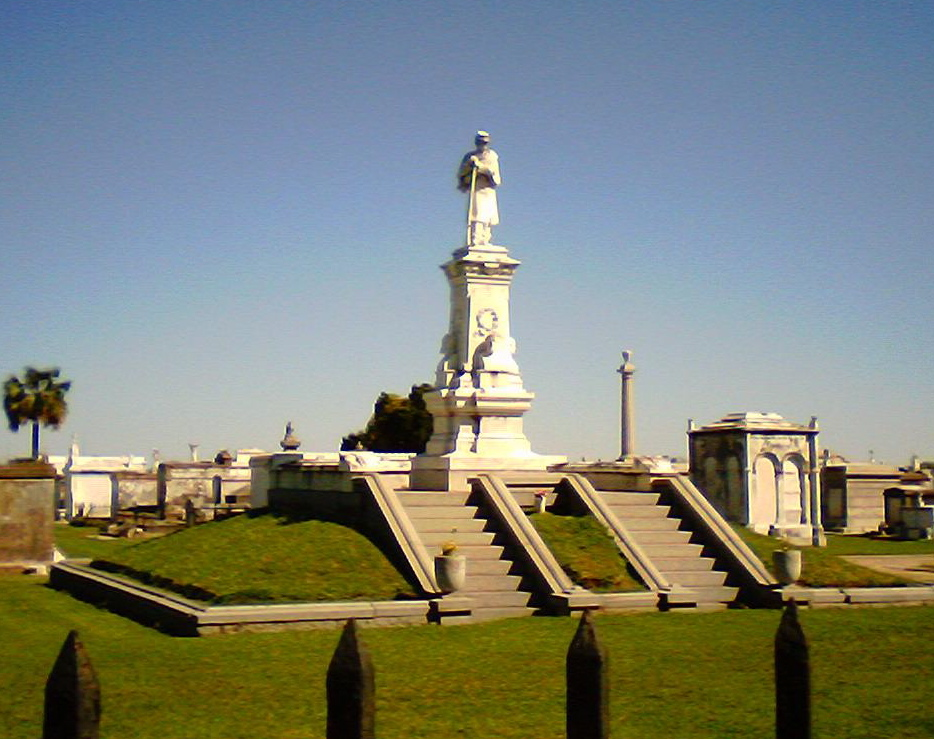
Greenwood Cemetery, New Orleans

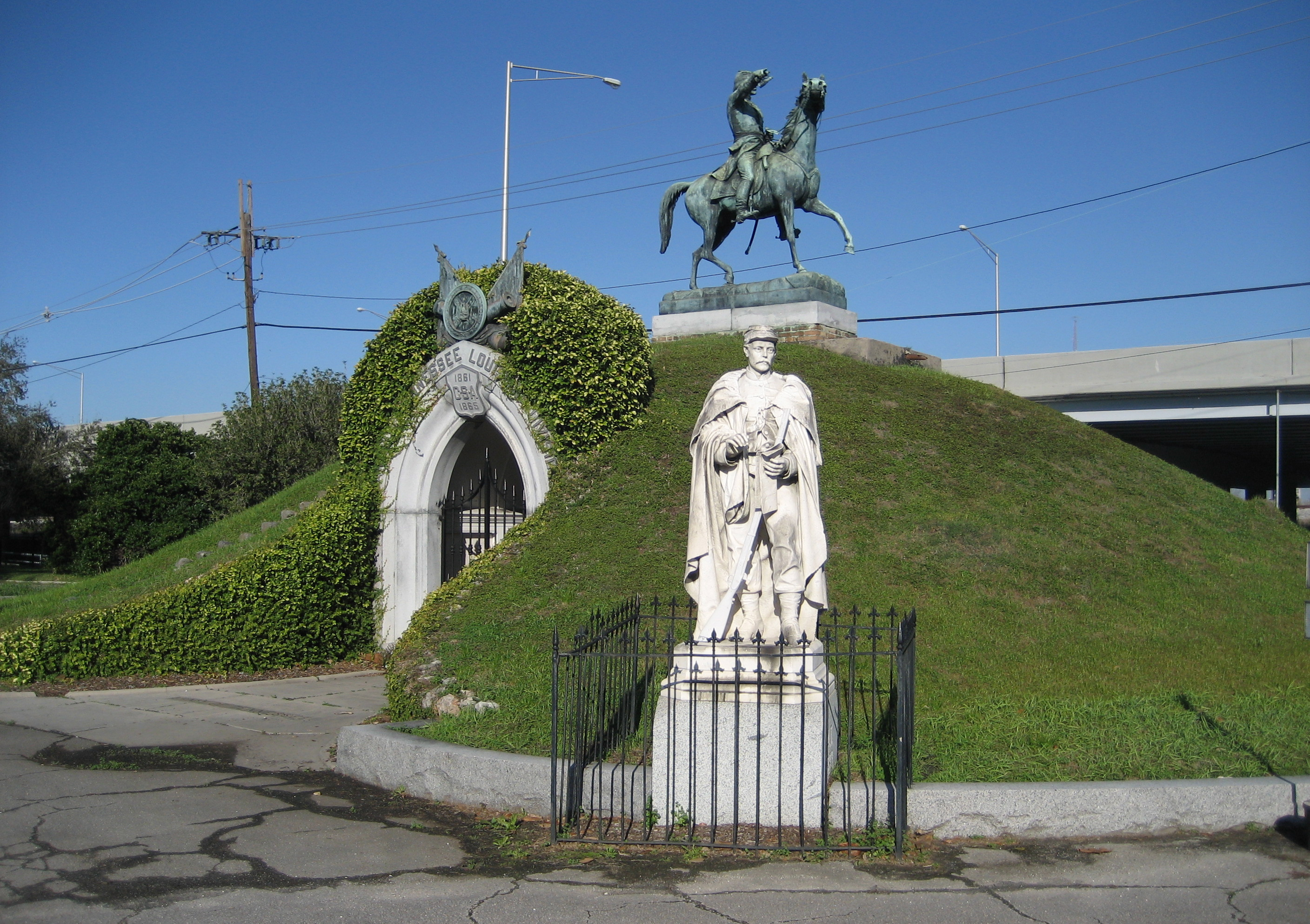
Army of Tennessee Tomb, Metairie Cemetery, New Orleans

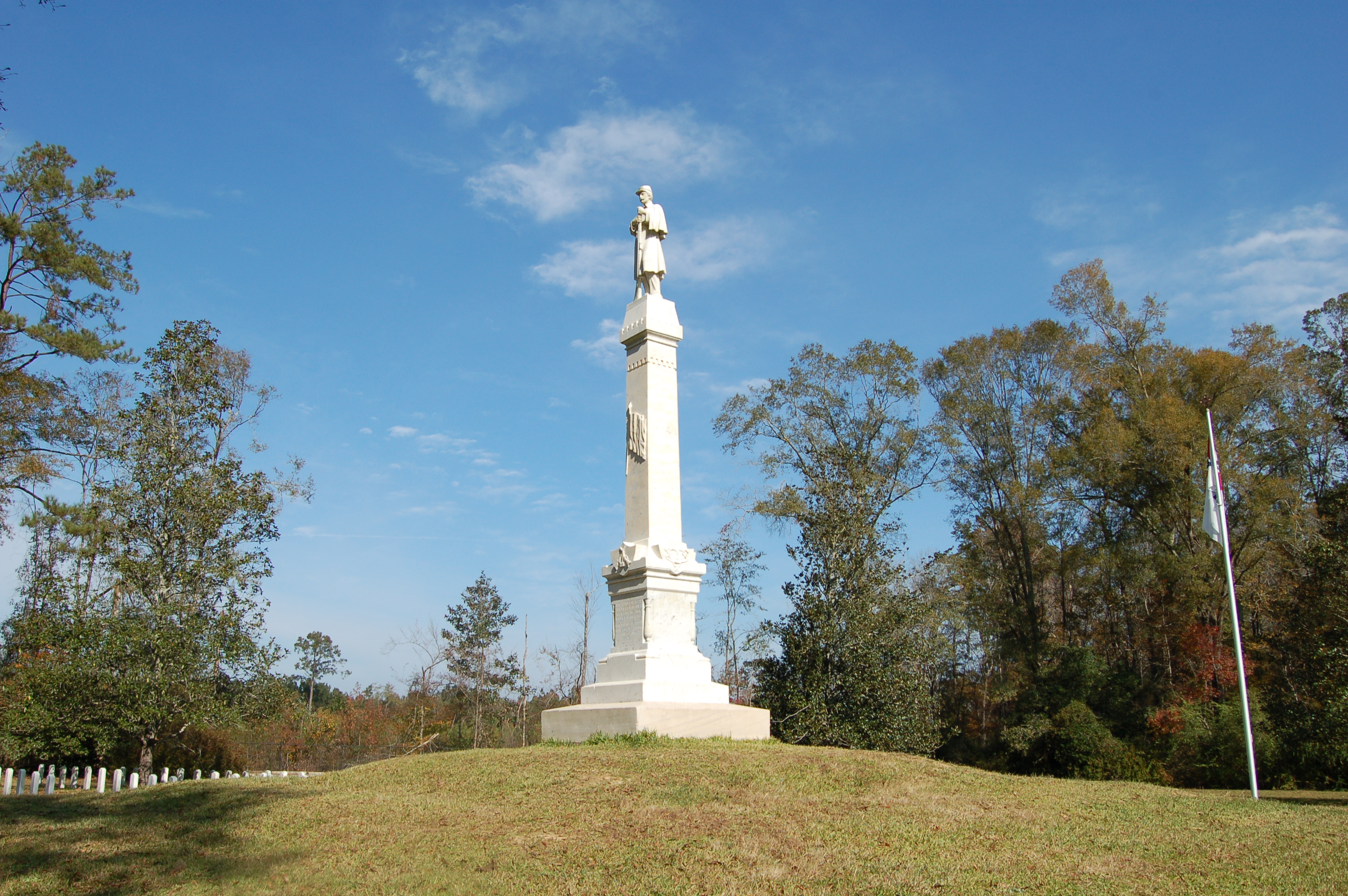
Monument at Camp Moore, Tangipahoa Parish

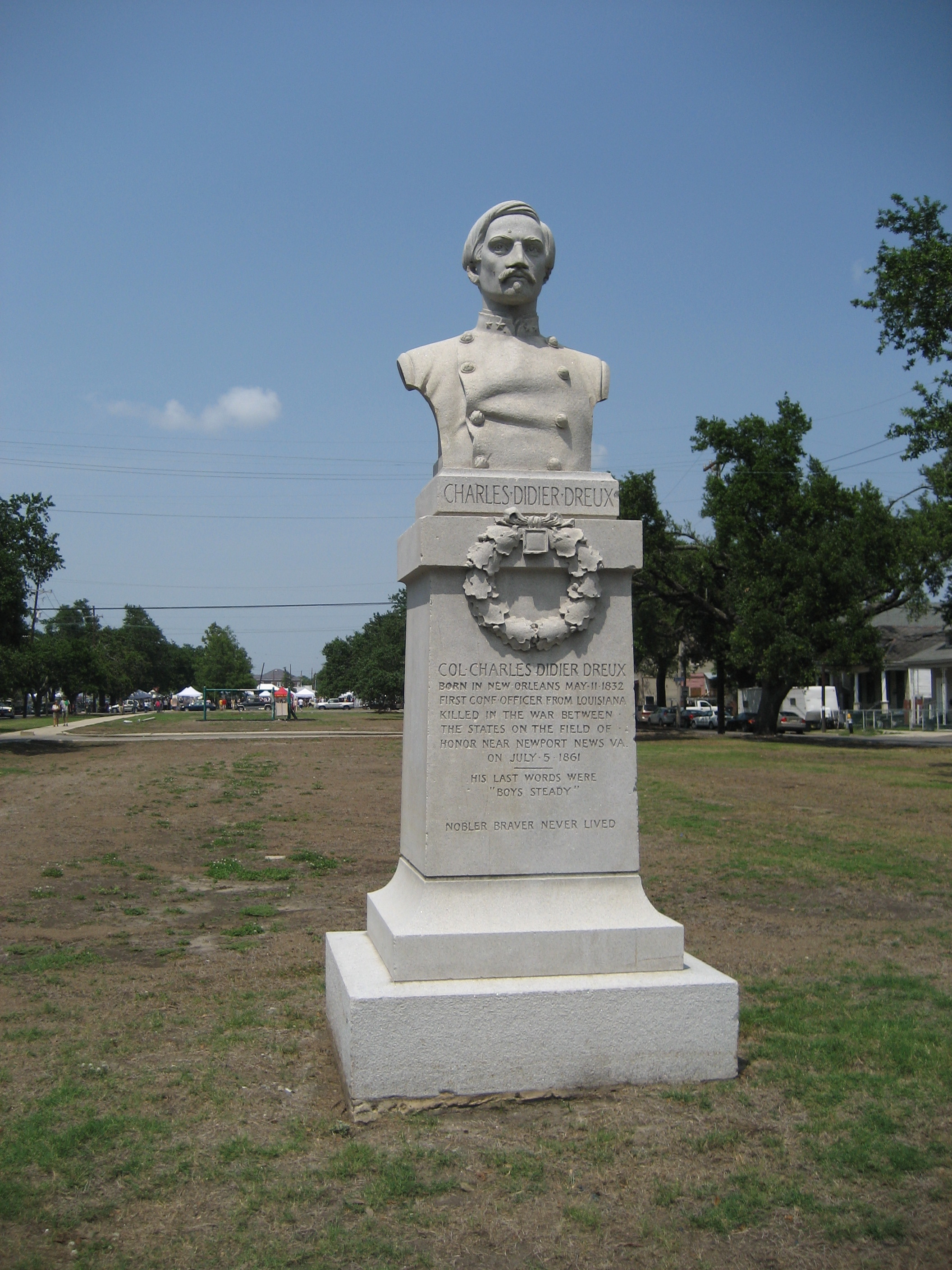
Charles Didier Dreux statue in New Orleans

- Baton Rouge:
  - Breckinridge's March Monument (1931)
  - Confederate Monument (1886)
  - Jefferson Davis Highway Monument
- Belle Chasse: Judah P. Benjamin Monument (1968)
- Clinton: Confederate Monument (1909)
- DeSoto Parish: monuments commemorating the Battle of Pleasant Hill include:
  - Lieutenant Gen. Richard Taylor memorial (1994) outside Pleasant Hill American Legion Hall
  - Red River Campaign memorial (1994)
  - UDC Confederate memorial
- Donaldsonville: Fort Butler Memorial (1999)
- Gretna: Jefferson Davis Highway Marker
- Homer: Confederate Monument (1940)
- Johnson Bayou: Robert E. L Statue (1984)
- Lafayette: Brig. Gen. J.J. Alfred A. Mouton Statue (1922). There was considerable local discussion about what to do with the monument. Removed on July 18, 2021.
- Marthaville: Unknown Confederate Soldier Monument (1970)
- Minden: Confederate Monument (1933)
- New Orleans:
  - Confederate Monument (1874), Greenwood Cemetery
  - Army of Tennessee Tomb (1886) at Metairie Cemetery, consisting of a Gothic chapel tomb containing 48 vaults, surmounted by an equestrian statue of Albert Sidney Johnston. A marble statue near the tomb's entrance shows a Confederate sergeant calling the roll. Johnston, P. G. T. Beauregard, and other Confederate soldiers are entombed there.
  - Monument to Confederate Colonel Charles Didier Dreux, first Confederate officer killed in action. At intersection of South Jefferson Davis Parkway and Canal Street, across from former location of Jefferson Davis Monument.
  - Monument to Catholic priest Abram J. Ryan, called poet-priest of the Confederacy. At South Jefferson Davis Parkway and Banks Street. Erected in 1949 by the United Daughters of the Confederacy.
  - Monument to General Albert Pike, at South Jefferson Davis Parkway and Tulane Avenue. Erected 1957. Defaced with "Black Lives Matter" in 2015.
- Plaquemine: Confederate Memorial (1914)
- Shreveport: Fort Humbug Confederate Memorial (1927)
- Tangipahoa Parish: Confederate monument (1907) at Camp Moore, a museum and former Confederate training camp
- Zachary: Port Hudson Confederate Monument (1930)

=== Inhabited places ===
- Allen Parish. Named after Henry Watkins Allen, Confederate General and Governor of Louisiana during the Confederacy.
- Allendale, a neighborhood in Shreveport, where Henry Watkins Allen lived.
- Beauregard Parish (1913)
- Jefferson Davis Parish (1912)
- Village of Longstreet (unincorporated)
- City of Stonewall (named 1862, incorporated 1972)
- City of Slidell, named for John Slidell, Confederate ambassador to France.

=== Parks ===
- Marthaville: Rebel State Historic Site (1962)

=== Roads ===
- Baton Rouge:
  - Confederate Avenue
  - Jeff Davis Street
  - Lee Drive
- Bell City: Jeff Davis Road
- Bogalusa: Jefferson Davis Drive
- Bossier City:
  - General Bragg Drive
  - General Ewell Drive
  - General Polk Drive
  - General Sterling Price Drive
  - Jeb Stuart Drive
  - Kirby Smith Drive
  - Longstreet Place
  - Robert E. Lee Boulevard
  - Robert E. Lee Street
- Chalmette: Beauregard Street
- Gretna: Beauregard Drive
- Houma: Jefferson Davis Street
- Lafayette: Jeff Davis Drive
- Lake Charles:
  - Beauregard Drive
  - Beauregard Avenue
  - Beauregard Street
- Merryville: Robert E. Lee Road
- Monroe: Jefferson Davis Drive
- New Orleans:
  - Beauregard Drive
  - Dreux Avenue, named for Confederate General Charles Didier Dreux
  - Gayarre Place, named for Charles Gayarré, a financial supporter of the Confederacy. Clio, muse or goddess of history, is on a monument. (Gayarré was a historian.) The monument was paid for by George Hacker Dunbar, an artilleryman during the Civil War, married to a niece of General Beauregard. The original statue was replaced in 1938, after vandals damaged it.
  - Governor Nicholls Street
  - Jefferson Davis Parkway. Originally named Hagan Avenue; name changed in 1911 to coincide with the unveiling of the Jefferson Davis Monument. -now Norman C. Francis Parkway.
  - Lee Circle
  - Polk Street
  - Robert E. Lee Boulevard
  - Slidell Street
- Pineville:
  - Jefferson Davis Drive
  - Longstreet Drive
- Rayne: Jeff Davis Avenue

=== Schools ===
- De Ridder:
  - Beauregard Alternative School
  - East Beauregard Elementary School (2001)
  - De Ridder: East Beauregard High School (1962)
- Monroe: Robert E. Lee Junior High School – now Neville Junior High School.
- Longville:
  - South Beauregard Elementary School
  - South Beauregard High School
- Louisiana State University is home of the LSU Tigers (1896) and Lady Tigers teams also known as the Fighting Tigers named for the Louisiana Tigers, several Confederate Civil War regiments.
- Saint Bernard: P.G.T. Beauregard Middle School (closed)
- Thibodaux: Nicholls State University (1948), named for CSA Brig. Gen. Francis Redding Tillou Nicholls. The school's mascot, Colonel Tillou, is also named for Nicholls.

=== Confederate flag display ===
- Baton Rouge: The Stars and Bars Confederate flag and the Bonnie Blue Flag are flown behind City Hall, along with the Flag of Louisiana.

== Maryland ==
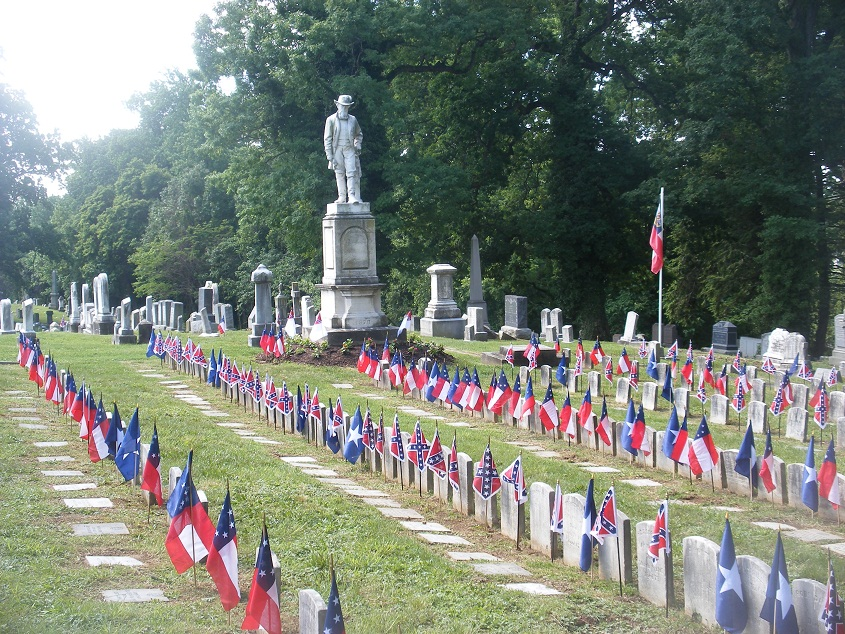
The Confederate Soldier, Loudon Park National Cemetery, Baltimore

There are at least 7 confederate monuments on public land. They are generally in or near cemeteries.

As of December 27, 2022 there is one statue on a large stone of General Robert E. Lee at the Antietam battlefield, visible from the road. It was on private land adjacent to the park, and was donated with the land.

The "Talbot Boys" statue in Easton, Maryland was the last Confederate monument removed from public property on March 14, 2022.

=== State symbols ===
Flag of Maryland since 1904

- Flag of Maryland (1904). The state flag of Maryland features the red-and-white Crossland Banner, the unofficial state flag of Maryland used by secessionists and Confederates during the American Civil War. The current state flag started appearing after the Civil War as a form of reconciliation. The flag became official in 1904.
- The former state song "Maryland, My Maryland" calls on the state to join the Confederacy. Prior to 2021, the Maryland General Assembly voted nine times to repeal, replace, or alter the state song, all without any success. In 2017, the Mighty Sound of Maryland, the marching band of the University of Maryland at College Park, stopped playing the song. In March 2021, both houses of the Maryland General Assembly voted by substantial margins to abandon "Maryland, My Maryland" as the state song. On May 18, 2021, governor Larry Hogan signed the bill officially repealing the state song. Since then, Maryland has had no official state song.

=== Monuments ===
==== Public monuments ====
- Baltimore: Confederate monuments at Loudon Park National Cemetery include:
  - The Confederate Soldier (1874)
  - Fort McHenry Monument (1912), dedicated to Confederate soldiers who died at Fort McHenry, when it was a prisoners-of-war camp.
- Scotland (St. Mary's County): Confederate Soldiers and Sailors Monument (1876), and Point Lookout Confederate Cemetery Monument (1910), located at Point Lookout Confederate Cemetery. As of October 2018, it is one of 7 cemeteries with Confederate monuments that the Veterans Administration has under 24-hour guard.
- Washington County:
  - Robert E. Lee Statue at Antietam Creek, Antietam National Battlefield (2003) The statue is attempting to be removed by legislation through H.R.970 (2019) and the National Park Service acknowledges the inaccuracies of the statue and educates those in the park accordingly.
  - Samuel Garland, Jr. Monument (1993)

==== Private monuments ====
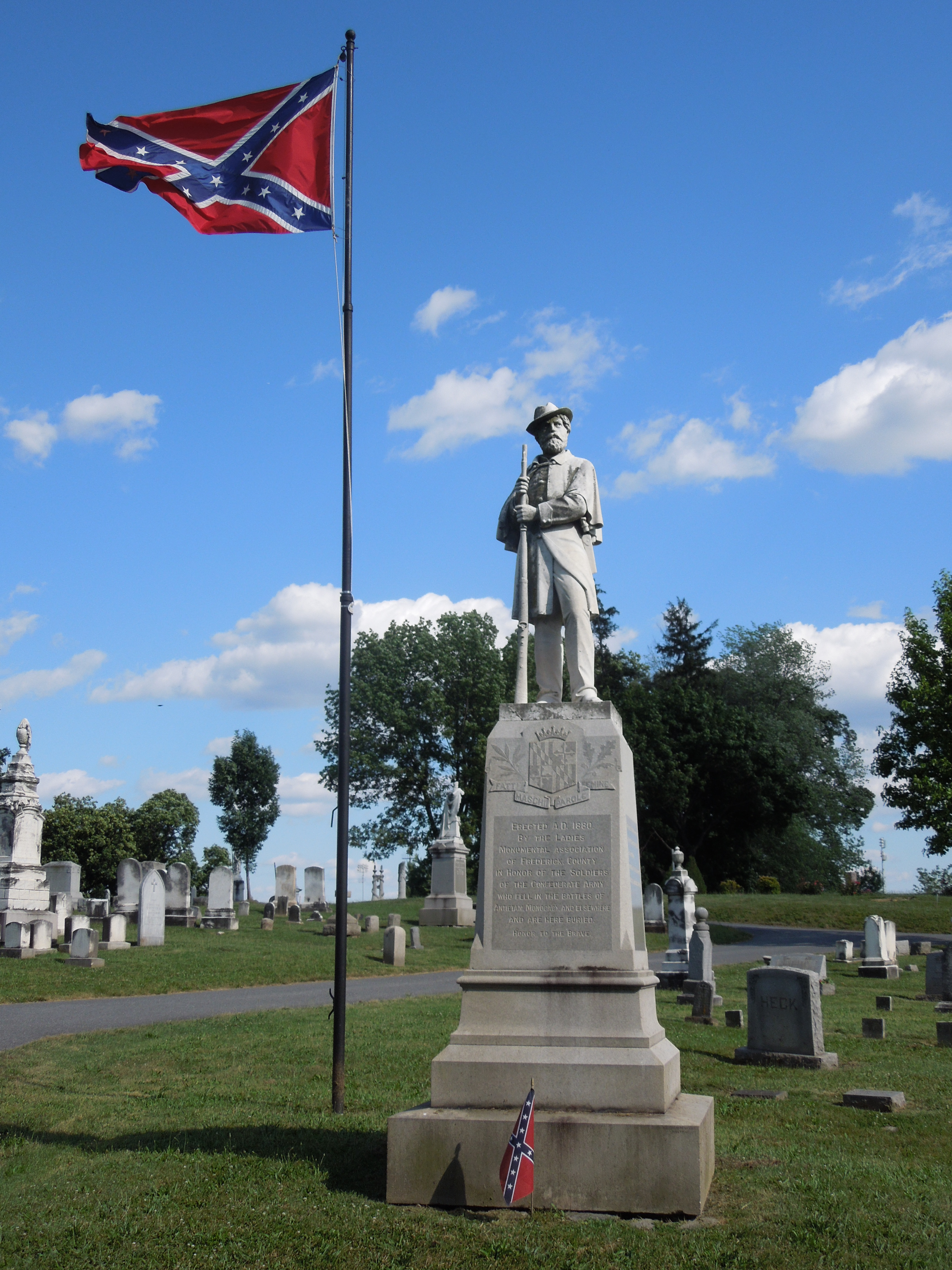
Monument to the Unknown Confederate Soldiers, Frederick, Maryland

- Beallsville: Memorial to Confederate soldiers at Monocacy Cemetery (1911; replaced 1975).
- Frederick: Monument to the Unknown Confederate Soldiers (1881), Mount Olivet Cemetery
- Fox's Gap, Frederick County, Maryland: North Carolina Monument (2003): The monument is a life sized bronze figure of a wounded Confederate color bearer on a base of black granite. It was created by sculptor Gary Casteel for the Living History association of Mecklinburg, North Carolina, and unveiled on October 18, 2003. It is dedicated to all the North Carolina troops who fought in the Battle of South Mountain. Fox's Gap is the southernmost battlefield of the Battle of South Mountain. The property is owned by the Central Maryland Heritage League, a battlefield protection group.

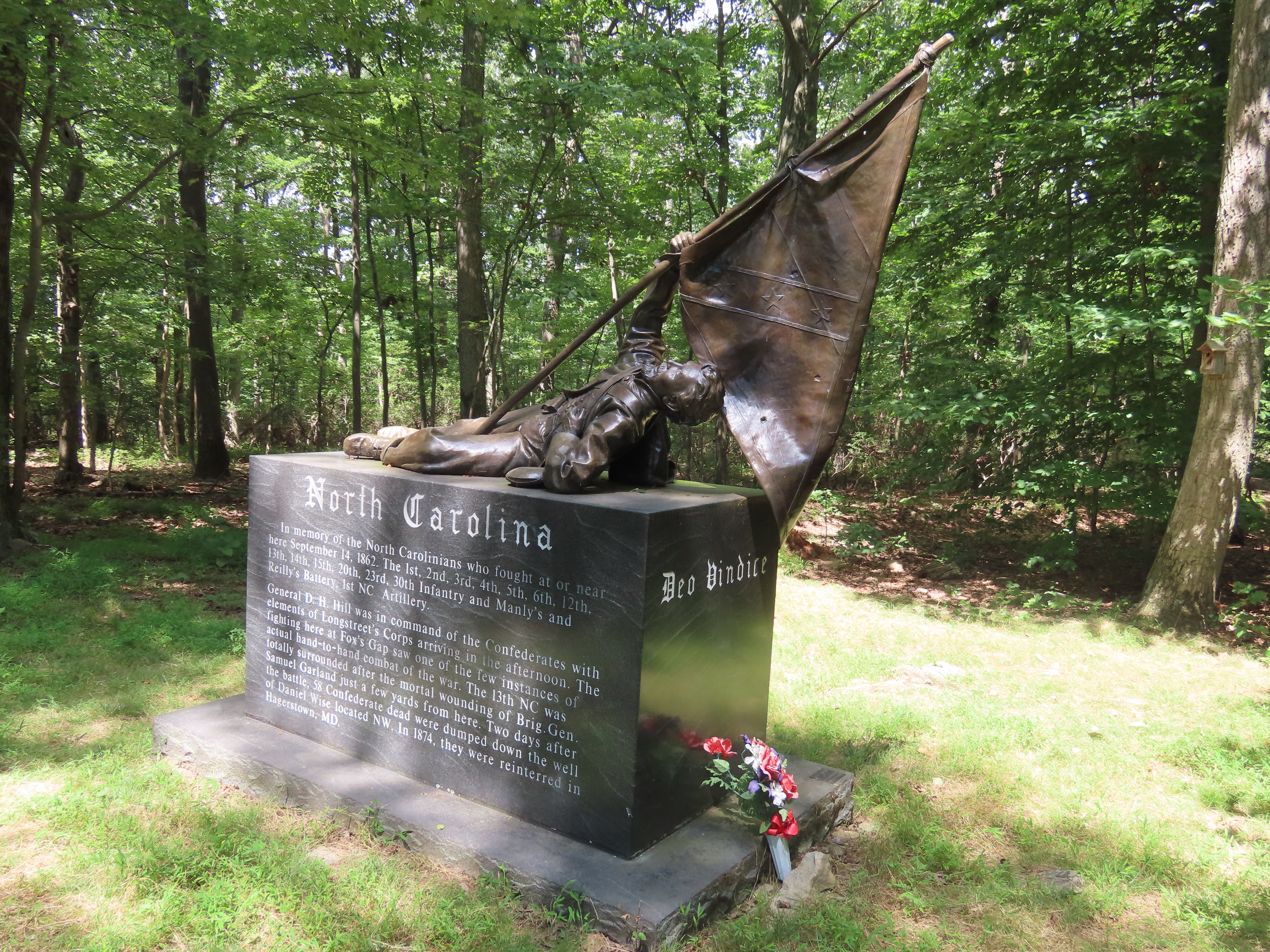
North Carolina Memorial at Fox's Gap (2003)

- White's Ferry, Montgomery County: Confederate Monument, a granite pedestal.
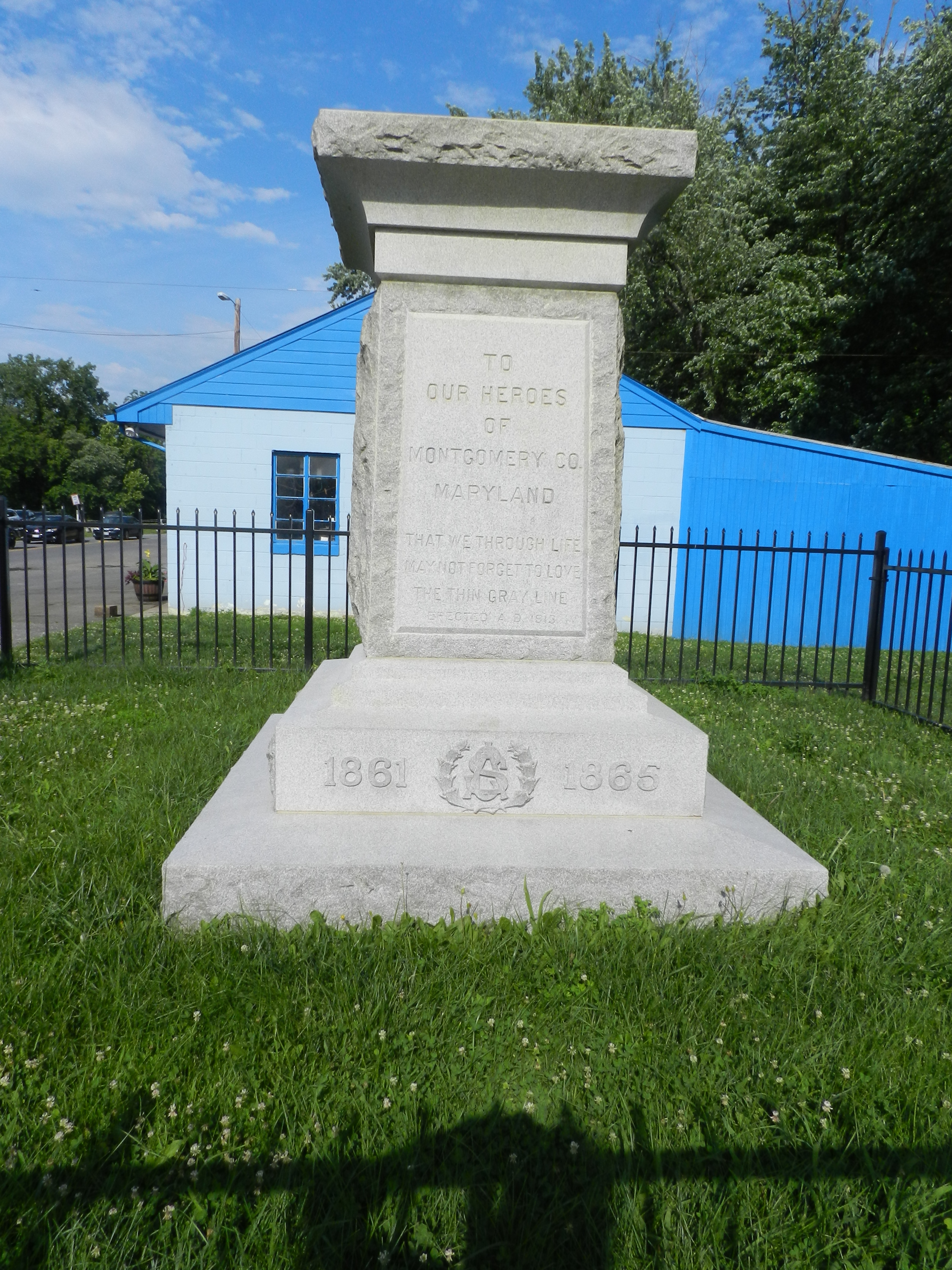
  The base of the CSA monument moved from Rockville, MD, to White's Ferry, MD.

The original monument, a bronze life-sized Confederate soldier on this pedestal, was originally donated by the UDC and the United Confederate Veterans, and built by the Washington firm of Falvey Granite Company at a cost of US$3,600 (equivalent to $117,273 in 2025). The artist is unknown. The inscription says "To Our Heroes of Montgomery Co. Maryland That We Through Life May Not Forget to Love The Thin Gray Line / Erected A.D. 1913 / 1861 CSA 1865." because Confederate uniforms are gray. The Rockville dedication was on June 3, 1913, Jefferson Davis's birthday, and was attended by 3,000 out of a county population of 30,000. It was originally located in a small triangular park called Courthouse Square. In 1971, urban renewal led to the elimination of the Square, and the monument was moved to the east lawn of the Red Brick Courthouse (no longer in use as such), facing south. In 1994 it was cleaned and waxed by the Maryland Military Monuments Commission. The monument was defaced with "Black Lives Matter" in 2015; a wooden box was built over it to protect it. The monument was removed in July 2017 from its original location outside the Old Rockville Court House to private land at White's Ferry in Dickerson, Maryland. The statue was removed from the pedestal in June 2020, but the pedestal urging people to "Love The Thin Gray Line" remains.

=== Inhabited places ===
- Confederate Hills: A residential community near Antietam National Battlefield where the streets are all named after Confederate generals, including: Longstreet Circle, General Anderson Court, General Branch Court, General Gordon Circle, General Hill Circle, General Lee Drive, General Stonewall Jackson Circle, and General Stuart Court.

=== Roads ===
- Potomac:
  - Jubal Early Court
  - J. E. B. Stuart Road

=== Ferry ===
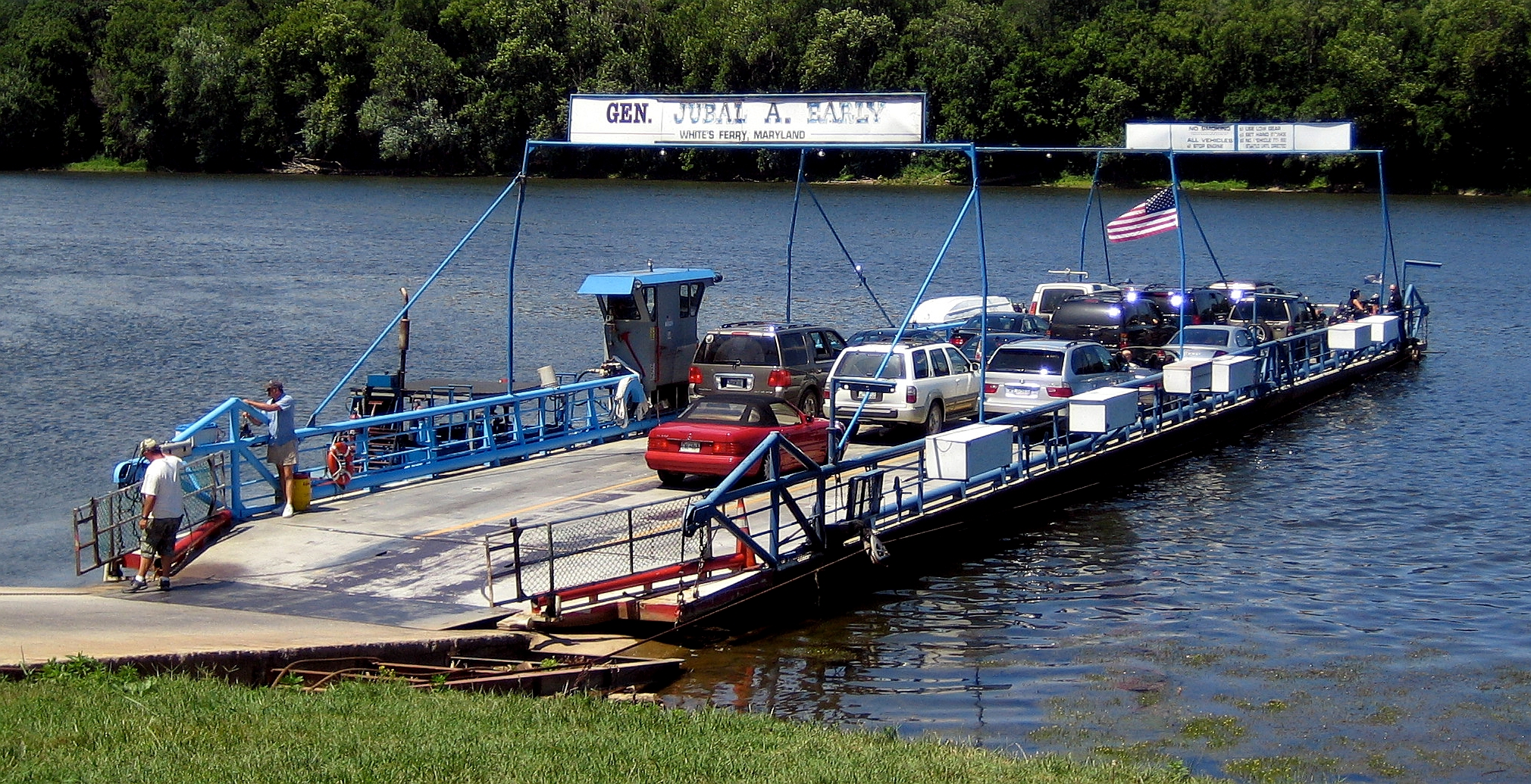
Gen. Jubal A. Early

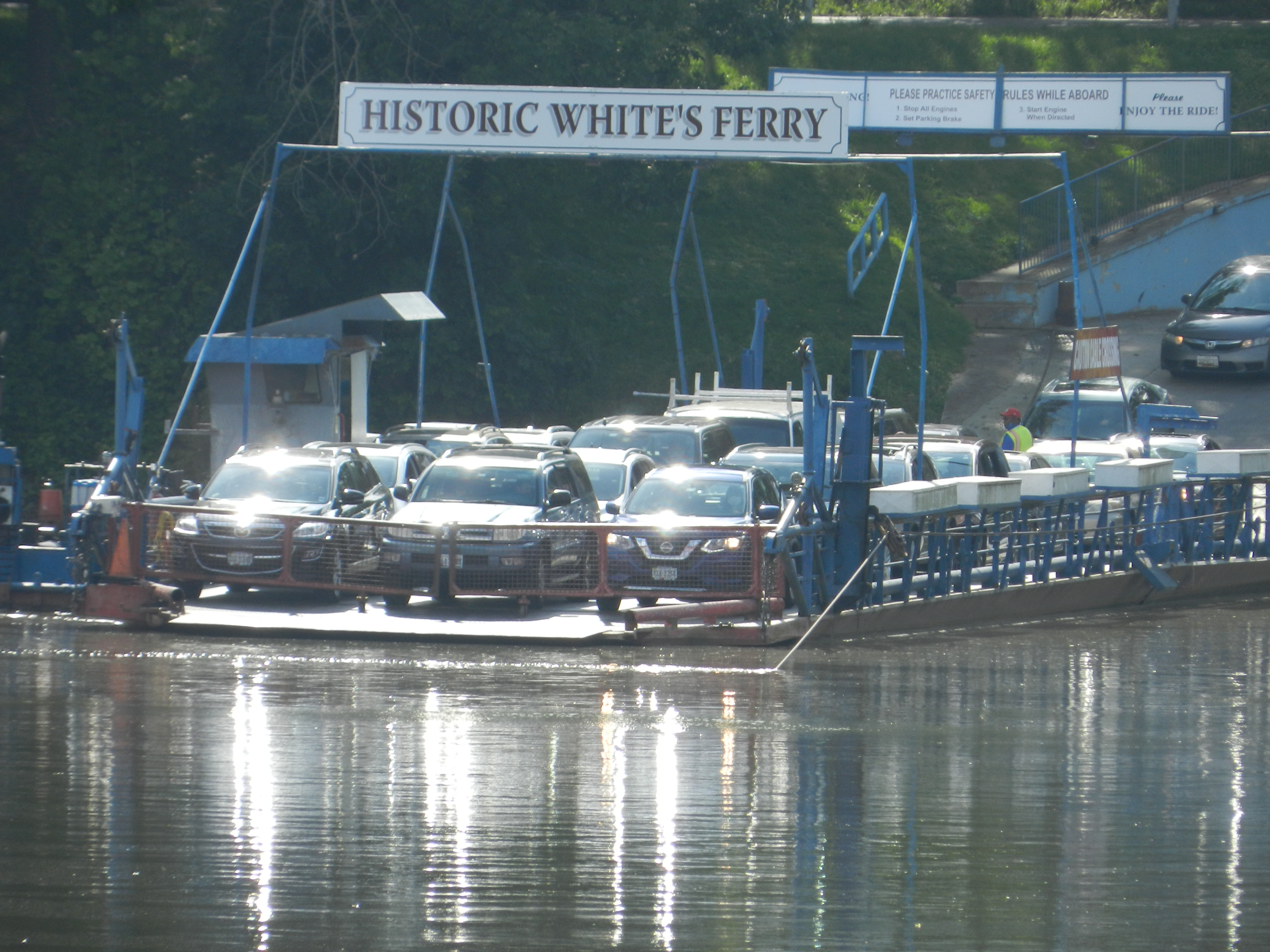
The renamed White's Ferry ferryboat

- Montgomery County: A passenger and vehicle ferry, formerly named Gen. Jubal A. Early (1954), connected Montgomery County, Maryland, and Loudoun County, Virginia. Owned by White's Ferry, it was named for Confederate General Jubal Early until June 2020 when it was renamed Historic White's Ferry. White's Ferry was the only ferry still in operation on the Potomac River until it ceased operations in Dec 2020.

=== Gallery ===
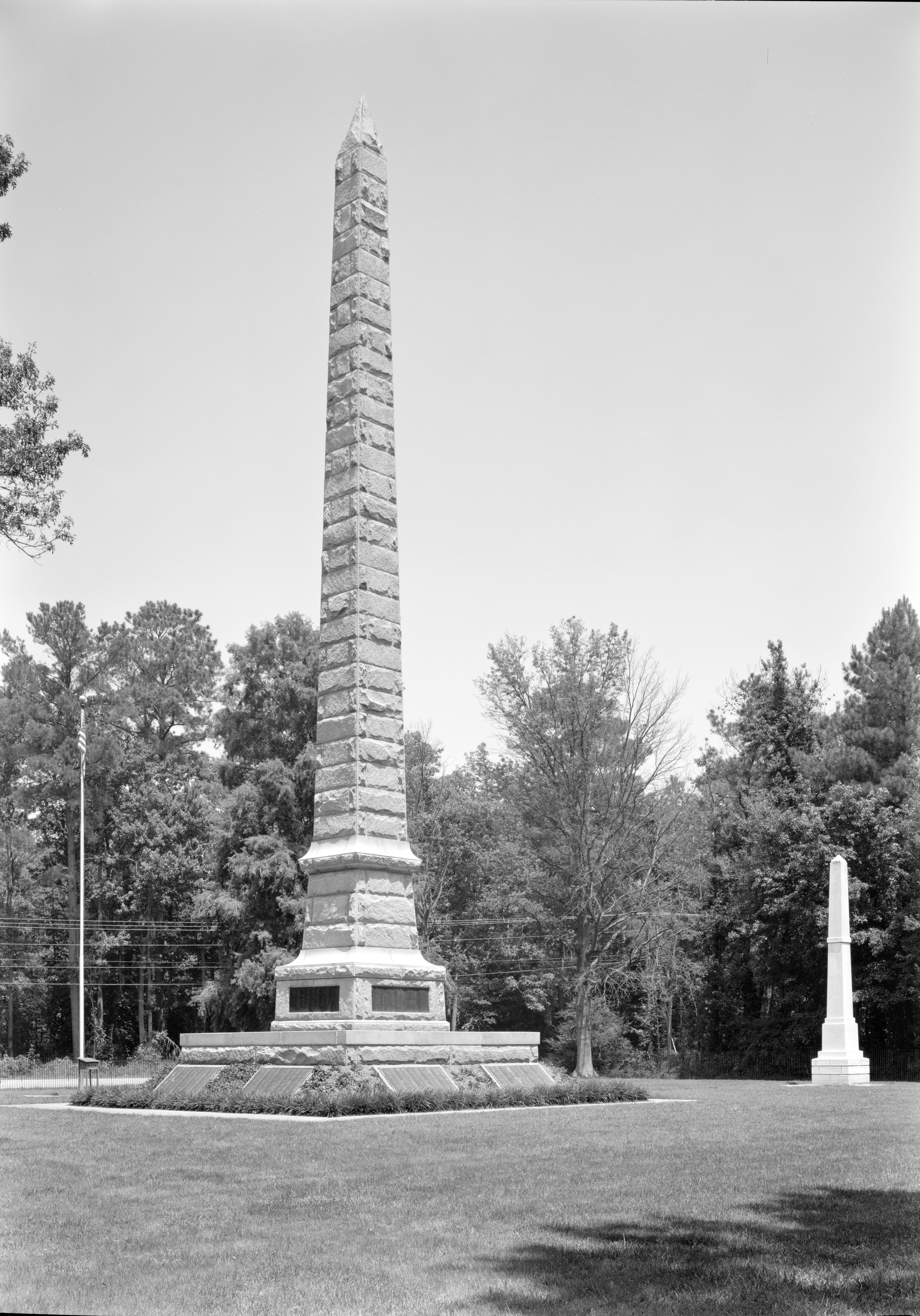
Point Lookout Confederate Cemetery Monument (center) and Confederate Soldiers and Sailors Monument

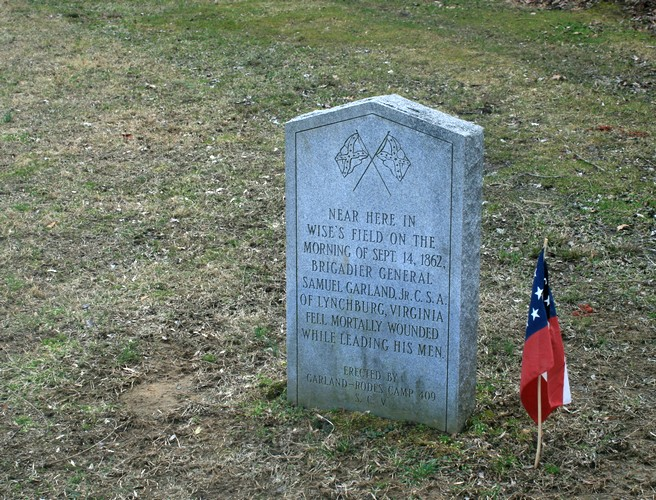
Samuel Garland, Jr. Monument

Confederate Memorial in Silver Spring to 17 unknown soldiers buried at Grace Episcopal Church Cemetery after the Battle of Fort Stevens

== Massachusetts ==
As of May 2019, all public memorials had been removed.

=== Private memorials ===
- Cambridge
  - Memorial Hall, Harvard University. Stained-glass windows to commemorate various figures, among them:
    - Honor and Peace Window (1900). There is no inscription, but a Harvard University page (Memorial Hall) explaining the windows says: "This window commemorates those who surrendered their lives in the War of the Rebellion." Portrays two warriors, one with sword high in triumph, one kneeling in defeat, who from the ribbons can be seen to be from different but related countries.
    - Student and Soldier Window (1889). Soldier wears gray uniform.

== Michigan ==
As of June 29, 2020, there is at least one known public monument of a confederate soldier in Michigan. It is located in Allendale, Michigan, a town in Ottawa County. A part of the Veterans Garden of Honor (1998) which features nine life sized statues of soldiers from various wars, the statue in question depicts a union soldier and a confederate soldier back to back with a young slave at their feet holding a plaque reading "Freedom to Slaves," and the date January 5, 1863.

== Minnesota ==
Murray County Central High School in Slayton, and United South Central High School in Wells both use a Rebel mascot and the nickname "Rebels."

== Mississippi ==
As of 24 June 2020, there are at least 147 public spaces with Confederate monuments in Mississippi.

== Missouri ==
As of 24 June 2020, there were at least 19 public spaces with Confederate monuments in Missouri.

=== Monuments ===
==== Courthouse monuments ====
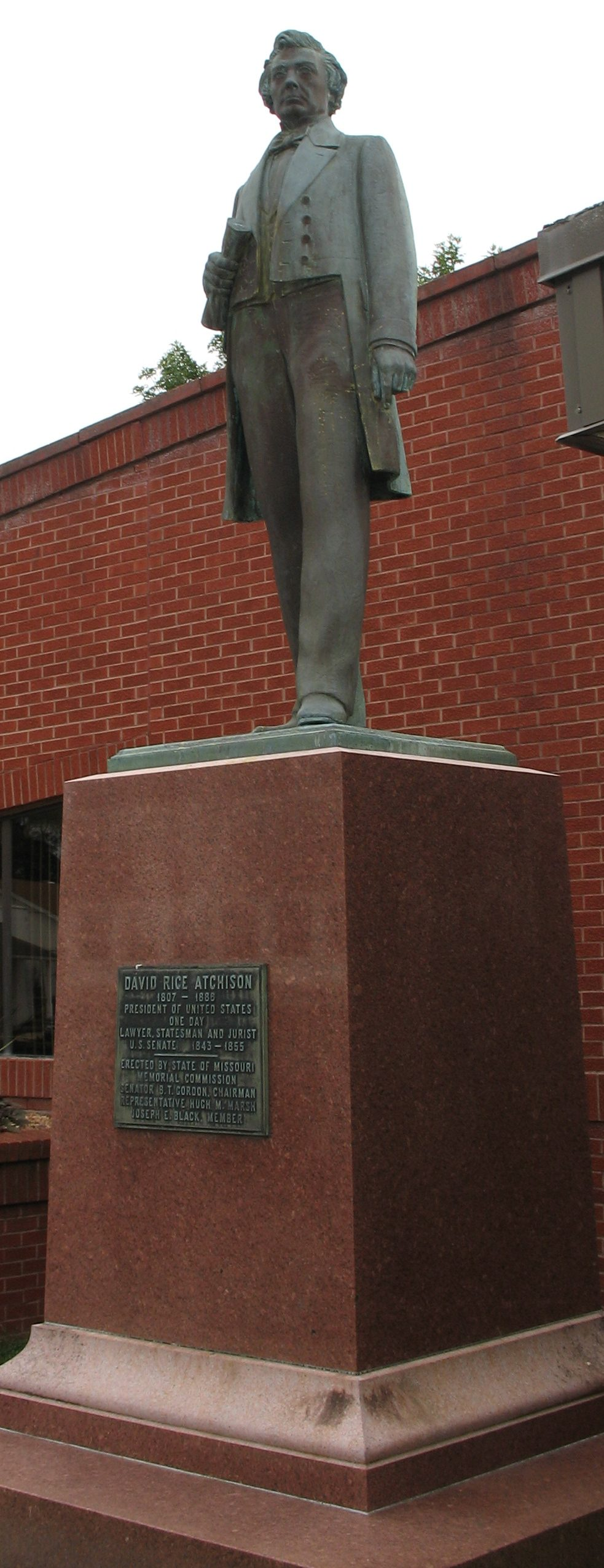
Statue of David Rice Atchison in front of the Clinton County Courthouse, Plattsburg, Missouri

- Cape Girardeau: Confederate War Memorial (1931)
- Columbia: Confederate Monument (1935). Relocated to the Centralia Battlefield in September 2015.
- Huntsville: Captain Delaney S. Washburn Memorial (1976).
- Neosho: Confederate Captain of Missouri Monument.
- Palmyra: Palmyra Massacre Monument (1907).
- Plattsburg: Statute of CSA Brig Gen David Rice Atchison who was later a US Senator

==== Other public monuments ====
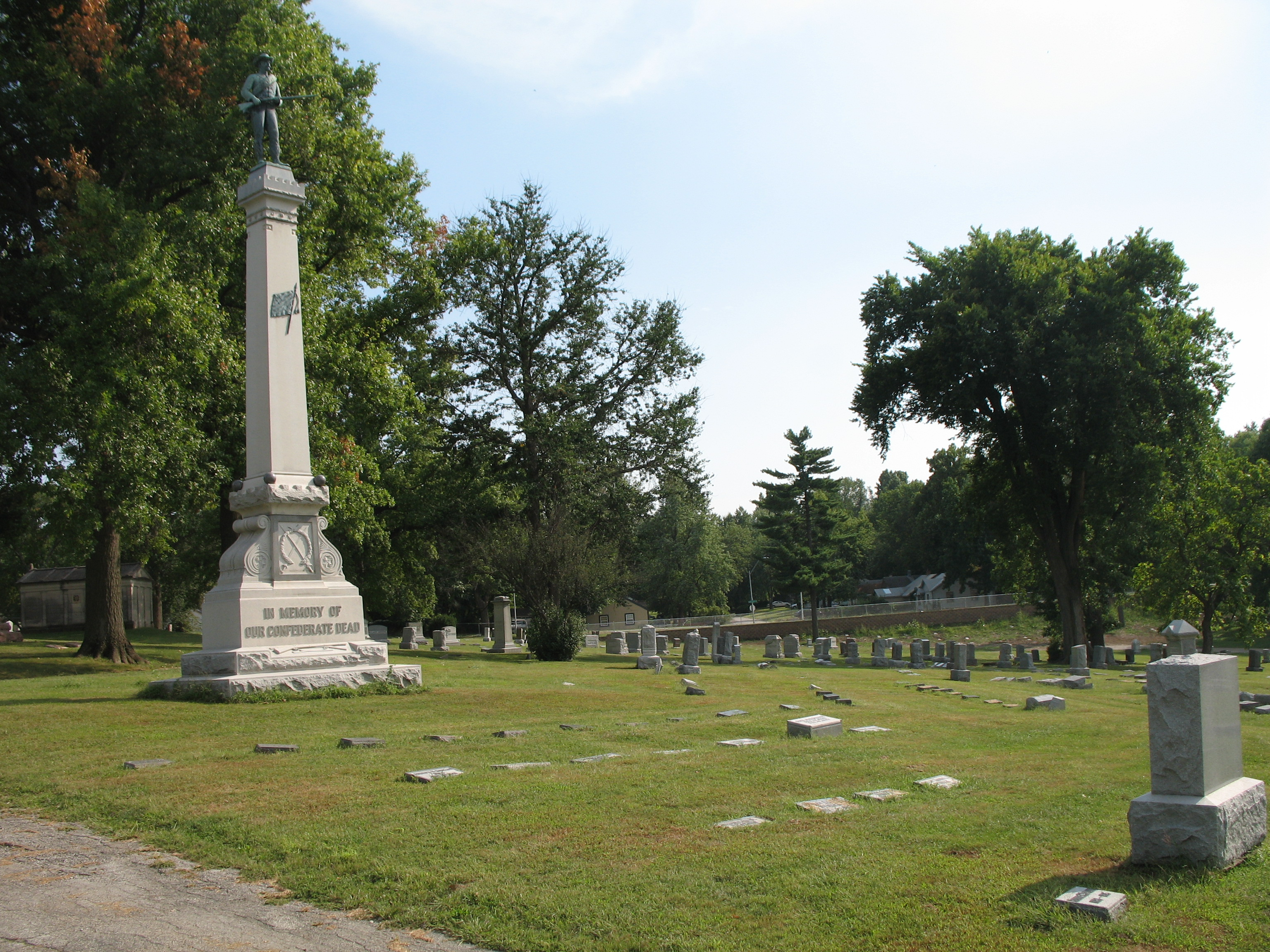
UDC monument at Forest Hill and Calvary Cemetery, Kansas City, Missouri

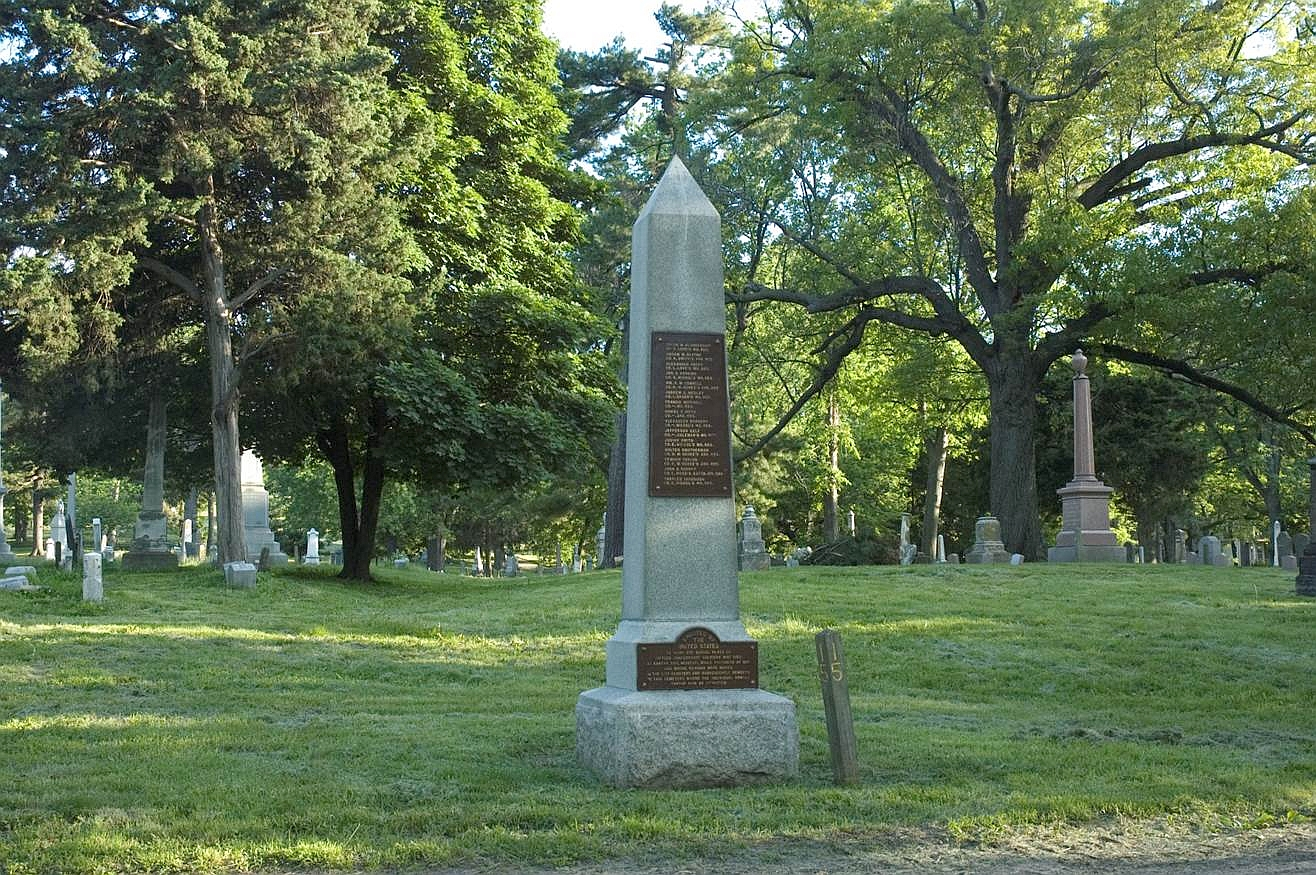
Union Confederate Monument, Union Cemetery, Kansas City, Missouri

- Brookline: Missouri State Guard Monument (2001)
- Centralia: Boone County Confederate Memorial (1935)
- Dexter: Frenchman's Spring Monument (1996). A natural gathering place for soldiers. In July 1861, 2,000 soldiers from 15 southeast Missouri counties met to organize as the First Division, Missouri State Guard – the pro-Confederate state militia, known as the Swamp Fox Brigade.
- Higginsville: Confederate Memorial State Historic Site; also called "Lion of Lucerne" (1906)
- Kansas City:
  - UDC monument at Forest Hill and Calvary Cemetery to CSA soldiers killed at the Battle of Westport. Buried nearby is CSA General Joseph O. Shelby.
  - Union Confederate Monument, Union Cemetery (1911)
  - Monument to the "Loyal Women of the Old South". The memorial to Confederate women, a 1934 gift by the United Daughters of the Confederacy, was defaced by graffiti on August 18, 2017, and boxed up two days later in preparation for its removal. The monument was removed on August 25, 2017.
- Keytesville: Sterling Price Monument, Price Park (1915)
- Lone Jack: Cemetery monument to Confederate soldiers who died in the Battle of Lone Jack
- Marshall: Confederate Monument of Saline (1901)
- Neosho: Considered the state capital by Confederates, has two memorials
  - Marker on court house lawn states that Missouri separated from the Union
  - Memorial at Oddfellows Cemetery (1904) near a mass grave
- Roanoke: Shelby's Homecoming Monument (1997)
- Springfield: Two monuments are located at Springfield National Cemetery: the Monument to Confederate Soldiers of Missouri and General Sterling Price (1901), and a UDC granite marker to the unknown Confederate dead at the Battle of Wilson's Creek (1958). In late August 2017, someone threw paint on it; as of October 2018, it is one of 7 cemeteries with Confederate monuments that the Veterans Administration has under 24-hour guard.
- St. Louis:
  - Memorial to the Confederate Dead, Jefferson Barracks National Cemetery (1988)
- Waverly: CSA Gen. Joseph O. Shelby Statue (2009).
- West Alton: Confederate Memorial, Lincoln Shields Recreation Area (1909).

=== Inhabited places ===
- Atchison County, Missouri Named for Brigadier General David Rice Atchison
- Breckenridge: Named for U.S. Vice President and Confederate general John C. Breckinridge, although the name was misspelled.

=== Parks ===
- Keytesville: Price Park memorializes Major General Sterling Price. (1915)
- Higginsville: Confederate Memorial State Historic Site

=== Roads ===
- Battlefield: South Robert E. Lee Street
- Hillsboro: Jefferson Davis Drive
- Sappington:
  - General Lee Drive
  - Confederacy Drive

=== Schools ===
- Southland C-9 School District: Rebelman mascot, school colors red, gray, and white.

== Montana ==
As of 24 June 2020, there are at least 2 public spaces with Confederate monuments in Montana.

- Beaverhead: Confederate Dam
- Beaverhead: Jeff Davis Creek
- Confederate Gulch: historic gold mining camp founded in 1864 by Confederate soldiers, including parolees.

== Nevada ==
As of June 24, 2020, there is at least one public space with Confederate monuments in Nevada.

- Jeff Davis Peak in the Snake Range mountains of White Pine County was named in 1855 after Jefferson Davis. The name was replaced after the George Floyd Protests.

== New Jersey ==
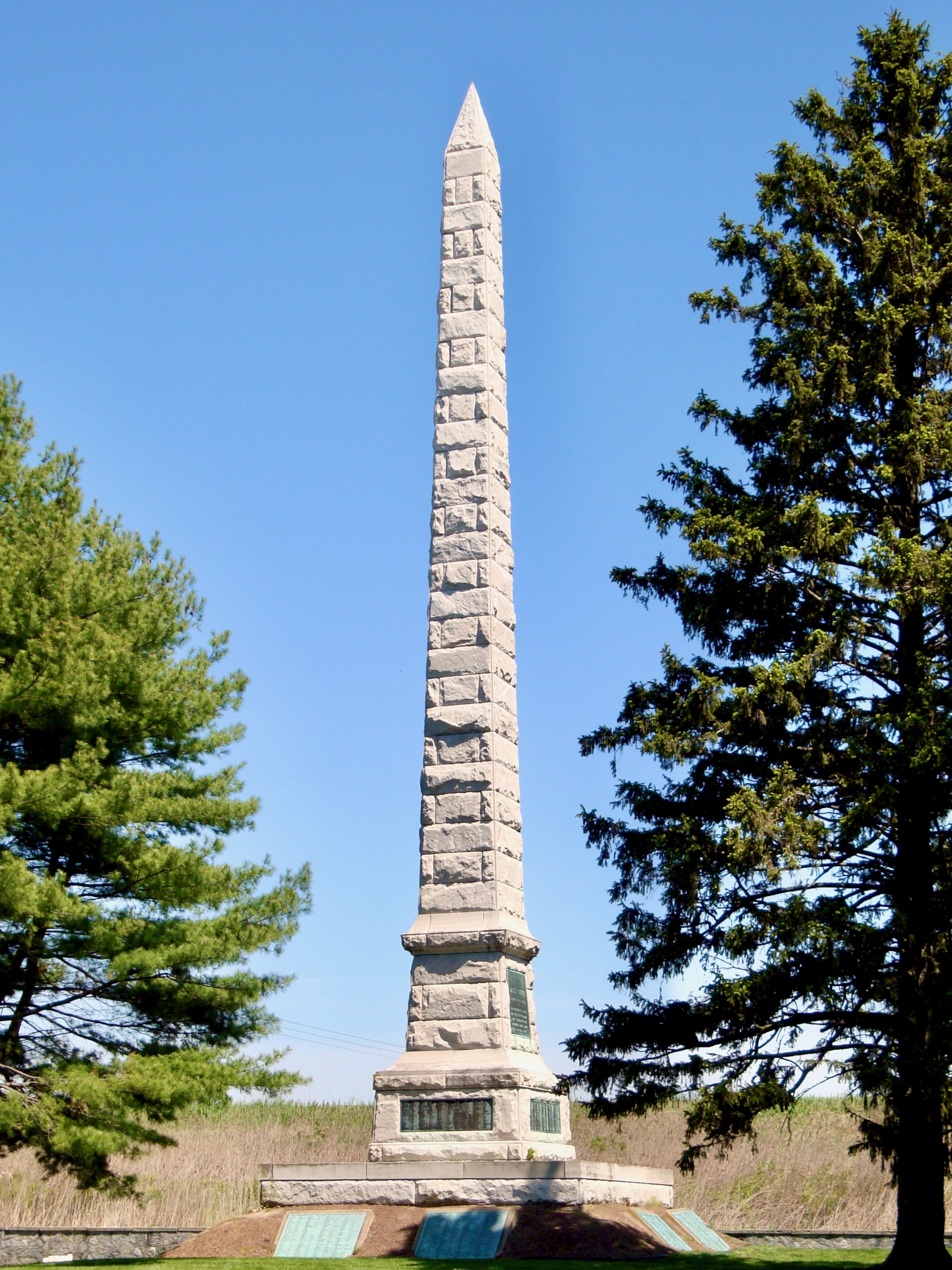
Confederate Monument (1910), Finn's Point National Cemetery.

There are at least two public spaces dedicated to the Confederacy in New Jersey.

- Pennsville Township: Confederate Monument (1910), Finn's Point National Cemetery. Commemorates the 2,436 Confederate prisoners-of-war who died at Fort Delaware. As of October 2018, it is one of 7 cemeteries with Confederate monuments that the Veterans Administration has under 24-hour guard.
- Princeton: Princeton’s Civil War Memorial (1920s), Nassau Hall at Princeton University. Commemorates 70 alumni who died in the war, including 34 who fought for the Confederacy.

== New Mexico ==
As of June 24, 2020, there is at least one public space with Confederate monuments in New Mexico.

- Santa Fe: Confederate memorial (1993), Santa Fe National Cemetery. Granite and bronze memorial dedicated to 31 Confederate soldiers discovered in shallow graves in 1987 at Glorieta Pass Battlefield, then re-interred at Santa Fe National Cemetery.
- Socorro: Confederate monument (2012) entitled Victory Awaits You

== New York ==
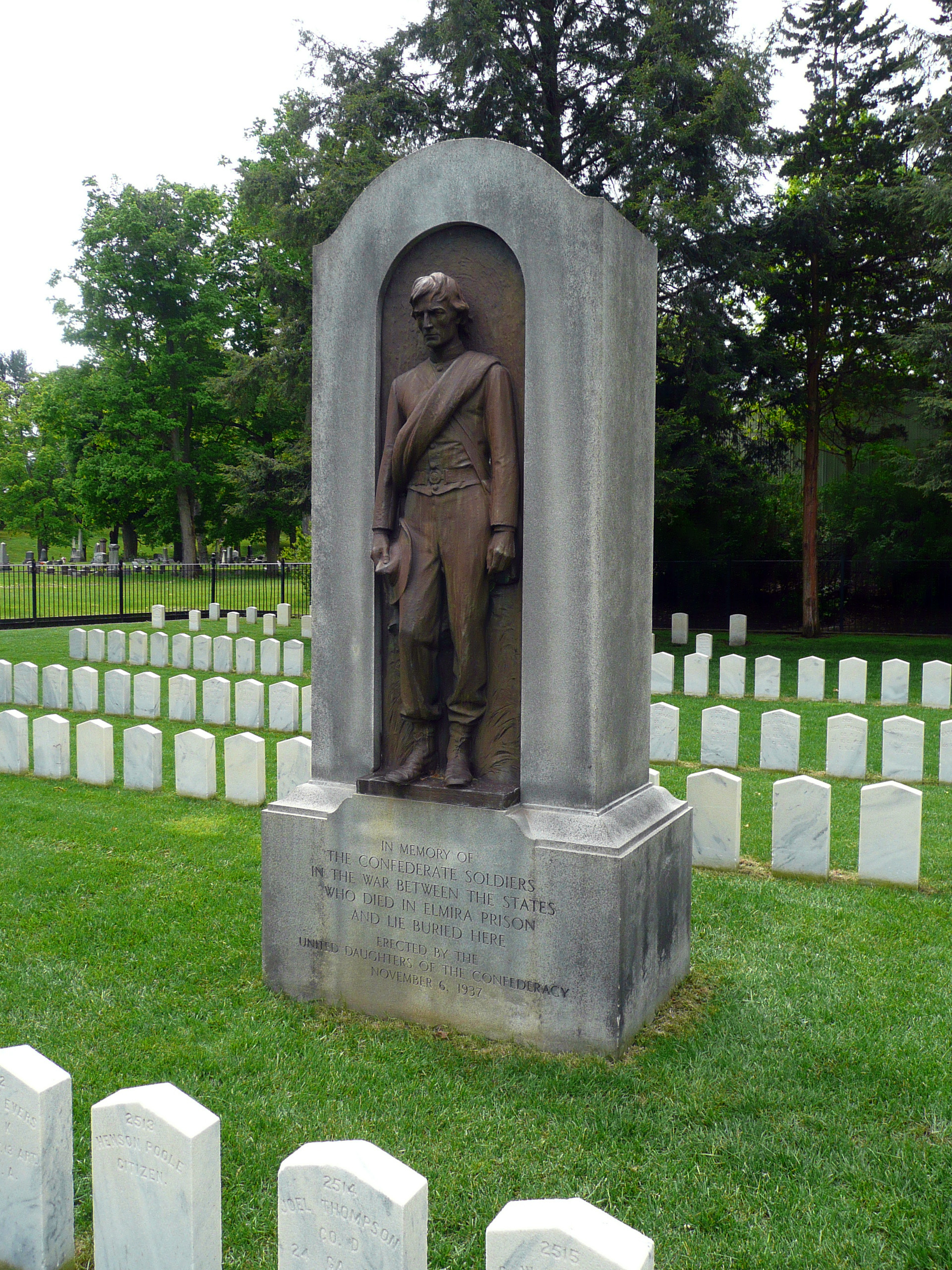
Confederate Monument, Woodlawn National Cemetery, Elmira, New York

As of 24 June 2020, there are at least 3 public spaces with Confederate monuments in New York.

=== Monuments ===
==== Public monuments ====
- The Bronx: Busts of Stonewall Jackson and Robert E. Lee were in the Hall of Fame for Great Americans at Bronx Community College. The college removed the busts in 2020.
- Central Park: J. Marion Sims. In November 2017, the cover of Harper's Magazine featured J. C. Hallman's article "Monumental Error," about the Central Park monument of controversial surgeon – and Confederate spy – J. Marion Sims. The timing coincided with the work New York City Mayor Bill De Blasio's committee on monuments, and Hallman's article was distributed to members of New York's Public Design Commission. The commission voted unanimously to remove Sims's statue, and it was removed in April 2018. Hallman has since written articles about Sims's statue in Montgomery, Alabama, and is working on a book, The Anarcha Quest, about Sims and his so-called "first cure," Anarcha Westcott.

==== Private monuments ====
- Brooklyn: A tree at St. John's Episcopal Church bears a plaque, installed by UDC in 1912, reading "This tree was planted by CSA Gen. Robert Edward Lee, while stationed at Fort Hamilton." The plaque was removed in 2017.
- Elmira: UDC monument (1937) at Woodlawn National Cemetery, dedicated to Confederate soldiers who died in Elmira Prison. As of October 2018, it is one of 7 cemeteries with Confederate monuments that the Veterans Administration has under 24-hour guard.
- Hastings-on-Hudson: Confederate marker at Mount Hope Cemetery

=== Roads ===
- Fort Hamilton, Brooklyn:
  - General Lee Avenue. The avenue was renamed to John Warren Avenue in 2022, to honor a 22-year-old lieutenant in the Army who was killed in the Vietnam War in January 1969.
  - Stonewall Jackson Drive. The road was later renamed to Washington Road in 2022, shortly after the renaming of General Lee Avenue.

Governor Andrew Cuomo had twice requested the Army, unsuccessfully, to have these streets renamed.

- Throggs Neck, The Bronx: Longstreet Avenue, named for CSA Gen. James Longstreet

== North Carolina ==
As of 24 June 2020, there are at least 164 public spaces with Confederate monuments in North Carolina.

== Ohio ==
As of 24 June 2020, there are at least 5 public spaces with Confederate monuments in Ohio.

=== Historical marker ===
- In 2013, the state of Ohio erected 32 historical markers marking the John Hunt Morgan Heritage Trail.

=== Monuments ===
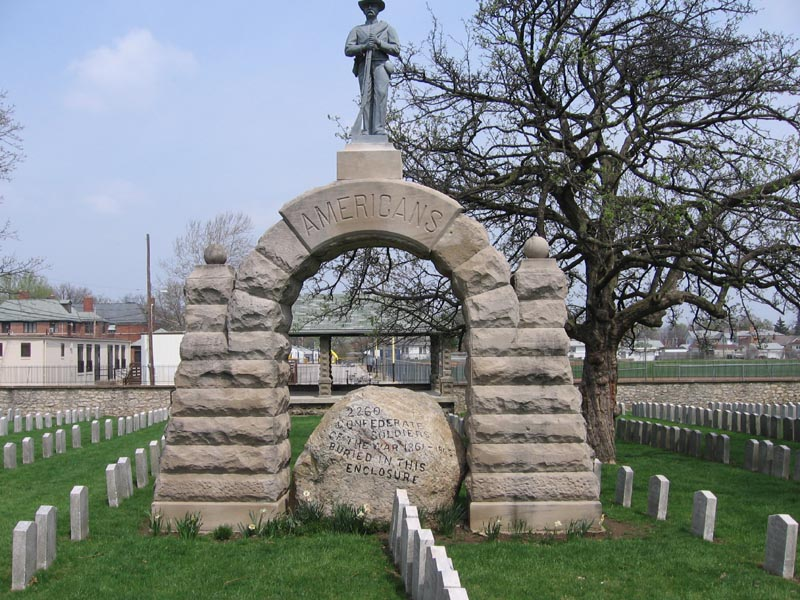
Confederate Soldier Memorial, Camp Chase, Columbus

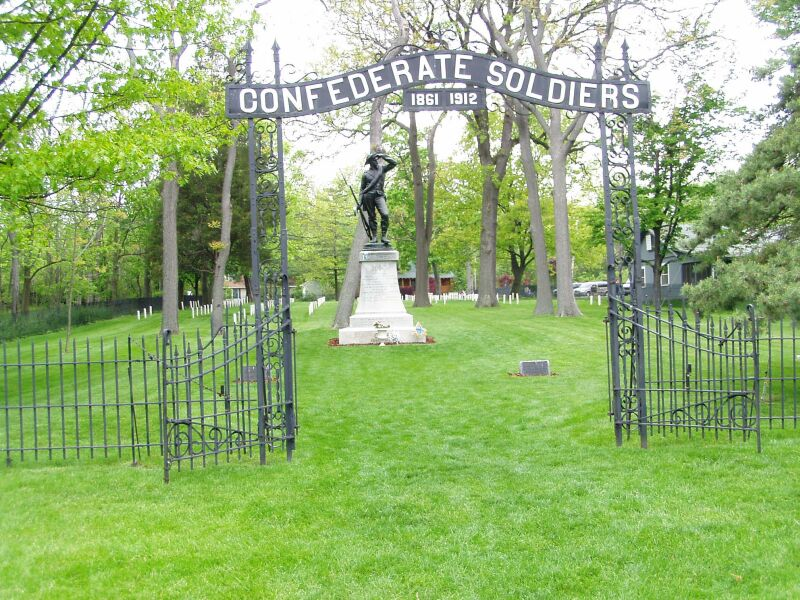
The Lookout (1910), Johnson's Island, Ottawa County

- Columbus: Camp Chase Cemetery's Confederate Soldier Memorial. Dedicated in 1902. Statue on top was toppled and decapitated by vandals in August 2017. The vandals took the head. The Veterans Administration stated that the statue will be repaired. As of October 2018, it is one of 7 cemeteries with Confederate monuments that the Veterans Administration has under 24-hour guard. The statue was repaired by McKay Lodge Art Conservation Laboratory in Oberlin and reinstalled on March 30, 2019.
- Pomeroy: Statue of Confederate general John Hunt Morgan
- Sandusky Bay: Four UDC monuments are located at Confederate Stockade Cemetery on Johnson's Island, the first facility built by the Union Army solely for imprisoning Confederate soldiers As of October 2018, it is one of 7 cemeteries with Confederate monuments that the Veterans Administration has under 24-hour guard.
- West Point: Marker for Battle of Salineville, the northernmost point Confederate forces reached.

=== Inhabited places ===
- Confederate Hills, a neighborhood in Batavia Township named for the Confederate cause that is home to roads named for a CSA leader and various southern locations, notably Stanton Hall and the Natchez Trace.

=== Roads ===
- Batavia Township:
  - Stonewall Ridge, memorializing CSA Gen. Stonewall Jackson.
- Day Heights:
  - Colonel Mosby Drive, memorializing CSA Col. John S. Mosby.
- Fairfield:
  - Robert E Lee Drive, memorializing CSA Gen. Robert E. Lee.
  - Stonewall Lane, memorializing CSA Gen. Stonewall Jackson.
- Mt. Repose:
  - Beauregard Court, memorializing CSA Gen. P. G. T. Beauregard.
  - Jeb Stuart Drive, memorializing CSA Gen. J. E. B. Stuart.
  - Monassas Run Road, memorializing the CSA victory at the battle at Manassas, known to the North as Bull Run.
  - Stonewall Jackson Drive, memorializing CSA Gen. Stonewall Jackson.

=== Schools ===
- Cleveland: John Adams High School uses the Rebels team name, but the mascot more closely resembles a cavalier than a Confederate soldier.
- Mcconnelsville: Morgan High School is named for Confederate General John Hunt Morgan. Their nickname is the "Raiders".
- Willoughby: Willoughby South High School dropped its Confederate uniformed mascot and removed all remaining Confederate imagery from the school while retaining the Rebels team name and school colors grey and blue. In 1993 the school dropped Stars and Bars as the school song and removed Confederate imagery from school uniforms.

== Oklahoma ==
As of 24 June 2020, there are at least 13 public spaces with Confederate monuments in Oklahoma.

=== Buildings ===
- Ardmore: Oklahoma Confederate Home, operated as OK Confederate Home from 1911 to 1942. Renamed Oklahoma Veterans Center after last residing confederate veteran passed.

=== Monuments ===
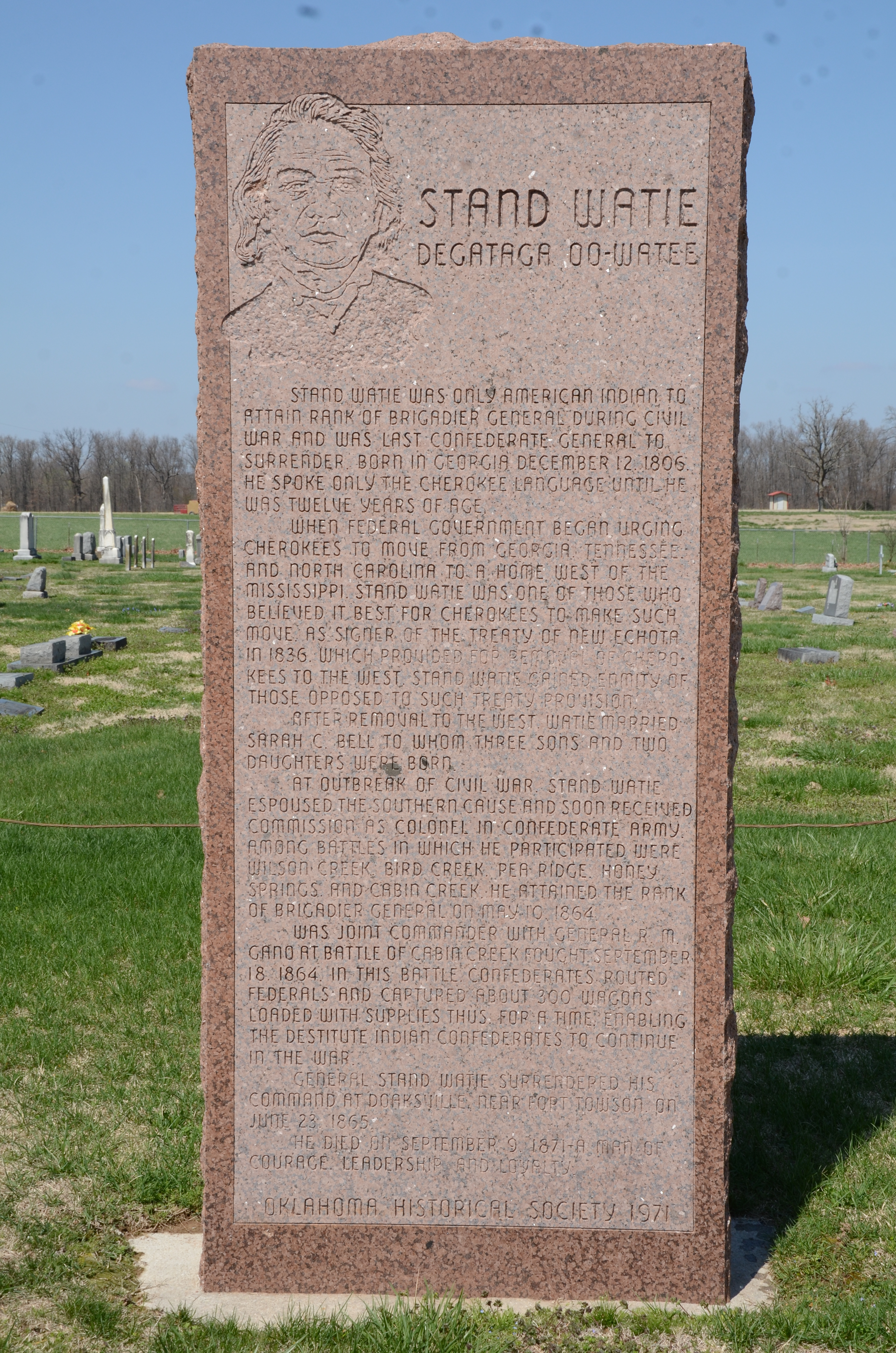
Stand Watie Monument, Polson Cemetery, Delaware County

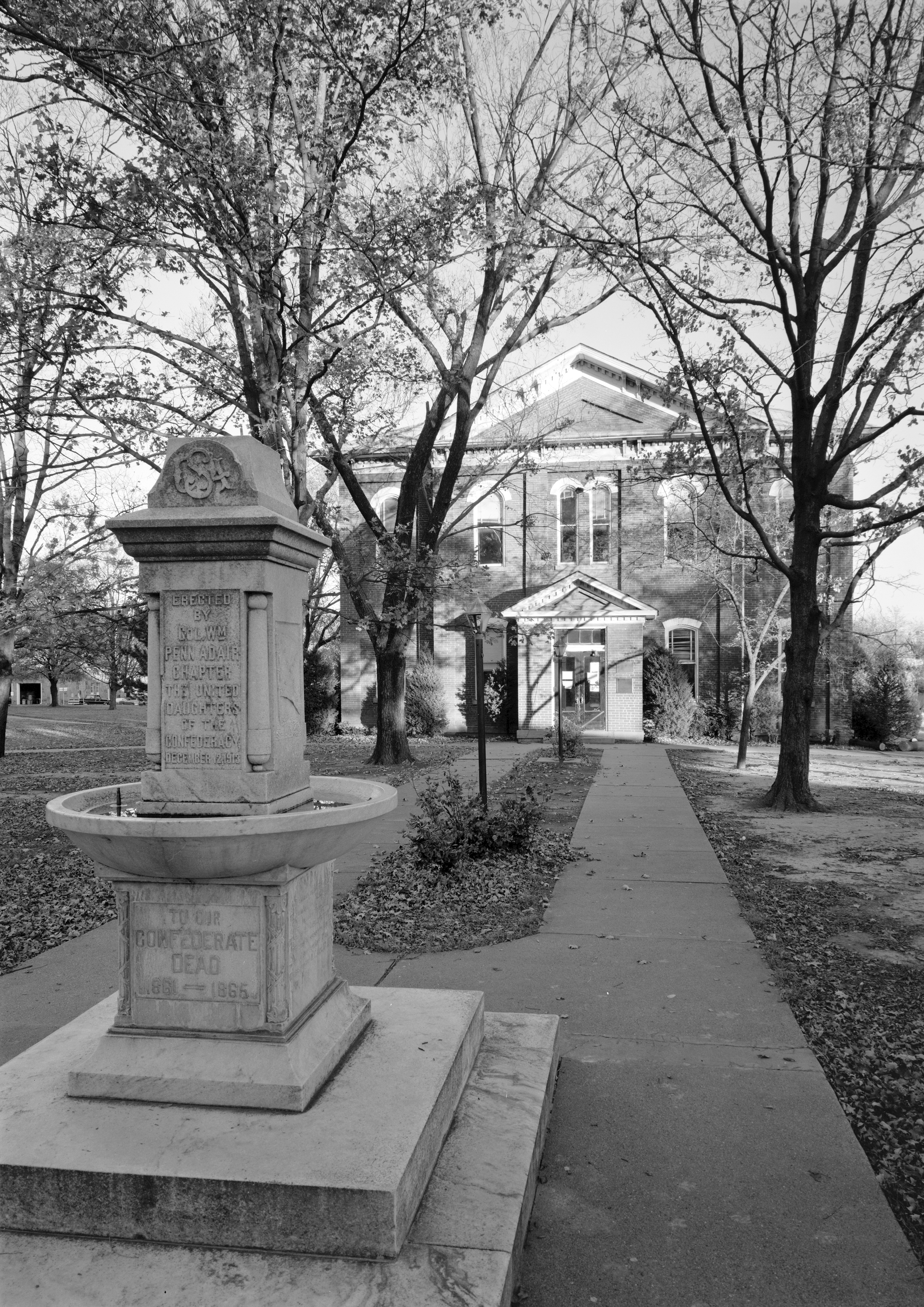
Confederate Monument at Cherokee National Capitol

- Ardmore:
  - Confederate Monument (1910) at Oklahoma Veterans Center (formerly Oklahoma Confederate Home) has pair (CSA and Union) monuments.
  - Confederate Monument (2013) at Rose Hill Cemetery
- Atoka: Two monuments are located at the Confederate Cemetery for soldiers killed in the Battle of Middle Boggy
- Delaware County: Two monuments to CSA General Stand Watie at Polson Cemetery; the first erected c. 1910–20, and the second erected in 1971
- Durant:
  - Confederate Soldier Statue at Bryan County Courthouse, erected in 1917 by UDC. Dedicated in 1918.
  - Confederate Monument at Highland Cemetery
- Hugo: Rose Hill
- Mayes County: Confederate Monument at site of Second Battle of Cabin Creek (1961)
- Oklahoma City: Confederate Monument in Fairlawn Cemetery (1923)
- Oktaha: Memorial in Oktaha Cemetery to Confederate soldiers who died in the Battle of Honey Springs (1940)
- Rentiesville:
  - Confederate Soldiers Monument (1983) in Honey Springs Battlefield by UDC and Children of the Confederacy.
  - Texas Confederates Memorial in Honey Springs Battlefield by UDC
- Tahlequah:
  - Confederate Monument at Cherokee National Capitol (1913). Removed in 2020.
  - Stand Watie Monument (1971). Removed in 2020.
- Wynnewood: Confederate Soldier monument (2004)

=== Schools ===
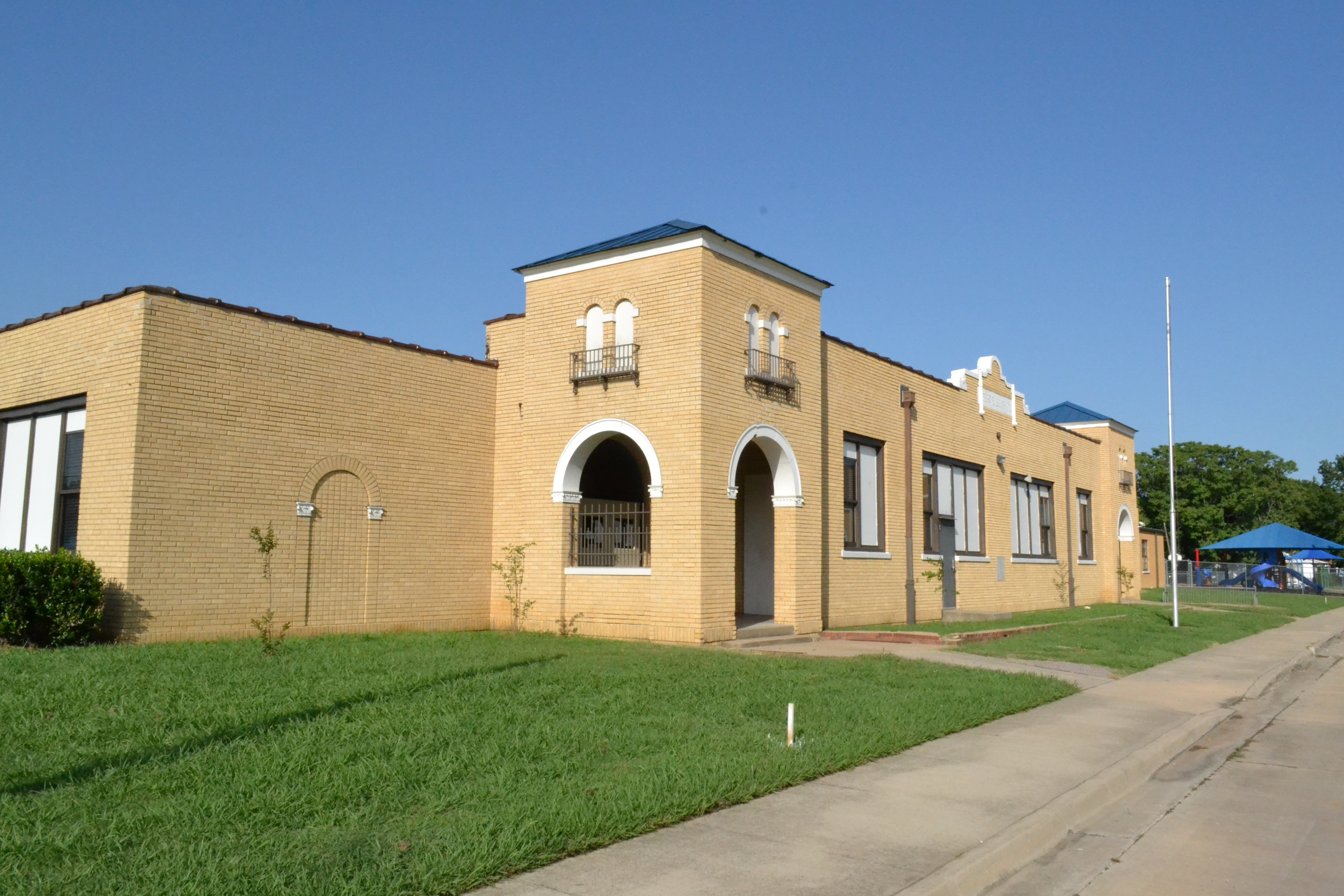
Robert E. Lee School in Durant, Oklahoma

- Durant: Robert E. Lee Elementary School
- Oklahoma City: school board studying renaming in 2017
  - Robert E. Lee Elementary School (1910) -now Adelaide Lee Elementary School.
  - Jackson Elementary School (1910) -now Mary Golda Ross Enterprise Elementary School.
  - Wheeler Elementary School (1910)
  - Stand Watie Elementary School (1930) -now Esperanza Elementary School.
- Pauls Valley: Lee Elementary School

=== Inhabited places ===
- Jackson County (1907) sources dispute if the name is for the CSA General or President Jackson
- Roger Mills County (1907), named for Roger Q. Mills, Confederate colonel and later Congressman and U.S. Senator.
- Town of Stonewall (1874) for Stonewall Jackson

=== Roads ===
- Jay: Stand Watie Road

== Oregon ==
As of 24 June 2020, there are no public spaces with Confederate monuments in Oregon.

== Pennsylvania ==
As of 24 June 2020, there are at least 3 public spaces with Confederate monuments in Pennsylvania.

=== Monuments ===
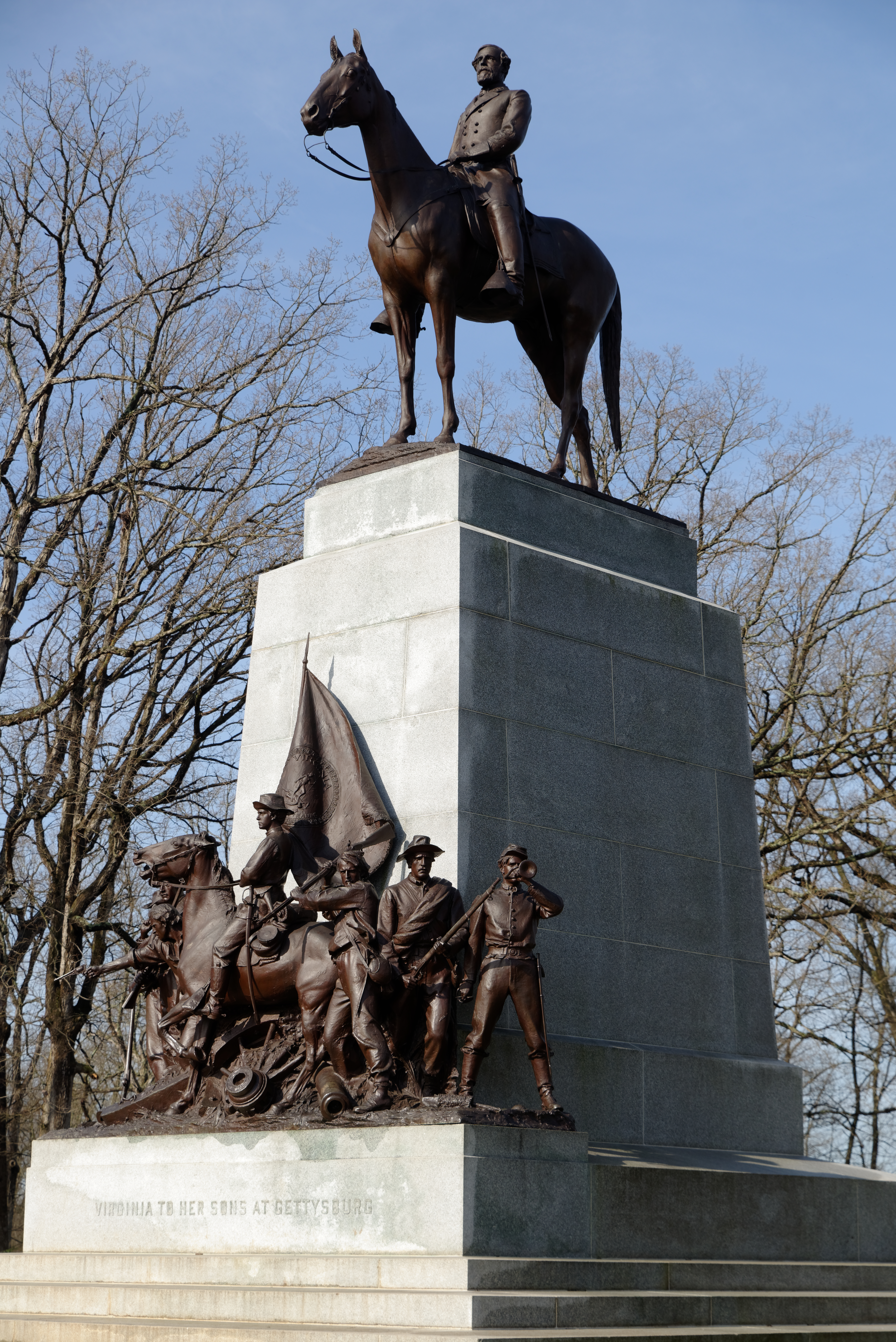
Virginia State Monument (1917), Gettysburg Battlefield.

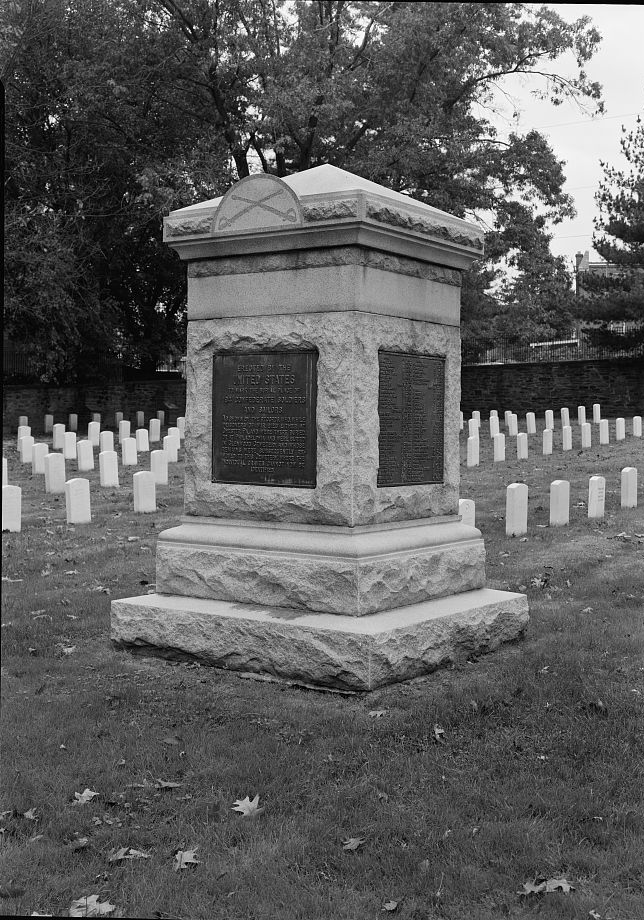
Confederate Soldiers and Sailors Monument (1911), Philadelphia National Cemetery.

- Gettysburg: Gettysburg Battlefield. In addition to the monuments listed below, the battlefield features monuments to specific Confederate units.
  - Alabama State Monument (1933), Joseph Urner, sculptor.
  - Arkansas State Monument (1966)
  - "Armistead's Last Stand" Marker, for Brig. Gen. Lewis A. Armistead (1887)
  - Army of Northern Virginia Marker (1908)
  - Culp Brothers Memorial (2013), Gary Casteel, sculptor, near entrance Gettysburg Heritage Center. Honors brothers who fought on opposite sides: Confederate Private Wesley Culp and Union Lieutenant William Culp ("Brother against Brother").
  - Lt. Gen. Richard S. Ewell's Headquarters Marker (1920)
  - Florida State Monument (1963)
  - Georgia State Monument (1961)
  - High Water Mark of the Rebellion Monument (1892)
  - Lt. Gen. Ambrose P. Hill's Headquarters Marker (1920)
  - Gen. Robert E. Lee Equestrian Statue (1917), atop the Virginia State Monument
  - Gen. Robert E. Lee Headquarters Marker (1920)
  - Lt. Gen. James Longstreet Equestrian Statue (1998)
  - Lt. Gen. James Longstreet Headquarters Marker (1907)
  - Louisiana State Monument (1971), Donald De Lue, sculptor
  - Maryland State Monument (1994). Honors Maryland soldiers on both the Union and Confederate sides.
  - Mississippi State Monument (1973), Donald De Lue, sculptor
  - North Carolina State Monument (1929), Gutzon Borglum, sculptor. Borglum was also the first sculptor on the Stone Mountain#Confederate Memorial Carving project.
  - North Carolina Memorial Tablet
  - Soldiers and Sailors of the Confederacy Monument (1965), Donald De Lue, sculptor
  - South Carolina State Monument (1963)
  - Tennessee State Monument (1982)
  - Texas State Monument (1964)
  - Virginia State Monument (1917), Frederick William Sievers, sculptor. Features a larger-than-life sculpture group, "Virginia to Her Sons at Gettysburg;" and is topped by an equestrian statue of Gen. Robert E. Lee. The National Park Service says the monument will not be removed.
- McConnellsburg
  - Confederate Soldiers Monument, dedicated in 1929.
  - Last Confederate Bivouac Monument, dedicated in 1930.
- Philadelphia: Confederate Soldiers and Sailors Monument (1911), Philadelphia National Cemetery. Commemorates 184 Confederate prisoners of war who died in Philadelphia area hospitals and camps.

=== Roads ===
- Gettysburg: Confederate Avenue
- McConnellsburg: Confederate Lane

== Rhode Island ==
As of 24 June 2020, there are no public spaces with Confederate monuments in Rhode Island.

== South Carolina ==
Gaffney Confederate Monument, Gaffney, South Carolina

As of 24 June 2020, there are at least 194 public spaces with Confederate monuments in South Carolina.

== South Dakota ==
In July 2020 the Confederate flag was removed from the patch of Gettysburg South Dakota police officers.

As of June 24, 2020, there is at least one public space with Confederate monuments in South Dakota.

- Gettysburg: The Gettysburg police uniforms feature a patch with overlapping U.S. and Confederate flags and a civil-war era cannon along with the city's name, in a nod to the city's namesake, Gettysburg, Pennsylvania, site of the famous Battle of Gettysburg. The historical reference logo for the police emblem and uniform patch was designed in 2009.

== Tennessee ==
As of 24 June 2020, there are at least 105 public spaces with Confederate monuments in Tennessee. The Tennessee Heritage Protection Act (2016) and a 2013 law restrict the removal of statues and memorials.

The Tennessee legislature designated Confederate Decoration Day, the origin of Memorial Day, as June 3, and in 1969 designated January 19 and July 13, their birthdays, as Robert E. Lee Day and Nathan Bedford Forrest day respectively.

=== State capitol ===
- Nathan Bedford Forrest Bust. On display in the Capital rotunda since 1978. Former governor Bill Haslam wished to remove it, but he was not supported by the Legislature or the Capitol Commission. "In 2010, the state moved the Forrest bust from outside the doors of the House of Representatives' chamber to its current location between the legislature's two chambers. It was relocated in order to make room for a bust of Sampson Keeble, Tennessee's first black legislator." In January 2019 a group of students demonstrated at the capital, calling for its removal.

=== Buildings ===
- Greeneville: General Morgan Inn, located at the spot where Confederate general John Hunt Morgan was killed.
- Harrogate: Timeline: Learn more about the history of the Lincoln Memorial University Grant Lee Building at Lincoln Memorial University was named in honor of the two famous civil war generals. Lincoln Memorial University was named in honor of Abraham Lincoln.
- Murfreesboro: Forrest Hall at Middle Tennessee State University. The Tennessee Board of Regents has unanimously recommended the name change, on the recommendation of a campus task force, and the university president, but it has yet to pass the Tennessee Historical Commission, which plans "public hearings."

=== Monuments ===
==== Courthouse monuments ====
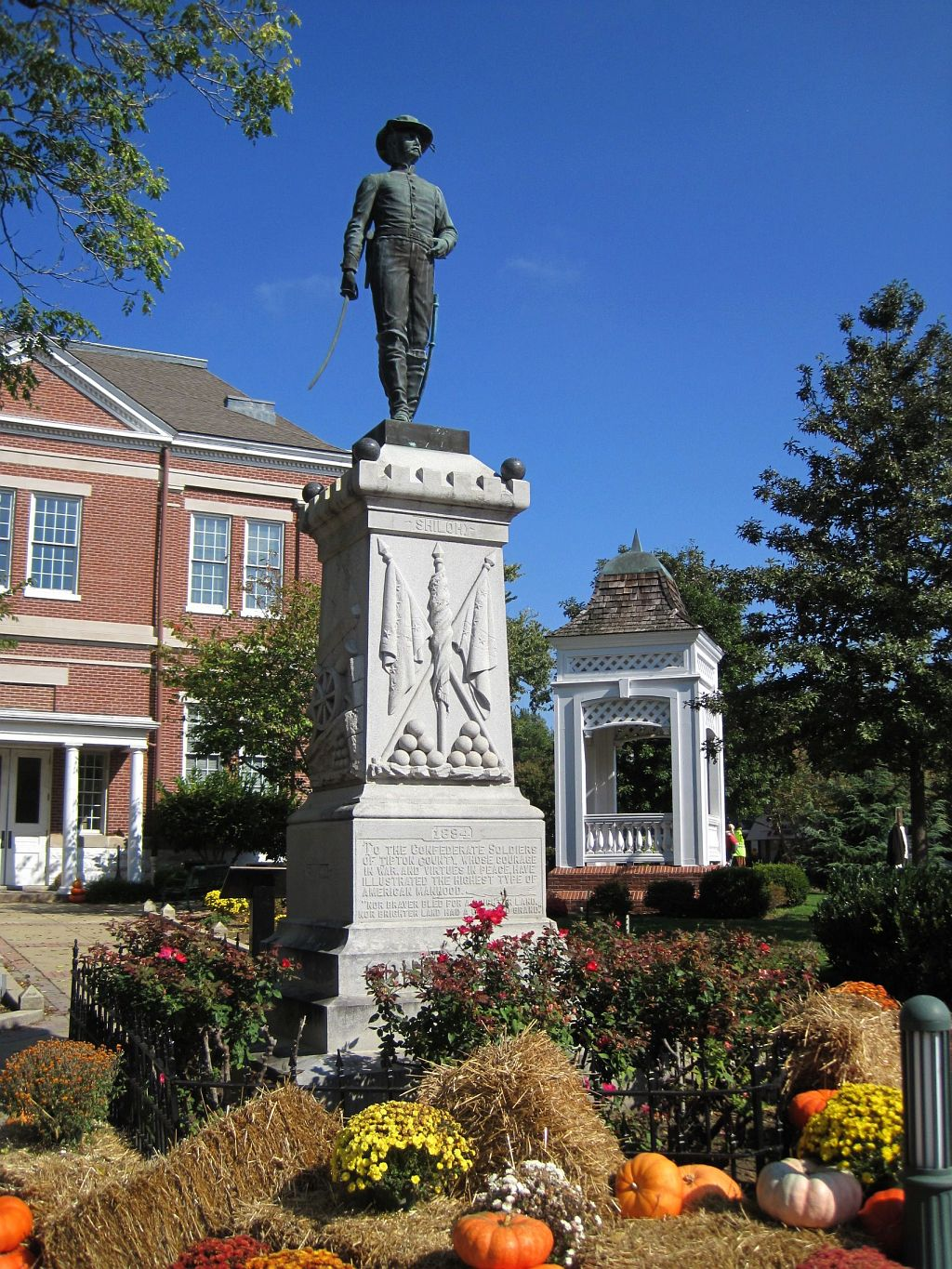
Tipton County Courthouse, Covington

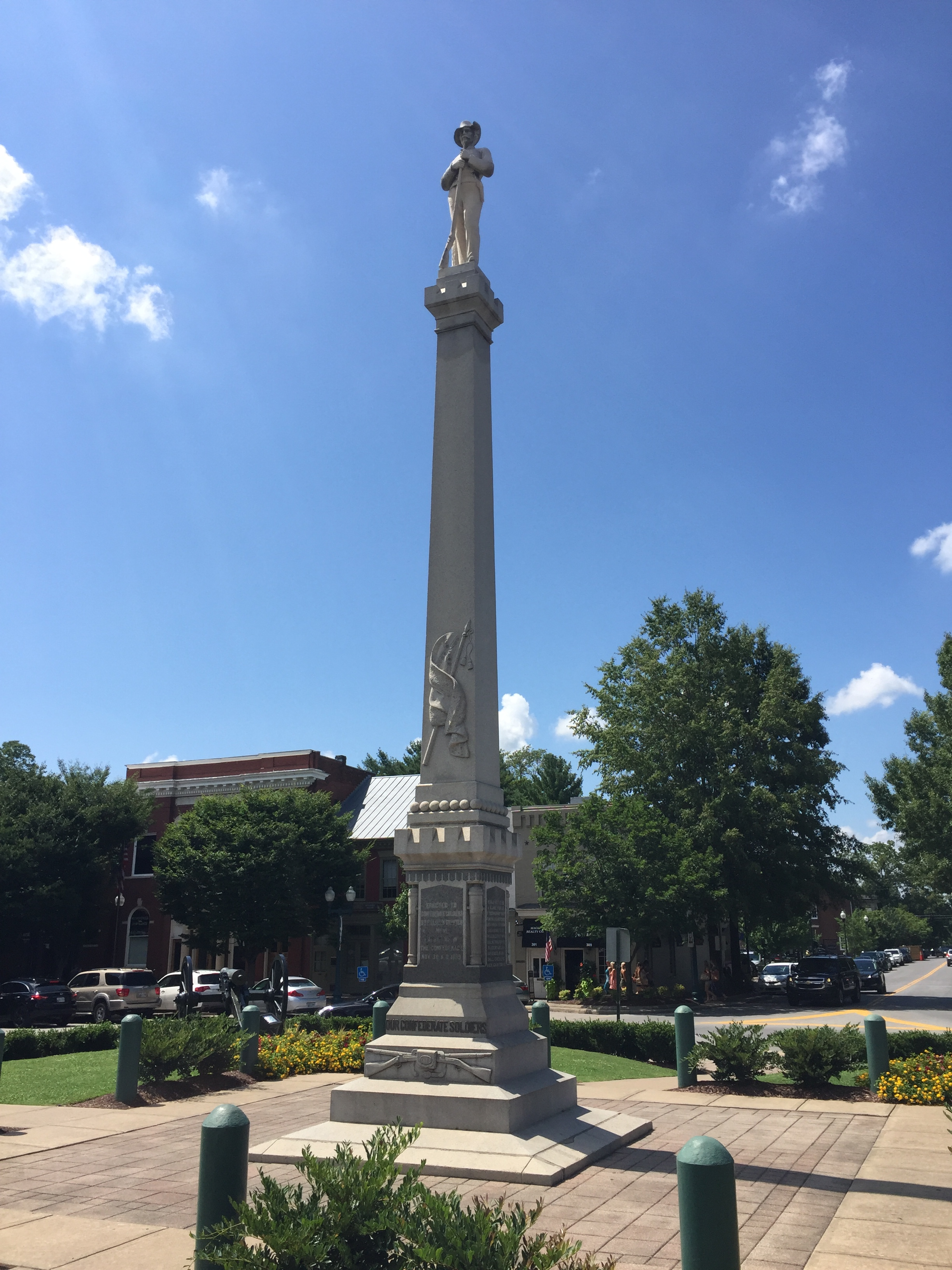
Confederate Monument "Chip", Franklin

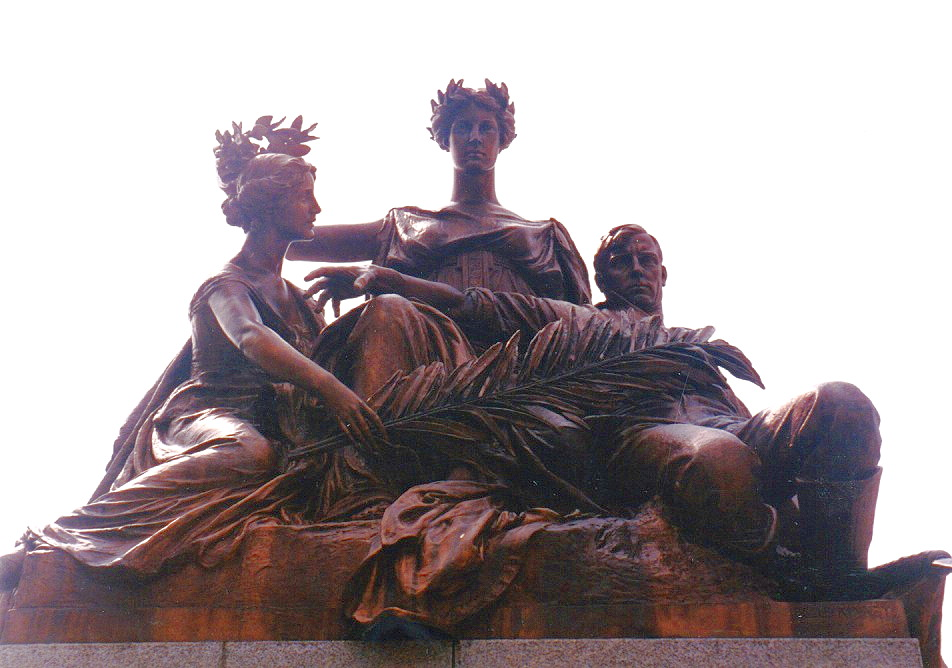
Confederate Women monument, Nashville

- Benton: Confederate memorial (2009)
- Blountville: Confederate Memorial (1928)
- Bolivar: Monument to the Memory of Fallen Confederate Sons (1873)
- Brownsville: Confederate Memorial (1909)
- Carthage:
  - Smith County Confederate Monument
  - Smith County War Memorial (1976)
- Charlotte:
  - Confederate Monument (2001): "Confederate Veterans Memorial honoring those from Dickson County who served the CSA."
  - Confederate Veterans Memorial (2012) "honoring gallant soldiers, veterans and their families."
- Cleveland: United Daughters of the Confederacy Monument (1911)
- Cookeville: Eternal Flame, honors all Putnam County veterans
- Covington: Confederate Monument (1895)
- Decaturville: Confederate Monument
- Dover: Fort Donelson. The Confederate fort was named for CSA General Daniel Smith Donelson but captured by Union General Grant in 1862, who retained the Fort's name saying "Fort Donelson will hereafter be marked in Capitals on the maps of our United Country..." Also contains Confederate Monument donated by United Daughters of the Confederacy in 1933.
- Dresden: Weakley County Confederate Monument (1915)
- Dyersburg:
  - Confederate Monument (1905)
  - United Confederate Veterans Civil War Plaques (1926)
- Erwin: War Memorial
- Fayetteville:
  - Civil War Memorial in memory of the three thousand Confederate soldiers of Lincoln County (1906)
  - Women's Monument to those who kept up the responsibilities of farms and businesses during the Civil War (1904)
- Franklin: "Our Confederate Soldiers" Monument (1899), UDC monument known locally as "Chip" memorializes soldiers who died in the Battle of Franklin. Since by state law it cannot be removed, the city of Franklin, with "broad support", wants to install historic markers "depicting the experience of the African-Americans before, during, and after the Civil War." The UDC opposes this, claiming ownership of the Public Square. As of December 2018, the issue is in litigation.
- Greeneville: John Hunt Morgan Memorial
- Jackson: "Our Confederate Dead" Monument (1888)
- Lafayette: Macon County Confederate Monument (2001)
- Lebanon:
  - 1901 monument to the Confederacy
  - 2011 memorial to those from the County who served in the Army of Tennessee.
  - General Robert Hopkins Hatton marker (1912)
- Lewisburg: Confederate Soldier Monument (1904)
- Manchester: Erected 1991 by United Daughters of the Confederacy.
- McMinnville: Warren County Civil War Memorial (2004)
- Murfreesboro:
  - Rutherford County Confederate Memorial (1901)
  - Rutherford County Confederate Veterans Memorial (2011)
  - Nathan Bedford Forrest Memorial Tablet (1912)
- Nashville: Tennessee Confederate Women's Monument, Belle Kinney Scholz, sculptor (1926)
- Paris: Confederate Monument (1900)
- Pulaski: "Rebel Martyr" Sam Davis Statue (1906)
- Savannah: Confederate Monument (1995)
- Selmer: Confederate Memorial (1994)
- Shelbyville: Confederate Memorial in Memory of the "Shelbyville Rebels" Company F 41st Tennessee Regiment CSA (1937)
- Smithville: DeKalb County Confederate Monument (1996)
- Spencer: Confederate Monument (1988)
- Springfield: Confederate Monuments (two monuments) (1997, 2012)
- Trenton: Oakland Cemetery: Confederate Monument commissioned by the United Daughters of the Confederacy in 1900 and Confederate marker commissioned by the Sons of Confederate Veterans in 1990. Listed on the NRHP.
- Union City: Confederate Monument (1869)
- Waynesboro: Confederate Monument (2003)

==== Other public monuments ====
- Altamont: Confederate Memorial (1896), depicting flags of the Confederacy
- Beechgrove:
  - Nathan Bedford Forrest monument, in Beechgrove Confederate Cemetery.
  - Memorial to the 20th Tennessee Volunteer Infantry (2008), in Beechgrove Confederate Cemetery.
- Centerville: Confederate Civil War Memorial Plaque
- Chapel Hill: Obelisk with Confederate flag on the site where Nathan Bedford Forrest was born. There is also "a medallion-shaped monument outside city hall" with a Confederate flag.
- Chattanooga: statue of Alexander P. Stewart, a confederate lieutenant, in front of the Chattanooga/Hamilton County Courthouse. (1919) Efforts have been made to remove this statue.
- Clarksville: Confederate Monument (1893), Greenwood Cemetery
- Clifton: Nathan Bedford Forrest Memorial
- Columbia: Confederate "Funeral Rest" Memorial, Rose Hill Cemetery (1882)
- Cookeville: Confederate Memorial, Cookeville Cemetery (2004)
- Covington: Nathan Bedford Forrest Memorial, Tipton County Museum (1998)
- Crossville: Confederate and Union Memorial
- Denmark: Britton Lane Confederate Monument (1897)
- Dover: Confederate Monument, Fort Donelson (1933)
- Dyersburg: Confederate monument (2004), Old City Cemetery
- Erwin: Confederate Memorial, Ohio Avenue (1903)

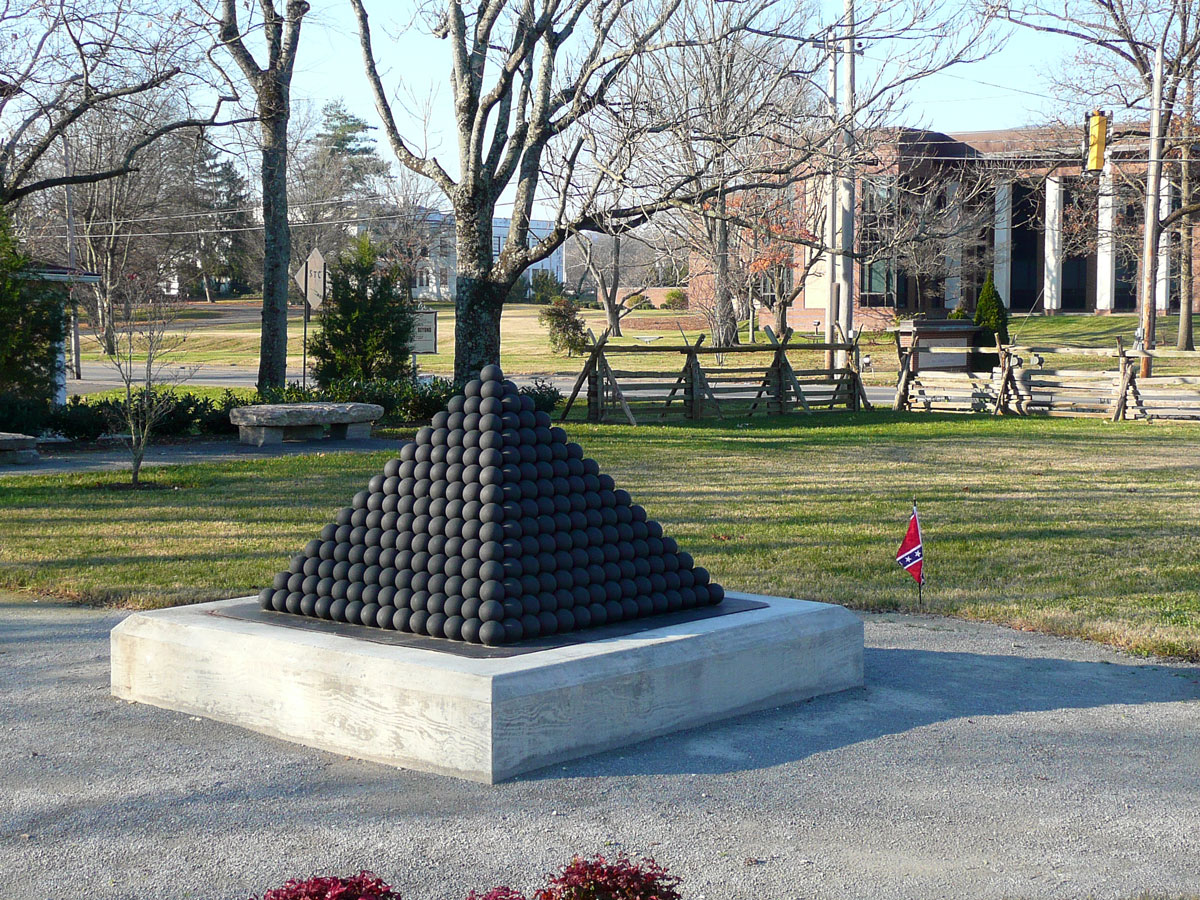
Pyramid of cannonballs commemorate Patrick Cleburne in Franklin, Tennessee

- Franklin: Confederal "Funeral Rest" Memorial, Rose Hill Cemetery
  - Cannonballs are stacked in a pyramid to commemorate where CSA General Patrick Cleburne died in the Battle of Franklin
- Gallatin: Confederate Soldiers Monument (1903)
- Hamilton County: Chickamauga & Chattanooga National Military Park. Numerous monuments and memorials to Confederate soldiers and units, as well as Union monuments.
- Humboldt: Confederate Monument (1900), Bailey Park
- Knoxville:
  - A stone monument was erected in 1914 by the United Daughters of the Confederacy at the corner of 17th Street and Laurel Avenue, in the Fort Sanders neighborhood, defaced in August 2017.
  - Knoxville National Cemetery
  - Monument to the Confederate dead (1892), Bethel Avenue
  - Bleak House, historical house that was formerly the headquarters of General James Longstreet and Lafayette McLaws. It is also known as the Confederate Memorial Hall.
  - Historical marker, with Confederate flag, in front of Immaculate Conception Church, for Father Abram Ryan, called "Poet of the Confederacy".
- Lebanon:
  - Confederate Memorial Gen. Hatton Statue (1912)
  - Rutherford County: grounds around the County Courthouse contain a 1901 monument to the Confederacy and a 2011 memorial to those from the County who served in the Army of Tennessee.
- Lynchburg: Confederate Veterans Memorial, Moore County Public Square
- Memphis:
  - Monument to Captain J. Harvey Mathes, 37th Tennessee CSA
  - Confederate Memorial (1878), Elmwood Cemetery, 824 Dudley Street
- Mount Pleasant: Confederate Monument (1907)
- Mulberry: Confederate Memorial (1909)
- Murfreesboro: Confederate Circle in Evergreen Cemetery was established in 1891 as a memorial to approximately 2,000 Confederate soldiers whose remains were reinterred there.
- Nashville:
  - Confederate Private Monument (1909) in Centennial Park.
  - Confederate Gallery, Ryman Auditorium
  - Mount Olivet Cemetery had a burial and memorial area established by a ladies group shortly after the Civil War which became known as Confederate Circle.
  - The Hermitage: UDC monument and gates (1941) at the Tennessee Confederate Soldiers Cemetery
- Obion: Obion Veterans Memorial, honoring those who were killed in service and were MIA-POW in Civil War, World Wars I & II, Korea, Vietnam, Desert Storm, Afghanistan and Iraq (2006)
- Parkers Crossroads:
  - Freeman's Battery (2002)
  - Morton's Battery (2007)
- Pulaski:
  - Seventh Kentucky Mounted Infantry Memorial (1911)
  - Confederate subsection with a Confederate monument dedicated by the United Daughters of the Confederacy in 1913, Maplewood Cemetery.
- Santa Fe: Memorial plaque to Maury [County] Light Artillery (Confederate), public square.
- Tazewell: Confederate memorial (2000) honoring unknown Confederate dead; located in Irish Memorial Cemetery.
- Trimble: Cemetery Ridge Memorial Plaza, honoring Merion Spence Parks and Williams Hamilton Parks II, members of UDC and SCV respectively (2012)
- Union City
  - Confederate Monument, Kiwanis Park (1909)
  - Confederate Monument to Unknown Soldiers, Old Soldiers' Cemetery, Summer Street at Edwards Street (1869)
- Winchester
  - UDC Memorial to Confederate soldiers (1950), City Cemetery
  - SCV Memorial to Confederate soldiers (2003), Confederate Cemetery, adjoining the City Cemetery"
- Woodbury: 1926 monument "honors all confederate soldiers and marks the spot where CSA Lt. Col. John B. Hutchenson was killed."

==== Private monuments ====
- Nashville
  - Nathan Bedford Forrest Statue, made of fiberglass over foam, 25 feet high, on private land near Interstate 65, installed in 1998, built with private money. It is surrounded by Confederate battle flags, constituting what the owner calls "Confederate Flag Park." (No government recognizes it as a park, and the entrance is chained shut with a "No Trespassing" sign.) The giant statue is visible from the highway to anyone entering the city from the south. It has been called "hideous" and "ridiculous." There have been numerous calls for its removal. Tennessee Governor Bill Haslam said: "It's not a statue that I like and [ sic ] that most Tennesseans are proud of in any way." Former Nashville Mayor Megan Barry called the statue "an offensive display of hatred." In 2015, Nashville's Metro Council voted to petition the Tennessee Department of Transportation to plant obscuring vegetation; the Department declined, because it is private land. ("Never mind that the T.D.O.T. itself removed the obscuring vegetation back in 1998, when the statue was first erected.") There has been occasional vandalism; in December 2017 it was covered in "pussy-hat pink" paint, which Bill Dorris, current owner of the land, says he intends to leave. He also said that if trees are planted to block the view from I-65, he "would make the statue taller." It was sculpted, at no charge, by notorious racist Jack Kershaw, an attorney for Martin Luther King's murderer, famous for having said "Somebody needs to say a good word for slavery."

=== Inhabited place ===
- Dixie Lee Junction, an unincorporated community where the Dixie and Lee Highways intersect.

=== Parks ===
- Eva: Nathan Bedford Forrest State Park (1963)
- Franklin: Confederate Memorial Park at Winstead Hill Park

=== Roads ===
- Brentwood
  - Jefferson Davis Drive
  - Robert E. Lee Lane
- Culleoka: General Lee Road
- Dandridge
  - Jeb Stuart Drive
  - Stonewall Jackson Drive
- Elizabethton: Stonewall Jackson Drive
- Eva: Jeff Davis Drive
- Forest Hills: Robert E. Lee Drive
- Franklin:
  - General J.B. Hood Drive
  - General Nathan Bedford Forrest Drive
  - Jeb Stuart Drive
  - Jefferson Davis Drive
- Gallatin: Robert Lee Drive
- Nashville:
  - Beauregard Drive
  - Jefferson Davis Drive
  - Confederate Drive
  - General Forrest Court
  - Robert E. Lee Court
  - Robert E. Lee Drives (two different streets with the same name)
- Newport
  - Robert E. Lee Drive
  - Stonewall Jackson Drive
- Oak Hill: Stonewall Jackson Court
- Pulaski
  - Sam Davis Avenue
  - Sam Davis Trail
- Sardis: Jeff Davis Lane
- Smyrna
  - Jeb Stuart Drive
  - Lee Lane
  - Longstreet Drive
  - Robert E. Lee Lane
  - Sam Davis Road
  - Stonewall Drive

=== Schools ===
- Chapel Hill: Forrest High School
- Nashville: Father Ryan High School, named for Abram Ryan, called "Poet of the Confederacy".
- Paris: Robert E. Lee School – now called Paris Academy for the Arts.
- Sewanee: The University of the South: "Nowhere is the issue of Confederate remembrance more nettlesome than at Sewanee, whose origin[s] are entwined with the antebellum South and the Confederacy." Confederate flags are in stained glass windows of the chapel, as is the Seal of the Confederacy. It benefited greatly at its founding by a large gift from John Armfield, at one time co-owner of Franklin and Armfield, the largest and most prosperous slave trading enterprise in the country. Students as late as 1871 were required to wear uniforms of "cadet gray cloth". Confederate flags hung in the chapel from its dedication in 1909 until the mid-1990s when they were removed "reportedly to improve acoustics". There is an official portrait hanging at the University of Bishop Leonidas Polk, "an ardent defender of slavery," who was in charge of the celebration of the cornerstone laying in 1857, and said the new university will "materially aid the South to resist and repel a fanatical domination which seeks to rule over us." He resigned his ecclesiastical position to become a major general in the Confederate army (called "Sewanee's Fighting Bishop"), and died in battle in 1864. His official portrait at the University depicts him dressed as a bishop with his army uniform hanging nearby. However, his portrait was moved from Convocation Hall to Archives and Special Collections in 2015. The Confederate flag was also emblazoned on the university mace that led processions marking the beginning and ending of the term from 1965 until 1997. At a special chapel service to celebrate Jefferson Davis' birthday, the Ceremonial Mace was consecrated to the memory of Nathan Bedford Forrest, the first Grand Wizard of the Ku Klux Klan, by Bishop Charles C. J. Carpenter of Alabama – one of the clergy who opposed Dr. Martin Luther King Jr.'s activities in Birmingham in 1963 (see A Call for Unity), prompting King to write his "Letter from a Birmingham Jail" in response.
  - The Vice Chancellor is the chief academic officer at the university; the chancellor is a bishop of the Episcopal church. Jefferson Davis and Robert E. Lee both turned down offers of the position. (Sewanee has a portrait of Davis.) The first vice chancellor was Rt. Rev. Charles Todd Quintard, called "chaplain of the Confederacy". He compiled the Confederate Soldiers' Pocket Manual of Devotions (Charleston, 1863).
  - The university's chief donor was John Armfield, at the time co-owner of Franklin and Armfield, the largest slave-trading firm in the U.S. He purchased the site and gave the university an endowment of $25,000 a year. In addition to Polk, Bishop Stephen Elliott, the first and only Presiding Bishop of the Protestant Episcopal Church in the Confederate States of America, and Bishop James Hervey Otey, later prominent in the Confederacy, were significant founders of the university. Generals Edmund Kirby Smith, Josiah Gorgas, and Francis A. Shoup were prominent in the university's postbellum revival and continuance.

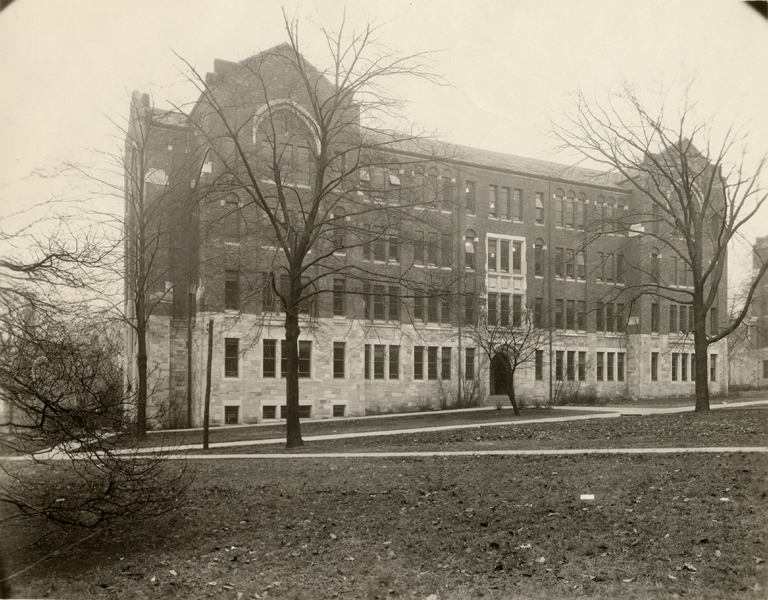
Calhoun Hall, named for slave owner and Confederate supporter W. H. Calhoun.

- Vanderbilt University:
  - Calhoun Hall, named for William Henry Calhoun, a slave owner, Odd Fellows Grand Master and silversmith who was arrested for his Confederate support on the order of Union Brigadier General Robert Byington Mitchell pending the release of Union prisoners in 1863.
  - Portrait of Confederate General Edmund Kirby Smith by Cornelius Hankins in the Wyatt Center. Smith served as the chancellor of the University of Nashville from 1870 to 1875.
  - Marble bust of Confederate Colonel and Board of Trust Treasurer Edmund William Cole in Kirkland Hall, the administration building. He is also the namesake of the annual Cole Lecture.
  - The campus includes several buildings tied to slavery and the Confederacy, like McTyeire Hall (named for pro-slavery essayist Holland Nimmons McTyeire) and Elliston Hall (named for Elizabeth Boddie Elliston of the Burlington Plantation, who owned slaves).

=== Tourist sites ===
- Pigeon Forge: "Rebel Railroad" was a small theme park built in 1961, its main attraction being a simulated Confederate steam train which afforded "'good Confederate citizens' the opportunity to ride a five mile train route through 'hostile' territory and to help repel a Yankee assault on the train". Rebel Railroad was purchased in 1970 by Art Modell, owner of the Cleveland Browns. In 2018 it is operating under the name Dollywood.
- Morristown, General Longstreet Headquarters Museum

== Texas ==
As of 24 June 2020, there are at least 205 public spaces with Confederate monuments in Texas. "Nowhere has the national re-examination of Confederate emblems been more riven with controversy than the Lone Star State."

=== State capitol ===
- "The Texas Capitol itself is a Confederate monument," according to then-Land Commissioner Jerry E. Patterson. The Texas Confederate Museum was once housed in the Capitol.
  - Confederate Soldiers Monument (1903) features four bronze figures representing the Confederate artillery, cavalry, infantry, and navy. A bronze statue of Jefferson Davis stands above them. The inscription reads: "Died for state rights guaranteed under the constitution. The people of the South, animated by the spirit of 1776, to preserve their rights, withdrew from the federal compact in 1861. The North resorted to coercion. The South, against overwhelming numbers and resources, fought until exhausted."
  - Hood's Texas Brigade, a monument "to memorialize those [who] fought for the Confederacy". "The monument includes a depiction of a Confederate soldier, quotes by Confederate leaders, a flag of the Confederacy and the Confederate battle flag." These are the only Confederate flags currently (2017) visible in the Capitol. Representative Eric Johnson has called for its removal.
  - Terry's Texas Rangers Monument, a monument "to memorialize those [who] fought for the Confederacy" (1907).

=== State symbols ===
Seal of Texas

- The reverse side of the Seal of Texas (1992) includes "the unfurled flags of the Kingdom of France, the Kingdom of Spain, the United Mexican States, the Republic of Texas, the Confederate States of America, and the United States of America". The Confederate flag is rendered as the Stars and Bars.

=== State holiday ===
- Confederate Heroes Day is celebrated on January 19. State employees have the day off.
- April is Confederate History Month in Texas.

=== Buildings ===
- Austin
  - The John H. Reagan state office building is located at 1400 Congress.

=== Monuments ===
Many monuments were donated by pro-Confederacy groups like Daughters of the Confederacy. County governments at the time voted to accept the gifts and take ownership of the statues.

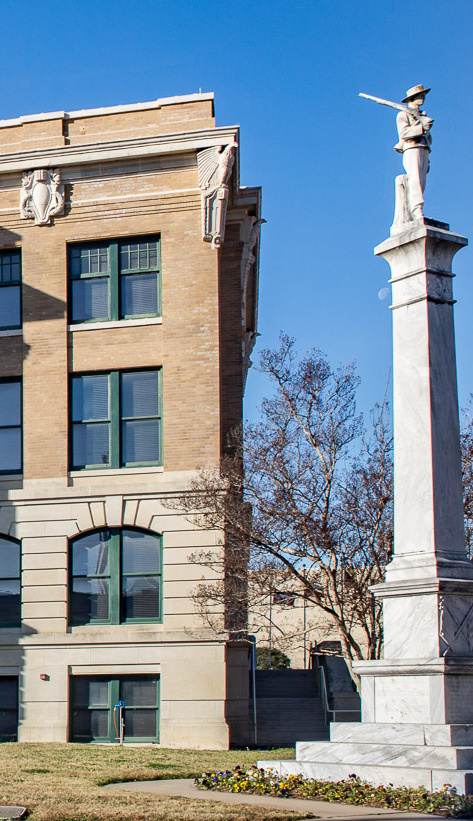
Detail of Cooke County Courthouse monument. Inscription reads “no nation rose so white and fair none fell so pure of crime”

==== Courthouse monuments ====
- Alpine: Confederate Colonel Henry Percy Brewster (1963)
- Aspermont: Historical marker, "County Named for Confederate Hero Stonewall Jackson", Stonewall County Courthouse (1963)
- Bastrop: Monuments at Bastrop County Courthouse include:
  - Confederate Soldiers' Monument (1910)
  - Historical marker, "Home Town of Texas Confederate Major Joseph D. Sayers" (1963)
- Bay City: Confederate Soldiers' Monument (1913), Matagorda County Courthouse
- Belton: Confederate Soldiers' Monument, Bell County Courthouse
- Bonham: Confederate Soldiers' Monument (1905), Fannin County Courthouse
- Bryan: Commemorative marker, erected 1965, to the Brazos County Confederate Commissioners Court.
- Comanche: Confederate Soldiers' Monument (2002), Comanche County Courthouse
- Corsicana: Call to Arms (Confederate Soldiers' Monument), by Louis Amateis (1907), Navarro County Courthouse. A Civil War bugler stands in uniform holding a bugle to his mouth with his proper right hand. He holds a sword in his proper left hand at his side. He wears a hat with a feather in it and knee-high boots. A bedroll is slung over his proper left shoulder and strapped across his chest and proper right hip. The sculpture is mounted on a rectangular base. "Isaac O'Haver was a member of Co K of the 17th VA Cavalry. He was a 17 year-old bugler for his unit. He was born Sep. 20, 1844 and died at the age of 27 on March 30, 1872. He is buried at the Ladoga Cemetery." The plaques on the monument read:
  - South side: The Call to Arms Erected 1907 by Navarro chapter United Daughters of the Confederacy To commemorate the valor and heroism of our Confederate Soldiers It is not in the power of mortals to command success The Confederate Soldier did more – he deserved it. "But their fame on brightest pages penned by poets and by pages Shall go sounding down the ages"
  - West side: "Nor shall your glory be fought while fame her record keeps or honor points the hollowed spot where valor proudly sleeps" "Tell it as you may It never can be told Sing it as you Will It never can be sung The Story of the Glory of the men who wore the gray"
  - East side: "It is a duty we owe the dead who died for us: – But where memories can never die – It is a duty we owe to posterity to see that our children shall know the virtues And rise worthy of their sires".
  - North side: The soldiers of the Southern Confederacy fought valiantly for The liberty of state bequeathed them By their forefathers of 1776 "Who Glorified Their righteous cause and they who made The sacrifice supreme in That they died To keep their country free"
- Clarksville: Confederate Soldiers' Monument, Red River County County Courthouse

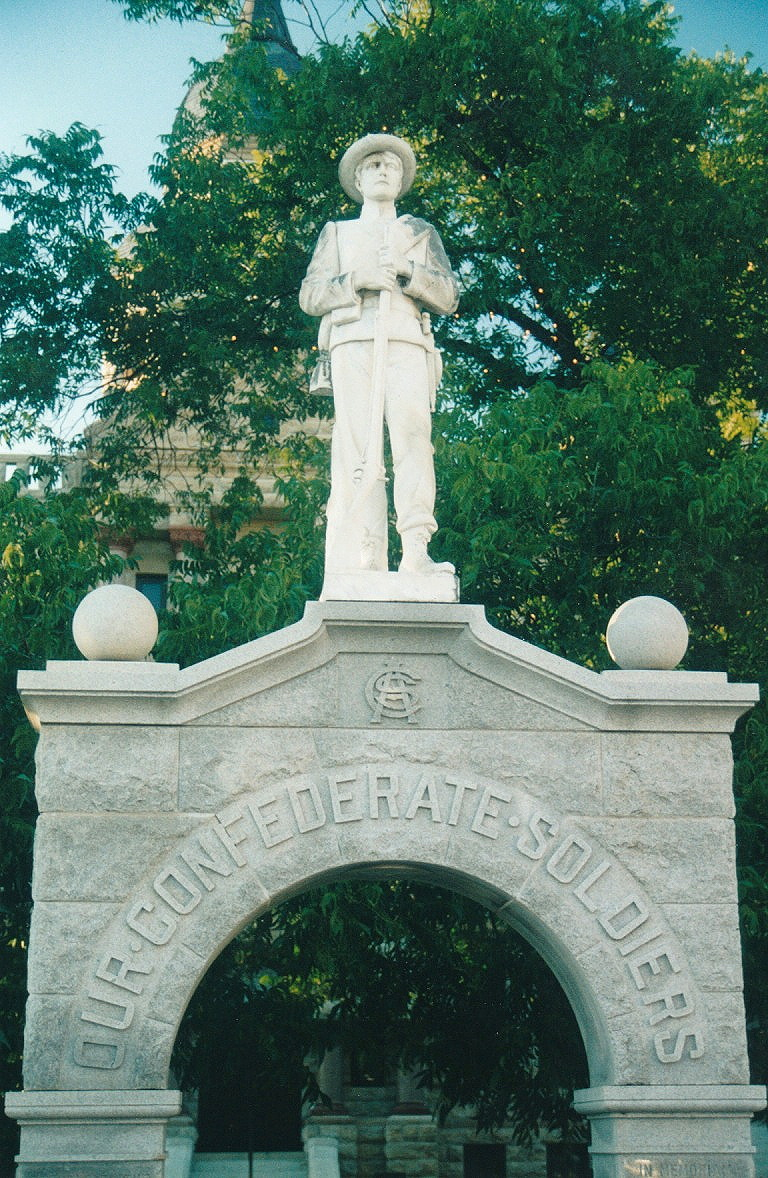
Denton, Texas

- Denton: Denton Confederate Soldier Monument, Denton County Courthouse. Cost $2,000; a project of the Denton Chapter, UDC. Dedicated June 3, 1918, Jefferson Davis's birthday. It had "whites only" drinking fountains on each side. In 2015 it was defaced with the words "THIS IS RACIST" in red paint. The twenty-year campaign of a Denton resident, Willie Hudspeth, to have the monument removed was the subject of a Vice news video in 2018. After the wave of Confederate monument removals that followed the 2017 Unite the Right rally in Charlottesville, Virginia, and in large part as a result of Hudspeth's campaign, a county 15-person Confederate Memorial Committee met for three months in 2017–18 and recommended "adding context" – two video kiosks and a large plaque, "with interviews about local veterans and the history of slavery" – to the monument rather than removing it, a suggestion accepted unanimously by the county commissioners. Once the nature of the historical context has been determined, approval of the Texas Historical Commission will be required. As of September 2018, "the county still does not have a timeline for completing the project and...there were no updates to report". The video caught the attention of Kali Holloway, director of the Make It Right Project, which is working to remove Confederate monuments. She added the Denton monument to the group's "top 10 list" of monuments they consider priorities. The statue was removed in June 2020.
- Fort Worth: Monument to "Confederate Soldiers and their Descendents" (1953), Tarrant County Courthouse

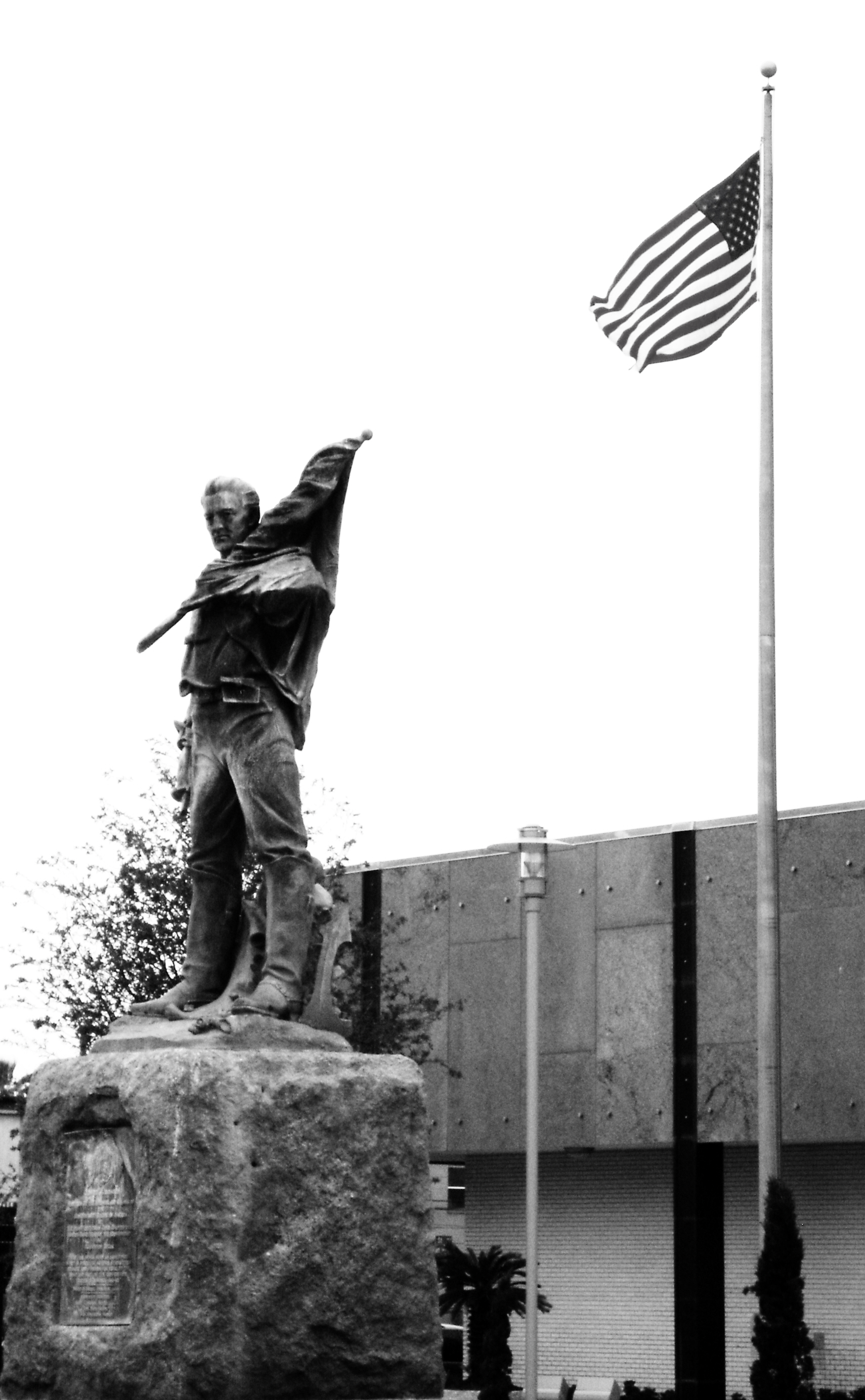
Dignified Resignation in Galveston, Texas

- Galveston: Dignified Resignation (1909) by Louis Amateis at the Galveston County Courthouse. With his back turned to the US flag while carrying a Confederate flag, it is the only memorial in Texas to feature a Confederate sailor. It was "erected to the soldiers and sailors of the Confederate States of America." An inscription on the plaque reads, "there has never been an armed force which in purity of motives intensity of courage and heroism has equaled the army and navy of the Confederate States of America."
- Gainesville: Confederate Soldiers' Monument, Cooke County Courthouse (1911)

Confederate Soldiers and Sailors Monument in Georgetown, Texas

- Georgetown: Confederate Soldiers and Sailors Monument, Williamson County Courthouse (1916)
- Goldthwaite: Confederate Soldiers' Monument, Mills County Courthouse
- Granbury: Statue of CSA General Hiram B. Granbury (1913), killed in the Battle of Franklin (1913), Hood County Courthouse. Erected by UDC.
- Hillsboro: Confederate Soldiers' Monument, Hill County, Texas Courthouse
- Jefferson: Confederate Soldiers' Monument (1907, moved to the courthouse in the 1930s), Marion County Courthouse
- Linden: Confederate Monument (1903), Cass County Courthouse
- Livingston: Confederate Soldiers' Monument, Polk County Courthouse
- Llano: Confederate Soldiers' Monument, Llano County Courthouse
- Lockhart: Confederate Soldiers' Monument, Caldwell County Courthouse
- Longview: Confederate Soldiers' Monument (1911), Gregg County Courthouse
- Mount Pleasant: Confederate Soldiers' Monument (1912), Titus County Courthouse
- Memphis: Confederate Soldiers' Monument, Hall County Courthouse
- Marshall: Confederate Soldiers' Monument (1906), Harrison County Courthouse
- New Braunfels: Confederate Soldiers' Monument (1937), Comal County Courthouse
- Paris: Confederate Soldiers' Monument, Lamar County Courthouse
- Confederate Soldiers' Monument, Kaufman, Kaufman County Courthouse
- Perryton: Courthouse monument to CSA colonel William Beck Ochiltree
- Rusk: Confederate Soldiers' Monument, Cherokee County Courthouse
- Sherman: Confederate Soldiers' Monument (1896), Grayson County Courthouse. This was the first Confederate statue dedicated at a county courthouse in Texas.
- Snyder: marker (1963) commemorating William Read Scurry, Scurry County Courthouse
- Stephenville: Confederate Soldiers' Monument (2001), Erath County Courthouse

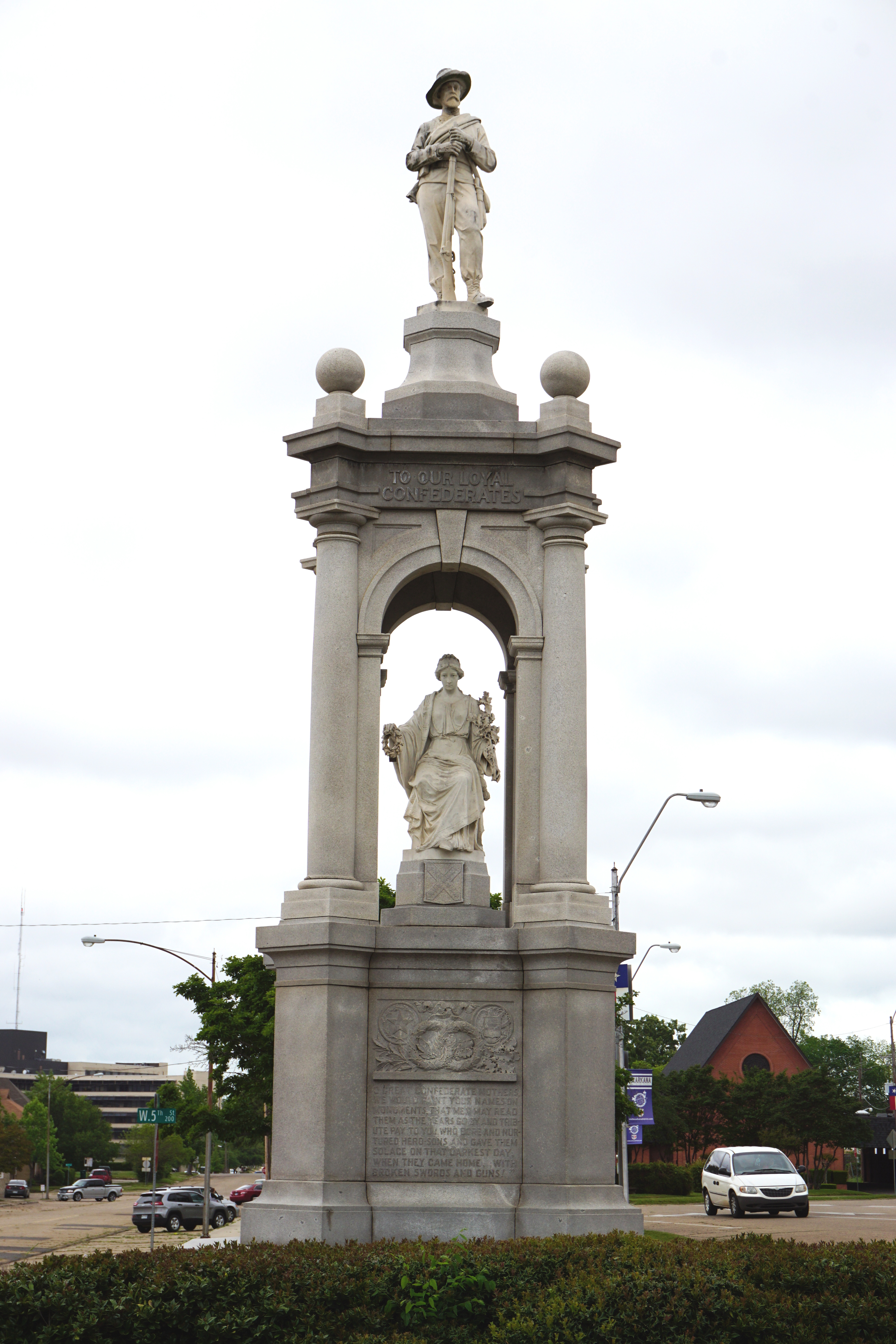
Confederate Mothers Monument in Texarkana

- Texarkana: The Confederate Mothers Monument (1918), located in Texas near the state line with Arkansas, is shared by the US District Court in Texarkana, Texas, and the US Post Office and Courthouse in Texarkana, Arkansas
- Vernon: Confederate Soldiers' Monument, Wilbarger County Courthouse
- Weatherford: Confederate Soldiers' Monument (1929), Parker County Courthouse
- Waxahachie: Confederate Soldiers' Monument (1912), Ellis County Courthouse

==== Other public monuments ====
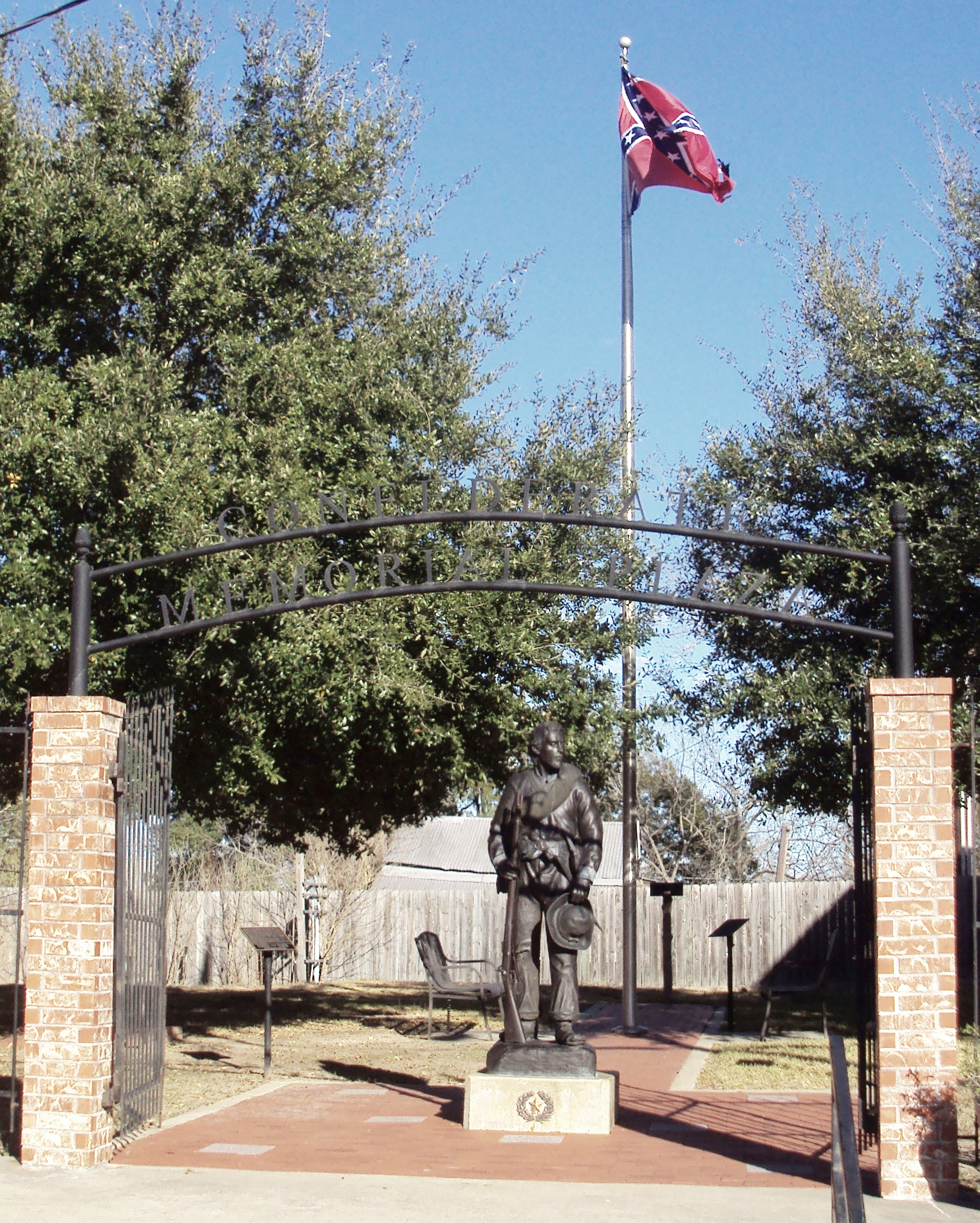
Confederate Memorial Plaza in Anderson, Texas

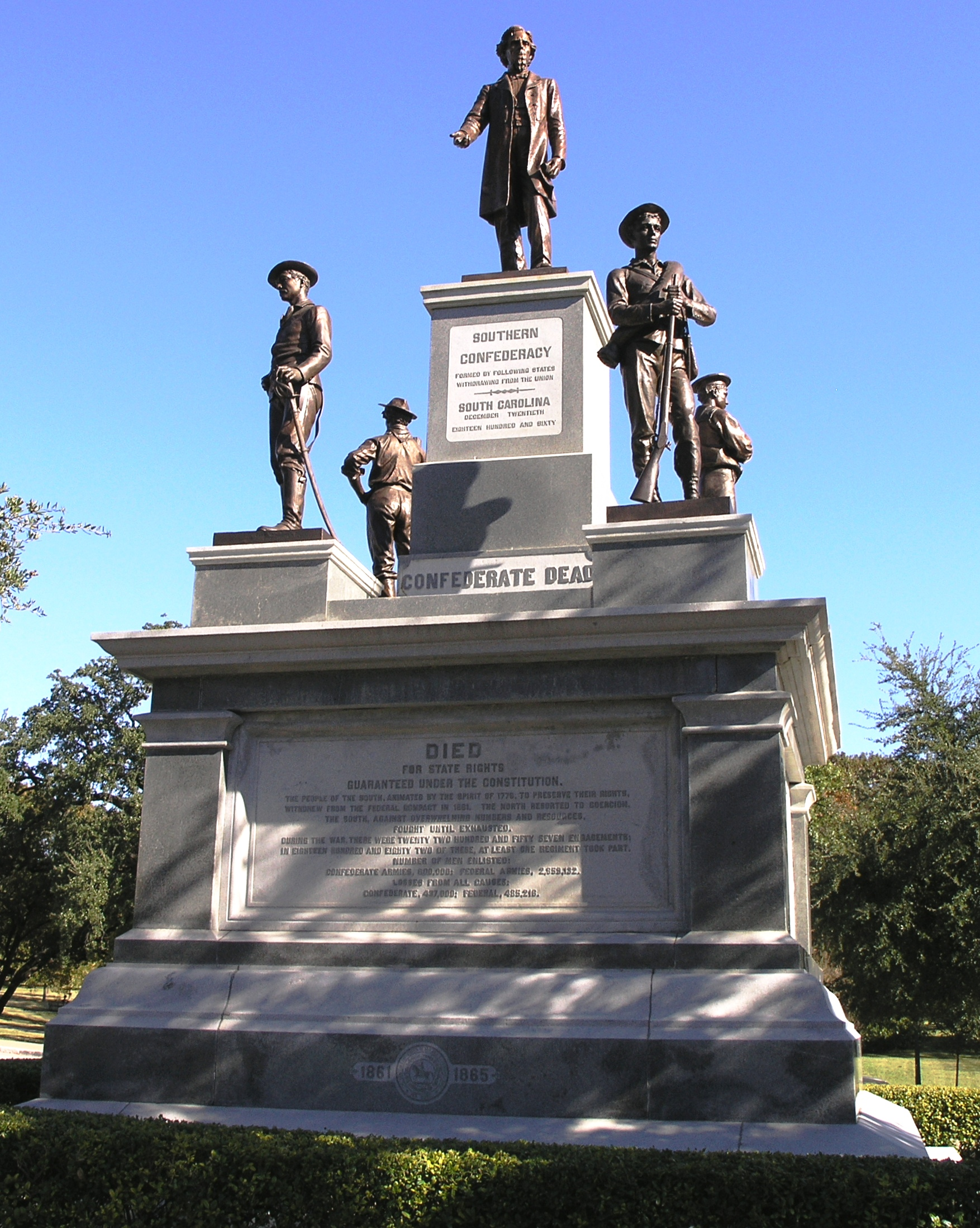
Confederate Soldiers Monument, Austin

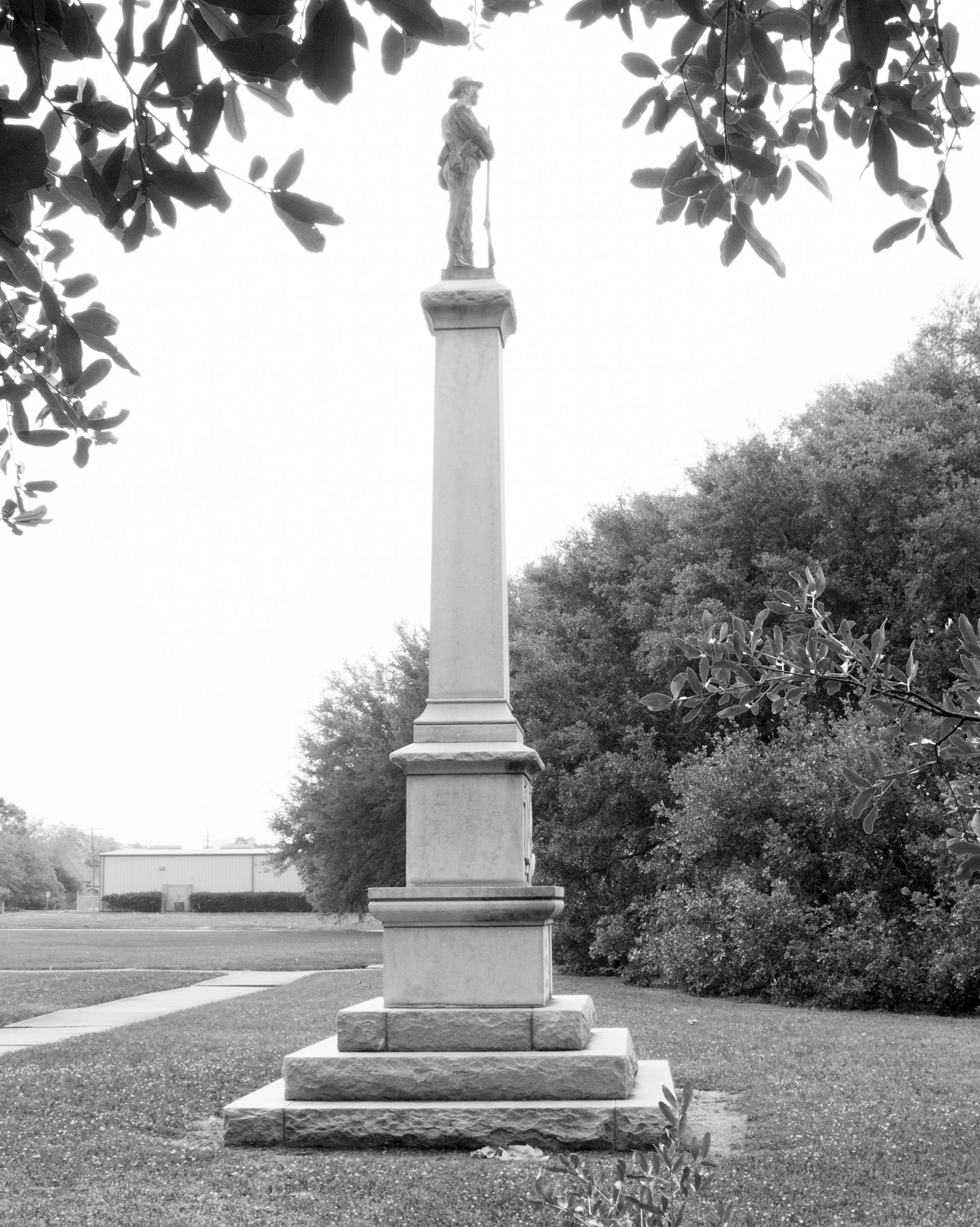
Confederate Monument, Beaumont

- Alpine: CSA Gen. Lawrence "Sul" Ross Monument (1963)
- Anderson: Confederate Memorial Plaza (2010). The plaza beside the Grimes County courthouse flies a Confederate flag behind a gate with metal lettering reading "Confederate Memorial Plaza." A metal statue depicts one of several Grimes County residents who fought with the 4th Texas volunteer infantry brigade in Virginia.
- Athens: Henderson County Confederate Monument (1964)
- Austin:
  - Hood's Texas Brigade Monument, Texas State Capitol
  - Littlefield Fountain, University of Texas, commemorates George W. Littlefield, a university regent and CSA officer. An inscription reads, "To the men and women of the Confederacy who fought with valor and suffered with fortitude that states [sic] rights be maintained."
  - Texas Confederate Women's and Men's Historical Markers, at 3710 Cedar St. and 1600 W. Sixth, commemorate campgrounds built to house and care for widows, wives, and veterans of the Confederacy.
- Beaumont: "Our Confederate Soldiers" Monument (1912). Removed in June 2020.
- Clarksville: Confederate Soldier Monument (1912)
- Cleburne: Cleburne Monument (2015) Confederate Arch (1922)
- Coleman: Hometown of Texas CSA Col. James E. McCord Monument (1963)
- College Station: A statue of Lawrence Sullivan Ross, Confederate general and former president of A&M University is located on the campus of Texas A&M University. In August 2017 the Chancellor of the university, John Sharp, confirmed that the university will not be removing the statue from the campus.
- Corpus Christi: Queen of the Sea (1914; restored 1990), bas-relief by Pompeo Coppini; UDC-sponsored Confederate memorial featuring an allegorical female figure – representing Corpus Christie – holding keys of success while receiving blessings from Mother Earth and Father Neptune, who are standing next to her. "Coppini was abhorrent of war", and in Queen of the Sea "he crafted a sculpture that symbolized peace and captured the spirit of Corpus Christi".
- El Paso:
  - Hometown of Texas CSA Capt. James W. Magoffin Monument (1964)
  - CSA Maj. Simeon Hart Monument (1964)
- Farmersville: Confederate Soldier Monument (1917), Farmersville City Park
- Fort Worth: Confederate Soldier Memorial (1939), Oakwood Cemetery
- Gainesville Confederate Heroes Statue (1908) in Leonard Park
- Gonzales: Confederate Soldiers' Monument, Confederate Square. Dedicated on June 3, 1909. To "our Confederate dead."
- Greenville: Confederate Soldier Monument (1926)
- Holliday: Stonewall Jackson Camp 249 Monument (1999)
- Houston:
  - Spirit of the Confederacy (1908, in present location since 1925), by Louis Amateis. Erected by United Daughters of the Confederacy.
  - Statue of Richard W. Dowling, located at the entrance to Hermann Park. Erected in 1905, the monument was in front of City Hall until 1958, when it was moved to its present location. In August 2017 Andrew Schneck was arrested at the statue with bomb materials.
- Kermit: Col. C.M. Winkler Monument (1963)
- Marshall:
  - Confederate Capitol of Missouri Monument (1963)
  - Confederate Monument (1906)
  - Home of Last Texas Confederate Gov. Pendleton Murrah Monument (1963)
- Miami: Col. O.M. Roberts Monument (1963)

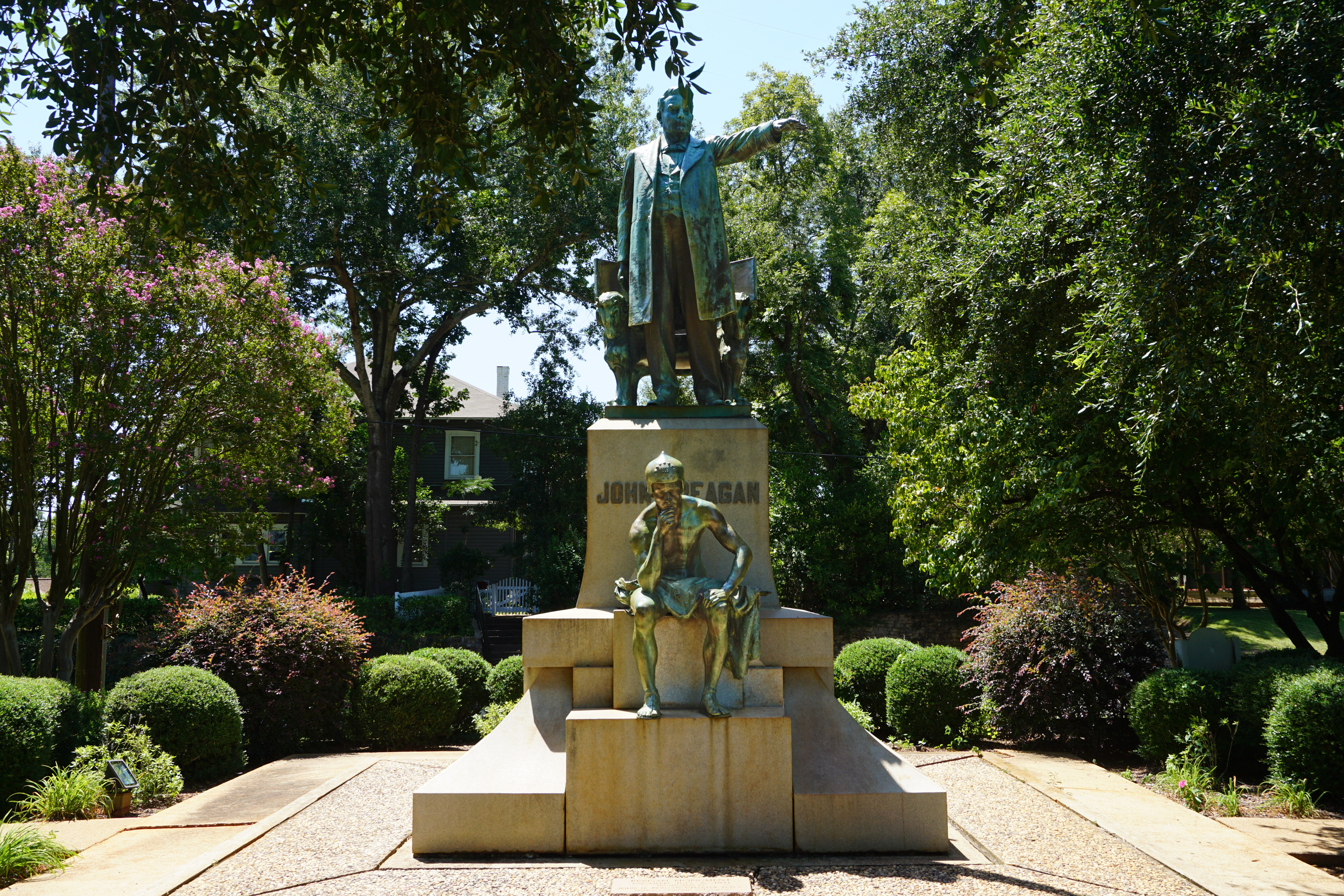
John H. Reagan Memorial in Palestine, Texas. The allegorical figure seated beneath Reagan represents the Lost Cause of the Confederacy.

- Palestine: John H. Reagan Memorial (1911) by Pompeo Coppini
- Sabine Pass: Sabine Pass Battleground State Historic Site. Where the Sabine River enters the Gulf of Mexico, 47 Confederate men held off a large Union attack, destroying two Union boats and capturing hundreds of prisoners. Today the site is managed by the Texas Historical Commission, and it hosts battle reenactments in honor of the Confederate soldiers.
- Sherman: Confederate Soldier Monument (1897)
- Tomball: Confederate Powder Mill Marker Monument (1966)
- Victoria: Confederate Monument (1912). Pompeo Coppini's statue, called The Last Stand, and sometimes The Firing Line, sits in De Leon Plaza. The inscription reads: "On civilization's height / Immutable they stand". The $5,000 cost was raised by the United Daughters of the Confederacy.

==== Private monuments ====
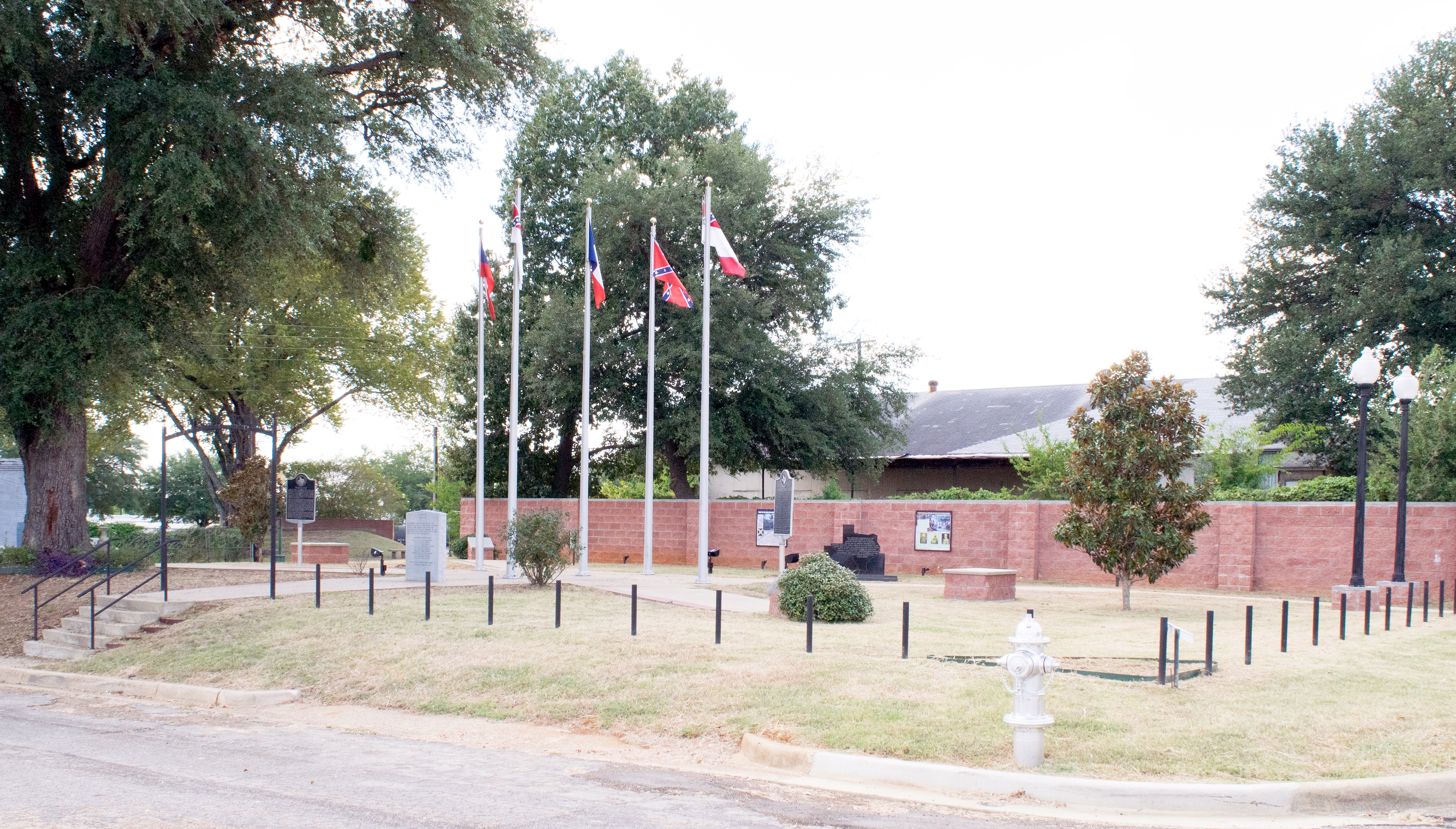
Confederate Veterans Memorial Plaza, Palestine, Texas

- Austin: Confederate monument, Oakwood Cemetery. Erected in 2016 by the Sons of Confederate Veterans.
- Belton: Monument to Confederate Sargeant Jacob Hemphill. Erected 2016 by Sons of Confederate Veterans.
- Crowley: "Confederate Veterans Memorial Monument honoring The Confederate Veterans of Crowley and the surrounding area interred at the Crowley Cemetery." Erected 2011 by the Sons of Confederate Veterans.
- Hempstead: The Liendo Plantation was a center for Confederate recruiting efforts and held Union prisoners during the war. Now it holds battle reenactments and demonstrations of Civil War era Confederate life at its annual Civil War Weekend.
- Orange: The Confederate Memorial of the Wind, located on Martin Luther King Jr. Drive, but visible from I-10, has been under construction since 2013, and will be the largest Confederate monument built since 1916, according to the Sons of Confederate Veterans. A center stone ring is held aloft by 13 pillars, one for each state that seceded. There are twenty commemorative flagpoles.
- Palestine: Confederate Veterans Memorial Plaza (2013), funded by the Sons of the Confederate Veterans

=== Inhabited places ===
==== Counties ====
- Brewster County (1887) named for Henry Percy Brewster
- Culberson County (1911) named for CSA Lieutenant Colonel David B. Culberson
- Donley County (1882) named for Stockton P. Donley, a lawyer who enlisted in the Confederate Army. Just after the war in 1866, he was elected to the Supreme Court of Texas, but was removed by the Reconstruction military government.
- Ector County (1891) named for CSA General Mathew Ector, who later served as a judge.
- Foard County (1891) named for Robert L. Foard, an attorney and Confederate Major.
- Gray County (1902) named for Peter W. Gray, a lawyer and legislator who attended the 1861 Texas State Secession Convention, and voted to leave the union. Shortly after, Gray was elected to the Confederate House of Representatives.
- Gregg County (1873) named for CSA General John Gregg, who was a delegate to the Texas Secession Convention in 1861 and was elected to represent Texas in the Provisional Confederate Congress in Montgomery, Alabama, and later in Richmond, Virginia. He was killed in action at the Siege of Petersburg in 1864.
- Hemphill County and Hemphill city (1877) named for John Hemphill, Chief Justice of the Texas Supreme Court from 1841 to 1858 until he was elected to the US Senate when Sam Houston refused to support secession. He was expelled from the Senate when Texas seceded in 1861 and then represented Texas in the Provisional Confederate Congress.
- Hood County (1866) named for CSA General John Bell Hood
- Jeff Davis County (1887) named for Jefferson Davis.
- Lee County (1874) named for Robert E. Lee.
- Lubbock County named for CSA colonel Thomas Saltus Lubbock
- Madison County: In 2020 County Commissioners designated April as Confederate History and Heritage Month.
- McCulloch County, for CSA general Benjamin McCulloch
- Ochiltree County (1889) named for secessionist politician William Beck Ochiltree.
- Oldham County (1881) named for William Simpson Oldham Sr., a Confederate politician.
- Randall County (1889) named for CSA Brig. Gen. Horace Randal.
- Reagan County (1903) named for CSA Postmaster General John H. Reagan.
- Reeves County (1884) named for CSA officer George R. Reeves.
- Roberts County (1889) named for Oran Milo Roberts, who was unanimously elected president of the 1861 Secession Convention, a meeting that he had been influential in calling. In 1862 he resigned the Supreme Court seat and was elected colonel of the Eleventh Texas infantry in the Confederate Army. He was Governor of Texas from 1879 to 1883.
- Scurry County (1884) named for secessionist and CSA Gen. William Read Scurry.
- Starr County Confederate official James Harper Starr
- Stephens County, originally Buchanan County, for U.S. President James Buchanan, in 1861 was renamed for CSA Vice-President Alexander Stephens.
- Stonewall County (1888) named for CSA General Stonewall Jackson.
- Sutton County (1890) named for CSA officer John S. Sutton.
- Terrell County (1905) named for CSA acting General Alexander W. Terrell.
- Terry County (1904) named for CSA Col. Benjamin Franklin Terry .
- Tom Green County (1875) named for CSA Brig. Gen. Thomas Green, KIA (killed in action).
- Upton County (1910) named for brothers John C. and William F. Upton, both colonels in the Confederate Army.
- Val Verde County (1885) Confederate victory in the Battle of Val Verde
- Winkler County (1910) named for CSA Col. Clinton M. Winkler.

==== Municipalities ====
- City of Cleburne (1871)
- City of Fort Davis: named for Jefferson Davis.
- City of Granbury (1887)
- City of Hemphill: named for judge and Confederate politician John Hemphill (see Hemphill County as well)
- City of Lubbock, named for Thomas Saltus Lubbock, a colonel in the Confederate Army
- City of Robert Lee
- City of Stonewall: named for Stonewall Jackson.

=== Museums ===
- Columbus: Confederate Memorial Museum. Located in an unusual building, built in 1883, that formerly was the town's water tower, and in the base its Fire Station. It is a Recorded Texas Historic Landmark. Curated by UDC, which purchased the building from the town in 1926, when its water system was modernized and the unneeded tower building put up for sale. According to the UDC it holds a collection of artifacts from Civil War soldiers of Columbus and Colorado County. It is a Recorded Texas Historic Landmark, dedicated, according to UDC, to the veterans of all wars, although the museum holds only Confederate artifacts.
- White Settlement: Texas Civil War Museum, opened 2006. It is pro-Confederacy, and the UDC has permanently one of the three seats on its board. Has material from the former Texas Confederate Museum in Austin, which closed in 1988.

=== Parks ===
- Confederate Reunion Grounds State Historic Site, Limestone County, near Mexia, Texas
- Davis Mountains State Park (1938) named for the mountain range
- Davis Mountains (geographic feature in West Texas around and named for Fort Davis)
- Fort Worth: Jefferson Davis Park. -now Unity Park.
- Holliday: Stonewall Jackson Campground
- Lakeside, Tarrant County: Confederate Park. The two Confederate flags displayed on each side of the park's marker were removed by the Texas Department of Public Transportation in 2017. Marker text:
  Site of Confederate Park // Local businessman K. M. Van Zandt organized the Robert E. Lee Camp of the United Confederate Veterans in 1889. By 1900 it boasted more than 700 members. The Club received a 25-year charter to create the Confederate Park Association in 1901, then purchased 373 acres (151 ha) near this site for the "recreation, refuge and relief of Confederate soldiers" and their families. Opening events included a picnic for veterans and families on June 20, 1902, and a statewide reunion September 8–12, 1902, with 3,500 attendees. The park thrived as a center for the civil and social activities on Texas Confederate organizations. By 1924 the numbers [ sic ] of surviving veterans had greatly diminished, and the Confederate Park Association dissolved when its charter expired in 1926.
- Palestine: John H. Reagan Park

=== Roads ===
- Austin:
  - In July 2018, at approximately the same time that Robert E. Lee Road and Jeff Davis Avenue were renamed, the city's Equity Office recommended changing the names of seven more streets:
    - Littlefield Street. Commemorates George W. Littlefield, a CSA officer.
    - Tom Green Street
    - Sneed Cove, named for Richard A. Sneed, Confederate soldier and co-founder of the Ku Klux Klan.
    - Reagan Hill Drive
    - Dixie Drive
    - Plantation Road
    - Confederate Avenue
- Conroe:
  - Beauregard Drive
  - Jubal Early Lane
  - Stonewall Jackson Drive
- El Paso: Robert E. Lee Road – now Buffalo Soldier Road
- Hamilton: Stonewall Jackson Road
- Hillsboro: Confederate Drive
- Hemphill:
  - Confederate Street
  - Stonewall Street
- Holliday: Stonewall Road
- Houston:
  - Robert E. Lee Road – now Unison Road.
  - Robert Lee Road
  - Sul Ross St, Named for Lawrence Sullivan Ross, Confederate general and former president of Texas A&M University.
  - Tuam Street, a major artery named for CSA Gen. Dowling's birthplace, Tuam, Ireland.
- Hunt: Robert E. Lee Road
- Jacksonville: Jeff Davis Street
- Kermit East Winkler Street
- Lakeside Confederate Park Road
- League City: Jeb Stuart Drive
- Levelland: Robert Lee Street
- Liberty: Confederate Street
- Livingston: Robert E. Lee Road
- Marshall:
  - Jeff Davis Street
  - Stonewall Drive
- Missouri City
  - Beauregard Court
  - Bedford Forrest Drive
  - Breckinridge Court
  - Confederate Drive
  - Pickett Place
- Richmond:
  - Jeb Stuart Drive
  - Jeff Davis Drive
  - Stonewall Drive
- Ridgley: Bedford Forrest Lane
- Roma: Robert Lee Avenue
- San Antonio:
  - Beauregard Street
  - Robert E. Lee Drive
- Sterling City: Robert Lee Highway
- Sweetwater: Robert Lee Street
- Tyler:
  - Jeb Stuart Drive
  - Jeff Davis Drive
- Victoria: Robert E. Lee Road

Note: "There are similarly named streets in towns and cities across east Texas, notably Port Arthur and Beaumont, as well as memorials to Dowling and the Davis Guards, not least at Sabine Pass, where the battleground is now preserved as a state park"

=== Schools ===
- Abilene:
  - Jackson Elementary School – now Dr. Jose Alcorta Sr. Elementary School.
  - Johnston Elementary School – now Eugene Purcell Elementary School.
  - Lee Elementary School (1961) -now Robert and Sammye Stafford Elementary School.
- Amarillo:
  - Lee Elementary School (was renamed Park Hills Elementary School in 2019)
  - Tascosa High School. Confederacy iconography was dropped in 1974. The school dropped its mascot, Johnny Reb, and stopped playing "Dixie" as their fight song. The Dixieland Singers became the Freedom Singers. Miss Southern Belle became Tascosa Belle. The "Rebel" nickname remained, but other ties to the Civil War disappeared.
- Austin:
  - John H. Reagan Early College High School (1965) – now Northeast Early College High School.
  - William B. Travis High School, home of the "Rebels". Dropped "Dixie" as its song in 2012.
  - Zachary Taylor Fulmore Middle School – now Sarah Beth Lively Middle School.
  - Sidney Lanier High School: Sidney Lanier, poet of the Confederacy, was a private in the Confederate Army. -now Juan Navarro High School.
  - Johnston High School: Named for Albert Sidney Johnston, Confederate general killed in the Battle of Shiloh. The school closed in 2008; Eastside Memorial High School is now (2017) at that location.
- Bryan:
  - Sul Ross Elementary School: Named for Lawrence Sullivan Ross, Confederate general and former president of Texas A&M University.
- Buda:
  - Jack C. Hays High School. The school uses the "Rebel" nickname for its athletic teams. Mascot "Colonel Jack" no longer has a Confederate flag belt buckle but still dresses in grey. The school dropped the Confederate flag as an official symbol in 2010 and the school district banned it from all district property in 2012. In 2015 it replaced the school song "Dixie".
- Baytown:
  - Lee College (1934) Lee College dropped “Rebels” as their nickname/mascot, and rebranded as “Navigators” in 2022.
  - Lee High School (1928)

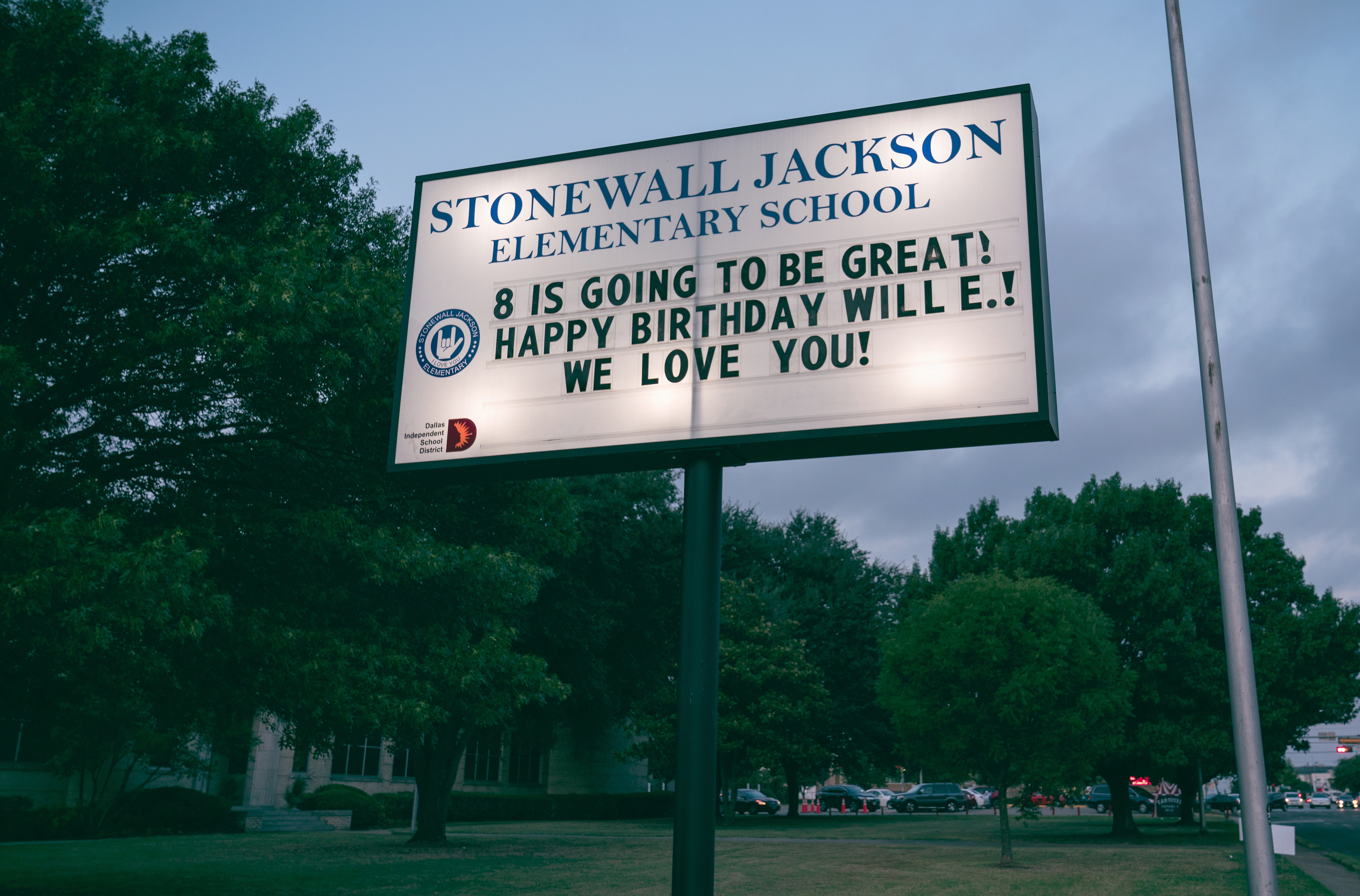
Stonewall Jackson Elementary School, Dallas

- Dallas:
  - Albert Sidney Johnston Elementary School – now Cedar Crest Elementary School.
  - John H. Reagan Elementary School – now Bishop Arts STEAM Academy.
  - Robert E. Lee Elementary School – now Geneva Heights Elementary School.
  - Stonewall Jackson Elementary School (1939) – now Mockingbird Elementary School.
  - Sidney Lanier Expressive Arts Vanguard Elementary School – now Jesús Moroles Expressive Arts Vanguard Elementary School.
- Denton: Lee Elementary School (1988), renamed Alice Moore Alexander Elementary School in 2017
- Eagle Pass: Robert E. Lee Elementary School – now Juan N. Seguin Elementary School.
- Edinburg: Lee Elementary School
- El Paso: Lee Elementary School -now Sunrise Mountain Elementary School.
- Evadale: Evadale High School. The school uses a Confederate flag-inspired crest. Its athletic teams are nicknamed the "Rebels".
- Fort Davis:
  - Fort Davis AEC School
  - Fort Davis High School
- Gainesville: Robert E. Lee Intermediate School – now Gainesville Intermediate School.
- Grand Prairie: Robert E. Lee Elementary School (1948) -now Delmas F. Morton Elementary School.
- Houston:
  - Davis High School (1926). In 2016, the Houston school board voted to rename the school. -now Northside High School.
  - Dowling Middle School (1968), named for CSA Maj. Richard W. Dowling. In 2016, the Houston school board voted to rename the school. -now Audrey H. Lawson Middle School.
  - Thomas "Stonewall" Jackson Middle School to Yolanda Black Navarro Middle School of Excellence.
  - Sydney Lanier, Confederate poet and soldier. In 2016, the Houston school board voted to rename the school. -now Bob Lanier Middle School.
  - Lee High School to Margaret Long Wisdom High School.
  - John H. Reagan High School (1926). In 2016, the Houston school board voted to rename the school. -now Heights High School.
  - Johnston Middle School (1959), named for Albert Sidney Johnston. In 2016, the Houston school board voted to rename the school. -now Meyerland Performing and Visual Arts Middle School.
- Marshall: Robert E. Lee Elementary School – closed in 2018.
- Midland:
  - Lee Freshman High School (1961) – now Midland Freshman High School.
  - Lee High School (1961). The school's athletic teams are nicknamed the "Rebels". Lee High School had used the Confederate flag in the past. -now Legacy High School.
- North Richland Hills, home of the Richland High School "Rebels" and "Dixie Belles". The school mascot is "Johnny Rebel".
- Port Arthur: Lee Elementary School (1959)-now Lakeview Elementary School.
- Robert Lee:
  - Robert Lee Elementary School
  - Robert Lee High School
- Rosenberg: B. F. Terry High School. Named for Confederate hero Benjamin Franklin Terry.
- San Angelo: Lee Middle School (1949)-now Lone Star Middle School.
- San Antonio: Robert E. Lee High School (1958). After voting against a name change in 2015, the school board voted in August 2017 to change the name of the school. In October, district trustees voted 5-2 to name the school Legacy of Educational Excellence, or LEE High School. Its mascot is currently the Volunteer and the school colors are red and grey. Its pep squad, currently called the Southern Belles, were once called the Confederates. Its varsity dance team and junior varsity drill team are respectively named the Rebel Rousers and Dixie Drillers.
- Stonewall: Stonewall Elementary School
- Tyler:
  - Hubbard Middle School (1964), named for Confederate Col. Richard B. Hubbard
  - Robert E. Lee High School (1958). Called "the city's most radioactive Confederate symbol," the possible renaming of the school was the subject of active discussion at meetings in August and September 2017. In 1970, as a result of a statewide federal desegregation order, the school had to get rid of "its Confederate-themed mascot (the Rebels), fight song ("Dixie"), and prized Confederate flag (so large that it required twenty boys to carry). Its beloved Rebel Guard, a squadron of boys handpicked by an American-history teacher to dress in replica Confederate uniforms at football games and fire a cannon named Ole Spirit after touchdowns, had to find a new name. Same for the Rebelettes drill team." -now Tyler Legacy High School.

=== Other memorials ===
- Granbury: The city holds an annual General Granbury's Birthday Bash dedicated to Confederate General Hiram B. Granbury

== Utah ==
- Dixie, a region of Washington County, Utah; The first president of the Washington Stake was Robert Dockery Covington, a slave owner from North Carolina and Mississippi. There were other Southern settlers; crops such as tobacco and cotton would grow there.
- Dixie National Forest
- Dixie State University, The former name of Utah Tech University St. George, Utah.
- Large word "DIXIE" painted on sandstone cliffs nearby, painted yearly by Dixie High School. St. George Utah
- Dixie Technical College

== Virginia ==
As of 24 June 2020, there were at least 241 public spaces with Confederate monuments in Virginia, more than in any other state. Virginia also has numerous schools, highways, roads and other public infrastructure named for Confederates. Some have been removed since. Lee-Jackson Day ceased to be a State holiday in 2020.

== Washington State ==
As of 24 June 2020, only one public space contains a Confederate connected monument in Washington.

- Bellingham: Pickett House, listed on the National Register of Historic Places.

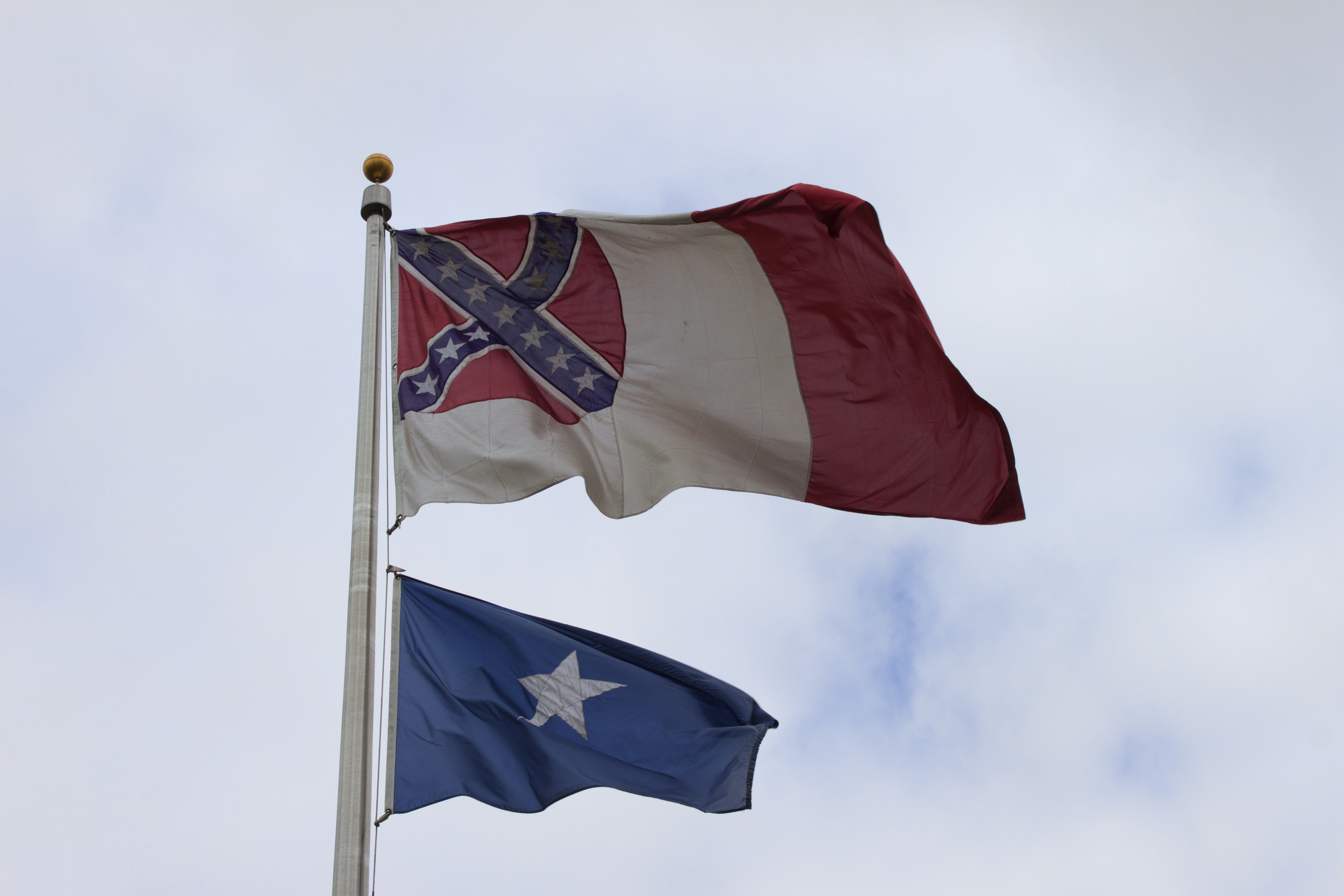
3rd Flag of the Confederacy and the Bonnie Blue Flag at the Jefferson Davis Park, 2018

At least one private property contains a Confederate memorial or flies a CSA flag:

- Clark County: Near Ridgefield is Jefferson Davis Park (2007), established by the SCV to hold the Jeff Davis Highway markers from Blaine and Vancouver. Flags of the Confederacy are also displayed there.

The United Confederate Veterans Memorial in Lake View Cemetery, Seattle, was toppled in 2020 after years of calls to remove the monument and repeated vanadalism. As of September 2020, the cemetery had no plans to restore the monument.

== West Virginia ==
As of 2020 there were 21 public spaces with Confederate monuments in West Virginia.

=== State capitol ===
- Bust of Stonewall Jackson (born in West Virginia, at that time part of Virginia) by Bryant Baker, located "in the rotunda of the West Virginia State Capitol." (1959)
- Statue of Stonewall Jackson by Moses Ezekiel on the State Capitol grounds (1910) placed by UDC Chapter No. 151

=== Monuments ===
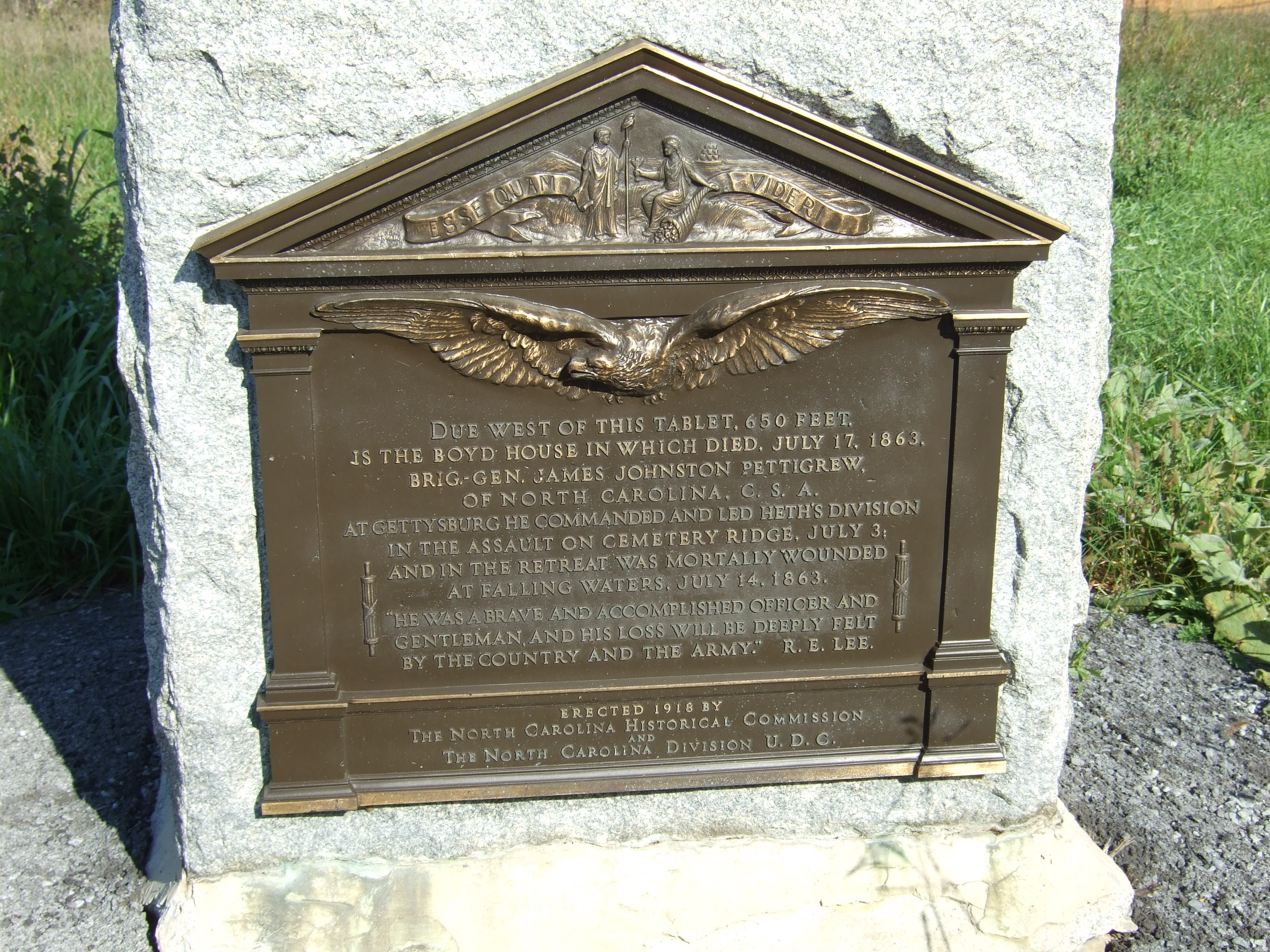
Bronze plaque commemorating the site of Pettigrew's death.

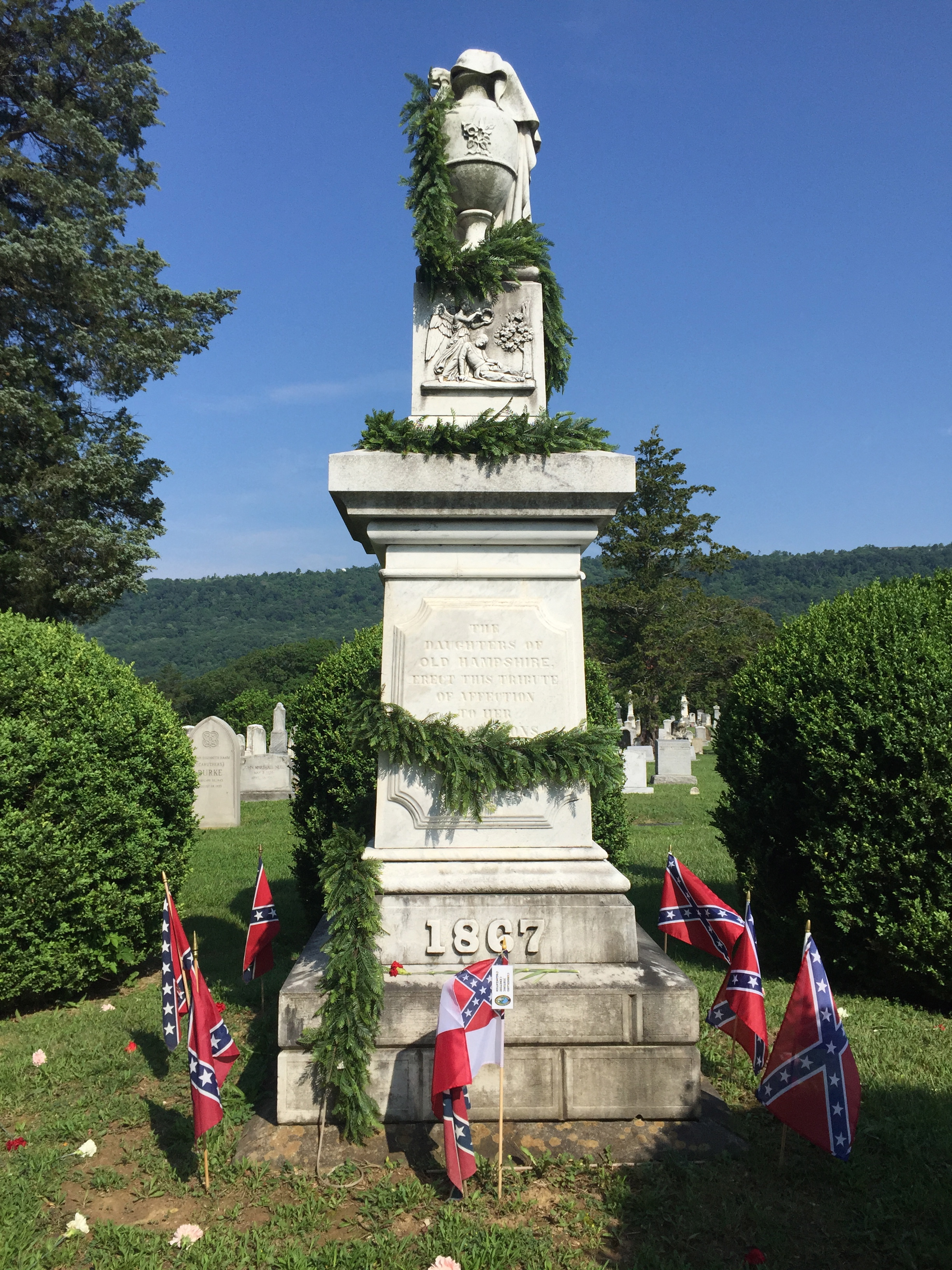
First Confederate Memorial (1867), Romney, West Virginia

- Bunker Hill, West Virginia: Monument marking the death of Brig.-Gen. James Johnston Pettigrew, wounded on July 14, 1863, near Falling Waters during the retreat after the Battle of Gettysburg. He died at Edgewood on July 17, 1863.
- Clarksburg: Bronze equestrian statue of Stonewall Jackson created by Charles Keck (1953) by the United Daughters of the Confederacy (UDC). Jackson was born in Clarksburg.
- Charles Town: Portraits of Lee and Jackson hang in the courtroom in which John Brown was tried and sentenced to death.
- Charleston – See West Virginia State Capitol, above.
- Harpers Ferry: Heyward Shepherd Monument (1931). Although Shepherd was a black freeman working for the railway when killed in John Brown's raid on Harper's Ferry, the monument was erected by UDC and Sons of Confederate Veterans (SCV). They called the project the "Faithful Slave Memorial" for many years and saw it as a way to emphasize their idea that blacks enjoyed being slaves and that men like Shepherd were victims of those seeking to free slaves.
- Hinton: Confederate Soldier Monument, Summers County Courthouse (dedicated May 1914) The base of the monument carries the inscription: "(North base:) This monument erected in honor of American valor as displayed by the Confederate soldiers from 1861 to 1865, and to perpetuate to remotest ages the patriotism and fidelity to principles of the heroes who fought and died for a lost cause. (East base:) sacred to the memory of the noble women of the Confederacy, who suffered more and lost as much, with less glory, than the Confederate soldier. (South base:) erected in the year 1914 by Camp Allen Woodrm Confederate veterans and Camp Bob Christian sons of Confederacy veterans and their friends. (West base:) This monument is dedicated to the Confederate soldiers of Greenbrier and New River valleys who followed Lee and Jackson.
- Lewisburg: Confederate Monument (1906) The Confederate "monument was erected by the United Daughters of the Confederacy at a cost of $2,800. The monument was originally located on the campus of the Greenbrier College, but moved to its present location when U.S. Route 60 was relocated." It is now located on the lawn of the old public library in Lewisburg. Some residents have suggested interpretive signage for the statue. The inscription on the base reads, "In memory of our Confederate dead."
- Mingo: Confederate Soldier Monument (1913/2013) The inscription reads in part, "TO THE MEMORY OF THE CONFEDERATE SOLDIERS OF RANDOLPH COUNTY AND VICINITY THIS INCLUDES ALL SOLDIERS WHO DIED IN VALLEY MOUNTAIN"
- Parkersburg: Confederate Soldier Monument, (1908) The monument was created by Leon Hermant and the inscription reads in part, " IN MEMORY OF OUR CONFEDERATE DEAD ERECTED BY PARKERSBURG CHAPTER UNITED DAUGHTERS OF CONFEDERACY"
- Romney: First Confederate Memorial (1867) Carved on the main facade are the words, "The daughters of Old Hampshire erect this tribute of affection to her heroic sons who fell in defense of Southern Rights."
- Union: Monroe County Confederate Soldier Monument (1901); marble statue inscribed "There is a true glory and a true honor. The glory of duty done, the honor of integrity of principle. R. E. Lee"

=== Inhabited places ===
- Bartow, initially an 1861 Confederate encampment, Camp Bartow, named for the late Confederate Colonel Francis Bartow.
- Harding, named for CSA Maj. French Harding.
- Hotchkiss, named for Stonewall Jackson's map maker Jedediah Hotchkiss
- Linden, named for CSA Capt. Charles Linden Broadus.
- Thurmond, named for CSA Captain W. D. Thurmond
- Welch, named for CSA Capt. Isaiah A. Welch.

=== Parks and water features ===
- Weston: Stonewall Jackson Lake State Park (1990) named for Stonewall Jackson Lake named for Confederate General Stonewall Jackson.

=== Roads ===
- Charles Town:
  - Beauregard Boulevard
  - Lee Way
- Charleston:
  - Beauregard Street
  - Jackson Street
  - Lee Street
  - Dixie Street
- Craigsville: General Lee Street
- Elkins: Robert E. Lee Avenue
- Flatwoods: Stonewall Jackson Highway
- Inwood: Jubal Early Avenue
- Philippi: Porterfield Road

=== Schools ===
- Charleston: Stonewall Jackson Middle School occupies the building that housed the former Stonewall Jackson High School.
  - The name was changed to West Side Middle School in July 2020.

== Wisconsin ==
- Prairie du Chien: United Daughters of the Confederacy (UDC) monument to Jefferson Davis at Fort Crawford Cemetery Soldiers' Lot. Davis served briefly at Fort Crawford. The text on the plaque reads, "JEFFERSON DAVIS, 1808–1889, Lieutenant United States Army, Assigned Fort Crawford 1831, Served here with distinction during Black Hawk War, Hero in Mexican War 1846–1848, United States Congressman, Senator, Secretary of War, President Confederate States of America, 1861–1865, Erected by The United Daughters of the Confederacy"
- Wisconsin Dells: The Confederate spy Belle Boyd (1844–1900) is buried in Spring Grove Cemetery in Wisconsin Dells. She would go on tour in the United States and speak about being a spy for the Confederacy. She also wrote a book about her career. She was to speak at a Grand Army of the Republic (GAR) Post in Kilbourne City (now Wisconsin Dells) when she died from a heart attack. Members of the local GAR served as pallbearers at her funeral and was buried at the cemetery. Her grave is marked with a Confederate flag.

== Wyoming ==
=== Natural features ===
- Yellowstone National Park: The Lamar River (named 1884–85) is named for L.Q.C. Lamar, a secessionist who drafted the instrument of Mississippi's secession and raised a regiment for the Confederates with his own money. He served as a Confederate ambassador to Russia. The river was named while he served as the United States Secretary of the Interior after the war. The Lamar Valley and other park features or administrative names which contain Lamar are derived from this original naming.

== International ==
=== Brazil ===
- In 1865, at the end of the American Civil War, a substantial number of Southerners left the South; many moved to other parts of the United States, such as the American West, but a few left the country entirely. The most popular country of Southerners emigration was Brazil, which still allowed slavery and wanted to encourage cotton production. These emigrants were known as Confederados. A Confederate monument was erected in the city of Americana, São Paulo state, Brazil.

=== Canada ===
- Kitchener, Ontario: Eastwood Collegiate Institute (1956), a public high school, replaced its Johnny Rebel mascot and Confederate imagery, perceived as associated with white bigotry, with Rebel Lion in 1999. The school retains the Rebel name for its teams.

=== Ireland ===
- Tuam: Ireland commemorated CSA Major Richard W. Dowling, who was born in the Tuam, with a bronze memorial plaque on the Town Hall bearing his image and life story. Text of plaque: "Major Richard W. (Dick) Dowling C.S.A., 1837–1867 Born Knock, Tuam; Settled Houston Texas, 1857; Outstanding business and civic leader; Joined Irish Davis Guards in American Civil War; With 47 men foiled Invasion of Texas by 5000 federal troops at Sabine Pass, 8 Sept 1863, a feat of superb gunnery; formed first oil company in Texas; Died aged 30 of yellow fever. This plaque was unveiled by Col. J.B. Collerain 31 May 1998"

=== Scotland ===
- Edinburgh: Dean Cemetery, obelisk for Scottish-born CSA Colonel Robert A. Smith, with a Confederate marker and Confederate flags.

== See also ==
- Commemoration of the American Civil War on postage stamps
- Confederate holidays
- List of Civil War Discovery Trail sites
- List of memorials and monuments at Arlington National Cemetery
- List of memorials to Jefferson Davis
- List of memorials to Robert E. Lee
- List of memorials to Stonewall Jackson
- List of memorials to the Grand Army of the Republic
- List of monuments and memorials removed during the George Floyd protests
- List of monuments erected by the United Daughters of the Confederacy
- List of monuments of the Gettysburg Battlefield
- List of monuments to African Americans
- List of Union Civil War monuments and memorials
- List of U.S. counties named after prominent Confederate historical figures
- Monument and memorial controversies in the United States
- Robert E. Lee Elementary School (disambiguation)
- Removal of Confederate monuments and memorials
- Modern display of the Confederate battle flag
