= Confederate artworks in the United States Capitol =

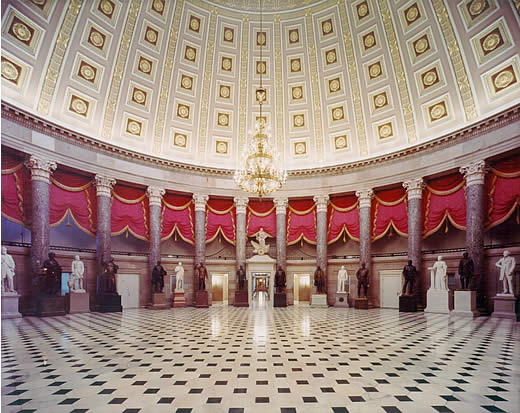
There are six Confederate figures in the National Statuary Hall Collection, in the United States Capitol.

There are several works of art in the United States Capitol honoring former leaders of the Confederate States of America and generals in the Confederate States Army, including six statues in the National Statuary Hall Collection, busts and portraits.

These include the President of the Confederacy, Jefferson Davis, the Vice President, Alexander H. Stephens, and former U.S. President John Tyler, who sided with the Confederate cause and negotiated the terms for Virginia's entry into the Confederate States of America.

== National Statuary Hall Collection ==
In the National Statuary Hall Collection, housed inside the United States Capitol, each state has provided statues of two citizens that the state wants to honor. Six Confederate figures are among them as of September 2024. The dates listed below reflect when each statue was given to the collection:

- Zebulon Baird Vance (North Carolina, 1916)
- Joseph Wheeler (Alabama, 1925)
- Alexander Hamilton Stephens (Georgia, 1927)
- Wade Hampton III (South Carolina, 1929)
- Jefferson Davis (Mississippi, 1931)
- James Zachariah George (Mississippi, 1931)

== Other art representing Confederates in the Capitol ==
- Howell Cobb (painting purchased by Congress, 1912) Cobb was a five-term member of the House of Representatives and Speaker of the House from 1849 to 1851. He was one of the founders of the Confederacy, was elected President of the Provisional Congress of the Confederate States, and later served as a major general in the CSA. He suggested the creation of Andersonville prison.
- Charles Frederick Crisp (portrait purchased 1893) During the Civil War, Crisp served in the 10th Virginia Infantry as a lieutenant. Later he was elected to Congress and served as both leader of the Democratic Party and Speaker of the House.
- John Tyler (bust purchased by Congress, 1898) Former U.S. President Tyler headed the committee that negotiated the terms for Virginia's entry into the Confederate States, signed Virginia's Ordinance of Secession on June 14, 1861. Tyler was seated in the Confederate Congress on August 1, 1861, and he served until just before his death in 1862.

== Removals ==
The statue of Jabez Lamar Monroe Curry (Alabama, 1908) was replaced by a statue of Helen Keller in 2009.

On June 18, 2020, Speaker of the House Nancy Pelosi ordered four paintings of former Confederates removed from the Speaker's Gallery in the Capitol in the wake of the nationwide protests over the murder of George Floyd while in police custody. "We didn't know about this until we were taking inventory of the statues and the curator told us that there were four paintings of Speakers in the Capitol of the United States, four Speakers who had served in the Confederacy," Pelosi told reporters in the Capitol.

The statue of Robert E. Lee (Virginia, 1909) was removed on December 21, 2020. In January 2023, the design of a replacement statue of Barbara Rose Johns was revealed. At the time, sculptor Steven Weitzman stated that the statue would be ready for installation sometime in 2024.

The statue of Edmund Kirby Smith (Florida, 1922) was removed in 2021 and replaced by a statue of Mary McLeod Bethune in 2022.

== Unsuccessful legislation for removal ==
On July 22, 2020, in the midst of the George Floyd protests, the U.S. House of Representatives voted 305–113 to remove a bust of Chief Justice Roger B. Taney (as well as statues honoring figures who were part of the Confederacy during the Civil War) from the U.S. Capitol and replace it with a bust of Justice Thurgood Marshall. The bill called for removal of Taney's bust within 30 days after the law's passage. The bust had been mounted in the old robing room adjacent to the Old Supreme Court Chamber in the Capitol Building. The bill (H.R. 7573) also created a "process to obtain a bust of Marshall ... and place it there within a minimum of two years." After the bill reached the Republican-led Senate on 30 July 2020 (S.4382) it was referred to the Committee on Rules and Administration, but no further action on it was taken.

== See also ==
- List of artwork at the United States Capitol complex
- United States Capitol art
