= Statue of Jefferson Davis (U.S. Capitol) =

Sculpture by Henry Augustus Lukeman

Jefferson Davis
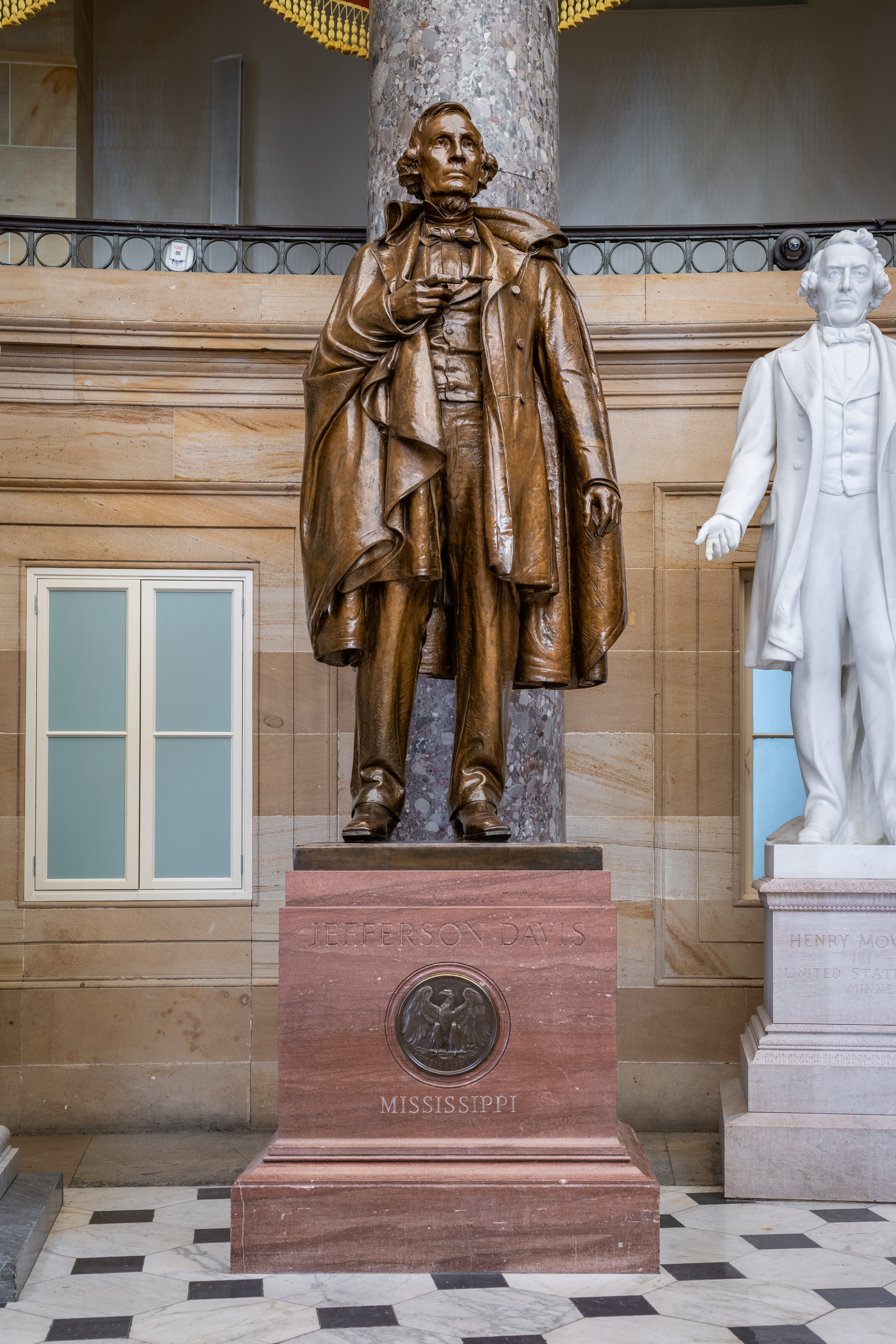
- The statue at the National Statuary Hall in 2023
- Artist: Henry Augustus Lukeman
- Medium: Bronze sculpture
- Subject: Jefferson Davis
- Location: First St SE, Washington, D.C., United States

Jefferson Davis, created by Henry Augustus Lukeman, is a bronze sculpture of Jefferson Davis – a U.S. Senator, U.S. Secretary of War, plantation owner and the only President of the Confederate States of America during the American Civil War – commissioned by the U.S. State of Mississippi for inclusion in National Statuary Hall Collection at the United States Capitol's National Statuary Hall, in Washington, D.C. The statue was controversial at the time of its unveiling and there have been multiple efforts to remove it from the Capitol since 2015.

== Background and unveiling ceremony ==
In 1864, Congress passed legislation that invited each state to contribute two statues of prominent citizens for permanent display in the former meeting hall of the U.S. House of Representatives, which was renamed National Statuary Hall. The State of Mississippi commissioned Henry Augustus Lukeman to sculpt statues of Jefferson Davis and James Z. George to be presented as Mississippi's first contributions to the National Statuary Hall's collection. Neither Davis nor George were born in Mississippi but both had moved to the state as children. Lukeman had previously contributed to the construction of Confederate memorial Stone Mountain in Georgia.

Lukeman's statues of Davis and George were presented and unveiled on June 2, 1931, in a ceremony held in Statuary Hall in the United States Capitol. Adele Hayes-Davis, Jefferson Davis's great-granddaughter, officially unveiled the statue of Jefferson Davis. The United States Marine Band performed music including "The Star-Spangled Banner" and "Dixie." Arthur Cook, a member of the office of the Architect of the Capitol who was in charge of the arrangements for the unveiling ceremony, claimed that the unveiling ceremony had the largest crowd ever gathered in Statuary Hall.

Journalist Edgar S. Wilson and U.S. Senator Pat Harrison each delivered commemorative addresses honoring Jefferson Davis. Wilson favorably compared Davis to Abraham Lincoln, the President of the United States during the American Civil War between the United States of America and the Southern Confederacy. Wilson also read a March 10, 1884, speech that Davis gave to the Mississippi Legislature in its entirety, as well as a passage from Davis's book, The Rise and Fall of the Confederate Government. In both the 1884 speech and the passage from his book, Davis was unrepentant for Secession and promoted the Confederacy as a heroic and justified Lost Cause.

Senator Harrison in his speech stated that Jefferson Davis was "entitled" to his place in Statuary Hall, "fixed in the history of a great and reunited country" alongside "his comrades – [Robert E.] Lee, [Wade] Hampton, [Joseph] Wheeler, [Alexander H] Stephens, [Edmund] Kirby Smith and James Z. George" in addition to "[Henry] Clay, [Daniel] Webster, [Lewis] Cass and [John C.] Calhoun." Harrison also addressed Mississippi's delay in placing statues in Statuary Hall:

There never has been a day since [Mississippi] received the nation's gracious invitation when the slightest doubt was entertained that her first choice among all the array of distinguished and illustrious characters to occupy a place here would be Jefferson Davis. No other name is so closely interwoven with [Mississippi's] history and so securely riveted in the affection of her people. Without apology for the part she played in that tragic drama which divided the sections and tore the nation asunder [Mississippi] has realized the sensitive character of the national situation and believed that in the passing of years the scars of strife and the wounds of conflict would heal and the time would come when the tolerant spirit of the reunited people would concede to the people of both sections a conscientious discharge of duty as they saw it under the Constitution and the principles of our government.

=== Public reaction to the statue's unveiling ===
A commemoration of Jefferson Davis's birthday in 1938

The Houston Post, in a 1930 editorial published in newspapers around the country discussing the planned installation of the statue in Statuary Hall, stated "Justice to Jefferson Davis was long delayed, but it has been coming, and the placing of this statue in the nation's Capitol along with those of other great servants of the country, will hasten the day when the great leader in the lost cause will be accorded his rightful place in the history of the country."

In the lead up to the unveiling of the Davis and George statues, The Atlanta Constitution published an editorial describing Jefferson Davis as "a chief apostle of southern sentiments and aspirations" and a "martyr and immortal" "who sacrificed splendidly." They added that the "gallant and grateful Mississippians have honored their statue and themselves by fixing [Davis's] sculptured personality among the famous of the nation," and the "ceremonies of presentation of these statues will mark one of the notable days in the country's annals."

In a response to the Davis Statue's unveiling, The Daily News published an editorial criticizing Mississippi for choosing "as her favorite son the slavery leader" Davis, "the leader of the cause which sought to split up the United States," a cause that was "based on the most barbarous cruel and vicious institution ever invented – human slavery." Commenting on the popular commemoration of Confederates, the editorial found it peculiar that "most southerners honor the men who tried to break up the Union above the southerners who played an enormous role in building the Union."

In a letter to the editor published in The Burlington Free Press, W. W. Jeffords commented on the unveiling of the Jefferson Davis statue writing that "when we stop and consider that [Jefferson Davis] was an arch-traitor and unrepentant all of his life subsequent to the close of the Civil War and refused to avail himself of the privilege of the general Amnesty Act ... it seems almost incredible that his lifeless image should have been admitted to the National Capitol."

== Later history ==
The United Daughters of the Confederacy (UDC) and other Confederate commemoration groups like the United Confederate Veterans, the Children of the Confederacy, and Sons of Confederate Veterans regularly held wreath-laying ceremonies at the Jefferson Davis statue at the U.S. Capitol in Statuary Hall to honor Jefferson Davis's June 3 birthday. Speeches were commonly given at the birthday celebration in Statuary Hall by members of the Confederate groups as well as public figures such as U.S. Representatives John Rankin (D-MS) in 1949 and Frank Ellis Smith (D-MS) in 1953. This wreath-laying ceremony at the Davis Statue was often part of larger Confederate Memorial Day celebrations.

At the 1942 wreath-laying ceremony, U.S. Representative Joseph R. Bryson (D-SC) gave a speech where he said of Jefferson Davis, "To be honored as a great man after the history of a lost cause has been written is to be truly great in the finest and most exact sense of the term." Georgetown University history professor Charles C. Tansill gave an address at the 1947 wreath-laying ceremony. In his speech, Tansill stated that "the responsibility of the Civil War rests securely upon one pair of shoulders and those shoulders belonged to Abraham Lincoln." These comments were condemned by the UDC president-general Mrs. John Wilcox who declared that Tansill's "allusions to Mr. Lincoln do not reflect our views. We think it is rather untimely that those remarks were made. We don't care to start up a controversy."

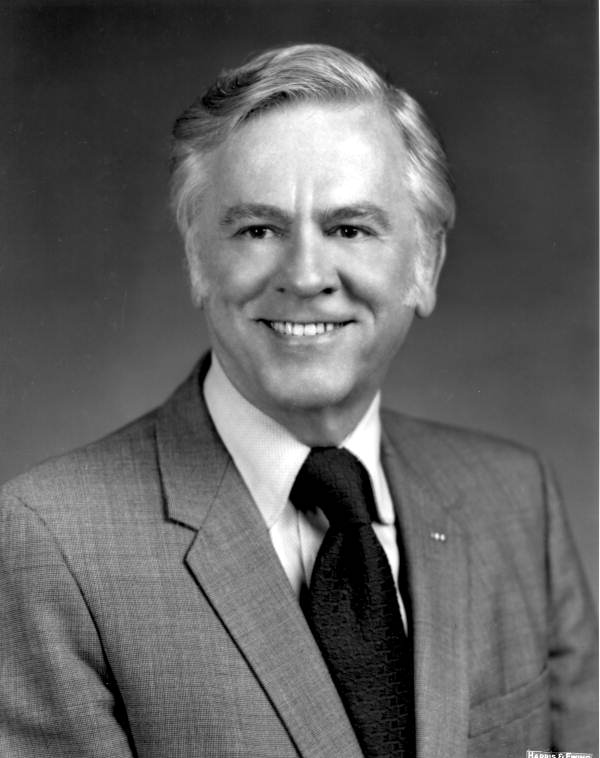
US Congressman Charles E. Bennet was one of many public figures to give a speech in the U.S. Capitol's National Statuary Hall to commemorate Jefferson Davis's June 3 Birthday

In 1954, U.S. Representative Charles E. Bennet (D-FL) spoke at the wreath-laying celebration in Statuary Hall where he characterized Jefferson Davis as "one of the finest Americans we could possibly select for consideration." He further stated that Davis was a "man of courage" and that "it takes courage today to stand out against centralized government ... and for people to insist that local governments take responsibility." The 1959 wreath-laying in Statuary Hall was preceded by the unveiling ceremony of a Jefferson Davis wax figure at the National Historic Wax Museum in Washington, D.C.

In 1978, U.S. President Jimmy Carter signed congressional legislation posthumously restoring United States citizenship to Jefferson Davis. At the signing, Carter noted that "our nation needs to clear away the guilts and enmities of recriminations of the past." The Associated Press commented that this restoration of Davis was "proper considering the statues of [Jefferson Davis], Gen. Robert E. Lee and other Confederate leaders have adorned the [U.S.] Capitol for decades" and that the "South has risen again, in a sense, in Statuary Hall."

As recently as 1997, Confederate hereditary associations placed wreaths at the statue of Davis.

== Calls for removal ==
There have been repeated calls to remove and replace the Jefferson Davis statue from the National Statuary Hall Collection. According to federal law, a statue in the National Statuary Hall Collection can be removed through a resolution from its respective state's legislature and approval from the state's governor.

=== 2015 ===
After the 2015 racially motivated mass shooting at the Emanuel African Methodist Episcopal Church in Charleston, South Carolina, there was increased attention and interest to remove Confederate symbols in the United States, including the statues representing Confederate figures in the U.S. Capitol. This extended to the Jefferson Davis statue in Statuary Hall. After there were calls for its removal, U.S. Senators Roger Wicker (R-MS) and Thad Cochran (R-MS) both defended the statue's placement in the U.S. Capitol. Wicker, referring to Davis's role in overseeing an expansion of the U.S. Capitol Building as well as Davis's overall legacy, said "Jefferson Davis is a historical figure to be studied and to be honored." Cochran, when asked about replacing the statue, said "I don't know. I don't want them taking my desk way either. That's Jefferson Davis's desk... I'm very proud to have it. The senior senator from Mississippi is given the opportunity to sit at the Davis desk."

=== 2017 ===
In March 2017, the University of Mississippi held a panel discussion, “Revisiting Jefferson Davis and J.Z. George: U.S. Capitol Relics?,” to discuss the future of the statues. William Rogers, one of the panelists and president of the Mississippi Historical Society, stated that Elvis Presley, William Faulkner, Eudora Welty, Medgar Evers or Fannie Lou Hamer would be good replacements for the Davis and George statues in the US Capitol. Mississippi Governor Phil Bryant told The Clarion-Ledger that he was willing to have "a general discussion about the Mississippi Statues [in National Statuary Hall]" and that "B.B. King and Elvis would be good possibilities for a replacement." Mississippi resident Al Price also told The Clarion-Ledger that he petitioned Mississippi State Senator Lydia Chassaniol to replace the statues, as "Jefferson Davis and James Z. George conjure images of the secession, the Civil War, slavery and the terrible legacy of Jim Crow." However, Chassaniol responded by condemning those "who refuse to recognize the efforts of the 19th-century pioneers who settled this state and carved a civilization from the wilderness" and that she "refuses to take part in revisionist history."

The aftermath of the Charlottesville Unite the Right Rally in August 2017 accelerated the removal of Confederate statues and monuments from many U.S. cities. It also sparked further interest in the statues representing Confederate figures in Statuary Hall, as well as calls for their removal from the U.S. Capitol. U.S. Representative Cedric Richmond (D-LA), chairman of the Congressional Black Caucus (CBC), stated that "the Confederate statues in the Capitol are offensive to all African-American congressmen and African Americans that visit the Capitol" and that the CBC would do "everything we can to remove them." US Representative Bennie Thompson (D-MS) similarly stated that "Confederate memorabilia have no place in this country and especially not in the United States Capitol... These images symbolize a time of racial discrimination and segregation that continues to haunt this country and many African-Americans who still to this day face racism and bigotry." Former Mississippi Governor Ray Mabus also called for the same statues to be removed, saying that "They were put up to reestablish Jim Crow . . . to reestablish white control and white supremacy and to disenfranchise African Americans." U.S. News & World Report's Eric Englert, while discussing the statues honoring Confederate leaders in Statuary Hall, singled out the Davis statue, as Davis "espoused racist beliefs" like "his 1861 justification of slavery, writing that the idea that all men are created equal is a 'theory.'" Davis's descendant, Bertram Hayes-Davis, told CNN's Don Lemon that the Davis statue in the US Capitol was "placed there for a reason" and that he thinks "you have to look at the entire individual before you make a decision whether they belong at the Capitol of the United States or not." Hayes-Davis also said that statues should be moved to a place where they can be given historical context if they are "offensive to a large majority of the public."

Legislation was introduced into both chambers of the United States Congress in September 2017 to remove all statues with ties to the Confederacy from the National Statuary Hall Collection. After it did not advance, the same legislation was reintroduced in 2020 and 2021.

== See also ==
- 1931 in art
- List of Confederate monuments and memorials
- List of memorials to Jefferson Davis
- Statue of Jefferson Davis (Austin, Texas)

== Sources ==
- Acceptance and unveiling of the statues of Jefferson Davis and James Z. George. United States Government Printing Office. 1932. OCLC 1083534883.
- "Davis Reaches Statuary Hall". Daily News. June 4, 1931. ProQuest 2277356996.
- Jeffords, W W (June 24, 1931). "Objects to Davis Statue in Capitol". The Burlington Free Press and Times. ProQuest 1952738988.
- Oulahan, Richard V. (June 3, 1931). "CONFEDERATE CHIEF HONORED IN CAPITOL". The New York Times. ProQuest 99353490.
- "The Houston Post-Dispatch 'The Davis Statue". Asbury Park Evening Press. November 12, 1930. ProQuest 2002493319.
- "The Mississippi Heroes". The Atlanta Constitution. May 31, 1931. ProQuest 501330939.
