= Jabez L. M. Curry =

American politician (1825–1903)

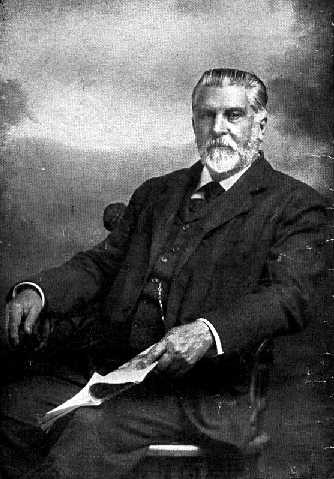
- Curry in 1901

25th United States Minister to Spain
- In office December 22, 1885 – July 5, 1888
- President: Grover Cleveland
- Preceded by: John W. Foster
- Succeeded by: Perry Belmont

3rd President of Howard College
- In office 1865–1868
- Preceded by: Henry Talbird
- Succeeded by: Edward Quinn Thornton

Member of the C.S. House of Representatives from Alabama's 4th district
- In office February 18, 1862 – February 17, 1864
- Preceded by: Constituency established
- Succeeded by: Marcus Henderson Cruikshank

Deputy from Alabama to the Provisional Congress of the Confederate States
- In office February 4, 1861 – February 17, 1862
- Preceded by: Constituency established
- Succeeded by: Constituency abolished

Member of the U.S. House of Representatives from Alabama's 7th district
- In office March 4, 1857 – January 21, 1861
- Preceded by: Sampson W. Harris
- Succeeded by: Constituency abolished

Member of the Alabama House of Representatives from Talladega County
- In office December 6, 1847 – March 4, 1857
- Preceded by: F. W. Bowdon, John Hill, Henry B. Turner, Jr.
- Succeeded by: Jno. T. Bell, J. B. Martin

Personal details
- Born: Jabez Lafayette Monroe Curry; June 5, 1825 Lincoln County, Georgia
- Died: February 12, 1903 (aged 77) Asheville, North Carolina
- Party: Democratic
- Spouse: Ann Bowie (m. 1847; died 1865)
- Children: 4
- Parent(s): William Curry; Susan Winn Curry
- Education: Franklin College; Harvard University (LL.B.)

Military service
- Allegiance: United States of America; Confederate States of America
- Branch/service: United States Army; Confederate States Army
- Years of service: 1846 (U.S.); 1861–1865 (C.S.)
- Rank: Private (Texas Rangers); Lieutenant colonel (CSA)
- Unit: Army of Northern Virginia
- Commands: 5th Alabama Regiment
- Battles/wars: Mexican–American War; American Civil War

Jabez Lamar Monroe Curry (June 5, 1825 – February 12, 1903) was an American Democratic politician from Alabama who served in the state legislature and US Congress. He also served as an officer of the Confederate States Army in the American Civil War. He was a slave owner.

After the war, he became strongly interested in education of both blacks and whites, supporting increased access. Curry taught at the university level. He was also appointed as a diplomat to Spain, serving from 1885 to 1888, and again in 1902. In 1889, he described Reconstruction as an effort to degrade the white man and give supremacy to the "negro".

== Early life ==
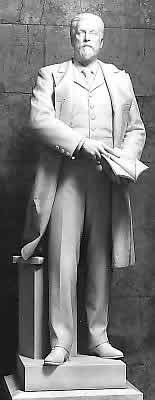
Marble sculpture by Dante Sodini (1908)

Curry was born in Lincoln County, Georgia, the son of planter William and Susan Winn Curry. His father was a cousin of Mirabeau Buonaparte Lamar, the second president of the Republic of Texas. Lamar had married Tabitha Burwell Jordan, J.L.M. Curry's aunt. Curry grew up in a slaveholding family in Alabama and graduated from the University of Georgia in 1843, where he was a member of the Phi Kappa Literary Society. While studying at Harvard Law School, Curry was inspired by the lectures of Horace Mann and became an advocate of free universal education.

=== Career ===
Curry became an attorney. An owner of slaves, he served in the military and in public life. He served in the Mexican–American War of 1848. He was elected to the Alabama State Legislature, serving in 1847, 1853, and 1855. He served two terms as a Democrat in the United States House of Representatives, from 1857 to 1861. After Alabama seceded with the outbreak of the American Civil War, Curry resigned from Congress and served in the Provisional Congress of the Confederate States.

He was commissioned as a lieutenant-colonel in the Confederate Army, where he served as a staff aide to General Joseph E. Johnston and General Joseph Wheeler.

=== Postwar career ===
After the war he studied for the ministry and became a preacher, but the focus of his work was free education in the South. He traveled and lectured in support of state normal schools, adequate rural schools, and a system of graded public schools. He was president of Howard College (now Samford University), Alabama from 1865–68. He next was a professor of history and literature at Richmond College, Virginia.

From 1881 until his death Curry was agent for the Peabody and Slater Funds to aid schools in the South. He was instrumental in the founding of both the Southern Education Board and the first normal school in Virginia, now known as Longwood University.

According to Paul H. Buck in his Pulitzer-Prize winning history of the reconciliation of North and South, Curry played a major role in promoting reunification of the sections. He told the 1896 national convention of the United Confederate Veterans that their organization was not formed, "in malice or in mischief, in disaffection, or in rebellion, nor to keep alive sectional hates, nor to awaken revenge for defeat, nor to kindle disloyalty to the Union." Rather their "recognition of the glorious deeds of our comrades is perfectly consistent with loyalty to the flag and devotion to the Constitution and the resulting Union." The convention agreed with him and formally resolved the Confederate veteran has: "returned to the Union as an equal, and he remains in the Union as a friend. With no humble apologies, no unmanly servility, no petty spite, no sullen treachery, he is a cheerful, frank citizen of the United States, accepting the present, trusting the future, and proud of the past."

Curry was appointed by President Grover Cleveland as the envoy extraordinary and minister plenipotentiary to Spain during 1885–1888, and by President Theodore Roosevelt as ambassador extraordinary to Spain on the coming of age of King Alfonso XIII in 1902.

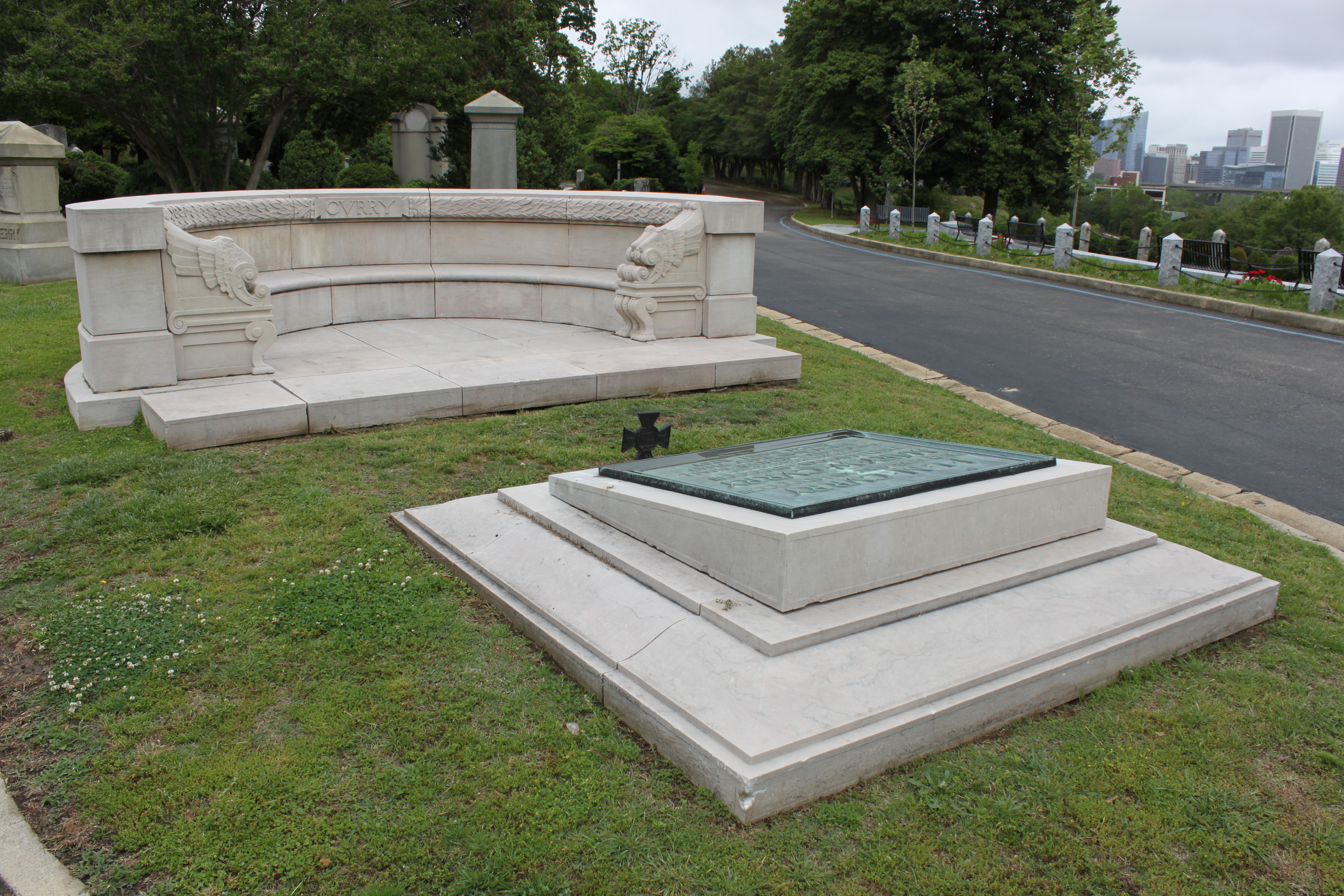
Memorial to Curry at Hollywood Cemetery in Richmond

Curry wrote on education, American government, and Spanish history.

Curry died on February 12, 1903, and is buried in Richmond, Virginia. His wife is buried in Talladega, Alabama, where they had earlier lived. Their home, the J.L.M. Curry House, also called the Curry-Burt-Smelley House, was designated as a National Historic Landmark and has been preserved.

== Legacy ==
During his life, Curry was awarded the Royal Order of Charles III and several honorary degrees.

The Curry School of Education at the University of Virginia was named for him posthumously in 1905, in accordance with a stipulation in a donation given that year by John D. Rockfeller, Sr. to fund the establishment of the school. In spring 2020, the university president supported a recommendation to remove Curry's name from the school, because of his support for slavery and the Confederate cause. This reflects a shared effort on the part of the institution and the broader Charlottesville community to mitigate the stains of racism and slavery. In September the University's board of visitors voted to remove his name from the school.

As the naming subcommittee reported, Curry's legacy is worthy of careful scrutiny. He made pro-slavery speeches from before the Civil War and held membership in the Confederate House of Representatives. His later efforts promoted education for blacks during the Reconstruction era up through the end of the 19th century are reflective of more progressive ideals that were not shared by many of his contemporaries. He did promote a more vocational style of education for blacks than he would for whites. This approach was shared by Booker T. Washington of the Tuskegee Institute, who believed that blacks should be prepared for the work most would encounter in their rural communities of the time.

Curry Hall dormitory at Longwood University and the Curry Building at the University of North Carolina at Greensboro are also named for him.

Curry was honored early in the 20th century by one of Alabama's two statues in the United States Capitol's National Statuary Hall Collection. It was sculpted by Dante Sodini in 1908, the year the state donated it to the hall. In October 2009, the state replaced the Statue of Jabez Lamar Monroe Curry with a Statue of Helen Keller of Helen Keller, activist and author. Curry's statue was transferred to Samford University, where he had been closely involved. It was displayed in Samford's university center until the building was closed for renovation in 2018. At that point the statue was returned to the Alabama Department of Archives and History.

== Works ==
- Constitutional Government in Spain (1889)
- William Ewart Gladstone (1891)
- The Southern States of the American Union (1894)
- Difficulties, Complications, and Limitations Connected with the Education of the Negro (1895)
- Civil History of the Government of the Confederate States, with some Personal Reminiscences (1901)

U.S. House of Representatives
| Preceded by Sampson W. Harris | Member of the U.S. House of Representatives from Alabama's 7th congressional district March 4, 1857 – January 21, 1861 | District inactive |
Political offices
| New constituency | Deputy from Alabama to the Provisional Congress of the Confederate States; February 4, 1861 – February 17, 1862 | Constituency abolished |
Diplomatic posts
| Preceded by John W. Foster | U.S. Minister to Spain; December 22, 1885 – July 5, 1888 | Succeeded by Perry Belmont |
