= Statue of Jabez Lamar Monroe Curry =

Statue formerly in the U.S. Capitol

Jabez Lamar Monroe Curry
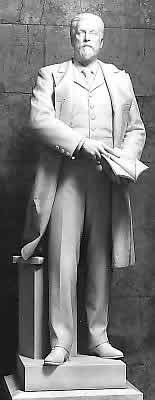
- The statue
- Artist: Dante Sodini
- Medium: Marble sculpture
- Subject: Jabez Lamar Monroe Curry
- Location: Homewood, Alabama, United States

Jabez Lamar Monroe Curry is a marble sculpture depicting the American politician and diplomat of the same name by Dante Sodini. The statue was gifted to the National Statuary Hall Collection from the state of Alabama in 1908, but was replaced by one depicting Helen Keller in 2009, and relocated to Samford University, where he had served as president from 1865 to 1868. In 2018, Samford returned the statue to the Alabama Department of Archives and History.

== See also ==
- 1908 in art
