= Berthold Nebel =

American sculptor (1889–1964)

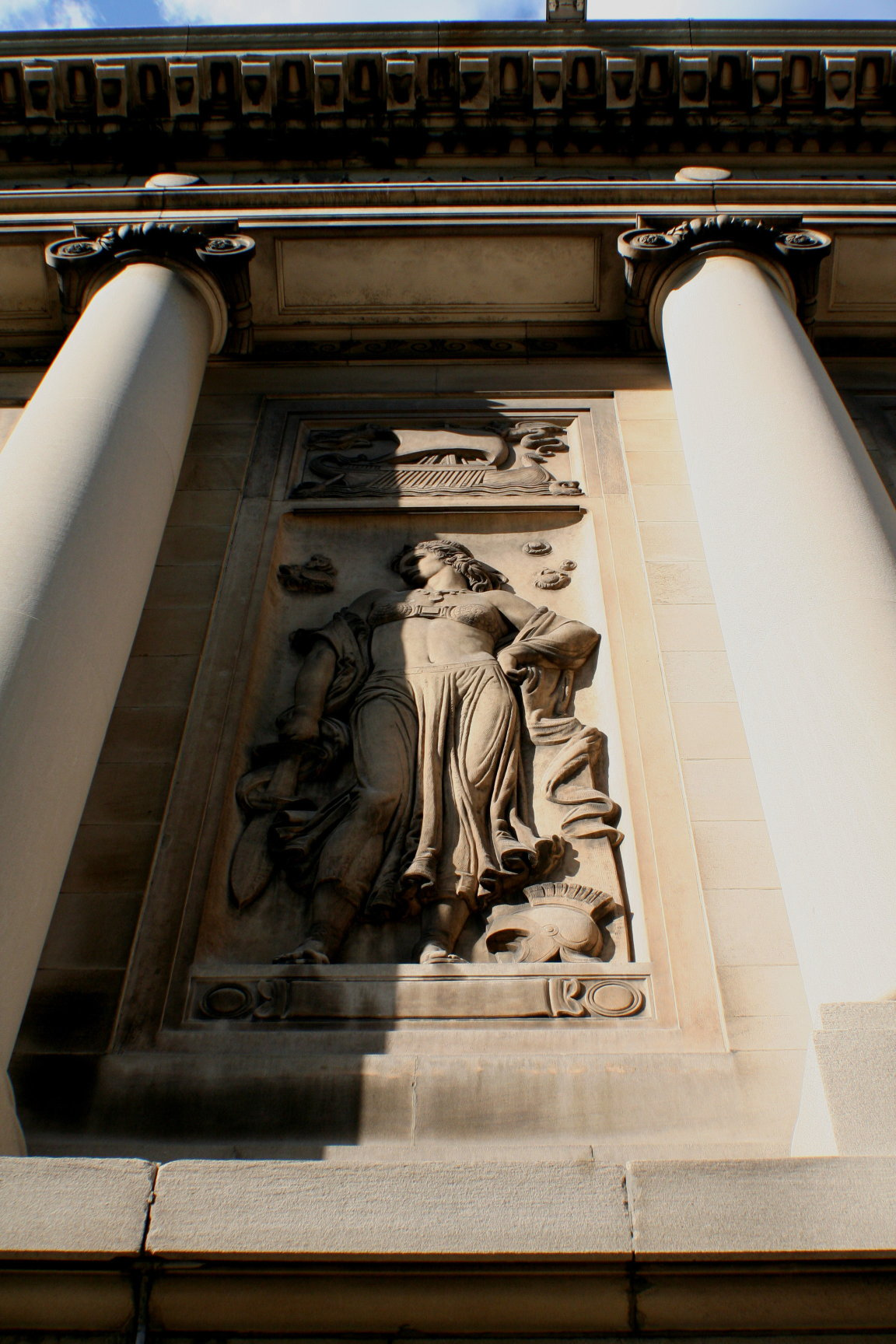
Nebel's work at the Hispanic Society of America, NYC

Berthold Nebel (1889–1964) was an American sculptor.

Berthold Nebel was born in 1889 in Basel, Switzerland, and came to the United States with his parents when he was a year old.

He could be confused with the German sculptor Paul Nebel from Düsseldorf, who is famous for motion studies of elks and bears that were cast in bronze on request by Kraas, Berlin.

== Training ==
By 1900 his parents had settled in New Jersey, and Nebel as a young boy took lessons in oil painting from “an artist lady” who told him she could teach him nothing more and that he must go to art school. He began work at a decorative terra cotta factory in Perth Amboy, New Jersey, where he learned to model in clay. This factory produced architectural ornaments for Fifth Avenue mansions at the time. This exposure to a new media shifted his interest from painting to sculpture.

While he was working days he studied at night at the National Academy of Design and the Mechanics' Institute, and attended James Earle Fraser's classes at the Art Students League of New York. Fraser was very supportive of Nebel’s work, and encouraged him to enter a competition. Nebel won the Rome Prize in 1914 when the subject for sculptors and painters was “Good Government.” He won the sculpture’s prize with a group of a seated woman, a standing man, and a child: a family and an interpretation of good government and good living that represented his personal philosophy throughout his life. The group was shown at the 30th Annual Exhibition of the Architectural League of New York in February 1915.

His three-year fellowship from 1914-1917 at the American Academy in Rome coincided with the early years of World War I. When the United States entered the war in 1917, Nebel remained in Italy and became a supply officer and interpreter for the Red Cross. With this job, he was able to marry the former Maria Lucantoni, whom he met at the American Academy in Rome when she was a model.

While at the Academy Nebel became interested in the plays of Sophocles. Nebel created a plaque of Oedipus Rex at Colonus. His models for this group were his future wife, her sister Francesco, and their father, who, like the literary figure he portrayed, also went blind in old age. As an Academician, Nebel met Rodin and was greatly influenced by his modern style. This encounter encouraged Nebel to depart from the Academy’s classical tradition. He executed the heroic group Wrestlers – two figures locked in Greco-Roman wrestling holds that prevent either man from winning. The figure was exhibited in Rome at the Italian artists’ Exposione di Belle Arte. Nebel was the only Academy to be asked to exhibit with the Italians in their expositions. Wrestlers was later exhibited in Pittsburgh, Pennsylvania; Baltimore, Maryland, and New York City.

== Work in New York ==
In 1920 Nebel returned to the United States with his wife, and his young son, Emil. He worked as an assistant to Fraser in his studio in McDougal Alley in New York City the winter of 1920, and while there he met Charles Follen McKim of the architectural firm McKim, Meade, and White. McKim, on seeing the Wrestlers, jokingly asked Nebel if her were “going Bolshevik” by doing all “this modern stuff,” referring to a contemporary association of modern art with Russia. Later that year Nebel accepted the post of Director of the School of Sculpture at Carnegie Institute of Technology, now Carnegie-Mellon University. He moved to Pittsburgh, Pennsylvania with his wife and son in 1920. While in Pittsburgh he won a competition sponsored by the Bureau of Mines and was commissioned to design and execute the Mine Rescue Medal. He was also commissioned by the Department of Interior to make the Congressional First Aid Medal. He designed a portrait relief of Theodore Roosevelt in bronze for the City County Building in Pittsburgh and a portrait relief of then First President of Carnegie Institute of Technology, Arthur Anton Hamerschlog. While teaching at Carnegie-Tech, Nebel and his wife had a daughter named Lucia.

Yearning to be back in New York City, Nebel returned to New York in 1925 and established a studio in the Bible Building on East 8th Street where he became engaged in architectural sculpture, principally ornamentation for the domes and niches of the Cunard Building on lower Broadway in New York City. He was also commissioned to make portrait statues of confederate General Joseph Wheeler for the rotunda of the United States Capitol in Washington, D.C., of General John Sedgwick for the front of the Connecticut State Capitol in Hartford, and of Alexander Brown for the entrance to Brown Brothers Bank on Wall Street in New York City.

In 1925, Nebel patented an enlarging machine for reproducing 3D sculpture by a “scrape method.” Models of any size could be enlarged from smaller originals. This provided a vast improvement over the “point” system which had been used to scale models up or down since the time of the classic Greek sculptors.

== Work at Audubon Terrace ==
A meeting with Archer M. Huntington in 1928 resulted in a series of commissions that occupied Nebel for more than a decade. The first project was two sets of bronze doors for the Museum of the American Indian and the Museum of the American Geographic Society in the complex of buildings he created at 155th Street and Broadway in New York City. This work required larger working space, and in 1930 Nebel moved his studio and home to Westport, Connecticut. He first worked in a converted barn on the 9-acre (36,000 m^{2}) farm he had bought and later specially constructed a stone studio building.

For the Hispanic Society of America, also at 155th Street and Broadway, Huntington commissioned Nebel to execute nine bas-relief panels measuring 5 feet (1.5 m) wide by 19 feet (5.8 m) high for the south façade of the building in limestone. Each panel’s single figure show a representation of a people – Celt, Primitive Man, Roman, Carthaginian, Arab, Phoenician, Greek, Visigoth, and Christian Knight, who had invaded and flourished in Spain. The work went on for ten years and the panels were installed in 1939. Huntington also commissioned a marble figure of The Nereid for Brookgreen Gardens, the sculpture museum he and his wife, sculptor Anna Hyatt Huntington, founded in South Carolina.

== Medallist ==
Six months before the atomic bomb was dropped on Hiroshima, Nebel had designed a medal called World Unity or Oblivion. This depicted on the reverse side the then-unfamiliar but now recognized “mushroom cloud” of a pyrocumulus explosion over a foreground covered by mutilated human bodies. Nebel was horrified by the advancing technological developments of warfare and wrote, “Modern warfare has developed to such a degree that civilization may vanish from the earth unless there is a better understanding among nations. This medal was designed to help impress that thought which I believe is uppermost in our minds.” The Society of Medalists issued the medal in 1945 immediately after the atomic bomb was dropped on Hiroshima. President Eisenhower later presented a copy to Queen Elizabeth II.

In 1957 Nebel was commissioned to design a medal to commemorate the crossing of the Mayflower replica and the 1620 signing of the Mayflower Compact on board the original ship. Silver copies of this medal were presented to President Eisenhower, Queen Elizabeth II, and Alan Villiers, captain of the second Mayflower. In 1960 on the 50th anniversary of the Medallic Art Company, Nebel also designed a medal to commemorate that event.

Over the years, while teaching and working on commissions, Nebel made many sketches, some cast only in plaster. These include preliminary designs for future works, ideas he was developing for national competitions and pieces for his own pleasure. Among these last are several portrait heads of his father Emil Nebel; Albin Polasek, a sculptor friend he met in Pittsburgh; Anthony Di Nardo, an architect from Cleveland; and Eugene Francis Savage, a muralist who had been a fellow Academician at the American Academy in Rome. Another group, which he sculpted around 1919, was Mother and Child, posed for by his wife “Marietta” and their son Emil. Another of these studies, sculpted and cast in bronze while he was working in Rome, is Conchetta, a woman carrying on her head the traditional copper water jug of the Italian hill towns.

One of the last figures he worked on, called Adventure, shows a man and woman riding together on a farm horse toward a new life, a tribute to the young people putting their lives together after World War II and perhaps a memory of his own life after World War I. His work had come full circle, again depicting the good life and good government in the simple form a man and a woman, a family, facing the world.

He died of leukemia in 1964 in Westport, Connecticut. Nebel was a fellow of the American Academy in Rome; a National Academician of the National Academy of Design, which holds in their permanent collection a small bronze study of Wrestlers; and a member of the National Sculpture Society.

Following his death, Nebel's studio was enjoyed by his daughter Lucia Nebel White, a photographer, and her husband, George A. White, the well-known builder-architect.

== Sources ==
- E. Benezit, Dictionnaire critique et documentaire des peintres, sculpteurs, dessinateurs, et graveurs, Volume 10, Grund. 1999
- Glenn B. Opitz, "Berthold Nebel," Dictionary of American Sculptors, Poughkeepsie, NY: Apollo, 1984, p. 290
- Beatrice Proske, "Berthold Nebel," Brookgreen Gardens Sculpture, Brookgreen Gardens, SC: 1968, pp. 344–346
- Maria White, "Berthold Nebel," America's Sculptural Heritage, Gloucester, MA: Gloucester Celebration, Inc, 1998, pp. 68–71
