= Statue of Jefferson Davis (Austin, Texas) =

Statue by Pompeo Coppini in Austin Texas, U.S.

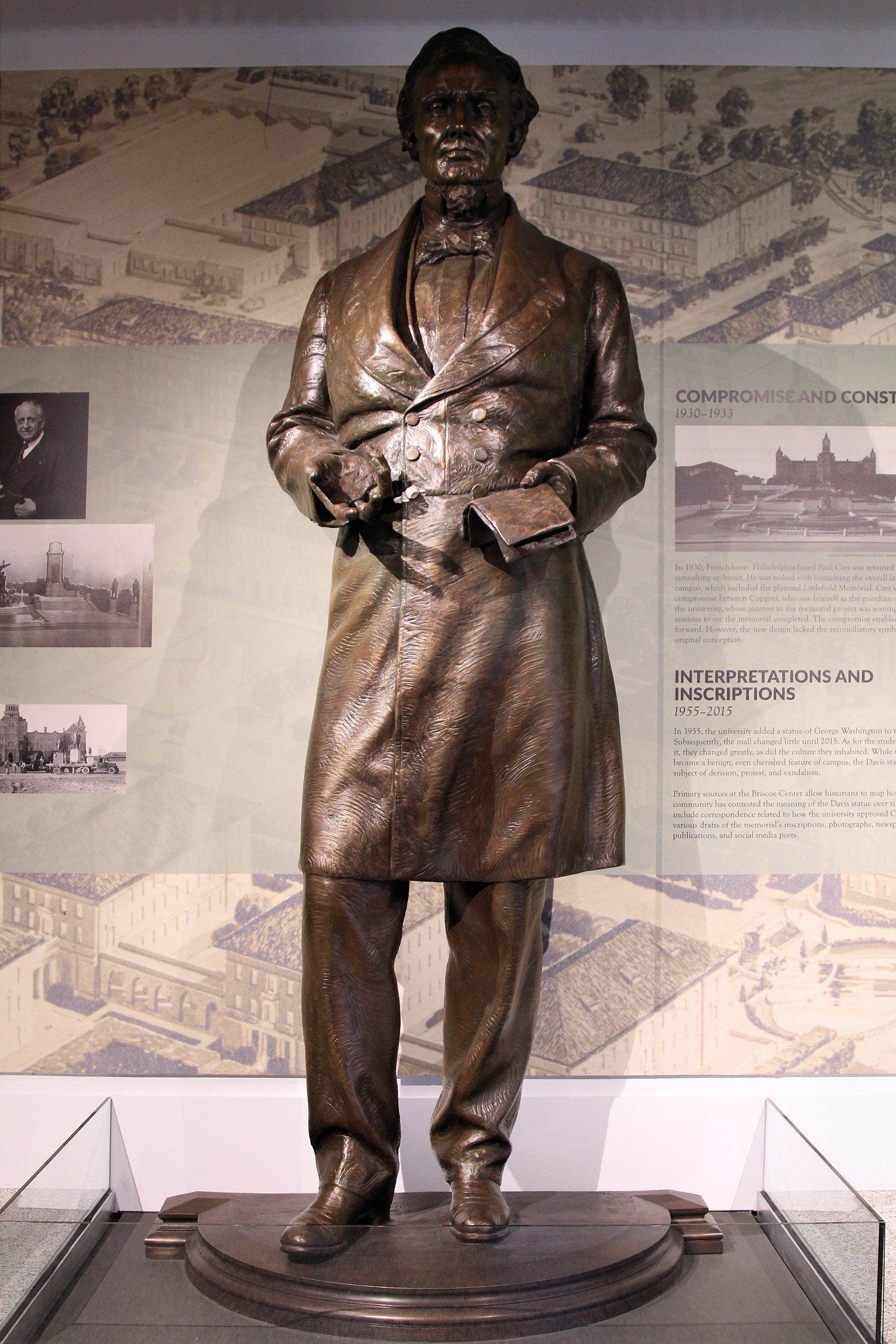
- The statue in the Dolph Briscoe Center for American History, 2018
- Artist: Pompeo Coppini
- Year: 1933
- Medium: Bronze
- Subject: Jefferson Davis
- Dimensions: 260 cm (102 in)
- Location: Dolph Briscoe Center for American History, Austin, Texas, United States
- Owner: University of Texas at Austin

Jefferson Davis is a statue depicting the American-Confederate politician of the same name by Pompeo Coppini. The sculpture was commissioned in 1919 by George W. Littlefield to be included in the Littlefield Fountain on the campus of the University of Texas at Austin. It was installed on the university's South Mall from 1933 to 2015, when it was relocated to the Dolph Briscoe Center for American History in Austin, Texas.

== History ==
In 1919, University of Texas regent George W. Littlefield donated funds to pay for the construction of a "Memorial Gateway" at the south entrance to the university's campus that would honor the Confederate dead from the Civil War. He hired San Antonio-based Italian-born sculptor Pompeo Coppini to design the monument, which was to include a number of statues of notable figures from the history of Texas and the American South. The memorial was ultimately redesigned as the Littlefield Fountain and instead dedicated to the university's students and alumni who had died in the Great War (now known as World War I).

As part of the memorial project, in the 1920s Coppini sculpted bronze statues of Jefferson Davis and five other Texan and Confederate notables selected by Littlefield, which he intended to display around the fountain. However, as construction on the memorial proceeded in the early 1930s, campus architect Paul Cret decided to instead install the six statues along the university's South Mall, where they were placed in 1933 as the construction of the fountain complex was completed.

=== Controversy and relocation ===
Beginning in 2015 and accelerating in 2017, a national controversy grew over the prominent positions of monuments and memorials to the Confederacy in many public spaces across the United States, and particularly in the American South. In this context, the statues of Confederate notables along the university's South Mall that Coppini had designed for the Littlefield Fountain attracted increased public criticism.

On September 2, 2015, Historians Tom Palaima and Al Martinich's piece was published. They're arguing against the University of Texas at Austin's decision to take down the Jefferson Davis statue, saying it's a "serious moral and ethical mistake." Instead of removal, they propose retaining the statues and adding plaques that contextualize their history. This would convert the artworks into tools of historical witness, demonstrating how society can change its moral direction.

In March 2015, UT's student government passed a resolution calling for the removal of Jefferson Davis from the South Mall. That August, the university in fact removed the statues of both Davis and Woodrow Wilson from the Mall and placed them in storage, despite a lawsuit from the Texas Division of the Sons of Confederate Veterans, which failed to persuade the Texas Supreme Court to block the plan. Davis was later relocated to the university's Dolph Briscoe Center for American History, where it has been displayed since 2017.

== See also ==
- Jefferson Davis (Lukeman), National Statuary Hall Collection, Washington, D.C.
- Jefferson Davis Monument (New Orleans, Louisiana)
- List of memorials to Jefferson Davis
- List of Confederate monuments and memorials
- Removal of Confederate monuments and memorials
