= List of memorials to Jefferson Davis =

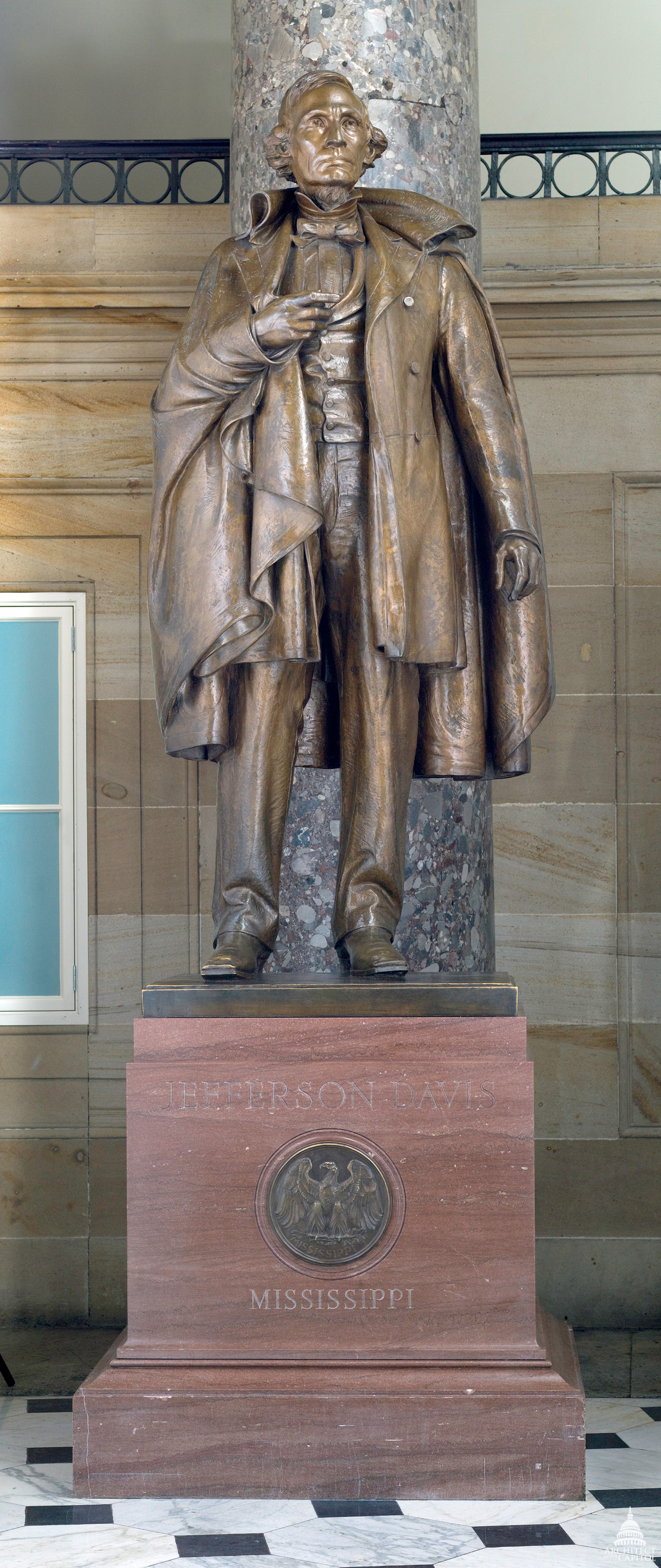
Jefferson Davis in National Statuary Hall

The following is a list of the memorials to Jefferson Davis, President of the Confederate States of America.

== Sculpture ==
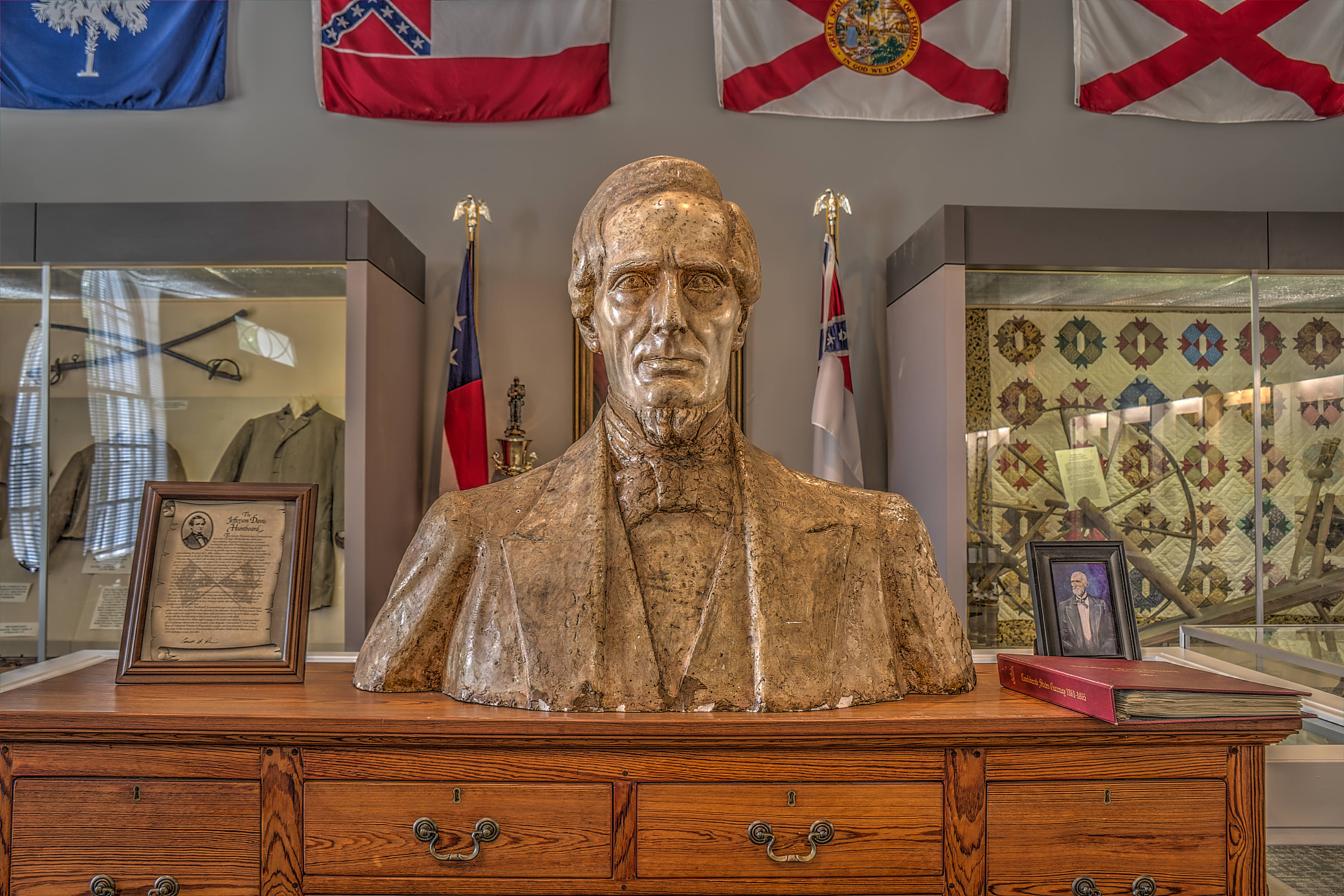
Bust of Davis at Jefferson Davis Memorial Historic Site

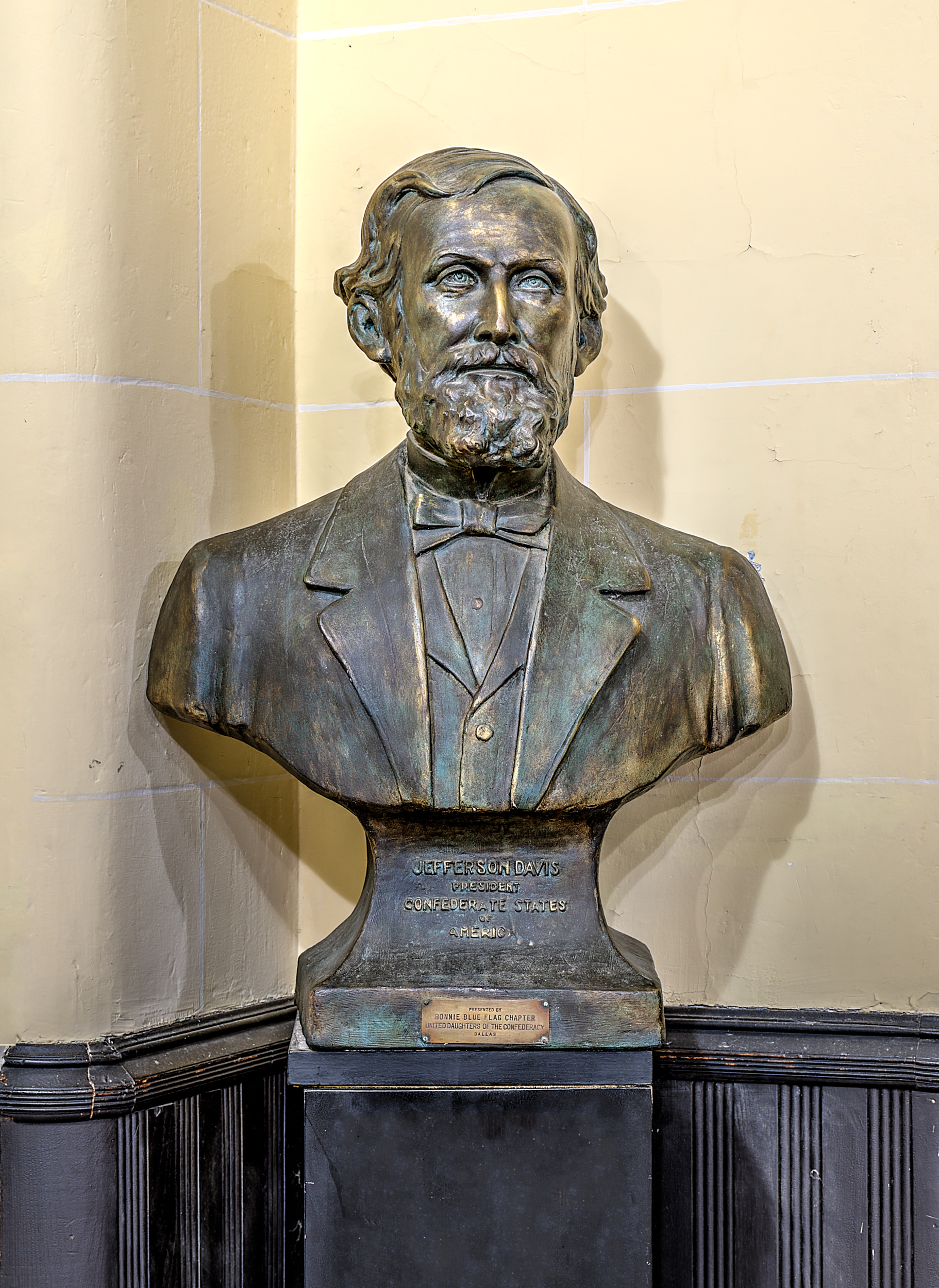
Bust of Davis at Old Warren County Courthouse

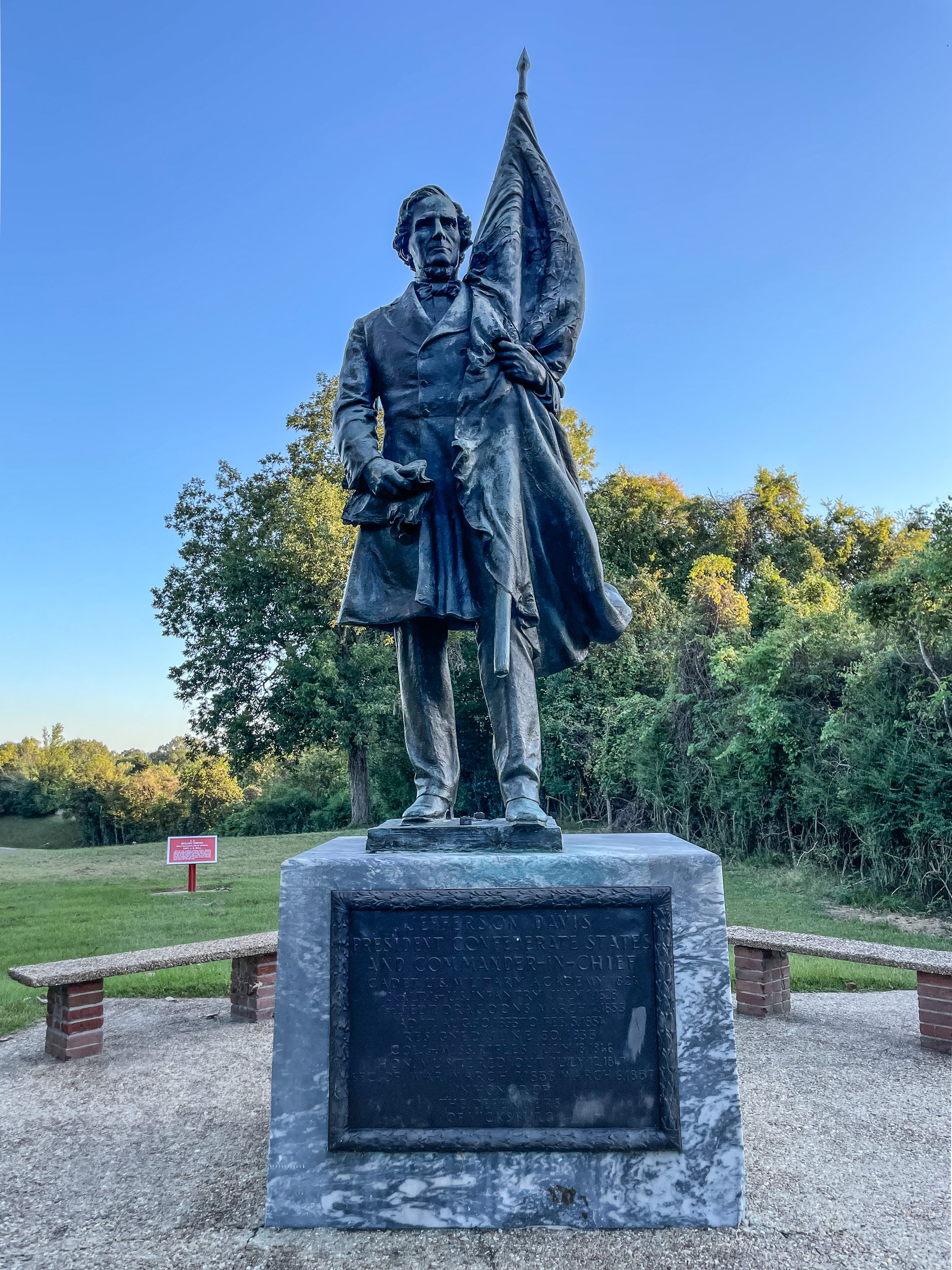
Memorial at Vicksburg National Military Park

- Jefferson Davis is included on a bas-relief sculpture on Stone Mountain, which is just east of Atlanta, Georgia.
- In May 2015, the student government at the University of Texas at Austin voted almost unanimously to remove a statue of Jefferson Davis that had been erected on the campus South Mall. Beginning shortly after the Charleston church shooting of 2015, "Black Lives Matter" had been written repeatedly in bold red letters on the base of the Davis statue. Previous messages had included "Davis must fall" and "Liberate U.T." University of Texas officials convened a task force to determine whether to honor the students' petition for removal of the statue. Acting on the strong recommendation of the task force, UT's president Gregory Fenves announced on August 13, 2015, that the statue would be relocated to serve as an educational exhibit in the university's Dolph Briscoe Center for American History museum. The statue was removed on August 30, 2015.
- A large 351-foot (107 m) tall concrete obelisk at the Jefferson Davis State Historic Site in Fairview, Kentucky, marks the site of his birthplace. Construction of the monument began in 1917 and finished in 1924 at a cost of about $200,000.
- A bust of Jefferson Davis is located at the Jefferson Davis Memorial Historic Site on the spot he was captured, outside Irwinville, Georgia, near Fitzgerald, Georgia.
- Another bust of Jefferson Davis is located outside the Jeff Davis County Court House building in Hazlehurst, Georgia.
- A statue of Jefferson Davis is depicted in the National Statuary Hall in the U.S. Capitol Building, for the state of Mississippi.
- Davis's former burial location at New Orleans' Metairie Cemetery is inscribed with his signature and the dates of his birth and death.
- A statue commemorating the bicentennial of Davis's birth was created by Civil War artist Gary Casteel, on behalf of the Sons of Confederate Veterans. It arrived at Davis's Beauvoir estate in Biloxi, Mississippi on October 14, 2009.
- There are statues of Davis in the Alabama, Virginia, and Kentucky state capitols—in Montgomery, on the grounds in front of the main entrance where he was sworn in as President of the Confederacy; in Richmond, in the old House of Delegates chamber; and inside the rotunda at Frankfort.
- Vicksburg National Military Park, located in Warren County, Mississippi (where the Davis family plantations, Brierfield and Hurricane, were located), contains two statues of Davis. The first is a stand-alone, larger-than-life figure known simply as the Davis Monument; and the second, a life-sized figure, appears next to a statue of Lincoln as part of the Kentucky monument.
- A bust of Davis with his second wife Varina is located in the rose garden outside the Old Courthouse Museum in Vicksburg, Mississippi.
- The 1891 Mississippi Monument to the Confederate Dead in Jackson, contains a life-sized, white marble statue of Jefferson Davis which was carved in Italy. At the time of its dedication, the monument's location was on the original State Capitol grounds in Jackson; it is currently in front of the Charlotte Capers Building on State Street, used by the Mississippi Department of Archives and History. In 1922, the statue was removed from the monument and placed in the rotunda of the Old Capitol, which was then used as legislators' offices (later becoming the Old Capitol Museum). In conjunction with the restoration of the Old Capitol and in anticipation of the Civil War Sesquicentennial, the statue was returned to its original location in the monument in 2009.

== Schools ==
- Jeff Davis Elementary, Primary, Middle, and High Schools in Hazlehurst, Georgia
- Jefferson Davis Elementary School in Greenwood, Mississippi (1907).
- Jefferson Davis Academy, a private school in Blackville, South Carolina
- Fort Davis Junior-Senior High School in Fort Davis, Texas.

== Inhabited places ==
- Jeff Davis County, Georgia (1905)
- Jefferson Davis Parish, Louisiana (1912)
- Jefferson Davis County, Mississippi (1906)
- CDP of Fort Davis, Texas
- Jeff Davis County, Texas (1887)

== Stamps ==
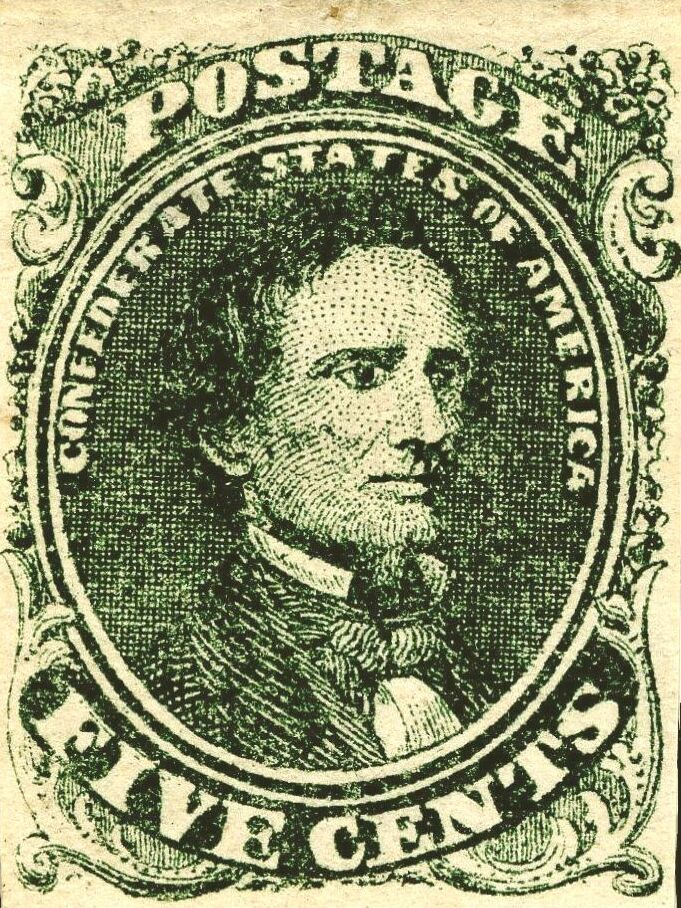
five cent 1861 issue

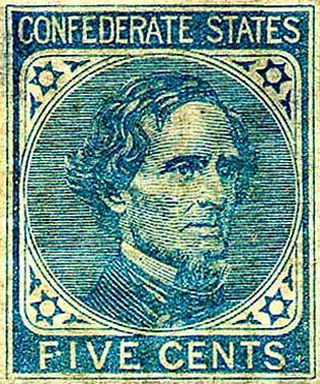
five cent 1862 issue

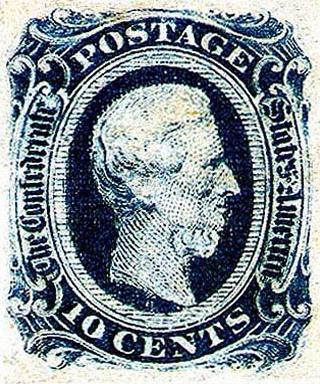
ten cent 1863 issue

Jefferson Davis postage stamps

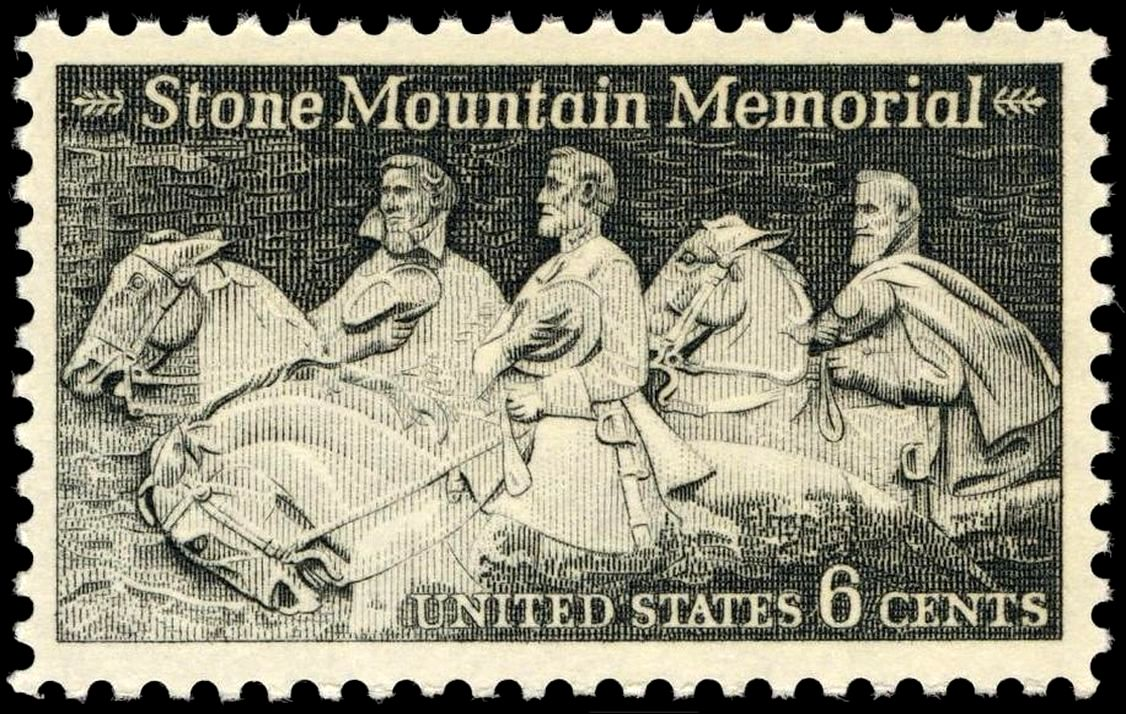
J. Davis on Stone Mountain 1970 issue

Davis appeared on several postage stamps issued by the Confederacy, including its first postage stamp (issued in 1861). In 1995, his portrait appeared on a United States postage stamp, part of a series of 20 stamps commemorating the 130th anniversary of the end of the Civil War. Davis was also celebrated on the six-cent Stone Mountain Memorial Carving commemorative on September 19, 1970, at Stone Mountain, Georgia. The stamp portrayed Jefferson Davis, Robert E. Lee and Thomas J. "Stonewall" Jackson on horseback. It depicts a replica of the actual memorial, carved into the side of Stone Mountain at 400 feet (120 m) above ground level, the largest high-relief sculpture in the world.

== Holidays ==
The birthday of Jefferson Davis is commemorated in several states. His actual birthday, June 3, is celebrated in Florida, Kentucky, Louisiana and Tennessee; in Alabama, it is celebrated on the first Monday in June. In Mississippi, the last Monday of May (Memorial Day) is celebrated as "National Memorial Day and Jefferson Davis's Birthday". In Texas, "Confederate Heroes Day" is celebrated on January 19, Robert E. Lee's birthday; Jefferson Davis's birthday had been officially celebrated on June 3 but was combined with Lee's in 1973.

== Miscellaneous ==
- The Jefferson Davis Presidential Library and Museum, on the grounds of Davis' last home, Beauvoir, at Biloxi, Mississippi, includes a bronze statue of Davis by Mississippi artist Bill Beckwith. From 1903 until 1957, Beauvoir served as a Confederate Veterans Home. The house and library were damaged by Hurricane Katrina in 2005; the renovated home reopened in 2008. Bertram Hayes-Davis, Davis's great-great-grandson, served as executive director of Beauvoir, which is owned by the Mississippi Division of the Sons of Confederate Veterans. Bertram Hayes-Davis resigned in 2014. The original Jefferson Davis presidential library suffered irreparable damage from Hurricane Katrina; consequently, a new library was constructed and opened June 3, 2013.
- Jefferson Davis Memorial Historic Site is located near Fitzgerald, Georgia.
- The state of Alabama celebrates Jefferson Davis's birthday on the first Monday in June. The state of Mississippi observes Davis's birthday in conjunction with the Memorial Day Federal holiday.
- Jefferson Davis was honorarily inducted into the Kappa Sigma fraternity (Virginia Military Institute – Xi chapter) following his son's death. He is currently the only honorary member of the fraternity.

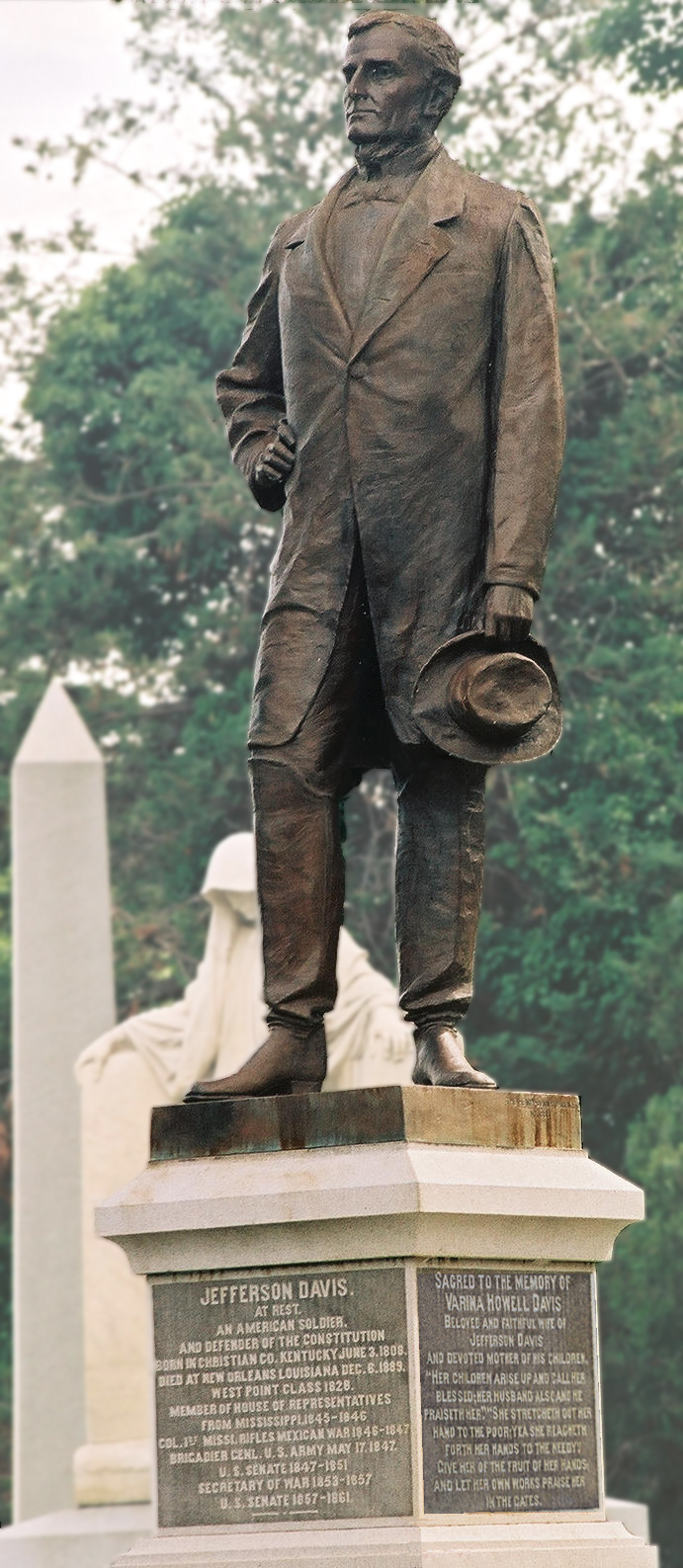
Jefferson Davis grave at the Hollywood Cemetery

- Section 3 of the Fourteenth Amendment to the United States Constitution barred from office anyone who had violated their oath to protect the Constitution by serving in the Confederacy. That prohibition included Davis. In 1978, pursuant to authority granted to Congress under the same section of the Amendment, Congress posthumously removed the ban on Davis with a two-thirds vote of each house and President Jimmy Carter signed it. These actions were spearheaded by Congressman Trent Lott of Mississippi. Congress had previously taken similar action on behalf of Robert E. Lee.
- The desk used by Jefferson Davis on the floor of the U.S. Senate, repaired after Union soldiers damaged it during the Civil War, is reserved by Senate Rules for the senior Senator from Mississippi (currently Senator Roger Wicker).
- The former transnational Jefferson Davis Highway was named in his honor. In 1913, the United Daughters of the Confederacy conceived the Jefferson Davis Memorial Highway, a transcontinental highway to be built through the South. Portions of the highway's route in Virginia, Alabama and other states still bear the name of Jefferson Davis. However, in Alexandria, Virginia, the city council voted unanimously to rename the highway and has solicited public suggestions for a new name. In Arlington County, Virginia, that portion of the highway was renamed Richmond Highway in 2019. A Sons of Confederate Veterans owned "park" alongside Interstate 5 between Vancouver and Ridgefield, containing the two granite markers which used to reside at each end of the Jefferson Davis Highway in Washington state is named in honor of Davis.

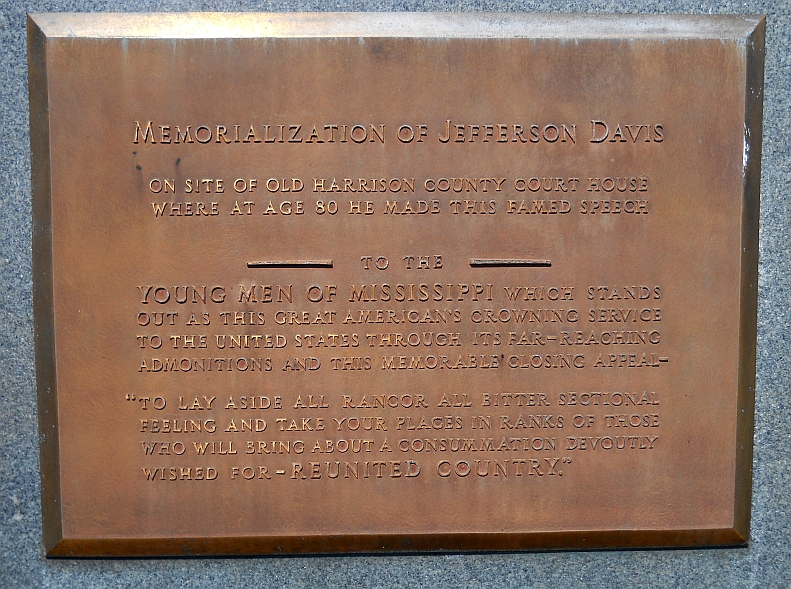
Memorial of Jefferson Davis's final speech.

- In 2009, a bronze plaque was dedicated at the site of the old courthouse in Mississippi City, Mississippi, to memorialize the final speech delivered by Jefferson Davis, where he pleaded for unity of all U.S. citizens after the American Civil War.
- Jefferson Davis Hospital began operations in 1924 and was the first centralized municipal hospital to treat indigent patients in Houston, Texas. The building was designated as a protected historic landmark on November 13, 2013, by the Houston City Council and is monitored by the Historic Preservation Office of the City of Houston Department of Planning and Development. The hospital was named for Jefferson Davis, former president of the Confederacy, in honor of the Confederate soldiers who had been buried in the cemetery and as a means to console the families of the deceased.
- The United Daughters of the Confederacy monument to Jefferson Davis at the Fort Crawford Cemetery in Prairie du Chien, Wisconsin. Davis was stationed at Fort Crawford, Michigan Territory in 1831.
- Fort Davis National Historic Site began as a frontier military post in October 1854, in the mountains of western Texas. It was named after then-United States Secretary of War Jefferson Davis. That fort gave its name to the surrounding Davis Mountains range.
- When Davis evacuated Richmond, his belongings continued on the train bound for Cedar Key, Florida. They were first hidden at Senator David Levy Yulee's plantation in Florida, then placed in the care of a railroad agent in Waldo. On June 15, 1865, Union soldiers seized Davis's personal baggage from the agent, together with some of the Confederate government's records. A historical marker was erected to commemorate this site.
- The Papers of Jefferson Davis is an editing project based at Rice University in Houston, Texas to publish documents related to Davis. Since the early 1960s, it has published 14 volumes, the first in 1971 and the most recent in 2015; more volumes are planned. The project has roughly 100,000 documents in its archives.
- The Confederate Memorial Hall Museum has a portrait of Pope Pius IX that he sent to Davis after he was captured. It is inscribed with the Latin words "Venite ad me omnes qui laboratis, et ego reficiam vos, dicit Dominus", which correspond to the Biblical passage of Matthew 11:28, "Come to me, all you that labor, and are burdened, and I will refresh you, sayeth the Lord". A hand-woven crown of thorns that was probably woven by Davis's wife encircles it.

== Removal of Jefferson Davis Memorials ==
Many memorials and statues commemorating Davis have been removed as part of a larger, society-wide reckoning with the historical legacy of the Confederacy, as many states and municipalities have re-examined the appropriateness of using public space to honor figures that supported slavery and secession.

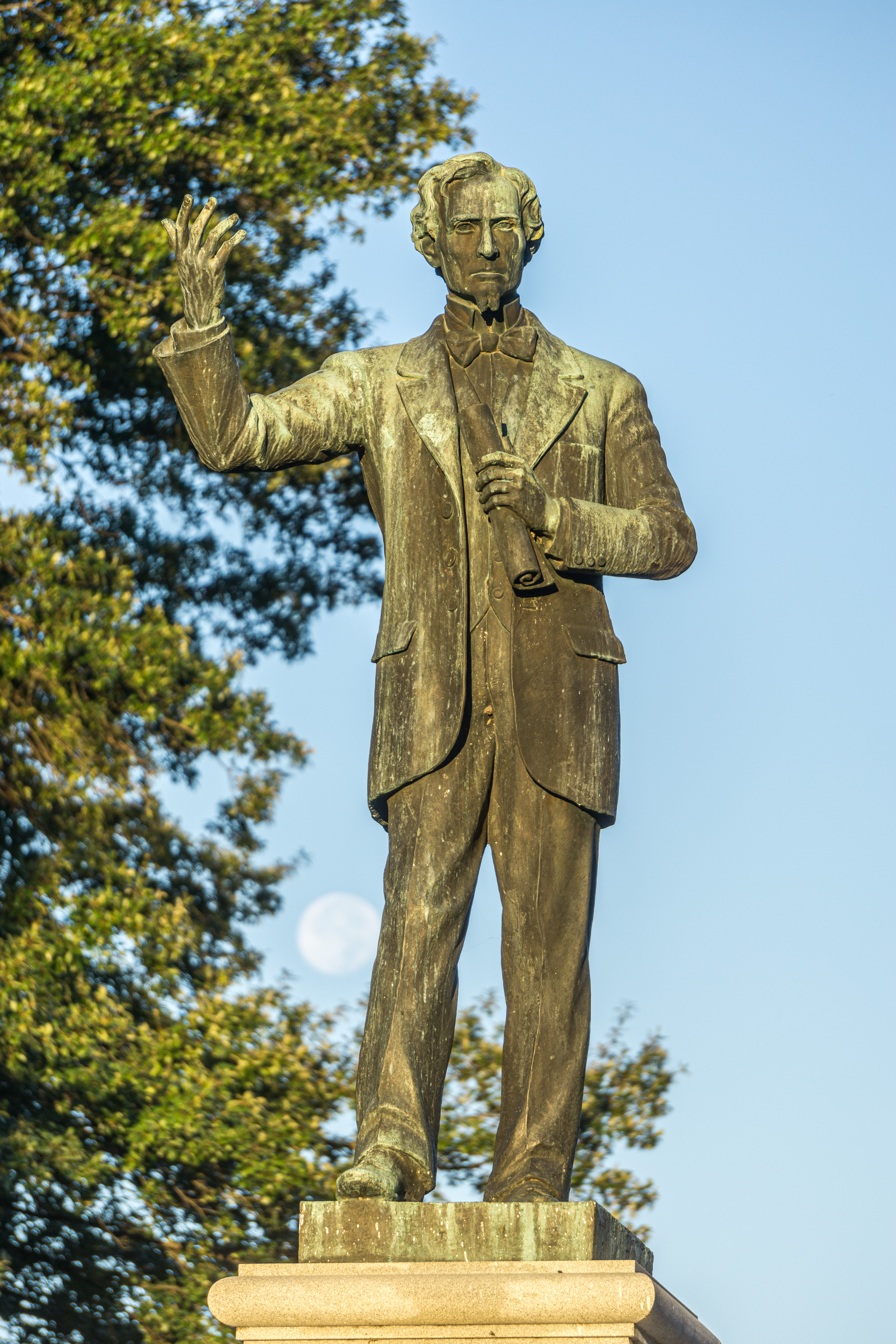
Statue formerly at Memphis Park. Removed in 2017.

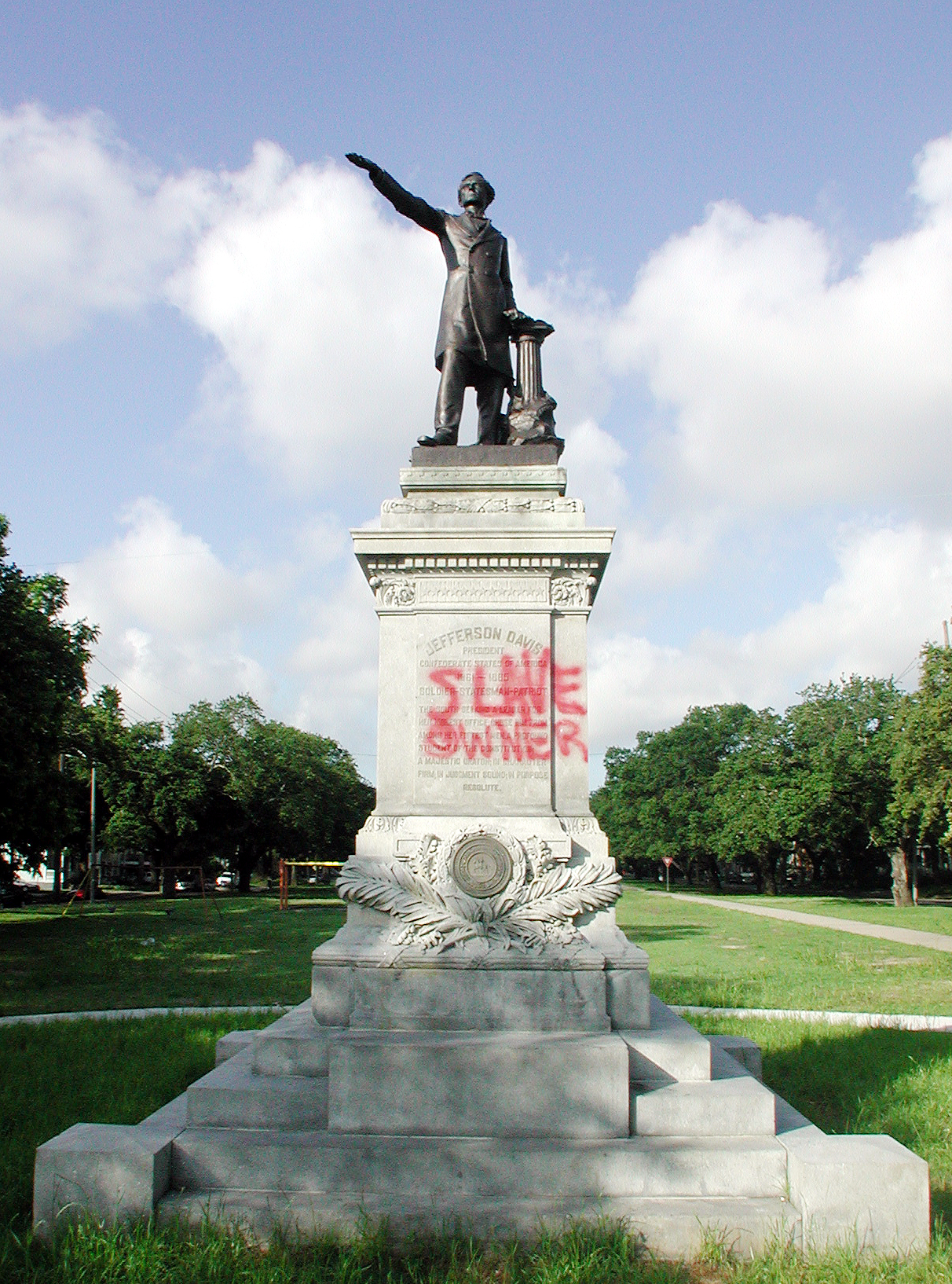
The Jefferson Davis monument in New Orleans vandalized by local residents, May 2004. It was eventually dismantled in 2017.

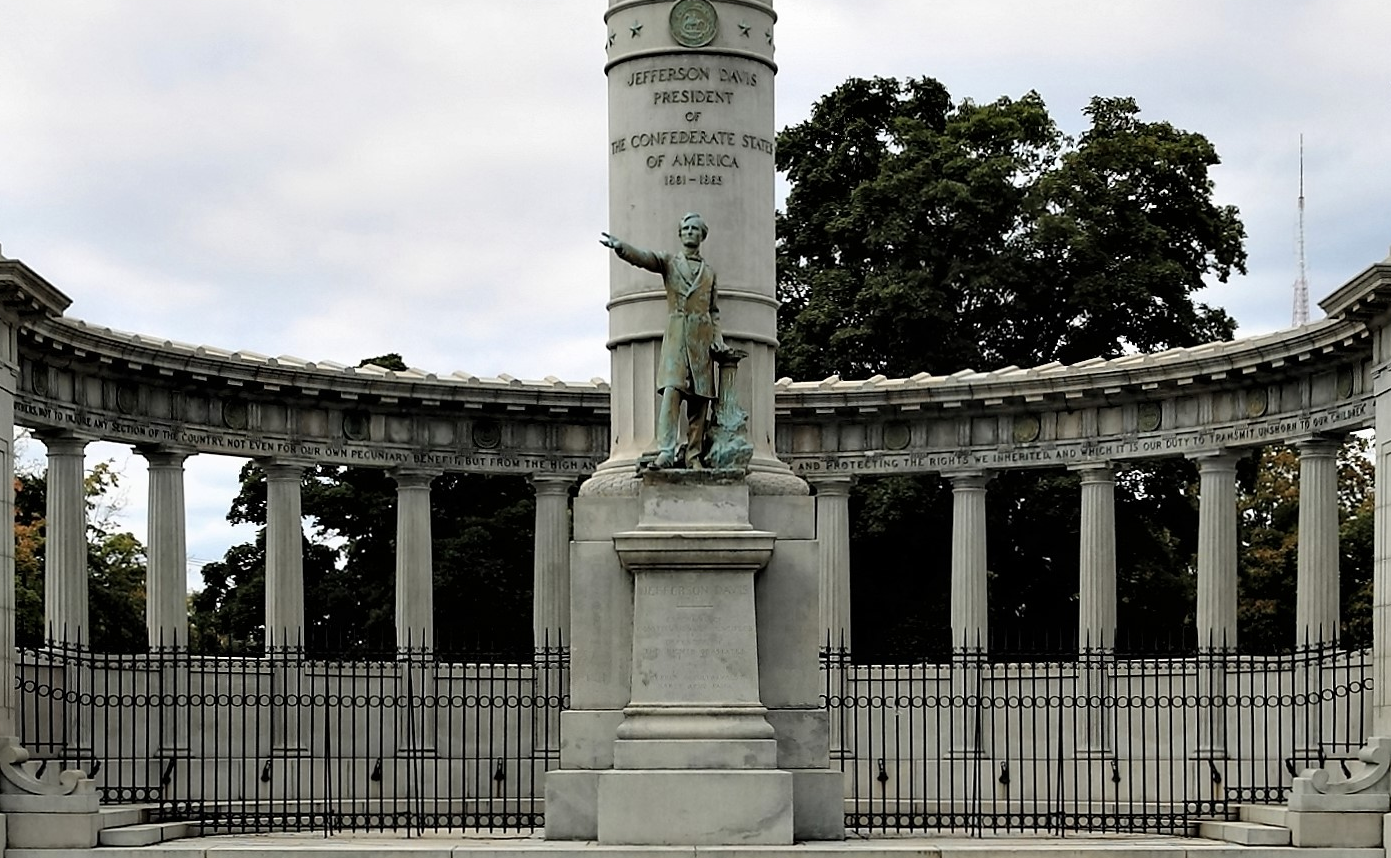
Jefferson Davis Monument and statue, Richmond, Virginia, in 2013.

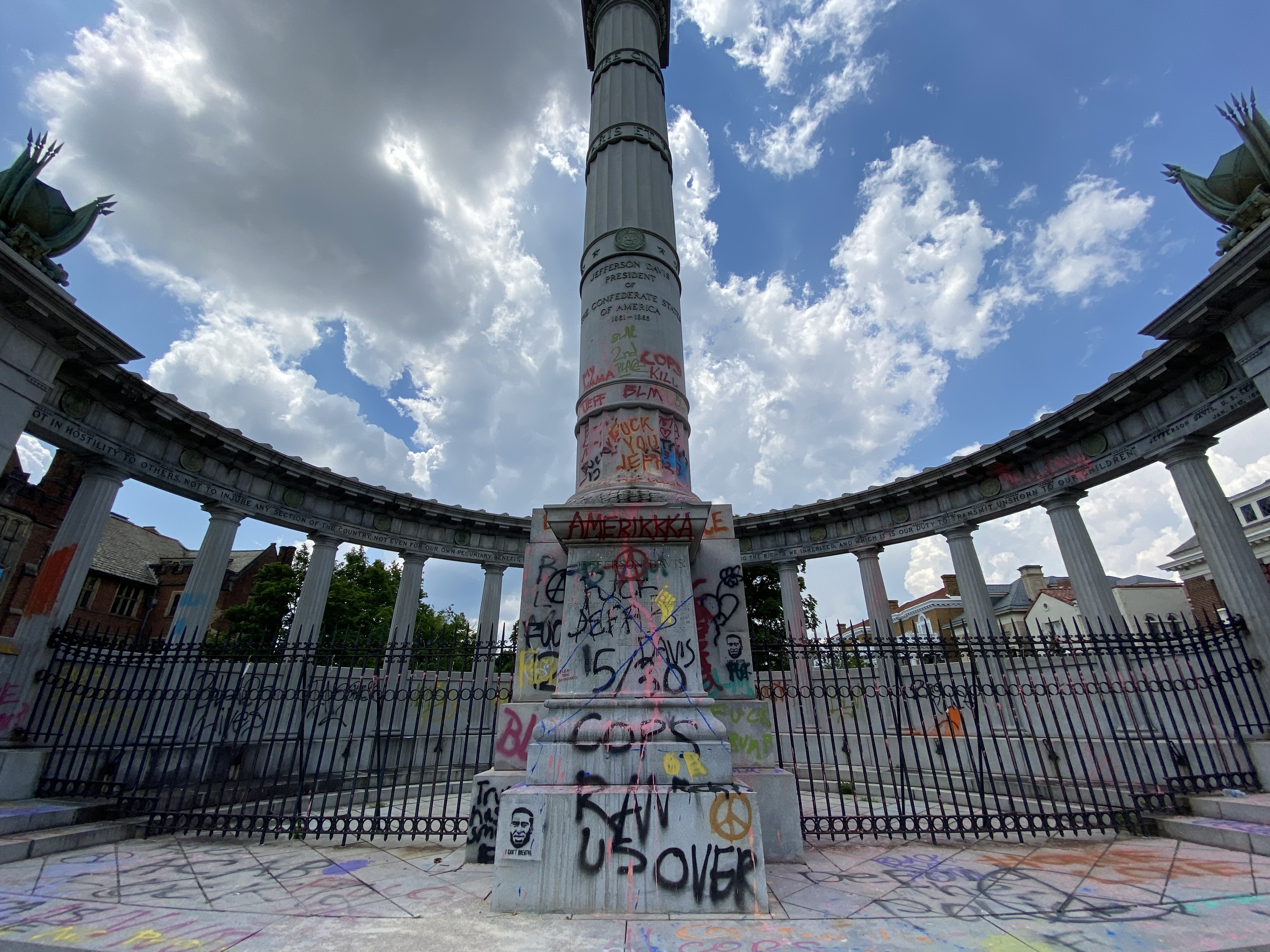
Jefferson Davis Monument in Richmond, VA on July 1, 2020, following the protests over the murder of George Floyd. The Davis statue was toppled by protesters on June 10, 2020.

== Former ==
=== Mountains ===
- Jeff Davis Peak was the former name of Doso Doyabi, the second highest summit in the Snake Range in Nevada, was named in honor of Jefferson Davis in 1855. Davis was then serving as Secretary of War in the United States government.

=== Schools ===
- Jefferson Davis Community College in Brewton, Alabama (1965). Renamed Coastal Alabama Community College (2017)
- Jefferson Davis High School in Montgomery, Alabama (1968) Renamed Johnson Abernathy Graetz High School (2022).
- Jefferson Davis Middle School in Jacksonville, Florida (1961). Renamed Charger Academy in 2021.
- Jefferson Davis Middle School in West Palm Beach, Florida. (1906). Renamed Palm Springs Middle School (2005).
- Jefferson Davis Elementary School in New Orleans, Louisiana, was renamed for Ernest "Dutch" Morial, the city's first black mayor.
- Jeff Davis Elementary School in Biloxi, Mississippi (1960). Renamed Back Bay Elementary (2020).
- Jefferson Davis Campus of Mississippi Gulf Coast Community College in Gulfport, Mississippi (1965). Renamed Harrison County Campus (2020).
- Davis Magnet School in Jackson, Mississippi (1906). Renamed Barack Obama Magnet School (2017).
- Jefferson Davis Elementary School in Dallas, Texas. Renamed in 1999 for Barbara Jordan, civil rights leader and congresswoman.
- Jefferson Davis High School in Houston, Texas (1926). Renamed Northside High School (2016).
- Jefferson Davis Middle School in Hampton, Virginia (1960). Renamed Cesar Tarrant Middle School (2018)
- Lee–Davis High School in Mechanicsville, Virginia (1959). Renamed Mechanicsville High School (2020).

=== Sculpture ===
- In Pensacola, Florida, an obelisk was dedicated in 1891 in memory of Jefferson Davis, Stephen R. Mallory, Edward Aylesworth Perry, and the Uncrowned Heroes of the Southern Confederacy. The Pensacola City Council voted to remove the statue and rename the plaza from "Lee Square" to its original "Florida Square" in July 2020 following the George Floyd protests.
- In New Orleans, there was a carved stone memorial to Jefferson Davis at First and Camp streets, next to the home where he died, as well as a life-sized statue at the corner of Jeff Davis Parkway and Canal Street. By decision of the New Orleans City Council in December 2015, the statue was to be removed; opposition lawsuits delayed the removal until May 11, 2017.
- A statue of Jefferson Davis stood in Memphis Park (originally, "Confederate Park") in Memphis, Tennessee. Removed in 2017.
- A Jefferson Davis Memorial was unveiled on June 3, 1907, on Monument Avenue in Richmond, Virginia, and a life-sized statue by George Julian Zolnay marks his grave at Hollywood Cemetery in that city. On June 10, 2020, the monument was toppled by protestors in the aftermath of the murder of George Floyd.

== See also ==
- List of Confederate monuments and memorials
