= Dante Sodini =

Italian sculptor

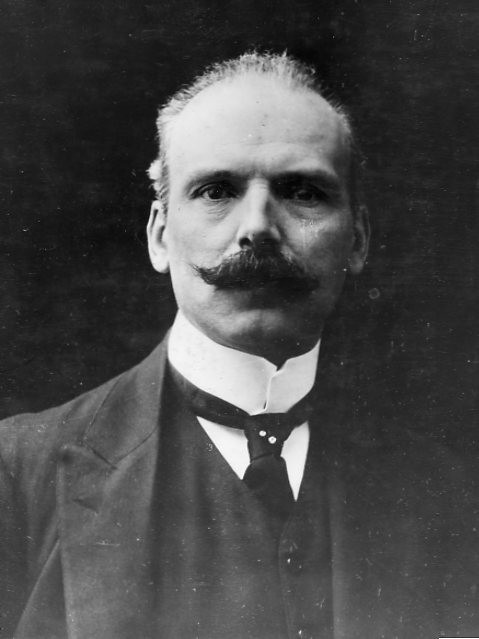

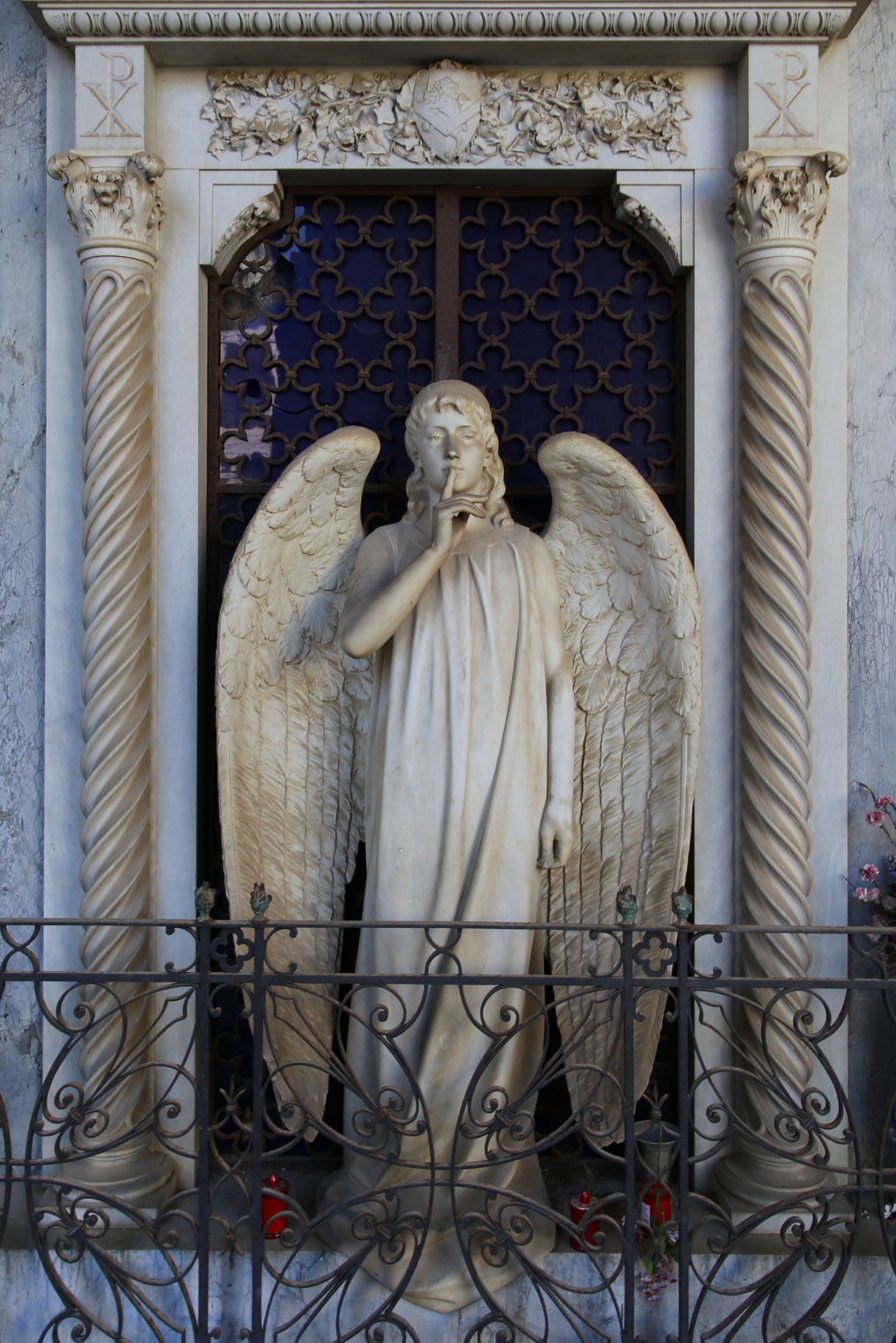
Angel of Silence, 1890–1891, cimitero della Misericordia dell'Antella (Florence)

Dante Sodini (August 29, 1858 in Florence – 1934 in Florence) was an Italian sculptor, mainly of religious subjects and funereal monuments.

In 1879, he sculpted a head of an old man, which won a contest with 2000 lire to encourage young artists. In 1883, he exhibited The Faith which depicts a blind man kneeling before a cross, exhibited in Rome, exhibited again at the Promotrice of Florence, was awarded the premio triennale of 3000 lire. He then completed four statues for the facade of the Duomo of Florence, depicting: Saints Celestino; Calisto; Bonaventura; and Girolamo.

Among his portraits are those of Giovanni Gualberto Bertini, found at the Camposanto della Misericordia of Florence; of the Baron Rossi and marchese Aymerich, both at Cagliari; of comm. Balduino, for the Credito Mobiliare; that of compianto Celestino Bianchi for the Porte Sante of Florence, and of Senators Maria Terenzano and Andreucci, for the Provincial deputation. He also completed a portrait of Queen Victoria, and of capo maestro Marucelli, called Canapino, for the Castle of Vincigliata at Sinalunga, and the other of marchese Lenzoni at the palace of this family. Sodini participated in the 1885 contest to design for Rome an equestrian monument dedicated to Vittorio Emanuele. His design garnered honorable mention.

He completed six bronze statuettes for an altar in Pomarance, and marble bust of Beatrice, donated to the City Hall of Florence, and placed at the Casa di Dante. Among the funereal monuments are a funereal monument for the ValIeri at Cemetery of Antella, a medallion of cavaliere Tartini Selvatici. Or the monument for the Bianchini family at the Cemetery of Rimini, and a bust in marble of the professor Pacini, for the Hall of Anatomy at the Ospedale of Florence, and of other famous Florentines for display in the Cloister of Santa Croce. He completed a funereal monument for the Giudice of the City of Montevideo, Uruguay. In white marble, a widow kneels before a plaque below the bust of the departed. He became a professor of sculpture at the Academy of Fine Arts of Florence.

== See also ==
- Statue of Jabez Lamar Monroe Curry
