= Statue of Alexander H. Stephens =

Statue by Gutzon Borglum

Alexander Hamilton Stephens
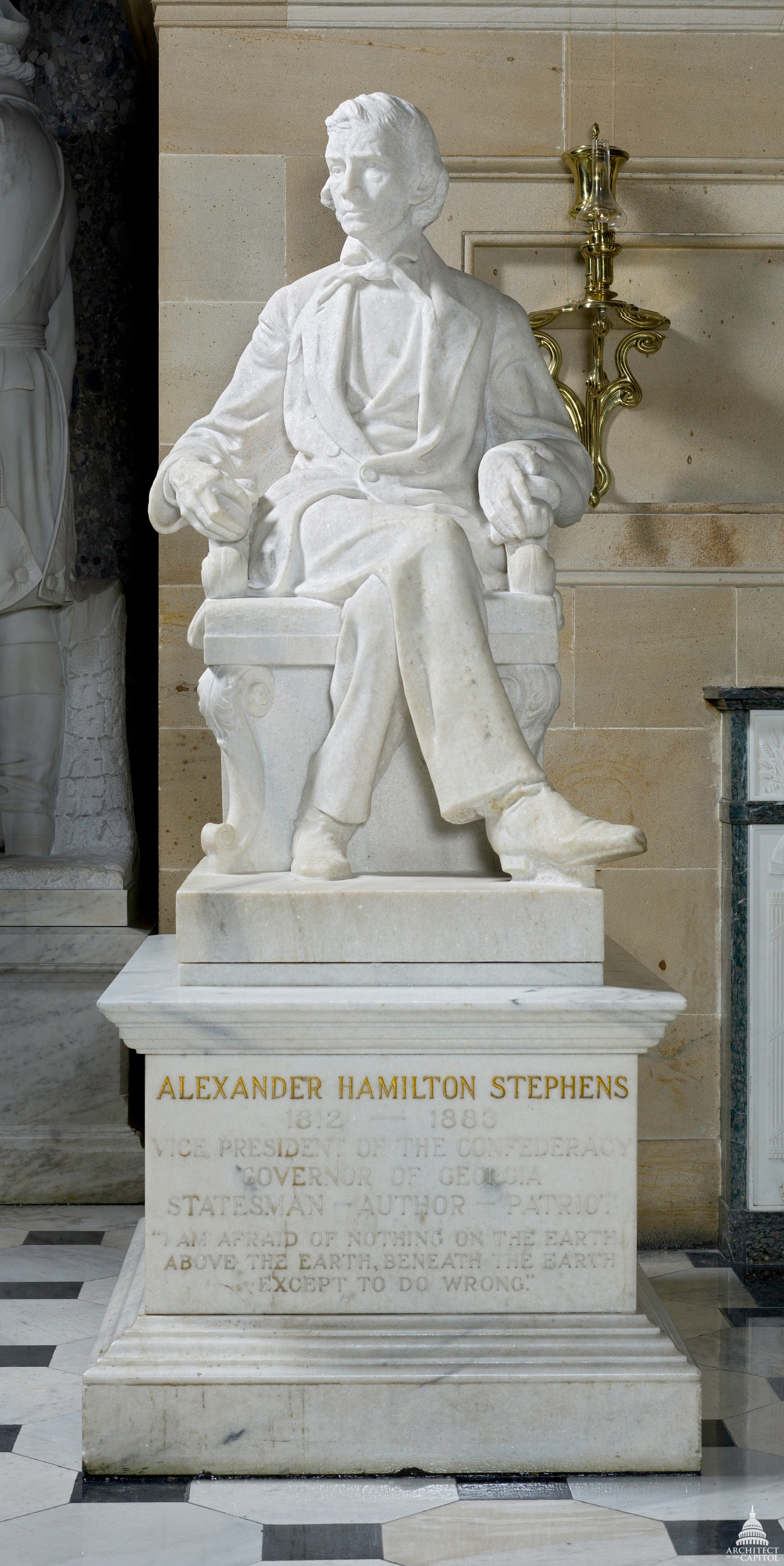
- The statue in 2013
- Artist: Gutzon Borglum
- Medium: Marble sculpture
- Subject: Alexander H. Stephens
- Location: Washington, D.C., United States

Alexander H. Stephens is a marble sculpture commemorating the American politician of the same name by Gutzon Borglum, installed in the United States Capitol as part of the National Statuary Hall Collection. The statue was gifted by the state of Georgia in 1927.

Stephens earned his place in the National Statuary Hall Collection by being elected to the US House of Representatives both before and after the Civil War and serving as the Vice-President of the Confederate States of America. At the unveiling of Stephen's statue on December 8, 1927, William J. Harris said of him, "His public career shows him time and again placing his loyalty to principles above subservience to political party; time and again refusing to follow where he thought principles were being set aside for party purposes."

On March 31, 1861, Stephens delivered the Cornerstone Speech which defended slavery as a just result of the inferiority of the "black race". Because of this, in 2017, some of Stephens's relatives asked that the statue be removed from the Capitol.

== See also ==
- 1927 in art
- Confederate artworks in the United States Capitol
- List of Confederate monuments and memorials
