= Statue of Helen Keller =

Sculpture in Statuary Hall

Helen Keller
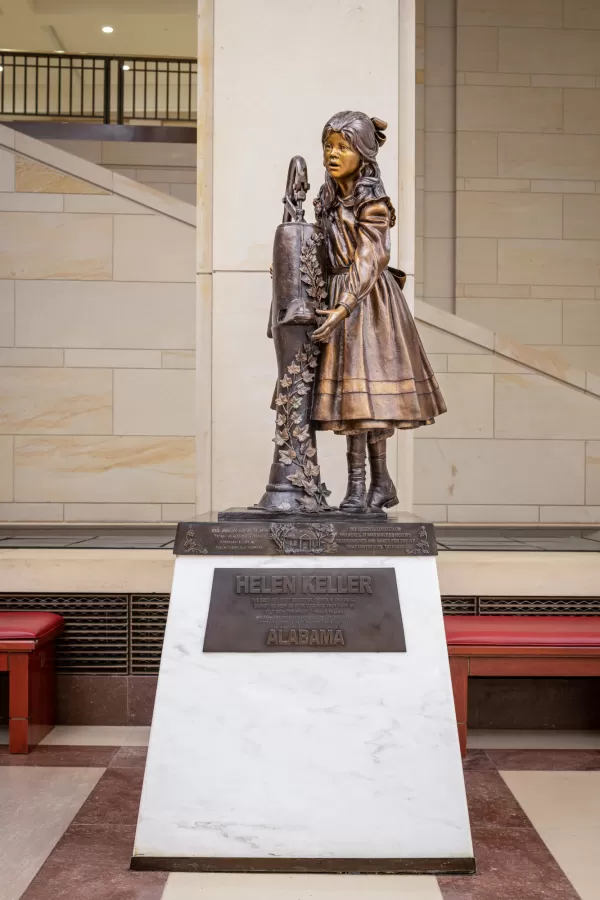
- The statue in 2009
- Artist: Edward Hlavka
- Medium: Bronze sculpture
- Subject: Helen Keller
- Location: Washington, D.C., United States

Helen Keller is a bronze sculpture depicting the American author and political activist of the same name by Edward Hlavka, installed in the United States Capitol Visitor Center's Emancipation Hall, in Washington, D.C., as part of the National Statuary Hall Collection. The statue was gifted by the U.S. state of Alabama in 2009, and replaced one depicting Jabez Lamar Monroe Curry, which had been donated in 1908.

== Description and history ==
On October 7, 2009, a bronze statue of Keller was added to the National Statuary Hall Collection, as a replacement for the State of Alabama's former 1908 statue of the education reformer Jabez Lamar Monroe Curry. It is displayed in the United States Capitol Visitor Center and depicts Keller as a seven-year-old child standing at a water pump. The statue represents the seminal moment in Keller's life when she understood her first word: W-A-T-E-R, as signed into her hand by teacher Anne Sullivan. The pedestal base bears a quotation in raised Latin and braille letters: "The best and most beautiful things in the world cannot be seen or even touched, they must be felt with the heart." The statue is the first one of a person with a disability and of a child to be permanently displayed at the U.S. Capitol.

== See also ==
- 2009 in art
