= Statue of Joseph Wheeler =

Sculpture in Statuary Hall

Joseph Wheeler
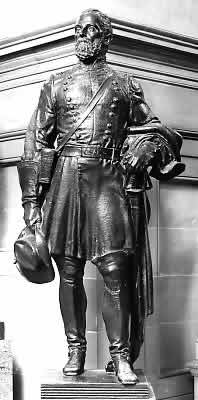
- The statue
- Artist: Berthold Nebel
- Medium: Bronze sculpture
- Subject: Joseph Wheeler
- Location: Washington, D.C., United States

Joseph Wheeler is a bronze sculpture commemorating the Confederate and American military commander and politician of the same name by Berthold Nebel, installed in the United States Capitol as part of the National Statuary Hall Collection. The statue was gifted by the state of Alabama in 1925.

Wheeler fought for two different armies in two different wars: for the Confederate States Army in the Civil War and for the United States Army in the Spanish–American War, where he saw active service both in Cuba and the Philippines. During the Civil War Wheeler was known as "Fighting Joe" by his soldiers and had 16 horses shot out from under him. He also served in the US House of Representatives from 1883 to 1900.

Henry B. Steagall said of Wheeler at the state's unveiling in the Capitol, "General Wheeler, with the same courage that had characterized his conduct on the field of battle accepted bravely and without a murmur the result of the conflict and went back home to engage in the struggle to bring order out of chaos, to free his people from misrule and usurpation, and set his state once more on the glad highway of peace and happiness – March 12, 1925"

== See also ==
- 1925 in art
- List of Confederate monuments and memorials
