= Statue of Wade Hampton III =

Statue in the U.S. Capitol

Wade Hampton III
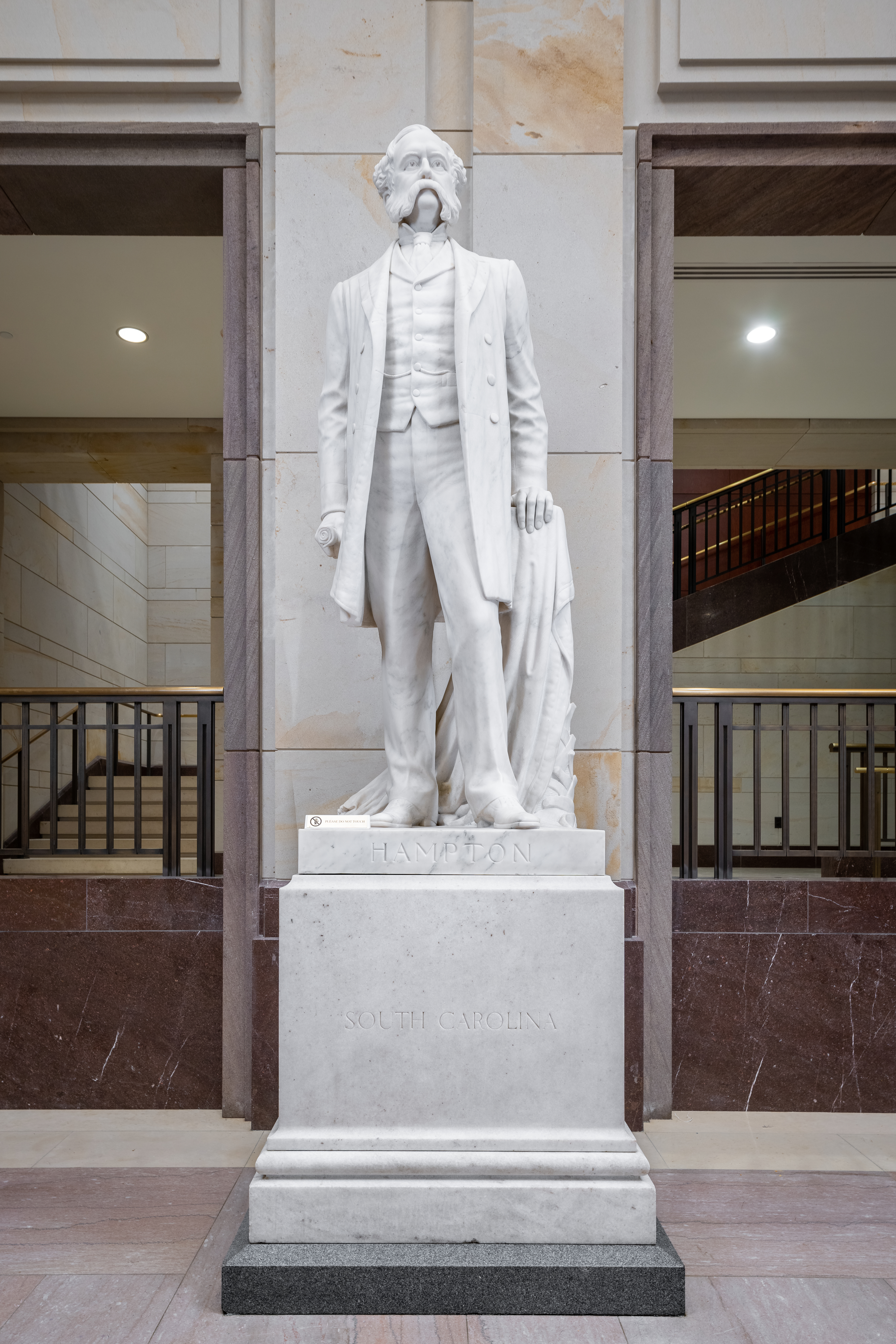
- The statue at the United States Capitol Visitor Center in 2023
- Artist: Frederick Ruckstull
- Medium: Marble sculpture
- Subject: Wade Hampton III
- Location: Washington, D.C., United States

Wade Hampton III is a 1929 marble sculpture depicting the military officer and politician of the same name by Frederick Ruckstull, installed in the United States Capitol, in Washington D.C., as part of the National Statuary Hall Collection. It is one of two statues donated by the state of South Carolina. The statue was accepted into the collection by Duncan Heyward on June 10, 1929.

Hampton is one of several Confederate States of America civilian and military leaders enshrined in the National Statuary Hall Collection, although unlike some of the others Hampton is not portrayed wearing his CSA uniform. Ruckstull had previously executed an equestrian statue of Hampton in 1906 that was installed in front of the South Carolina State House in Columbia, South Carolina.
