= Brook Road Marker, Jefferson Davis Highway =

Site in Henrico County, Virginia

- U.S. National Register of Historic Places
- Virginia Landmarks Register
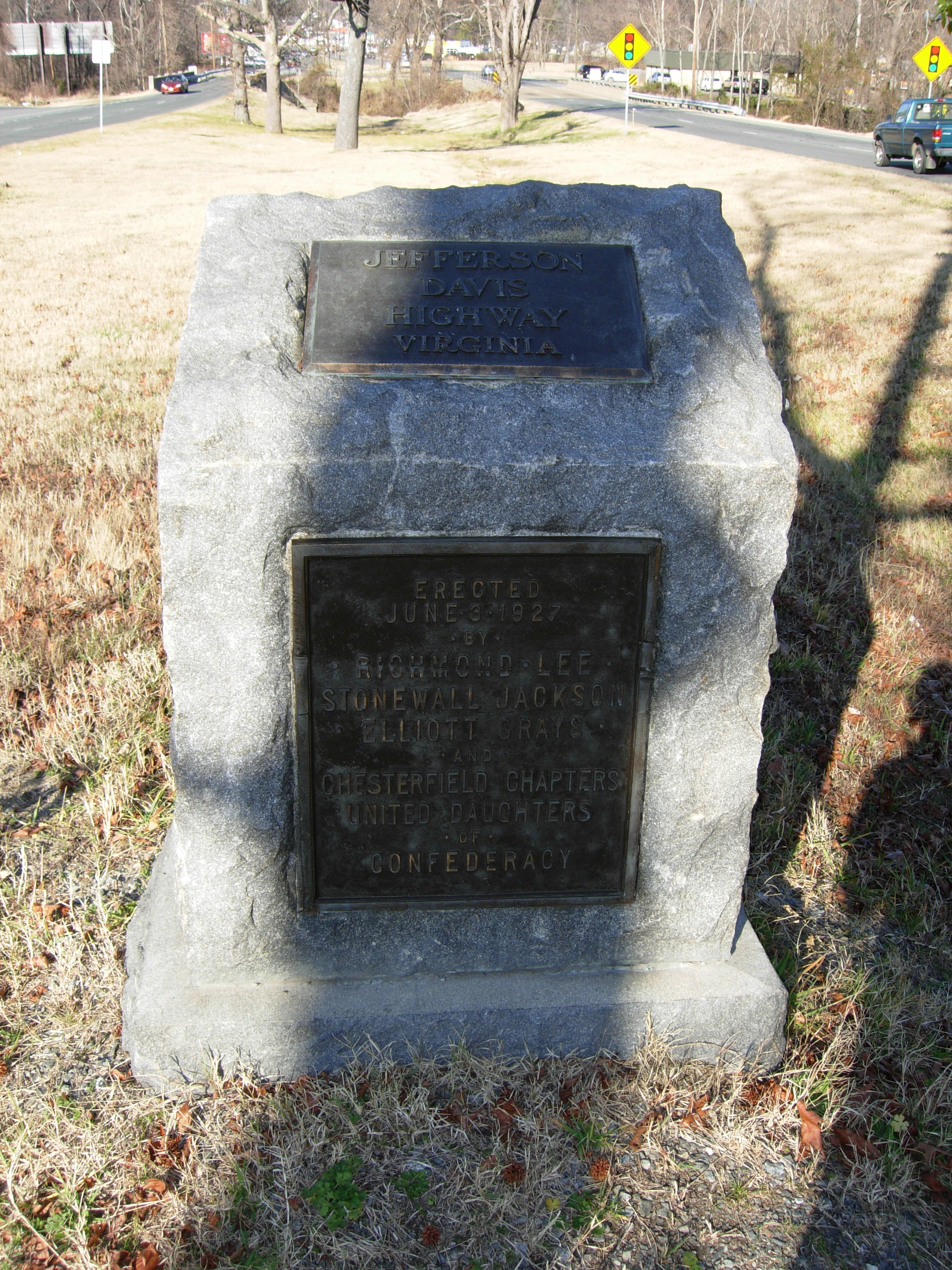

- Location within Virginia Location within the United States
- Location: 0.2 mi. E of jct. of Hillard and Brook Rds., Richmond, Virginia
- Coordinates: 37.614203°N 77.457078°W
- Area: less than one acre
- Built: 1927
- MPS: UDC Commemorative Highway Markers along the Jefferson Davis Highway in Virginia
- NRHP reference No.: 07000765
- VLR No.: 043-5329

Significant dates
- Added to NRHP: July 24, 2007
- Designated VLR: June 6, 2007

The Brook Road Marker, Jefferson Davis Highway is a commemorative marker on the Jefferson Davis Highway, in Henrico County, Virginia, outside of Richmond, Virginia. The Jefferson Davis Highway was conceived and marked by the United Daughters of the Confederacy, as a counter to the Lincoln Highway in the north, during 1913–1925. In that era, named highways were being marked as automobile travel increased, and the advent of numbered highways eventually loomed. The marker was placed in North Richmond Brook Road, south of Hilliard Road, in 1927. It is one of the earliest, out of 16, that were placed to mark the highway in Virginia by the United Daughters of the Confederacy. It is a 42-inch-high (1.1 m) gray granite stone, with a slanted top, and a bronze plaque.

It is one of a number of markers studied in a National Park Service study, UDC Commemorative Highway Markers along the Jefferson Davis Highway in Virginia.
