= Falling Creek UDC Jefferson Davis Highway Marker =

Site in Chesterfield County, Virginia

- U.S. National Register of Historic Places
- Virginia Landmarks Register
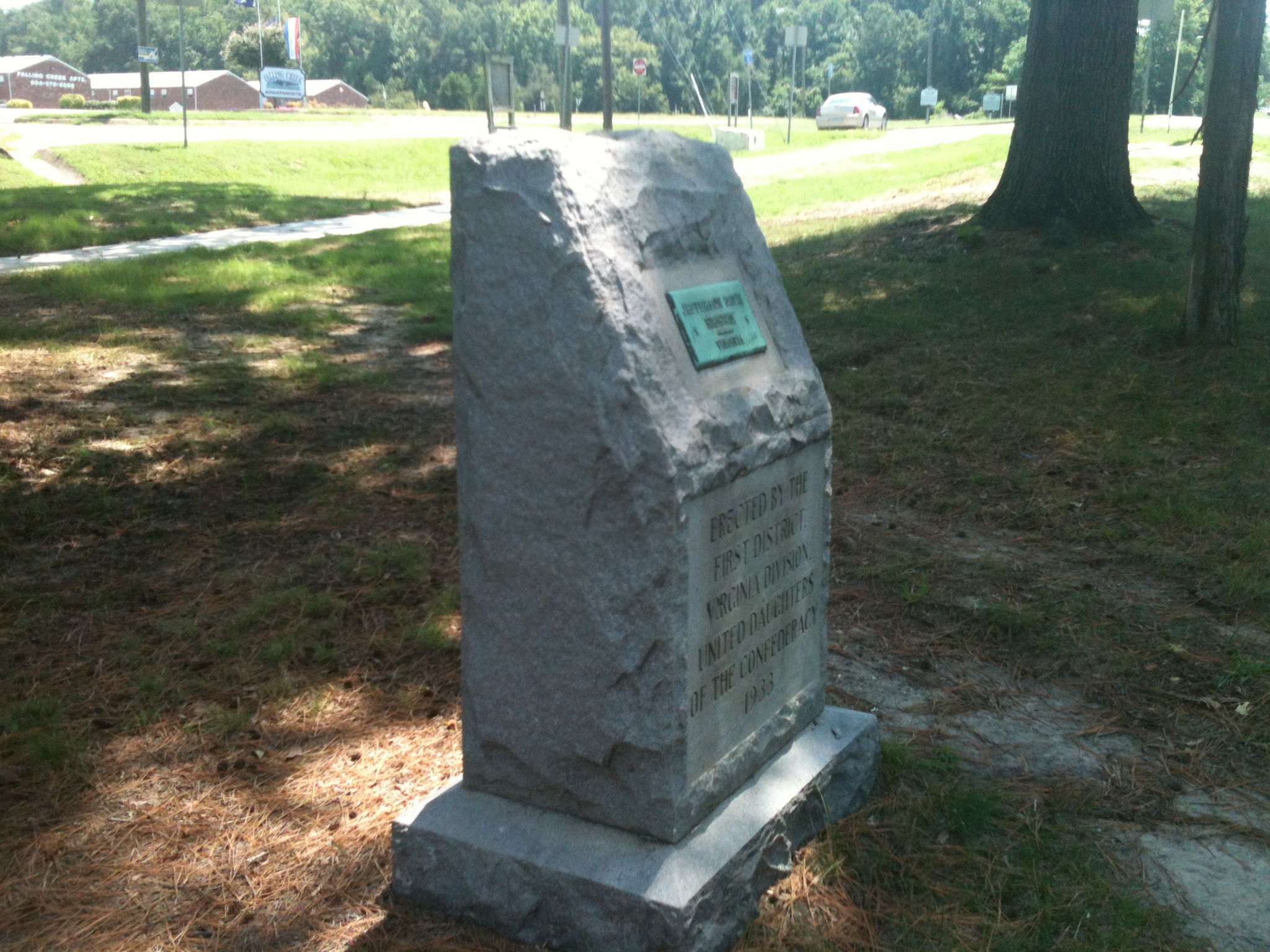

- Location within Virginia Location within the United States
- Location: US 1 at Falling Creek Wayside, near Richmond, Virginia
- Coordinates: 37°26′21″N 77°26′21″W
- Area: less than one acre
- Built: 1931
- MPS: UDC Commemorative Highway Markers along the Jefferson Davis Highway in Virginia
- NRHP reference No.: 12001220
- VLR No.: 020-5612

Significant dates
- Added to NRHP: January 23, 2013
- Designated VLR: September 30, 2010

Falling Creek UDC Jefferson Davis Highway Marker is a historic stone highway marker located near Richmond, in Chesterfield County, Virginia. It was erected in 1933, and is one of sixteen erected by the United Daughters of the Confederacy in Virginia along the Jefferson Davis Highway between 1927 and 1946. The marker is a gray granite boulder with rough-cut edges. The stone is engraved with the text “ERECTED BY THE FIRST DISTRICT VIRGINIA DIVISION UNITED DAUGHTERS OF THE CONFEDERACY 1933.” It is located in a wayside established in 1934, that provides access to the Bridge at Falling Creek. It was the first highway wayside park in Virginia.

It was listed on the National Register of Historic Places in 2013.
