= Bridge at Falling Creek =

- U.S. National Register of Historic Places
- Virginia Landmarks Register
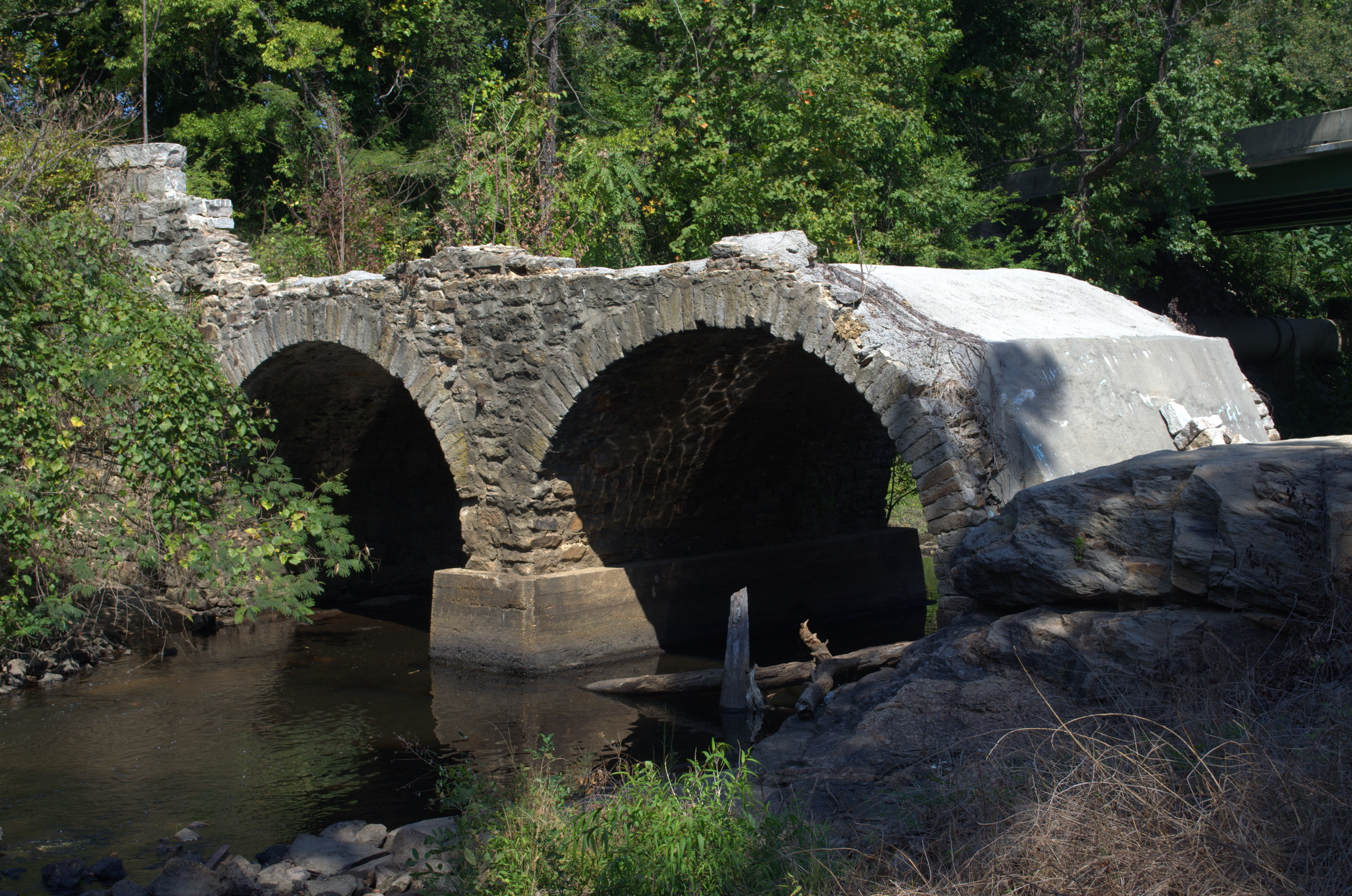
- Bridge at Falling Creek, September 2012

- Location within Virginia Location within the United States
- Location: US 1/301 at Falling Creek, near Richmond, Virginia
- Coordinates: 37°26′22″N 77°26′22″W
- Area: 2.5 acres (1.0 ha)
- Built: c. 1823
- Built by: Carter, William
- NRHP reference No.: 95001171
- VLR No.: 020-0135

Significant dates
- Added to NRHP: October 12, 1995
- Designated VLR: August 28, 1995

Bridge at Falling Creek
- Coordinates: 37°26′22″N 77°26′22″W
- Carries: US 1
- Crosses: Falling Creek, Virginia
- Locale: Chesterfield, Virginia
- Official name: Bridge at Falling Creek

History
- Opened: 1823
- Closed: 1977

Location
- Interactive map of Bridge at Falling Creek

The Bridge at Falling Creek is a historic stone arch bridge located near Richmond, in Chesterfield County, Virginia. It was built about 1823 of rough-cut, uncoursed granite. It is carried by two semicircular barrel arches with voussoirs of rough-finished granite. Its width including parapets is 24 feet (7.3 m), and its length is 148 feet (45 m). It carried the southbound lanes of U.S. Route 301 until 1977, when it was put out of service. It is accessible from a wayside that includes the Falling Creek UDC Jefferson Davis Highway Marker. The bridge was partially damaged in 2004 but still remains significant. It was listed on the National Register of Historic Places in 1995.

== See also ==
- List of bridges on the National Register of Historic Places in Virginia
