= Jefferson Davis Highway =

Historic long-distance highway in the United States

Jefferson Davis Highway
- Jefferson Davis Memorial Highway

Route information
- Existed: 1913–present

Major junctions
- East end: Arlington County, Virginia
- West end: San Diego, California

Location
- Country: United States
- States: Virginia, North Carolina, South Carolina, Georgia, Alabama, Mississippi, Louisiana, Texas, New Mexico, Arizona, California

Highway system
- Auto trails

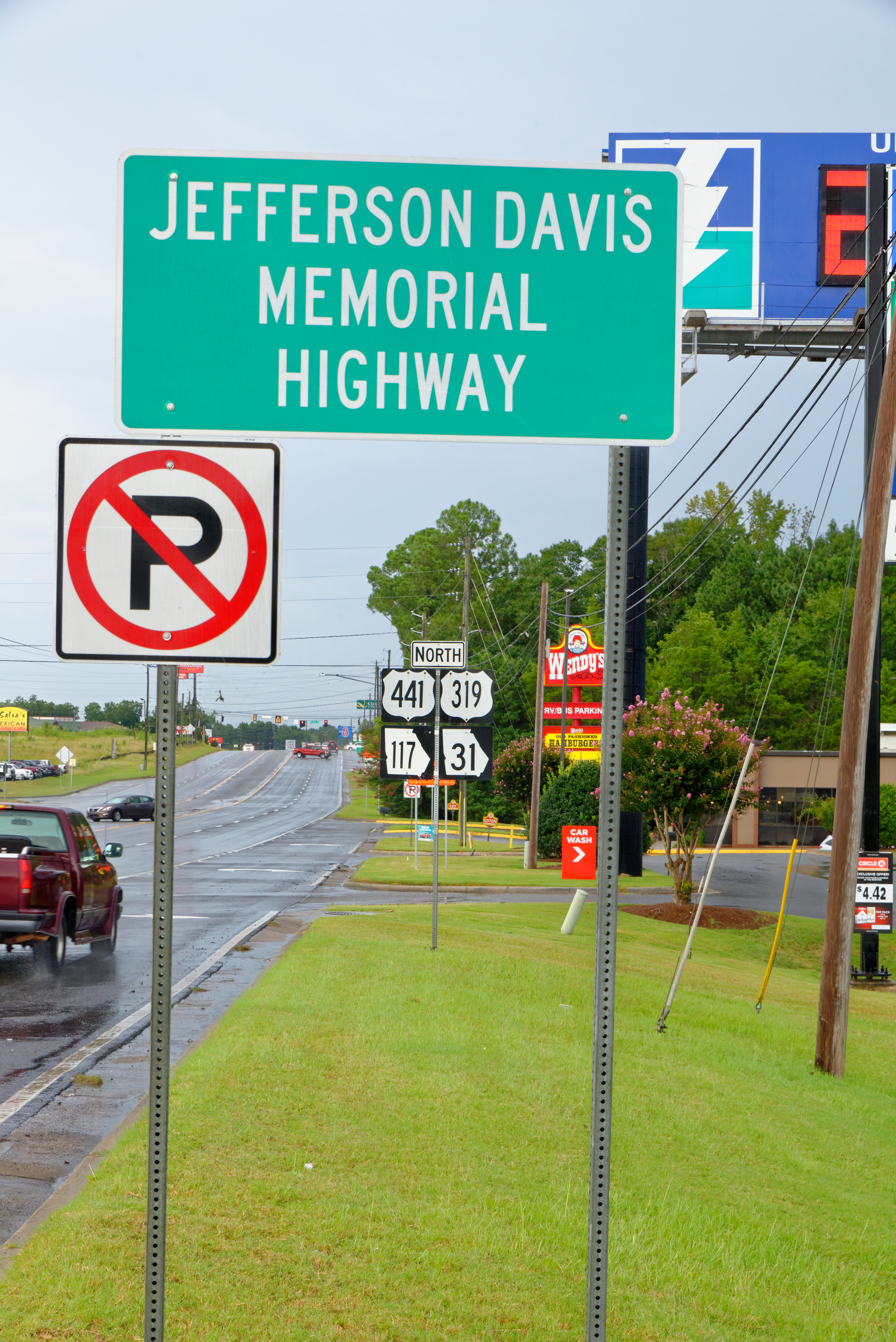
Highway in Dublin, Georgia

The Jefferson Davis Highway, also known as the Jefferson Davis Memorial Highway, was a transcontinental highway in the United States in the 1910s and 1920s that began in Arlington County, Virginia, and extended south and west to San Diego, California; it was named for Jefferson Davis, President of the Confederate States, United States senator, and Secretary of War. Because of unintended conflict between the National Auto Trail movement and the federal government, it is unclear whether it ever really existed in the complete form that its United Daughters of the Confederacy (UDC) founders originally intended.

== Conception of auto trail ==
In the first quarter of the 20th century, as the automobile gained in popularity, a system of roads began to develop informally through the actions of private interests. These were known as auto trails. They existed without the support or coordination of the federal government, although in some states, the state governments participated in their planning and development. The first of these National Auto Trails was the Lincoln Highway, which was first announced as a project in 1912.

With the need for new roads being so significant, dozens of new auto trails were begun in the decade following. One such roadway was the Jefferson Davis Highway, which was proposed by Rassie Hoskins White and sponsored by the United Daughters of the Confederacy (UDC). The UDC planned the formation of the Jefferson Davis as a road that would start in Arlington, Virginia, and travel through the southern states until its terminus at San Diego, California. More than ten years after the route-planning and marking of the Jefferson Davis on existing roadways was begun, it was announced that it would be extended north out of San Diego and go to the Canada–US border.

== End of the auto trails ==
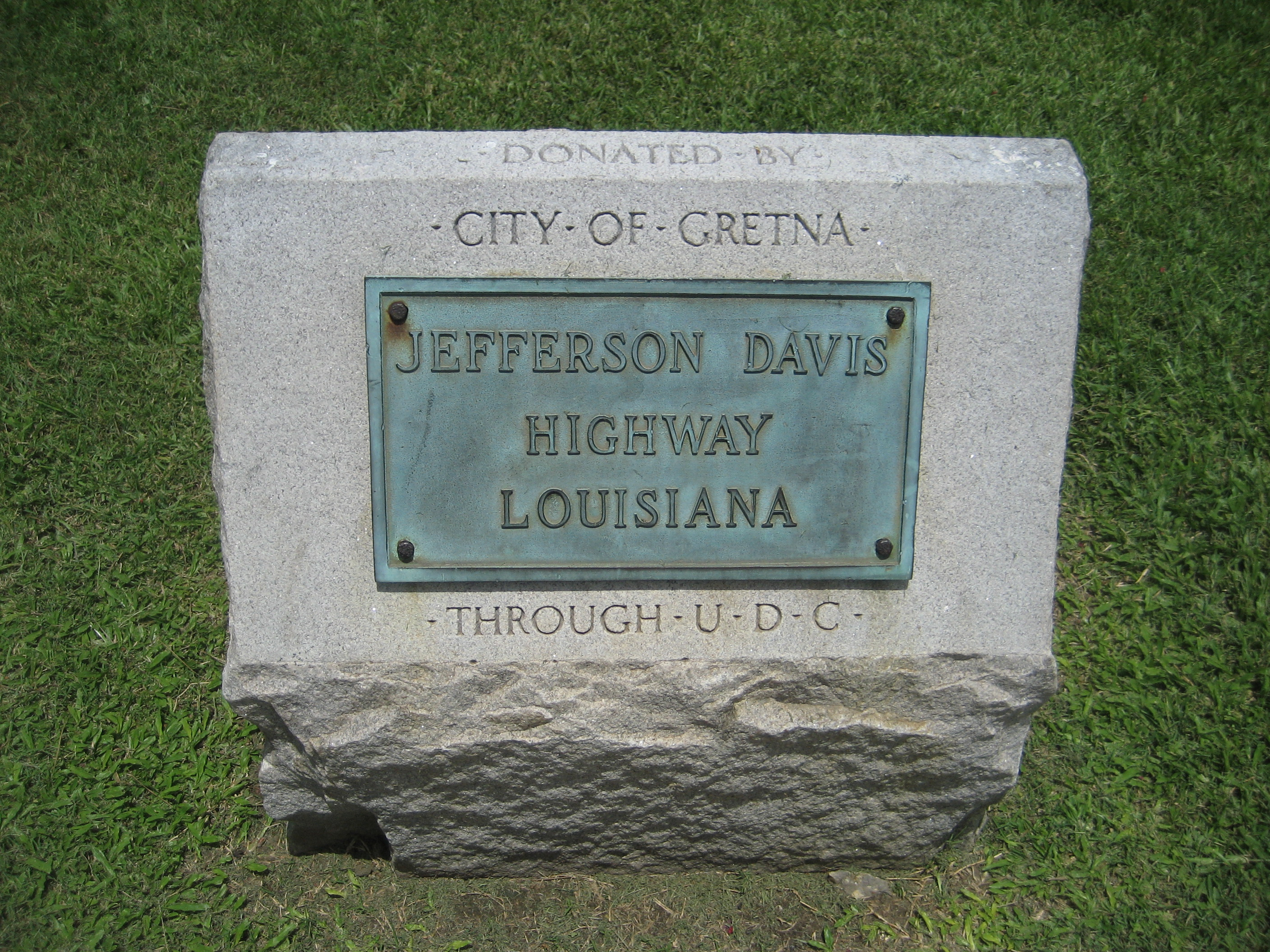
Jefferson Davis Highway marker in Gretna, Louisiana in 2008

By the mid-1920s, the informal system of national auto trails had grown cumbersome, and the federal government imposed a numbering system on the nation's highways, using even numbers for east–west routes and odd numbers for north–south routes. Rather than using a single number for each auto trail, sections of each trail were given different numerical designations. The UDC petitioned the U.S. Bureau of Public Roads to designate the Jefferson Davis as a national highway with a single number. The Bureau's reply casts doubt on whether or not the JDMH ever really existed as a transcontinental highway:

A careful search has been made in our extensive map file in the Bureau of Public Roads and three maps showing the Jefferson Davis highways have been located, but the routes on these maps are themselves different and neither route is approximately that described by you, so that I am somewhat at a loss as to just what route your constituents are interested in. For instance, there is the Jefferson Davis Memorial Highway which extends from Miami, Florida to Los Angeles (but not to San Francisco); and there is another Jefferson Davis Highway shown on the Rand-McNally maps which extends from Fairview, Kentucky the site of the Jefferson Davis monument, by a very circuitous route to New Orleans, but I find no route whatever bearing the name Jefferson Davis extending from Washington, D.C. to San Francisco. [emphasis added]

This problem may well have been the fault of the UDC themselves. In addition to the planned transcontinental route, they also designated an auxiliary route running from Kentucky to Mississippi, as well as another that ran through Georgia. These ancillary routes were intended to commemorate important venues in Davis's life, but they also contributed to the confusion of the federal government in trying to locate exactly where the Jefferson Davis highway traveled. What is known is that when numbered highways came into existence, the Jefferson Davis National Highway was split among US Route 1, US 15, US 29, US 61, US 80, US 90, US 99, US 190 and others. These numbered routes have been supplanted by the Interstate Highway System.

== Remaining portions ==
Although it may not be possible to view the entire length of the highway on a map today, many parts of it still exist, scattered across the country. This is an incomplete listing (from east to west) of some of the places today where pieces of the Jefferson Davis highway can be seen.

=== Virginia ===
The Virginia General Assembly defined the Jefferson Davis Highway in Virginia on March 17, 1922, as traveling from Arlington County at the 14th Street Bridge to Virginia's border with North Carolina, south of Clarksville. Most of this corridor was defined as US 1 and US 15 in 1926, although US 1 took a shorter route between south of McKenney and South Hill, with the Jefferson Davis Highway instead following current State Route 712 and U.S. Route 58, as well as U.S. Route 58 Business in Lawrenceville and Boydton. Additionally, Virginia State Route 110 became part of the Jefferson Davis Highway when it was constructed in 1964, thus creating an continuous route from Alexandria to Rosslyn.

The highway's original eastern terminus marker was located at the Virginia end of the 14th Street Bridge, which crosses the Potomac River from Washington, D.C. The marker was there until the 1960s, when it was moved to a nearby location for safety reasons as it was a traffic hazard. The Falling Creek and Proctor Creek highway markers in Chesterfield County, Brook Road Marker in Henrico County, Ashland Marker in Hanover County, and Elliott Grays Marker and Maury Street Marker in Richmond, Virginia are listed on the National Register of Historic Places.

Several jurisdictions in Northern Virginia changed the road's name to Richmond Highway: Fairfax County around 1970, Alexandria in January 2019, Arlington in May 2019, Prince William County in November 2020, and Stafford County in 2021 with signs replaced starting in 2022. By 2022, two portions of U.S. 1 remained designated as Jefferson Davis Highway: between and including Fredericksburg and Caroline County, and from southern Richmond through Chesterfield County.

On February 3, 2021, the Virginia House of Delegates voted to rename all remaining portions of Jefferson Davis Highway in Virginia to Emancipation Highway beginning on January 1, 2022. The bill was approved by the State Senate on February 25, 2021, and signed into law by Governor Ralph Northam. In response to the law, many localities voted to rename their portions of Jefferson Davis Highway over the course of 2021. Any portions whose names remained unchanged were legally renamed Emancipation Highway on January 1, 2022, although this only applied to Fredericksburg.

=== North Carolina ===
The Jefferson Davis Highway originally traversed through the state for 162 miles (261 km). Starting at the Virginia state line along US 15 to Sanford; then on US 1 from Sanford to the South Carolina state line. Its designation is unofficial since the North Carolina State Highway Commission, a preceding agency of what is now the North Carolina Department of Transportation (NCDOT), had denied the request on at least two occasions. However, US 1 through Lee County is officially called Jefferson Davis Highway; it was designated in 1959 by county resolution at the request of the UDC.

=== South Carolina ===
The Jefferson Davis Highway traverses through the state for 170 miles (270 km). Starting at the North Carolina state line, it follows US 1 to the Georgia state line in Augusta. Several monuments can be found along the route including in Camden and Aiken.

=== Georgia ===
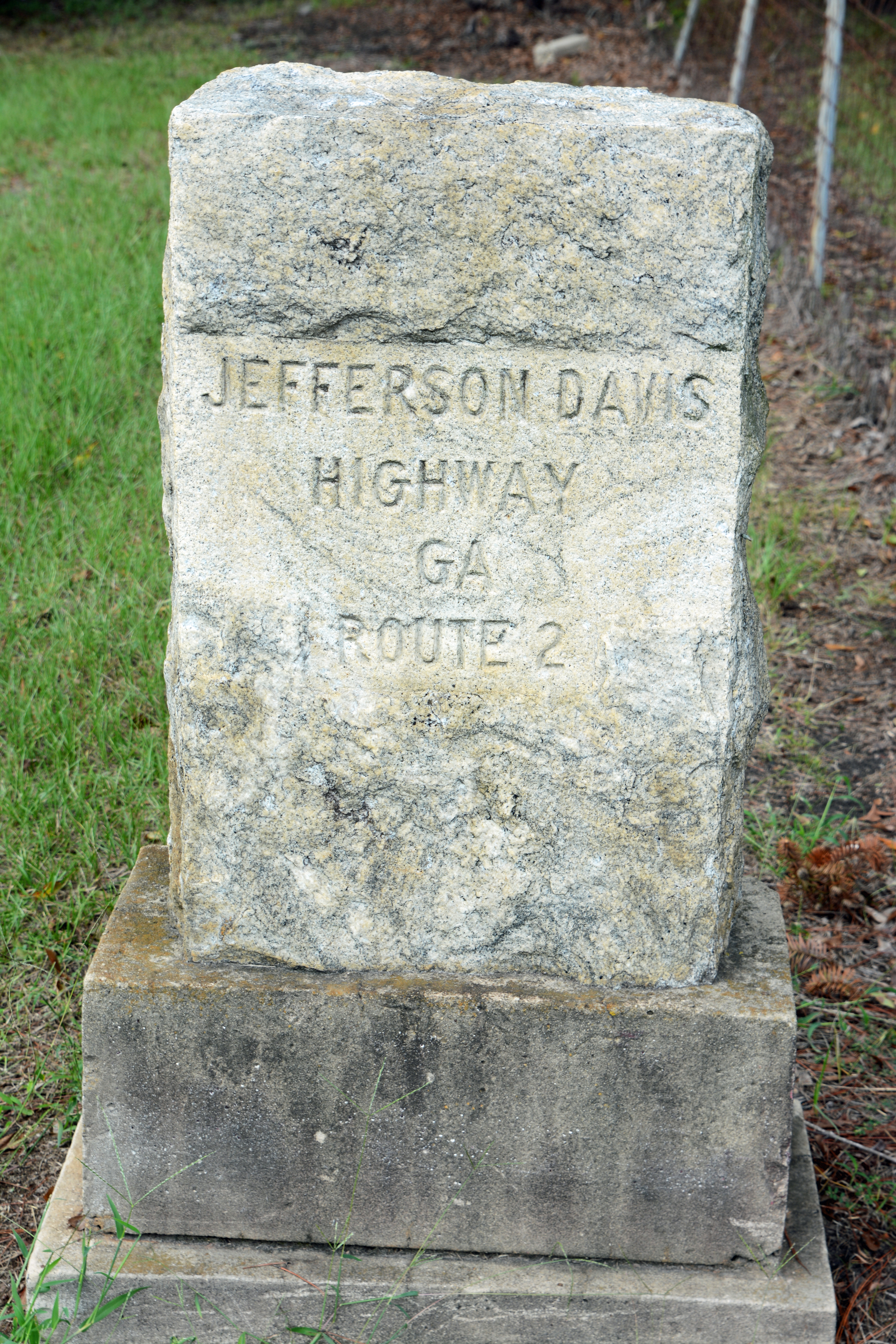
Irwin County, Georgia

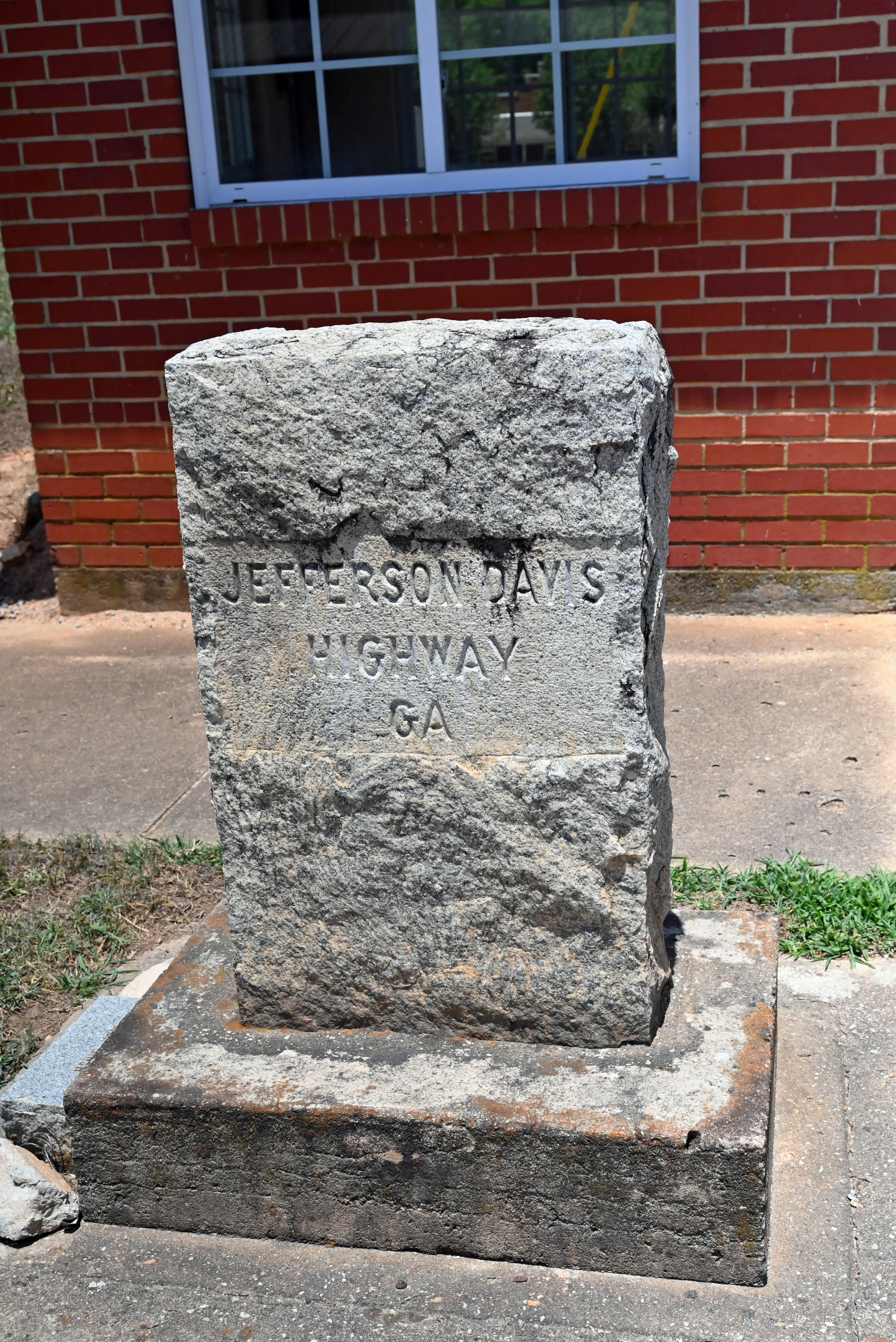
Crawfordville, Georgia

- Highway markers can still be seen in certain spots along the old main transcontinental route through the state of Georgia.
  - In Taliaferro County, in Crawfordville along US 278 (SR 12).
  - In Morgan County, in Madison along Main Street (US 278/US 441/SR 12) near its intersection with Reese Street.
  - In Walton County, also along US 278 (SR 12), approximately 890 yards (810 m) from the Morgan County line.
  - In DeKalb County, between Atlanta and Decatur, a marker stands in the traffic island at the intersection of Ponce de Leon Avenue (US 23/US 29/US 78) and East Lake Road (US 278).
  - In Coweta County, in Grantville, Georgia on Main Street just north of the railroad crossing.

Auxiliary route

- An auxiliary route through Georgia went south of the main route through Irwin County and Irwinville, where Davis was ultimately captured at the end of the Civil War. This route followed SR 32 to the west of Irwinville, into neighboring Turner County, where today SR 32 retains the official name of "Jefferson Davis Highway".
- In LaGrange, a monument exists at the northeast corner of LaGrange College, which is within 1 mile (1.6 km) of Confederate Senator Benjamin Hill's National Historical Home.
- In Wrightsville at the corner of Elm (US 319/Georgia 78) and Markus (Georgia 15)

=== Alabama ===
In Alabama, the segment of US 80 from Selma to Montgomery is the most famous part of the Jefferson Davis Memorial Highway today. On this road, Martin Luther King Jr. led the March 1965 Selma to Montgomery marches that helped prompt Congress to pass the Voting Rights Act of 1965 in August. This road also extends through eastern Montgomery and today is known as the Atlanta Highway, although interstate I-85 has replaced the route to Atlanta.

=== Mississippi ===
In Biloxi, located at 2244 Beach Boulevard in front of Beauvoir, the last home of Jefferson Davis. It is located on the coastline overlooking the Gulf of Mexico. There is also a marker in Moss Point, at 12400 US-90 at a long neglected turnout at the state line with Alabama.

=== Louisiana ===
As of 1998, there were eight markers in several places in the state. In 2008, there were six:

- Gretna, near Gretna City Hall
- New Orleans, Canal Street at North Jefferson Davis Parkway
- Baton Rouge – near the school on Government Street at Eugene Street
- Baton Rouge - 555 Government Street
- Livingston – on US-190, in Livingston, 20 miles east of Baton Rouge
- Kentwood - Louisiana Welcome Center - I-55

=== Texas ===
The original alignment of the main route traversed from Sabine River to El Paso, via Houston, Austin, San Antonio, Alpine and Van Horn. This routing today would predominantly be along US 90, with US 290 and I-35 connecting Austin. A coastal spur, branching from Houston to Brownsville, travels along US 59 and US 77. At least 18 markers are still in existence across the state. TXDOT did not officially adopt the Jefferson Davis Highway name on any of its state highways. Several of the highway markers have been removed from public property and relocated, including in San Antonio and San Marcos, with the City of Elgin voting to remove the marker there as well.

=== New Mexico ===
Parts along I-10 were signed as Jefferson Davis Highway; however, markers were removed by DOT. "Officials of the state Department of Transportation now believe they have removed the last remaining memorials to Confederate President Jefferson Davis from Interstate 10 rest areas in New Mexico."

=== Arizona ===
In 1961, the Arizona State Government passed legislation, officially designating the entire route of U.S. Route 80 in Arizona as the Jefferson Davis Highway. Some monuments displaying the name of the highway still remain along the segments of the old route (such as a roadside marker on U.S. Route 60 near Gold Canyon). The validity of the designation present day is debatable, as US 80 is no longer an active highway in Arizona. However, the Route 80 designation still exists within Arizona in other forms. One segment of US 80 still exists in the form of Arizona State Route 80. Most of former US 80 in Arizona is also signed and designated as Historic US 80.

=== California ===
The western terminus of the highway was identified by a Jefferson Davis plaque at Horton Plaza in downtown San Diego. The formal opening of the highway at this terminus was officiated by President Warren Harding. (Photographs of this event are available in the archives of the San Diego Union-Tribune and in the files of the San Diego Historical Society.)

Markers were also placed in the California municipalities of Bakersfield, Fort Tejon, Hornbrook, and Winterhaven.

The Jefferson Davis monument at Horton Plaza was removed on August 16, 2017, in the aftermath of the Unite the Right rally in Virginia. The marker in Hornbrook was removed by protesters during the George Floyd protests in June 2020.

== State and local actions ==
=== Arizona ===
On August 17, 2017, the Jefferson Davis Highway road-side marker beside U.S. Route 60 near Gold Canyon was "tarred and feathered", presumably in response to the Unite the Right rally the previous weekend in Charlottesville, Virginia. The marker is a remnant of when U.S. Route 80 previously existed over the same roadway, which was designated as the Jefferson Davis Highway by the Arizona state legislature in 1961. In response to the controversy, the Arizona Department of Transportation stated the Jefferson Davis Highway "no longer exists" within the state as US 80 was decommissioned and removed from Arizona in 1989, suggesting ADOT does not recognize the current State Route 80 as being the same highway.

On June 30, 2020, the United Daughters of the Confederacy requested state officials to return the monument marker in addition to another Confederate monument outside the State Capitol.

=== North Carolina ===
On November 6, 2020, an article from The News & Observer indicated that NCDOT was in the process of removing Jefferson Davis highway signs and markers along state-owned right-of-way. The process started in the summer of 2020, following the murder of George Floyd. The article also mentions how Wikipedia was incorrect in identifying the Jefferson Davis Highway as an official designation by the State, approved on May 28, 1955; the reference used, North Carolina Memorial Highways and other Named Facilities, published by NCDOT was in fact incorrect.

=== Virginia ===
The northeastern Virginia section of the highway approximated the route of the older Washington and Alexandria Turnpike, which received its charter from the United States Congress in 1808. A street in Crystal City once designated as "Old Jefferson Davis Highway" parallels the east side of US 1, part of which was known as Jefferson Davis Highway in the area until 2019. This street, which was the original route of the highway, now ends before reaching the 14th Street Bridge.

In 2011, the Arlington County Board voted to change the name of the street to "Long Bridge Drive" after the board's chairman stated: "I have a problem with 'Jefferson Davis' ... There are aspects of our history I'm not particularly interested in celebrating". However, the name of the county's section of Jefferson Davis Highway itself, a portion of U.S. 1 that only the Virginia General Assembly could legally rename in 2011, remained unchanged.

In 2012, the Virginia General Assembly changed its statute, granting Virginia's Commonwealth Transportation Board (CTB) the authority to change the name of a primary highway, such as Jefferson Davis Highway, that the General Assembly had originally named. In February 2016, Virginia Deputy Attorney General Jeffrey Bourne issued an advisory opinion that the City of Alexandria had the legal authority to change the name of the portion of Jefferson Davis Highway that was within the city's jurisdiction.

In September 2016, the Alexandria City Council voted unanimously to change the name of the city's portion of the highway, but did not take a vote on a new name for the road. In June 2018, the city council voted unanimously to change the road's name to Richmond Highway, the name already used in adjacent Fairfax County.

In its 2016 legislative package, the Arlington County Board asked the Virginia General Assembly to rename the portion of Jefferson Davis Highway that was within the county. However, no member of Arlington's legislative delegation offered any such legislation during the 2016 session of the General Assembly.

In 2019, Arlington County finally succeeded in changing the name of the portion of the highway within the county after Virginia Attorney General Mark Herring concluded that, in accordance with the 2012 change in the Commonwealth's statute, the CTB had the authority to change the highway's name within the county. The Arlington County Board then voted unanimously on April 25 to approve a resolution that asked the CTB to rename to Richmond Highway the 2.56-mile portion of Jefferson Davis Highway that lay within the county's borders. After receiving a letter of support from Virginia Governor Ralph Northam, the CTB voted on May 15 to change to Richmond Highway the name of the portions of U.S. Route 1 and Virginia State Route 110 within Arlington County that at the time bore the name of Jefferson Davis Highway.

On February 3, 2021, the Virginia House of Delegates voted to rename all remaining portions of Jefferson Davis Highway in Virginia to Emancipation Highway beginning on January 1, 2022. The bill was approved by the State Senate on February 25, 2021, and signed into law by Governor Northam a month later. As of January 1, 2022, all remaining portions of Jefferson Davis Highway in Virginia have been renamed.

=== Washington ===
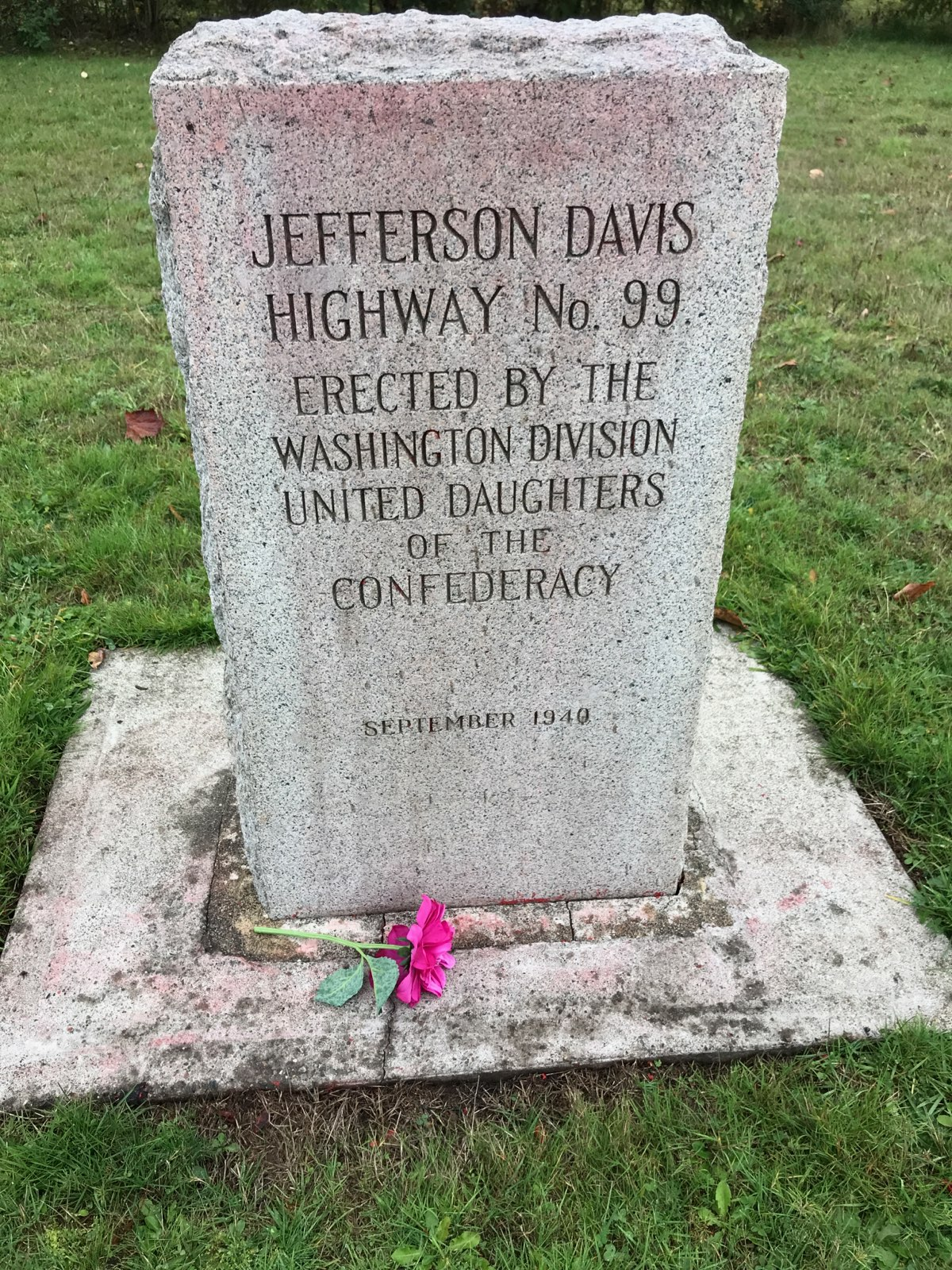
Jefferson Davis Highway Marker from Blaine Washington, now displayed at Jefferson Davis Park outside Ridgefield, Washington

In 1939, the Washington State Legislature proposed naming U.S. Route 99 as the "Jefferson Davis Highway", making it the final component of the Jefferson Davis Memorial Highway, but it was never made official.

In 1998, officials of the city of Vancouver removed a marker of the Jefferson Davis Highway and placed it in a cemetery shed in an action that several years later became controversial. The marker was subsequently moved twice, and eventually was placed alongside Interstate 5 on private land (Jefferson Davis Park) purchased for the purpose of giving the marker a permanent home.

The marker stone in Blaine, Washington, was removed in 2002 through the efforts of State Representative Hans Dunshee and city officials, and after it was discovered that the highway was never officially designated by the state to memorialize Davis. Both markers now rest in the Sons of Confederate Veterans-owned Jefferson Davis Park near Ridgefield, adjacent to I-5. In 2002, the Washington House of Representatives unanimously approved a bill that would have removed Davis's name from the road. However, a committee of the state's senate subsequently killed the proposal.

In March 2016, the Washington State Legislature unanimously passed a joint memorial that asked the state transportation commission to designate what was left of old U.S. Route 99, Washington State Route 99, "William P. Stewart Memorial Highway" to honor an African-American volunteer during the Civil War who later became a pioneer of the town and city of Snohomish. In May 2016, the transportation commission agreed to the renaming.

== See also ==
- United States Numbered Highway System
- List of Confederate monuments and memorials
- List of memorials to Jefferson Davis
- Removal of Confederate monuments and memorials
