= Maury Street Marker, Jefferson Davis Highway =

- U.S. National Register of Historic Places
- Virginia Landmarks Register
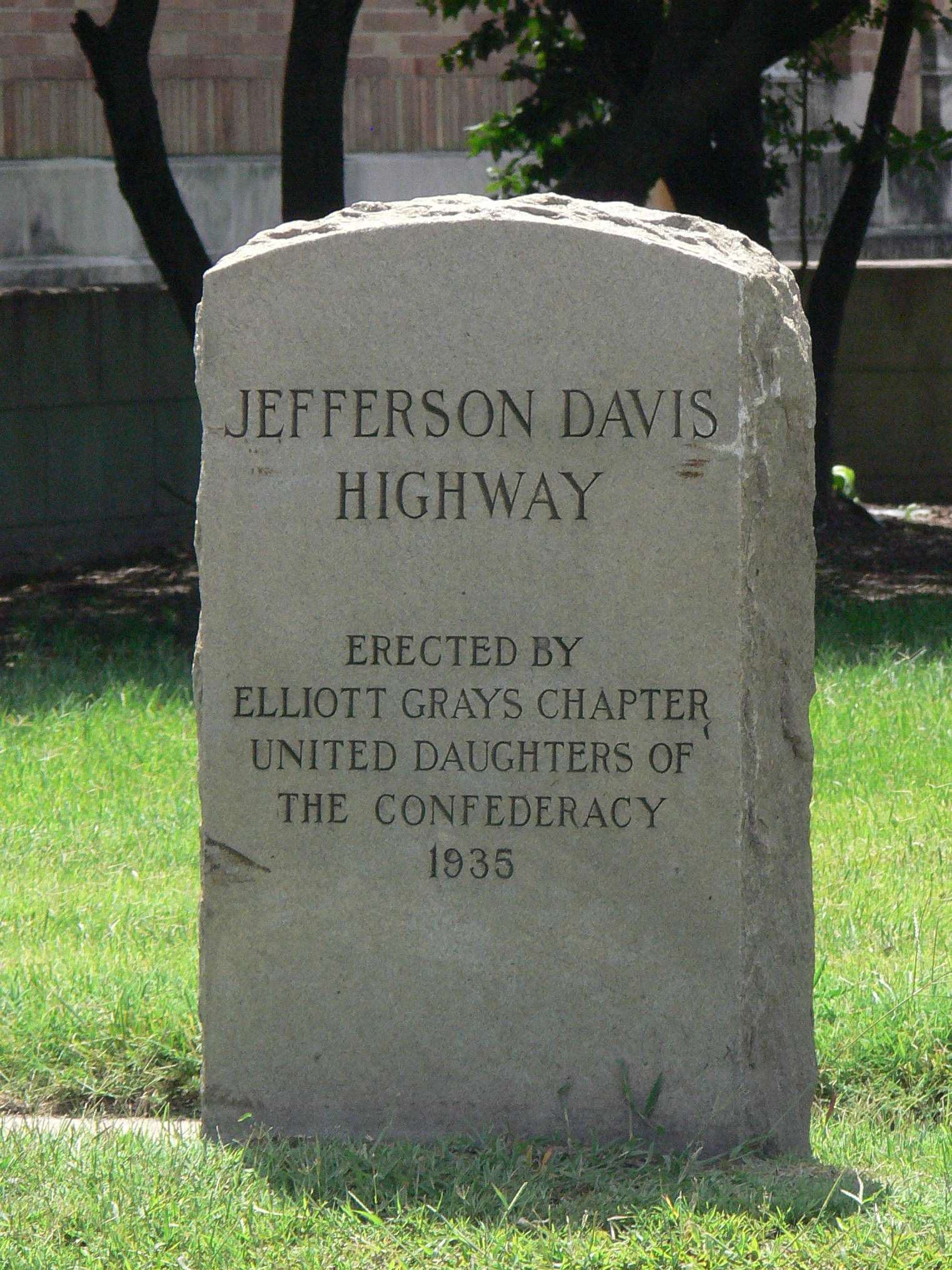
- Maury Street Marker, Jefferson Davis Highway, July 2011

- Location within Virginia
- Location: Jct. of Maury St. and US 1 (Jefferson Davis Highway), Richmond, Virginia
- Coordinates: 37°30′45″N 77°26′55″W
- Area: less than one acre
- Built: 1935
- MPS: UDC Commemorative Highway Markers along the Jefferson Davis Highway in Virginia
- NRHP reference No.: 04000572
- VLR No.: 127-5833

Significant dates
- Added to NRHP: June 2, 2004
- Designated VLR: March 17, 2004

Maury Street Marker, Jefferson Davis Highway is a historic route marker located on U.S. Route 1, or Jefferson Davis Highway, in Richmond, Virginia. It was erected in 1935, by the United Daughters of the Confederacy (UDC). It is one of 16 erected in Virginia along the Jefferson Davis Highway between 1927 and 1947. The marker is an inscribed granite slab with smooth flat faces and rough-cut edges. It measures 45 inches (110 cm) tall, 25 inches (64 cm) wide and 9 inches (23 cm) thick. The stone is engraved with the text "Jefferson Davis Highway Erected by Elliott Grays Chapter United Daughters of the Confederacy 1935".

It was listed on the National Register of Historic Places in 2004.

== See also ==
- Auto trail
- List of memorials to Jefferson Davis
