= Elliott Grays Marker-Jefferson Davis Highway =

Site in Richmond, Virginia

- U.S. National Register of Historic Places
- Virginia Landmarks Register
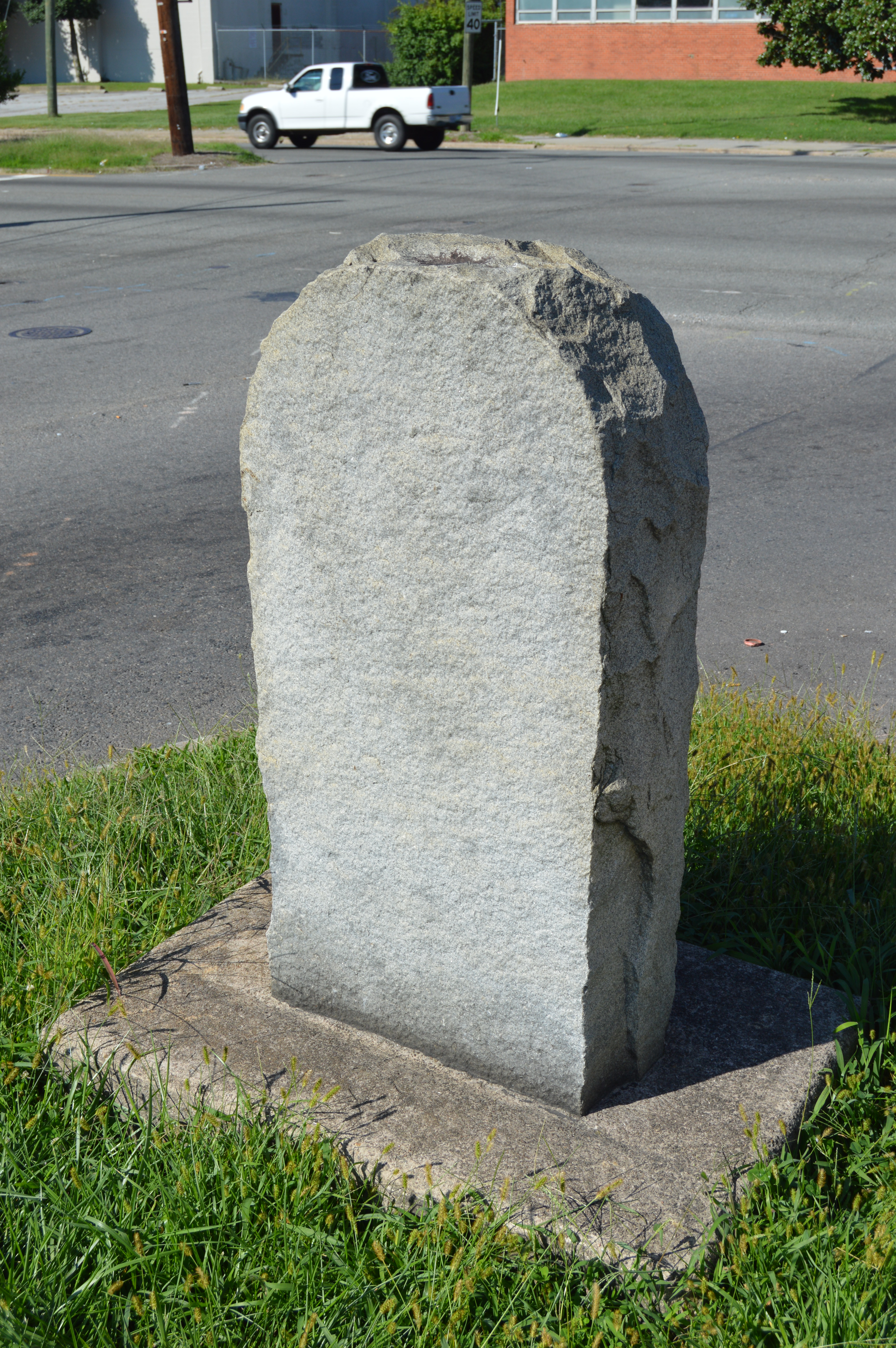
- Rear of the marker

- Location within Virginia Location within the United States
- Location: Jct. of Ingram Ave., and US 1 (Jefferson Davis Highway), Richmond, Virginia
- Coordinates: 37.503358°N 77.446610°W
- Area: Less than 1 acre (0.40 ha)
- Built: 1929
- MPS: UDC Commemorative Highway Markers along the Jefferson Davis Highway in Virginia
- NRHP reference No.: 06000748
- VLR No.: 127-5837

Significant dates
- Added to NRHP: August 31, 2006
- Designated VLR: June 8, 2006

Elliott Grays Marker-Jefferson Davis Highway is a historic route marker located on U.S. Route 1, or Jefferson Davis Highway, in Richmond, Virginia. It was erected in 1929, by the United Daughters of the Confederacy. It is one of 16 erected in Virginia along the Jefferson Davis Highway between 1927 and 1947. The marker is an inscribed granite slab with smooth flat faces and rough-cut edges. It measures 47 inches tall, 25 inches wide and 12 inches thick. The stone is engraved with the text "Jefferson Davis Highway This tree marks the site of Battery 17 of the inner defenses of Richmond, 1862-65, and is planted in soil taken from battlefields A memorial to Confederate Soldiers by the Elliott Grays Chapter U.D.C. 1929."

It was listed on the National Register of Historic Places in 2006.

The website Roadside America calls this the "Highway Marker to a Dead Confederate Tree", pointing out that the tree mentioned in the inscription died decades ago.
