= Proctor Creek, Jefferson Davis Highway Marker =

Site in Chesterfield County, Virginia

- U.S. National Register of Historic Places
- Virginia Landmarks Register
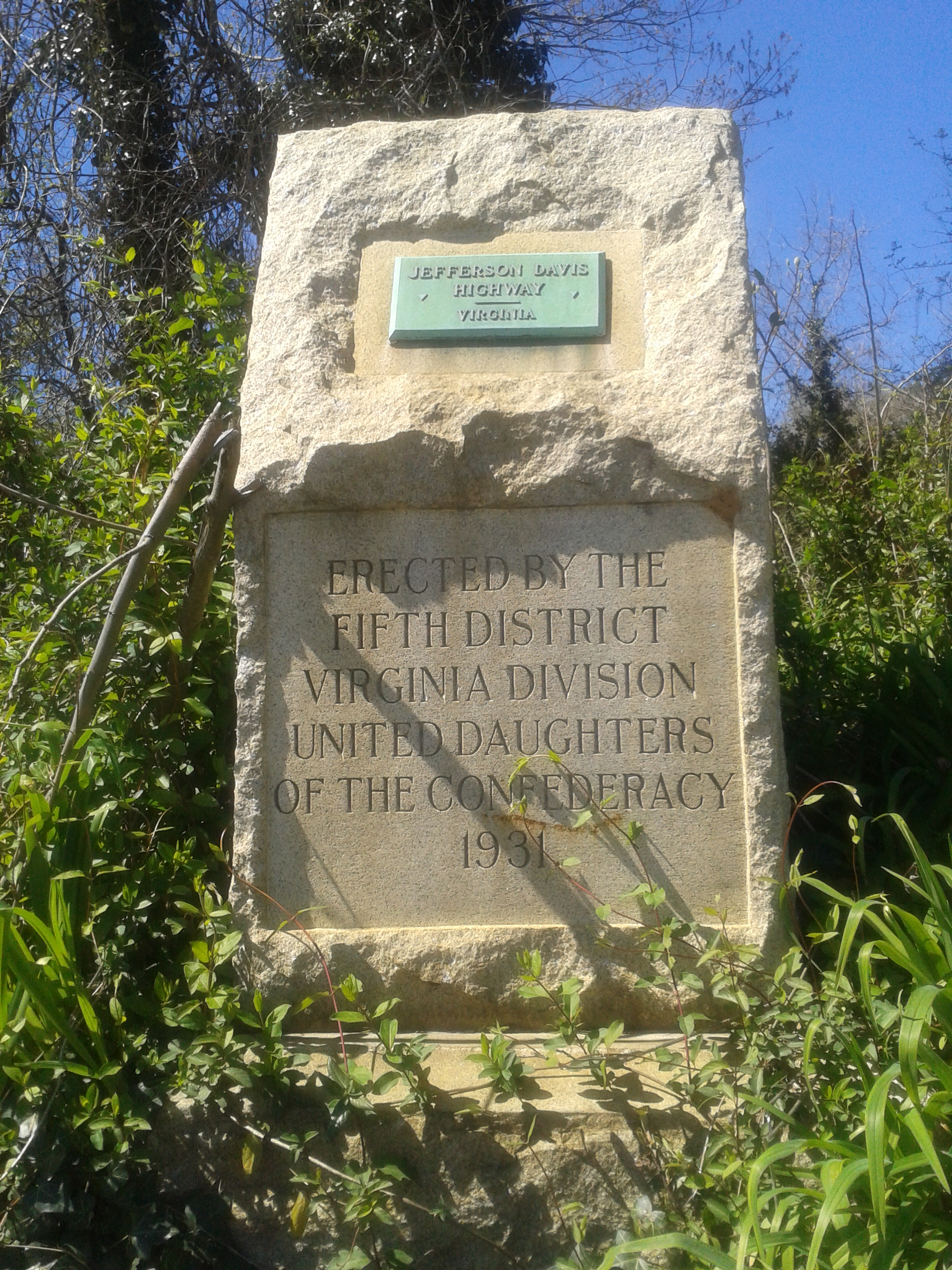
- The marker in April 2017

- Location within Virginia Location within the United States
- Location: 9300 Block of Jefferson Davis Hwy., near Richmond, Virginia
- Coordinates: 37°23′55″N 77°25′51″W
- Area: less than one acre
- Built: 1931
- MPS: UDC Commemorative Highway Markers along the Jefferson Davis Highway in Virginia
- NRHP reference No.: 08000892
- VLR No.: 020-0561

Significant dates
- Added to NRHP: September 12, 2008
- Designated VLR: June 19, 2008

Proctor Creek, Jefferson Davis Highway Marker is a historic stone highway marker located near Richmond, in Chesterfield County, Virginia. It was erected in 1931, and is one of sixteen erected by the United Daughters of the Confederacy in Virginia along the Jefferson Davis Highway between 1927 and 1946. The marker is a gray granite boulder with rough-cut edges. The stone is engraved with the text "ERECTED BY THE FIFTH DISTRICT VIRGINIA DIVISION UNITED DAUGHTERS OF THE CONFEDERACY 1931."

It was listed on the National Register of Historic Places in 2008.
