= Jefferson Davis Park =

Private park in Ridgefield, Washington

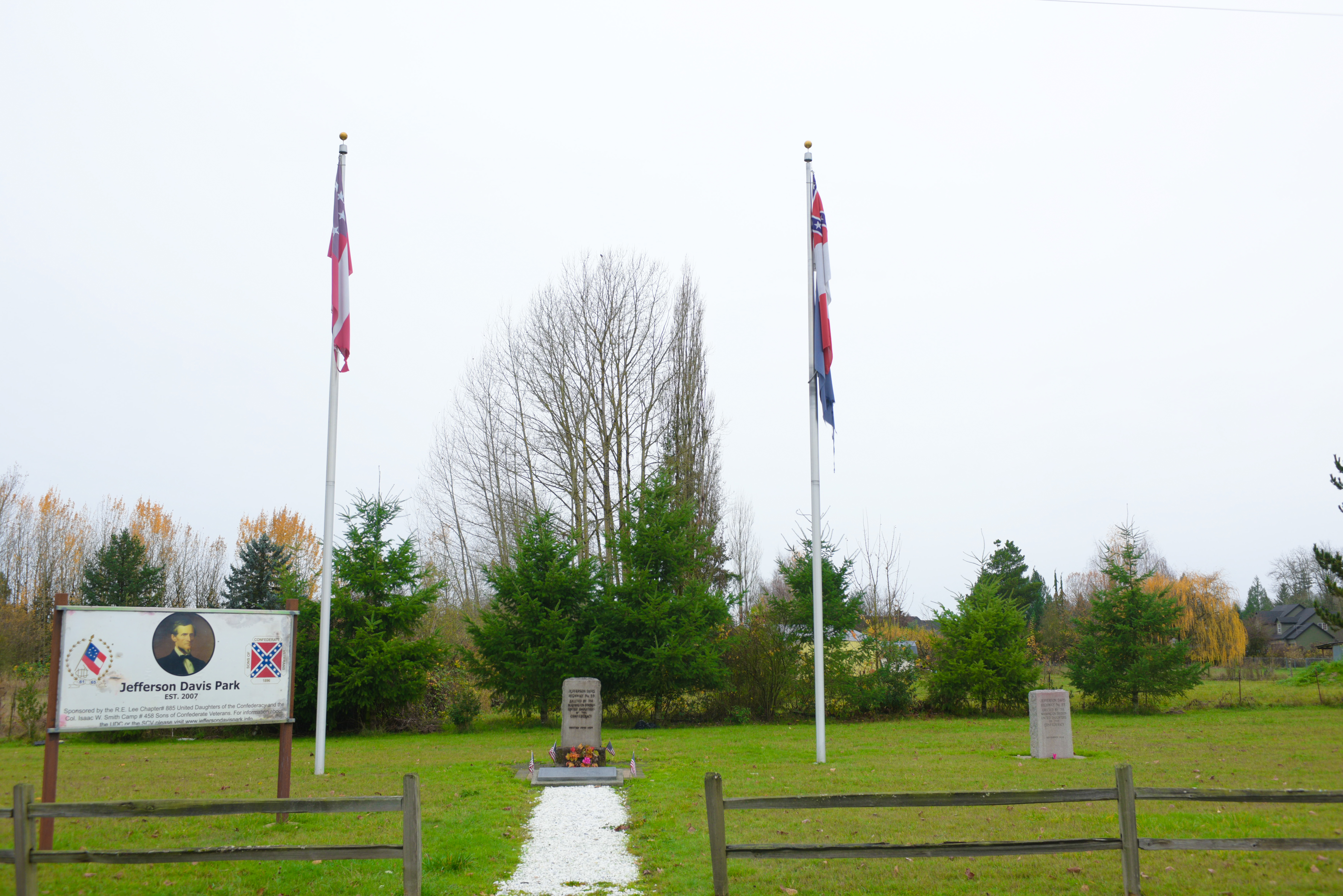
- Jefferson Davis Park
- Interactive map of Jefferson Davis Park
- Type: Roadside park, Memorial park
- Location: Ridgefield, Washington, U.S.
- Coordinates: 45°47′43″N 122°40′39″W
- Operator: Sons of Confederate Veterans, United Daughters of the Confederacy
- Open: 24 hours
- Status: open
- Website: scvpacnw.wordpress.com/jefferson-davis-park/

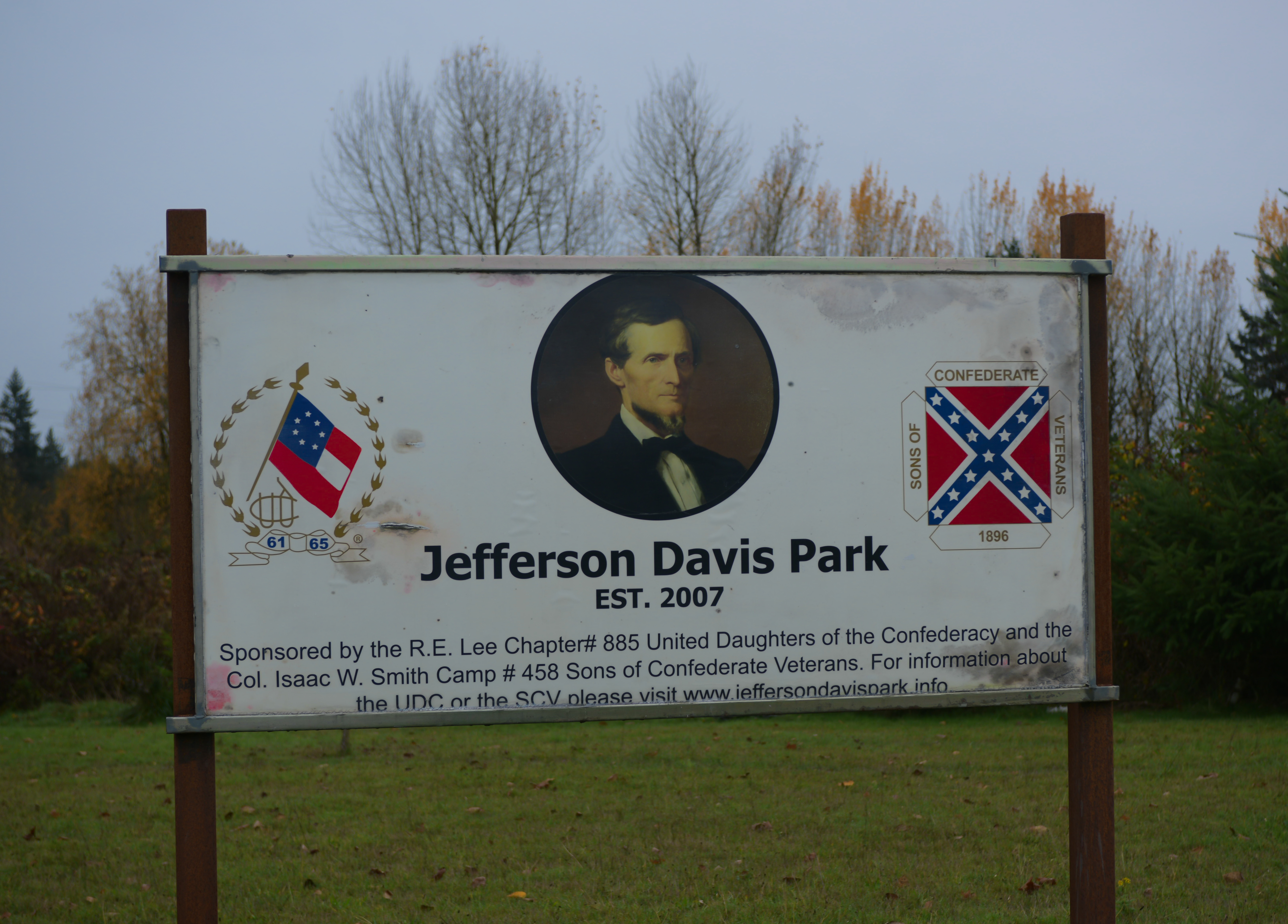
Months after the August 2017 vandalism

Jefferson Davis Park is a private park located outside Ridgefield, Washington, in the southwestern portion of the state. The granite markers of the unofficial (in Washington) Jefferson Davis Memorial Highway are at the center of the park surrounded by Confederate flags. Operated by the Pacific Northwest chapters of the United Daughters of the Confederacy and the Sons of Confederate Veterans, the park commemorates Jefferson Davis, the President of the Confederate States of America.

The park is billed by the creators as "a pleasant and honorable tribute" to Davis. For many in the area, it is divisive, being described as everything from a "roadside abomination" to "a touching experience." The park has been controversial since it was created, having been vandalized repeatedly. The NAACP called for its flags to be removed. In the aftermath of the white nationalist Unite the Right rally in August 2017, a local Antifa group took credit for vandalizing the markers, and there has been a nationwide call for removal of such Confederate monuments.

== History ==
When the Northwest chapter of Sons of Confederate Veterans failed to keep the Vancouver, Washington marker stone on public property in 2006, it purchased in 2007 a plot of land adjacent to the city of Ridgefield, Washington, just off the busy Interstate 5, for $15,000. Framing the Vancouver stone marker honoring Jefferson Davis, three flags of the Confederate States of America fly: the first and the third versions of the Confederate States flags and the unofficial Bonnie Blue Flag. The opening dedication was in April, 2008, and several versions of the Confederate flag fly over the marker stones.

The efforts to remove the other stone marker from Blaine, Washington, began in 2002 through the efforts of State Representative Hans Dunshee, after it was discovered that the highway was never officially designated to memorialize Davis by the State. This stone later was relocated to the park and is still there.

== Jefferson Davis Highway markers ==
In 1913, the Daughters of the Confederacy began a project of dedicating a route across the Southern United States as "Jefferson Davis Highway" and this was later extended to include U.S. Route 99, running up and down the West Coast. Stone markers at both ends of Washington State's portion of U.S. Route 99, designating the Jefferson Davis Highway, were erected in 1940 by the Daughters of the Confederacy with unofficial State approval. The marker stones were removed from public land, and their fate was in question until the Sons of the Confederacy bought land for the Park.

In March 2016, the Washington State Legislature unanimously passed a joint memorial that asked the state transportation commission to designate what was left of U.S. Route 99, Highway 99, as the "William P. Stewart Memorial Highway" to honor an African-American volunteer during the Civil War who later became a pioneer of the town and city of Snohomish. In May 2016, the transportation commission agreed to the renaming.

=== Vancouver, Washington marker stone ===
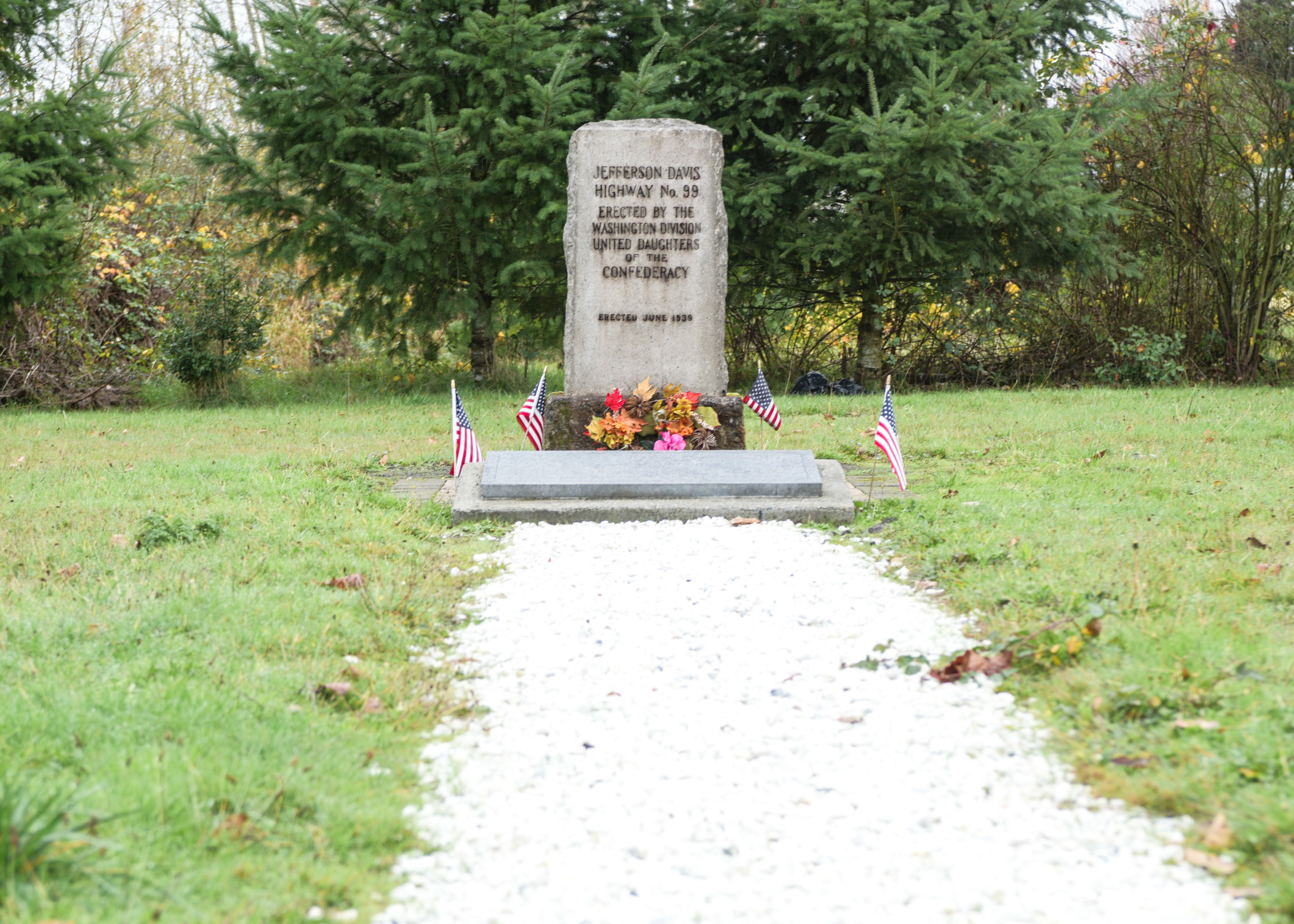
Jefferson Davis Highway, Vancouver marker stone

In 1998, a city of Vancouver official quietly removed the marker of the Jefferson Davis Highway, from near Covington House at the north end of Main Street and had it placed in a cemetery shed, in an action that four years later became controversial. The marker was subsequently moved twice, and eventually was placed in Jefferson Davis Park with the intention, on the part of the Park owners, of giving the marker a permanent home. One of those moves included an installation at the Clark County Historical Museum in 2002. Also in 2002, a petition for its inclusion on the county's historical register was approved. The petition was then re-approved by the commission in 2007, when it moved to its current site. A decision was made by the preservation commission on October 3, 2017, to remove the marker from the historical register.

=== Blaine, Washington marker stone ===
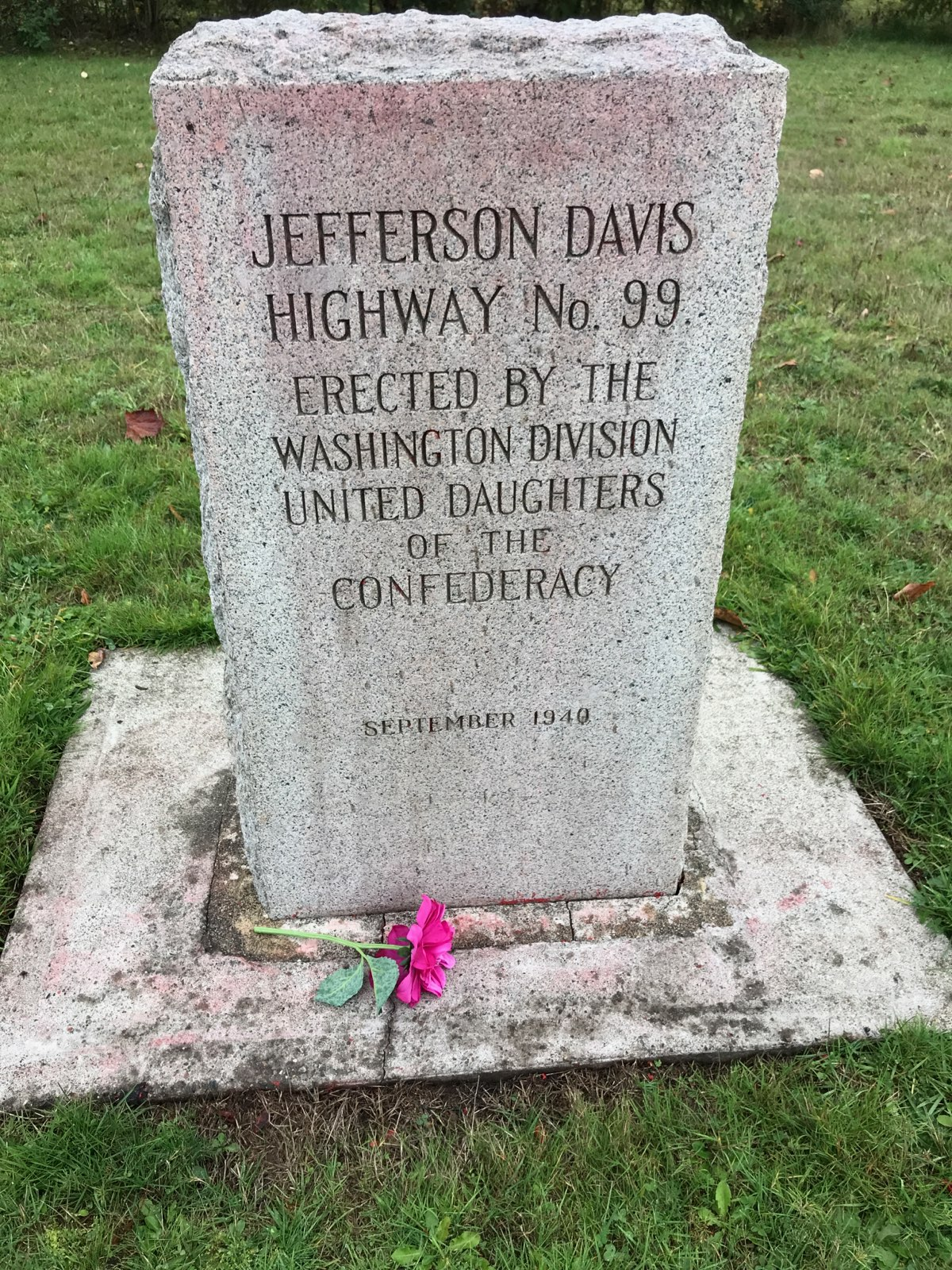
Jefferson Davis Highway, Blaine marker stone

The marker stone in Blaine, Washington was removed in 2002 through the efforts of State Representative Hans Dunshee and city officials, after it was discovered that the highway was never officially designated to memorialize Davis by the state. Both markers now are located in Jefferson Davis Park. In 2002, the Washington House of Representatives unanimously approved a bill that would have removed Davis's name from the road. A Senate committee subsequently killed the proposal.

== Controversy ==
In 2002, this controversy made national news as State Representative Dunshee proposed the renaming, while Representative Thomas M. Mielke opposed it. This disagreement over the marker stones would not be settled until 2016 with the 'official' renaming of what was left of U.S. Route 99, in Washington State.

Within months of the park's dedication in the Spring of 2008, it was vandalized; the billboard was torn down and thrown into a nearby creek. This billboard was again vandalized in 2017 and in April 2018.

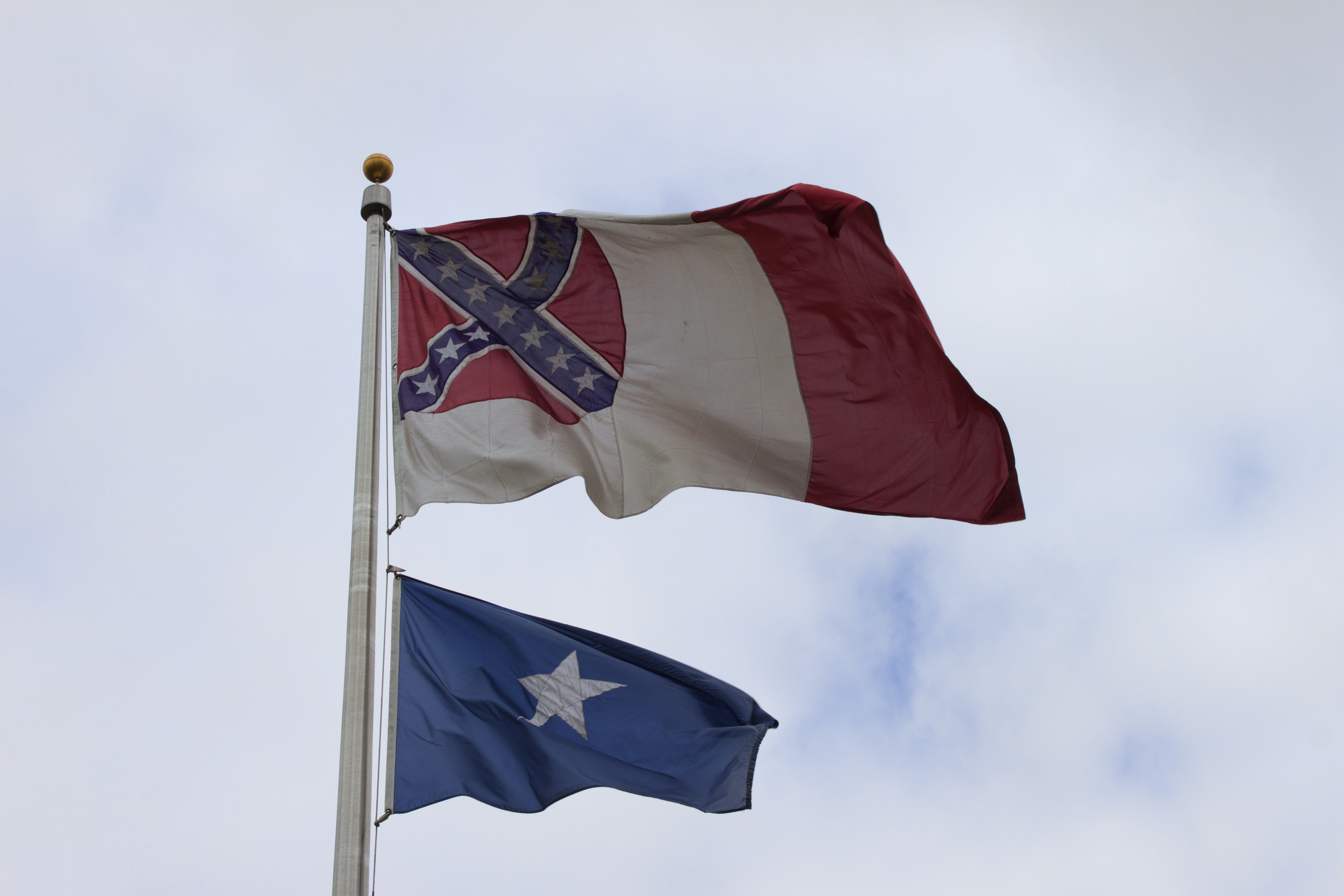
3rd Flag of the Confederacy and the Bonnie Blue Flag at the park, 2018

Calls for the removal of the flags began in 2015, after the Charleston church shooting, by Rev. Marva Edwards, the president of Vancouver's NAACP chapter. Even though the markers and flags are located on private property, they are and were intended to be highly visible (to all cars travelling Interstate 5). Their visibility, and events in other parts of the nation regarding Confederate memorials, still make these symbols a local focus of strong emotions, especially in the aftermath of the white nationalist Unite the Right rally August 11–12, 2017. On August 17, 2017, the stones were vandalized, with one marker covered in black paint, the other in red. Antifa activists from nearby Portland took credit for the vandalism. The local Division Commander of the Sons of Confederate Veterans spoke of bringing in private security to prevent more vandalism; their leadership said they have received death threats over the monuments, "amid a tide of calls to remove Confederate monuments in the wake of Charlottesville violence of August, 2017".

The nearby town of Ridgefield, originally "Union Ridge", has no historical connection with the Confederacy or Jefferson Davis, but as Mayor Ron Onslow said, "We get calls about it every time the Confederacy comes up". Although Jefferson Davis Park has a Ridgefield address, "It's not in our city, so we have no say over it. We're not against history, but there is no history of this in Ridgefield", Onslow said in requesting the Vancouver highway marker stone, be removed from the Clark County Historical Register. On October 2, 2017, the commissioners of the city of Ridgefield officially and unanimously asked the Clark County Historic Preservation Commission to remove the Jefferson Davis Highway marker, from Vancouver, Washington, from its local heritage list, which the Commission did.

In January 2018, the flags were cut down and the park vandalized for the third time since August 2017, when the locks were cut and the flags removed, as controversy continues around the park. The Sons of Confederate Veterans are planning to replace the flags and are looking into options for additional security. Garth McKinney, first lieutenant commander of the Pacific Northwest Division of the Sons of Confederate Veterans, which maintains the site, stated they don't plan to move the site from the private property outside Ridgefield, and are looking around the state for even more sites where they can put up more flagpoles.

== See also ==
- List of Confederate monuments and memorials
- List of memorials to Jefferson Davis
- Modern display of the Confederate flag
- Neo-Confederate
- Racism in the United States
