= Frank Teich =

American sculptor (1856–1939)

- Born: September 22, 1856; Neundorf bei Lobenstein, Germany
- Died: January 27, 1939 (aged 82); Llano, Texas, U.S.
- Education: University of Erlangen-Nuremberg
- Occupation: Sculptor
- Spouse: Elvina Lang
- Children: 3 daughters
- Parent(s): Frederick Teich; Catherine Horn

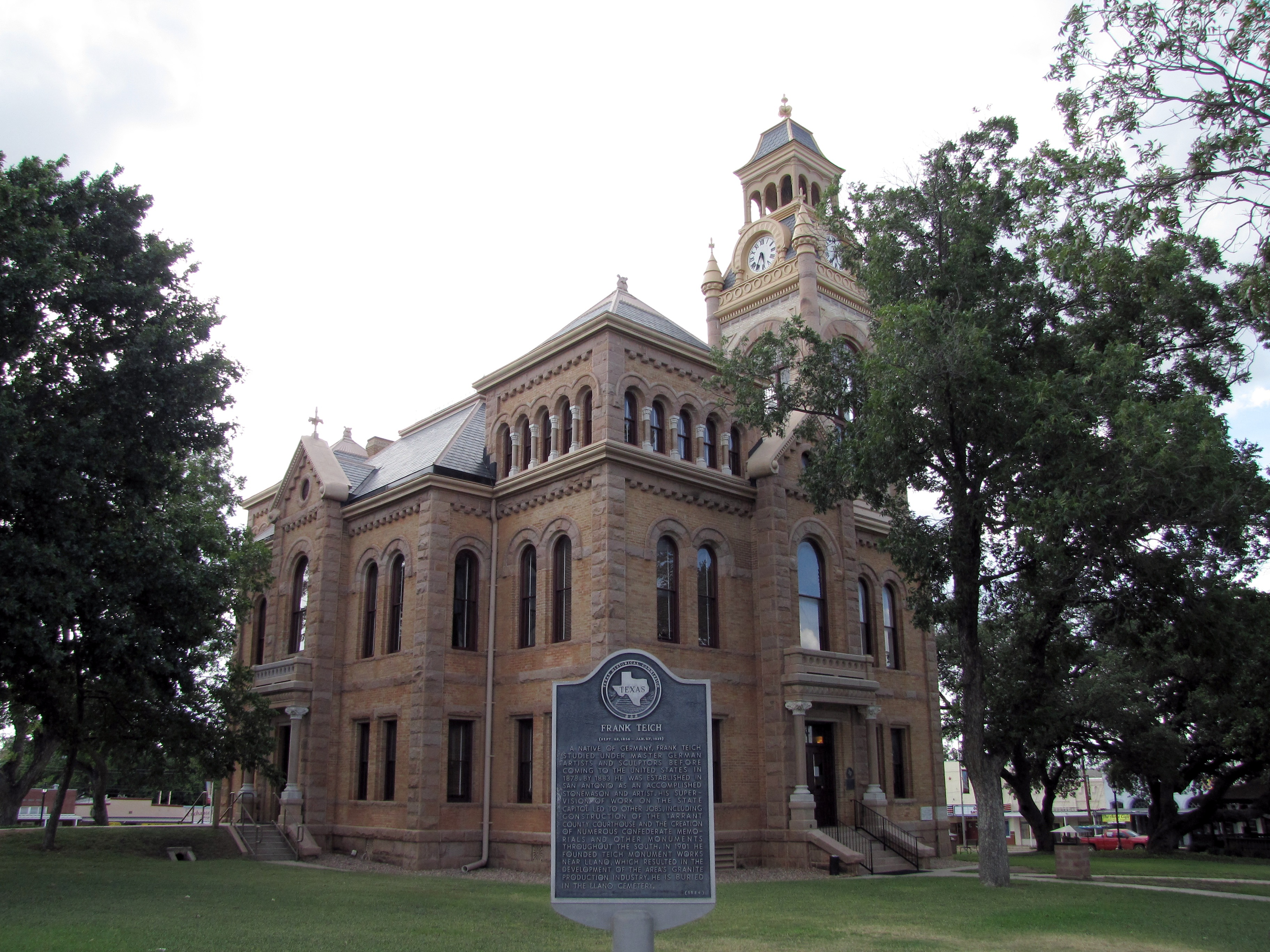

Frank Teich (September 22, 1856 – January 27, 1939) was a German-born American sculptor, stone carver, and businessman, often referred to as the father of the Texas granite industry.

== Early life and education ==
Teich was born on September 22, 1856, in Neundorf bei Lobenstein, Germany. He graduated from the University of Erlangen-Nuremberg, and he studied drawing, design and stone carving under Johannes Schilling, He immigrated to the United States in 1878, moving to Chicago a year later.

== Career ==
Teich was placed in charge of the stone carving for the Cook County Courthouse. He left Chicago and settled in Texas in 1883, where he remained for the rest of his life. In Austin, Teich received the contract as superintendent of the granite cutting on the new capitol building, designed by Elijah E. Myers. Teich designed the Volunteer Firemen Monument that was installed on the capitol grounds in 1896. After receiving the commission to execute the Confederate Soldiers Monument on the capitol grounds Teich contacted the Roman Bronze Works, who in turn assigned an employee of theirs, Pompeo Coppini, to San Antonio, where Teich's studio was located, to assist in the making of the monument. Roman Bronze Works got the contract for five bronze figures, but they never got Coppini back – he remained in San Antonio for the rest of his life. Teich also executed the Confederate Soldiers Memorial (San Antonio, Texas) which was designed by Louisiana artist Elizabeth Montgomery. This Memorial is owned by the United Daughters of the Confederacy, along with the plot of land that it sits upon in the city's downtown Travis Park. The Memorial has since been removed by the City Council to an undisclosed location.

Around 1900, Teich discovered a large outcrop of granite near Llano, Texas. It was his exploitation of that resource that resulted in his being referred to as "the father of the Texas granite industry." Since Teich supplied both statues and the granite bases that statues by other artists are mounted on, it is sometimes difficult to know for sure what might be his work or someone else's.

Much of Teich's sculptural output over the ensuing decades involved the making of Confederate monuments. Little estimates that the "Teich Monument Works had provided at least one-third of all Confederate monuments in Texas." In 1896, he was made an honorary "daughter" of the Daughters of the Confederacy.

== Personal life and death ==
Teich married Elvina Lang; they had three daughters.

Teich died on January 27, 1939, in Llano, Texas.

== Works ==
- Confederate War Memorial, Dallas, Texas, (1896)
- Volunteer Firemen Monument (1896), Texas State Capitol, Austin, Texas
- Confederate Soldiers Monument San Antonio, Texas, (1901).
- (with Pompeo Coppini) Confederate Soldiers Monument (1903), Texas State Capitol, Austin, Texas
- Statue of Richard W. Dowling, (1905), Houston, Texas
- (with John Paulding) Over the Top statue, World War I Memorial (1921), Llano County Courthouse; Llano, Texas
- Gregg County Confederate Monument, Gregg County Courthouse, Longview, Texas, (1911)
