= Miss Freedom =

Statue on the dome of the Georgia State Capitol (US)

Coordinates: 33°44′56.35″N 84°23′17.33″W

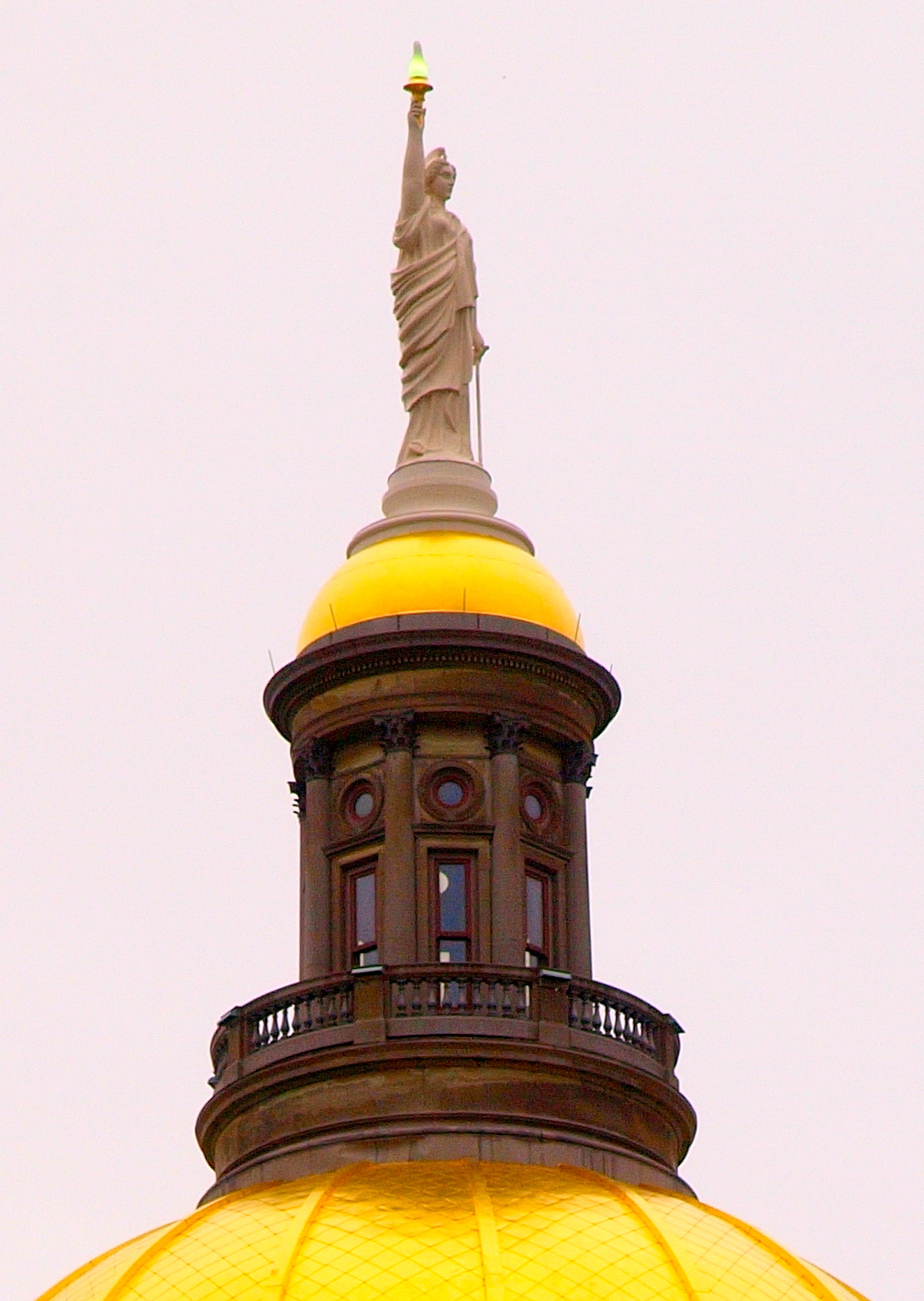
The statue atop the Georgia State Capitol building.

Miss Freedom, originally named Goddess of Liberty, is the statue adorning the dome of the Georgia State Capitol since 1889. Commissioned in 1888, the hollow copper statue is painted white, weighs over 1600 lbs, and is over 26 feet tall. She was sculpted with a torch in her right hand and a sword in her left. The torch is a functioning mercury-vapor lamp, casting a blue-green light at night. The torch in her right hand was supposed to be a working light continuously, but it remained dark until it was reconstructed in 1959. Tube and trolley systems have been installed so the bulb can be changed from the inside.

== History ==
There were four different capitol locations before the current location. The current capitol building resides in the city of Atlanta. Construction of the Atlanta capitol started on November 13, 1884. The building took four and a half years and 250 men to complete. The statue of Miss Freedom was installed in 1888. Completion, and opening of the building, took place on March 20, 1889.

The statue's origin is vague as the original documents about the construction of the State Capitol and Miss Freedom were burned. What records remain suggest that the architectural firm in charge of the building, Edbrooke and Burnham, ordered the statue from the W.H. Mullins Manufacturing Company in Salem, Ohio. The statue's name before its christening is unknown, but it has possessed the names Miss Freedom, Liberty, and Goddess of Liberty.

== Description ==
The statue wears a Phrygian cap, or pileus, adorned with a star. It wears a robe and holds a torch in her right hand and a sword in her left. The torch is meant to represent truth or enlightenment while the sword symbolizes authoritative armed liberty or enforced justice.

== See also ==
- Statue of Freedom, an 1863 sculpture by Thomas Crawford atop the dome of the US Capitol
- Statue of Liberty (Liberty Enlightening the World), 1886 statue by Frédéric Auguste Bartholdi in New York City
- Goddess of Liberty, a similar 1888 statue by Elijah E. Myers atop the Texas State Capitol dome, in Austin, Texas
