= Confederate Memorial Museum =

Museum in Columbus, Texas, US

- War Memorial Museum
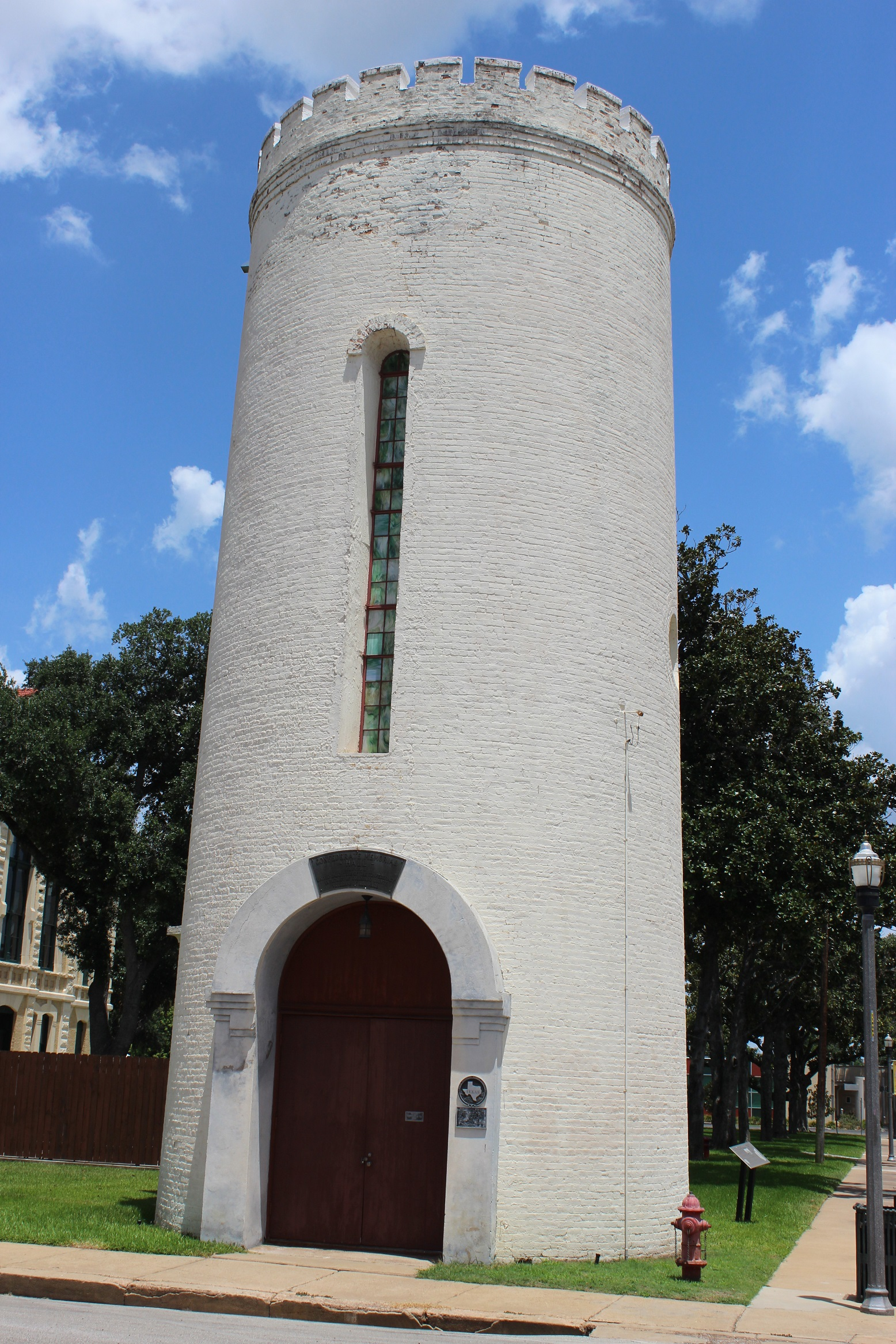

- Location within Texas Location within the United States
- Interactive map of Confederate Memorial Museum
- 29°42′20″N 96°32′25″W
- Location: Columbus, Texas

History
- Built: 1883

Recorded Texas Historic Landmark
- Official name: Confederate Memorial Museum
- Designated: 1966
- Reference no.: 1028

The Confederate Memorial Museum was a Confederate museum that occupied a former water tower at 1101–1199 Milam Street, Columbus, Texas, in the United States. The United Daughters of the Confederacy opened the museum in 1962. The water tower now houses a War Memorial Museum. The museum features artifacts from veterans of all wars, and photographs and a small collection of artifacts related to the city of Columbus and Colorado County.

== Building ==
The museum was housed in an unusual water tower constructed in 1883. The town's water system was modernized in 1926, and the water tower was no longer needed. The water tank was removed, but the building, with three-foot brick walls, was so solid that dynamite meant to demolish it had no effect. The United Daughters of the Confederacy purchased it and used it as a meeting place. The building is a Recorded Texas Historic Landmark.

== See also ==
- Texas Confederate Museum (closed)
- Texas Civil War Museum
