= War Memorial Museum =

War Memorial Museum may refer to:

- War Memorial Museum, formerly Confederate Memorial Museum, in Columbus, Texas, United States
- War Memorial of Korea, in Yongsan-dong, Yongsan-gu, Seoul, South Korea
