= Confederate Soldiers Monument (Austin, Texas) =

Monument in Austin, Texas, U.S.

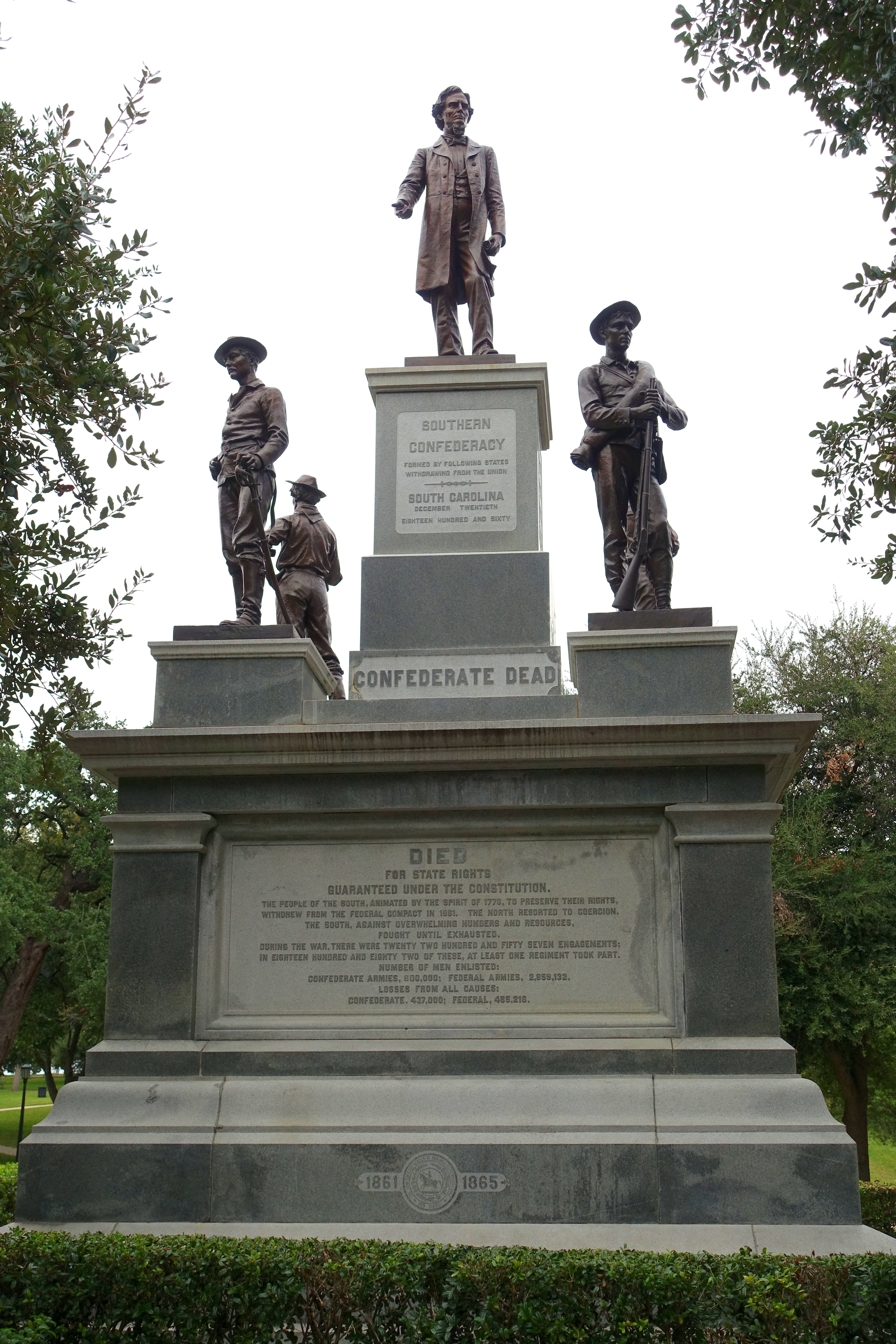
- The monument in 2015
- Artist: Pompeo Coppini; Frank Teich
- Year: 1903
- Medium: Sculpture
- Location: Austin, Texas, United States
- 30.273111°N 97.740792°W
- Owner: Texas State Preservation Board

The Confederate Soldiers Monument, also known as the Confederate Dead Monument, is a Confederate memorial installed outside the Texas State Capitol in Austin, Texas. It was erected in 1903. Its sculpture was designed by Pompeo Coppini, and its base was designed by Frank Teich. The sculpture was cast by Roman Bronze Works (New York City).

The monument consists of five bronze figures on the base that represent the Confederate Military: Infantry, Cavalry, Artillery and Navy. At the top of the monument standing far above the other figures is Jefferson Davis, the President of the Confederate States.

Alongside 11 other Confederate monuments at the capitol, it was largely funded by United Daughters of the Confederacy, a group of women descended from Confederate soldiers.

== Historical inaccuracies ==
The listed sizes of the Confederate (600,000) and Union (2,859,132) forces are incorrect, greatly exaggerating the advantage held by the Union. While the inscription dedicates the statue to Confederate soldiers who "died for states rights guaranteed under the Constitution", the Texas Declaration Of Causes (1861) does not use the phrase “states rights”, and repeatedly cites opposition to the abolition of the slavery and granting black Americans legal rights.

== Inscription ==
CONFEDERATE DEAD

DIED

FOR STATES RIGHTS

GUARANTEED UNDER THE CONSTITUTION

THE PEOPLE OF THE SOUTH, ANIMATED BY THE SPIRIT OF 1776, TO PRESERVE THEIR RIGHTS,

WITHDREW FROM THE FEDERAL COMPACT IN 1861. THE NORTH RESORTED TO COERCION.

THE SOUTH, AGAINST OVERWHELMING NUMBERS AND RESOURCES,

FOUGHT UNTIL EXHAUSTED,

DURING THE WAR THERE WERE TWENTY TWO HUNDRED AND FIFTY SEVEN ENGAGEMENTS;

IN EIGHTEEN HUNDRED AND EIGHTY TWO OF THESE, AT LEAST ONE REGIMENT TOOK PART.

NUMBER OF MEN ENLISTED:

CONFEDERATE ARMIES 600,000; FEDERAL ARMIES 2,859,132

LOSSES FROM ALL CAUSES

CONFEDERATE, 437,000; FEDERAL, 485,216

== See also ==
- Lost Cause of the Confederacy
