= Dobie Center =

Residence hall on the University of Texas Austin campus

Dobie Twenty21
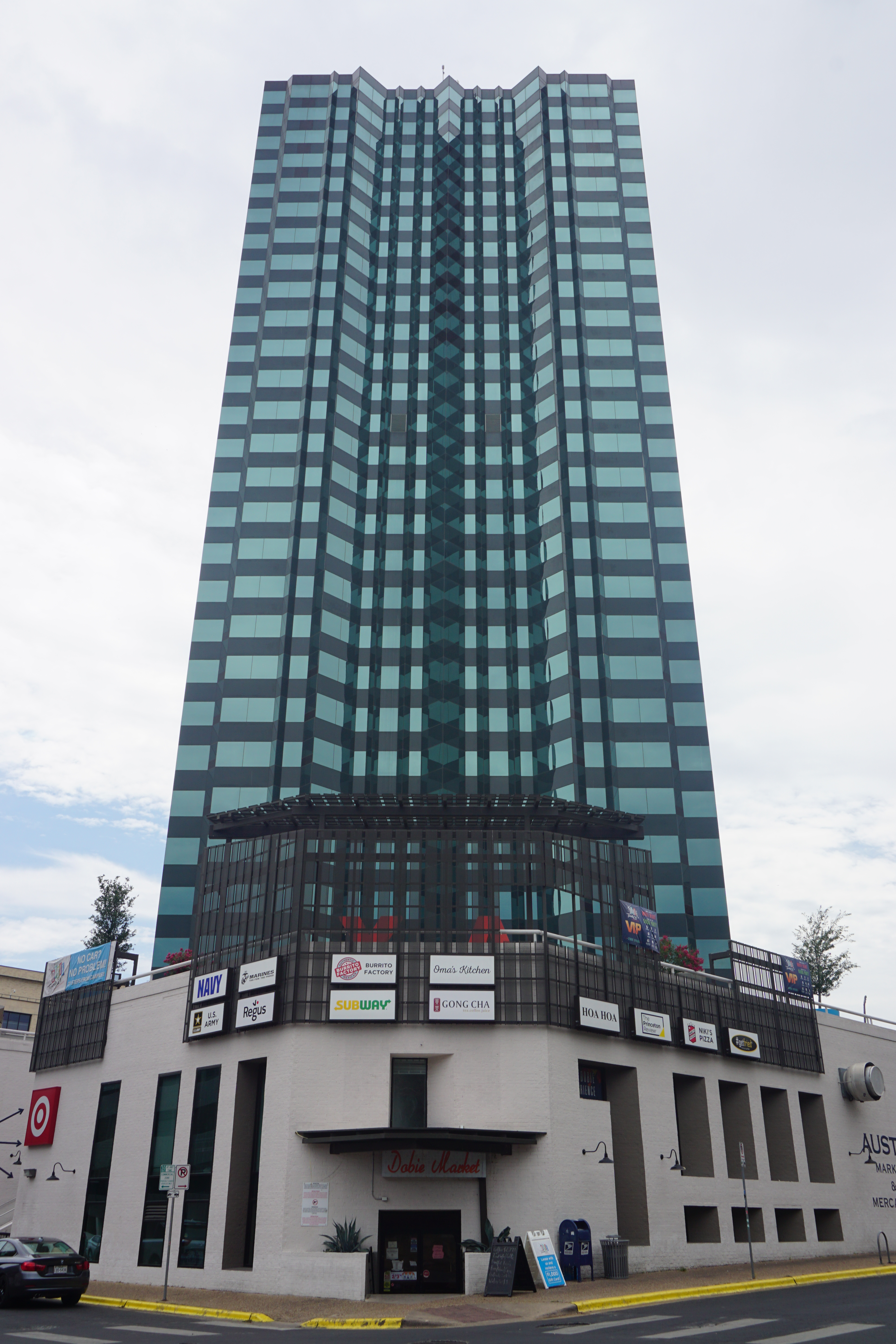
- Former names: Dobie Center

General information
- Type: Residential
- Location: 2021 Guadalupe Street, Austin, Texas, United States
- Coordinates: 30°17′00″N 97°44′28″W
- Named for: J. Frank Dobie
- Owner: University of Texas at Austin

Technical details
- Floor count: 27
- Lifts/elevators: 6

Design and construction
- Architecture firm: J. & G. Daverman and Associates

Other information
- Public transit: CapMetro Bus 640

Website
- housing.utexas.edu/housing/residence-halls/residence-hall-locations/dobie-twenty21

Dobie Center, named after J. Frank Dobie, is a formerly privately owned 27-story residence hall located on the University of Texas at Austin campus. On October 12, 2021, the University of Texas announced it was purchasing the center to provide additional school-owned housing near campus for its students. In addition to being a residence for students, Dobie contains a two-story mall, restaurants, and specialty stores.

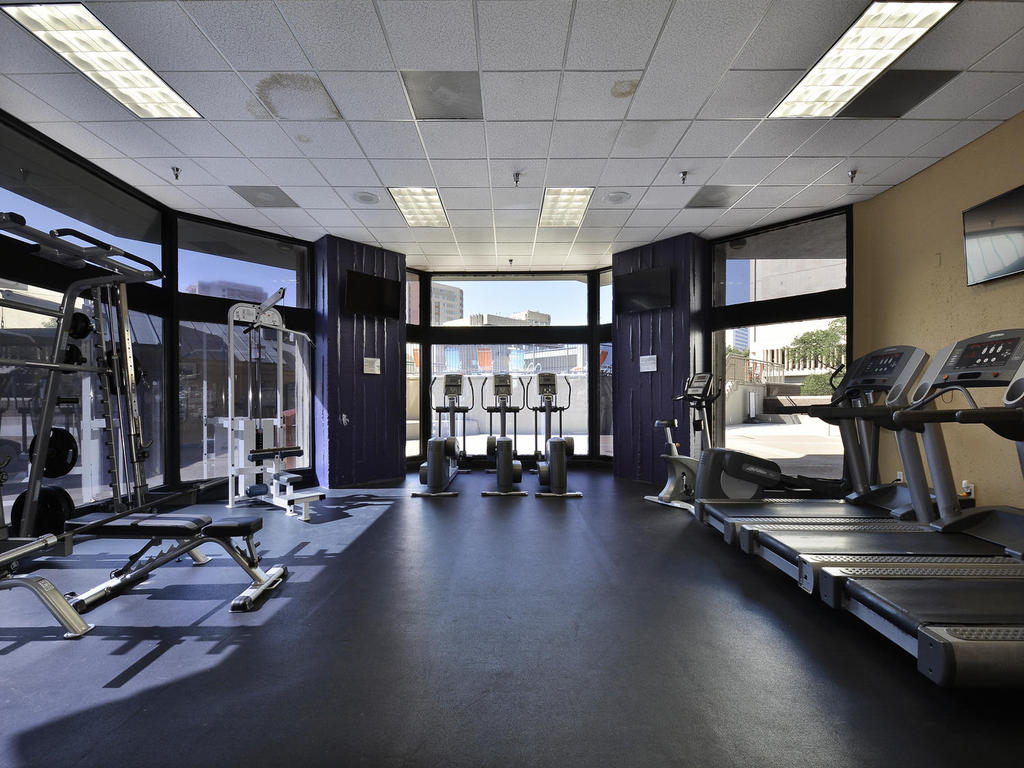
Fitness center

The property features a pool, fitness center, two sport courts, six elevators, and an industrial-styled cafeteria.

== History ==
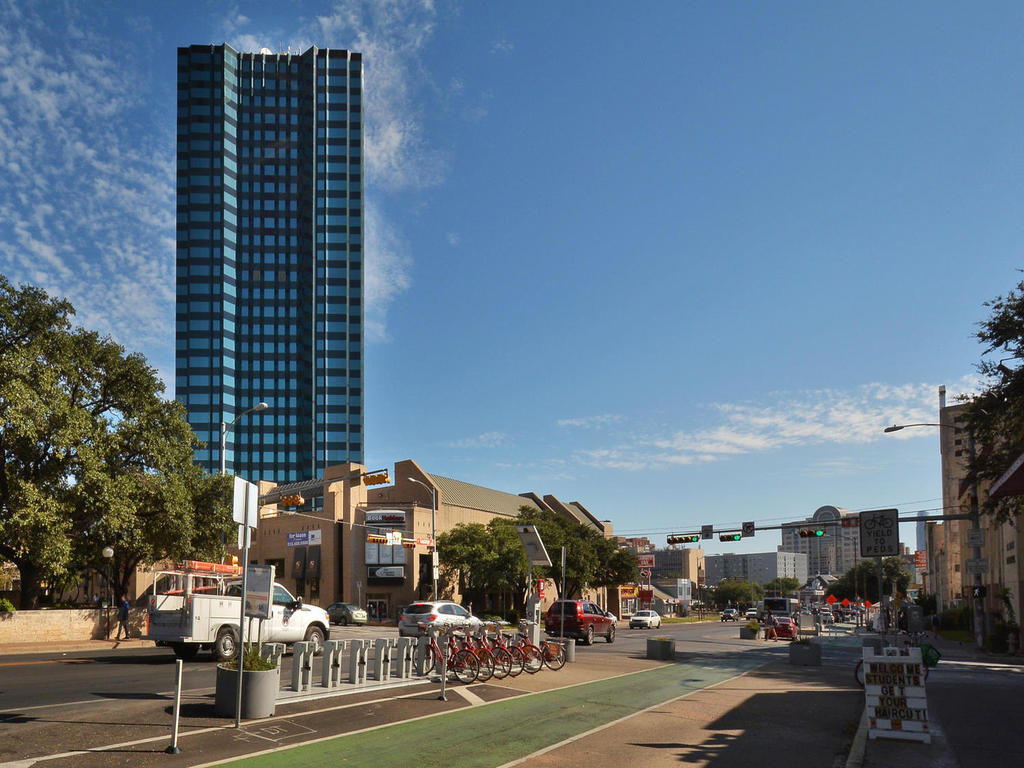
A picture of the Dobie Center

The building was designed by J. & G. Daverman and Associates in 1970. It opened to residents in September, 1971. The lower mall was opened to tenants in 1972. Upon its completion, Dobie Center was the tallest building in Austin, surpassing the Texas State Capitol, which had held the title for nearly 90 years. Dobie was the first modernist building to exist on UT's campus.

The building underwent a US$10 million facelift in 1990 to replace its then brick façade by exposing the glass underneath. When classes began in the Fall 1989 semester, would-be residents of Dobie Center were temporarily relocated to the Radisson Plaza Hotel.

On November 11, 2006, a fire, started by an improperly extinguished cigarette, broke out on the pool deck of Dobie Center causing an estimated $600,000 worth of damage. The pool deck reopened in late April 2008. The fire was contained to an area outside of the residential tower. This structure was an old wooden deck that has been replaced by a concrete structure.

The Dobie Mall was completely remodeled by the Nix Group in the '90s and is now a hub of student activity and shopping. The mall is a two-story shopping and food center featuring a food court, stores, and even a chapel. The food court today features seating for 500 and various assorted independently run food outlets.

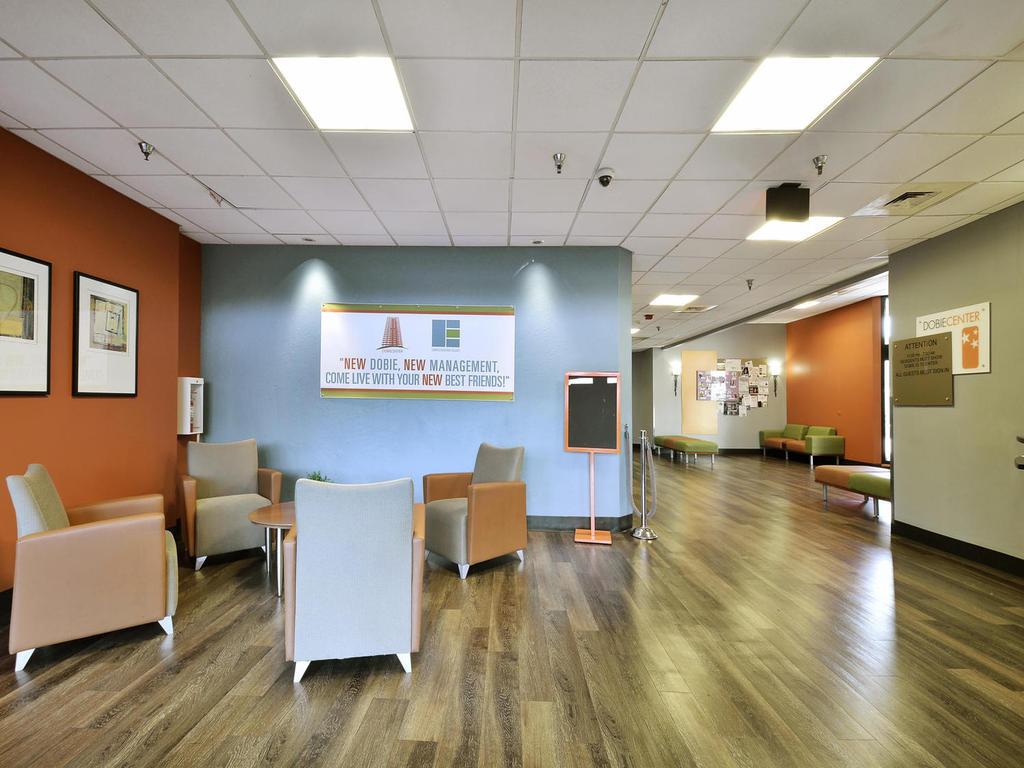
Dobie's Lobby

In 2014 the Dobie Center became managed by Campus Evolution Villages, marking the start of over $4 million in renovations, including new hardwood floors, a cafeteria face-lift, and an updated movie and game room. However, there was controversy during this time due to allegations made by many students that Campus Evolution Villages did not uphold their end of a bargain.

In October 2021, the University of Texas at Austin purchased Dobie Center for US$104 million.

On April 21, 2026 it was announced that Dobie Hall would be renamed Dell Hall, following Michael Dell's $750 million donation to a planned expansion of the Dell Medical School at the J. J. Pickle Research Campus. Whilst a UT student, Michael Dell, founder of Dell Technologies, lived in room 2713. Following this announcement, it was announced that Dobie would be unavailable as a residence hall for the 2026-2027 school year.

== Life at Dobie ==
The Dobie Center offers monthly resident events ranging from floor events to dorm-wide events, such as book club.

Additionally, The University of Texas's campus and covered parking garage are draws for students looking for convenience. Dobie had been historically known for having recurring elevator problems, with many students having been trapped in elevators for multiple hours; however, management recently took a major crack on the problem by replacing one of its three decade-old elevators.

There is a resident assistant on every few floors at Dobie. Dobie is also known for being able to accommodate international exchange students who are looking for a short-term stay due to its low occupancy rate.

== Notable people ==
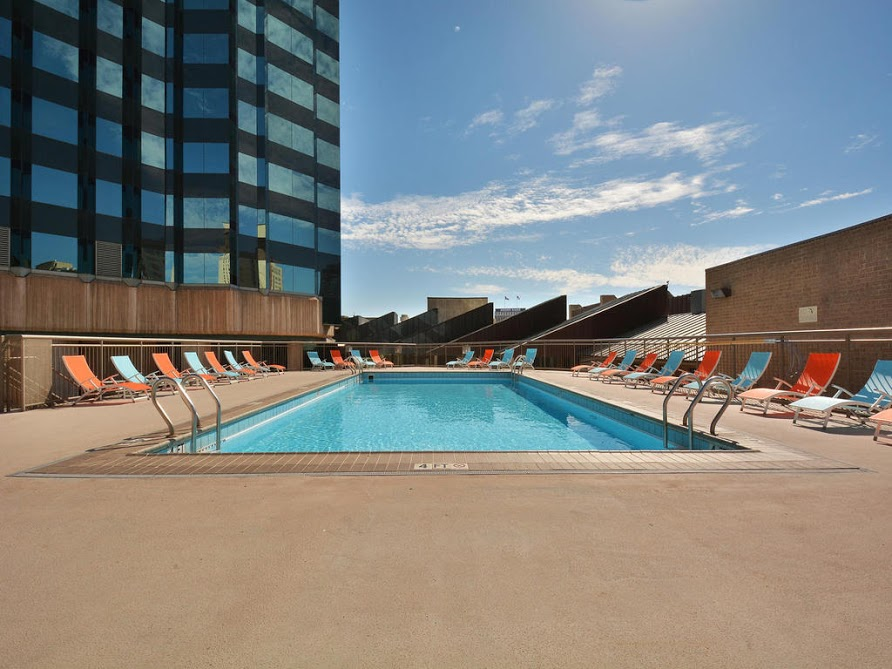
A view of Dobie's pool

2016 presidential candidate and former governor of Florida Jeb Bush lived in Dobie Center.

Daniel Johnston, outsider singer-songwriter and artist, worked at a now-closed McDonalds in Dobie Mall, located in Dobie Center. He would, reportedly, hand out tapes of his album Hi, How Are You to people while working.

American businessman Michael Dell founded Dell in room 2713 while living in Dobie between 1983-1984.

== Stores and restaurants ==
Some of the stores and restaurants inside Dobie Twenty21 include:

- Emiliano's Burrito Factory
- Dobie Market
- Gogo Wok
- Gong Cha
- Oma's Kitchen
- Army Recruiting Office
- Navy Recruiting Office
- U.S. Marine Corps Officer Selection Office
- Regus
- Target
- Tikka House Indian Express

Preceded by Texas Capitol	Tallest Building in Austin; 1972—1984; 112m	Succeeded by One American Center
