= Texas Capitol Vietnam Veterans Monument =

Monument in Austin, Texas, U.S.

Coordinates: 30.2755°N 97.7390°W

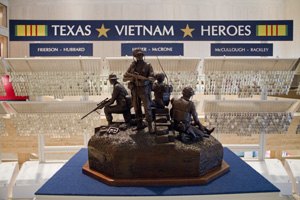
Maquette of the monument

The Texas Capitol Vietnam Veterans Monument, is a memorial designed by New Mexico artist Duke Sundt, installed on the grounds of the Texas State Capitol in Austin, Texas, United States. It serves as a tribute to all Texans who served in the Vietnam War and a memorial to the 3,417 who died. Ground was broken on March 25, 2013 on the northeast side of the Capitol. The monument was dedicated on March 29, 2014.

== History of the monument ==
Texas State Representative Wayne Smith and State Senator Juan "Chuy" Hinojosa met with fellow Vietnam Veterans in December 2005, each donating $1,000 to form a nonprofit organization that would finance a monument commemorating Texans who served in the Vietnam War. Other members of the Texas Capitol Vietnam Veterans Monument Committee included Robert Floyd, John Miterko, Terry B. Burkett, Alan Erwin, Phil Price, Kerry Orr, Don Dorsey, Kinnan Golemon, Richard McBride, and Michael Wright. Lady Bird Johnson, wife of former President Lyndon Baines Johnson, served as Honorary Co-Chair. The legislators co-authored House Concurrent Resolution 36 - 79th Texas Legislature. The monument is being paid for by donations from individuals, corporations and veteran organizations, along with a $500,000 matching grant from the Texas Historical Commission.

== Rationale ==
Nearly 60,000 Americans died in the Vietnam War, and 3,417 of them were from Texas. At a reading of the names of fallen veterans held in the Lady Bird Johnson Auditorium at the LBJ Library, newspaper reporter and Vietnam war correspondent Joe Galloway explained the purpose of the Texas Vietnam Veterans Monument is to "encourage hometowns across America to go all out to welcome Vietnam veterans--the welcome they didn't get 50 years ago."

== Design ==
The monument is a 14-foot-tall bronze sculpture featuring five seven-foot tall infantry figures in patrol positions situated atop an eight-sided base. Designed to represent the diversity of Texas Vietnam Veterans, the figures will be Hispanic-American, African-American, Asian, Native-American, and Caucasian. Entombed within the monument will be 3,417 handcrafted dog tags, representing each of the Texas veterans who died in Vietnam. The estimated cost of the monument is $1.5 million.

== Texas Vietnam Heroes Exhibit ==
The Texas Vietnam Heroes Exhibit is a visual representation of the 3,417 Texans who did not survive to come home from Vietnam. Designed by Marine Vietnam veteran Don Dorsey, it was built by Excalibur Exhibits and consists of hand-embossed dog tags featuring the name, rank, branch of service, and date of loss and home of record for each veteran. A second dog tag bearing duplicate information will be entombed in the Monument on the Texas Capitol grounds. The exhibit opened to the public at the LBJ Library in Austin, Texas on March 24, 2013. On the same day, a reading of the names of all 3,417 veterans was held in the Lady Bird Johnson Auditorium at the LBJ Library, and ground was broken at the Texas State Capitol. The exhibit will travel from Austin to San Antonio, Lubbock, Houston, Fort Worth and Beaumont while the monument is being constructed.
