= Texas Confederate Museum =

Former museum in Austin, Texas

The Texas Confederate Museum was a museum in Austin, Texas, in the United States. The United Daughters of the Confederacy opened it in 1903 in a room on the ground floor of the Texas Capitol and closed it in 1988. From 1919 to 1988, it was housed on the ground floor of the Old Land Office Building, while the second floor housed a separate museum for the collections of the Daughters of the Republic of Texas. These museums occupied the structure even longer than the Texas Land Office did. In 1990, the Old Land Office Building reopened after closing for renovations as the Capitol Visitors Center and the museum closed. The paper portion of its collection was donated to the Nita Stewart Haley Memorial Library in Midland, Texas, the artifacts to the Texas Civil War Museum near Fort Worth.
