= Statue of Richard W. Dowling =

Sculpture in Houston, Texas, U.S.

Dick Dowling
- The statue, c. 1911
- Artist: Frank Teich
- Year: 1905
- Medium: Sculpture
- Location: Houston, Texas, U.S.; 29.709044°N 95.390809°W

Dick Dowling is a 1905 marble sculpture of Confederate commander Richard W. Dowling by Frank Teich, previously installed in 1958 at the Cambridge Street entrance into Houston's Hermann Park, in the U.S. state of Texas. In June 2020, the memorial was removed in response to the George Floyd protests.

== History ==
The monument was publicly funded. Prior to 1958, the statue was at the city hall. This was the first public monument commissioned by the city government; he was chosen as he fought in favor of the CSA.

The site received a Historical Marker (#11938) by the Texas Historical Commission in 1998.

On August 19, 2017, Andrew Schneck was arrested at the statue with bomb materials. In response to the nationwide protests following the murder of George Floyd at the hands of the police in June 2020, the statue was removed from Hermann Park and placed into storage.

== See also ==
- 1905 in art
- List of monuments and memorials removed during the George Floyd protests
- List of public art in Houston
