= Volunteer Firemen Monument =

Monument in Austin, Texas, U.S.

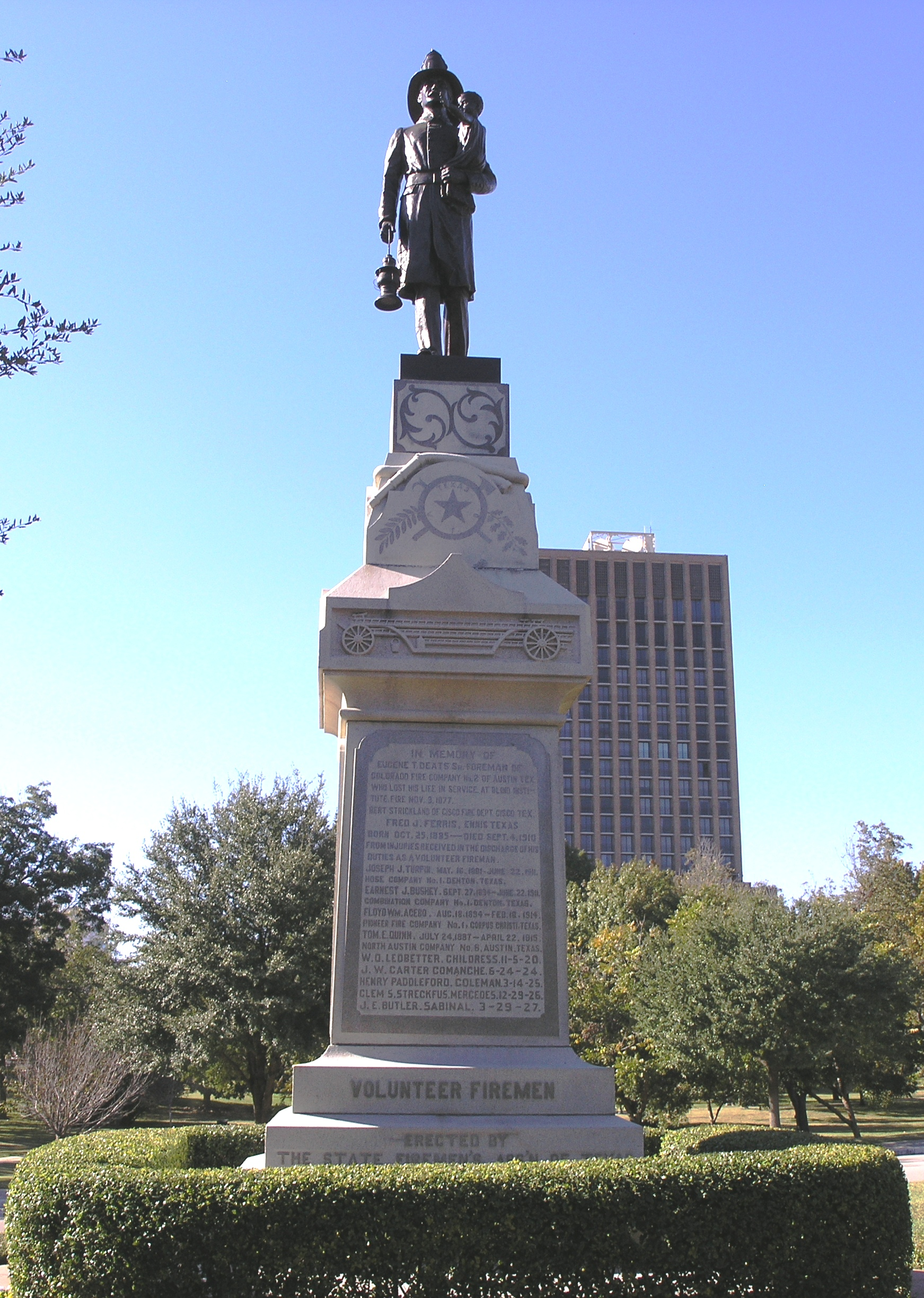
- The monument in 2006
- Year: 1896
- Medium: Bronze sculpture
- Location: Austin, Texas, United States
- 30.273183°N 97.741045°W

The Volunteer Firemen Monument is an outdoor memorial commemorating Texan volunteer firefighters who died while in service, installed on the Texas State Capitol grounds in Austin, Texas, United States. It was erected by the State Firemen's Association of Texas in 1896, and modified in 1905. The monument features a bronze sculpture of a fireman carrying a child in his left arm and a lantern in his opposite, designed by J. Segesman. The statue rests on a granite base designed by Frank Teich, which has a ring of granite pillars with inscribed names of volunteers. According to the Texas State Preservation Board, the memorial has "historical omissions and errors", which have been kept.

== See also ==
- 1896 in art
