= Goddess of Liberty (Texas State Capitol) =

Sculpture by Elijah E. Myers in Austin, Texas

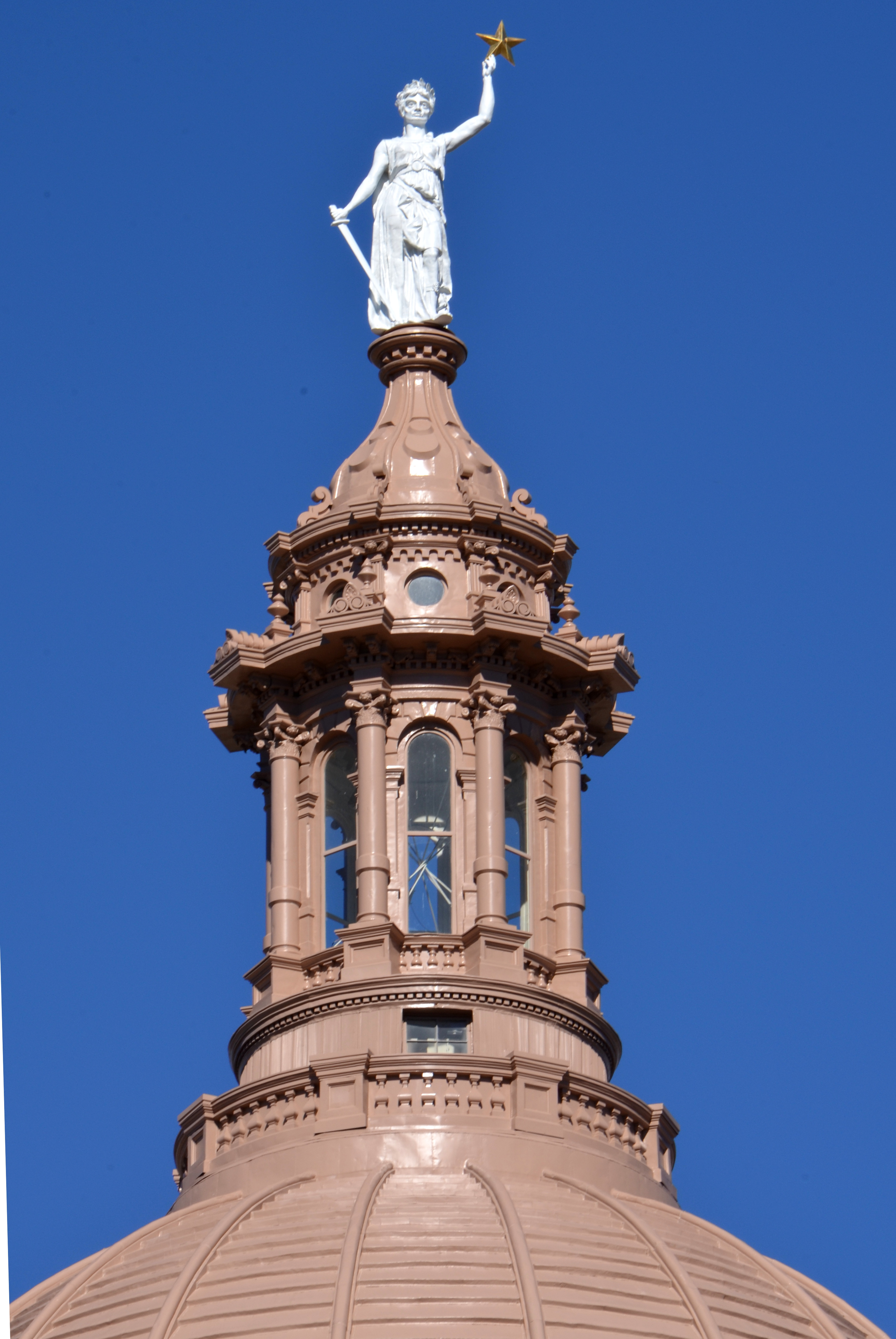
- The statue in 2013
- Artist: Elijah E. Myers
- Location: Austin, Texas, United States; 30.2745831°N 97.7403868°W

Goddess of Liberty is a sculpture by Elijah E. Myers, installed atop the Texas State Capitol dome, in Austin, Texas, United States. The original statue was erected in February 1888. It was replaced by a replica on June 14, 1986, and the original was restored and relocated to the Bullock Texas State History Museum.

== See also ==
- List of public art in Austin, Texas
- Statue of Freedom, an 1863 sculpture by Thomas Crawford atop the dome of the US Capitol
- Statue of Liberty (Liberty Enlightening the World), 1886 statue by Frédéric Auguste Bartholdi in New York City
- Miss Freedom, a similar 1889 statue on the dome of the Georgia State Capitol (US)
