= General Land Office Building (Austin, Texas) =

- U.S. National Register of Historic Places
- Recorded Texas Historic Landmark
- Texas State Antiquities Landmark
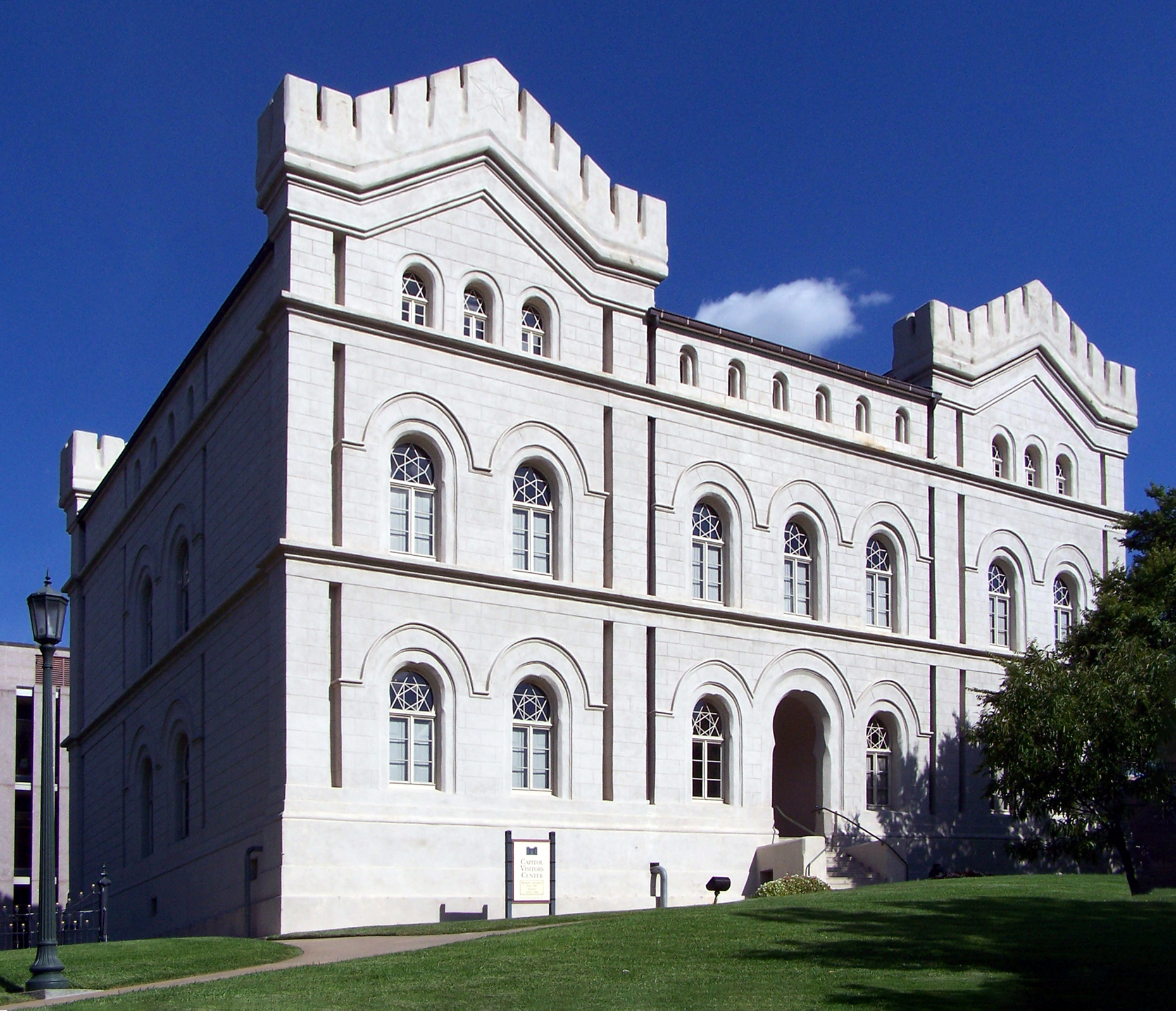
- The Old Land Office Building

- Location within Texas Location within the United States
- Location: 108 East 11th Street; Austin, Texas
- Coordinates: 30°16′21.72″N 97°44′21.48″W
- Area: 0.1 acres (0.040 ha)
- Built: 1857
- Architect: Christoph Conrad Stremme
- Architectural style: Romanesque
- NRHP reference No.: 70000769
- RTHL No.: 15288
- TSAL No.: 2912

Significant dates
- Added to NRHP: August 25, 1970
- Designated RTHL: 1962
- Designated TSAL: 5/28/1981

The General Land Office Building, completed in 1857, in Austin, Texas is the oldest surviving state government office building in the city and the first building designed by a university-trained architect (German architect Christoph Conrad Stremme). The building features a dramatic medieval castle style known as Rundbogenstil, or "rounded arch" around the windows and doors. There is also a Norman style influence in the castle-like parapets. The exterior walls are limestone rubble smoothed over with stucco and scored to simulate cut stone blocks.

The building is located on the southeast corner of the Texas State Capitol grounds. One employee, William Sidney Porter - pen name O. Henry Porter - worked in the office from 1887 to 1891, and would later attain fame as a writer. Some of his works would include those set at the building, such as "Bexar Script No. 2692" and "Georgia's Ruling".

The building functioned as the state's land office building until 1917 (60 years) when the agency moved to a larger building across the street. From 1919 until 1988 (70 years) the building housed museums run by the Daughters of the Republic of Texas on the second floor, and the United Daughters of the Confederacy on the first floor. The building was modified during the mid-20th century but was vacated, then restored between 1989 and 1992. The project returned the building's interior and exterior to resemble its late 19th-century appearance.

Today, it serves as the Capitol Visitors Center, offering exhibits and tours about the Texas State Capitol. There is also a Texas Department of Transportation Travel Center that offers free maps and literature on travel destinations throughout the state.

The building was designated a Recorded Texas Historic Landmark in 1962 and listed on the National Register of Historic Places on August 25, 1970.
