= Texas Civil War Museum =

Museum in White Settlement

Coordinates: 32°46′21″N 97°28′27″W

The Texas Civil War Museum, located in White Settlement, a suburb of Fort Worth, opened in 2006. It was the largest American Civil War museum west of the Mississippi River until it closed on October 30, 2024.

It consisted of three separate galleries. The first displayed a Civil War militaria collection, emphasizing flags. The second displayed a Victorian dress collection. The third was a Confederate collection from the Texas United Daughters of the Confederacy (UDC), which controlled one of three seats on the museum's board. The museum's collection included the former Texas Confederate Museum in Austin, which the UDC owned. The remainder was acquired by Ray Richey, an oil company executive who built the museum and is its president and curator. "Experts say [it] is the finest private collection in existence." Richey's collection was primarily militaria, but also on display were the Victorian dresses collected by Judy Richey, curator of the dress collection.

The City of Dallas, wishing to dispose of its Robert E. Lee statue, considered lending it to the museum, the only local institution willing to accept it. The city decided not to lend it because it would not be displayed in its proper context, according to the city.

Some of the cabinets used to hold militaria and the Victorian Dresses were donated to the National Confederate Museum at Elm Springs, Tennessee, and the Jefferson Davis Presidential Library and Museum in Buloxi, Mississippi.

The museum had attracted criticism for being an advocate and apologist for the Confederacy. According to John Fullinwider, a Dallas educator and activist, the museum presents the Lost Cause of the Confederacy mythos of the American Civil War; the museum's movie, "Our Honor, Our Rights: Texas and Texans in the Civil War" is "romanticized", "a lovely bit of 'Lost Cause' propaganda". In it, the "sectional crisis" is presented as a contest over states' rights rather than slavery. The author of the text of the movie, McMurry University Professor Donald S. Frazier, said that it needed to be updated because "the conversation has changed". The facility sometimes refers to the Civil War as the War Between the States, the name preferred by Confederate sympathizers. The Museum's Web site links to book reviews signed by its "Resident Historian", "Johnny Reb".
