= Texas State Capitol =

State capitol of the U.S. state of Texas

- U.S. National Register of Historic Places
- U.S. National Historic Landmark
- Recorded Texas Historic Landmark
- Texas State Antiquities Landmark
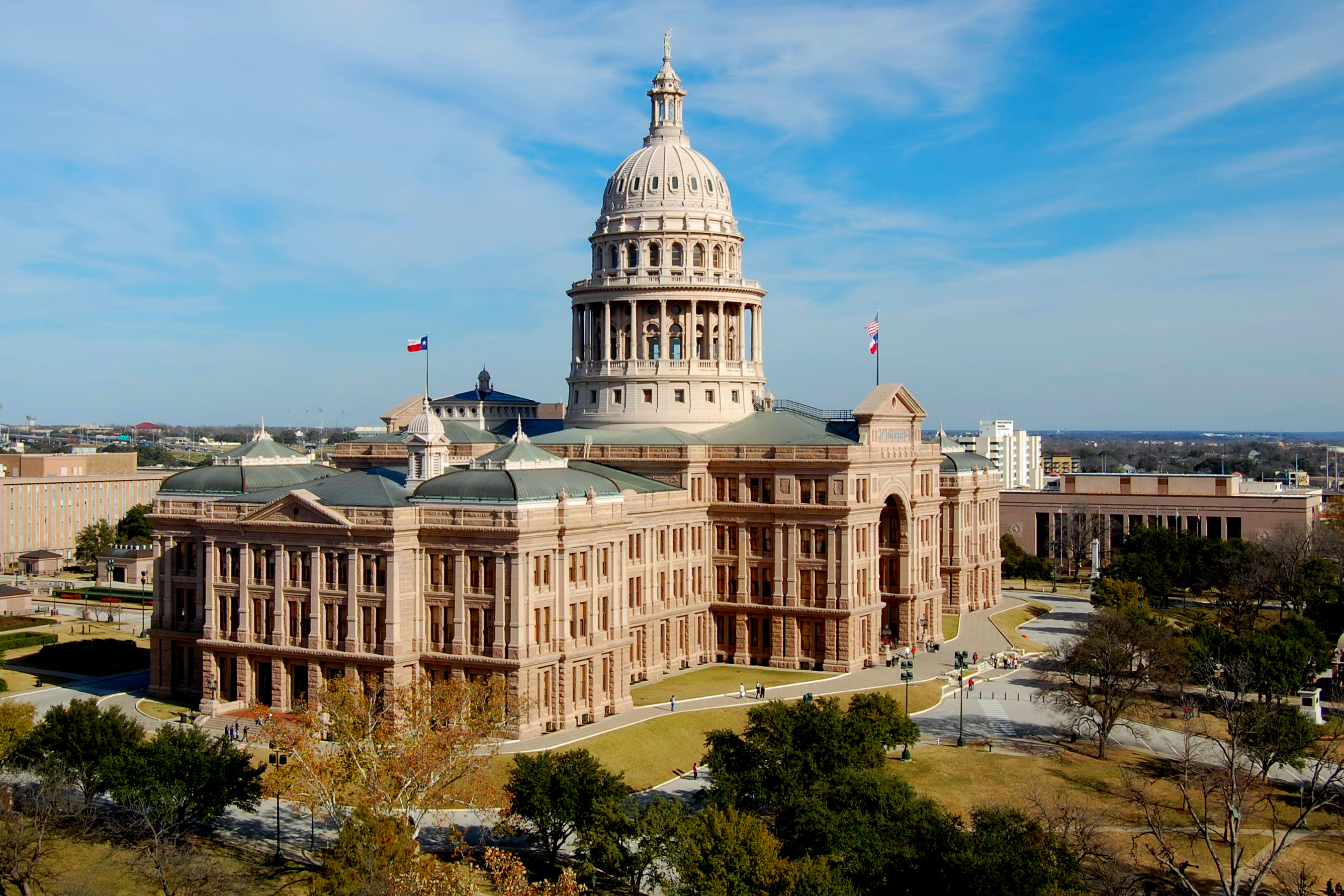
- At the time of its construction, the capitol was billed as "The Seventh Largest Building in the World".

- Location within Texas
- Interactive map of Texas State Capitol
- Location: Congress Avenue and 11th Street; Austin, Texas, U.S.
- Coordinates: 30°16′29″N 97°44′26″W
- Area: 51.4 acres (20.8 ha)
- Built: 1885; 141 years ago
- Architect: Elijah E. Myers
- Architectural style: Italian Renaissance Revival
- NRHP reference No.: 70000770
- RTHL No.: 14150
- TSAL No.: 641

Significant dates
- Added to NRHP: June 22, 1970
- Designated NHL: June 23, 1986
- Designated RTHL: 1964
- Designated TSAL: May 28, 1981

The Texas State Capitol is the capitol and seat of government of the U.S. state of Texas. Located in downtown Austin, Texas, United States, the structure houses the offices and chambers of the Texas Legislature and of the Governor of Texas. Designed in 1881 by architect Elijah E. Myers, it was constructed from 1882 to 1888 under the direction of civil engineer Reuben Lindsay Walker. A $75 million underground extension was completed in 1993. The building was added to the National Register of Historic Places in 1970 and recognized as a National Historic Landmark in 1986.

The Texas State Capitol is 302.64 feet (92.24 m) tall, making it the sixth-tallest state capitol and one of several taller than the United States Capitol in Washington, D.C. The capitol was ranked 92nd in the 2007 "America's Favorite Architecture" poll commissioned by the American Institute of Architects.

== History ==
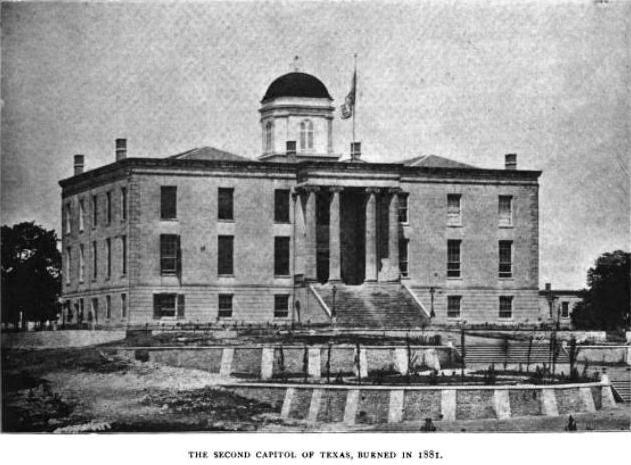
The second Austin capitol building, made of limestone

The current Texas State Capitol is the fourth building to serve that purpose in Austin. The first was a two-room wooden structure (located on the northeast corner of 8th St and Colorado St) which served as the national capitol of the Texas Republic and continued as the seat of government upon Texas' admission to the Union. The second Texas capitol was built of limestone in 1853, on the same site as the present capitol in Austin; it was destroyed by fire in 1881, but plans had already been made to replace it with a new, much larger structure. A temporary capitol was then constructed across the street at 11th St and Congress Ave in 1882. The temporary capitol later burned down in a fire also in 1899.

=== Construction ===
Construction of the Italian Renaissance Revival–style capitol was funded by an article of the state constitution, adopted on February 15, 1876, which authorized the sale of public lands for the purpose. In one of the largest barter transactions of recorded history, the builders of the capitol (John V. Farwell and Charles B. Farwell), known as the Capitol Syndicate, were paid with more than three million acres (12,000 km^{2}) of public land in the Texas Panhandle; this tract later became the largest cattle ranch in the world, the XIT Ranch. The value of the land, combined with expenses, added to a total cost of $3.7 million for the original building. It was constructed largely by convicts or migrant workers, as many as a thousand at a time. The building has been renovated several times, with central air conditioning installed in 1955 and the most recent refurbishments completed in 1997.

The designers originally planned for the building to be clad entirely with hill country limestone quarried in Oatmanville (present-day Oak Hill), about 10 miles (16 km) to the southwest. However, the high iron content of the limestone led it to discolor rapidly with rust stains when exposed to the elements. Learning of the problem, business partners George W. Lacy, Nimrod L. Norton, and William H. Westfall, who were the owners of Granite Mountain near Marble Falls, offered to donate to the state, free of charge, the necessary amount of sunset red (also known as pink) granite to sheathe the building. A new 2.3 mile (3.7 km) spur of the Austin and Northwestern Railroad was constructed to transport the stone from Granite Mountain Quarry to the Austin train terminal. This new branch of the railway line had one fault however: there was a bend in the tracks that was a bit too sharp and trains would occasionally derail, accidentally dumping some of the pink granite. Many of the fallen rocks remain in place and are a local point of interest. Oak Hill limestone does comprise much of the Capitol but most is hidden behind the walls or is in the foundations. Granite Mountain red (or pink) granite was subsequently used for many state government buildings in the Austin area. The project's 900 workers included 86 granite cutters brought from Scotland.

The cornerstone for the building was laid on March 2, 1885, Texas Independence Day, and the building was opened to the public on April 21, 1888, San Jacinto Day, before its completion. The building was officially dedicated by Texas State Senator Temple Houston on May 18, 1888. The dedication ceremony was marked by a weeklong celebration from May 14–19, 1888, that attracted nearly 20,000 visitors and included events such as military drill demonstrations, cattle roping, baseball games, German choral singing, and fireworks. Guests were able to purchase souvenirs such as pieces of red granite and copies of a song written by composer and pianist Leonora Rives-Diaz called the "State Capitol Grand Waltz".

=== Capitol View Corridors ===
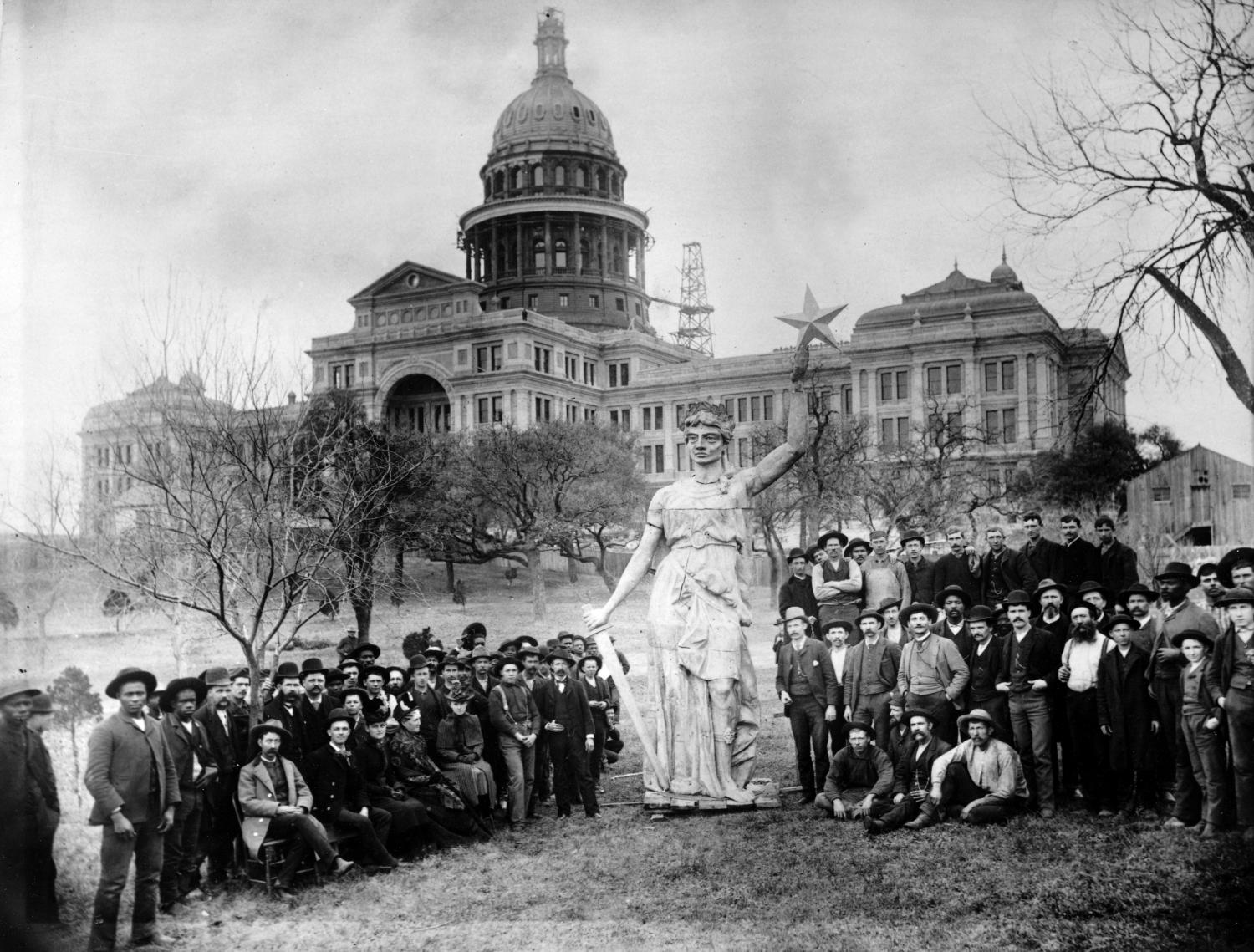
Statue of the Goddess of Liberty on the capitol grounds prior to installation on top of the rotunda as construction is completed, 1888

In 1931, the City of Austin enacted a local ordinance limiting the height of new buildings to a maximum of 200 feet (61 m), aiming to preserve the visual preeminence of the capitol. From that time until the early 1960s, only the University of Texas Main Building Tower was built higher than the limit, but in 1962, developers announced a new 261-foot (80 m) high-rise residential building to be built adjacent to the capitol, called the Westgate Tower. Governor Price Daniel voiced his opposition to the proposed tower, and State Representative Henry Grover of Houston introducing a bill to condemn the property, which was defeated in the Texas House of Representatives by only two votes. The Westgate was eventually completed in 1966, but the controversy over the preservation of the capitol's visual presence that dogged its construction continued to grow.

The Westgate was followed by even taller structures: first the 307-foot (94 m) Dobie Center (designed in 1968), and then a series of ever larger downtown bank towers, culminating in the 395-foot (120 m) One American Center (designed in 1982). In early 1983, inspired by the Westgate and these other structures, State Senator Lloyd Doggett and State Representative Gerald Hill advanced a bill proposing a list of protected "Capitol View Corridors" along which construction would not be permitted, so as to protect the capitol's visibility from a series of points around Austin. The bill was signed into law on May 3, 1983, defining 30 state-protected viewing corridors and prohibiting any construction that would intersect one of them. The City of Austin has adopted similar rules, so that the majority of the corridors are also protected under municipal zoning code, as well as under state law.

=== Capitol extension and restorations ===
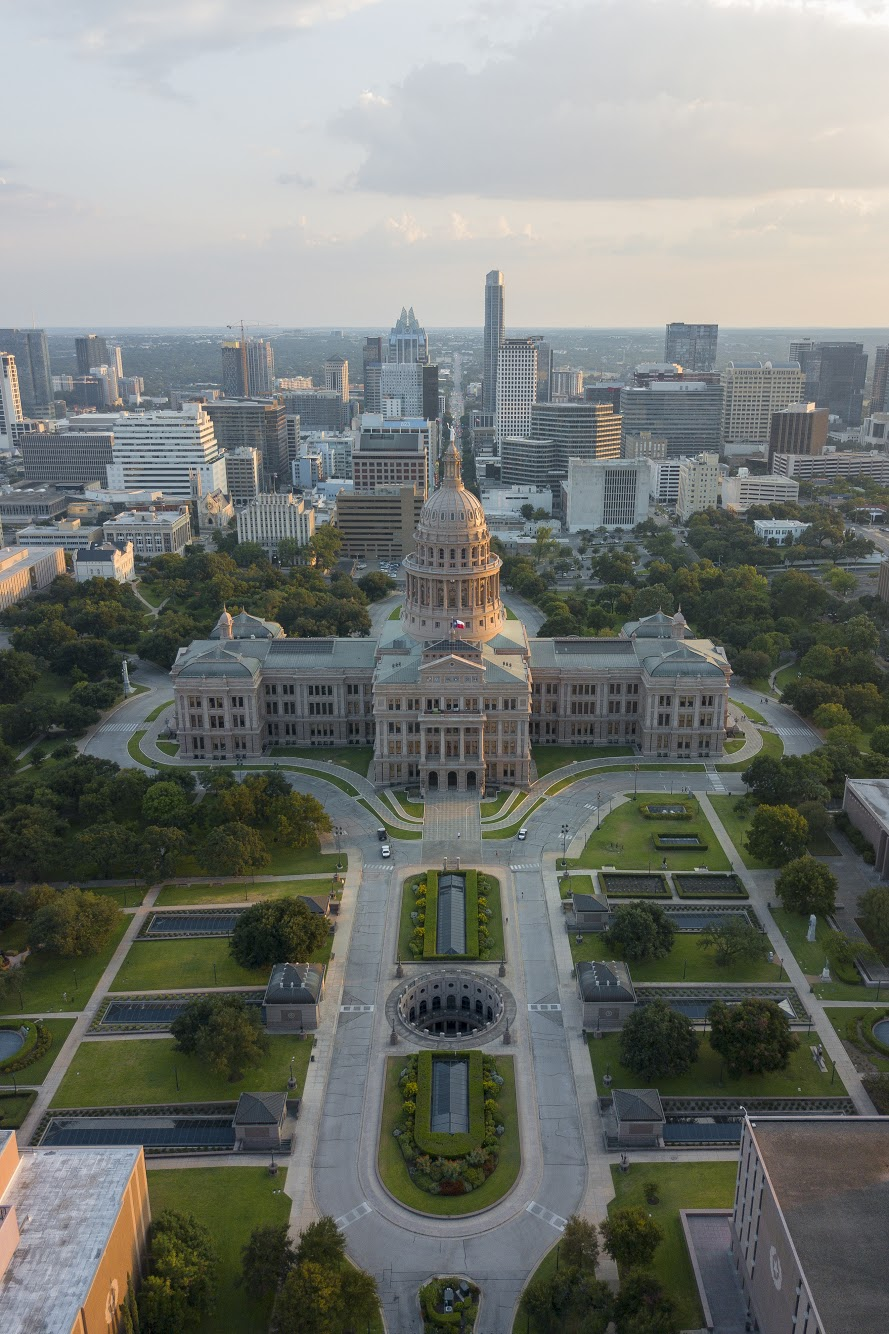
Aerial view of the Capitol extension, featuring the skylights and the inverted rotunda

On February 6, 1983, a fire began in the apartment of William P. Hobby Jr., then the state lieutenant governor. A guest of Hobby's was killed, and four firemen and a policeman were injured by the subsequent blaze. The capitol was crowded with accumulated archives, and the fire was intense and came dangerously close to destroying the structure. It caused severe damage to the east wing and compromised much of the framing, which was largely composed of exposed cast iron posts and beams.

Following the fire, the state took advantage of the extensive rebuilding to update the mechanical and structural systems to modern standards. In November 1985, the original Goddess of Liberty statue on top of the dome was removed by helicopter. A new statue, cast of aluminum in molds made from the original zinc statue, was placed on the dome in June 1986 by the Mississippi National Guard, since Texas lacked the capacity to lift the approx. 3,000-pound statue. The original statue was restored and displayed on the Capitol grounds in a special structure built for it in 1995; it was later moved to the Bullock Texas State History Museum in 2001.

The Old Texas Land Office, on the Capitol grounds, was rebuilt and updated between 1988 and 1990, after which the Capitol Visitors Center was moved there, freeing space in the Capitol. Previously, the building had housed the Texas Confederate Museum, which began in a ground floor room of the Capitol (1903–1920), before moving to the Land Office building.

Additionally, the state sought to address the intensifying shortage of space in the old building, deciding that a new office wing should be added. The logical place for an addition was the plaza immediately to the north; however, a large building there would have eliminated the historic north façade and covered what had traditionally been seen as an important public space. Instead, an expansion to the capitol was built beneath the north plaza, connecting to the existing capitol underground.

In 1993, the $75 million, four-story, underground capitol extension was completed to the north, doubling the square footage available to capitol occupants and providing much-improved functionality. Though the extension encompasses 667,000 square feet (62,000 m^{2}) (nearly twice the floor space of the original building), little evidence exists of such a large structure at ground level, except for extensive skylights camouflaged as planter rows, and the four-story, open-air, inverted rotunda. In 1995, a comprehensive interior and exterior restoration of the original building was completed at a cost of about $98 million. In 1997, the park-like grounds surrounding the capitol received an $8 million renovation and restoration.

In 2016, the Texas Capitol Complex began a master renovation project. Involving the participation and collaboration of The Texas Facilities Commission, the Partnership Advisory Commission, Texas General Land Office, Texas State Preservation Board, Texas Historical Commission, the project sought to create the Texas Mall—an expansion of the Capitol Extension open space. Another goal was to address the rising cost of leased office space for state agencies which were then dispersed around the city by concentrating them in State-owned facilities. After the project completion, Congress Avenue became a pedestrian-only tree-lined mall with lawn panels extending north of 15th Street to 18th Street. Vehicular access for these blocks is now limited to emergency and service vehicles. The lawn panels continue from 18th Street to Martin Luther King Jr. Boulevard with travel lanes for vehicular drop off.

== Design and features ==
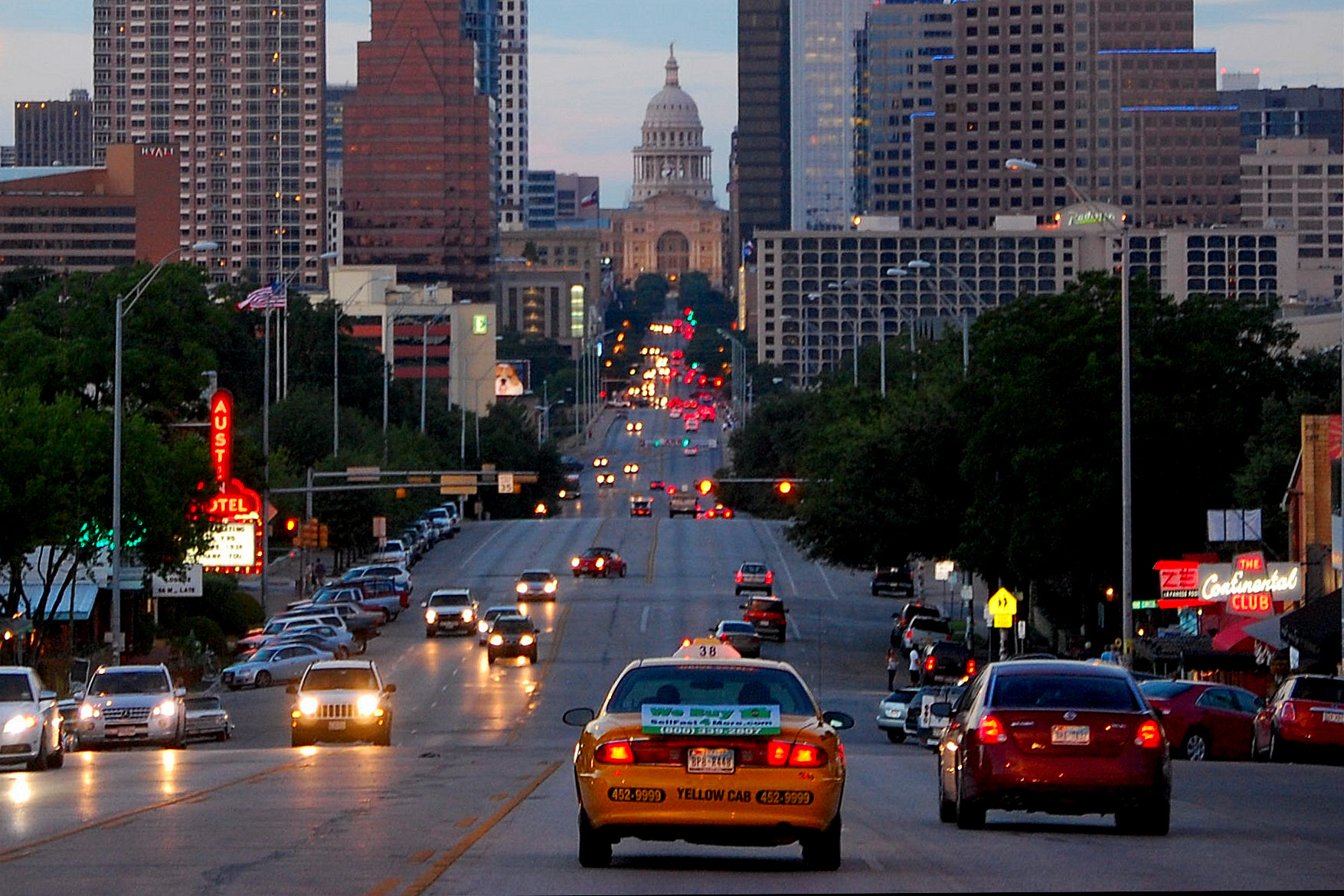
Downtown Austin and the capitol as seen from Congress Avenue

The Texas State Capitol and grounds are located on a hilltop overlooking downtown Austin, with the main entrance facing onto the Congress Avenue Historic District to the south, for which it forms a terminating vista. The northern edge of the capitol grounds lies four blocks south of the University of Texas at Austin.

=== Building ===
The capitol is a roughly rectangular building with a four-story central block, symmetrical three-story wings extending to the east and west, and a dome rising from the center. It is built in an Italian Renaissance Revival style and modeled on the design of the United States Capitol, but with its exterior clad with local red granite. It contains 360,000 square feet (33,000 m^{2}) of floor space (not including the Capitol Extension), more than any other state capitol building, and rests on a 2.25-acre (0.91 ha) footprint. The building has nearly 400 rooms and more than 900 windows.

The interior of the central portion forms an open rotunda beneath the dome. Massive cast-iron staircases flanking the rotunda connect the various levels of the building. The two chambers of the Texas Legislature (the Texas Senate and Texas House of Representatives) meet in large, double-height spaces in the centers of the two wings on the second floor, overlooked by public galleries on the third floor. The remainder of the building is filled with office space, courts, and archives; additional offices fill the underground extension.

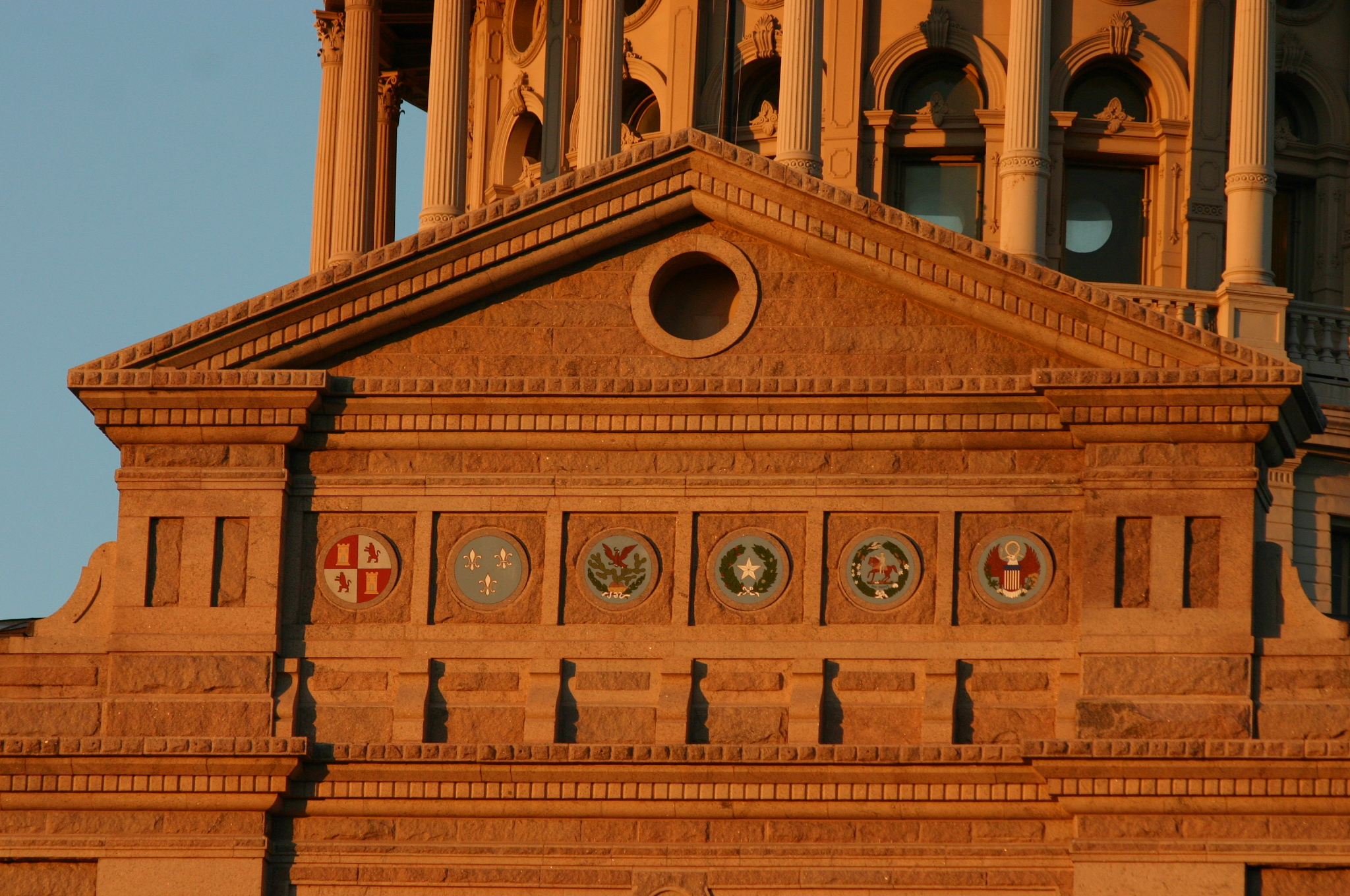
Six coats of arms displayed under the Texas State Capitol Dome (from left to right: Spanish, French, Mexican, Republic of Texas, Confederate States, and United States)

==== Public art and museums ====
The central rotunda is hung with portraits of all the past presidents of the Republic of Texas and governors of the State of Texas; the rotunda is also a whispering gallery. The south foyer features a large portrait of David Crockett, a painting depicting the surrender of General Santa Anna at the Battle of San Jacinto, and sculptures of Sam Houston and Stephen F. Austin made by Elisabet Ney. The Texas Confederate Museum was held in a room on the first floor from its opening in 1903 until 1920, when it was moved into the General Land Office Building (today the Capitol Visitors Center).

In 2019, the State Preservation Board of Texas, chaired by Governor Greg Abbott, voted to remove a plaque placed by the Children of the Confederacy from the rotunda.

=== Grounds ===
The Capitol building is surrounded by 22 acres (8.9 ha) of grounds scattered with statues and monuments. William Munro Johnson, civil engineer, was hired in 1888 to improve the appearance of the grounds. By the time the first monument, commemorating the Heroes of the Alamo, was installed in 1891, the major components of Johnson's plan were in place. These included a "Great Walk" of black and white diamond-patterned pavement shaded by trees. The four oldest monuments are the Heroes of the Alamo Monument (1891), Volunteer Firemen Monument (1896), Confederate Soldiers Monument (1903) and Terry's Texas Rangers Monument (1907), and these flank the tree-lined Great Walk. In the spring of 2013, ground was broken for the Texas Capitol Vietnam Veterans Monument; dedication took place on March 29, 2014.

A granite monument of the Ten Commandments on the grounds of the Texas State Capitol was the topic of a 2005 U.S. Supreme Court case, Van Orden v. Perry, in which the display was challenged as unconstitutional. In late June 2005, the Court in a 5–4 ruling declared that the display was not unconstitutional.

For visitors, the Capitol and downtown Austin feature several convenient garages along with on street parking.

== Gallery ==
=== Exterior ===
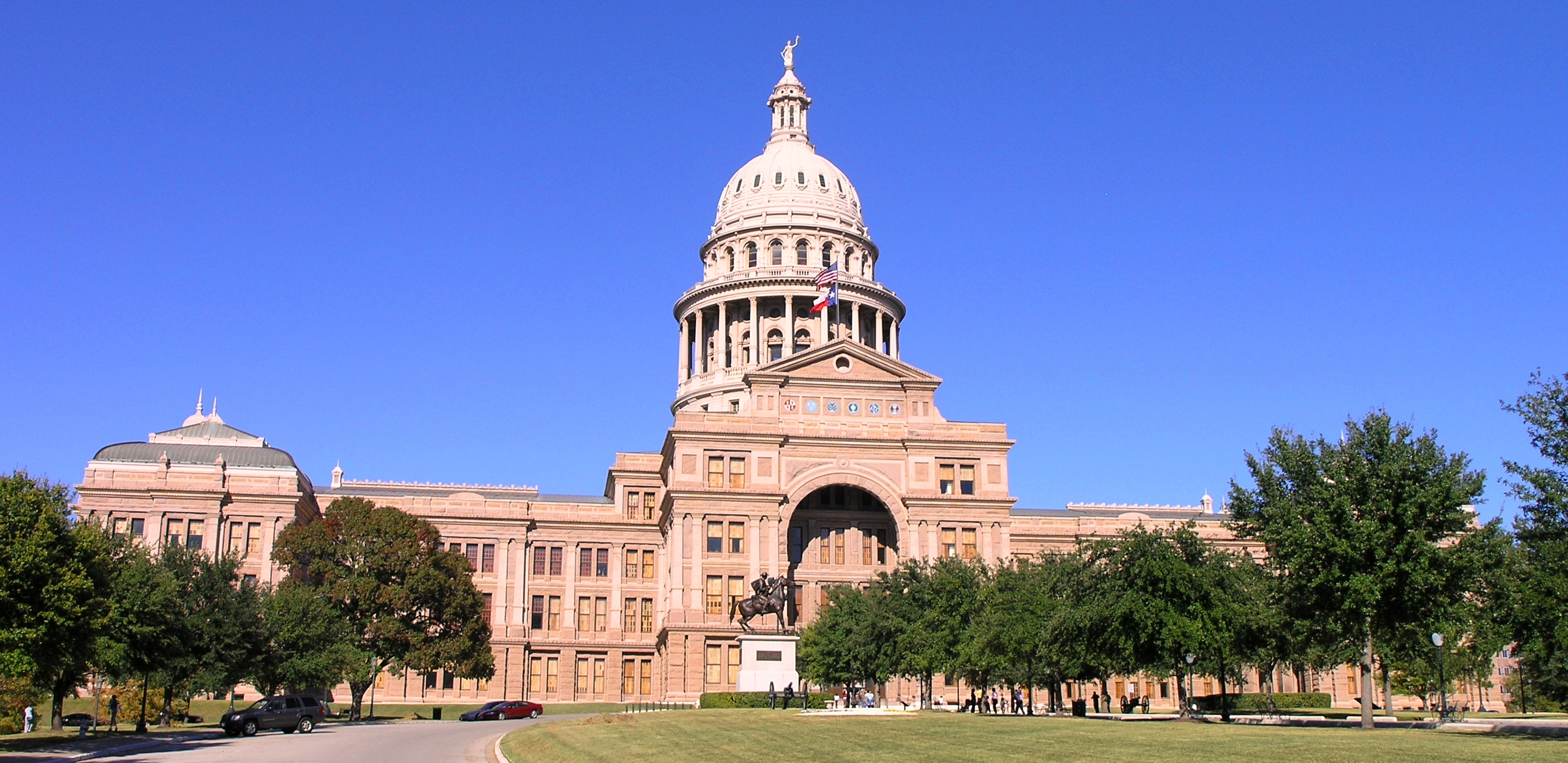
Capitol Building from the south

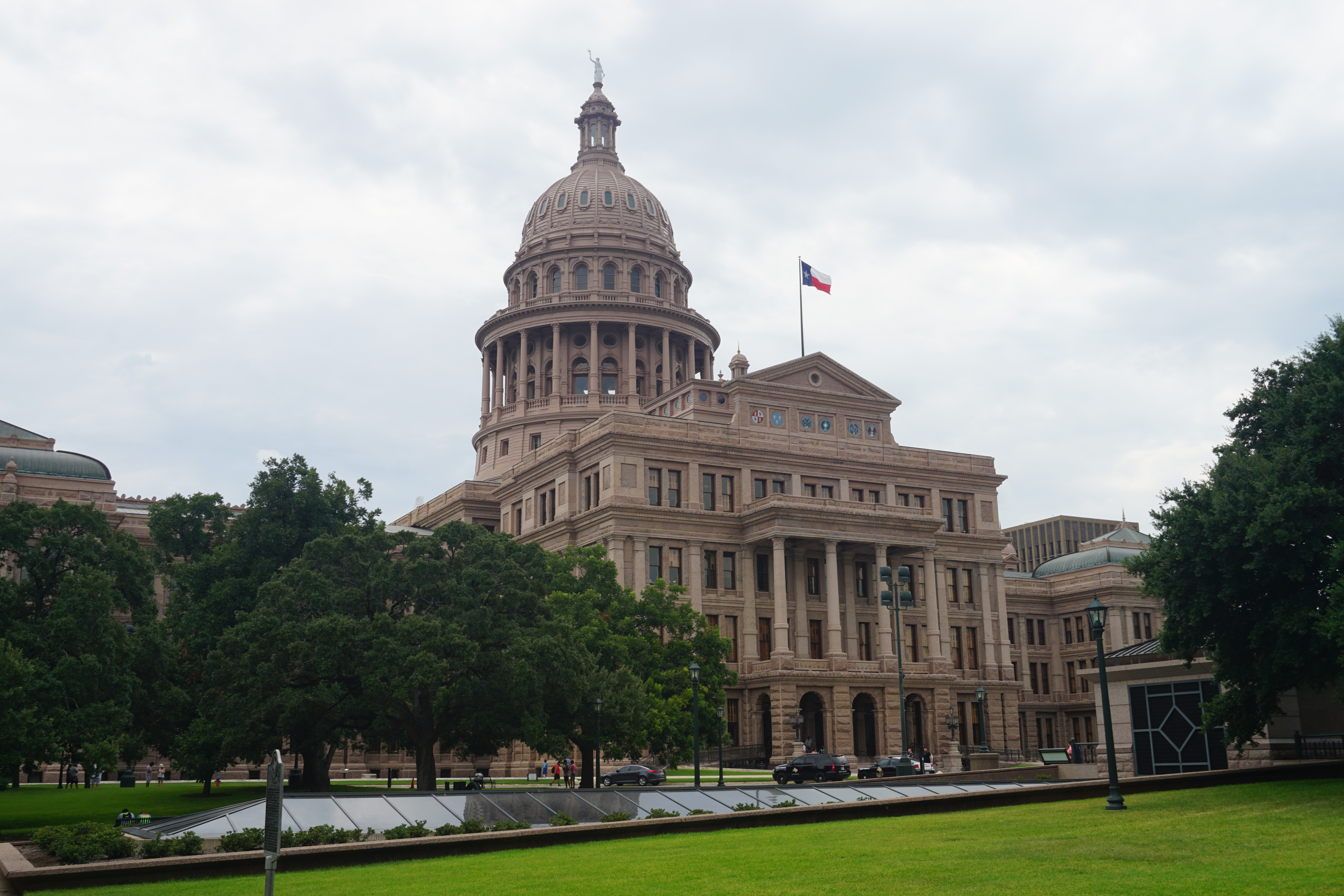
Capitol Building from the north

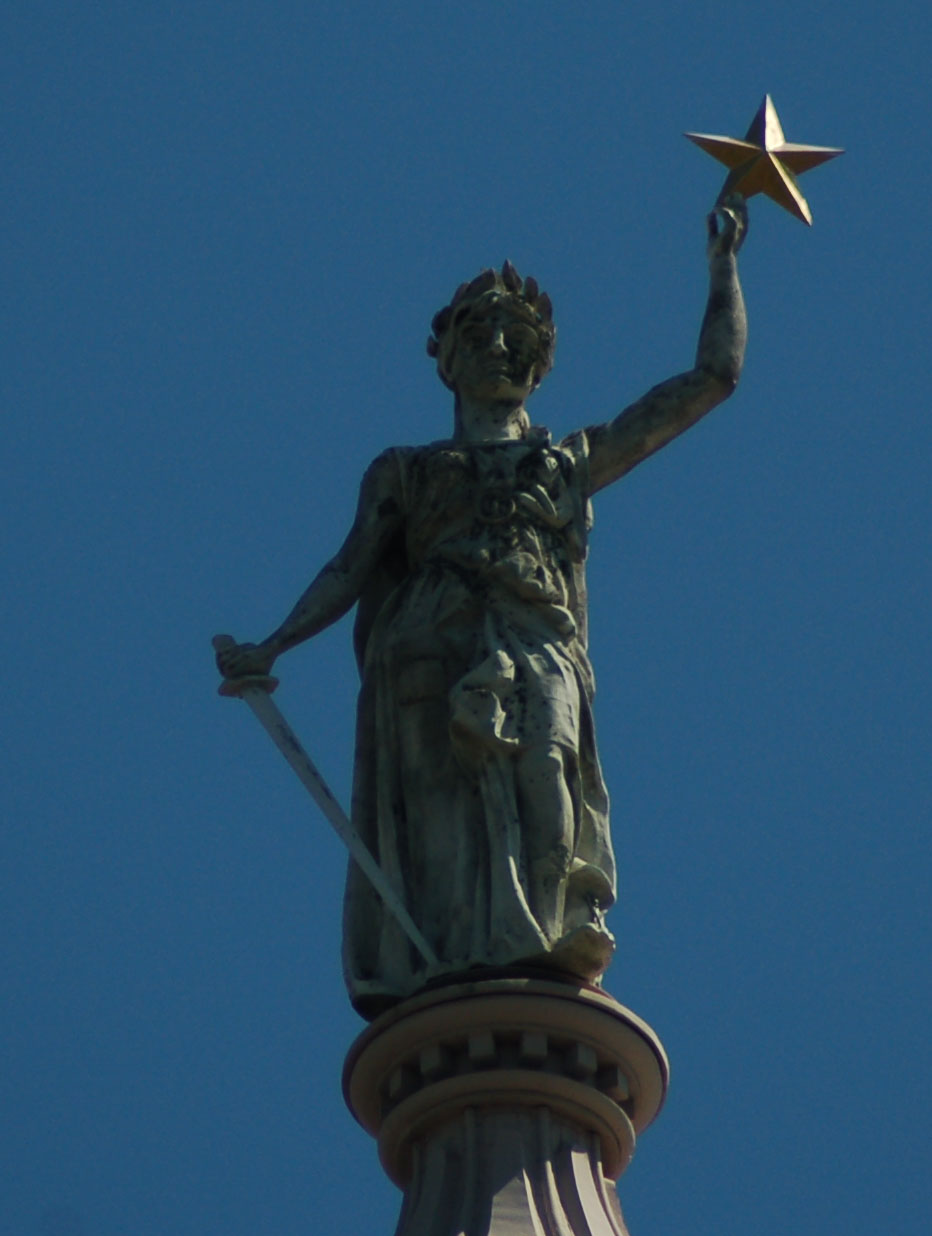
Goddess of Liberty statue atop the building

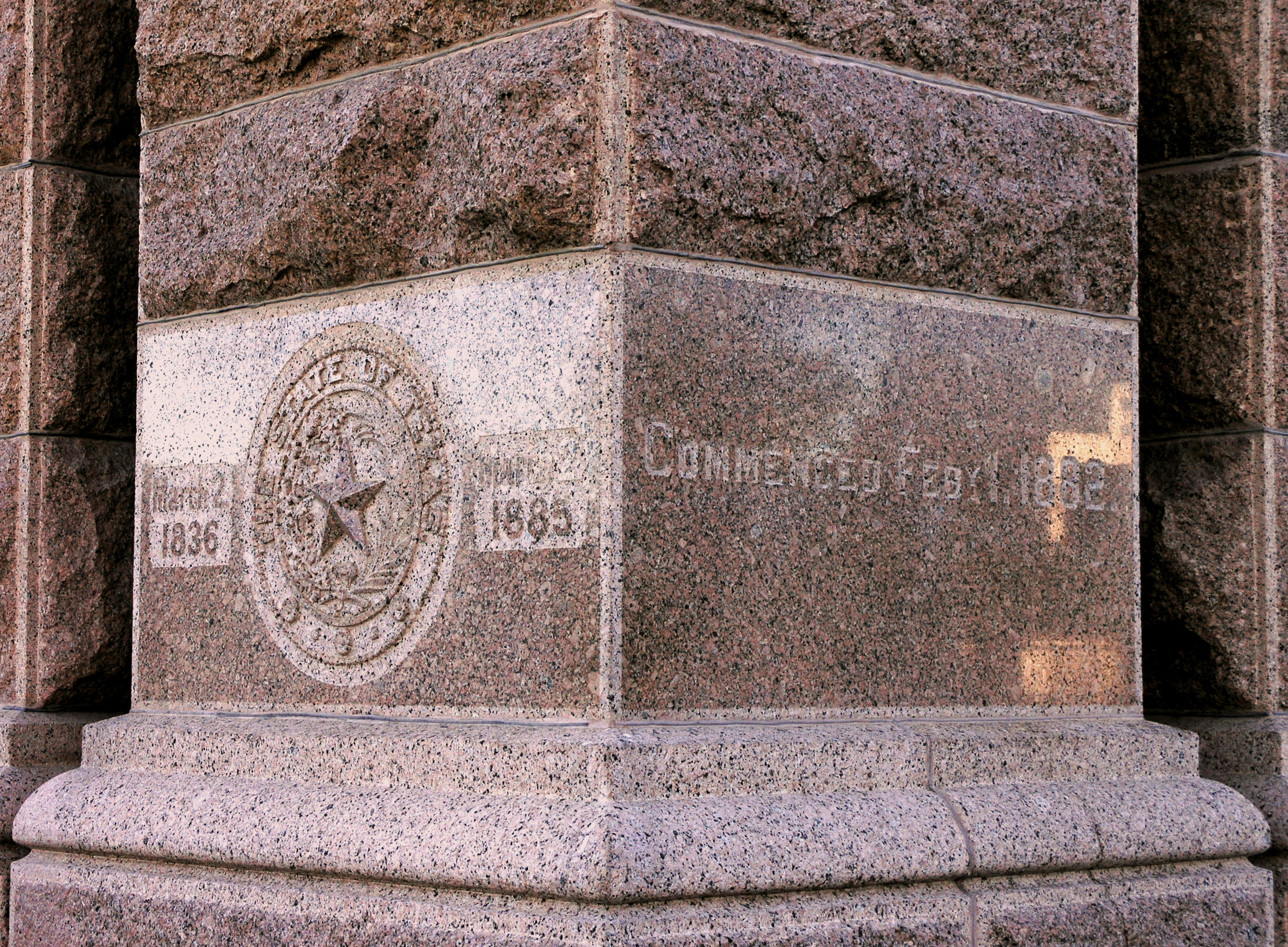
Cornerstone of Texas State Capitol building

=== Interior ===
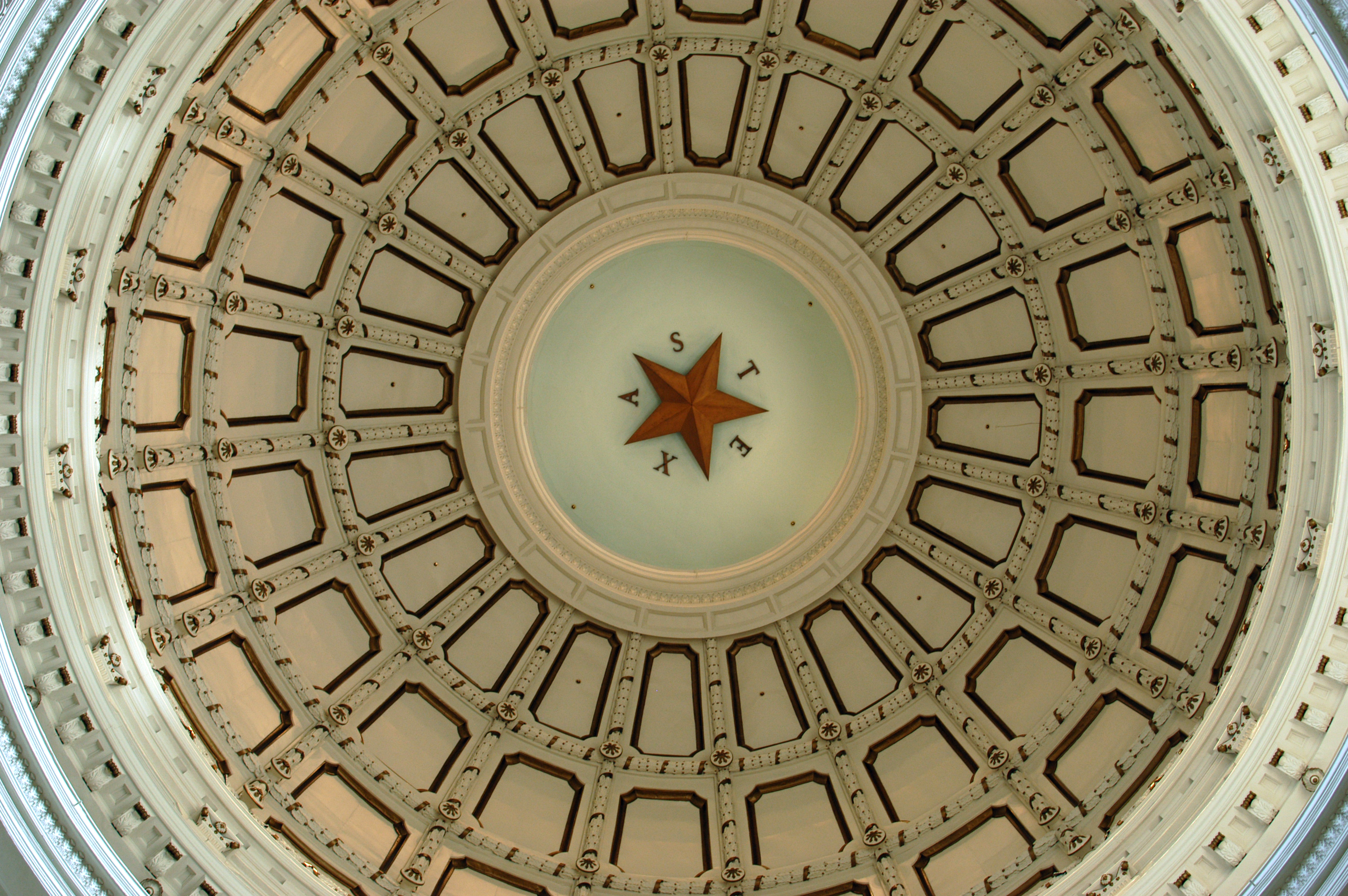
The Capitol dome's interior

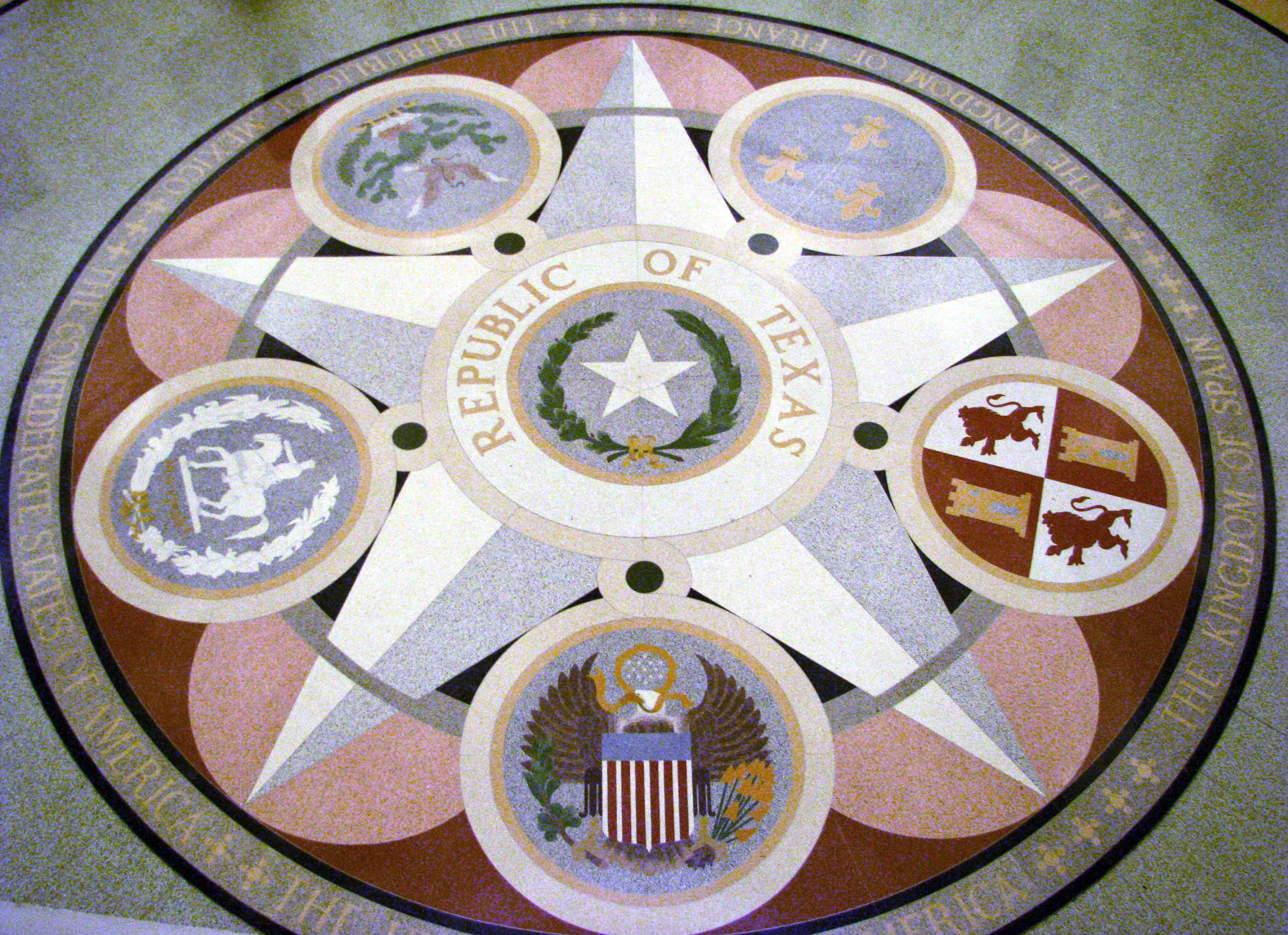
Terrazzo mosaic depicting the seals of the six nations that have governed Texas

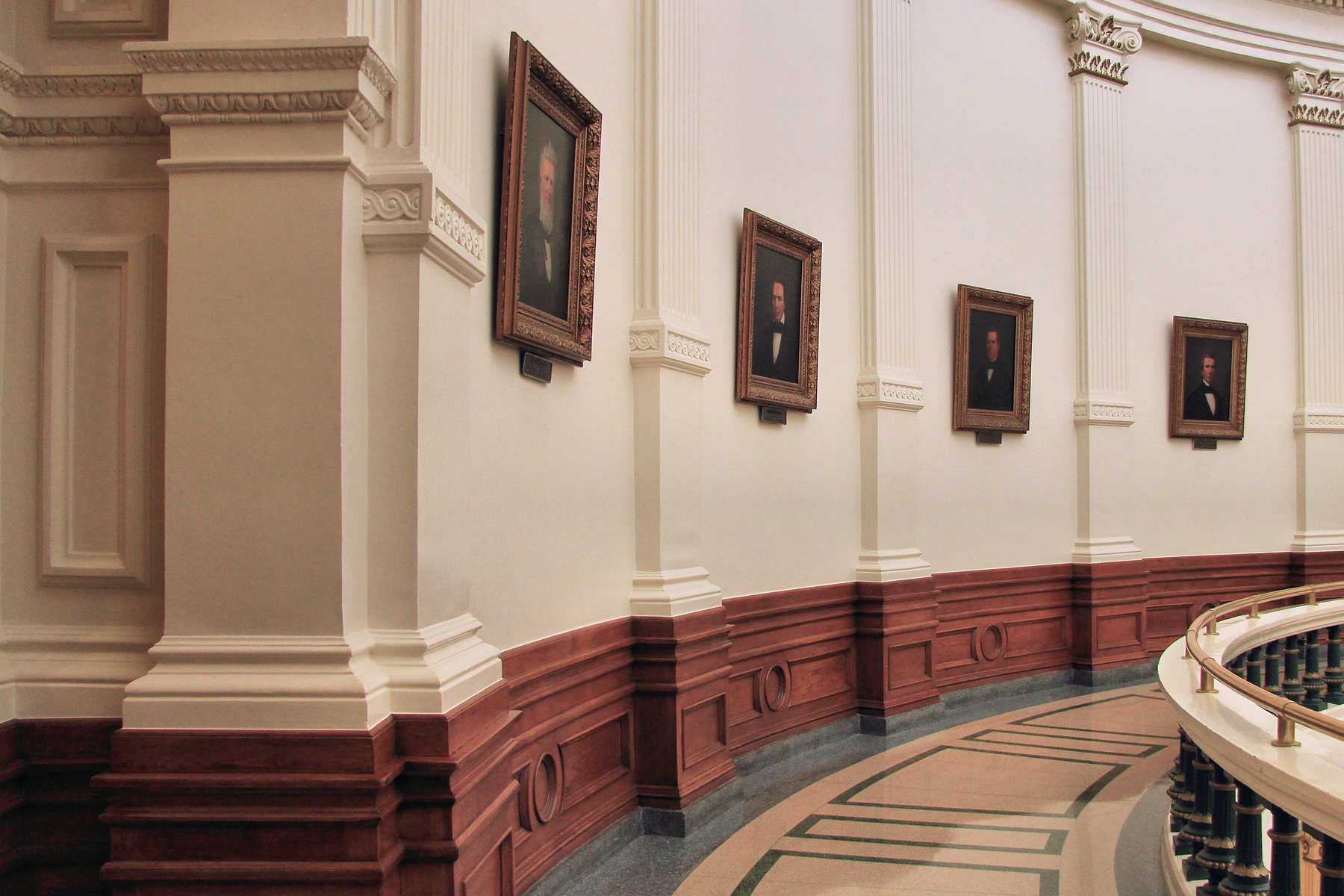
Portraits lining the rotunda

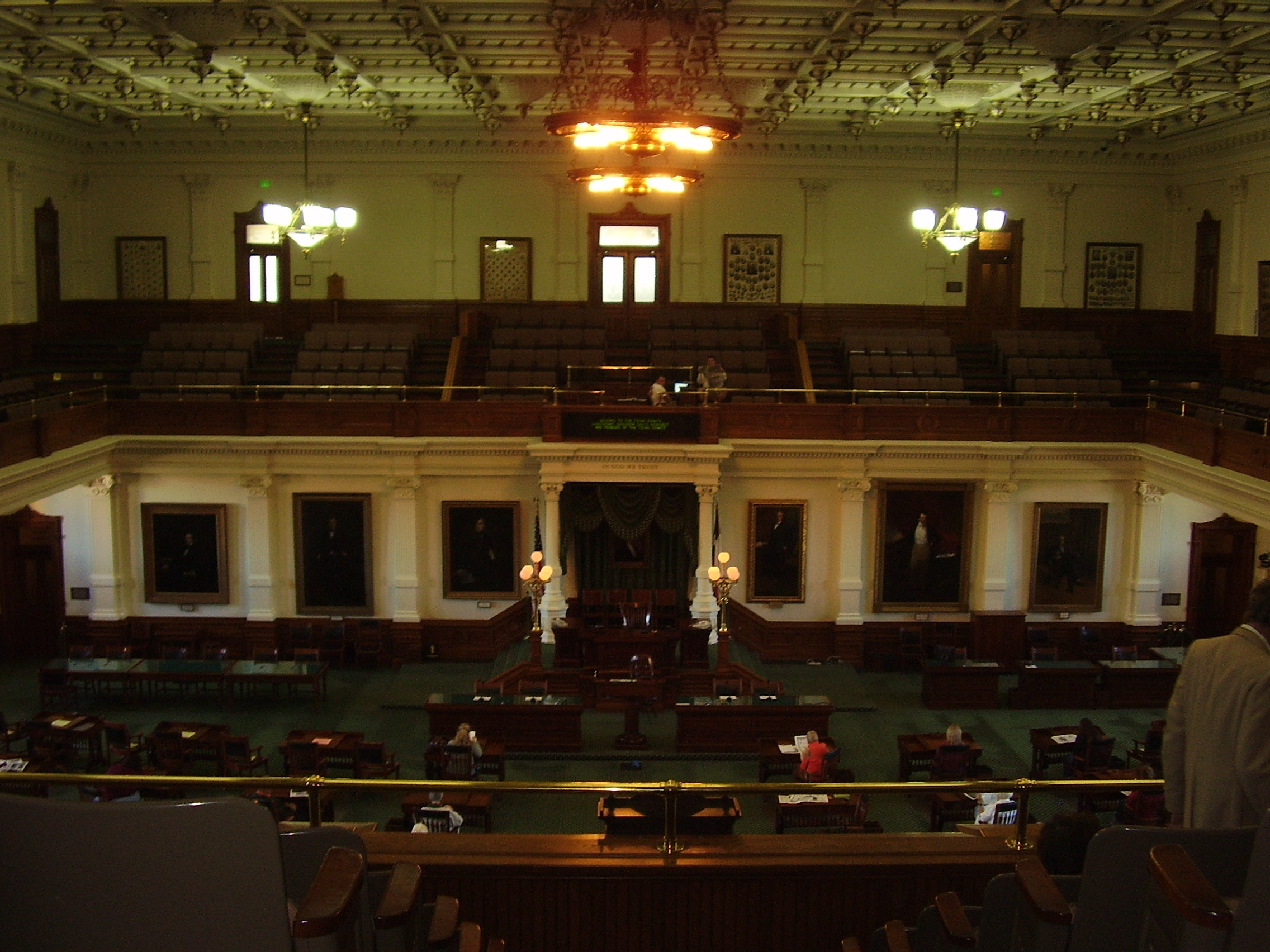
Texas Senate Chamber

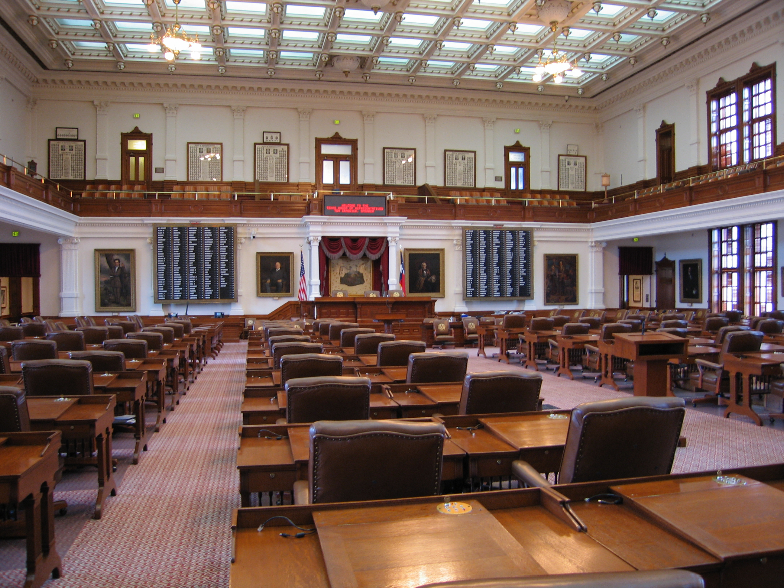
The Texas House of Representatives Chamber

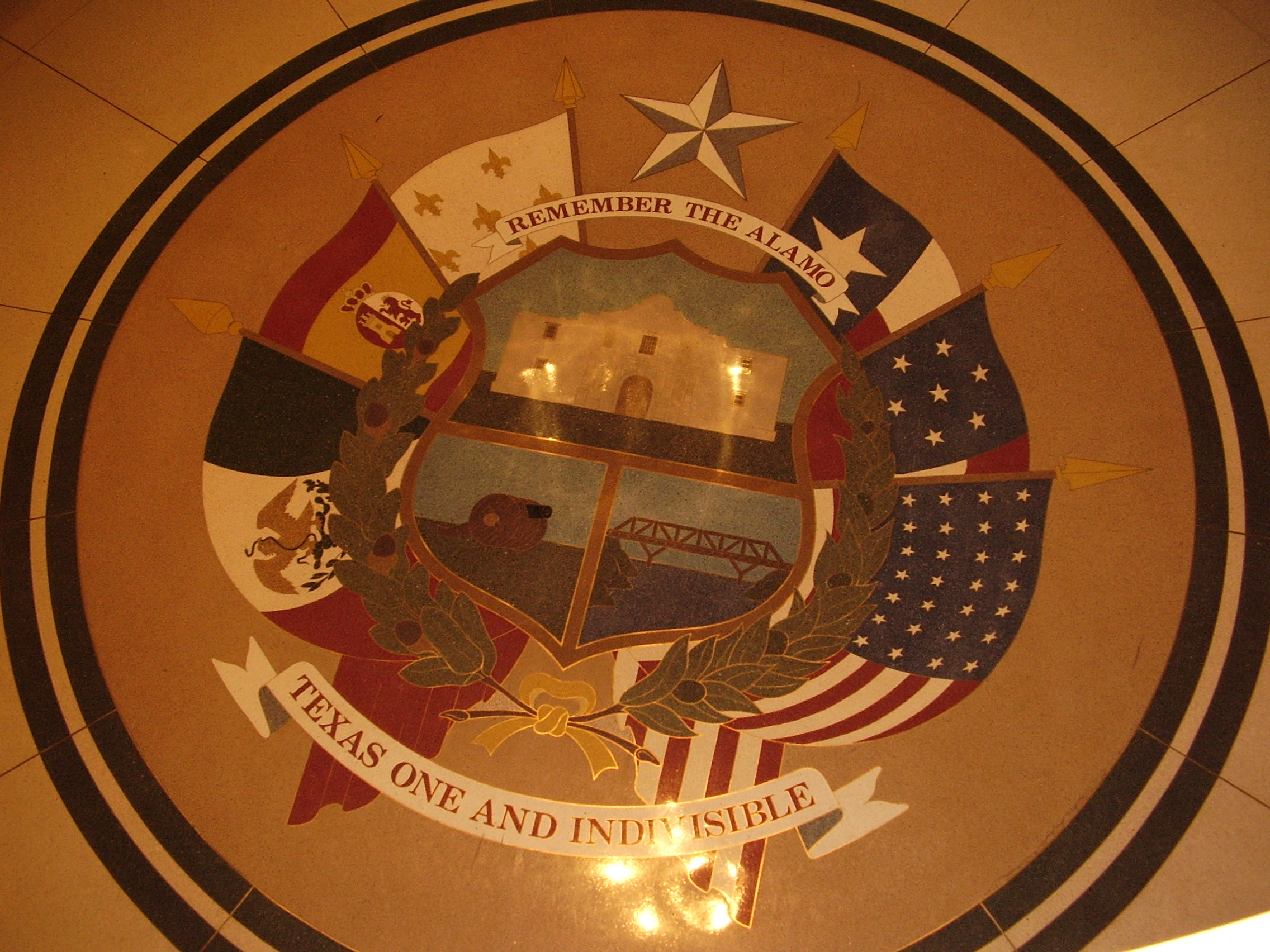
Terrazzo mosaic of reverse seal of Texas in the capitol extension, showing the six flags of Texas

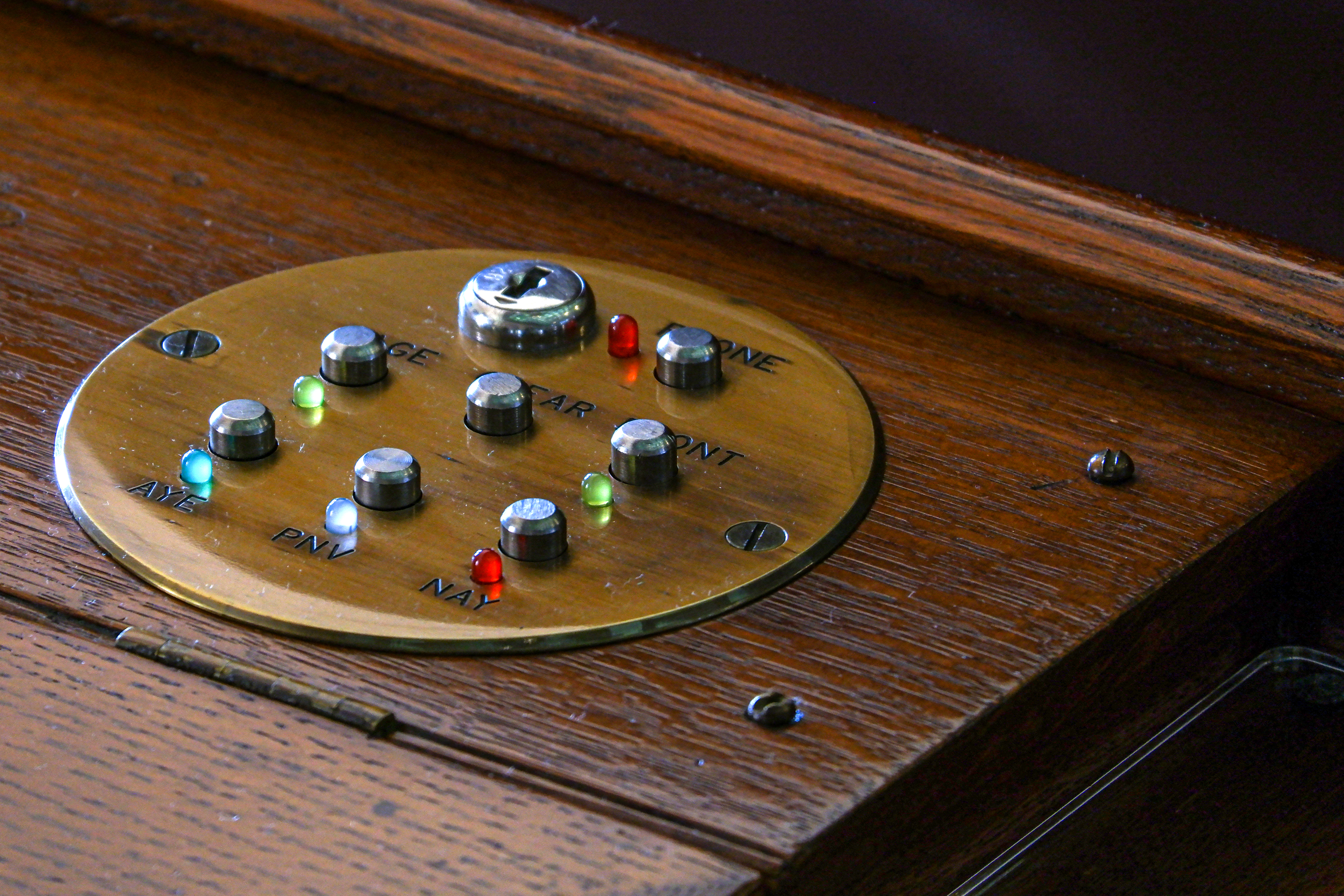
Voting button panel in the Texas House of Representatives

=== Grounds ===
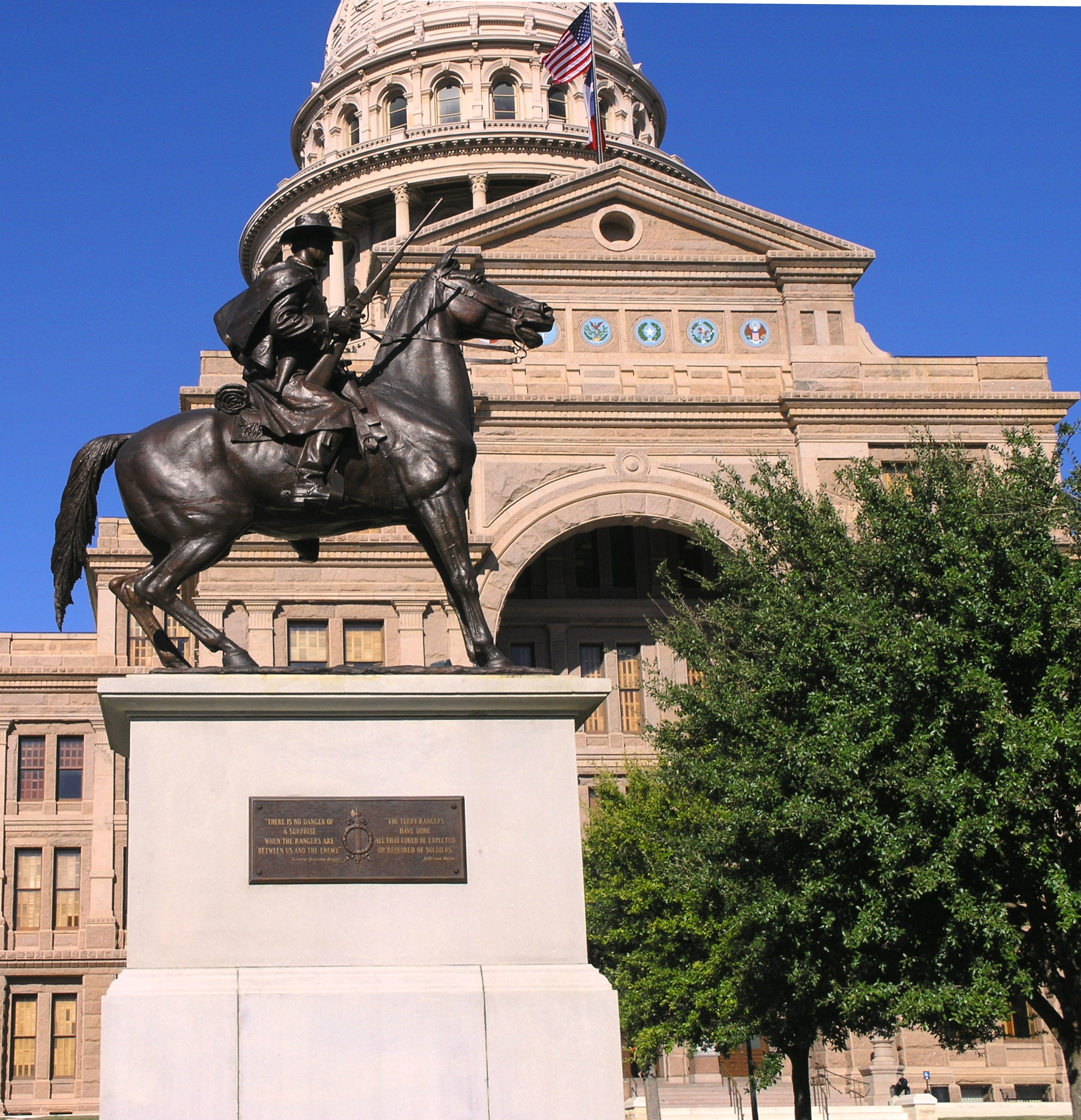
Terry's Texas Rangers Monument

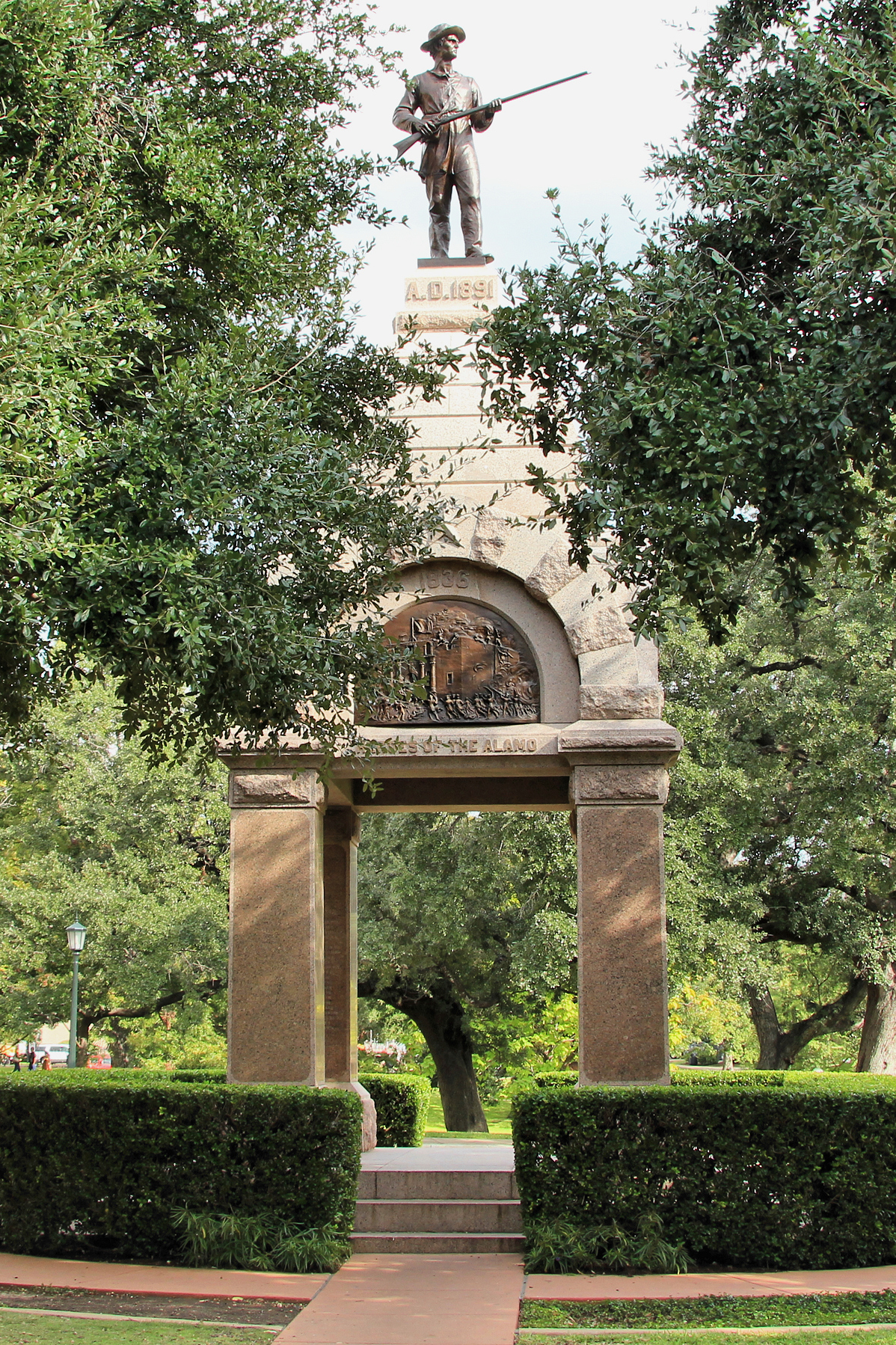
Heroes of the Alamo Monument

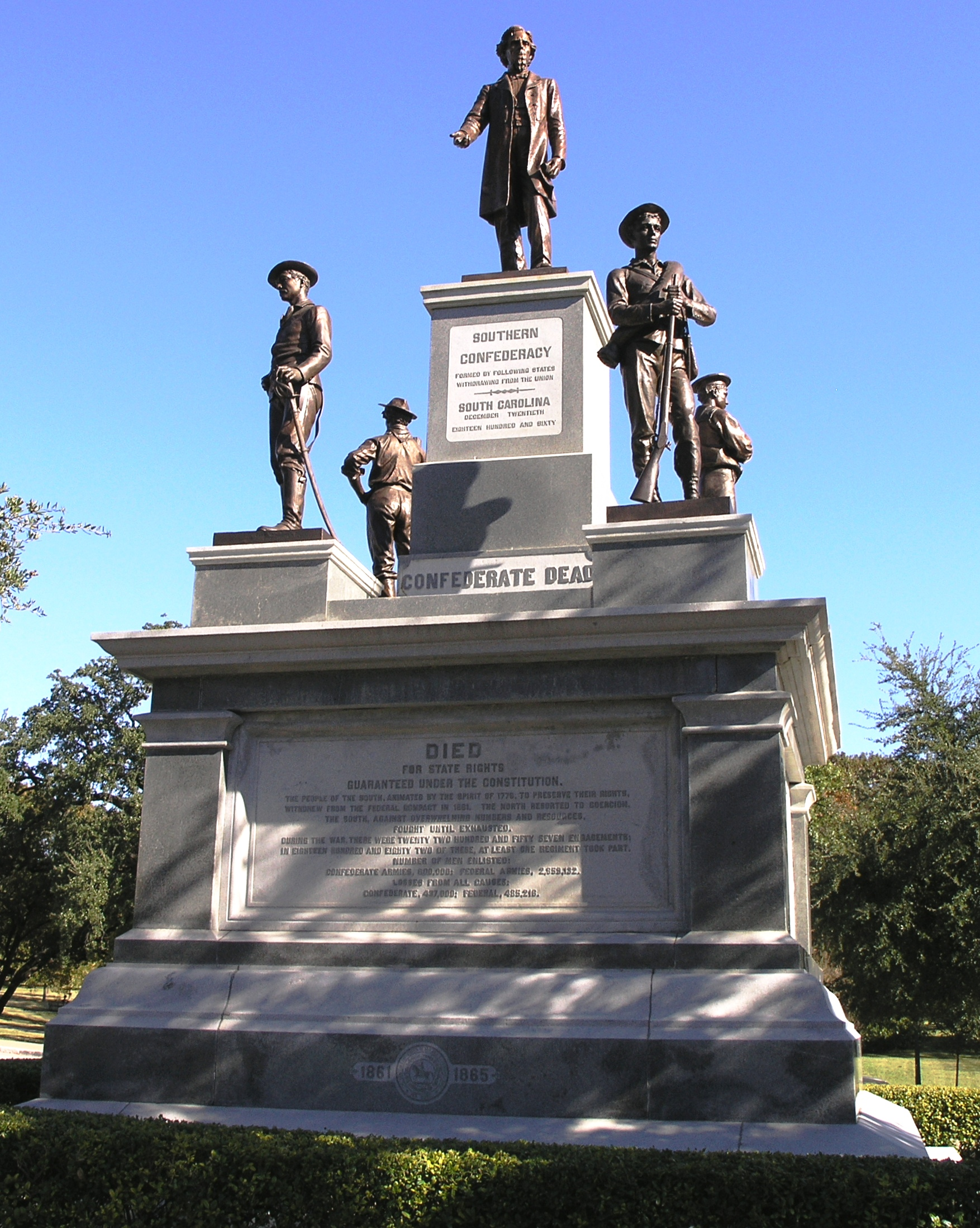
Confederate Soldiers Monument

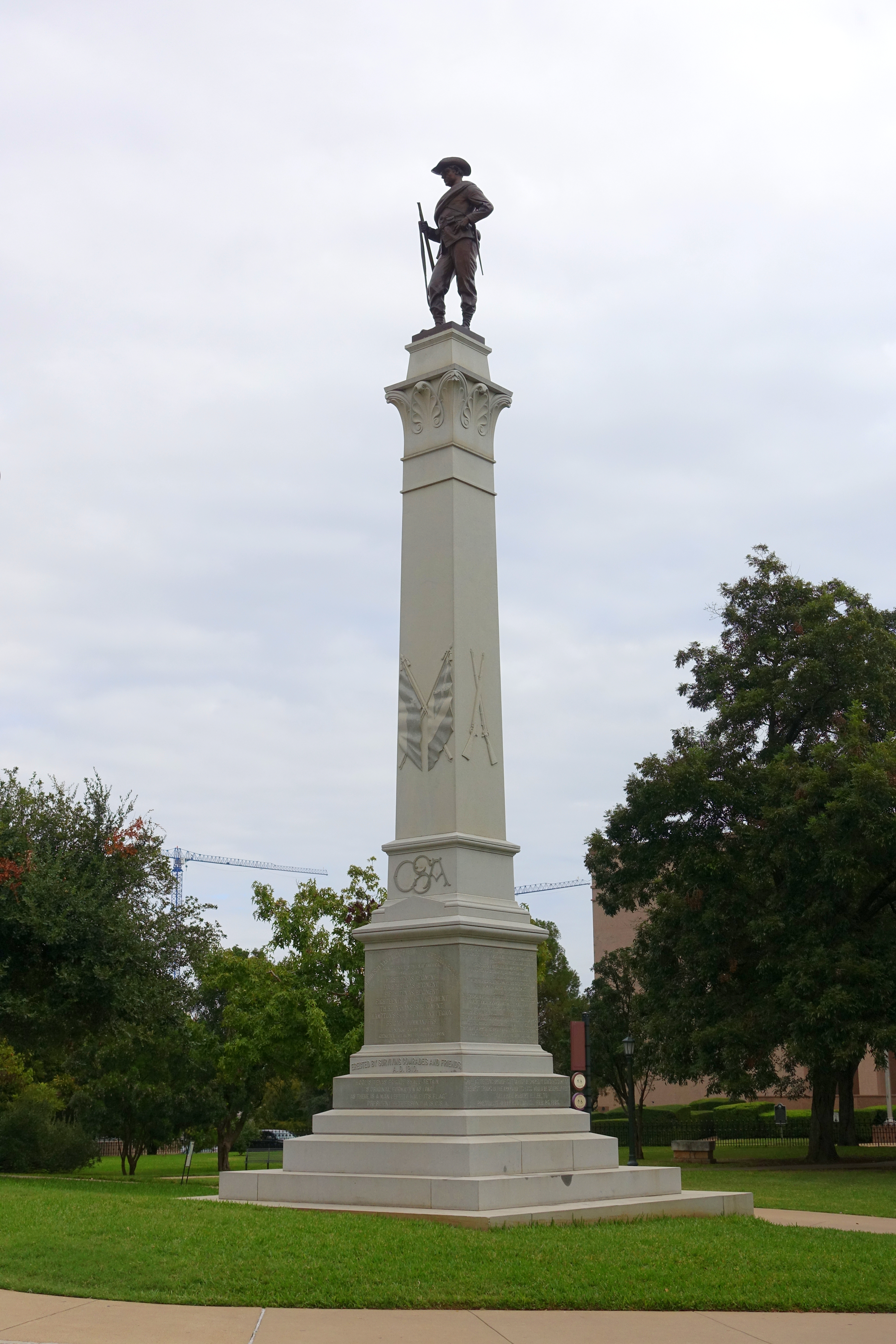
Hood's Texas Brigade Monument

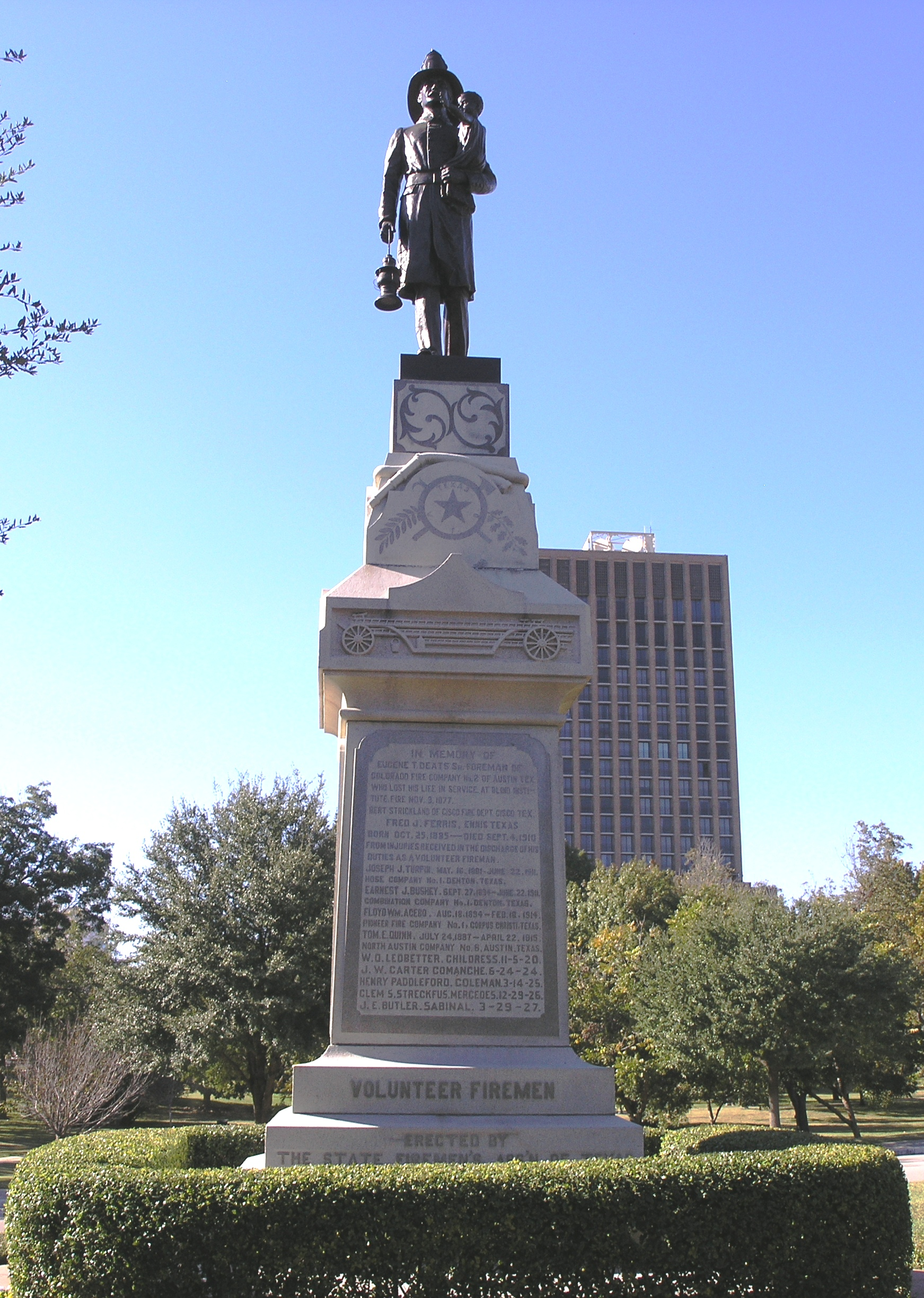
Volunteer Firemen Monument

== See also ==
- List of Texas state legislatures
- List of National Historic Landmarks in Texas
- List of Recorded Texas Historic Landmarks (Sabine-Travis)
- National Register of Historic Places listings in Travis County, Texas
- List of tallest domes
- Capitol and Downtown Austin Parking

Preceded by Unknown	Tallest Building in Austin; 1888–1972; 95 m	Succeeded by Dobie Center
