= Littlefield =

Littlefield may refer to:

== Jurisdictions in the United States ==
- Littlefield, Arizona
- Littlefield, Texas
- Littlefield Township, Michigan

== Other ==
- Littlefield (surname)
- Institutions:
  - In Arizona (in or near town of Littlefield): Littlefield Unified School District
  - In Texas:
    - In or near city of Austin:
      - Littlefield Fountain
      - Littlefield House
    - In or near town of Littlefield in Lamb County:
      - Littlefield Municipal Airport
      - Littlefield Independent School District

== See also ==
- Littleton (disambiguation)
