= Maroon =

Reddish-brown color

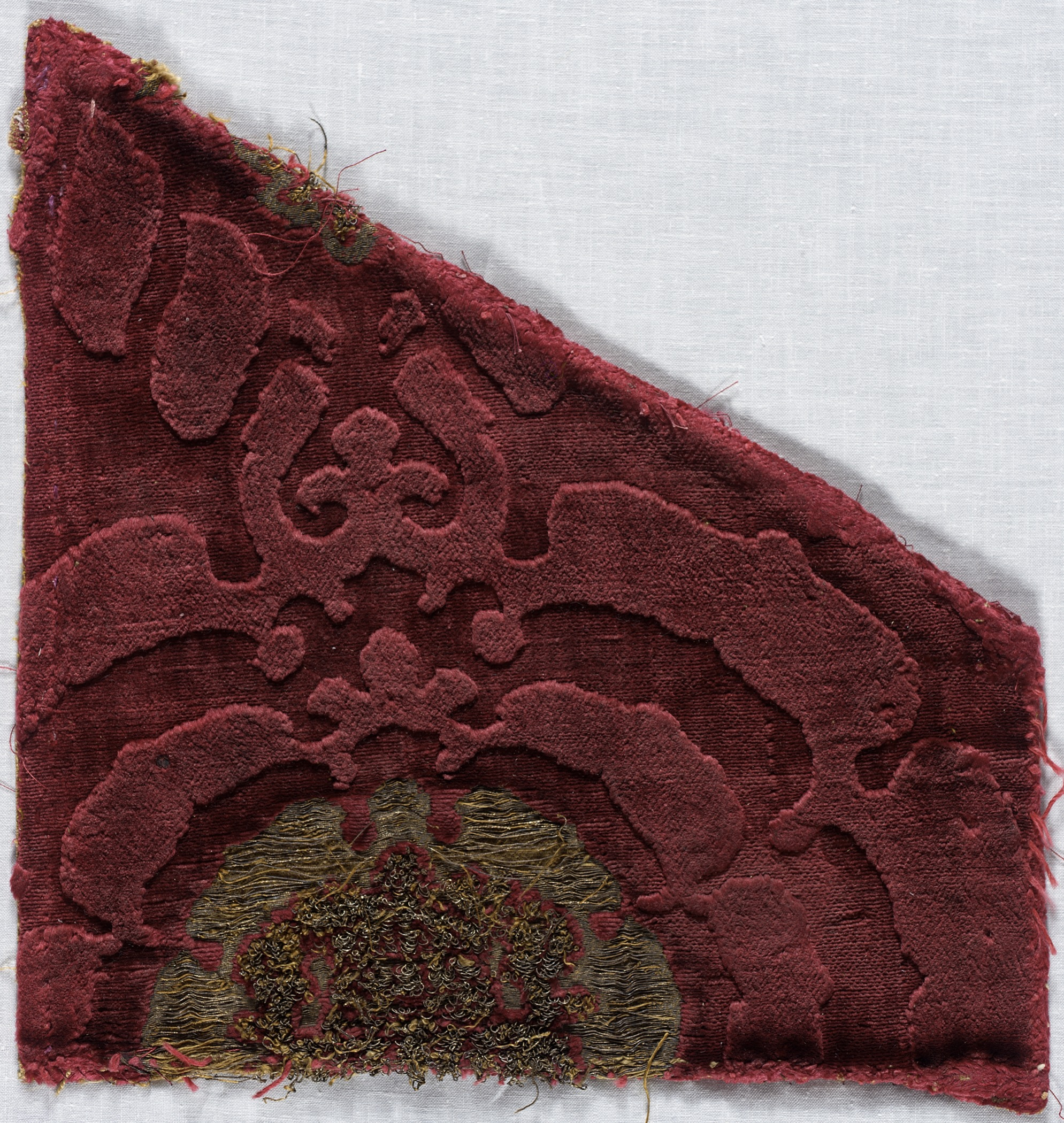
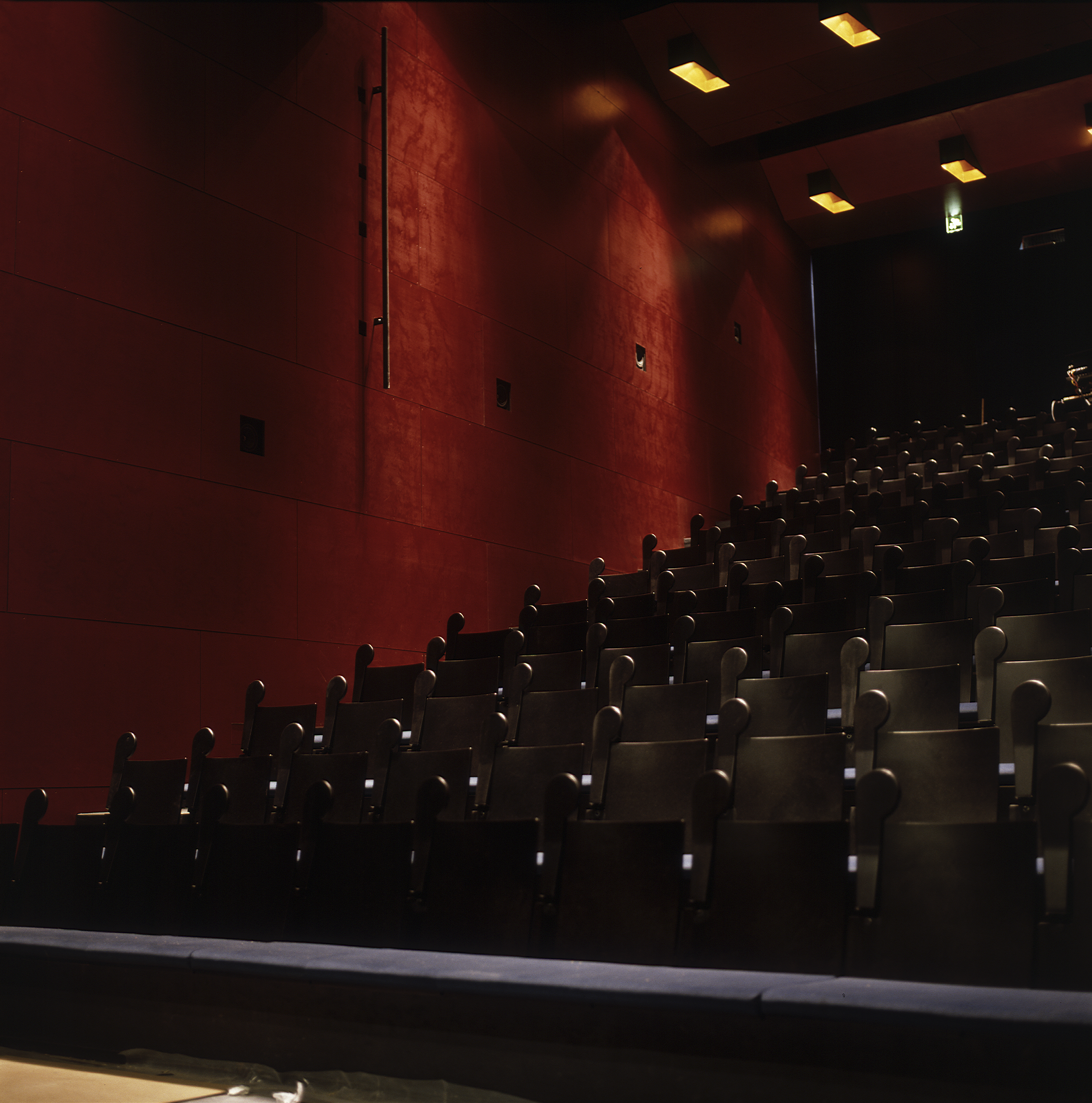
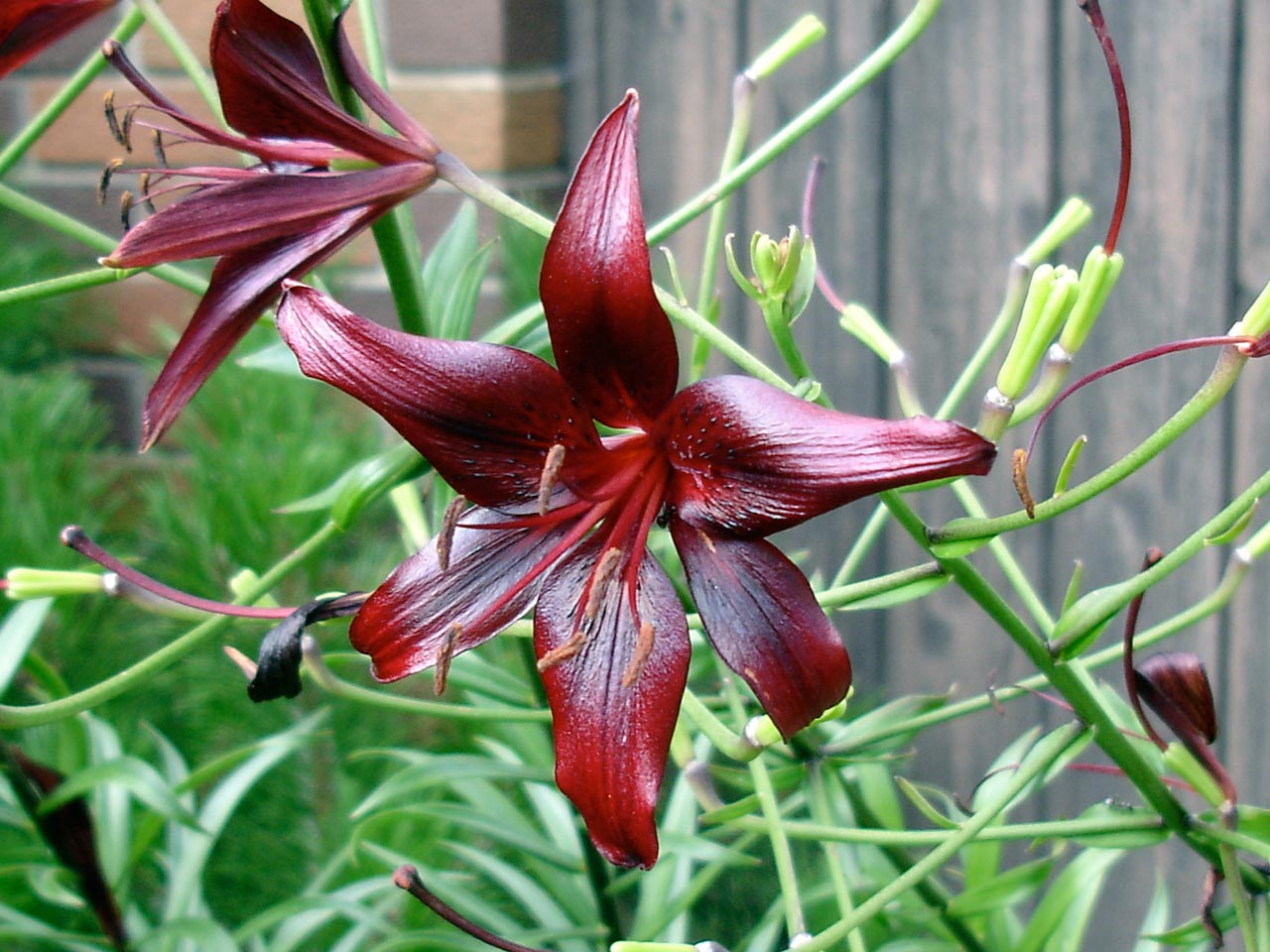
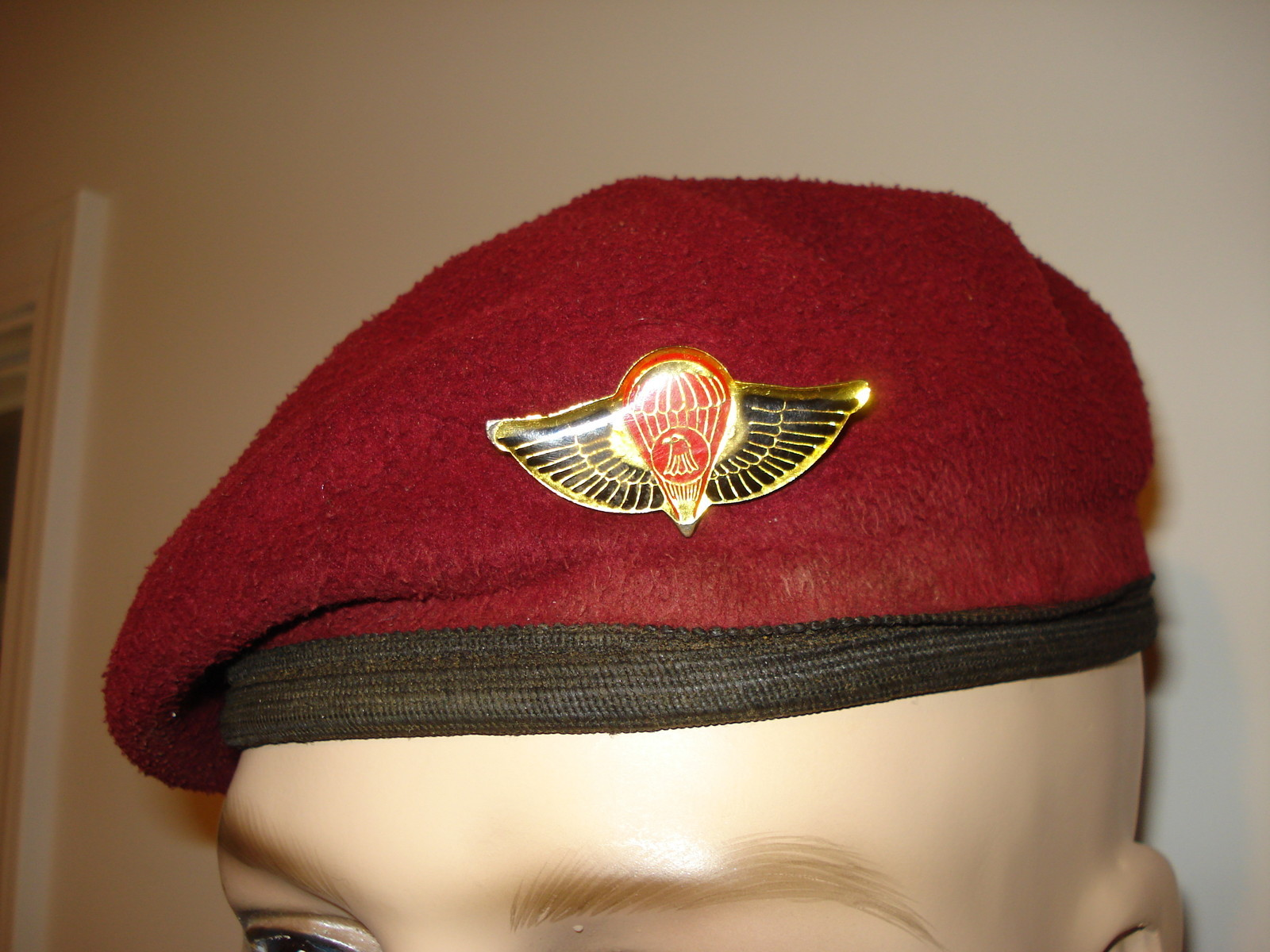
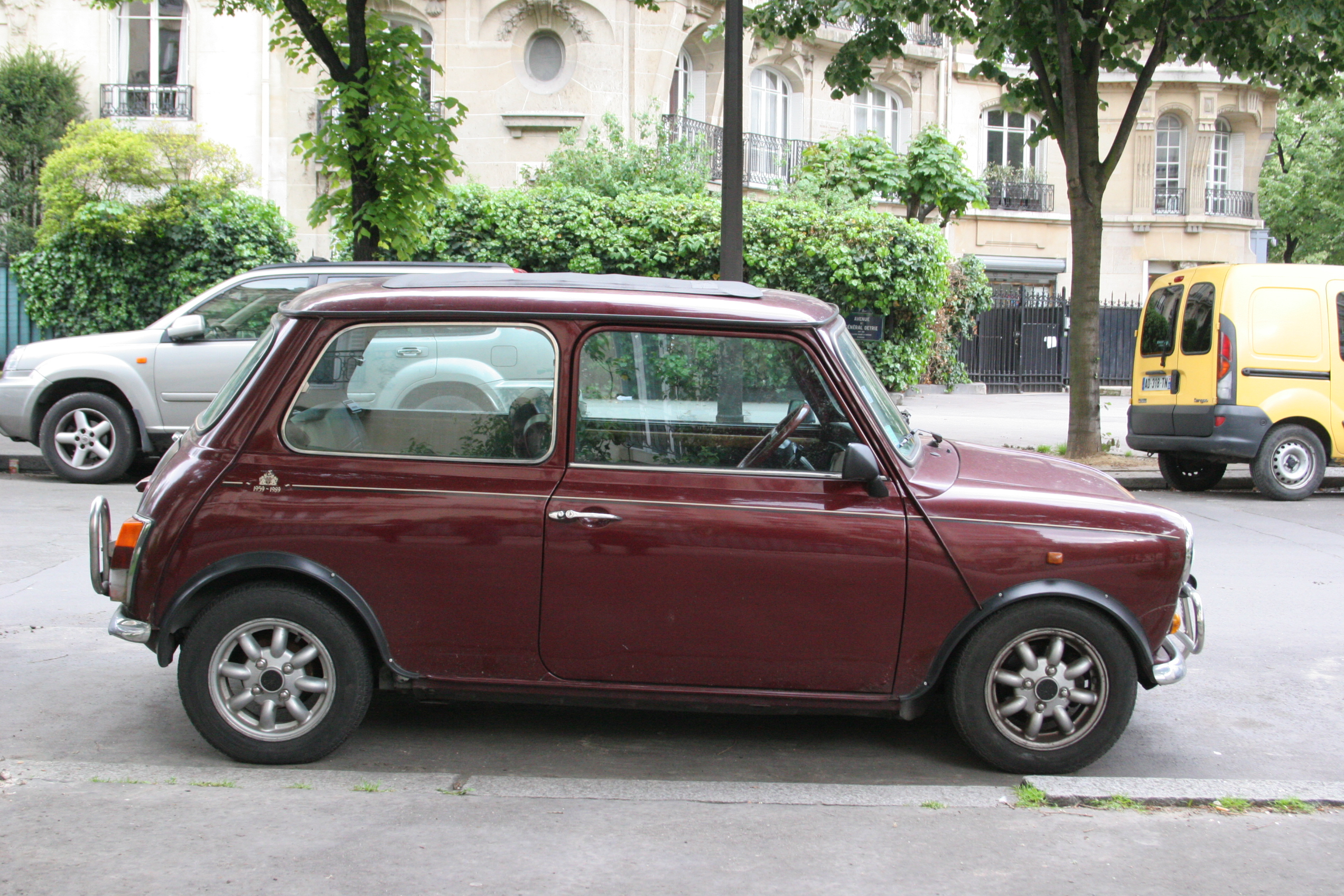
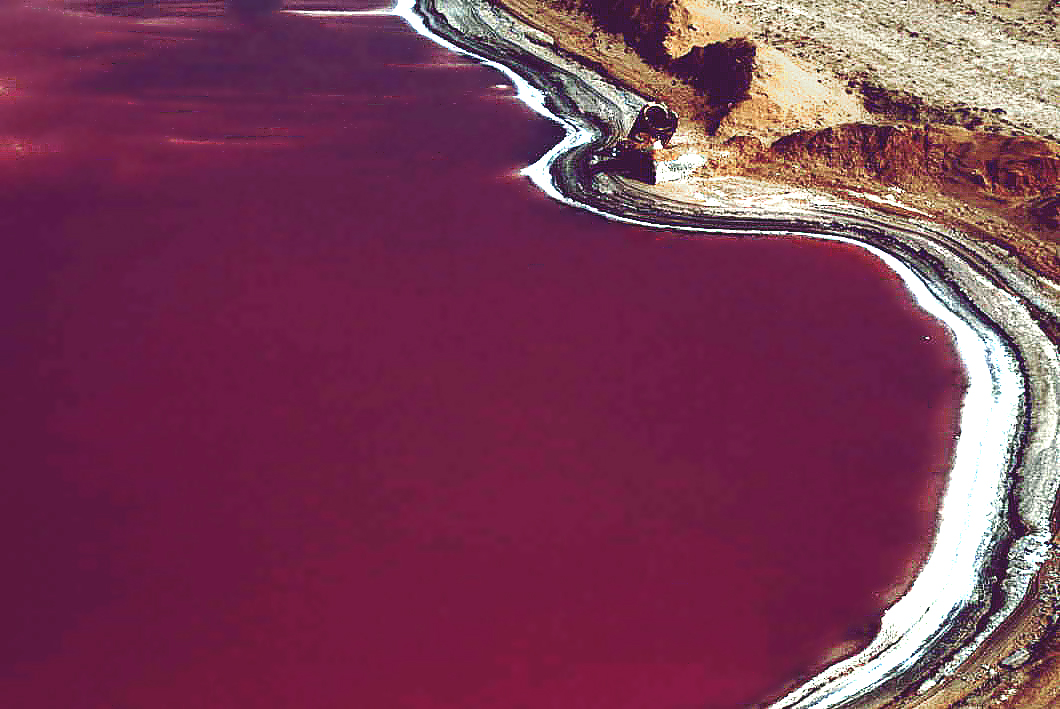
- Clockwise, from top left: Portion of silk velvet; The Kiasma auditorium in Helsinki; Beret worn by the Iraqi Armed Forces; Salt flats of Walvis Bay; Parked Mini; Maroon lilies.

Color coordinates
- Hex triplet: #800000
- sRGB^{B} (r, g, b): (128, 0, 0)
- HSV (h, s, v): (0°, 100%, 50%)
- CIELCh_{uv} (L, C, h): (26, 86, 12°)
- Source: HTML/CSS
- ISCC–NBS descriptor: Deep reddish brown
- B: Normalized to [0–255] (byte); H: Normalized to [0–100] (hundred)

Maroon (US: UK: /məˈruːn/ mə-ROON, Australia: /məˈroʊn/ mə-ROHN) is a brownish red color that takes its name from the French word marron, meaning chestnut. Marron is also one of the French translations for "brown".

Terms describing interchangeable shades, with overlapping RGB ranges, include burgundy, claret, mulberry, and crimson.

Different dictionaries define maroon differently. The Cambridge English Dictionary defines maroon as a dark reddish-purple color while its "American Dictionary" section defines maroon as dark brown-red. Lexico online dictionary defines maroon as a brownish-red. Similarly, Dictionary.com defines maroon as a dark brownish-red. The Shorter Oxford English Dictionary describes maroon as "a brownish-crimson or claret colour," while the Merriam-Webster online dictionary simply defines it as a dark red.

In the sRGB color model for additive color representation, the web color called maroon is created by turning down the brightness of pure red to about one half. It is also noted that maroon is the complement of the web color called teal.

== Etymology ==
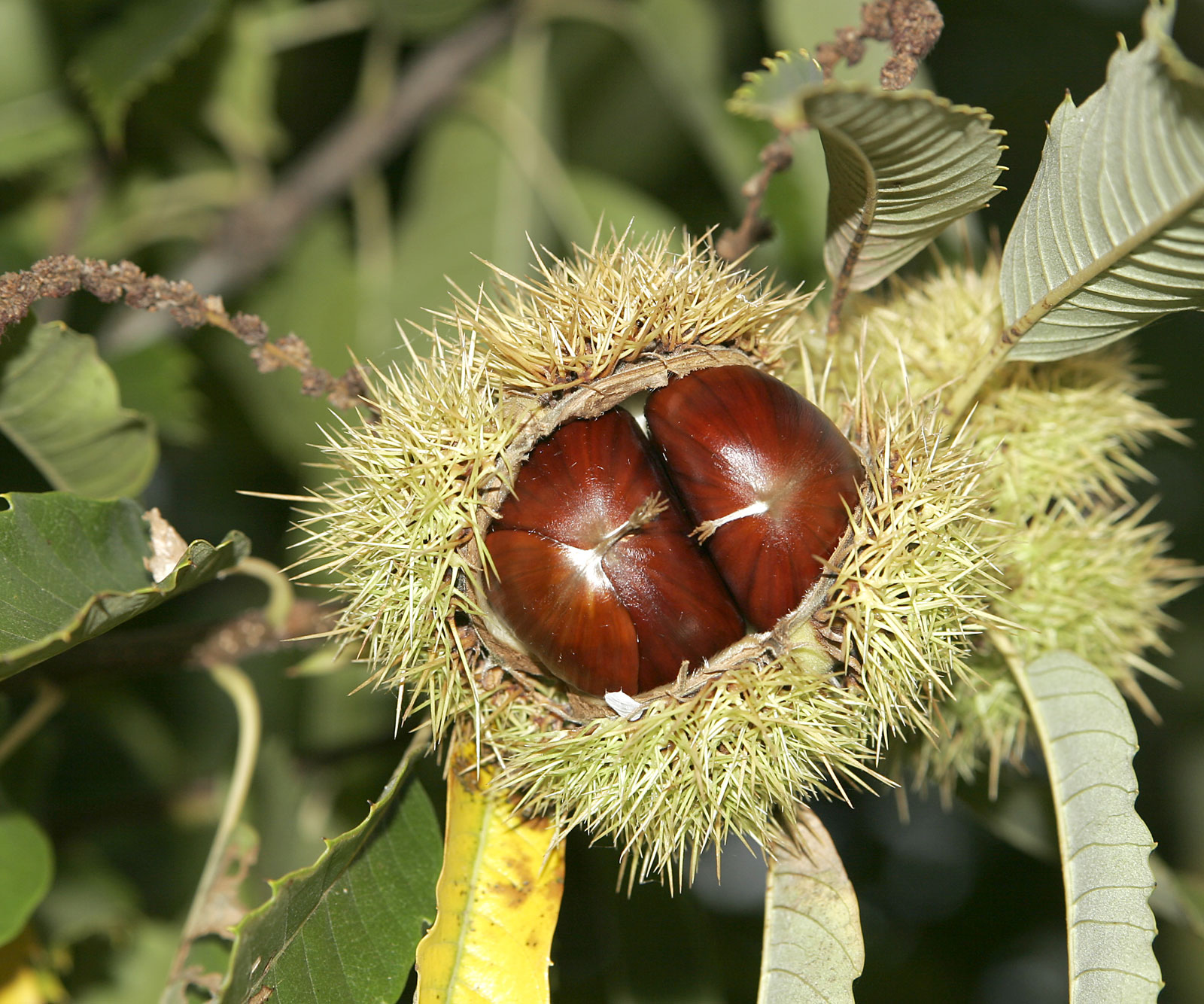
The word "maroon" derives from the French marron, meaning "chestnut".

Maroon is French marron ("chestnut"), itself from the Italian marrone that also means "chestnut" and "brown" from the medieval Greek maraon.

The first recorded use of maroon as a color name in English was in 1789.

== In culture ==
Religion

- Vajrayana Buddhist monks, such as the Dalai Lama, wear maroon robes.
- Maroon, along with golden yellow, is worn in the Philippines by Catholic devotees of the Black Nazarene, especially during its procession on 9 January.

National symbols

- Maroon and white are the colors of the Flag of Qatar.
- Flag of Phoenix, Arizona is maroon and white.
- Maroon, gold, teal and orange are the colors of the Flag of Sri Lanka.
- The Flag of Latvia has sometimes been called maroon and white, although the officially declared colors were red and white, (Note: According to the 1994 law, Latvijas valsts karogs ir sarkans ar baltu svītru. (Latvian national flag is red with a white stripe.) Sarkans is the word for "red" in Latvian, while "maroon" is petarde.) and in 2009 were amended to carmine and white.
- Maroon was named as the official color of the state of Queensland, Australia, in November 2003. While the declared shade of maroon in sRGB is R=115, G=24, B=44, Queenslanders display the spirit of the state by wearing all shades of maroon at sporting and cultural events.

Politics

- Maroon is the color of the Dutch far-right political party Forum for Democracy.

Military

- The distinctive maroon beret has been worn by many airborne forces around the world, starting with the British Parachute Regiment (nicknamed the "Maroon Machine") in 1942. It is sometimes referred to as the "red beret."
- Historically, maroon was the distinguishing color of the Caçadores (rifle) regiments of the Portuguese Army.

Business

- Maroon is the signature color of the Japanese private rail company Hankyu Railway, decided by a vote of women customers in 1923. In the 1990s, Hankyu planned an alternative color as it was developing new vehicles. That plan was called off following opposition by local residents.

Music

- The Famous Maroon Band
- Maroon 5
- "Maroon" by Taylor Swift

School colors
Many universities, colleges, high schools and other educational institutions have maroon as one of their school colors. Popular combinations include maroon and white, maroon and grey, maroon and gold, and maroon and blue.

- Maroon and White are the official school colors of Fordham University.
- Maroon and White are the official school colors of Texas A&M University.
- Maroon and Gold are the official school colors of Texas State University
- Maroon and Gold are the official school colors of Boston College.
- Maroon and Gold are the official school colors of the University of Minnesota.
- Maroon and Gold are the official school colors of the Central Michigan University.
- Maroon and Gold are the official school colors of Shimer College, representing Mount Carroll Seminary.
- Maroon is the official school color of the University of Chicago. The school also employs light and dark gray in its official primary color palette.
- Maroon and White are the official school colors of Lower Merion High School.
- Maroon and White are the official school colors of Mississippi State University and the name of the university's alma mater.
- Maroon and White are the official school colors of Colgate University.
- Maroon and White are the official school colors of Missouri State University.
- Maroon and White are the official school colors of Littlefield High School
- Maroon and White are the official school colors of University of Massachusetts Amherst
- Maroon and Gold are the official school colors of Arizona State University and the name of the university's fight song.
- Maroon and Black are the official school colors of Cumberland University.
- Maroon and Black are the official school colors of Southern Illinois University Carbondale.
- Maroon and Orange are the official school colors of Virginia Tech.
- Maroon and Orange are the official school colors of Crooms Academy of Information Technology.
- Maroon and Gold are the official colors of Elon University.
- Maroon and Blue are the official colors of Port Rex Technical High School in South Africa.
- Maroon and Forest Green are the primary and complementary institutional colors of the University of the Philippines System.
- Maroon and Gold are the school colors of the University of Perpetual Help System DALTA in the Philippines

Sports
Sports teams often use maroon as one of their identifying colors, as a result, many have received the nickname "Maroons."

- The University of Chicago Maroons have used the nickname (and the corresponding color) since a vote came at a meeting of students and faculty on May 5, 1894.
- The University of the Philippines Fighting Maroons competes in the University Athletic Association of the Philippines and is based in their Diliman Campus. The moniker has been associated with their teams since the 1930s, except for a brief period in the 1960s when they were known as the Parrots.
- The University of Perpetual Help Altas , playing in the National Collegiate Athletic Association (Philippines) use the color as their primary uniform, derived from their school colors .
- Heart of Midlothian F.C. have played in predominantly maroon colours since 1877, although they had maroon badge and trimmings in their first kit from their formation in 1874.
- Official colour of Italian association football team Torino F.C. Club's fans are known as I Granata (the Maroons in Italian).
- Official colour of Argentina's association football team Club Atlético Lanús (Los Granates).
- Official colour of Bulgaria's association football team FC Fratria.
- Maroons was the official nickname of the athletic teams representing Mississippi State College, now Mississippi State University from 1932 until 1961 when it was officially changed to the Bulldogs. Bulldogs had been used as an unofficial nickname as far back as 1905.
- Maroons is also the common nickname for the Queensland Rugby League team when it plays against the Blues (the New South Welshmen) in an annual competition of three games known as the State of Origin series in Australia.
- The "maroon and whites" is a nickname for the Manly Warringah Sea Eagles in the Australian National Rugby League.
- The West Indies wears all maroon clothing in limited-overs cricket whilst in Test cricket, they wear maroon cricket caps.
- Galway and Westmeath wears primarily maroon clothing when playing home Gaelic Athletic Association matches.
- In North American thoroughbred horse racing, the number 14 horse uses a maroon saddle cloth with the number in yellow.
- In pool, the color of the 7 and 15 billiard balls are traditionally maroon.

== Commercial variations of maroon ==
=== Maroon (Crayola) ===
Maroon (Crayola)

Color coordinates
- Hex triplet: #C32148
- sRGB^{B} (r, g, b): (195, 33, 72)
- HSV (h, s, v): (346°, 83%, 76%)
- CIELCh_{uv} (L, C, h): (43, 112, 5°)
- Source: Crayola
- ISCC–NBS descriptor: Vivid red
- B: Normalized to [0–255] (byte)

The color designated as maroon in Crayola crayons since 1958 (when it was renamed from dark red) is a bright medium shade of maroon halfway between brown and rose.

=== Rich maroon (maroon (X11)) ===
Rich maroon [maroon (X11)]

Color coordinates
- Hex triplet: #B03060
- sRGB^{B} (r, g, b): (176, 48, 96)
- HSV (h, s, v): (338°, 73%, 69%)
- CIELCh_{uv} (L, C, h): (42, 82, 355°)
- Source: X11 color names#Color name clashes
- ISCC–NBS descriptor: Strong red
- B: Normalized to [0–255] (byte)

Displayed in the adjacent table is the color rich maroon, i.e. maroon as defined in the X11 color names, which is much brighter and more toned toward rose than the HTML/CSS maroon shown above.

See the chart Color name clashes in the X11 color names article to see those colors that are different in HTML/CSS and X11.

=== Mystic maroon ===
Mystic Maroon

Color coordinates
- Hex triplet: #AD4379
- sRGB^{B} (r, g, b): (173, 67, 121)
- HSV (h, s, v): (329°, 61%, 68%)
- CIELCh_{uv} (L, C, h): (45, 66, 343°)
- Source: Crayola
- B: Normalized to [0–255] (byte)

Displayed at right is the color mystic maroon, one of the colors in the special set of metallic Crayola crayons called Silver Swirls, the colors of which were formulated by Crayola in 1990.

Although this is supposed to be a metallic color, there is no mechanism for displaying metallic colors on a computer.

=== Dark red ===
Dark Red

Color coordinates
- Hex triplet: #8B0000
- sRGB^{B} (r, g, b): (139, 0, 0)
- HSV (h, s, v): (0°, 100%, 55%)
- CIELCh_{uv} (L, C, h): (28, 94, 12°)
- Source: X11
- ISCC–NBS descriptor: Strong reddish brown
- B: Normalized to [0–255] (byte)

The web color dark red is displayed in the adjacent color table.

== See also ==
- List of colors
