= Ralph Schilling =

American football player and university president (1921–1994)

No. 28
- Position: End

Personal information
- Born: July 5, 1921; Morris, Oklahoma, US
- Died: May 9, 1994 (aged 72); McAllen, Texas, US

Career information
- College: Oklahoma City

Career history
- 1946: Buffalo Bisons (AAFC)
- 1946: Washington Redskins

Ralph Franklin Schilling Jr. (July 5, 1921 – May 9, 1994) was an American football offensive lineman in the National Football League (NFL) for the Washington Redskins. Schilling also played in the All-America Football Conference (AAFC) for the Buffalo Bisons. He later became an educator and the president of Pan American University, Texas (which later became the University of Texas: Pan American).

== Early life and education ==
Schilling was born on July 5, 1921 in Morris, Oklahoma and raised in Seminole. He was the son of Mattie (née Crume) and Ralph Franklin Schilling Sr. However, Schilling's father died when he was 3.

Schilling attended the University of Oklahoma. After he broke his ankle, he transferred to Oklahoma City University (OCU). His younger brother Fred also attended OCU. The brothers were expelled in 1941 after an altercation in a Dad's Day game between OCU and Edmond left an official with a broken nose. He obtained a bachelor of arts degree in mathematics from OCU in 1948. He later obtained a masters degree in school administration from the University of Oklahoma, followed by a doctorate in education in 1957 from Texas Tech University.

Schilling served in the US Navy for 3 years, where he also played for the navy football team from 1944-1945.

== Career ==
Schilling played for the Washington Redskins in 1946 before being released and signed by the Buffalo Bisons. He also had a short stint with the San Francisco Clippers. Schilling then worked as an assistant football coach for Oklahoma City University from 1947-1950.

Schilling served as principal of Crosbyton High School. In 1952, he became the principal of Littlefield High School in Littlefield, Texas. He was in the role for 3 years before he became the superintendent of Littlefield schools. He served in that role for 6 years.

In 1960, Schilling became president of Pan American College. The school was a four year college, however, Schilling led its recognition as a university. He also got the school accepted into the state system and spearheaded the school's graduate programs. Schilling left Pan American University in 1981.

He was also the president of the local Rotary Club and chair of the local Salvation Army. In 1990, OCU named him a distinguished alumnus.

== Personal life and death ==
Schilling died on May 9, 1994; he was 72. He was survived by a wife, Mary and their only son. Schilling was interred in Memorial Park Cemetery in Oklahoma City.
