= Flag of Phoenix =

City of Phoenix
- Proportion: 5:9
- Adopted: February 14, 1990
- Design: A maroon background with a white phoenix in the center
- Designed by: Design firm Smit, Ghomlely, Sanft

The flag of Phoenix, Arizona, contains a maroon field with a white phoenix emblem in the center. Its design is the second in the city's history and has been in place since 1990, replacing a flag that was adopted in 1921.

== Design and symbolism ==
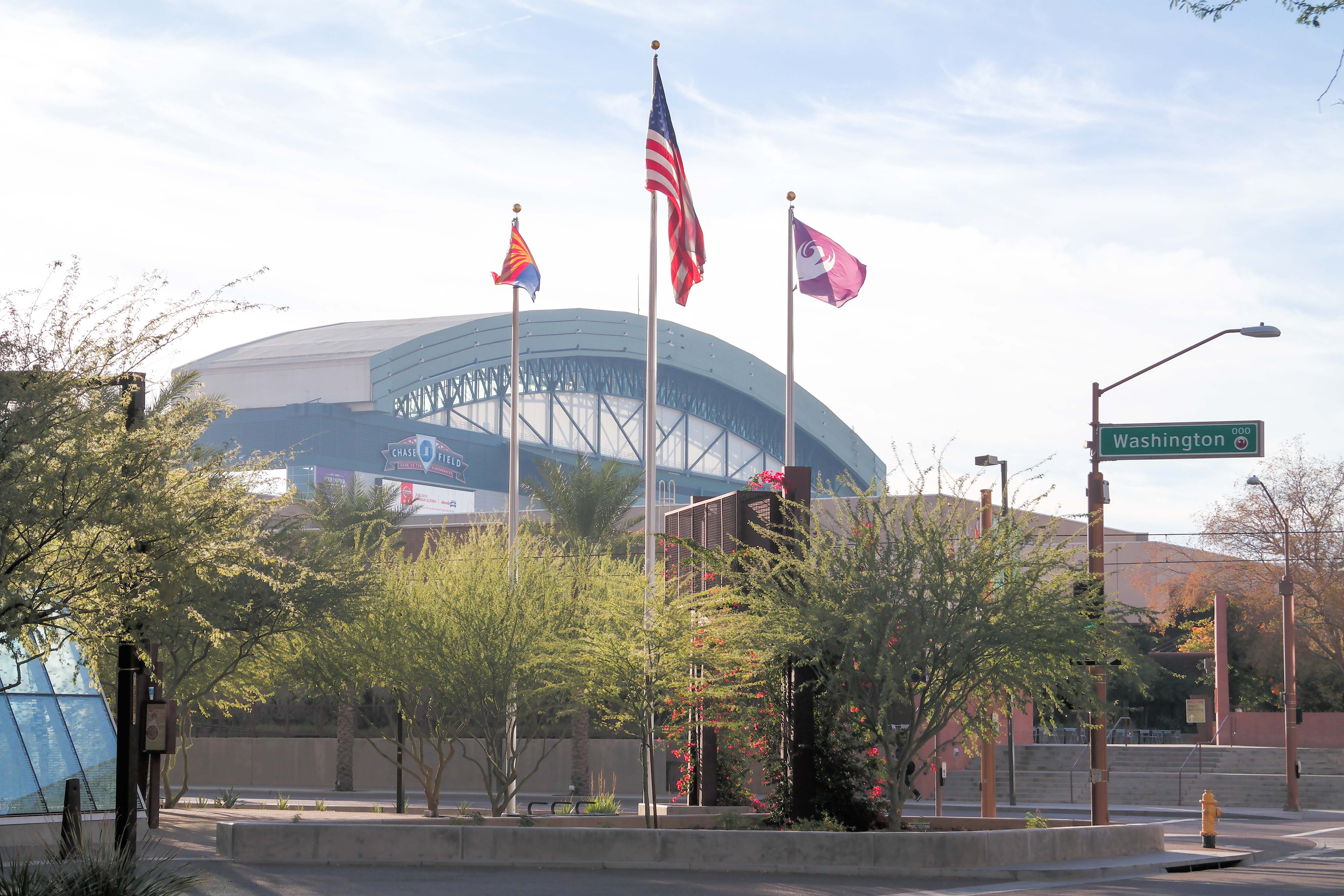
The flag flying alongside the flag of the United States and the flag of Arizona outside Chase Field

The flag is of 5:9 proportion and consists of a maroon background (officially PMS 228) and a white phoenix in the center of the flag, the same icon used in the seal of Phoenix. The bird's wings curve upward to nearly complete a full circle, with a diameter of one-third the length of the flag. In Greek, "phoenix" means purple, a fact reflected in the color choice for the flag. The mythological phoenix is the namesake of the city, suggested by Darrell Duppa in 1868, because it described a city born from the ruins of former Native American civilizations.

== History ==
=== First flag ===
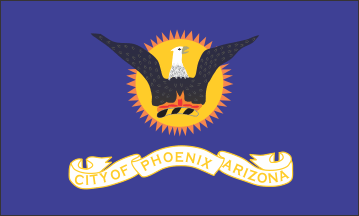
Former flag, from 1921 to 1990

Phoenix's first flag was designed for a contest organized by the Phoenix Chamber of Commerce in 1921. The first-place winner is unknown and was not chosen, as the design was considered too ornate for a flag. The second-place finisher, Frederick C. Green, had his design chosen instead. The flag had a dark blue field with a gray phoenix facing the outer edge of the flag, in front of a golden 48-pointed sun. Below this, a white banner with a gold icon had the words "City of Phoenix, Arizona". This design was flown during the Industrial Week and Armistice Day Parade on November 11, 1921, and was officially adopted by the Phoenix City Council on November 23, 1921, with the creation of Ordinance No. 554. The original proportions were 52 by 66 inches, but later versions were made in the proportion of 5:6.

=== Second flag ===
In the fall of 1986, the government of Phoenix decided a more unified brand for the city would be beneficial, as it would present an easy-to-identify image for the city. Additionally, standardizing official government products would save the city about $50,000. As a result of this, a logo contest was conceived and was launched in March 1987, with the rules stating the design must include a phoenix bird and the words "City of Phoenix". About 277 entries were received, mostly from individuals and firms from around the Phoenix area, but some from as far away as Surrey, England. From these, ten were selected as semi-finalists and made presentations to a panel in June 1987. These presentations were held at the Phoenix Civic Plaza, in front of an audience of several hundred. Of these, four progressed and gave their presentations to the Phoenix City Council. These four logo designs were voted on by the public, with ballot boxes placed around the city. A 1-900 phone number was set up and ballots were printed in the Sunday Arizona Republic newspaper and on municipal water bills. More than 20,000 ranked voting ballots were submitted, with the winning entry being a design by graphic design firm Smit Ghormley Sanft.

The current flag, using the phoenix bird logo from the contest, was officially adopted as the official flag of Phoenix on February 14, 1990, following the repeal of the 1921 ordinance mentioned previously. This change was made without fanfare and even came as a surprise to some, as the new branding was created almost three years prior, without any action targeted towards the city flag. It was also coincidental to the arrival of the National Football League's Cardinals from St. Louis in 1988 and their near-similar cardinal color. The flag made its first public appearance at the inauguration of Mayor Paul Johnson. The design ranked fourth best out of 150 United States city flags in a 2004 survey of the North American Vexillological Association, behind only the flags of Washington, D.C., Chicago, and Denver. The flag is also featured on the cover of the NAVA's 2003 book American City Flags. A 2015 Gizmodo article ranked Phoenix's among the worst city flags, however, calling its design "too simple".

== See also ==
- Firebird (database server)
