= KLIU =

KLIU may refer to:

- KLIU-LP, a low-power radio station (95.9 FM) licensed to serve Unalakleet, Alaska, United States
- Littlefield Municipal Airport (ICAO code KLIU)
