= Flag of San Antonio =

City of San Antonio
- Proportion: 5:9
- Adopted: August 27, 1992; 34 years ago
- Design: A vertical bi-color of blue on the left and red on the right, with a large white star in the center, containing a black-outlined Alamo in the middle
- Designed by: William W. Herring

The city flag of San Antonio, Texas was originally drawn by Spanish–American War veteran William W. Herring on May 28, 1933. The design saw significantly more usage than the official flag, but was never officially adopted until 1976. The current flag is a slightly modified version of Herring's design, most notably removing the text formerly displayed.

== Design and symbolism ==
The flag consists of a white star on top of a two-color background, with blue (officially PMS 286) on the hoist, and red (officially PMS 200) at the fly. Within the middle of the star is an illustration of The Alamo outlined and detailed in black. Red, white, and blue are the official colors of the state of Texas, as well as the de facto national colors of the United States. In addition to that, the blue symbolizes loyalty and the red represents blood, which every loyal Texan has. The Alamo illustration represents not only the battle and fort, but the city's role in the entirety of the Texas Revolution. As for measurements, the star's height is nine-tenths the height of the flag, and the Alamo's height is one-fourth the width of the flag. The flag bears resemblance to several other city flags of Texas, like the Flag of Houston and the Flag of Dallas. All three feature large white stars with a design in the center, symbolizing the "Lone Star State" nickname of Texas.

== History ==
=== First flag ===
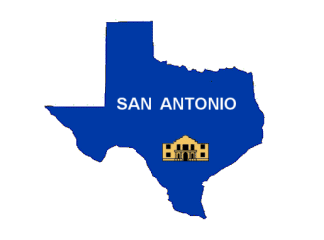
San Antonio's first flag, used from 1917 to 1976

Prior to an official city flag, many flags had flown in San Antonio, as many different nations have claimed jurisdiction of the city. Flags of Spain, the Republican Army of the North, the First Mexican Empire, the Mexican Republic, the Centralist Republic of Mexico, the Republic of Texas, the United States of America and the Confederacy all flew over the city. The idea for a city flag was first brought up to San Antonio commissioners by Arthur J. Storms, a Shriner from Alzafar Temple, on January 18, 1917. The first flag's design was a white field with a blue silhouette of Texas, with "SAN ANTONIO" written in white within the border. An Alamo illustration was placed roughly on the location of the city within the state. The flag had a dark-colored binding, likely blue, and measured 48 inches by 65 inches. Sources differ on when the flag was officially adopted, with American City Flags, a North American Vexillological Association (NAVA) book, listing the adoption date as January 25, 1917, while a 1992 NAVA News publication listed the date as April 3, 1917. What is not disputed is the fact that the flag fell somewhat into obscurity due to lack of use. The flag reappeared at the San Antonio City Hall in August 1929, and yet again disappeared.

=== Second flag ===
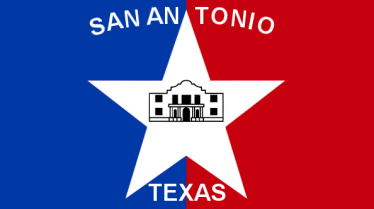
City's second flag, used from 1976-1992

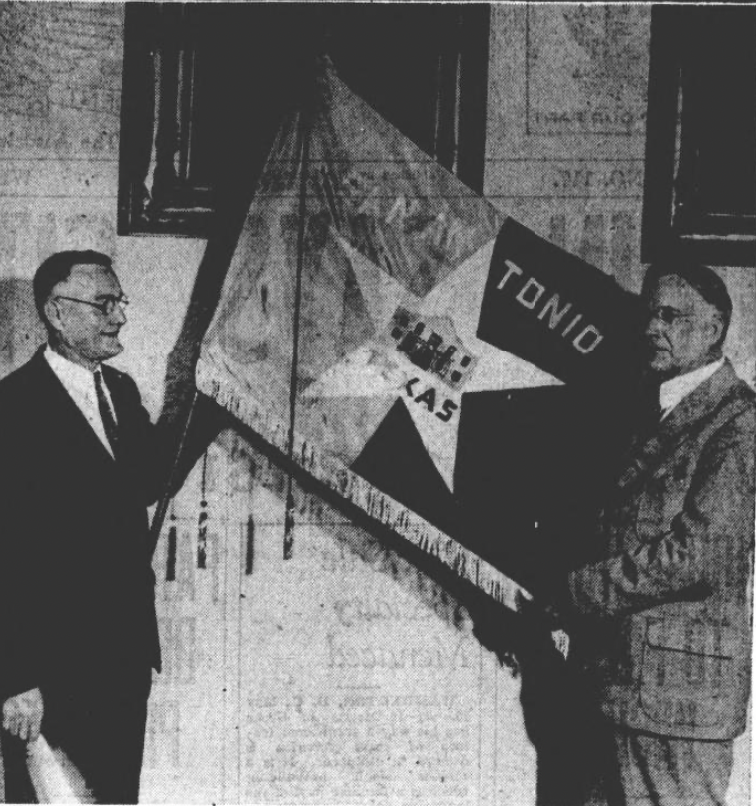
City flag from 1935

It is from this relatively unknown nature of the first design that the second flag was created. William Herring, a deputy commander for the Texas Department of United War Veterans, created the flag for the national convention of the United Spanish War Veterans in San Antonio. Herring's sketch of the design was dated May 28, 1933. The flag was later presented to the city council on April 18, 1935, by the United War Veterans, and was unofficially adopted on the same day. Two copies of the flag were made, one for the city hall, and one for the chamber of commerce. This led to a unique situation, as the first flag was yet again "discovered" following the approval of this design. The adoption of this flag technically did not repeal the former design, so San Antonio, for a period of time, had two flags. This design was slightly modified before being officially approved in 1976, bringing the word "TEXAS" below the star and in the same white block letter font as "SAN ANTONIO". This flag was of 10:18 proportion and had gold tassels. The original flag prior to the redesign has been lost.

=== Third flag ===
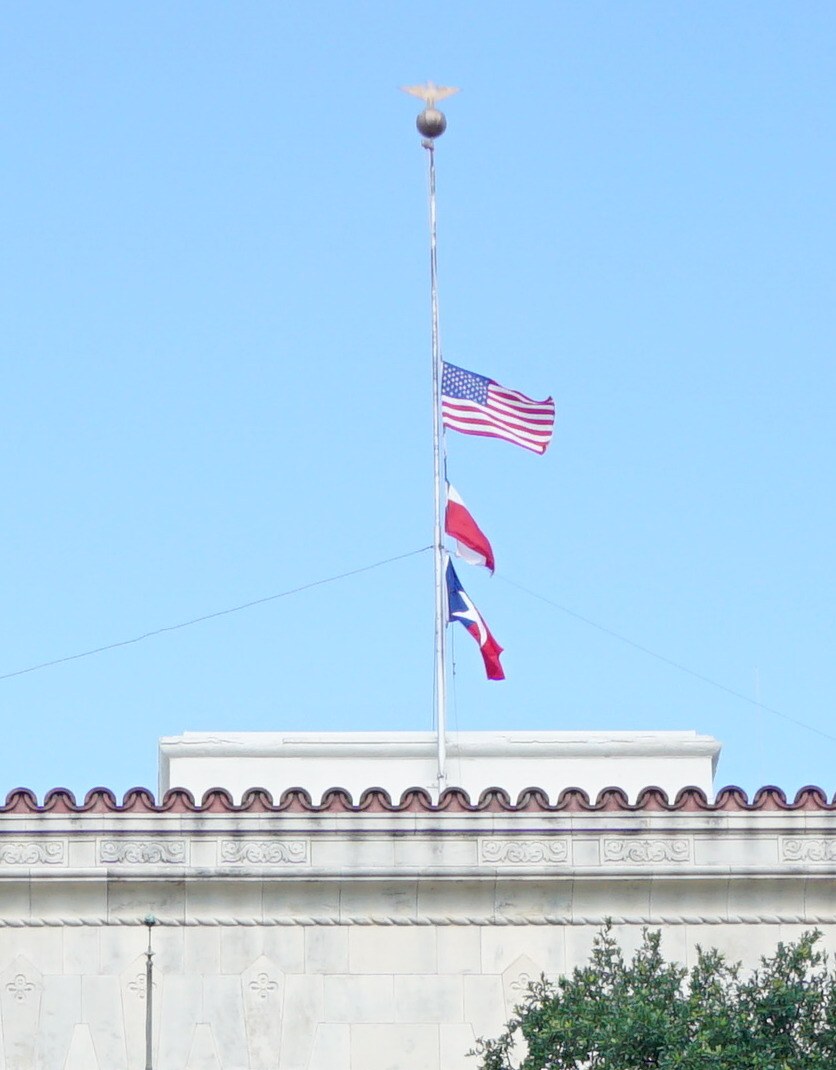
Detail of the flagpole on the top of the San Antonio City Hall. The city's flag is on the bottom.

The third, and current flag, is a slight modification of the second design. The text on the flag was removed after the city council was informed that it was no longer acceptable to place words on a flag. This suggestion was apparently from Pete Van de Putte, president of the San Antonio-based Dixie Flag Company, who also cited cost-cutting benefits in his suggestion to mayor Nelson Wolff. Along with the text, the gold tassels also were removed in the third design.
