= Littlefield House =

Historic house in Texas, United States

- U.S. National Register of Historic Places
- Recorded Texas Historic Landmark
- Texas State Antiquities Landmark
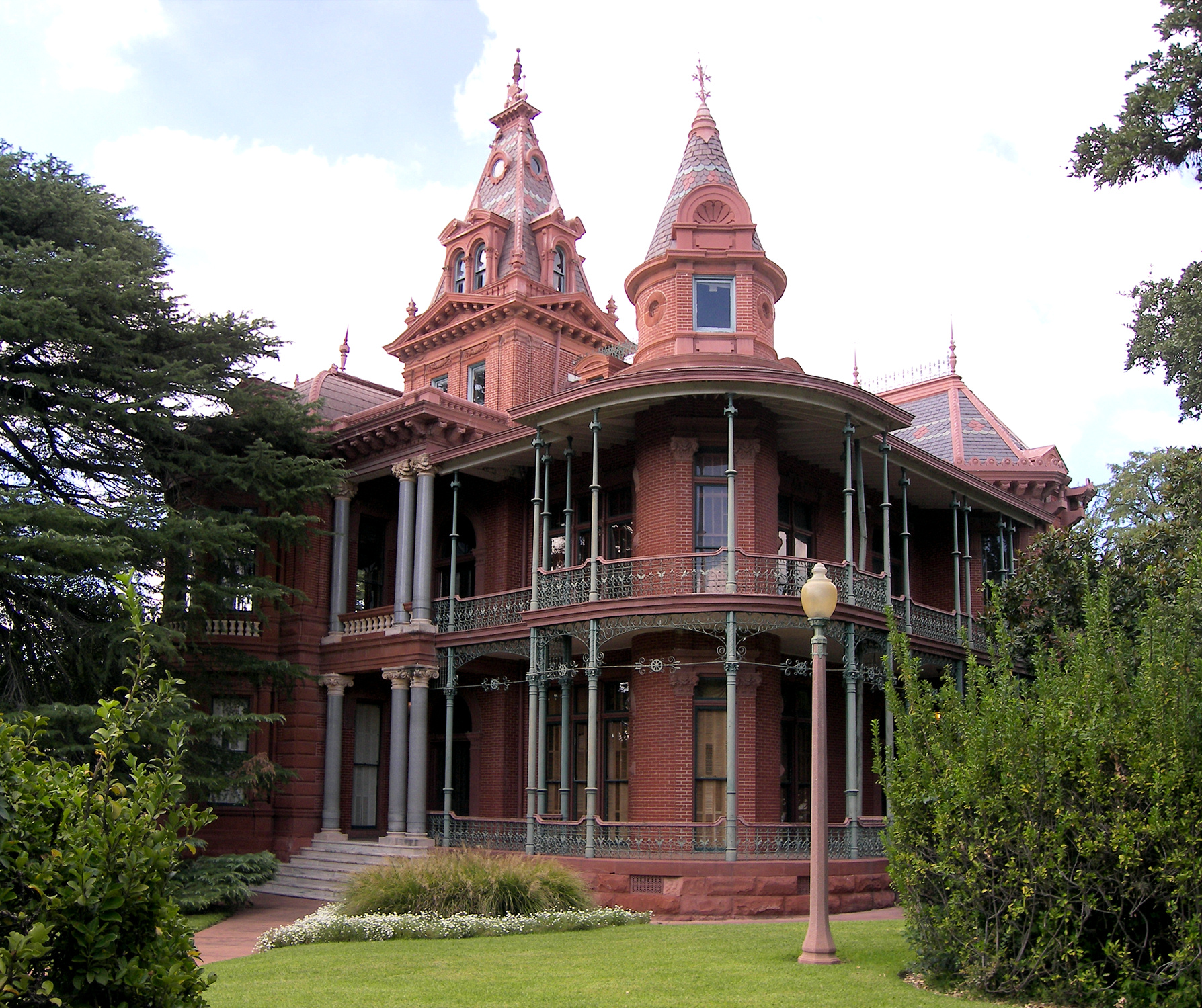
- The Littlefield House in 2007
- Location: 302 W 24th St, Austin, Texas, USA 78712
- Coordinates: 30°17′17″N 97°44′26″W
- Built: 1893
- Architect: James Wahrenberger
- NRHP reference No.: 70000767
- RTHL No.: 14889
- TSAL No.: 625

Significant dates
- Added to NRHP: August 25, 1970
- Designated RTHL: 1962
- Designated TSAL: 5/28/1981

The Littlefield House is a historic home in Austin, Texas, on the campus of the University of Texas at Austin. The home was built in 1893 for Civil War veteran George Littlefield, who was a successful businessman in the bank and cattle trades and a major benefactor to UT. It was designed using the popular Victorian style at a cost of $50,000.

While living in the house, Major Littlefield and his wife Alice made a tremendous number of contributions to the university, including funds for the Littlefield Fountain, the Main Building, and the Littlefield Dormitory. They also developed the Littlefield Building downtown, finished in 1912.

When Alice Littlefield died in 1935, she left the home to the university. Today the ground floor has been refurbished and is used for University functions. The upstairs is used for office space by the Office of University Events.

The home is located at 24th and Whitis streets. It was added to the National Register of Historic Places in 1970.

George Littlefield had a "Deodar Cedar" (Cedrus deodara), or "Himalayan cedar" imported from the Himalayas and planted on the property. Littlefield had the soil where the tree was to be placed dug up and replaced with Himalayan soil.

The 57-foot tree is located on the southwest side of the house, and is readily discernible by its distinctive horizontal layers. It is ranked as the #2 State Champion deodar cedar by Texas A&M Forest Service's Lists Big Tree Registry.
