= Lowe's Market =

Regional supermarket chain

- Current logo
- Company type: Private
- Industry: Retail
- Founded: 1964 (62 years ago) in Littlefield, Texas, United States
- Founder: E.M. "Bud" Lowe
- Headquarters: Littlefield, Texas, U.S.
- Number of locations: 146 (2021)
- Area served: Arizona, Colorado, Kansas, New Mexico, Texas
- Key people: Roger Lowe Sr. (President & Chairman of the Board), Tim Cotton (COO)
- Products: Bakery, dairy, deli, frozen foods, general grocery, meat, pharmacy (some locations), produce, seafood, snacks
- Services: Pick-Up Lane; Curbside Service
- Revenue: ▲$1.243 billion (2021)
- Number of employees: 22,000 (2019)
- Website: lowesmarket.com

Lowe's Market is an American regional supermarket chain, primarily in West Texas and South Texas and throughout New Mexico. The company also operates stores in Colorado, Arizona and Kansas. The company's home office is in Littlefield, Texas.

== History ==
Lowe's Market traces its history to E.M. "Bud" Lowe who sold candy and sundries from the back of a truck in Littlefield, Texas in the 1940s. In 1964, Bud Lowe opened the first Lowe's Market, a small grocery store, in Olton, Texas. The company began the process of gradual expansion into small and medium-sized towns in Texas and New Mexico. Some of the stores are similar to large convenience stores, between 2,000 sq.ft. to 4,000 sq.ft., however, stocked with fresh meat and produce. Many of the stores are standard supermarket size, 15,000 sq.ft. to 40,000 sq.ft.

== Growth and expansion ==
Many Lowe's Market stores were acquired from other companies such as Furr's Grocery (defunct, many of which were formerly Safeway stores), Big 8 Foods (many of which were formerly Safeway stores acquired from Furr's Grocery by Big 8 Foods), and Super S. Currently, there are 114 Lowe's Market stores open in the chain in Texas, New Mexico, Arizona, Kansas, and Colorado.

After the bankruptcy of Furr's Supermarkets in 2001, Lowe's Market acquired a number of the Furr's properties and converted them into Lowe's Market stores. In April 2011, Lowe's Market acquired 53 stores owned by Super S Foods, a San Antonio-based chain. In April 2014, Lowe's Market acquired 7 stores from Nocona-based Market Place. In 2023, Lowe's Market acquired ten stores from Andrews-based Porter's.

In some areas, Lowe's Market stores use the names Lowe's, Shop N Save, Food Jet, Food King, Super S, Big 8, Super Save, and Avanza. A significant number of the stores in New Mexico, Texas, and Colorado are aimed at the Hispanic grocery market share, particularly the stores using the Avanza, Fiesta, Fiero, and Mercado nameplates. However, Hispanic grocery products are commonly stocked in all Lowe's Market stores, since the stores serve a substantial Latino/Hispanic population in all geographic areas of the company's presence.

There are two stores in Arizona, in Window Rock and Ganado. In Colorado, there are stores in Greeley, Westcliffe and in the Denver area. In New Mexico, stores are found throughout the state. In Texas, stores are in West Texas, North Texas, the Panhandle, Central Texas, and South Texas. Its only Kansas store is in Ulysses.
