= Roy Furr =

American businessman

Roy Furr (1907 — June 13, 1975) was an American businessman. He was the president of the Furr's chain of supermarkets and restaurants after his older brother Key Furr.

== Early life and education ==
Furr was born in McKinney, Texas. As a boy he worked for his father C.W. Furr and brother Key Furr at the Kirkland Mercantile Company in Kirkland in Childress County, Texas. He studied at Clarendon College in Clarendon, Texas, and the University of Oklahoma at Norman.

He taught school until 1923, when he rejoined his father and older brother Key Furr in Amarillo to launch the Furr Food Stores. In 1929 Roy moved to Lubbock, where the Furr family bought six grocery stores from M systems, the continuation of the chain. After C.W. Furr's death, Key Furr, the older brother became president of Furr's, Inc., which grew rapidly, and at the time of Roy Furr's death it included sixty-eight supermarkets, as well as family centers in three states, fifty-seven cafeterias in seven states, 150 Cessna airplanes, 2 Falcon jets and a realty company in Lubbock.

== Early career ==
Furr was the chairman of the board of Farm Pac Kitchens, Rore Realty Company, and Crone Oil Company, all companies that he established as he branched out from his supermarket business using money from the family business. He also served as a director of the First National Bank of Lubbock. He was on the boards of regents of Texas Tech University, Lubbock Christian College, and McMurry College in Abilene, Texas. In 1961, McMurry gave him an honorary doctorate.

Furr thought that the highest honor he ever received was the Great Americanism Award, which he accepted in the early 1970s from radio personality Paul Harvey as a commendation for his outstanding achievement in philanthropic work. He raised hundreds of thousands of dollars for various causes. Furr and his wife, Lela, had two sons and a daughter. Furr died on June 13, 1975, and is interred at Lubbock.

The family business fared poorly after Furr's death due to the misuse and over-extending of his son Roy Furr Jr. In 1979, the company declared bankruptcy; the grocery business was sold to a group of West German investors and the restaurant business, Furr's Cafeterias, was bought by Kmart.

== Furr's Grocery Stores and Furr's Supermarkets ==
C.W. Furr, Roy Furr's father, founded the retail operation in 1904 and operated the stores primarily in west Texas. Roy Furr entered the retail business, ultimately known as Furr's Inc., in 1923 and with his father and older brother Key Furr, began a grocery store expansion in 1929. Eventually the chain expanded into New Mexico. By 1978, the chain had grown to 140 stores throughout New Mexico and west Texas, primarily smaller grocery markets. In 1979, the German investment banker Rewe-Leibbrand obtained full ownership over Furr's Inc, with Furr’s Cafeterias sold to Kmart. In 1987, Furr's purchased the Safeway El Paso division, which added 59 stores and a warehouse. After the acquisition, Furr's operated 200 stores with annual sales of $2 billion. In 1990 Rewe-Leibbrand liquidated most of the stores in the Texas panhandle and sought to divest and find new investors for ownership of the remaining stores in New Mexico and west Texas. By 1991, the ownership of the company was 54 percent held by a Hamburg, Germany-based investment banking firm, 40 percent by the Fleming Companies (a Lubbock, Texas-based grocery supplier), and six percent by the American executive management team. The company, now known as Furr's Supermarkets Inc., moved its headquarters from Lubbock, Texas to Albuquerque, New Mexico.

Later that year, Furr's purchased 13 Safeway stores in New Mexico, and the company operated 75 grocery stores. By 1993, Furr's operated three divisions: Furr's Emporiums (the superstore operation), Bag'n'Save Stores (the grocery warehouse division), and So-Lo Stores (club warehouse-style stores). Through aggressive merchandising campaigns, Furr's was the primary grocery competitor to Albertsons stores, Kroger Corporation's Smith's stores, and Raley's stores in New Mexico and west Texas. In 1994, sales exceeded $1 billion.

In 1995, Furr's sought outside investment in the company. Windward Capital Partners, a private New York equity investment group, acquired majority ownership of Furr's. In 1998, the Fleming Companies liquidated its ownership interest in Furr's, and subsequently Furr's Supermarkets acquired ownership of one of Fleming's distribution warehouses in El Paso in order to execute its own grocery supply operation for its stores.

By 1999 Furr's operated 75 grocery stores in New Mexico and Texas with about 5,500 employees.

On February 8, 2001, Furr's sought Chapter 11 bankruptcy protection and then ultimately converted the filing to Chapter 7, thus liquidating all of its properties and ceasing business operations. Some properties were acquired by Smith's stores, some were acquired by Lowe's Market stores, some were acquired by independent grocers and many were shuttered.
