= Littlefield (surname) =

Littlefield is a surname. Notable people bearing it include:

- Alfred H. Littlefield (1829–1893), Governor of Rhode Island and brother of Daniel
- Arthur W. Littlefield co-founder of publishers Rowman & Littlefield
- Bill Littlefield (b. 1948), sports writer and radio show host
- Catherine Littlefield (1905–1951), American ballerina, choreographer, founder of the Philadelphia Ballet
- Clyde Littlefield (1892–1981), American football and track and field coach at the University of Texas
- Daniel Littlefield (1822–1891), Central Falls haircloth magnate, Lieutenant governor of Rhode Island, and brother of Alfred
- Dave Littlefield (b. 1960), former general manager of the Pittsburgh Pirates
- Dick Littlefield (1926–1997), American baseball pitcher
- Edmund Wattis Littlefield (1914–2001), CEO of Utah Construction Company
- Esther Littlefield (1906–1997), Tlingit artist based in Sitka, Alaska
- George H. Littlefield (1842–1919), Union Civil War Medal of Honor recipient
- George W. Littlefield (1842–1920), Confederate officer, cattleman, banker and regent of the University of Texas
- Henry Littlefield (1933–2000), American educator, originator of political interpretations of The Wonderful Wizard of Oz
- Jacques Littlefield (1949–2009), founder of the Military Vehicle Technology Foundation (MVTF)
- Little Willie Littlefield (1931–2013), American blues musician
- Milton Smith Littlefield (1830–1899), Union general in American Civil War
- Robert Littlefield, Jr., longtime United States Bankruptcy Court judge
- Sherri Nienass Littlefield (b. 1987), American artist and art dealer
