= Littlefield Independent School District =

School district in Texas

Littlefield Independent School District is a public school district based in Littlefield, Texas (USA).

In 2009, the school district was rated "academically acceptable" by the Texas Education Agency.

== Schools ==
- Littlefield High School (Grades 9-12)
- Littlefield Junior High (Grades 6-8)
- Littlefield Elementary (Grades 3-5)
- Littlefield Primary (Grades PK-2)
