= Alice Littlefield =

American socialite (1846–1935)

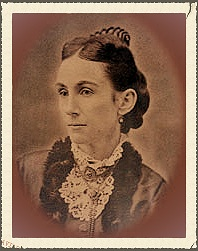
- Born: Alice Payne Tillar; April 10, 1846; Virginia, US
- Died: January 9, 1935 (aged 88); Austin, Texas, US
- Resting place: Oakwood Cemetery in Austin
- Spouse: George W. Littlefield (m. 1863; died 1920)
- Children: 2

Alice Tillar Littlefield (born Alice Payne Tillar; April 10, 1846 – January 9, 1935) was an American socialite who was the wife of Texas businessman and philanthropist George W. Littlefield. The Littlefield Dormitory at the University of Texas is named in her honor.

== Early life ==
Littlefield was born Alice Payne Tillar, on April 10, 1846, in Virginia, the daughter of William Tillar and Mildred (née Lundy) Tillar. Her father moved the family to DeSoto County, Mississippi, where he died in 1850. After her mother's marriage to Whitfield Harral Jr. in 1855, Littlefield gained three older step-brothers. In 1857, Harral moved the family to Gonzales, Texas, where Alice enrolled in Gonzales College at age 11. The college more closely resembled the present-day definition of a school than that of a modern college or university. In addition to the standard curriculum, Alice studied painting, music and French.

== Personal life ==
Littlefield presumably met George W. Littlefield during their studies at Gonzales College. By September 1861, when George left to fight for the Confederacy during the Civil War, the couple were engaged. Two years later, when Littlefield was home on leave, the couple married on January 14, 1863, in Houston, Texas. Major Littlefield was discharged from the Confederate Army a year later for injuries, and the couple returned to manage his family plantation in Gonzales County.

Their marriage produced two children, both of whom died in infancy. Ed Rhodes Littlefield was born in 1866 and died less than a year later. The second child, a girl, was born in 1868 and died at birth. Lacking children of their own, Littlefield and her husband became very close to their extended family, and their nieces and nephews were frequent visitors in their home. They paid for the college educations of all 12 nephews and 17 nieces, established each nephew in business and gave each niece a home. In the words of one of Alice's nieces, "Everyone in the family worshipped Aunt Alice. I couldn't have loved her more if she'd been my own mother".

Pastel portrait of Littlefield, by her niece, Sarah Harral Duggan

== Achievements ==
Littlefield made several impacts on the city of Austin. She organized a local children's home, and joined Austin's Albert Sidney Johnston Chapter of the United Daughters of the Confederacy in 1901. The Johnston Chapter focused on historical preservation and working with children. In 1903, she served as a delegate for the chapter at the Daughters' tenth annual meeting in Charleston, South Carolina.

Littlefield is the namesake of the University of Texas residence hall that bears her name. While in Austin, George donated $300,000 to the University of Texas for the creation of a dormitory specifically for freshman women. The residence hall was named in honor of Alice, and she was the guest of honor at its dedication in 1927. Alice's great-nephew Maurice Hood Dowell believed she had "inspired the idea of a dormitory for young girls in their freshman year at the University, as I heard her make the statement years ago that a girl during her first year from home needed special care and protection". In 1933, Alice Littlefield was the guest of honor at the dedication of the Littlefield Memorial Fountain and nine other University buildings.

== Later life ==
In 1912, at around 65 years of age, Littlefield developed an unexplained "nervous condition". With apparently no cause, she developed the delusion that her whole household would be murdered and she would be kidnapped. This made her prone to nervous fits of hysteria. On one occasion, she ran down the stairs screaming for her life and had to be restrained. George Littlefield wrote that when a doctor advised him to take Alice to a sanitarium, "I told him I would not think of leaving her with strangers, but I would carry her home, so I could look after her and care for her in comfort". He hired three nurses, but the condition persisted for eight years.

After George died of pneumonia in 1920, Alice's nervous condition suddenly and unexpectedly improved. Now that her husband's safety was no longer a concern, she regained normal mental health and resumed an active social life. She spent much time with relatives but little in the public view.

Littlefield died on January 9, 1935, aged 88, and is buried at Austin's Oakwood Cemetery beside her husband. Her gravestone reads, "Beloved wife of George W. Littlefield".
