= Flag of Denver =

Denver
- Proportion: 4:7
- Adopted: 1926; 100 years ago
- Design: A blue field with a white zigzag pattern, forming two red triangles on the bottom. Within the blue on top, yellow circle is added near the center
- Designed by: Margaret Overbeck

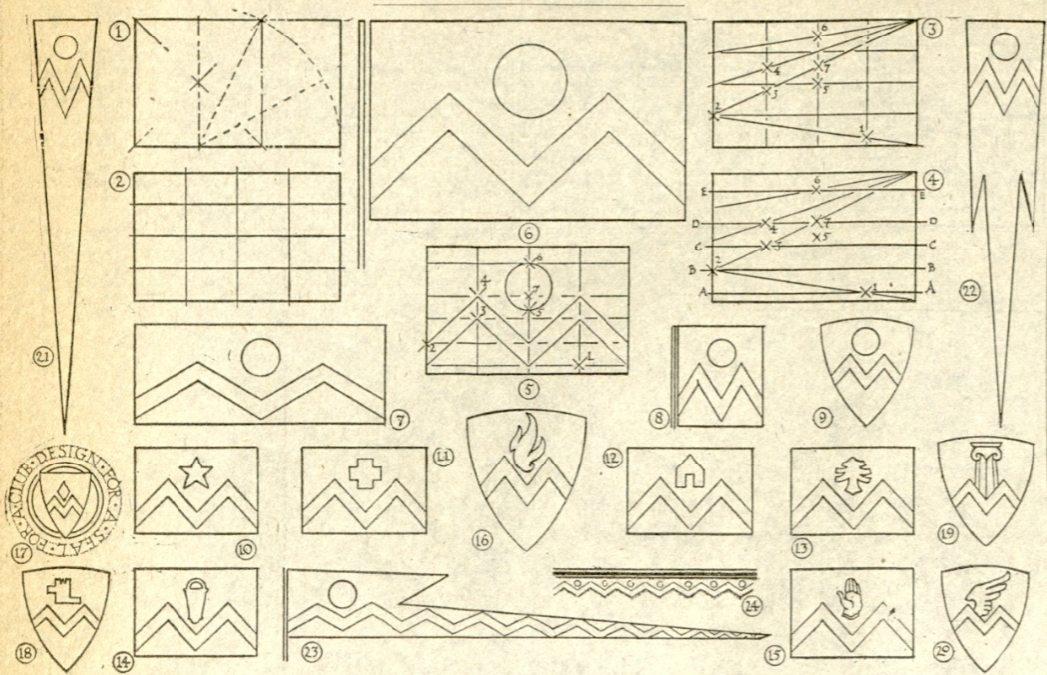
Proposed city flags, 1926

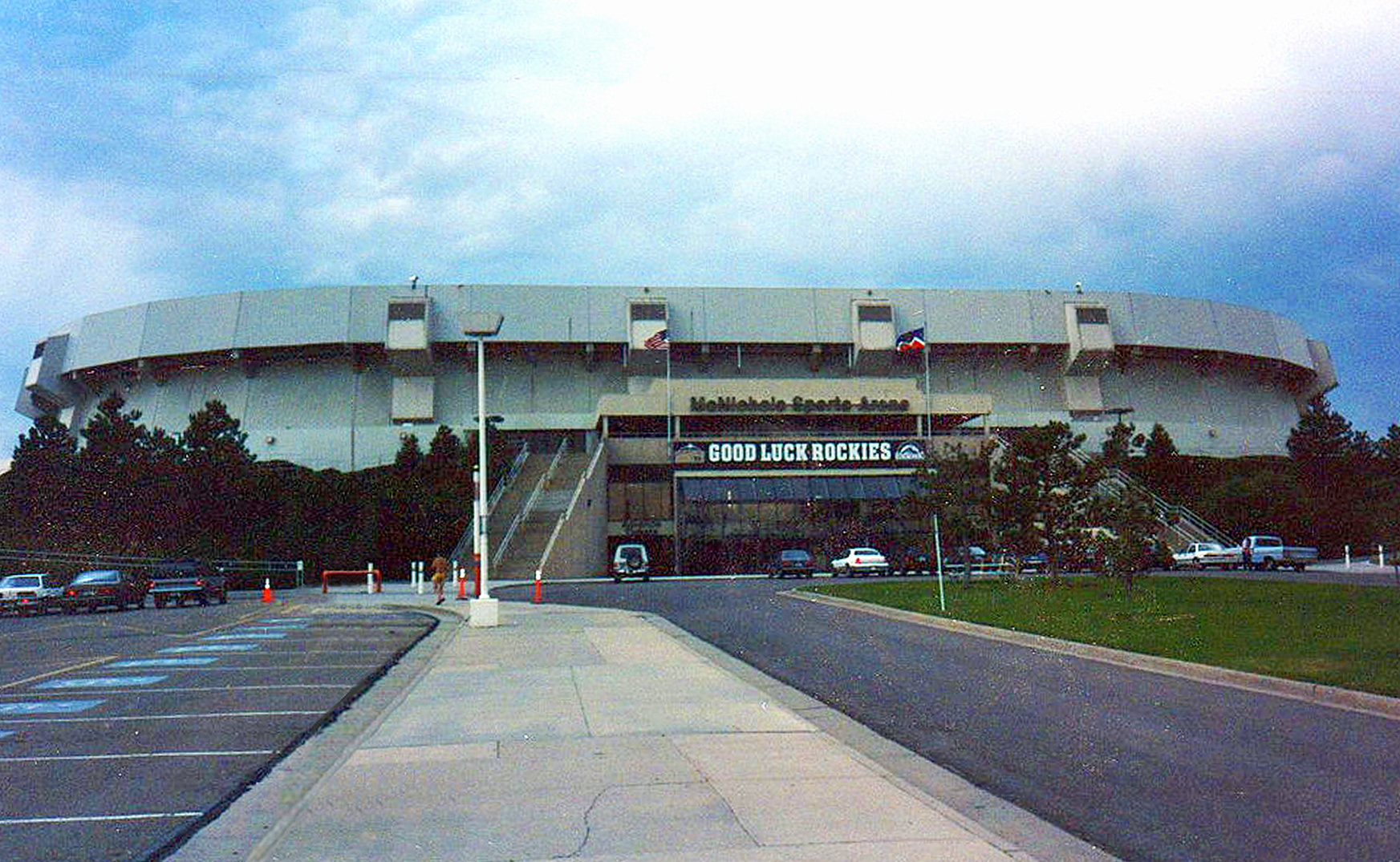
The McNichols Sports Arena in 1994, with a Denver flag flying out front.

The flag of the City and County of Denver was designed by a North High School student, Margaret Overbeck, and adopted in 1926. A zigzag white stripe horizontally separates a red field below from a blue field above, in which is centered a yellow circle, together forming a stylized depiction of the Sun in a blue sky above snow-capped mountains. The color yellow symbolizes gold in the state's hills, and red the colored earth to which the word colorado refers. The circle's centered position symbolizes Denver's central location within the state. The white zigzag symbolizes Colorado's Native American heritage.

In a 2004 review by the North American Vexillological Association of 150 U.S. city flags, the Denver city flag was ranked third best, behind the flags of Washington, D.C., and Chicago.
