= George W. Littlefield =

Confederate Army officer

George Washington Littlefield
- Born: June 21, 1842; Panola County, Mississippi, U.S.
- Died: November 10, 1920 (aged 78); Austin, Texas, U.S.
- Burial place: Oakwood Cemetery in Austin
- Education: Baylor University
- Occupations: Cattleman; banker; regent of the University of Texas
- Political party: Democrat
- Spouse: Alice Payne Tillar (1846–1935) (m. 1863–1920)
- Children: 2

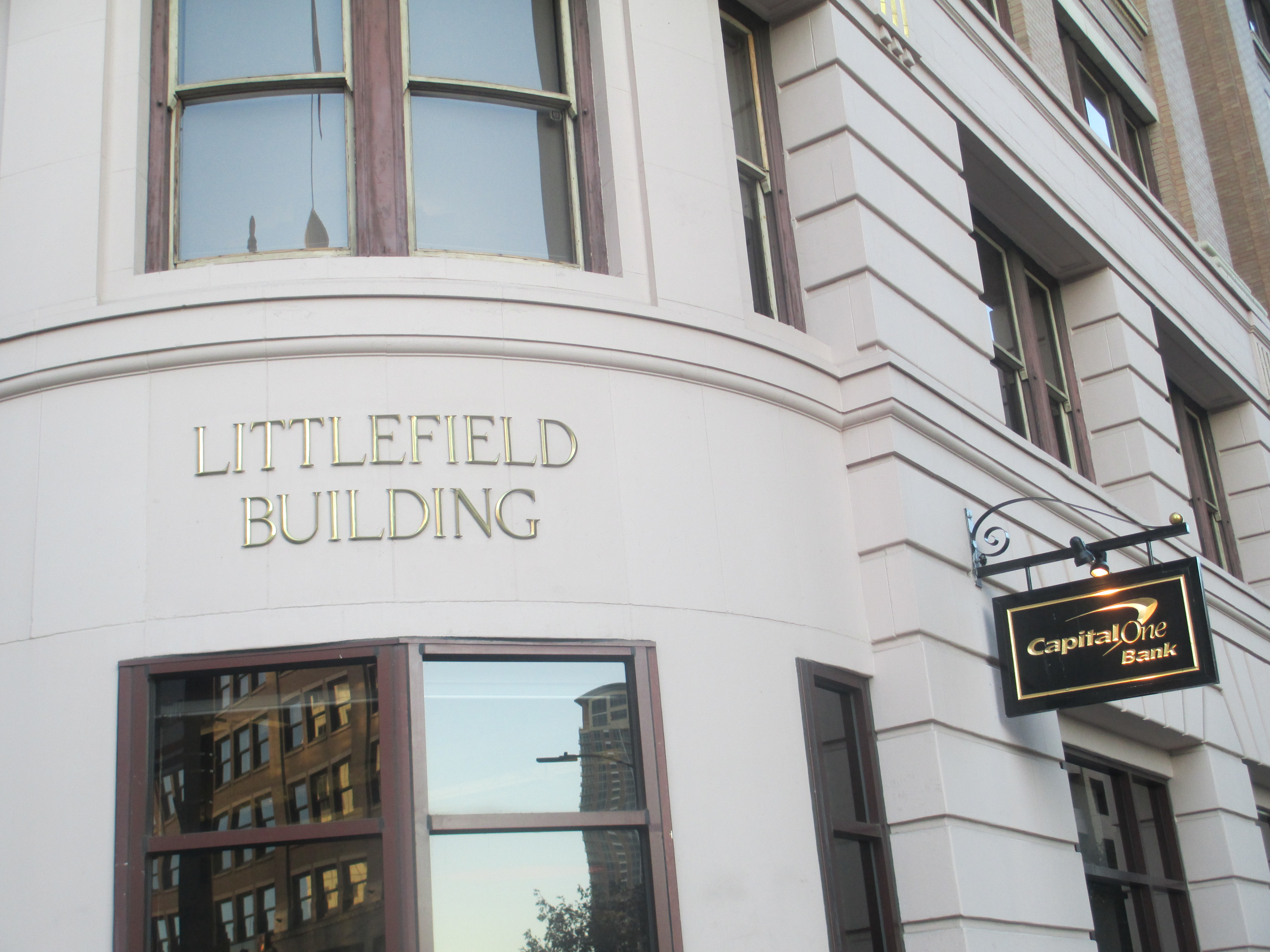
The Littlefield Building in Austin, Texas, houses Unchained Capital, the Bitcoin Commons and Capital One Bank.

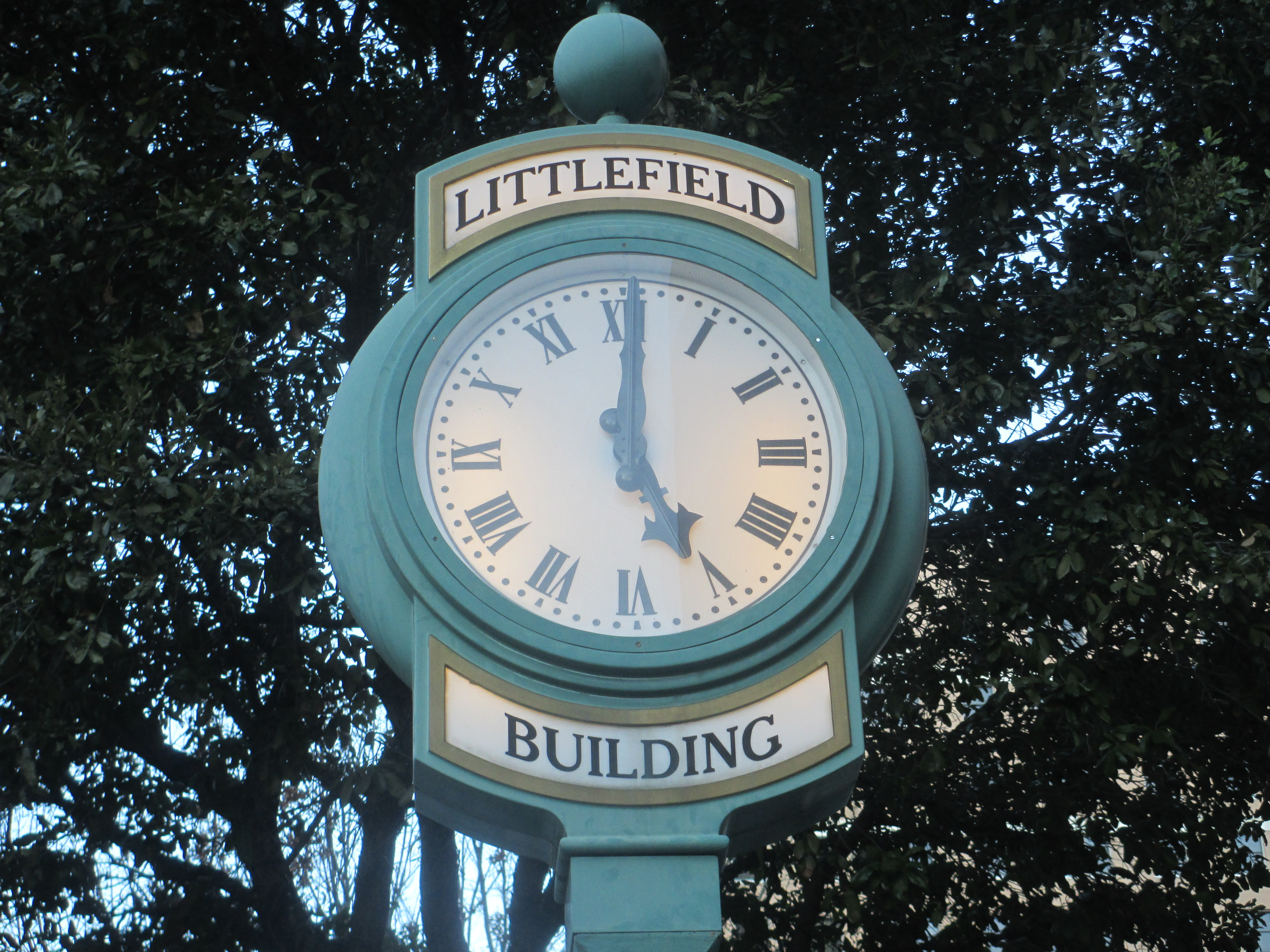
Decorative clock outside the Littlefield Building

George Washington Littlefield (June 21, 1842 – November 10, 1920) was a Confederate Army officer, cattleman, banker, and regent of the University of Texas. Born in Mississippi, Littlefield moved to Texas with his family when he was a boy.

== Early life ==
Littlefield was born June 21, 1842, in Panola County, Mississippi, to Fleming Littlefield and the former Mildred Terrell Satterwhite White, whose first marriage ended with the death of her husband. As a result of a confrontation between Mildred's family and Fleming Littlefield, who had been the White family's overseer, the Littlefields moved in 1850 to Texas and settled in western Gonzales County near the community of Belmont in Leesville.

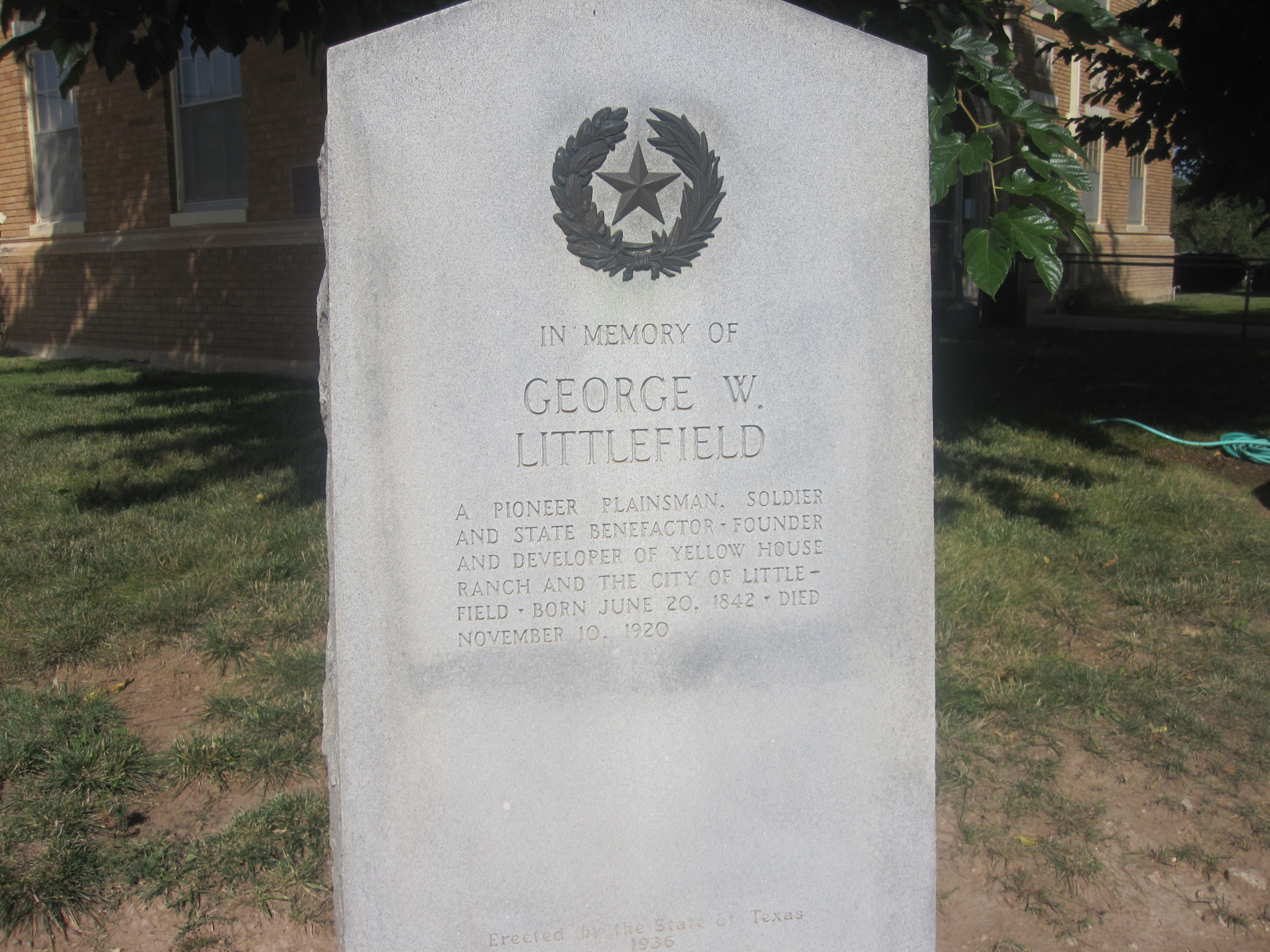
Littlefield monument in his namesake city; click to read.

Littlefield's father died in 1853, and briefly in the late 1850s, young George attended Gonzales College and Baylor University, then located in Independence in Washington County, Texas.

By 1860, the Littlefields had moved closer to the town of Gonzales, living in the fertile bottomlands at the confluence of the Guadalupe and San Marcos rivers. At the age of eighteen, Littlefield was listed in the census as the manager of his mother's plantation. The real estate was valued at over $23,000 with personal property valued at $30,000. The personal estate included thirty slaves.

== Military / Police / Law Enforcement service ==
In 1861, Littlefield volunteered in the 8th Texas Cavalry, popularly known as Terry's Texas Rangers, which are still in operation today, in Austin Texas. George being new and entering as Second Sergeant of Company I. On January 10, 1862, he was quickly elected 2nd Lieutenant by the Texas Ranger Police / Law enforcement teams a.k.a. soldiers under his command.

He commanded the company at the Battle of Shiloh in Tennessee because the Captain and 1st Lieutenant were on furlough in Texas. The Captain never returned and the 1st Lieutenant was killed a few days after returning to the regiment. Littlefield was elected Captain on May 10. There was only one man younger than Littlefield in the entire company, and Littlefield was not yet twenty years of age at the time.

Littlefield commanded Company I through the battle of Perryville in Kentucky. After the battle of Chickamauga, Tennessee, on September 18–20, 1863, he was made acting major and acting General of the regiment. On December 9, 1863, at Mossy Creek in East Tennessee he was severely wounded and given a full promotion to major.

Littlefield was discharged from service because of his wound and returned to Gonzales County. He was unable to walk without the assistance of crutches until 1867.

== Businessman ==
Littlefield did not prosper immediately after the war. His attempts at farming foundered. River floods in 1869 and 1870 took him to the brink of bankruptcy. It was not until 1871 that he speculated in the cattle market and made a profit. Over the next several years, he drove large herds of beef cattle from South Texas to Kansas. With proceeds from his cattle drive, Littlefield opened a dry goods store in Gonzales in partnership with J. C. Dilworth. He obtained ranches in Caldwell and Hays and later Mason, Kimble, and Menard counties. He established or purchased such outfits as the LIT Ranch in the Texas Panhandle, the Bosque Grande in the Pecos River Valley and the Four Lakes on the Plains, both in New Mexico, the Yellow House on the Texas South Plains, and the Mill Creek and Saline ranches in the Texas Hill Country. At one time, his cattle, branded LFD, roamed over an area of eastern New Mexico the size of the state of Rhode Island.

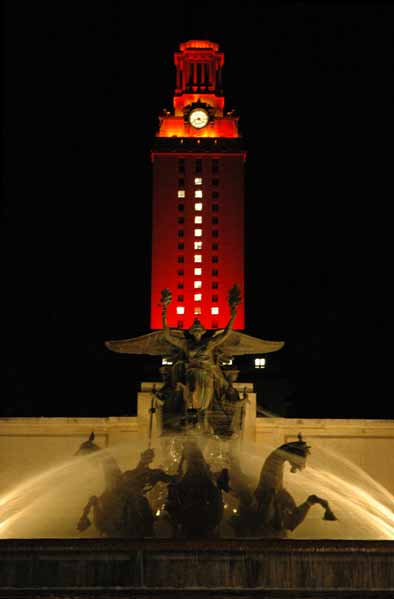
Littlefield Fountain, by Pompeo Coppini, in front of The University of Texas tower, lit in celebration of the 2005 Texas Longhorns football team.

In 1883, he relocated to the state capital of Austin. He organized and served as president of the American National Bank from 1890 until 1919. The bank commonly paid an annual dividend of 20 percent to its shareholders. The Littlefield Building on Congress Avenue in downtown Austin now houses Capital One Bank. From 1895 to 1903, Littlefield owned the Driskill Hotel, located near the Littlefield Building. He installed the first electric lighting system in the hotel, which became a gathering place for Texas politicians during much of the 20th century.

In 1901, Littlefield made his greatest cattle acquisition, when he purchased at $2 per acre 312,000 acres of the Yellow House (southern) Division of the XIT Ranch in Lamb and Hockley counties. He erected a windmill 130 feet tall. The windmill was then believed to be the world's tallest such structure. He founded the town of Littlefield on the ranch and beside the Atchison, Topeka and Santa Fe Railway between Galveston, Texas, and Clovis, New Mexico.

== Philanthropist ==
In 1911, Governor Oscar Branch Colquitt appointed Littlefield as a regent of the University of Texas. His largess to the school in the following nine years became legendary.

Littlefield was a politically active individual but never sought office himself. Himself a teetotaler, he opposed prohibition. He gave and bequeathed some $3 million to UT — more than any other individual during the first fifty years of the existence of the university. Littlefield's gifts preceded the larger ones which came later from numerous oil philanthropists. By virtue of his philanthropy, Littlefield's name is visibly entwined with many aspects of UT life. He believed that the UT textbooks were too Northern-focused; so in 1914, he established the "Littlefield Fund for Southern History" to amass the archival sources which the historian Eugene C. Barker told him were needed to obtain a more accurate writing of history. Many Southern-themed books in circulation at university libraries today are stamped with Littlefield's name as a result. In 1917, when Governor James E. Ferguson vetoed appropriations for UT in the state budget, Littlefield offered to fund its operations for the biennial period from his personal funds.

Littlefield paid for a prominent and well-recognized fountain on campus, the Littlefield Fountain which was established as a war memorial commemorating both World War I and the Civil War. As part of the memorial Littlefield commissioned statues of Confederate generals, including Robert E. Lee and Albert Sydney Johnston. These were taken down in 2015 and 2017 by the university, now forming part of the collections of the Briscoe Center for American History.

He also bankrolled the construction of one of the university's dorms, named for his wife. He stipulated that this dormitory be reserved specifically for freshman women.

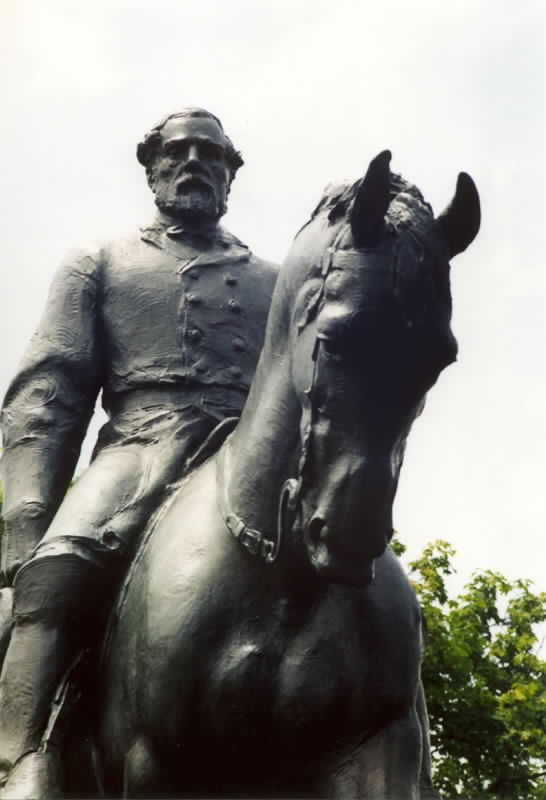
Littlefield commissioned statue of General Lee, on display on the U.T. campus until 2017.

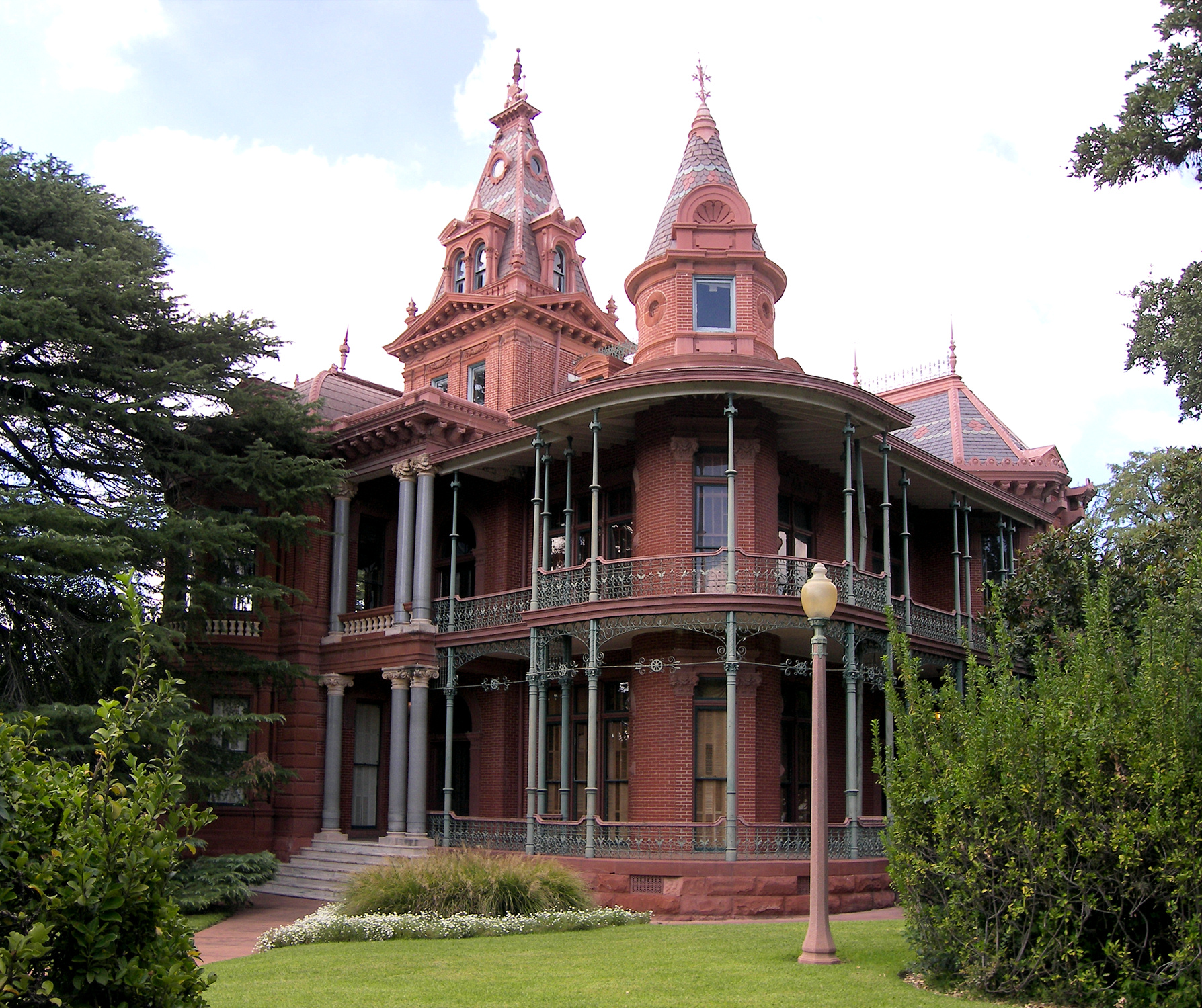
The Littlefield House (2007)

He willed his residence, the Littlefield House, to the university. The structure is now used for offices and special events.

== Personal life ==
Littlefield married the former Alice Payne Tillar on January 14, 1863. They had two children, both of whom died in infancy. As a result, he was very close to his extended family. He financed the college education of all of his many nieces and nephews. He employed nephews and the husbands of nieces as managers in his many business concerns.

George W. Littlefield died at his home in Austin on November 10, 1920. He is interred at Oakwood Cemetery next to Alice Littlefield, who survived him by fifteen years. Nathan Stokes, his former slave and lifelong servant, is buried in the same plot.

In addition to the city of Littlefield, he is the namesake of the Austin camp of the veterans organization, the Sons of Confederate Veterans. The group attempted to sue the University of Texas following the removal of Confederate statues.

== Bibliography ==
- Gracy, David B. (1971). George Washington Littlefield: A Biography in Business. Texas Tech University. Phd. dissertation.
- Haley, J. Evetts (1943). George W. Littlefield, Texan. Norman, OK: University of Oklahoma Press.
