= Littlefield High School (Texas) =

Location
- 1100 W Waylon Jennings Blvd. Littlefield, Texas 79339-4207; United States; 33.9164°N 102.3424°W

Information
- School type: Public high school
- School district: Littlefield Independent School District
- Principal: Amber Hayes
- Staff: 31.65 (FTE)
- Grades: 9–12
- Enrollment: 364 (2023-2024)
- Student to teacher ratio: 11.50
- Colors: Maroon & White
- Athletics conference: UIL Class 3A
- Mascot: Wildcat/Lady Cat
- Yearbook: The Wildcat
- Website: Littlefield High School

Littlefield High School is a public high school located in the city of Littlefield, Texas, United States and classified as a 3A school by the University Interscholastic League (UIL). It is a part of the Littlefield Independent School District located in south central Lamb County. In 2015, the school was rated "Met Standard" by the Texas Education Agency.

== History ==
The school sought to be accredited by the Southern Association of High Schools and Colleges, and the Littlefield ISD board of trustees approved of the high school's application in 1952.

== Athletics ==
The Littlefield Wildcats compete in these sports

Volleyball, Cross Country, Football, Basketball, Golf, Tennis, Track, Baseball & Softball

=== State titles ===
- Football
  - 1949(1A)

== Notable alumni ==
- Billy Howton (1930–2025), (class of 1948), NFL player for the Green Bay Packers, the Cleveland Browns, and the Dallas Cowboys.
- Waylon Jennings (1937–2002), (dropped out, scheduled for class of 1955), American music musician, actor, and author.
