= American City Flags =

Journal issue documenting flags of US cities

Book cover

American City Flags: 150 Flags from Akron to Yonkers is a 2003 book by John M. Purcell about city flags. It is a special double volume issue of Raven: A Journal of Vexillology, a peer-reviewed journal published by the North American Vexillological Association. The book is the first comprehensive work on the subject, documenting the municipal flags of the largest 100 U.S. cities, all 50 state capitals, and at least two cities in each state. Each article describes in detail the flag's design, adoption date, proportions, symbolism, selection, designer, and predecessors.

== Publication and background ==
Authored by John M. Purcell, American City Flags: 150 Flags from Akron to Yonkers was published by the North American Vexillological Association (NAVA) in April 2004. Purcell, a former president of NAVA, along with other vexillologists, spent 40 years researching flags. The book presents the results of their work. When the book was published, Purcell was a resident of Middleburg Heights, Ohio, and had retired from being a Spanish language and education professor at Cleveland State University.

From his youth, he had become drawn to flags after a person gifted him a world map containing around 25 flags on the edge, intended to be detached and matched to the corresponding places. In 1999, NAVA gave him the Whitney, an award commemorating the noted vexillologist Whitney Smith. Living in Cincinnati in the 1960s, Purcell initially considered authoring a book about cities' flags but realized that the expense of the color plates, which he deemed crucial, made the work financially infeasible. Ted Kaye oversaw a city flags survey that served as the foundation for the book and acted as the book's editor.

== Content ==
Included in the book are 150 articles examining the flags each of the country's 50 state capitals as well as its 100 biggest cities. NAVA asked its members and the public to give flags' designs scores from 0 to 10. Aside from its members, around 400 people took part in NAVA's online survey about flags that ran for five months. For every state, the book covers at a minimum of two cities' flags. The 20 best-rated flags excluded city seals and words.

Washington, D.C.; Chicago; Denver; Phoenix; St. Louis; Wichita; Portland, Oregon; Indianapolis; Louisville; and Corpus Christi ranked as the top 10 city flags. The 10 worst flags were from Pocatello; Huntington; Rapid City; Milwaukee; Mesa; Hialeah; Lubbock; Provo; Cedar Rapids; Montpelier. 75% of the flags were rated fewer than five points.

== See also ==
- Vexillology

== Publication details ==
- Purcell, John M.; Croft, James A.; Monahan, Rich (2003). American City Flags: 150 Flags from Akron to Yonkers. Trenton, NJ: North American Vexillological Association. ISBN 978-0-9747728-0-6.
