= Littlefield Municipal Airport =

- IATA: none; ICAO: KLIU; FAA LID: LIU

Summary
- Airport type: Public
- Owner: City of Littlefield
- Serves: Littlefield, Texas
- Elevation AMSL: 3,616 ft / 1,102 m
- Coordinates: 33°55′26″N 102°23′12″W

Map

Runways
Direction	Length		Surface
Direction	ft	m	Surface
1/19	4,021	1,226	Asphalt
13/31	2,513	766	Asphalt

Statistics (2009)
- Aircraft operations: 7,025
- Based aircraft: 24
- Source: Federal Aviation Administration

Littlefield Municipal Airport (ICAO: KLIU, FAA LID: LIU) is three miles west of Littlefield, in Lamb County, Texas.

Most U.S. airports use the same three-letter location identifier for the FAA and IATA, but this airport is LIU to the FAA and has no IATA code.

== Facilities ==
The airport covers 226 acres (91 ha) at an elevation of 3,616 feet (1,102 m). It has two asphalt runways: 1/19 is 4,021 by 60 feet (1,226 x 18 m) and 13/31 is 2,513 by 40 feet (766 x 12 m).

In the year ending June 24, 2009 the airport had 7,025 aircraft operations, average 19 per day: 99.6% general aviation and 0.4% military. 24 aircraft were then based at this airport: 50% single-engine, 4% jet, 42% glider and 4% ultralight.

== See also ==
- List of airports in Texas
