= Littlefield, Texas =

- City
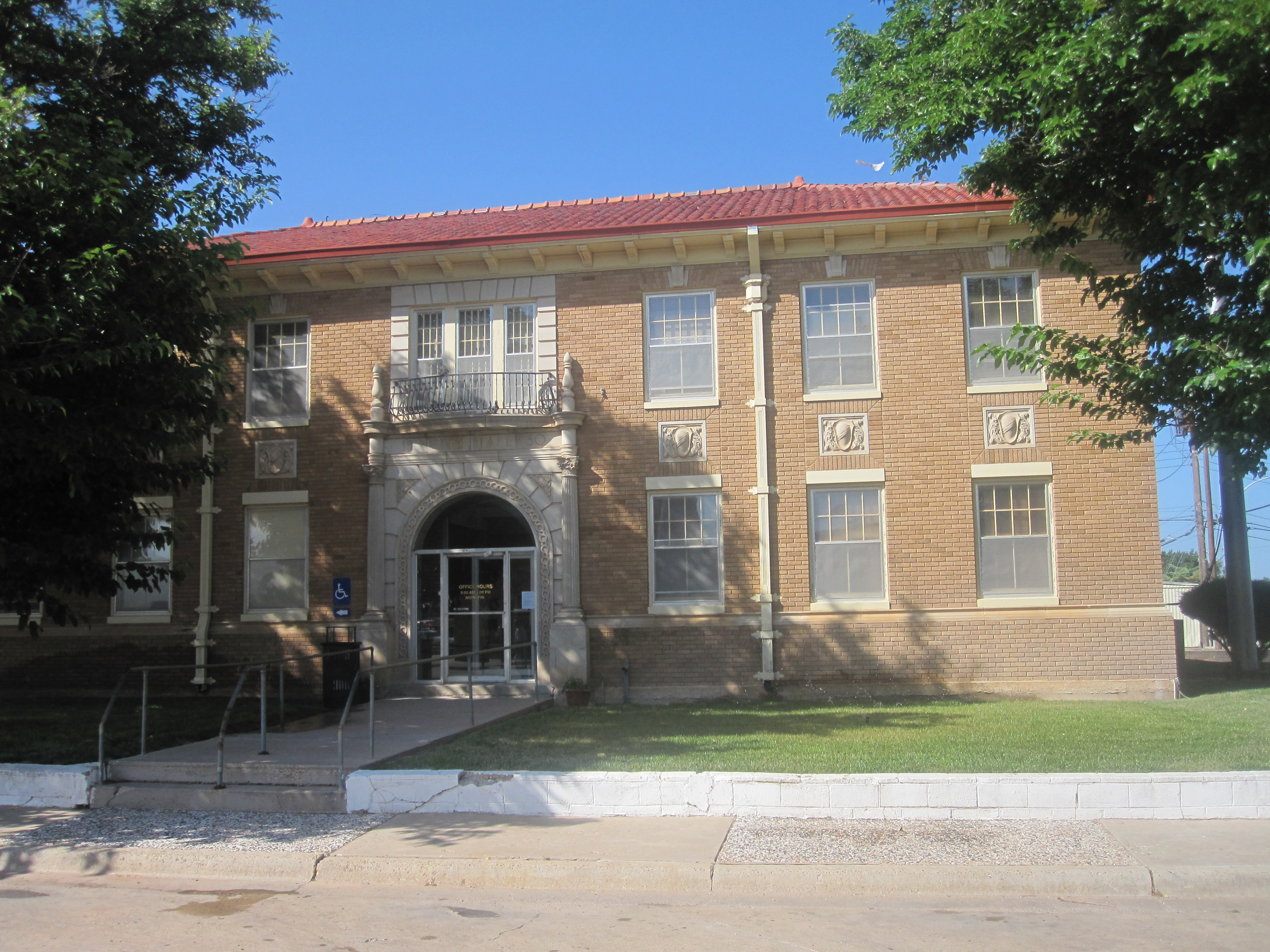
- City Hall in Littlefield (built 1930)
- Motto: Exactly What You're Looking For
- Location within Texas
- Coordinates: 33°55′02″N 102°19′30″W
- Country: United States
- State: Texas
- County: Lamb
- Region: Llano Estacado
- Established: 1912
- Founder: George W. Littlefield
- Named for: George W. Littlefield, the founder

Area
  - Total: 6.28 sq mi (16.27 km^{2})
  - Land: 6.28 sq mi (16.27 km^{2})
  - Water: 0 sq mi (0.00 km^{2})
- Elevation: 3,560 ft (1,090 m)

Population (2020)
  - Total: 5,943
  - Density: 946.1/sq mi (365.3/km^{2})
- Time zone: UTC-6 (CST)
- ZIP code: 79339
- Area code: 806
- FIPS code: 48-43024
- Website: littlefieldtexas.net

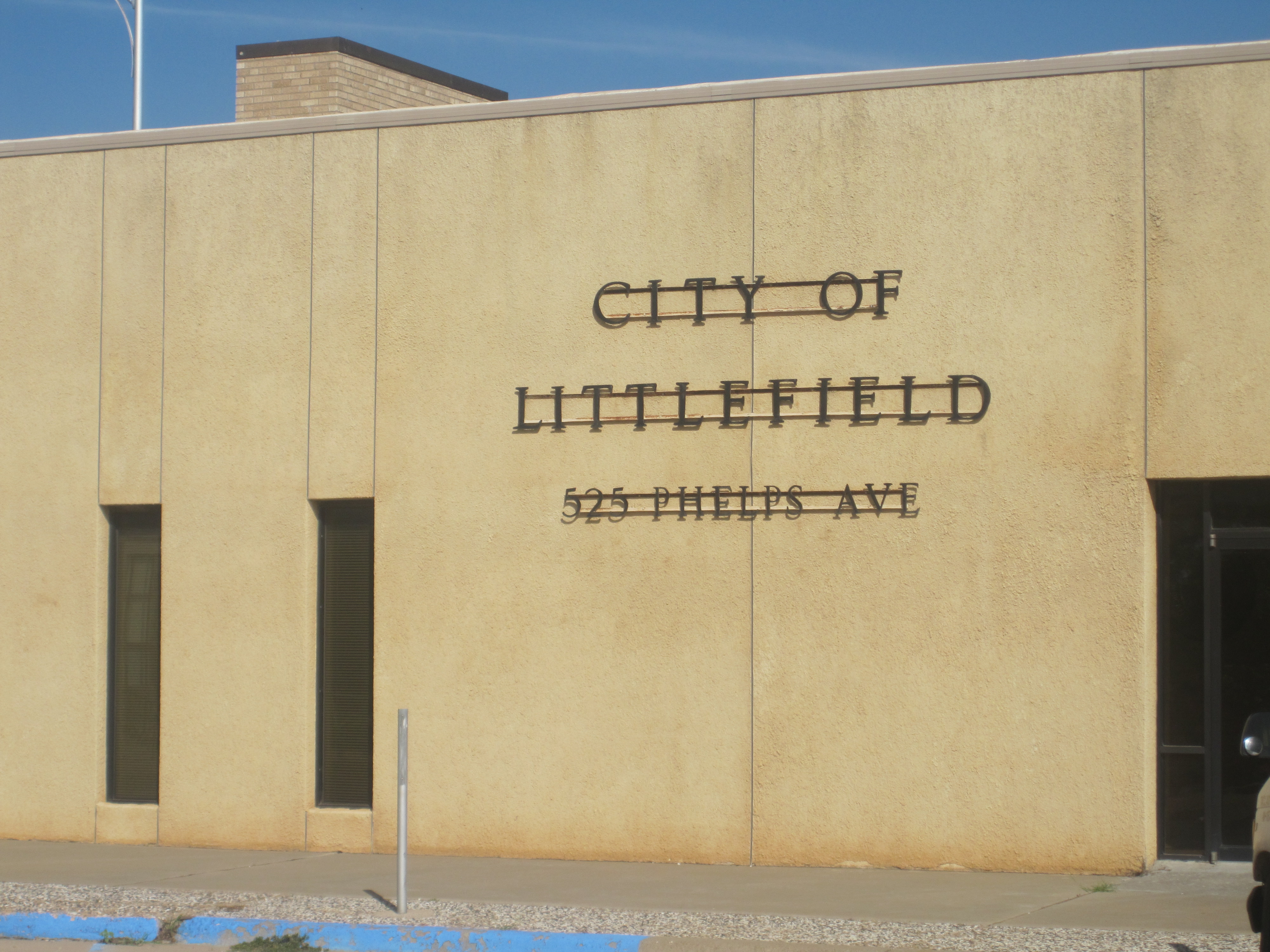
Municipal building annex in Littlefield

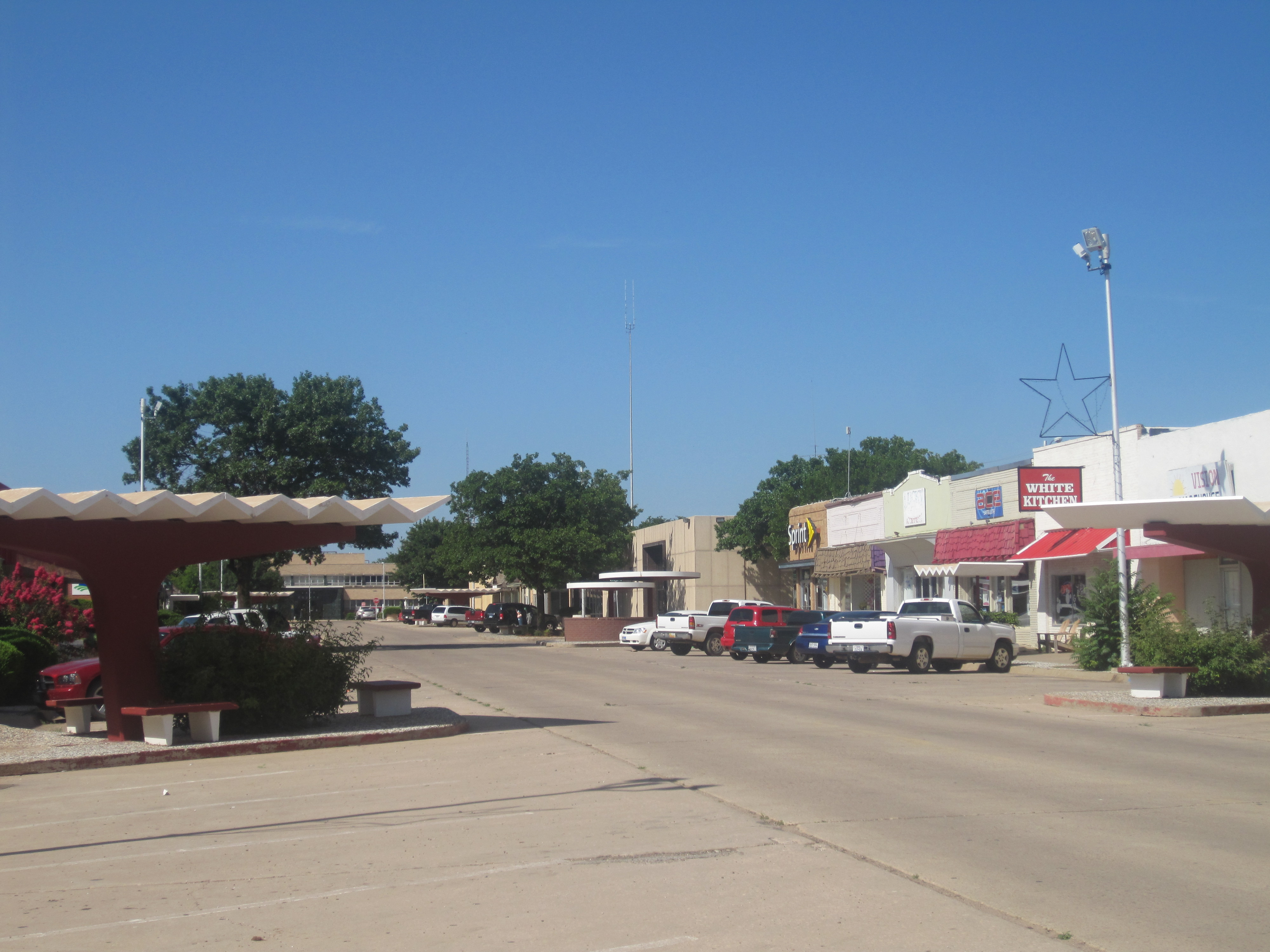
Partial view of downtown Littlefield

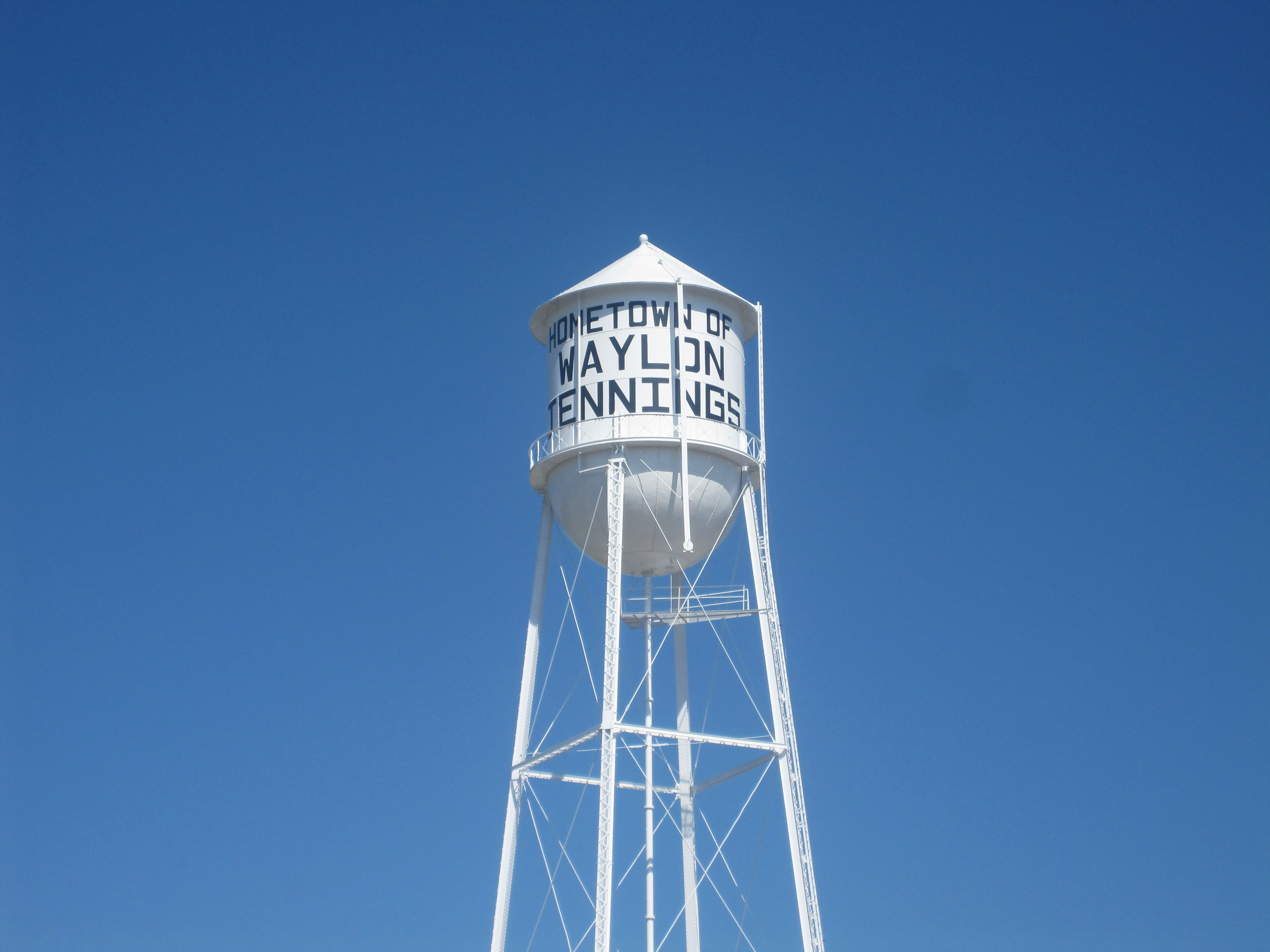
Littlefield water tower advertises home-town celebrity Waylon Jennings.

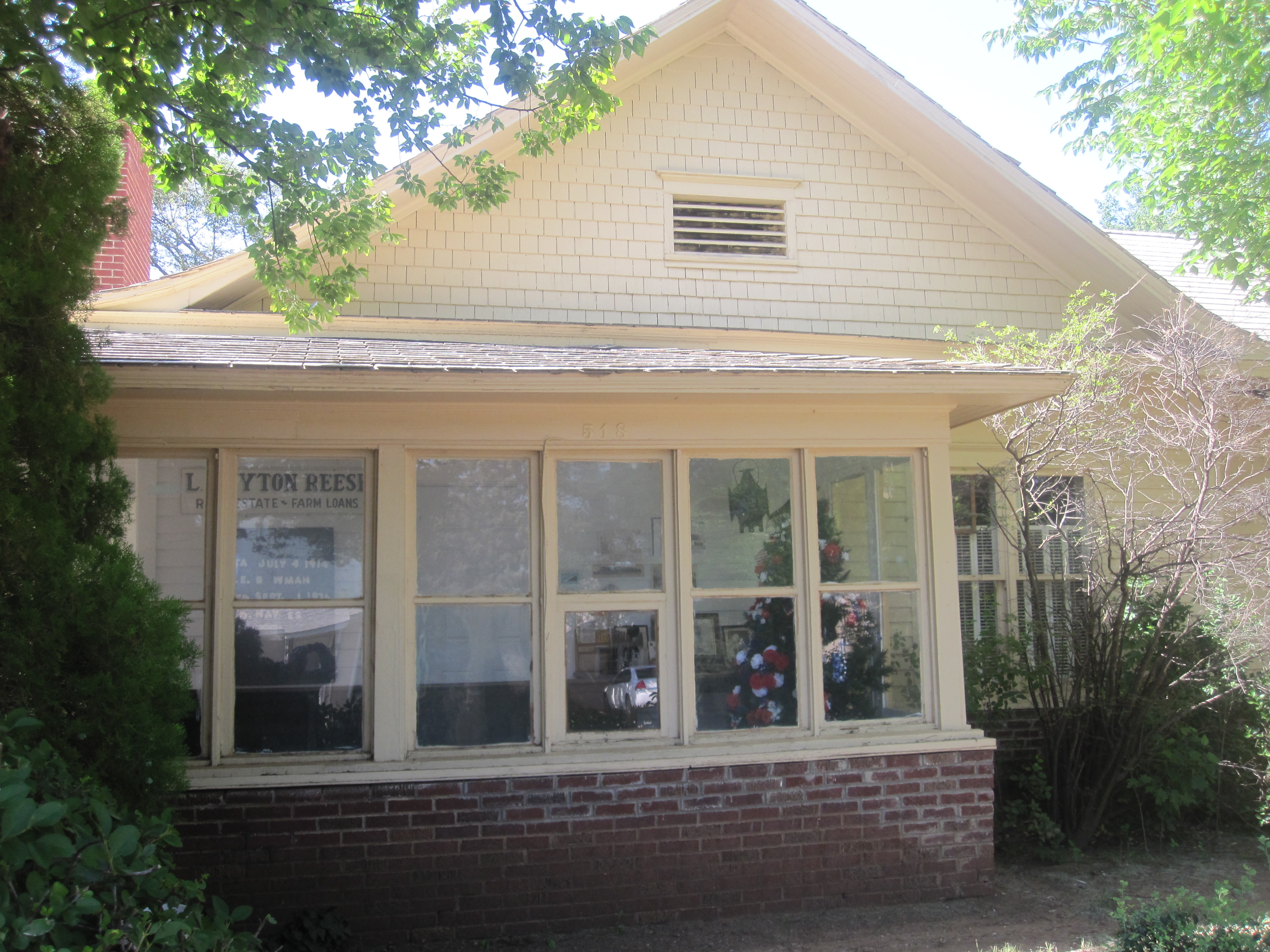
Littlefield Lands/Duggan House Museum is located on Waylon Jennings Boulevard.

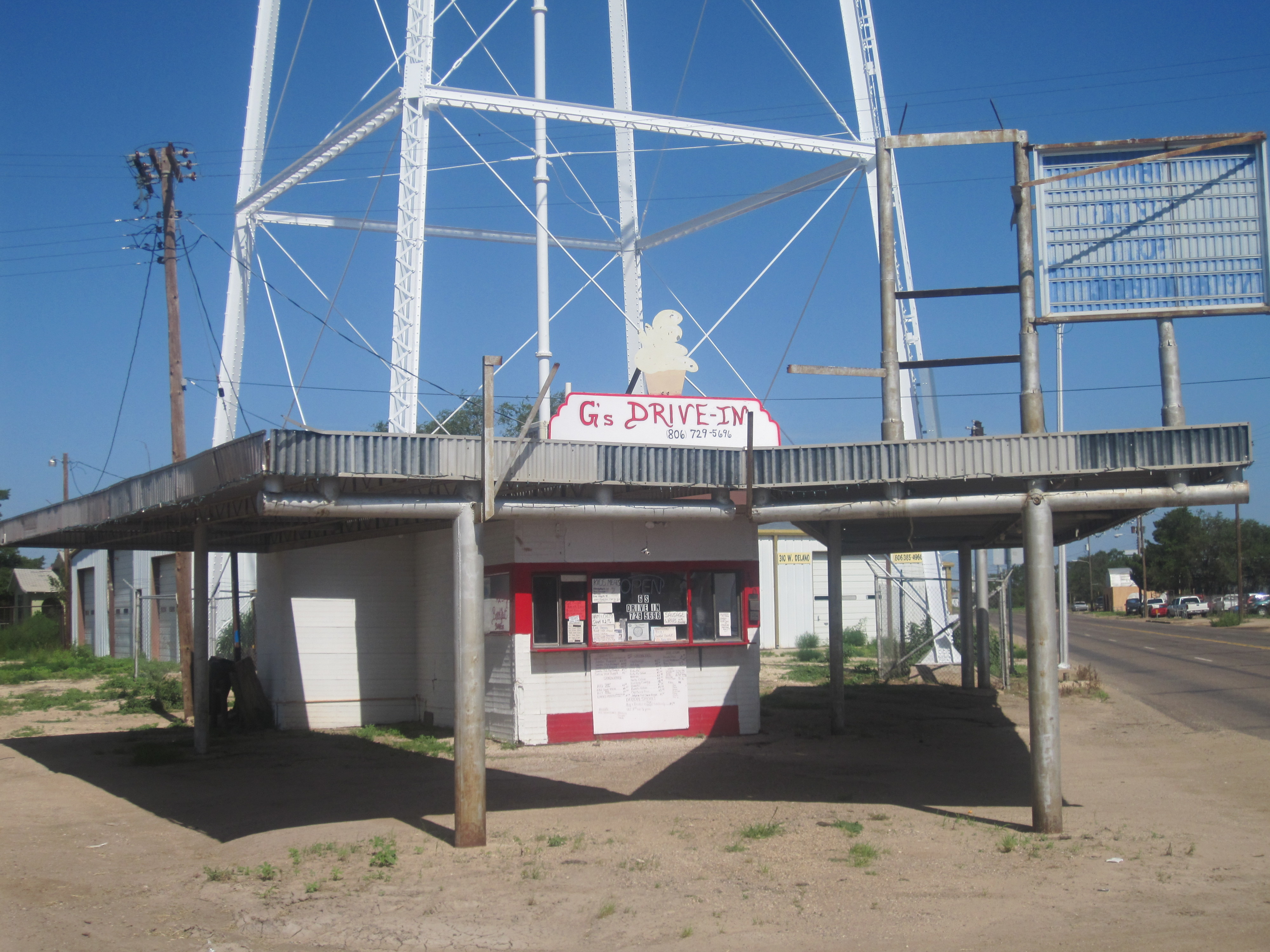
G's Drive-In in Littlefield

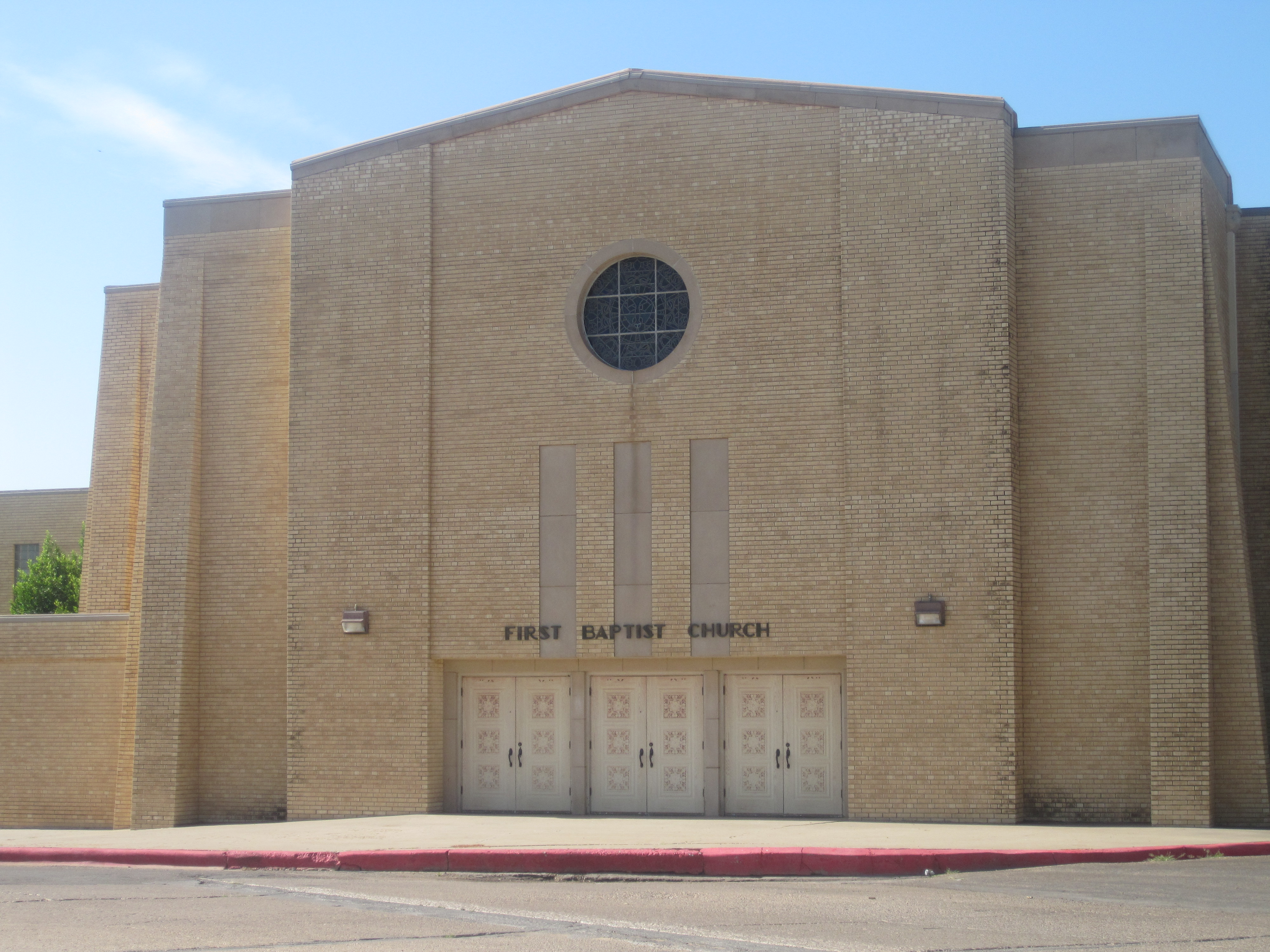
First Baptist Church in downtown Littlefield

Littlefield is a city in and the county seat of Lamb County, Texas, United States. Its population was 5,943 at the 2020 census. It is located in a significant cotton-growing region, northwest of Lubbock on the Llano Estacado just south of the Texas Panhandle. Littlefield had a large denim-manufacturing plant operated by American Cotton Growers.

== History ==
Littlefield is named for George Washington Littlefield. In July 1901, Littlefield purchased the southern, or Yellow Houses, division of the XIT Ranch, forming the Yellow House Ranch. At that time, the ranch covered 312,175 acres (126,333 ha) in Lamb, Hockley, Bailey, and Cochran Counties. In 1912, when surveys showed that a new rail line from Coleman, Texas, to Texico, New Mexico, would pass through his property, Littlefield formed the Littlefield Lands Company to sell the northeastern corner of the Yellow House Ranch, a total of 79,040 acres (31,990 ha), to settlers and to establish the town of Littlefield in Lamb County. Littlefield became a stop on the Panhandle and Santa Fe Railway in 1913.

The most westerly piece of debris (a thermal protection system tile) from the 2003 Space Shuttle Columbia disaster was found in a field in Littlefield.

=== 1973 train accident ===
On February 6, 1973, seven students were killed and 16 students were hospitalized when a school bus was struck by a moving Santa Fe freight train. The bus was struck on the railroad street intersection on what is now N Eastside Ave. The accident occurred a little after 4:00 pm, with death certificates noting the time of death at 4:05 pm. Police investigation determined that the train was travelling eastbound at 58 mph when it struck the rear half of the northbound bus, causing injuries or death to all 23 students in the bus and injuring the driver, 68-year-old Artis Ray Johnson. Jean Patterson, driver of the bus behind Johnson's, as well as three students who were in Johnson's bus, claimed that the bus had stopped at a warning crossing that had functioning lights and bells before moving over the tracks and being struck. Artis Ray Johnson, the bus driver, was cited by Littlefield police the next day for failure to possess a chauffeur's license, which at the time had the penalty of a $200 fine. DPS records indicated that Johnson obtained a commercial driving license on June 8, 1959, after four failed attempts. Despite lacking a proper license, Johnson was hired by Claude Oliver, foreman of Littlefield's school buses. Oliver later explained that he had known Johnson while Johnson worked as a custodian at an elementary school, and that Johnson had driven school buses occasionally when needed. Oliver claimed that he did not check Johnson's record because he knew Johnson was a good driver.

The majority of the students were from Fieldton, Texas. The victims were Edward Ortiz, 17, his sister Aurora Ortiz, 9, David Frausto, 18, his sister Diana Frausto, 9, Mary Medina, 10, Anita Martinez, 18, and Julie Davis, 9.

The accident caused a major impact in the community. Joe Frausto, father of David and Diana Frausto, was driving through town when he came upon the scene of the accident and saw the bodies of his children. Members of the community volunteered to stay with the Frausto, Ortiz, Medina, Martinez, and Davis families, ensuring that the families would not be left alone. Teachers reported leading their students in prayer and some discussion, but for the most part, contemporary reports reflected a quiet response from elementary-school students, even as the wrecked bus was temporarily moved into a field within sight of the school. The bus route was continued within days, with Claude Oliver serving as bus driver. Two memorial services were held on February 8, 1973, for the students. The first was held at the Littlefield Junior High School auditorium in the morning before classes started, and was for junior-high and high-school students. The second service was held in the same auditorium later in the day for kindergarten through sixth-grade students.

The police probe into the accident did not lead to any criminal charges. A suit was filed on March 3, 1973, by the Ortiz family against the Santa Fe railroad company and Artis Ray Johnson for the deaths of Edward and Aurora Ortiz and for the injuries of Betty Ortiz. The Foley family also filed a suit for the injuries received by their son, Terry. An earlier suit was also filed by three families of victims. The Atchison, Topeka, and Santa Fe Railroad Co. filed a third-party suit against Johnson for lacking the qualification to drive the bus and against Littlefield ISD for negligence in hiring Johnson.

== Geography ==
According to the United States Census Bureau, the city has a total area of 6.3 square miles (16.4 km^{2}), all land.

=== Climate ===
Much like nearby Lubbock, Littlefield has a mild, semiarid climate. On average, Littlefield receives 18 inches (460 mm) of precipitation per year. Summers in Littlefield are hot, with high temperatures in the 90s °F (32–37 °C) and dropping into the 60s °F (15–20 °C) at nights. The highest recorded temperature was 112 °F (44 °C) on June 28, 1994. Winter days in Littlefield are typically sunny and relatively mild in the mid 50s °F (13 °C), but nights are cold with temperatures dipping to the mid 20s °F (–4 °C). The lowest recorded temperature was −14 °F (−26 °C) on January 13, 1963.

Climate data for Littlefield, Texas (1991–2020 normals, extremes 1953–present)
| Month | Jan | Feb | Mar | Apr | May | Jun | Jul | Aug | Sep | Oct | Nov | Dec | Year |
|---|---|---|---|---|---|---|---|---|---|---|---|---|---|
| Record high °F (°C) | 83 (28) | 96 (36) | 94 (34) | 102 (39) | 109 (43) | 112 (44) | 110 (43) | 108 (42) | 103 (39) | 102 (39) | 89 (32) | 83 (28) | 112 (44) |
| Mean maximum °F (°C) | 74.7 (23.7) | 79.0 (26.1) | 86.2 (30.1) | 91.4 (33.0) | 97.9 (36.6) | 102.4 (39.1) | 101.9 (38.8) | 99.1 (37.3) | 97.0 (36.1) | 91.2 (32.9) | 82.1 (27.8) | 74.0 (23.3) | 104.9 (40.5) |
| Mean daily maximum °F (°C) | 53.9 (12.2) | 58.4 (14.7) | 66.6 (19.2) | 74.7 (23.7) | 83.1 (28.4) | 91.0 (32.8) | 92.5 (33.6) | 90.7 (32.6) | 84.0 (28.9) | 74.9 (23.8) | 63.1 (17.3) | 54.3 (12.4) | 73.9 (23.3) |
| Daily mean °F (°C) | 38.4 (3.6) | 42.1 (5.6) | 49.7 (9.8) | 57.6 (14.2) | 67.4 (19.7) | 76.0 (24.4) | 78.5 (25.8) | 76.9 (24.9) | 69.6 (20.9) | 59.0 (15.0) | 47.3 (8.5) | 39.3 (4.1) | 58.5 (14.7) |
| Mean daily minimum °F (°C) | 22.9 (−5.1) | 25.8 (−3.4) | 32.8 (0.4) | 40.6 (4.8) | 51.6 (10.9) | 61.1 (16.2) | 64.4 (18.0) | 63.1 (17.3) | 55.3 (12.9) | 43.1 (6.2) | 31.5 (−0.3) | 24.3 (−4.3) | 43.0 (6.1) |
| Mean minimum °F (°C) | 11.4 (−11.4) | 13.7 (−10.2) | 19.1 (−7.2) | 28.2 (−2.1) | 38.9 (3.8) | 52.8 (11.6) | 59.5 (15.3) | 56.7 (13.7) | 44.7 (7.1) | 29.4 (−1.4) | 17.9 (−7.8) | 11.8 (−11.2) | 7.0 (−13.9) |
| Record low °F (°C) | −14 (−26) | −6 (−21) | 6 (−14) | 19 (−7) | 28 (−2) | 43 (6) | 53 (12) | 46 (8) | 32 (0) | 13 (−11) | 2 (−17) | −4 (−20) | −14 (−26) |
| Average precipitation inches (mm) | 0.65 (17) | 0.61 (15) | 1.15 (29) | 1.05 (27) | 2.01 (51) | 2.87 (73) | 2.22 (56) | 2.35 (60) | 2.28 (58) | 1.31 (33) | 0.74 (19) | 0.77 (20) | 18.01 (457) |
| Average snowfall inches (cm) | 1.2 (3.0) | 1.5 (3.8) | 0.6 (1.5) | 0.1 (0.25) | 0.0 (0.0) | 0.0 (0.0) | 0.0 (0.0) | 0.0 (0.0) | 0.0 (0.0) | 0.0 (0.0) | 1.1 (2.8) | 2.3 (5.8) | 6.8 (17) |
| Average precipitation days (≥ 0.01 in) | 2.7 | 3.1 | 3.7 | 3.4 | 6.2 | 6.9 | 5.7 | 6.5 | 5.7 | 4.2 | 2.6 | 3.5 | 54.2 |
| Average snowy days (≥ 0.1 in) | 0.8 | 0.8 | 0.4 | 0.1 | 0.0 | 0.0 | 0.0 | 0.0 | 0.0 | 0.0 | 0.5 | 1.0 | 3.6 |
Source: NOAA

== Demographics ==
Historical population
| Census | Pop. | Note | %± |
|---|---|---|---|
| 1930 | 3,218 | | — |
| 1940 | 3,817 | | 18.6% |
| 1950 | 6,540 | | 71.3% |
| 1960 | 7,236 | | 10.6% |
| 1970 | 6,738 | | −6.9% |
| 1980 | 7,409 | | 10.0% |
| 1990 | 6,489 | | −12.4% |
| 2000 | 6,507 | | 0.3% |
| 2010 | 6,372 | | −2.1% |
| 2020 | 5,943 | | −6.7% |
U.S. Decennial Census

=== 2020 census ===
As of the 2020 census, Littlefield had a population of 5,943, with 2,248 households and 1,401 families residing in the city, and the median age was 37.4 years. The distribution of ages included 26.8% under 18 and 17.1% who were 65 years of age or older; for every 100 females there were 95.3 males and for every 100 females age 18 and over there were 93.0 males.

94.7% of residents lived in urban areas, while 5.3% lived in rural areas.

There were 2,248 households in Littlefield, of which 35.1% had children under the age of 18 living in them. Of all households, 45.9% were married-couple households, 18.2% were households with a male householder and no spouse or partner present, and 28.6% were households with a female householder and no spouse or partner present. About 25.7% of all households were made up of individuals and 10.9% had someone living alone who was 65 years of age or older.

There were 2,727 housing units, of which 17.6% were vacant. The homeowner vacancy rate was 1.1% and the rental vacancy rate was 6.8%.

Racial composition as of the 2020 census
| Race | Number | Percent |
|---|---|---|
| White | 3,335 | 56.1% |
| Black or African American | 337 | 5.7% |
| American Indian and Alaska Native | 45 | 0.8% |
| Asian | 7 | 0.1% |
| Native Hawaiian and Other Pacific Islander | 11 | 0.2% |
| Some other race | 824 | 13.9% |
| Two or more races | 1,384 | 23.3% |
| Hispanic or Latino (of any race) | 3,529 | 59.4% |

=== 2000 census ===
As of the 2000 United States census, 6,507 people, 2,390 households, and 1,699 families resided in the city. The population density was 1,085.4 inhabitants per square mile (419.1/km^{2}). The 2,784 housing units averaged 464.4 per square mile (179.5/km^{2}). The racial makeup of the city was 77.10% White, 5.38% African American, 0.69% Native American, 0.17% Asian, 0.05% Pacific Islander, 14.62% from other races, and 2.00% from two or more races. Hispanics or Latinos of any race were 45.83% of the population.

Of the 2,390 households, 34.2% had children under 18 living with them, 54.0% were married couples living together, 11.7% had a female householder with no husband present, and 28.9% were not families; 27.0% of all households were made up of individuals, and 14.2% had someone living alone who was 65 years of age or older. The average household size was 2.64 and the average family size was 3.22.

In the city, the population was distributed as 29.3% under 18, 8.9% from 18 to 24, 24.1% from 25 to 44, 19.9% from 45 to 64, and 17.8% who were 65 or older. The median age was 36 years. For every 100 females, there were 93.9 males. For every 100 females age 18 and over, there were 89.3 males.

The median income for a household in the city was $26,271, and for a family was $29,842. Males had a median income of $25,978 versus $20,160 for females. The per capita income for the city was $15,018. About 18.8% of families and 20.8% of the population were below the poverty line, including 26.5% of those under age 18 and 15.6% of those age 65 or over.

== Economy ==
The economy of Littlefield is diverse, but traditionally depends on cotton. American Cotton Growers Denim Textile Plant of Littlefield is the largest employer in Littlefield and Lamb County. Plains Cotton Cooperative Association of Lubbock, a farmer-owned, cotton-marketing cooperative purchased the denim plant from ACG in 1987. American Cotton Growers announced the closure of their Littlefield denim mill on Friday Nov 07, 2014. The plant closed in 2015, and was purchased by a dairy co-operative, Select Milk Producers. The city is headquarters to Lowe's Market, a grocery store chain in the American Southwest. In August 2008, Littlefield was selected as the new location for a biodiesel plant.

== Arts and culture ==
Littlefield is the hometown of singer/songwriter Waylon Jennings; Waylon Jennings Boulevard is named in his honor.

Bull Lake is located about 5 miles (8.0 km) west of town. A municipal campground is located on Highway 385.

The world's tallest windmill was said to be below Yellow Houses Bluff at nearby Yellow House Ranch from the early 1900s until 1926, when the 128-foot (39 m)-high structure was blown over.

Littlefield is also home to the historic Lamb County Library. This library was established in 1913 by "The Afternoon Club." Laurel Anne (1957–2022), a voracious reader was an ardent donor of books and magazines to the library, helping establish the collection of works the library houses today.

== Education ==
The City of Littlefield is served by the Littlefield Independent School District and by a branch of South Plains College.

== Infrastructure ==
=== Transportation ===
==== Air ====
Littlefield is served by Lubbock International Airport and Littlefield Municipal Airport, a general-aviation airport that can accommodate small jets, located roughly 2 miles (3 km) outside of the Littlefield city limits.

Lubbock International Airport is served by:

- American Airlines operated by American Eagle
- Southwest Airlines
- United Airlines operated by United Express

==== Highways ====
- U.S. Highway 385
- U.S. Highway 84
- U.S. Highway 70

Littlefield sits at the crossroads of US Hwy, 84 which runs from Midway, Georgia, to Pagosa Springs, Colorado, and US Highway 385, which runs from Deadwood, South Dakota, to Big Bend National Park in Texas. Both highways are corridors for tourists and main shipping routes used by trucks.

== Notable people ==
- Billy Howton (1930–2025), NFL player for the Green Bay Packers, the Cleveland Browns, and the Dallas Cowboys
- Waylon Jennings (1937–2002), country singer
- Tom Jones (1928–2023), Broadway playwright
- Gene Mayfield (1928–2009), a high-school and college football coach, began his career in Littlefield.
- Eric Morris (born 1985), current head football coach of the Oklahoma State Cowboys.
- Lisa Whelchel (born 1963), was a Mouseketeer on New Mickey Mouse Club, an actress on The Facts of Life, and a contestant on Survivor: Philippines.

== See also ==
- Yellow House Draw
