= List of public art in Austin, Texas =

List of public artworks in Austin, Texas, U.S.

The city of Austin, Texas, in the United States, has an extensive public art collection. Many public artworks are installed at the Texas State Capitol, the Texas State Cemetery, and on the University of Texas at Austin campus.

The Art in Public Places program was established by the Austin City Council in 1985. By ordinance, up to 2 percent of eligible capital improvement project budgets is allocated toward commission and acquiring visual artwork for the city's civic spaces.

== Outdoor sculptures ==
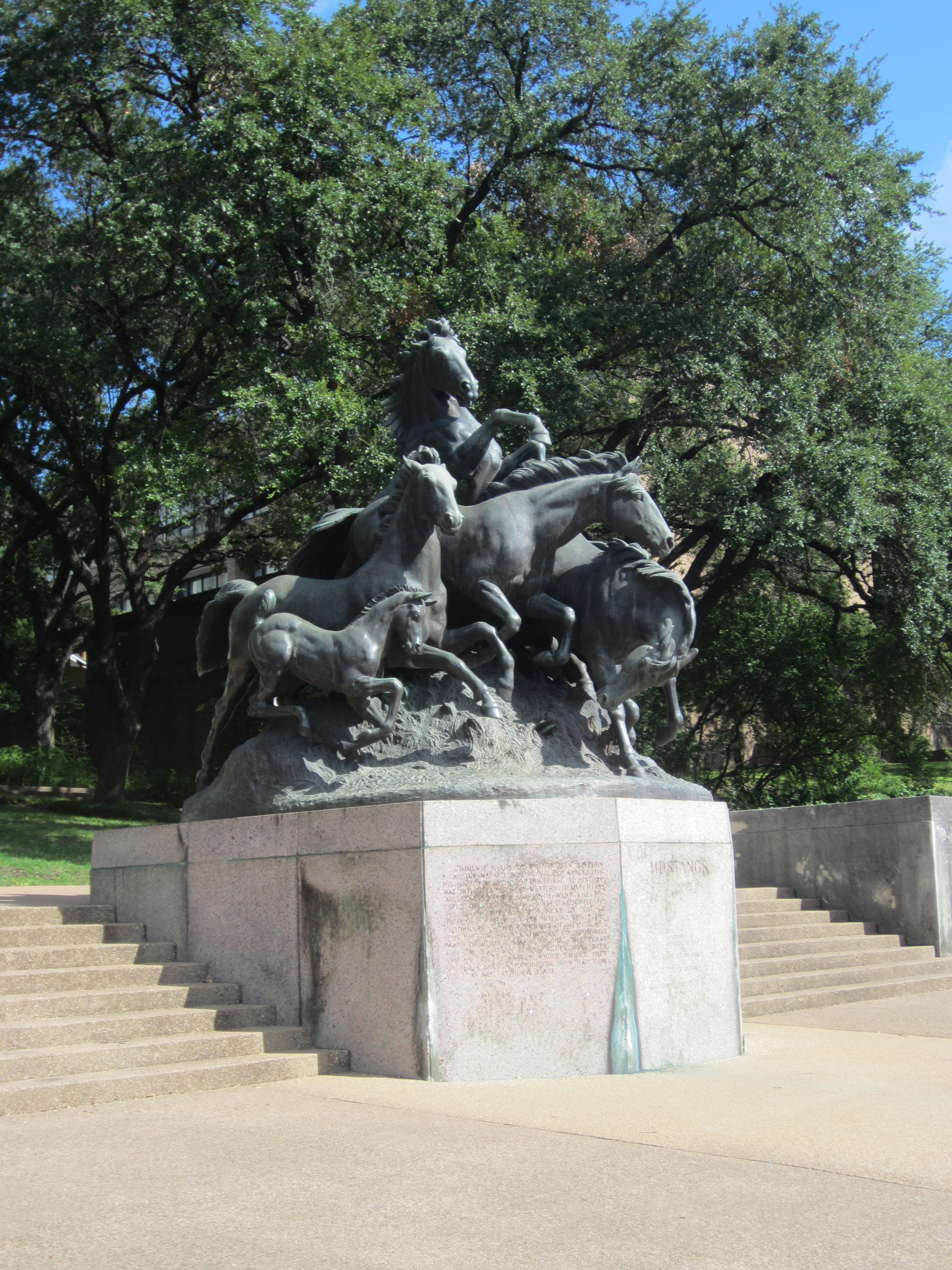
The Seven Mustangs

- Circle with Towers, University of Texas at Austin
- Clock Knot, University of Texas at Austin
- The Family Group, University of Texas at Austin
- Littlefield Fountain, University of Texas at Austin
- Monochrome for Austin, University of Texas at Austin
- The Seven Mustangs, University of Texas at Austin
- Square Tilt, University of Texas at Austin
- Statue of Albert Sidney Johnston (University of Texas at Austin)
- Statue of Barbara Jordan (Austin–Bergstrom International Airport)
- Statue of Barbara Jordan (University of Texas at Austin)
- Statue of Cesar Chavez, University of Texas at Austin
- Statue of George Washington
- Statue of Jefferson Davis, formerly installed on the University of Texas at Austin campus
- Statue of Jim Hogg
- Statue of John Henninger Reagan
- Statue of Martin Luther King Jr., University of Texas at Austin
- Statue of Robert E. Lee
- Statue of Woodrow Wilson
- Stevie Ray Vaughan Memorial
- The Torchbearers, University of Texas at Austin
- Willie Nelson statue, Block 21

=== Texas State Capitol ===
Tejano Monument

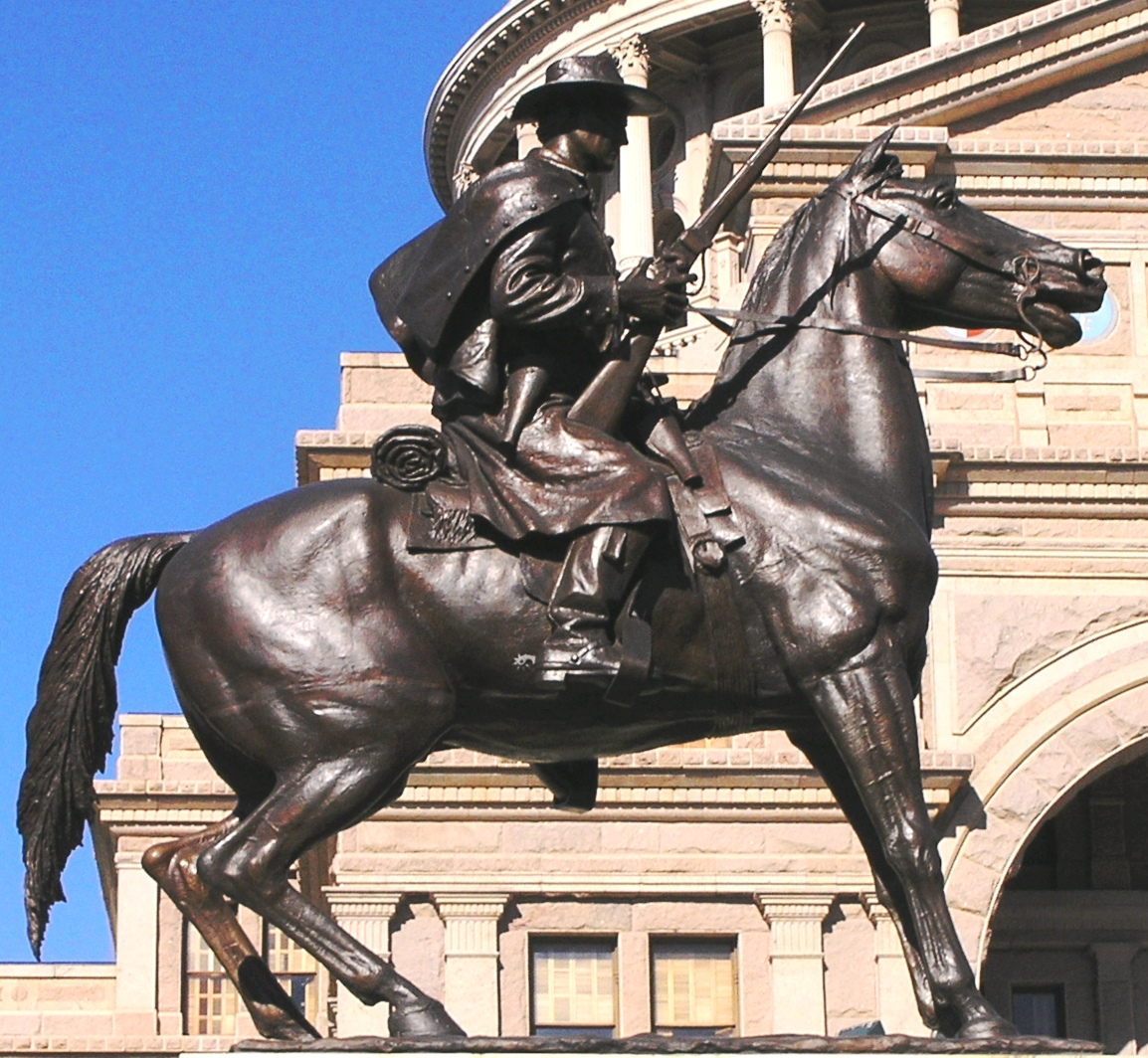
Terry's Texas Rangers Monument

Sculptures inside the Texas State Capitol include Sam Houston and Stephen F. Austin. Sculptures installed outside include:

- Confederate Soldiers Monument
- Disabled American Veterans of Texas Monument
- Heroes of the Alamo Monument
- Hood's Texas Brigade Monument
- Korean War Veterans Memorial
- Pearl Harbor Monument
- Strengthen the Arm of Liberty Monument
- Tejano Monument
- Ten Commandments Monument
- Terry's Texas Rangers Monument
- Texas African American History Memorial
- Texas Capitol Vietnam Veterans Monument
- Texas Cowboy Monument
- Texas Peace Officers' Memorial
- Texas Pioneer Woman Monument
- Texas World War II Memorial
- The Hiker
- Tribute to Texas Children Monument
- Veterans of the 36th Infantry, Texas National Guard Monument
- Volunteer Firemen Monument
- World War I Monument

=== Texas State Cemetery ===
- Gold Star Mothers Memorial
- Medal of Honor Monument
- Nine Men of Praha Monument
- Purple Heart Monument
- September 11, 2001 Monument
- Statue of Albert Sidney Johnston
- Vietnam Memorial

== Paintings ==
- Dawn at the Alamo (1905), Texas State Capitol
- Larry Monroe Forever Bridge
- Surrender of Santa Anna (1886), Texas State Capitol
- The Battle of San Jacinto, Texas State Capitol
