= The Family Group =

The Family Group may refer to:

- The Family Group (Geise), a sculpture by John Geise at the University of Oregon in Eugene, Oregon, US
- The Family Group (Umlauf), a sculpture by Charles Umlauf at the University of Texas at Austin in Austin, Texas, US
- Family Group (Moore), a sculpture by Henry Moore created for Barclay School in Stevenage, Hertfordshire, England
