= Monochrome for Austin =

Sculpture in Austin, Texas, U.S.

- The sculpture in 2018
- Artist: Nancy Rubins
- Year: 2015
- Medium: Stainless steel and aluminum
- Dimensions: 15 m × 16 m × 12 m (50 ft × 52 ft × 41 ft)
- Weight: 16,000 lb (7,300 kg)
- Location: Austin, Texas, United States
- Coordinates: 30.287503°N 97.737116°W
- Owner: University of Texas at Austin
- Website: landmarks.utexas.edu/artwork/monochrome-austin

Monochrome for Austin is an outdoor sculpture by Nancy Rubins, installed outside the Hackerman Building on the University of Texas at Austin campus, in the U.S. state of Texas. The 50-foot-tall (15 m) work was installed in 2015 as part of the university's Landmarks public art program.

== See also ==
- 2015 in art
