= Circle with Towers =

Sculpture in Austin, Texas, U.S.

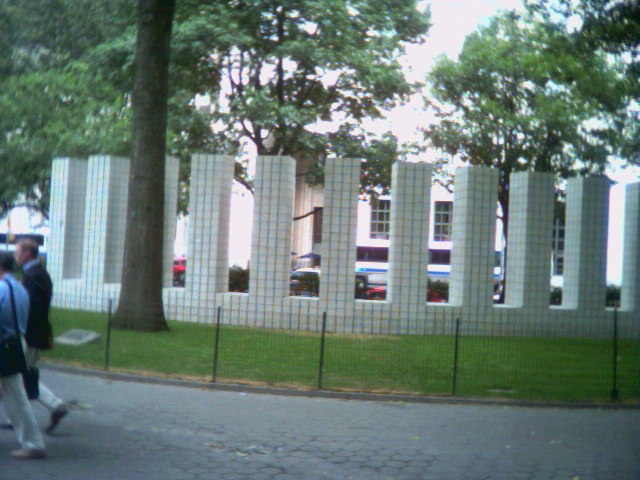
- The sculpture installed in Madison Square Park in 2005
- Artist: Sol LeWitt
- Medium: Concrete block
- Dimensions: 430 cm (168 in); 780 cm diameter (308 in)
- Location: Austin, Texas, United States
- Coordinates: 30.2863°N 97.7369°W
- Owner: University of Texas at Austin

Circle with Towers is a concrete block 2005/2012 sculpture by American artist Sol LeWitt, installed outside the Bill and Melinda Gates Computer Science Complex on the University of Texas at Austin campus in Austin, Texas, United States. Previously, the artwork was installed in Madison Square Park; the university's public art program, Landmarks, purchased the sculpture from the Madison Square Park Conservancy.
