= Armando Hinojosa =

American sculptor (born 1944)

Armando Garcia Hinojosa
- Born: 1944 (age 81–82); Laredo, Webb County; Texas, U.S.
- Education: Texas A&M University - Kingsville
- Occupations: Artist and sculptor
- Spouse: Married
- Children: Dr. Armando R. Hinojosa David Andrew Hinojosa Melissa Joy Hinojosa
- Website: armandohinojosa.com

Armando Garcia Hinojosa (born 1944) is an artist and educator from Laredo, Texas, who is known for some half dozen major pieces of sculpture, including the massive Tejano Monument on the south lawn of the Texas State Capitol in Austin. The 12-piece monument was unveiled in the spring of 2012.

== Sculptor ==
Hinojosa's Tejano monument includes a Spanish explorer, a mustang-riding vaquero, a mother and father with their newborn infant, a boy with a strong-willed goat, a girl filling a water jug, and two longhorn cattle made of bronze. The statues are mounted on a granite base, which was quarried in Marble Falls in Burnet County, Texas. The significance of each character on the monument is described by a bronze plaque. In 2001, Hinojosa was chosen from among several Texas artists to create the monument.

The pieces were cast at the Larry Stevens foundry in Bulverde in Comal County, Texas. According to Stevens, ten steps are involved in the process: "The artist sculpts it in clay, then we make a mold and fill that with wax, then we cover it with slurry, then we burn out the wax and pour in the molten bronze. There are a lot more steps. It gets pretty complicated." The largest on any state capitol grounds, the Tejano Monument honors native-born Texans of Hispanic descent since the year 1519, when Alonzo Alvarez de Pineda mapped the Texas Gulf Coast. Stevens estimates that the two longhorns weigh six to eight hundred pounds each: "You can't learn this in art school. I learned it from a friend at a foundry in Fort Worth. It's kind of an apprenticeship. There's lots of trial and error, lots of looking, measuring, looking some more, welding, pounding. I've had to remelt a lot of pieces over my career. We make the sculptor look good, He's the artist and we're the artisans."

The Texas State Legislature approved the monument in 2009. The Texas State Preservation Board accepted the design without dissent in 2010. The state provided just over half of the $2 million cost of the monument. The remainder was raised privately, with major contributions from the International Bank of Commerce, American Electric Power, and American Telephone and Telegraph.

Other Hinojosa works include the life-sized replica of Admiral Chester Nimitz at the entrance to SeaWorld in San Antonio and the Double Eagle, a 9-foot high, 14-foot windspan depiction of the national bird of the United States, placed at another San Antonio amusement park, Six Flags Fiesta Texas. Other Hinojosa sculptures are the Juan Seguin monument at Seguin Central Park in Seguin, Texas, the Knute Rockne and Ara Parseghian statues at Notre Dame University in South Bend, Indiana, and the life-size "Among Friends There Are No Borders" statue at Laredo International Airport, which depicts a South Texas vaquero and a Mexican charro sharing a campfire. Hinojosa's works appear in the collections of former U.S. President Richard M. Nixon and the late Governors Allan Shivers, Dolph Briscoe, and Bill Clements. The legislature recognized Hinojosa in 1982–1983 as the "Official State Artist."

Hinojosa also sculpted the bust of Charles Robert Borchers, the former district attorney of the 49th Judicial District Court, which is displayed on the main floor of the Webb County Justice Center in downtown Laredo.

== Educator ==
Hinojosa, who has worked with Stevens for several decades, is a graduate of the institution now known as Texas A&M University - Kingsville. He was a faculty member and the dean of visual arts at the Vidal M. Trevino School of Communications and Fine Arts in downtown Laredo, an entity of the Laredo Independent School District. He is a direct descendant of Don Thomas Sanchez, who founded Laredo in 1755. His father, Geronimo Hinojosa, was also a painter and sculptor. Hinojosa said that he "always knew that my life would revolve around the creation and the appreciation of the arts."

Hinojosa and his wife have three children, Dr. Armando Roberto Hinojosa (born 1969), an internist in Laredo; David Andrew Hinojosa, and Melissa Joy Hinojosa.

Armando Hinojosa Drive in south Laredo is named in his honor.
