= Henry Arthur McArdle =

Irish-American painter (1836–1908)

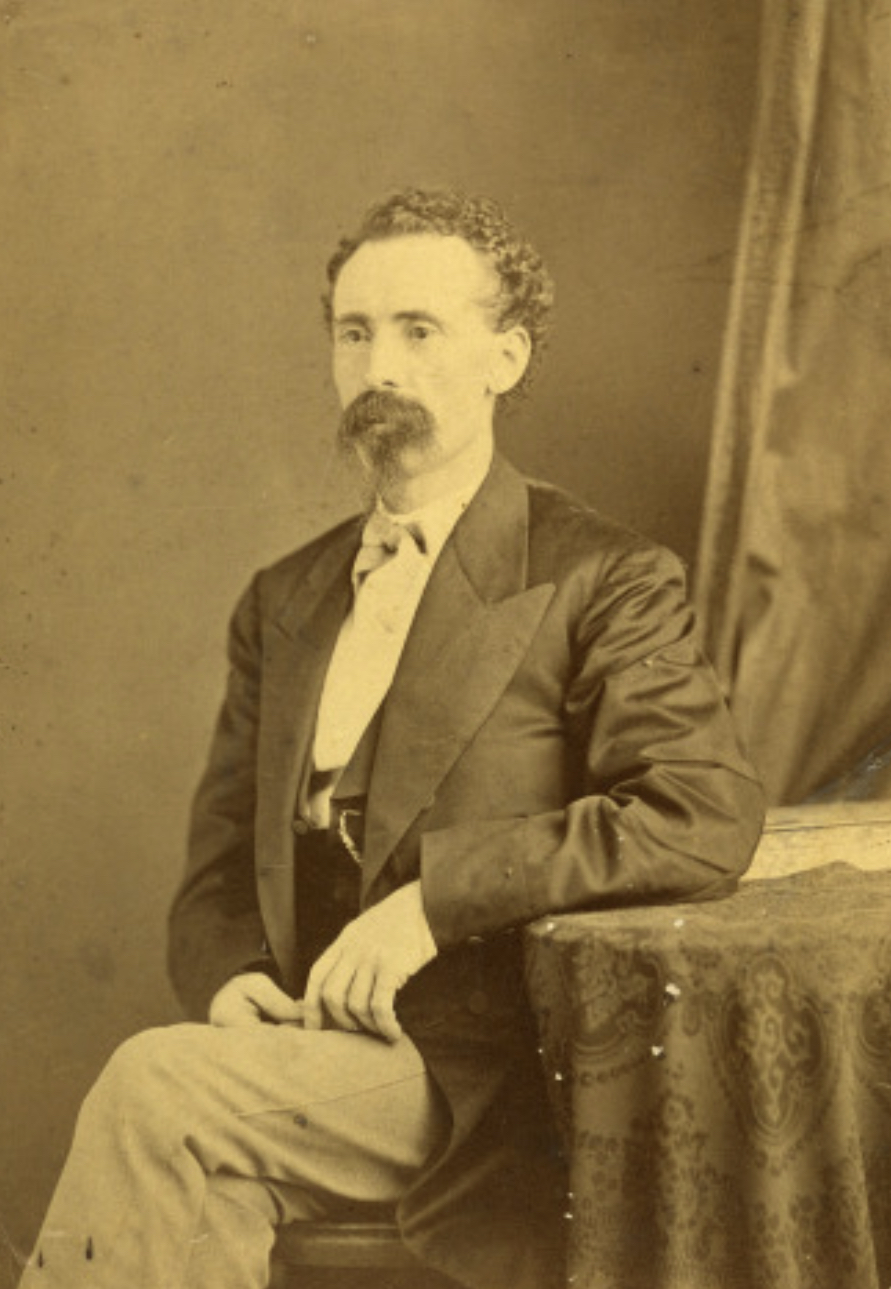
- Born: June 9, 1836; Belfast, Ireland
- Died: February 16, 1908 (aged 71); San Antonio, Texas
- Education: Maryland Institute College of Art
- Known for: Painting
- Spouses: Jennie Smith; Isophene Lacy Dunnington

Henry Arthur McArdle (June 9, 1836 – February 16, 1908) was an American painter of French and Irish descent. He was born in Belfast, Ireland on June 9, 1836, and immigrated as a teenager to the U.S. state of Maryland, where he studied at the Maryland Institute College of Art. During the American Civil War he was a cartographer in the service of Robert E. Lee. After the war he took a job at Baylor University and Baylor Female College and moved to Independence, Texas, where he was also known as Harry McArdle, with his new wife Jennie Smith.

After moving to Texas he interviewed members of Hood's Texas Brigade who fought with Robert E. Lee at the Battle of the Wilderness, as research for his painting titled Lee at the Wilderness. In 1890, Texas governor Lawrence Sullivan Ross commissioned him for a painting of Jefferson Davis to hang in the capitol building. McArdle moved to San Antonio and continued to paint many scenes of Texas history.

He is best known for his 1895 painting The Battle of San Jacinto, which depicts Sam Houston, and Dawn at the Alamo, depicting the final battle and first completed in 1875. The original painting hung in the Texas State Capitol building but was lost when a fire destroyed the building in 1881. He completed another version of the painting in 1905, which features Davy Crockett, James Bowie and William B. Travis. Both of the paintings were purchased from the family by the State of Texas after his death, and now hang in the Senate chamber of the Texas State Capitol.

Widowed in 1871, he married Isophene Lacy Dunnington. They had five children together. She died on June 18, 1907, and he died on February 16, 1908. They are buried together in City Cemetery #6 in San Antonio.

In January 2015, a collection of McArdle's journals, correspondence, painting aids and other materials was placed online by Baylor University's Digital Projects Group and The Texas Collection. The materials, which were drawn from Baylor University's holdings and McArdle's descendants, are available for research via the Baylor University Libraries Digital Collections.

== Gallery ==
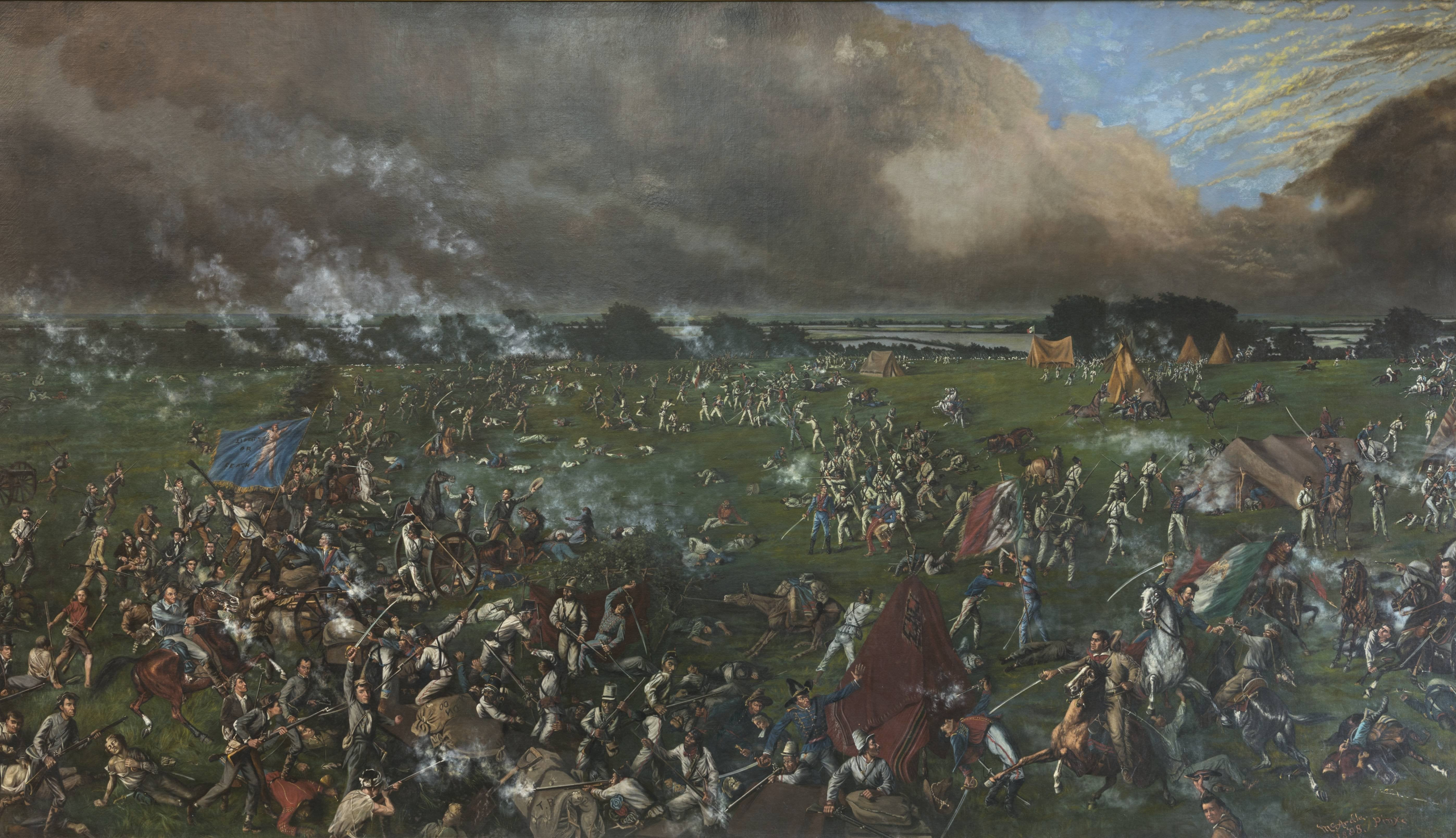
The Battle of San Jacinto, 1895

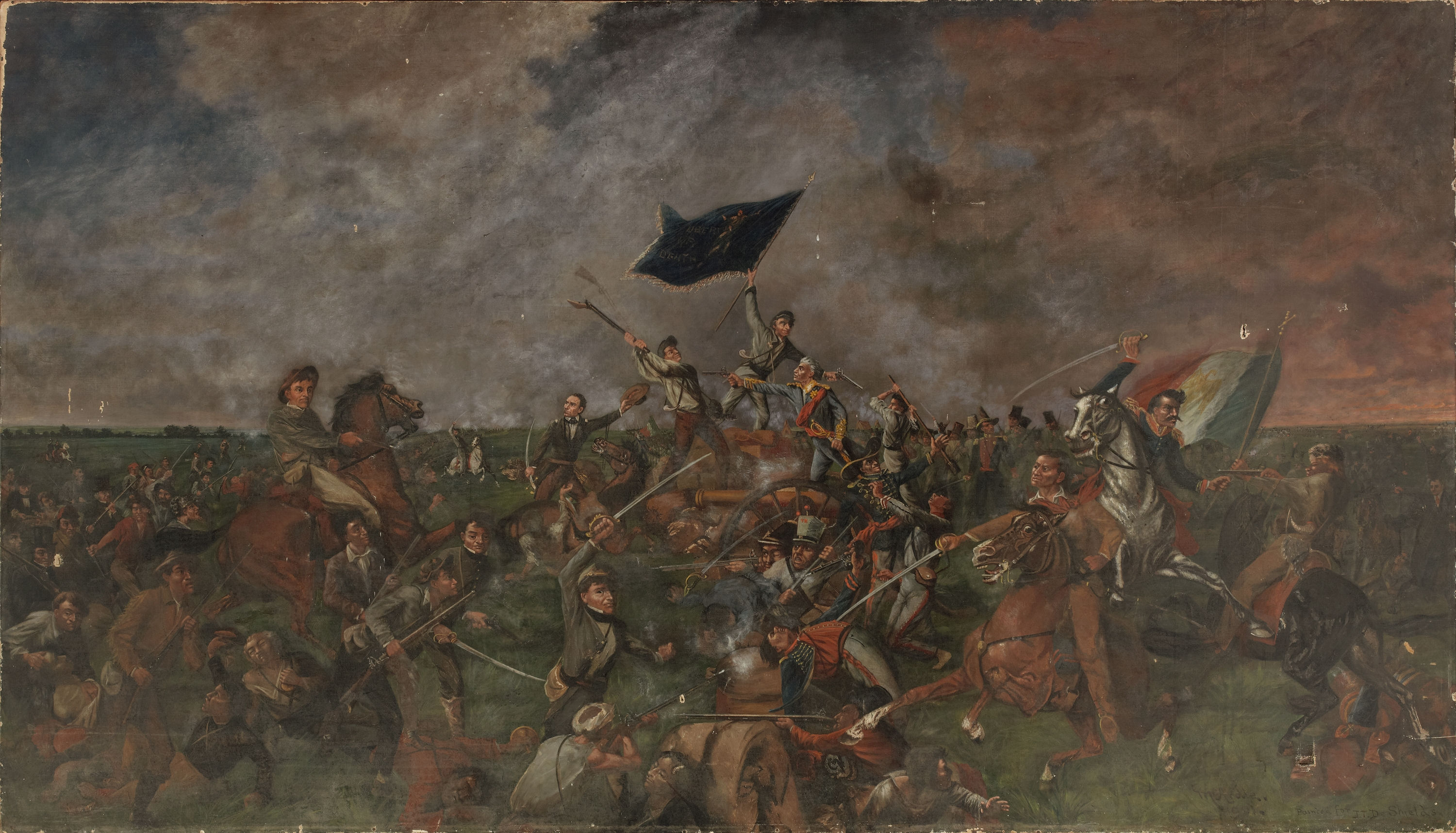
The Battle of San Jacinto, 1901

Dawn at the Alamo, 1905

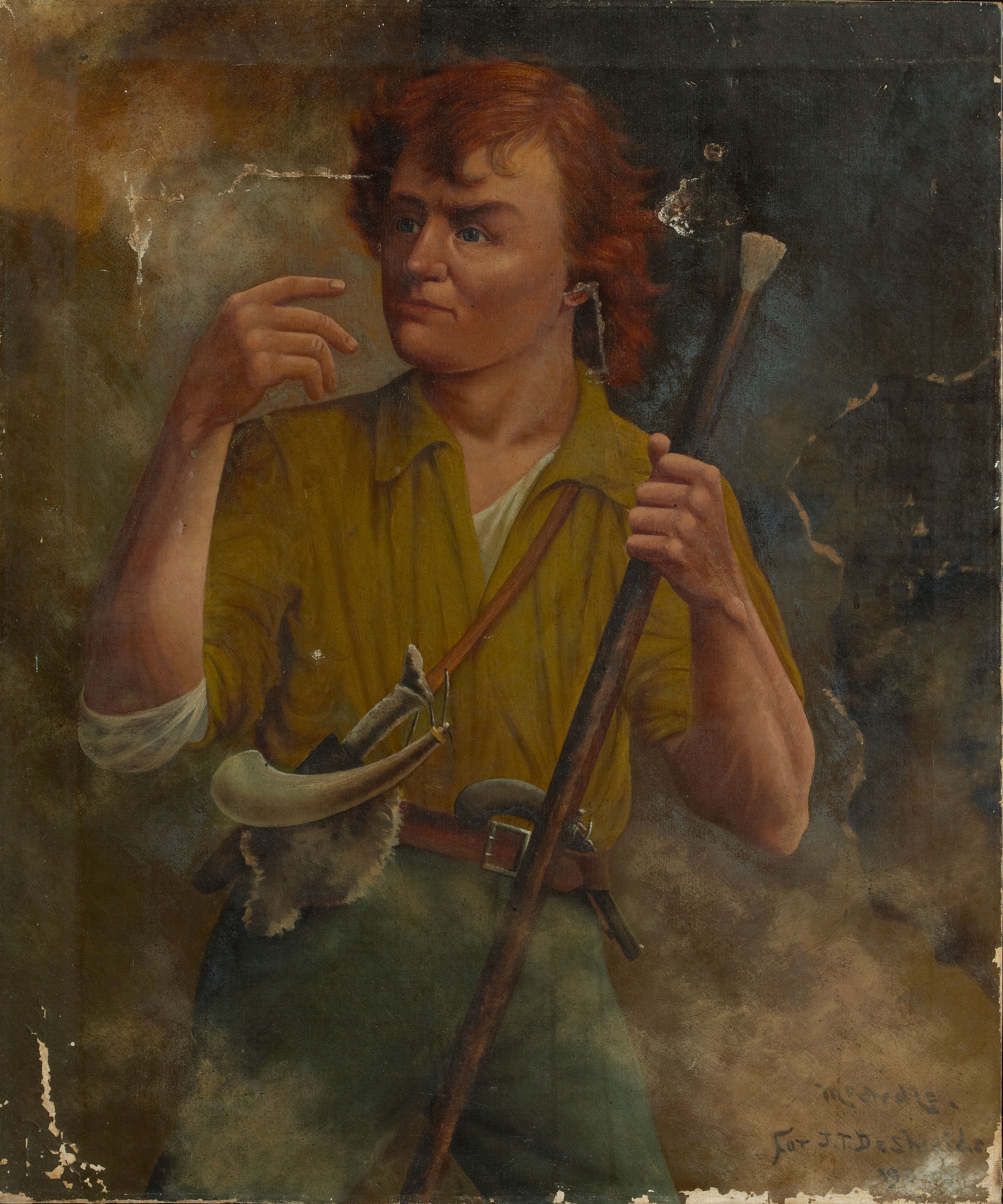
Portrait of Henry Karnes, 1905

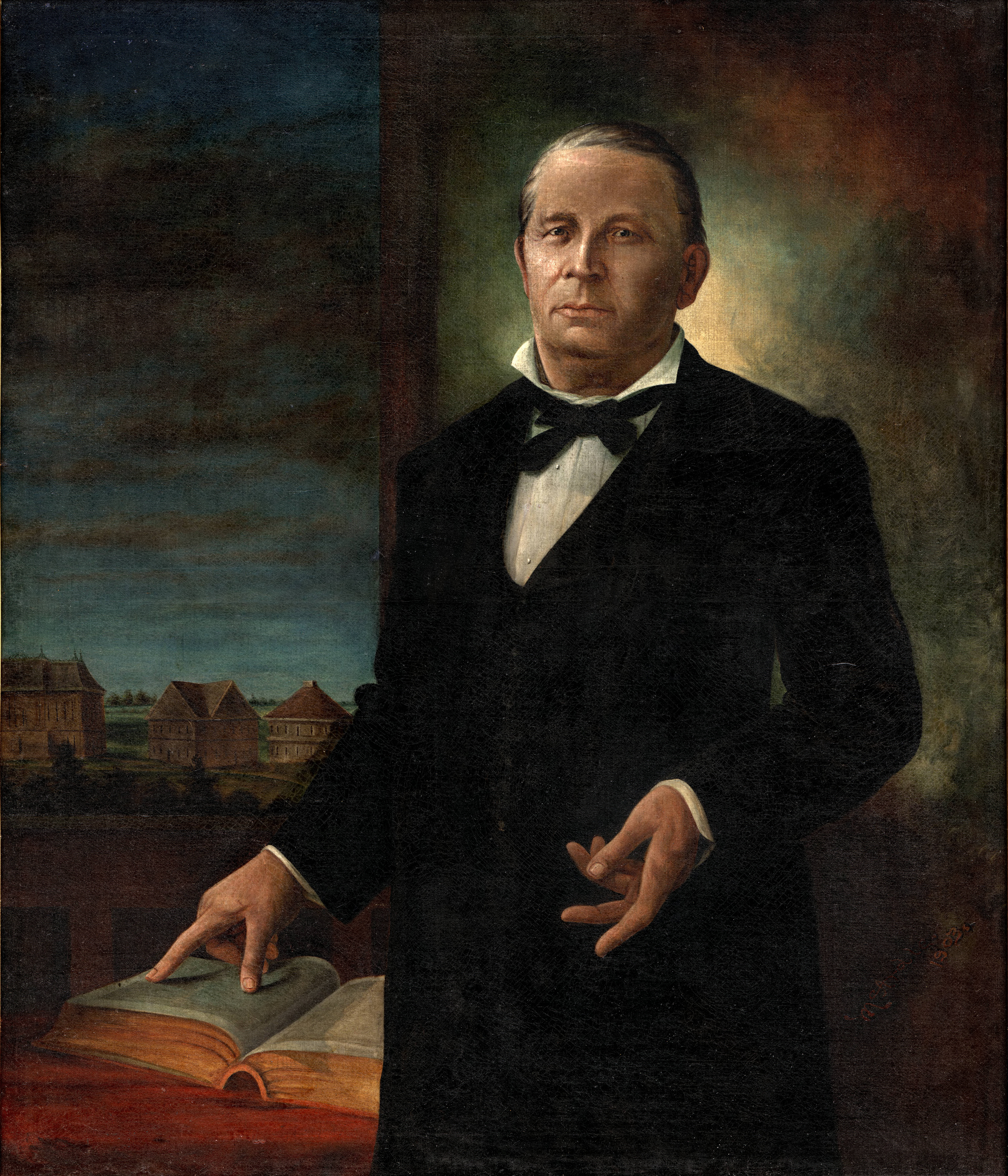
Portrait of William Carey Crane, 1903
