= Landmarks (The University of Texas at Austin) =

Landmarks is the public art program of The University of Texas at Austin. Its projects are exhibited throughout the university's 433-acre main campus.

== History ==
Landmarks grew out of a 2005 policy, Art in Public Spaces, that was approved by The University of Texas System Office of the General Counsel and the Executive Vice Chancellor for Academic Affairs. The policy set a goal of one to two percent of the capital cost of new construction and major renovations of main campus buildings for the acquisition of public art.

Following the adoption of the policy, Landmarks was established to develop a campus public art collection. Peter Walker Partners Landscape Architects created a Public Art Master Plan in 2007. This plan corresponds to the 1999 César Pelli Campus Master Plan and serves to guide overall public art acquisition and placement. Among many considerations, it proposes the best locations for installations of public art to provide visual anchors at gateways, to accentuate main axis corridors, and to clarify patchy architectural edges.

Landmarks was founded by Andrée Bober who leads the program as curator and director. At the official launch in 2008, The New York Times described Landmarks as "poised to become a destination for modern sculpture." The Metropolitan loan established an art historical foundation upon which the university would build its own collection.

== Artists in the Landmarks Collection ==
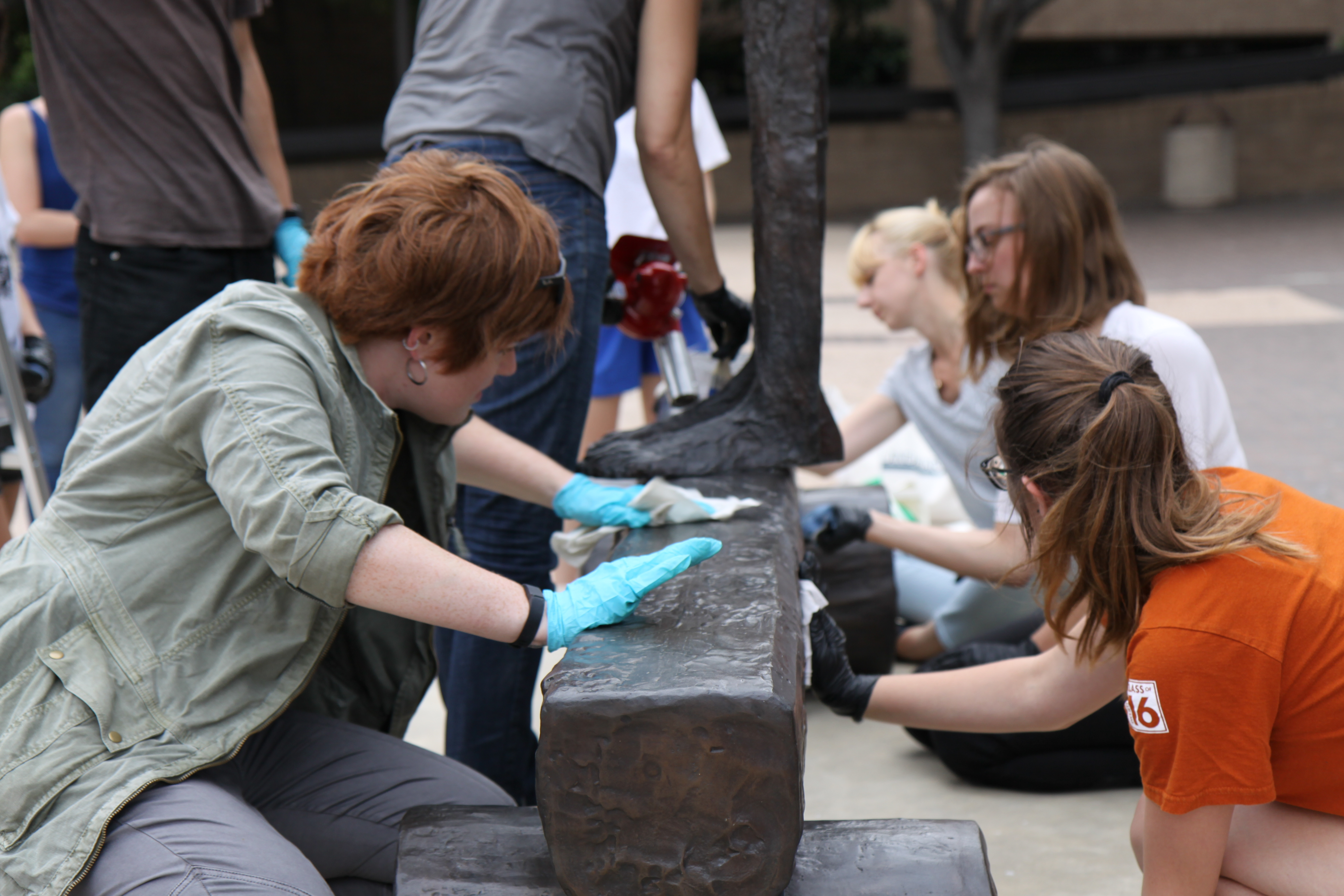
LPG volunteers clean Figure on a Trunk by Magdalena Abakanowicz

Commissioned artists include: Beth Campbell, Michael Ray Charles, David Ellis, Ann Hamilton, José Parlá, Casey Reas, Ben Rubin, Nancy Rubins, and James Turrell. Works have been acquired by Mark di Suvero, Sol LeWitt, and Marc Quinn. Artists in the Metropolitan Museum of Art long-term sculpture load include: Magdalena Abakanowicz, Willard Boepple, Louise Bourgeois, Deborah Butterfield, Beth Campbell, Anthony Caro, Koren Der Harootian, Jim Dine, Walter Dusenbery, Raoul Hague, Juan Hamilton, David Hare, Hans Hokanson, Bryan Hunt, Frederick Kiesler, Donald Lipski, Seymour Lipton, Bernard Meadows, Robert Murray, Eduardo Paolozzi, Beverly Pepper, Joel Perlman, Antoine Pevsner, Peter Reginato, Ben Rubin, Tony Smith, Ursula von Rydingsvard, and Anita Weschler.
