= Texas Commission on Law Enforcement =

Agency overview
- Formed: 1965
- Headquarters: 6330 East Highway 290; Suite 200; Austin, Texas 78723
- Employees: 75 (FY 2024)
- Agency executive: Greg Stevens, Executive Director
- Website: http://www.tcole.texas.gov/

The Texas Commission on Law Enforcement or TCOLE, serves as the regulatory agency for all peace officers in Texas, which includes sheriffs and their deputies, constables and their deputies, police officers, marshals, troopers, Texas Rangers, enforcement agents of the Alcoholic Beverage Commission, investigators of the Attorney General, and game wardens. County jailers and public security officers are also regulated by TCOLE.

With the passage of Senate Bill 686 in the 83rd Legislative Session, the commission's name was changed from "Texas Commission on Law Enforcement Officers Standards and Education" to "Texas Commission on Law Enforcement" on January 1, 2014.

== Overview ==
TCOLE operates under the authority granted by the Texas Legislature in Chapter 1701 of the Texas Occupations Code. Among its duties, TCOLE grants peace officer, county jailer, and public security officer licenses after minimum standards are met or suspends or revokes licenses for noncompliance, verifies that continuing education requirements are fulfilled, promulgates requirements for obtaining proficiency certificates, and regulates police academies.

TCOLE also employs investigators that are designated as peace officers to assist in the enforcement of Chapter 1701.

== Structure ==
The TCOLE Board of Commissioners formulates agency policies and makes recommendations to the Governor of Texas and the Legislature regarding related matters. Its nine members are appointed by the Governor and confirmed by the Texas Senate, to serve without pay for staggered, six-year terms. Three members must be sheriffs, constables, or chiefs of police. Three other members must be TCOLE licensees for at least five years (two of which must hold non-supervisory, peace officer positions). The last three members are chosen from the general population. The Board employs an Executive Director to lead the day-to-day operations of the agency.

TCOLE is divided into the following divisions:

- Credentialing Division
- Enforcement Division
- Special Services Division
- Field Services Division
- Legal Division
- Finance Division

== History ==
The impetus for the creation of TCLEOSE in 1965 was to improve law enforcement proficiency. By 1969, mandatory standards were promulgated for the employment of peace officers appointed after September 1, 1970. The first iteration of the standards for the Basic Peace Officer Course (BPOC) was issued in 1970, which called for a 140-hour minimum curriculum. In 1971, the appointment of trained reserve officers was authorized. Medical and psychological examinations were added for licensure in 1976. Continuing education was not required until 1983. The Texas Peace Officers' Memorial project was started in 1989 and the memorial was dedicated in 1999. In 2004, the current BPOC standards were implemented, which call for a minimum of 618 hours of instruction for new peace officer licenses.

The Texas Sunset Commission is charged with recommending if a public need exists for the continuation of each state agency or its advisory committees or for the performance of their functions. In 2008-2009, the Texas Sunset Commission reviewed TCLEOSE and the Legislature continued its existence until 2021.

== Awards ==
TCOLE recognizes licensees with awards for the following acts:

- Valor: exhibited an act of personal heroism or bravery which exceeds the normal expectations of job performance, such as placing one's own life in jeopardy to save another person's life, prevent serious bodily injury to another, or prevent the consequences of a criminal act.
- Public service: when an individual, through initiative, creates or participates in a program or system which has a significant positive impact on the general population of a community which would exceed the normal expectations of job performance.
- Professional achievement: when an individual, through personal initiative, fixity of purpose, persistence, or endeavor, creates a program or system which has a significant positive impact on the law enforcement profession which would exceed the normal expectations of job performance.
- Academic achievement: when a licensee graduates from an accredited college or university with an associate degree, bachelor's degree, master's degree, or doctorate and has at least two years of experience as a peace officer, reserve, jailer or telecommunicator.

== Certifications ==
TCOLE offers the following certifications:

For peace officers:

- Basic Peace Officer Proficiency Certification
- Intermediate Peace Officer Proficiency Certification
- Advanced Peace Officer Proficiency Certification
- Master Peace Officer Proficiency Certification

For jailers:

- Basic Jailer Proficiency Certification
- Intermediate Jailer Proficiency Certification
- Advanced Jailer Proficiency Certification
- Master Jailer Proficiency Certification

For telecommunicators (dispatchers):

- Basic Telecommunicator Proficiency Certification
- Intermediate Telecommunicator Proficiency Certification
- Advanced Telecommunicator Proficiency Certification
- Master Telecommunicator Proficiency Certification

Other:

- Civil Process Certification
- Court Security Specialist Certification
- Crime Prevention Specialist Certification
- Firearms Instructor Proficiency Certification
- Instructor Advanced Proficiency Certification
- Instructor Proficiency Certification
- Investigative Hypnosis Certification
- Mental Health Officer Certification
- SFST Instructor Certification
- School Based Law Enforcement Certification
- Sexual Assault/Family Violence Investigator Certification
- Cybercrime Investigator Certification

== Honoring the Fallen ==
TCOLE is responsible for raising money from private and public entities for the continued maintenance and update of the Texas Peace Officers' Memorial. TCLEOSE also provides Texas flags to the next of kin of deceased peace officers.

== See also ==
- Florida Criminal Justice Standards & Training Commission
