= The Yearling (sculpture) =

1993 sculpture by Donald Lipski

- Artist: Donald Lipski
- Location: Denver, Colorado, U.S.
- Coordinates: 39°44′16″N 104°59′18″W

The Yearling is a sculpture by American artist Donald Lipski, installed in Denver, Colorado, United States. It was created in 1993 and installed outside the Denver Central Library in 1998. and depicts a pony on a red chair. It is made of fiberglass and steel.

According to The New York Times, the work "comes ... with a deeply cockeyed vision that Denver has come to call its own in recent years as the art scene here has blossomed with a confidence that the cow town of Colorado’s past never knew". The newspaper said: "The sculpture, originally created for a New York City school site but acquired by Denver in 1998, is now seen by many residents and visitors as a perfect vision of the New West, or perhaps the Old West turned upside down more “Big Lebowski” than “Stagecoach” because of the pony's gasp-inducing shift of scale and context. He stands, proud and muscular and fully life-sized, atop a giant straight-back classroom chair: the wild young creature as schoolboy."
