= Donald Lipski =

American sculptor (born 1947)

- Born: 21 May 1947 (age 79); Chicago, Illinois
- Known for: sculpture, ceramics
- Awards: Scholastic Art Award; 1965; National Endowment for the Arts; 1978, 1984, 1990; Guggenheim Fellowship; 1988; Rome Prize; 2000
- Website: www.donaldlipski.net

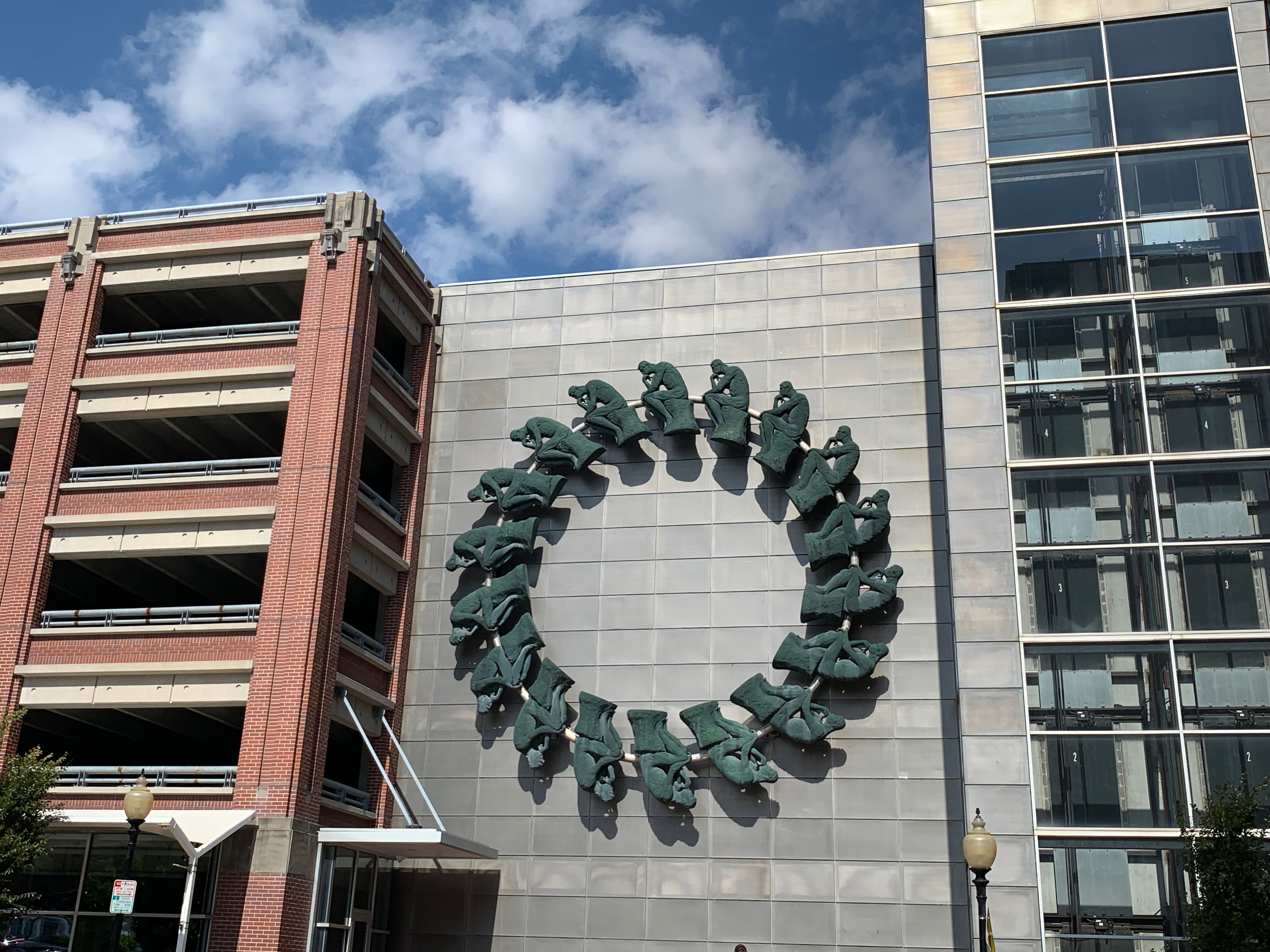
Rodin Rodanadana in Kansas City, MO

Donald Lipski (born May 21, 1947) is an American sculptor best known for his installation work and large-scale public works.

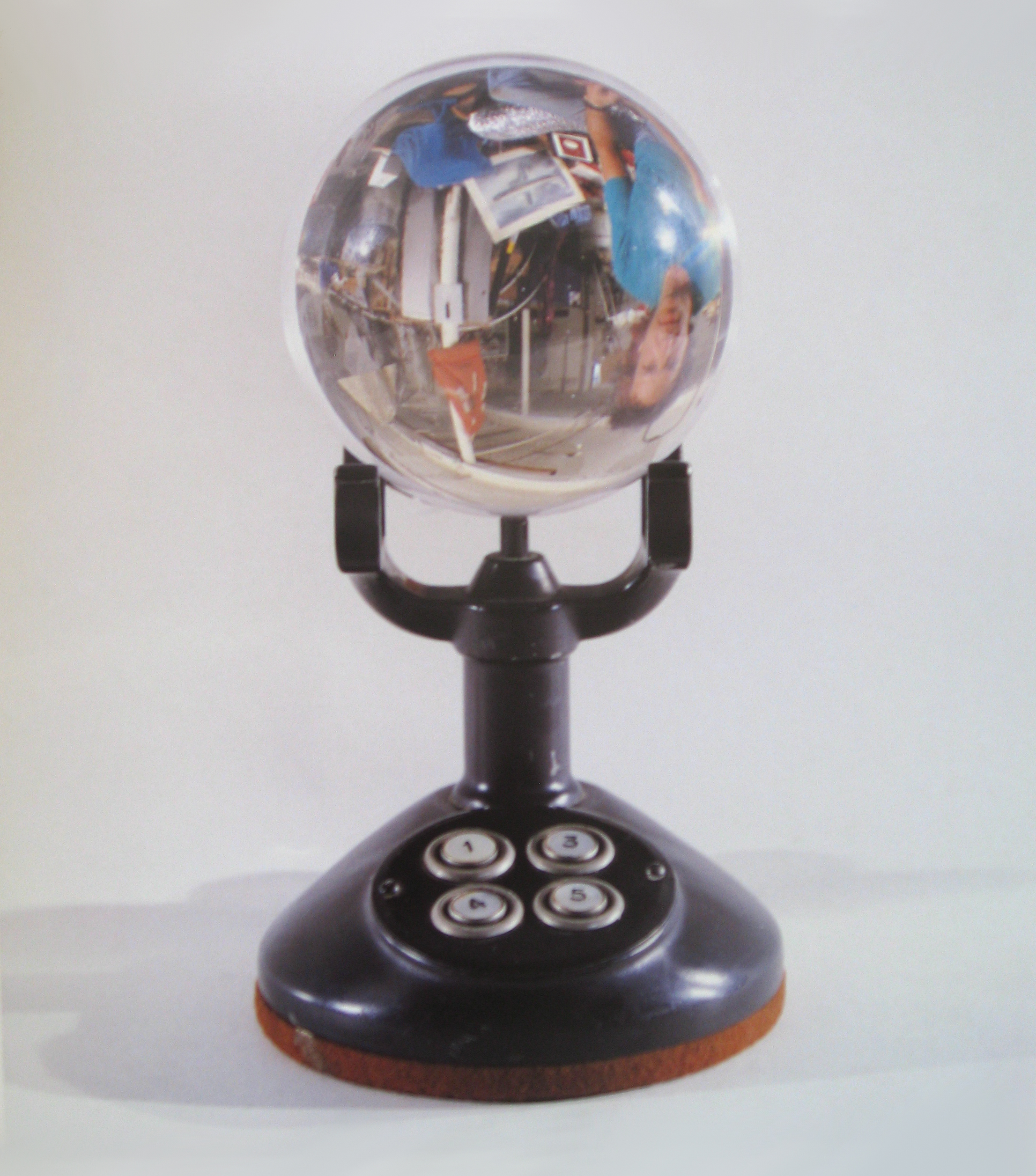
Building Steam No. 317, 1982–85, crystal ball and intercom. (Photo: Dorothy Zeidman)

== Early life and education ==
Donald Lipski was born in Chicago, Illinois in 1947. He was raised in the northern suburb of Highland Park, the son and grandson of bicycle dealers. Although his first welded sculptures as a teen won him The Scholastic Art Award in high school, he was a history major and anti-war activist at the University of Wisconsin–Madison, earning a B.A. in American History in 1970. In Madison, Lipski discovered ceramics while working with well-known ceramics artist Don Reitz. He then pursued an MFA in ceramics from Cranbrook Academy of Art in 1973, where he studied with Richard DeVore and Michael Hall. Lipski taught at the University of Oklahoma from 1973 to 1977, when he moved to New York.

Building Steam No. 386 (The Book of Knowledge), 1985. Collection: Yale University Art Gallery. (Photo: Dorothy Zeidman)

== Art career ==
Lipski attained growing recognition with his early installation Gathering Dust, which comprised thousands of tiny sculptures pinned to the wall, first at New York gallery Artists Space in 1978, and soon after in Museum of Modern Art as part of the Project series. In 1978 he won the first of three National Endowment for the Arts grants, followed by a Guggenheim Fellowship in 1988, an award from the American Academy of Arts and Letters in 1993, and the Rome Prize of The American Academy in Rome in 2000. He is permanently conserved in the New York Metropolitan Museum of Art, the Corcoran Gallery of Art in Washington, D.C., The Art Institute of Chicago, and dozens of other museums.

Lipski's installation works continued in the 1990s with The Bells, at the Contemporary Arts Center in Cincinnati, The Starry Night, at Capp Street Project, San Francisco, Pieces of String Too Short to Save, in the Grand Lobby of The Brooklyn Museum, NY), and The Cauldron at the Parrish Art Museum, Southampton, New York.

Partial view of SPOT!, a sculpture of a dalmatian and taxi in front of the Hassenfeld Children's Hospital.

In recent years, Lipski has focused his efforts on creating large-scale works for public spaces. Some of his most recognizable works include The Yearling, outside the Denver Public Library (originally exhibited by The Public Art Fund at Doris Freedman Plaza, Central Park, New York, 1997), Sirshasana, hanging in the Grand Central Market, Grand Central Terminal in New York City, and F.I.S.H. at the San Antonio River Walk, in Texas. There are twenty others across the U.S.

In 2012, Lipski was living and working in Philadelphia, Pennsylvania. He is represented by Galerie Lelong in New York.

== Public collections ==
- Asian American Art Center, New York
- Brooklyn Museum, New York, New York
- Chicago Art Institute
- Cincinnati Art Museum
- Corcoran Gallery of Art, Washington, D.C.
- Dayton Art Institute, Dayton, Ohio
- Denver Art Museum, Denver, Colorado
- Denver Public Library, Denver, Colorado
- Detroit Institute of Art, Detroit, Michigan
- Indianapolis Museum of Art, Indianapolis, Indiana
- Jewish Museum, New York, New York
- Kansas City Public Library's Plaza Branch, Kansas City, Missouri
- Landmarks (University of Texas at Austin), Austin, Texas
- Laumeier Sculpture Park, St. Louis, Missouri
- Miami Art Museum
- Menil Collection, Houston, Texas
- Metropolitan Museum of Art, New York, New York
- Minneapolis Museum of Fine Art, Minneapolis, Minnesota
- Museum of Contemporary Art, Chicago
- Museum of Contemporary Art, Los Angeles
- Museum of Fine Arts, Boston, Massachusetts
- Museum of Fine Arts, Houston, Texas
- Museum of Modern Art, Miami
- New Orleans Museum of Art, New Orleans, Louisiana
- North Carolina Museum of Art, Raleigh
- Raymond Nasher Sculpture Collection, Dallas, Texas
- Panza Collection, Italy
- Phoenix Museum of Art, Phoenix, Arizona
- Museum of Contemporary Art, San Diego, California
- Walker Art Center, Minneapolis, Minnesota
- Whitney Museum of American Art, New York, New York
- Witherspoon Museum of Art, Greensboro, NC
- Yale University Art Gallery

== Bibliography ==
- Donald Lipski, retrospective catalogue, The Bawag Foundation, Vienna, 1999-2000 (text David Levy Strauss).
- Arnason, H.H. History of Modern Art. 3rd ed. New York: Harry N. Abrams Inc, 1986.
- Bellamy, Peter. The Artist Project. New York: IN Publishing, 1991.
- Heartney, Eleanor, et al. The Refco Collection. Chicago: Refco Group Ltd, 1990.
- Pradel, Jean Louis, ed. World Art Trends 1983/84. New York: Harry N. Abrams Inc, 1984.
- King, Elain. "Donald Lipski" in Artists Observed. Edited by Harvey Sten. New York: Harry N. Abrams Inc, 1986, pp. 38–39.
- Fleischman, Stephen, and Terrie Sultan. Donald Lipski: A Brief History of Twine. Madison, WI: Madison Art Center, 2000.
- Richer, Francesca and Matthew Rosenzweig eds. No. 1: First Works by 362 Artists. New York: Distributed Art Publishers, 2005.
- Bloodworth, Sandra and William Ayres. Along the Way. New York: The Monacelli Press, 2006.

== Public commissions ==
Year	Item	Location
2021	He Kauhulu ʻAnae (A Gathering of Mullets)	Honolulu Authority for Rapid Transportation; City and County of Honolulu, HI
2018	The Canoes	Lesner Bridge, Virginia Beach, VA
2010	Psyche	Auraria Campus, Denver, CO
2010	Jackson	Regional Bus Terminal, Reno, NV
2009	The Ziz	Goodyear Ball Park, Goodyear, AZ
2009	F.I.S.H.	The River Walk, San Antonio, TX
2008	Cowcatcher	Regional Bus Terminal, Sparks, NV
2008	The Tent	Indianapolis, IN
2007	The Doors	City of Scottsdale, AZ
2007	Leaves of Grass	Levine Children's Hospital, Charlotte, NC
2006	The Lorelei Club	Minneapolis Central Library
2005	Nails' Tales	University of Wisconsin
2005	Intimate Apparel & Pearl Earrings	Fort Worth Convention Center
2005	Sylvia, Arthur	City of Chicago, IL
2004	Got Any Jacks?	Miami International Airport, FL
2003	Five Easy Pieces	Washington DC Convention Center
2001	Tools	Wellington Webb Municipal Building, Denver, CO
2000	Rodin Rodannadanna	Avenue of the Arts, Kansas City
2000	Sirshasana	Grand Central Market, Grand Central Terminal, NY
1997	The Yearling	Doris Friedman Plaza, Central Park, The Yearling now resides at the Denver Public Library
1997	The LaGuardia Suite	Concert Hall, La Guardia High School for Music
1987	The West	The University of Texas at Austin
