= F.I.S.H. =

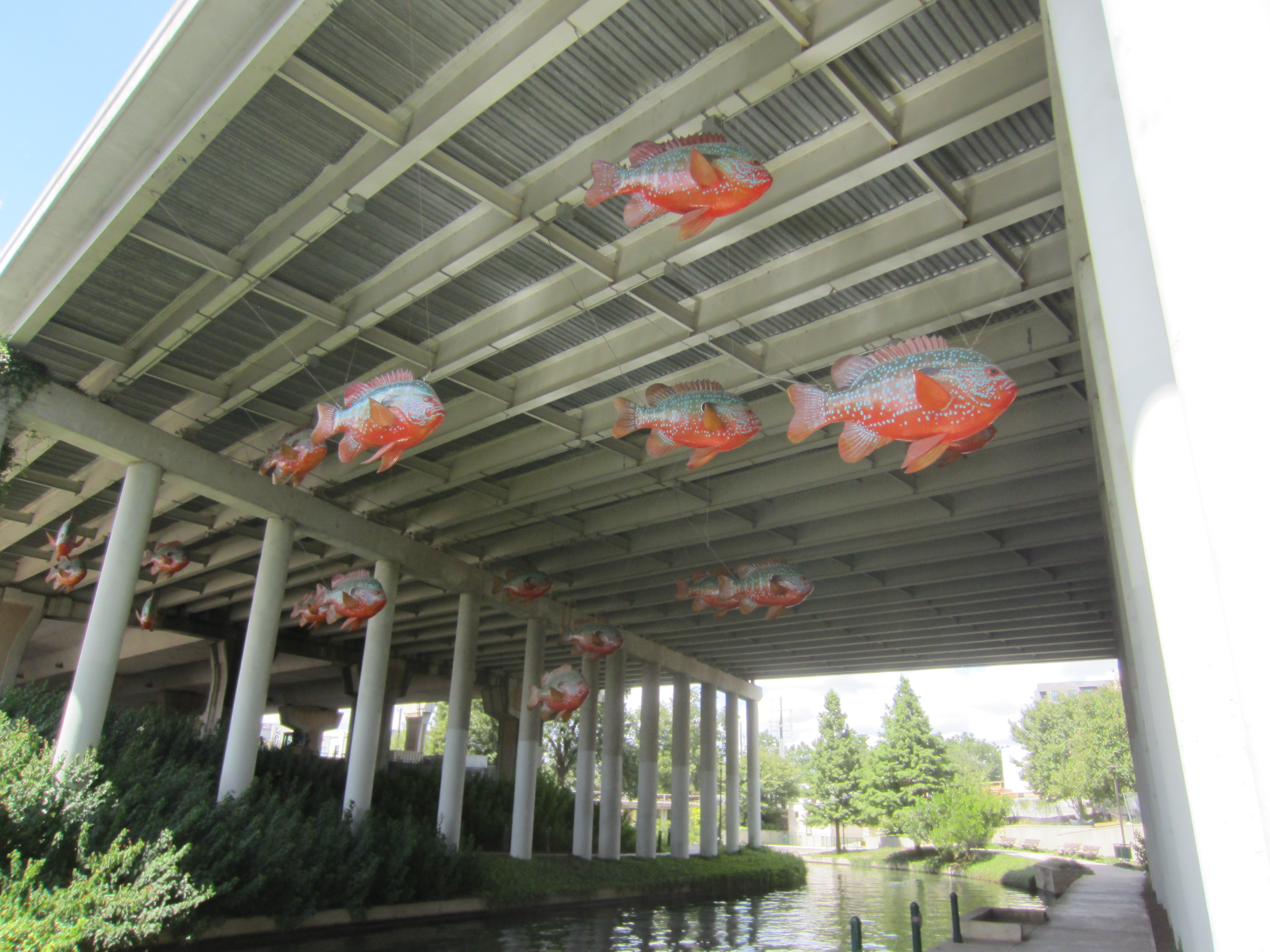
- The sculpture in 2018
- Artist: Donald Lipski
- Year: 2009
- Medium: Fiberglass resin sculpture
- Subject: Long-eared sunfish
- Location: San Antonio, Texas, U.S.
- 29°26′23″N 98°28′54″W

F.I.S.H. is an outdoor 2009 sculpture depicting a school of fish by Donald Lipski in San Antonio, Texas, United States. The installation is underneath the I-35 overpass over the San Antonio River near Camden Street. It features 25 7-foot (2.1 m) fiberglass resin sculptures of long-eared sunfish, each of which are hand-painted and anatomically correct. One additional fish is displayed inside The DoSeum, a children's museum. The sculpture is part of the collection of Public Art San Antonio.

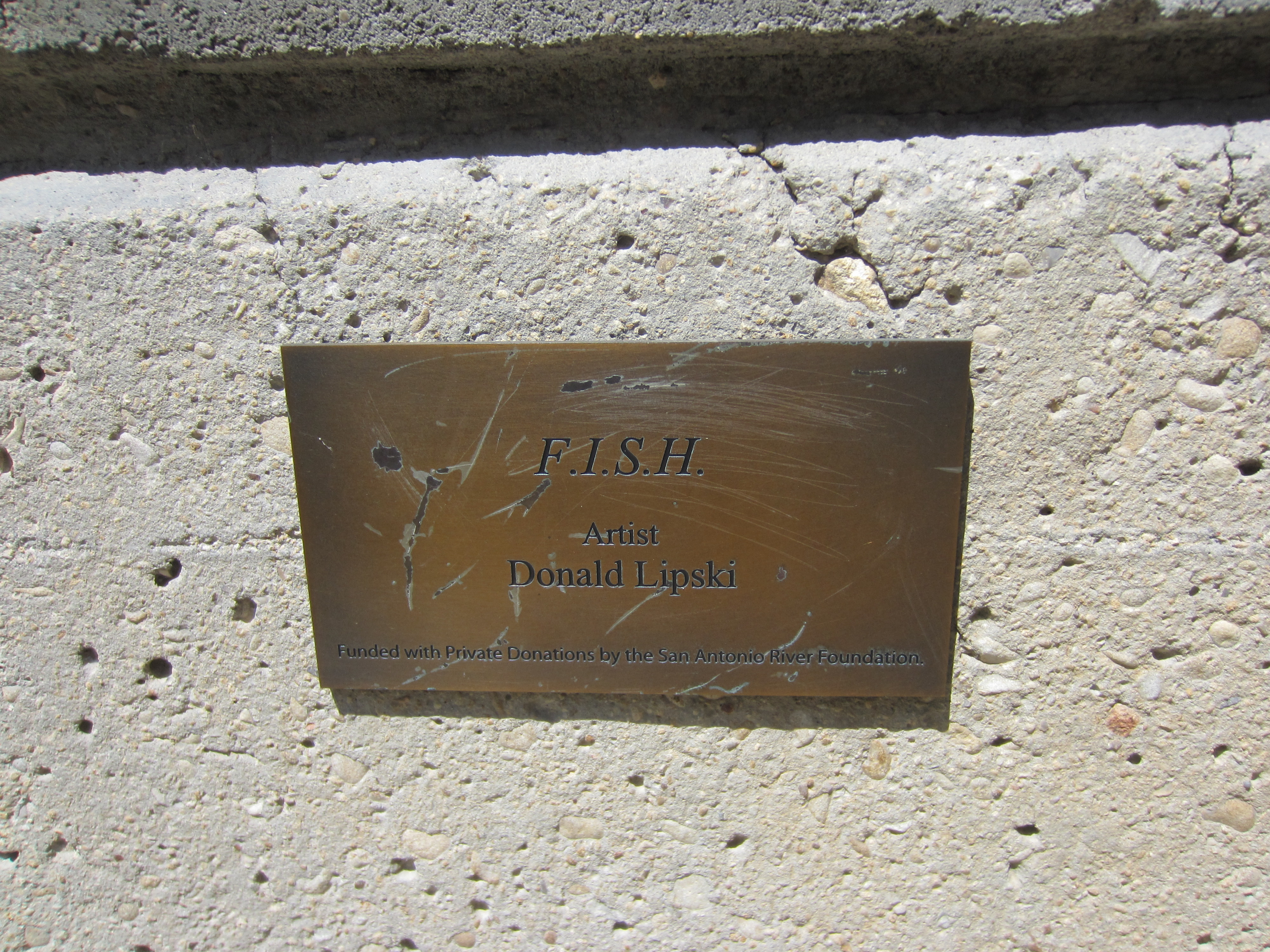
Plaque

== See also ==
- 2009 in art
