= Texas World War II Memorial =

War memorial in Austin, Texas, U.S.

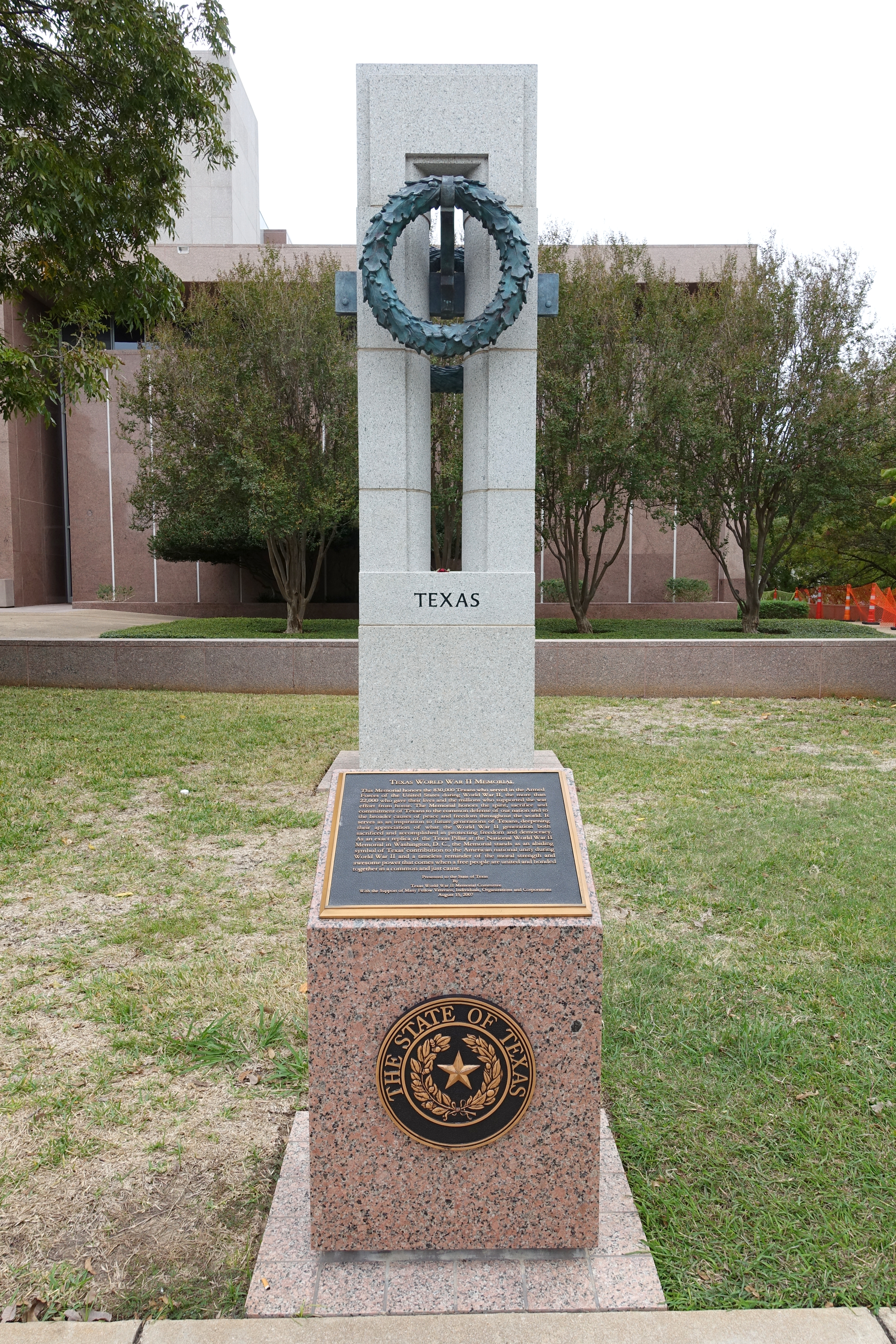
- The memorial in 2015
- Year: 2007
- Location: Austin, Texas, United States
- 30.275907°N 97.740703°W

The Texas World War II Memorial is an outdoor monument commemorating the more than 20,000 Texans who died in service during World War II, installed on the Texas State Capitol grounds in Austin, Texas, United States.

== Description and history ==
The memorial, a replica of the state's pillar at the National World War II Memorial in Washington, D.C., was by designed by an unknown artist and erected by the Texas World War II Memorial Committee and Texas State Preservation Board in 2007. It features a 17-foot (5.2 m) granite column with a bronze oak and wheat wreath.

== See also ==
- 2007 in art
