= Tejano Monument =

Monument in Austin, Texas, U.S.

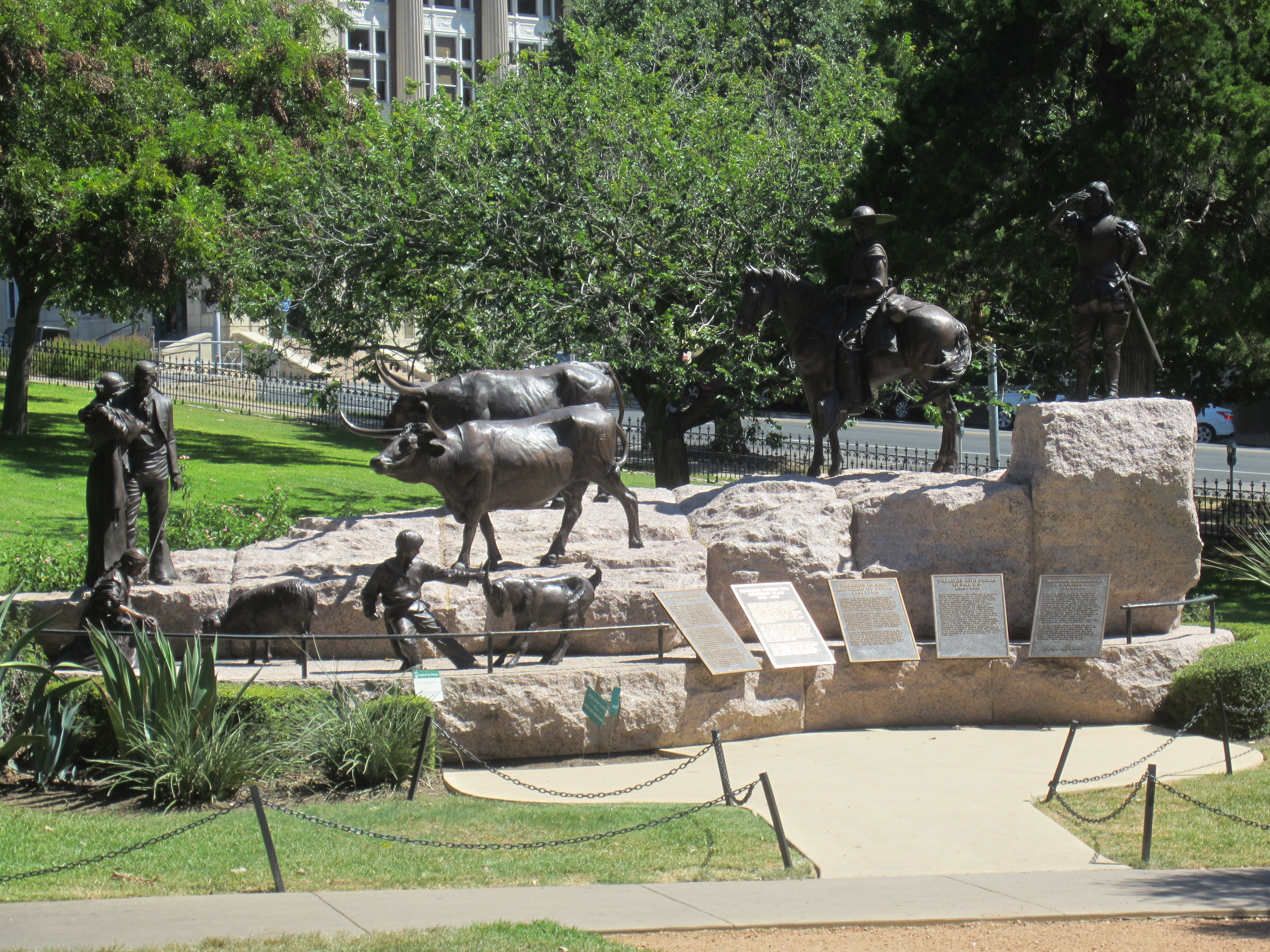
- The monument in 2018
- Interactive map of Tejano Monument
- Location: Austin, Texas, United States
- Coordinates: 30.272972°N 97.740296°W

The Tejano Monument is a memorial commemorating the impact of Tejanos on Texas culture and history, installed on the Texas State Capitol grounds in Austin, Texas, United States. The monument was sculpted by Armando Hinojosa and erected by Tejano Monument, Inc. in 2012. It features nine life-size bronze statues on a 275-ton Texas Sunset Red Granite base, and five plaques describing Tejano history.

== See also ==
- 2012 in art
