= Veterans of the 36th Infantry, Texas National Guard Monument =

Monument in Austin, Texas, U.S.

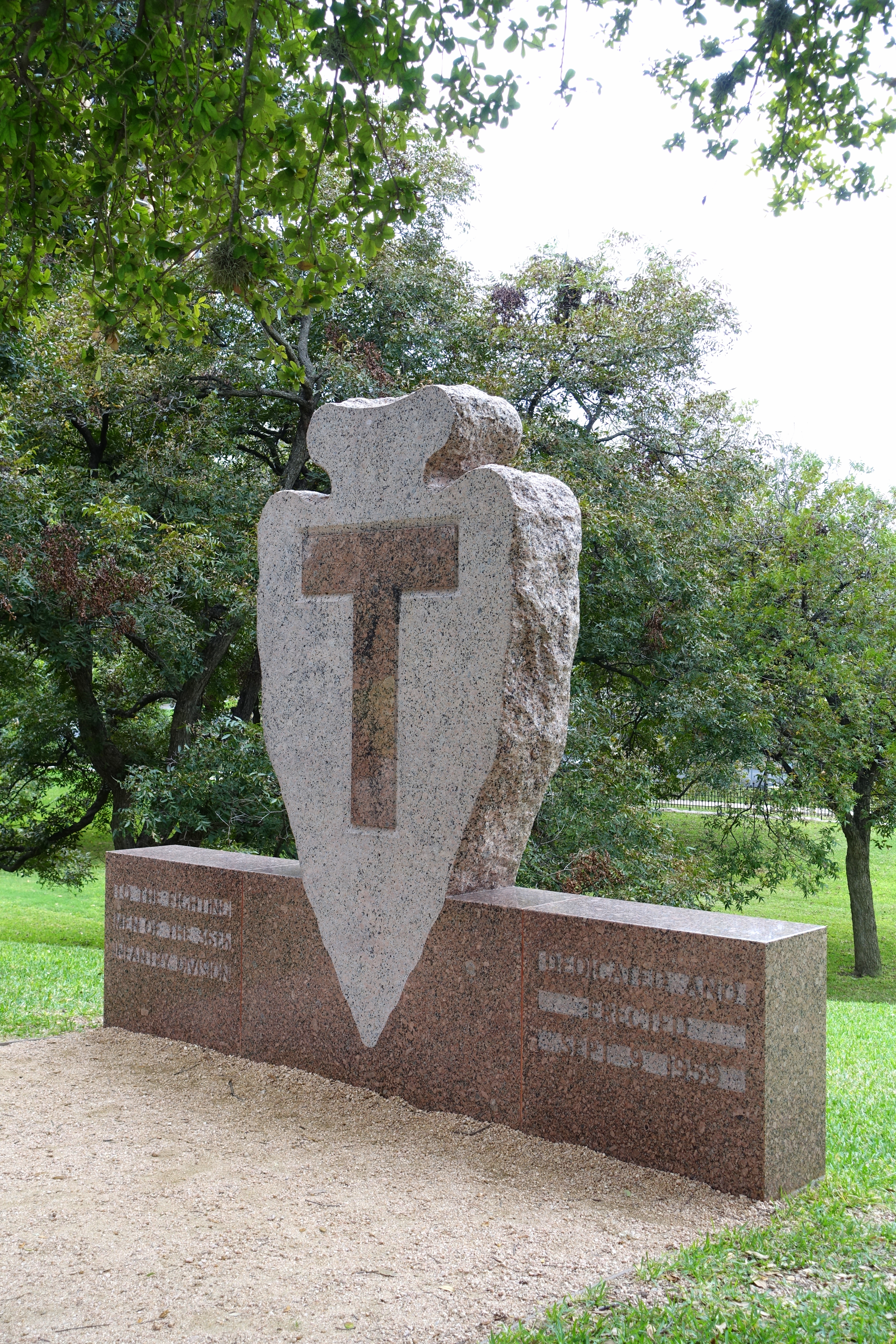
- The memorial in 2015
- Year: 1959
- Medium: Granite sculpture
- Location: Austin, Texas, United States
- 30°16′30.1″N 97°44′29.5″W

The Veterans of the 36th Infantry, Texas National Guard Monument is an outdoor memorial commemorating soldiers of the 36th Infantry, Texas National Guard, installed on the Texas State Capitol grounds in Austin, Texas, United States. The monument, designed by an unknown artist, was erected in 1959. It is made of Texas Sunset Red Granite and features the unit's "T-Patch" shoulder insignia.

== See also ==
- 1959 in art
