= Disabled American Veterans of Texas Monument =

Monument in Austin, Texas, U.S.

- United States
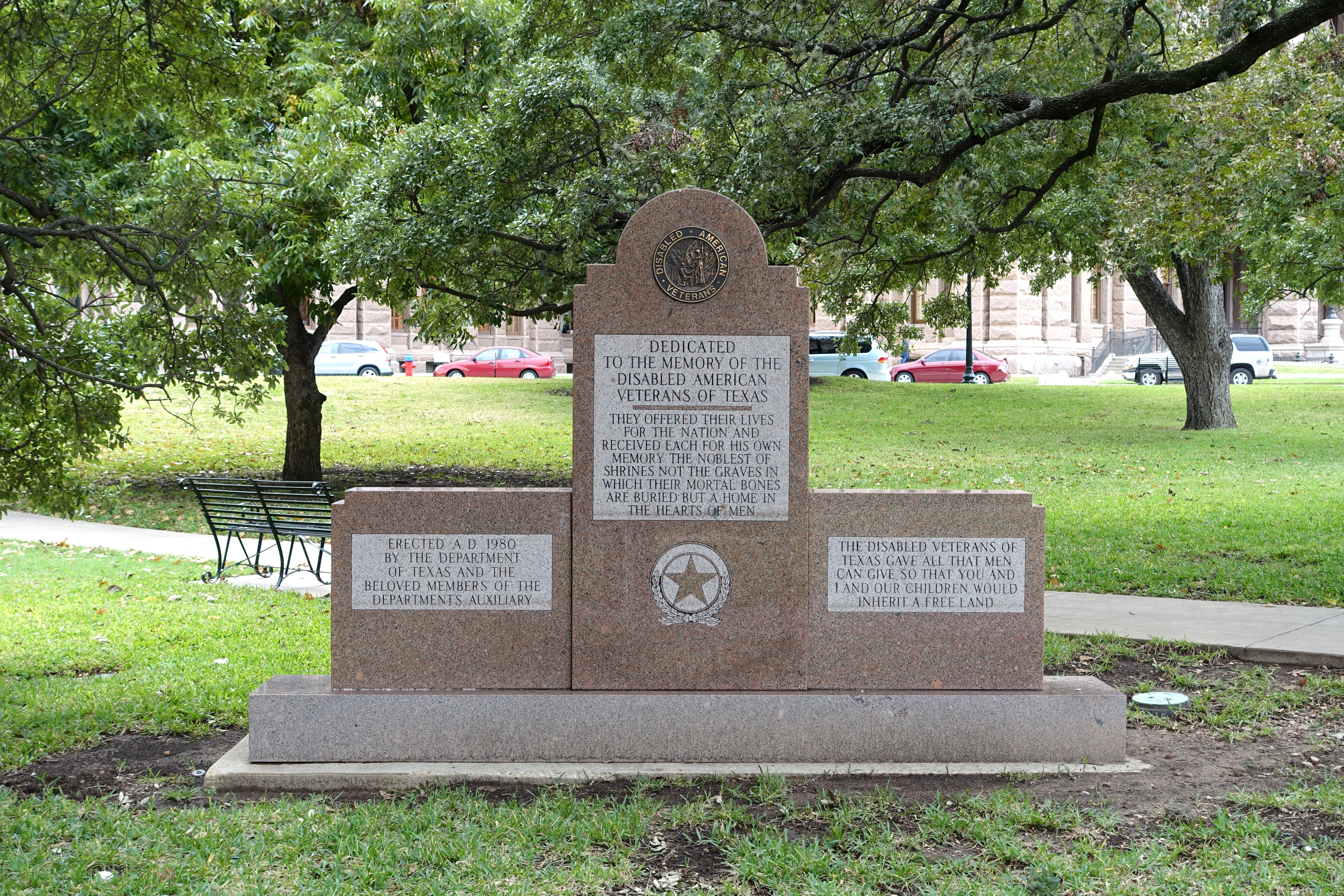
- The monument in 2015
- For Texan veterans who were disabled while serving in the United States military services
- Established: 1980
- Location: 30°16′31″N 97°44′21.6″W; Texas State Capitol, Austin, Texas, U.S.

The Disabled American Veterans of Texas Monument is an outdoor memorial commemorating Texan veterans who were disabled while serving in the United States military services, installed on the Texas State Capitol grounds in Austin, Texas, in 1980. The monument's base is made from Texas Sunset Red Granite, and features inscriptions and the bronze seal of the Disabled American Veterans.

== See also ==
- 1980 in art
- American Veterans Disabled for Life Memorial
