= World War I Monument (Austin, Texas) =

War memorial in Austin, Texas, U.S.

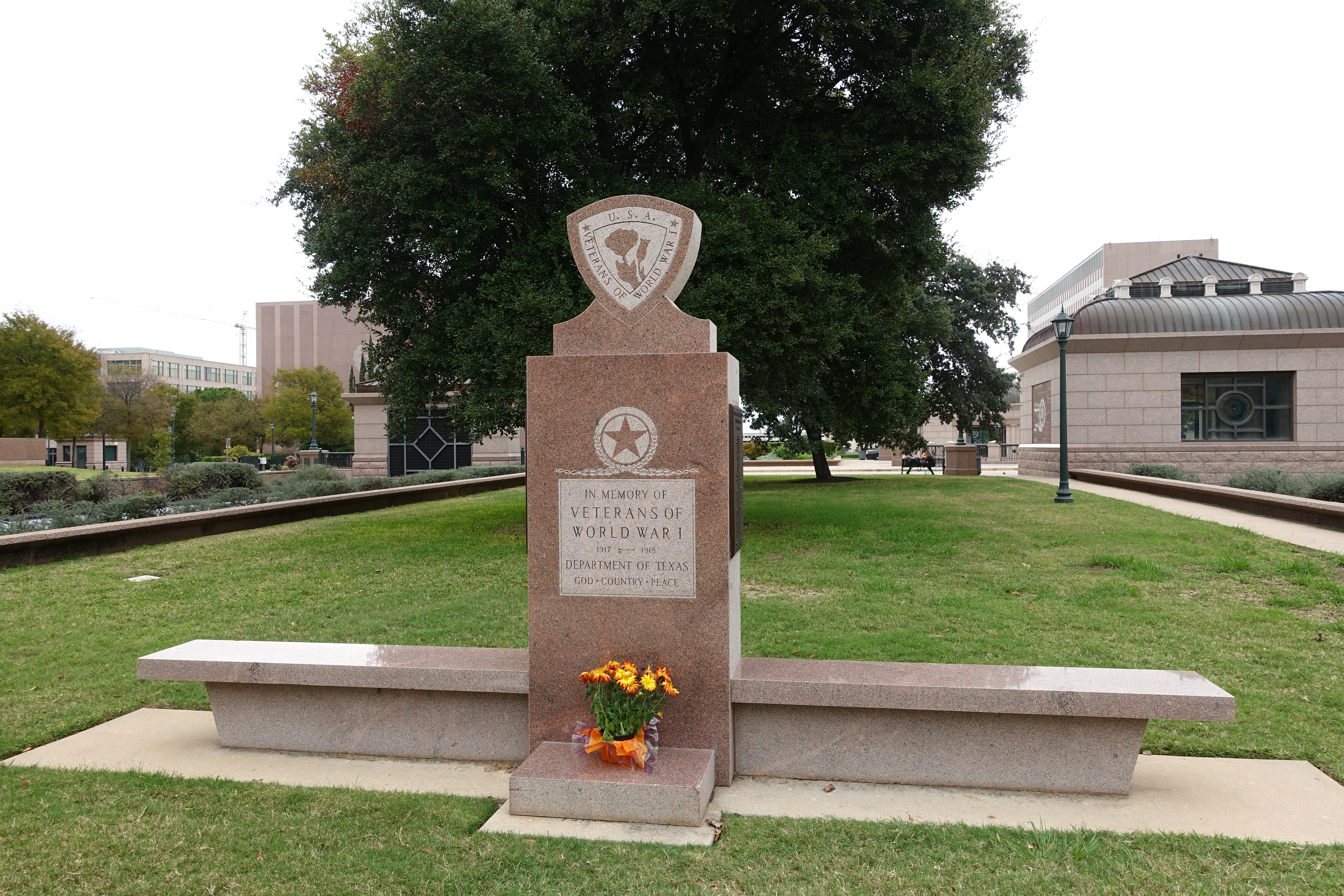
- The memorial in 2015
- Year: 1961
- Medium: Granite sculpture
- Location: Austin, Texas, United States
- 30.276197°N 97.740482°W

The World War I Monument is an outdoor memorial commemorating veterans of World War I (including nearly 200,000 Texans), installed on the Texas State Capitol grounds in Austin, Texas, United States. The Texas Sunset Red Granite monument was erected by members of the Department of Texas, Veterans of Foreign Wars in 1961. The artist, whose name is engraved at the base of the monument, is Joe Machac. It lists the barracks and auxiliaries that worked to create the memorial.

== See also ==
- 1961 in art
