= Square Tilt =

Sculpture in Austin, Texas, U.S.

- Artist: Joel Perlman
- Year: 1983
- Medium: Steel sculpture
- Location: Austin, Texas, United States
- 30°16′59.3″N 97°44′16.6″W

Square Tilt is an outdoor 1983 steel sculpture by American artist Joel Perlman, installed on the University of Texas at Austin campus in Austin, Texas, United States. The work is owned by the Metropolitan Museum of Art. The Metropolitan Museum of Art also has a maquette for Square Tilt in its collection.

== See also ==
- 1983 in art
