= Tribute to Texas Children Monument =

Sculpture in Austin, Texas, U.S.

- Artist: Lawrence Ludtke
- Year: 1998
- Medium: Bronze sculpture
- Location: Austin, Texas, United States
- 30.275492°N 97.740485°W

The Tribute to Texas Children Monument is an outdoor memorial commemorating children of Texas, installed on the Texas State Capitol grounds in Austin, Texas, United States. The monument was sculpted by Lawrence Ludtke, funded by students from 600 schools across the state, and erected in 1998. It features bronze statues of children on a field trip to the Capitol.

== See also ==
- 1998 in art
