= Gates-Dell Complex =

Computer Science department at the University of Texas at Austin

Gates Dell Complex
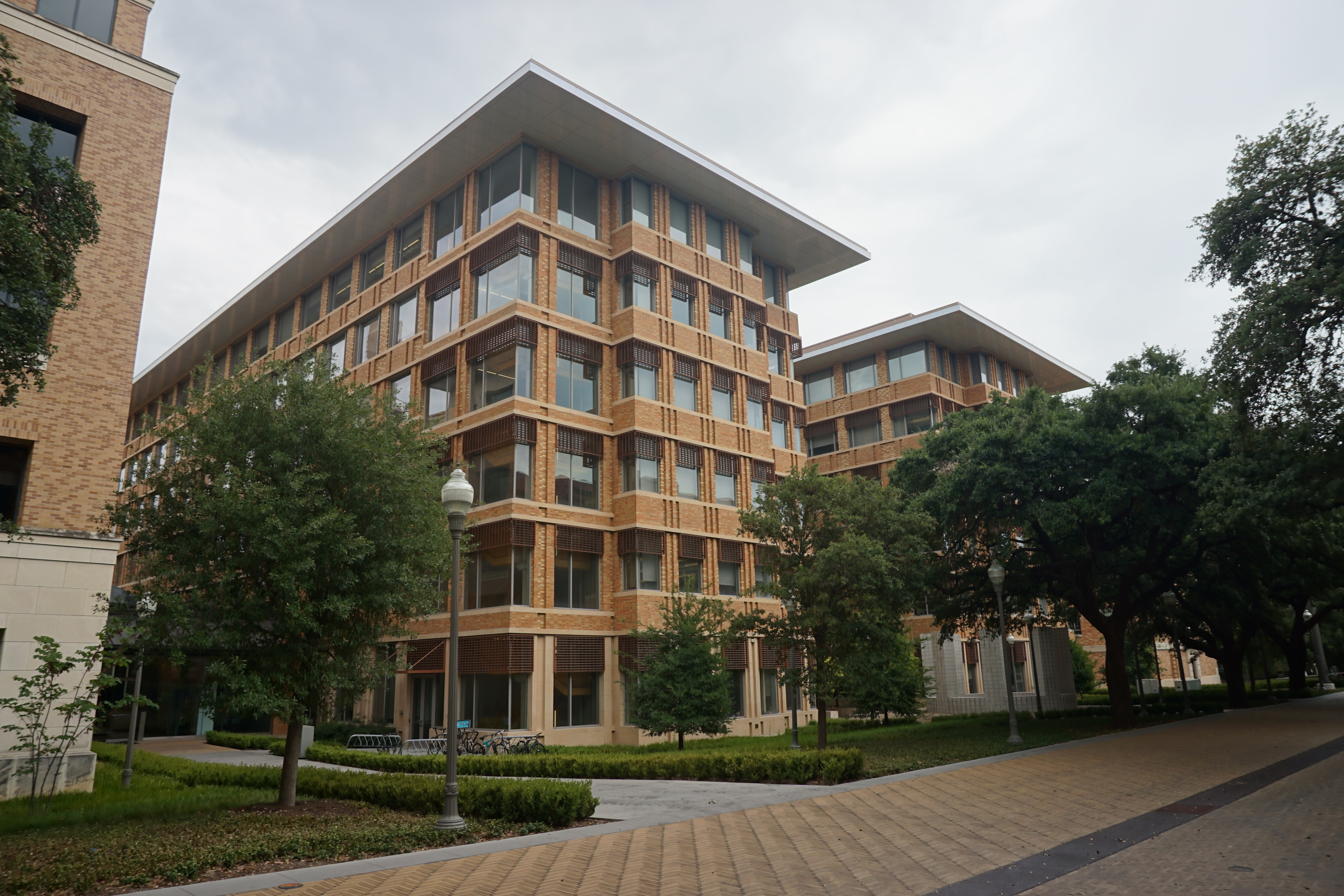
- Front of the GDC seen from Speedway
- Interactive map of the Gates Dell Complex area
- Alternative names: GDC

General information
- Architectural style: Spanish Mediterranean
- Location: 2317 Speedway, Austin, Texas, United States
- Coordinates: 30°17′11″N 97°44′12″W
- Groundbreaking: October 29, 2010
- Completed: December 2012
- Inaugurated: 2013
- Cost: US$120,000,000
- Owner: University of Texas at Austin

Technical details
- Floor count: 7
- Floor area: 239,778 sq ft (22,276.1 m^{2})

Design and construction
- Architect: Rustam Mehta
- Architecture firm: Pelli Clarke & Partners
- Structural engineer: Datum Engineering
- Civil engineer: Guerra Engineering
- Other designers: Coleman & Associates (landscape)

Website
- Official website

The Gates-Dell Complex (Bill and Melinda Gates Computer Science Complex and Dell Hall, abbreviated to GDC) is a building that houses the Computer Science department at the University of Texas at Austin. It was designed by Pelli Clarke Pelli, and completed in 2013 at a cost of $120 million. The building is named after Bill and Melinda Gates, and Susan and Michael Dell, who donated $30 million and $10 million, respectively, to the construction of the building.

The complex is organized into a north building and a south building, connected by a large glass atrium and a series of bridges. It is located at 2317 Speedway, Austin, TX - 78712.

== History ==
In 2013, the complex was officially opened during a ribbon-cutting ceremony attended by notable figures including Bill Gates, former CEO of Microsoft, and representatives of the Dell family. Gates praised UT for its exceptional computer science program and its efforts to diversify the field by reaching out to Hispanic students and women. During his visit, Gates addressed UT computer science students, expressing his admiration for their opportunities in the rapidly evolving field and encouraging them to pursue ambitious goals.
