= Beth Campbell (artist) =

American artist

Beth Campbell (born 1971 in Illinois, United States) is an American artist who works in drawing, sculpture, and installation.

== Education ==
She graduated from Truman State University with a BFA in 1993, and from Ohio University with an MFA in 1997.

== Career ==
Her works have been collected by The Museum of Modern Art, New York; New School University, New York; New Museum of Contemporary Art, New York; and the Whitney Museum of American Art, New York.

Campbell was the recipient of a Guggenheim Fellowship in 2011.

She currently lives and works in Brooklyn, NY.

== Exhibitions ==
2017

- "If (at all) possible", Kate Werble Gallery, New York, NY
- "Beth Campbell: My Potential Future Past", The Aldrich Contemporary Art Museum, Ridgefield, CT

2014

- Anne Mosseri-Marlio Galerie, Basel, Switzerland
- "My Potential Futures", Project Space, Joseé Bienvenu Gallery, New York, NY

2012

- "Stereotable", Kate Werble Gallery, NY

2010

- "New Installation", The Sculpture Center, Cleveland, OH

2009

- "Without Ends", Country Club Los Angeles
- "James Harris Gallery", Seattle, WA

2008

- Nicole Klagsbrun Gallery, New York, NY
- "Social Interactions (Two-person exhibition with Stephen Willats)", Seiler + Mosseri-Marlio, Zurich, Switzerland

2007

- "Following Room", Anne & Joel Ehrenkranz Lobby Gallery, Whitney Museum of American Art, New York, NY
- "I can't quite place it", Feldman Gallery + Project Space, Pacific Northwest College of Art, Portland, OR
- "Potential Store Fronts", 125 Maiden Lane storefront, New York, NY, a project of the Public Art Fund program in the Public Realm

2005

- "How Did We End Up Here?", Nicole Klagsbrun Gallery, New York
- "Make Belief", Sala Diaz, San Antonio, TX

2004

- "Statements", Art Basel, Miami Beach, FL
- "I was thinking (a living room)", Nicole Klagsbrun Gallery, New York, NY
- "Every other day", Art Academy of Cincinnati, OH

2003

- "Same As Me", Sandroni Rey Gallery, Los Angeles, CA

2002

- "Same As Me", Roebling Hall, Brooklyn, NY

== Reviews ==
- Jerry Saltz (October 8, 2002). "Repeat Performance". The Village Voice. Archived from the original on September 21, 2008.
- Don Shillingburg (Summer 2005). "Beth Campbell". BOMB 92.
- "Beth Campbell – the return of the mob". Arts Journal. May 22, 2009. Archived from the original on February 9, 2011.
