= Dawn at the Alamo =

1905 painting by Henry Arthur McArdle

- Artist: Henry Arthur McArdle
- Dimensions: 210 cm × 400 cm (84 in × 156 in)
- Location: Austin, Texas, United States

Dawn at the Alamo is a 1905 painting by Henry Arthur McArdle, displayed in the Texas State Capitol's Senate Chamber, in Austin, Texas, United States. The artwork has received some negative criticism by scholars for depicting David Crockett and William B. Travis with "an angelic glow amid dark imagery".

McArdle painted two versions of Dawn at the Alamo 25 years apart, with the 1881 version destroyed in a fire at the Texas state Capitol. The picture is considered one of McArdle's two masterpieces, with the other being The Battle of San Jacinto, completed in 1898.

== See also ==
- 1905 in art
