= Pearl Harbor Monument =

Monument in Austin, Texas, U.S.

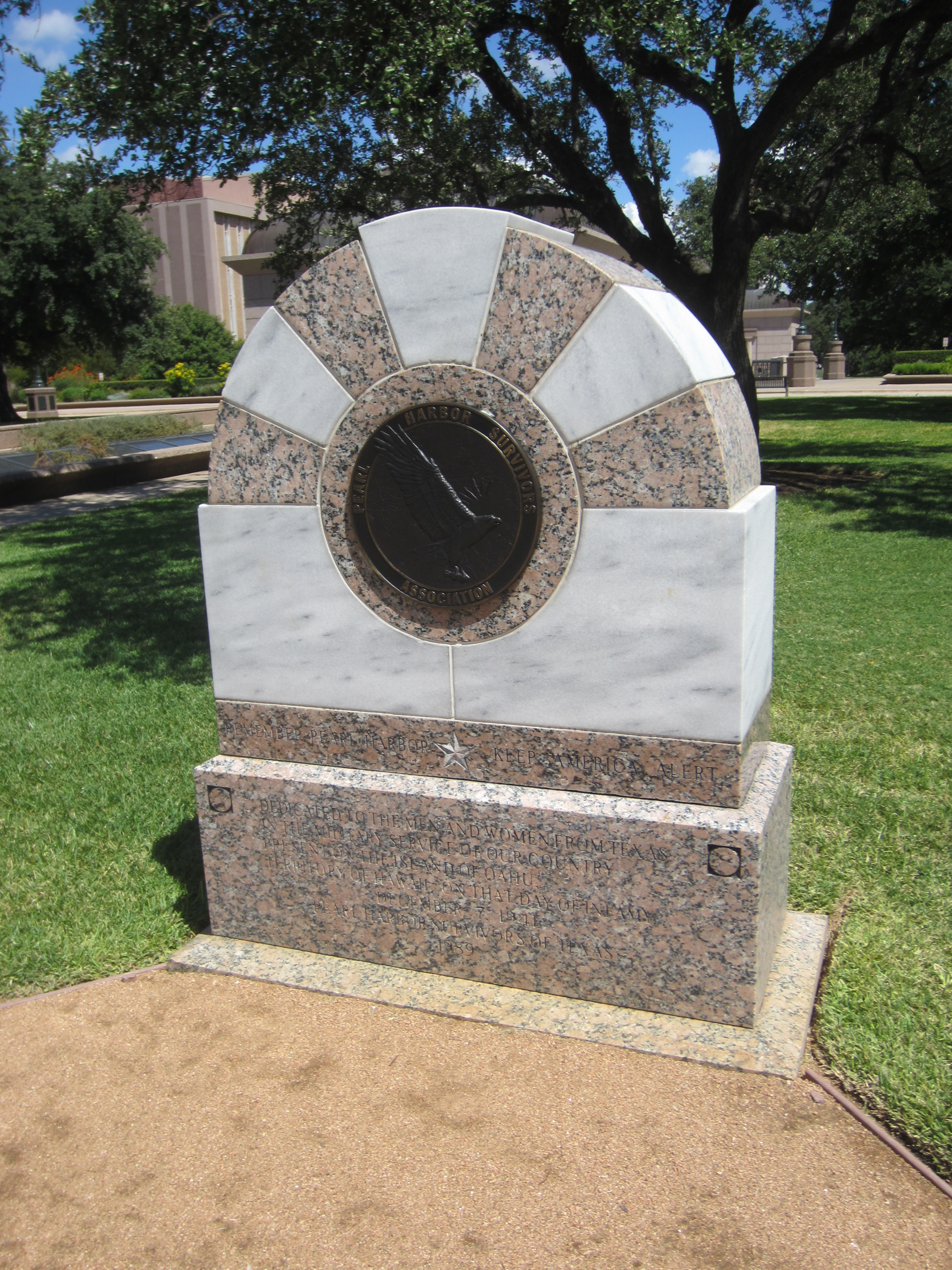
- The monument in 2018
- Interactive map of Pearl Harbor Monument
- Location: Austin, Texas, United States
- Coordinates: 30.275946°N 97.740576°W

The Pearl Harbor Monument is a memorial commemorating Texans enrolled in the military during the attack on Pearl Harbor on December 7, 1941, installed on the Texas State Capitol grounds in Austin, Texas, United States. The Texas Sunset Red Granite and marble monument was designed by Scott Field and erected by the Pearl Harbor Survivors of Texas in 1989. It features inscriptions and the bronze seal of the Pearl Harbor Survivors Association.

== See also ==
- 1989 in art
