= Texas Pioneer Woman Monument =

Memorial in Austin, Texas, U.S.

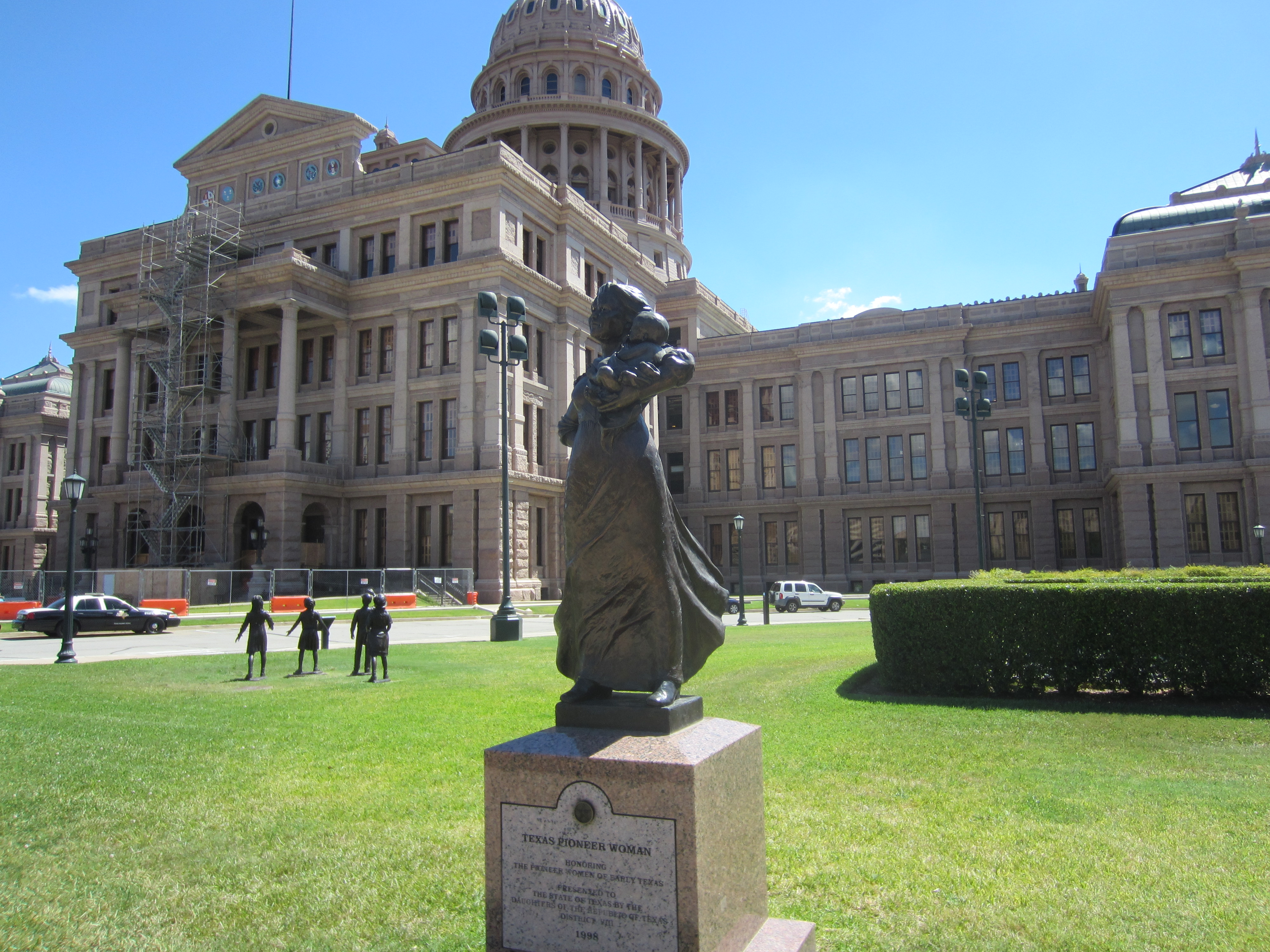
- The monument in 2018
- Artist: Linda Sioux Henley
- Year: 1998
- Medium: Bronze sculpture
- Location: Austin, Texas, United States
- 30.27559°N 97.740555°W

The Texas Pioneer Woman Monument is an outdoor memorial commemorating the pioneer women of Texas, installed on the Texas State Capitol grounds in Austin, Texas, United States. The monument was sculpted by Linda Sioux Henley and erected by the Daughters of the Republic of Texas, District VIII, in 1998. It features a bronze statue of a pioneer mother and her baby on a Texas Sunset Red Granite pedestal.

== See also ==
- 1998 in art
