= Texas Peace Officers' Memorial =

Memorial in Austin, Texas, U.S.

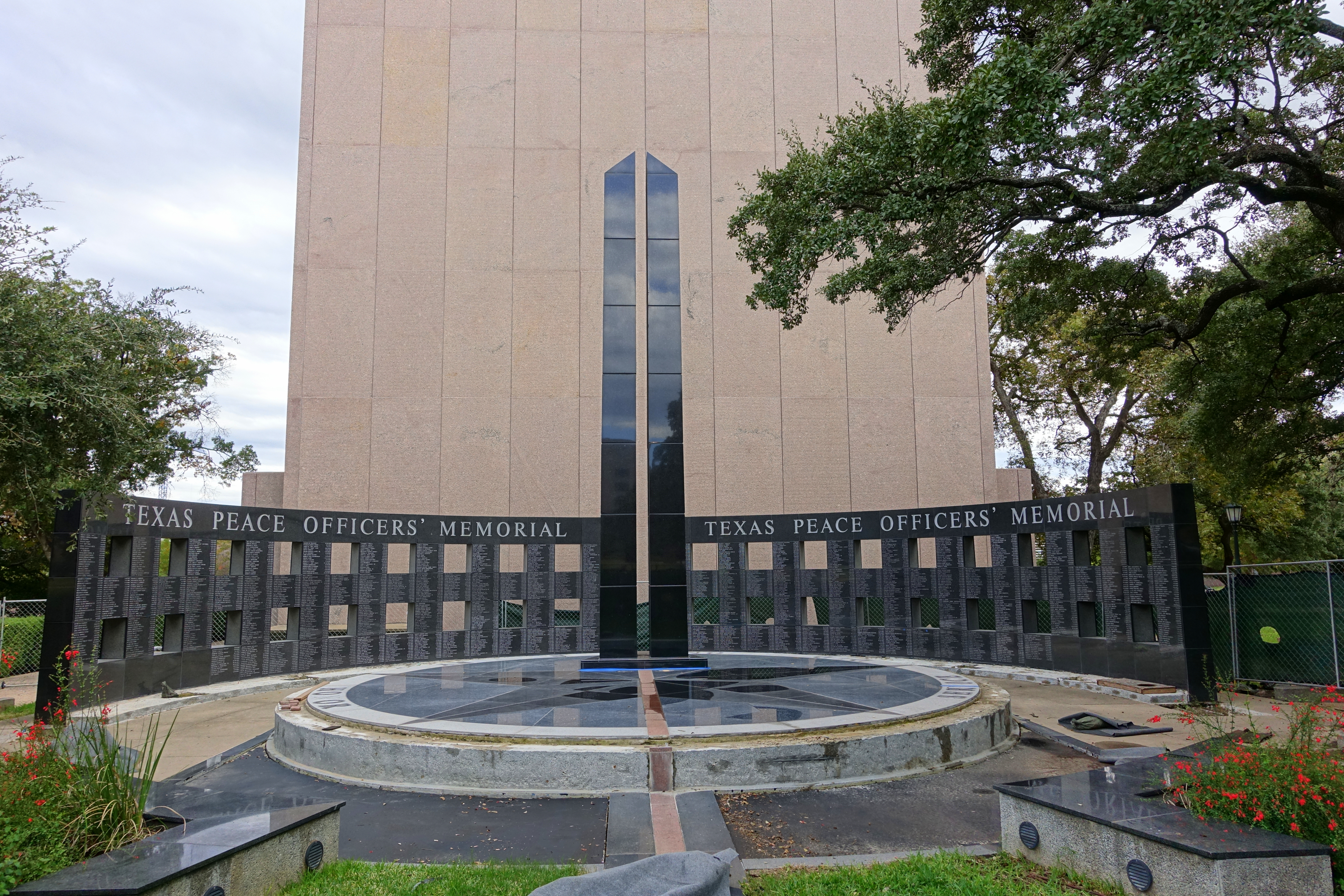
- The memorial in 2015
- Artist: Linda Johnson
- Year: 1999
- Location: Austin, Texas, United States
- 30.275256°N 97.739046°W

The Texas Peace Officers' Memorial is an outdoor monument commemorating law enforcement and corrections officers who died in service since August 5, 1823, installed on the Texas State Capitol grounds in Austin, Texas, United States. The memorial was designed by Linda Johnson and erected by the Texas Commission on Law Enforcement and Texas State Preservation Board in 1999. It features two granite spires placed next to each other to look like an obelisk, set on a base with a Texas Lone Star, as well as inscribed names along granite walls of those who died since Stephen F. Austin commissioned the Texas Peace Officers, or the Texas Ranger Division.

Originally, the names were added as they were found or determined to be eligible. Since 2017, TPOMC (Texas Peace Officers Memorial Committee) coordinators have been listing new names on each panel chronologically from 1-19. Recently and since the front wall is full, TPOMC coordinators have begun to remove and replace panels. Older, more historic names are being transferred to the back portion of the memorial. There is an ongoing effort to replace rear panels newest to oldest chronologically.

== See also ==
- 1999 in art
