= The Battle of San Jacinto (McArdle) =

Two paintings by Henry Arthur McArdle

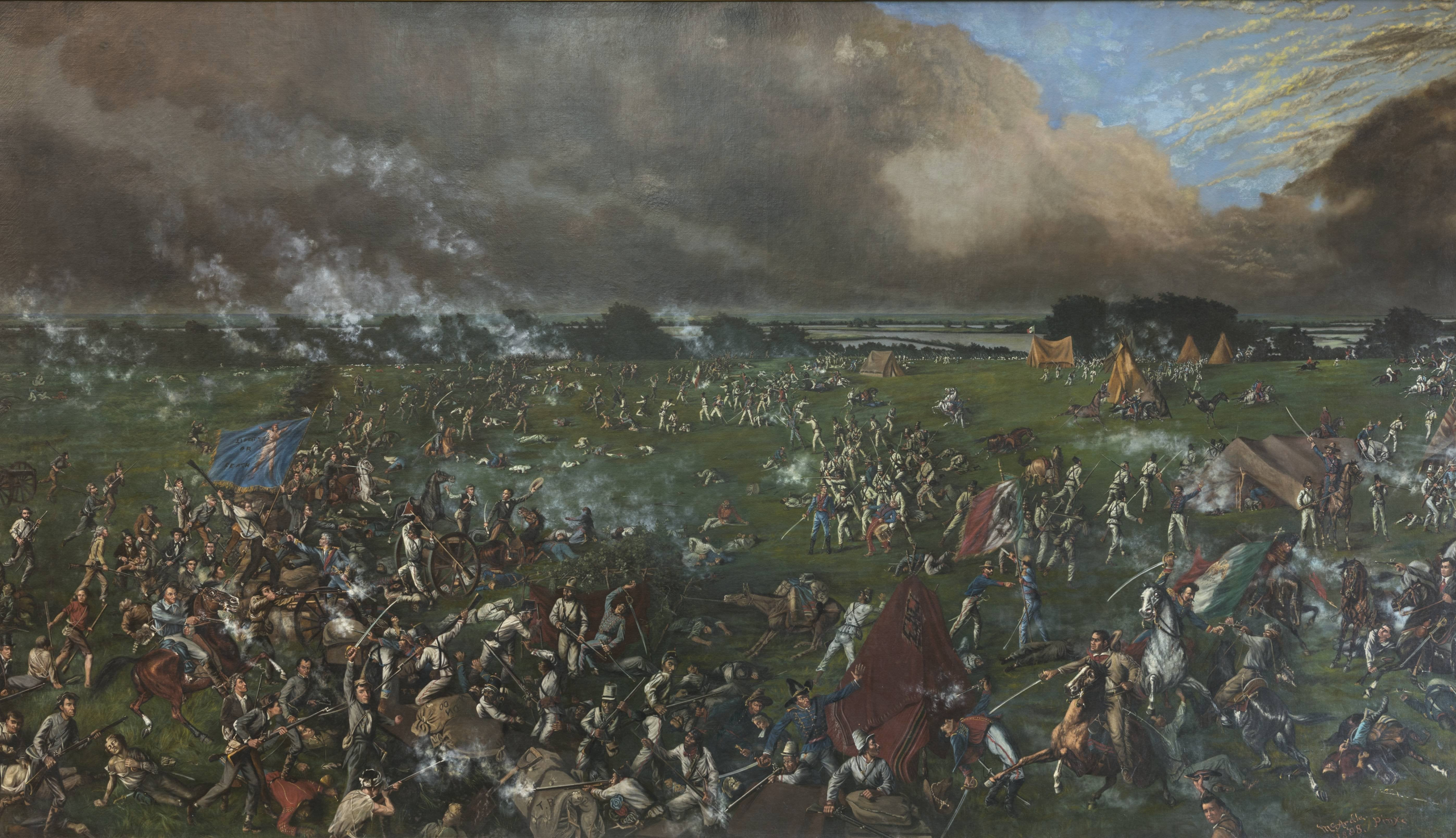
- 1895 painting
- Artist: Henry Arthur McArdle

The Battle of San Jacinto
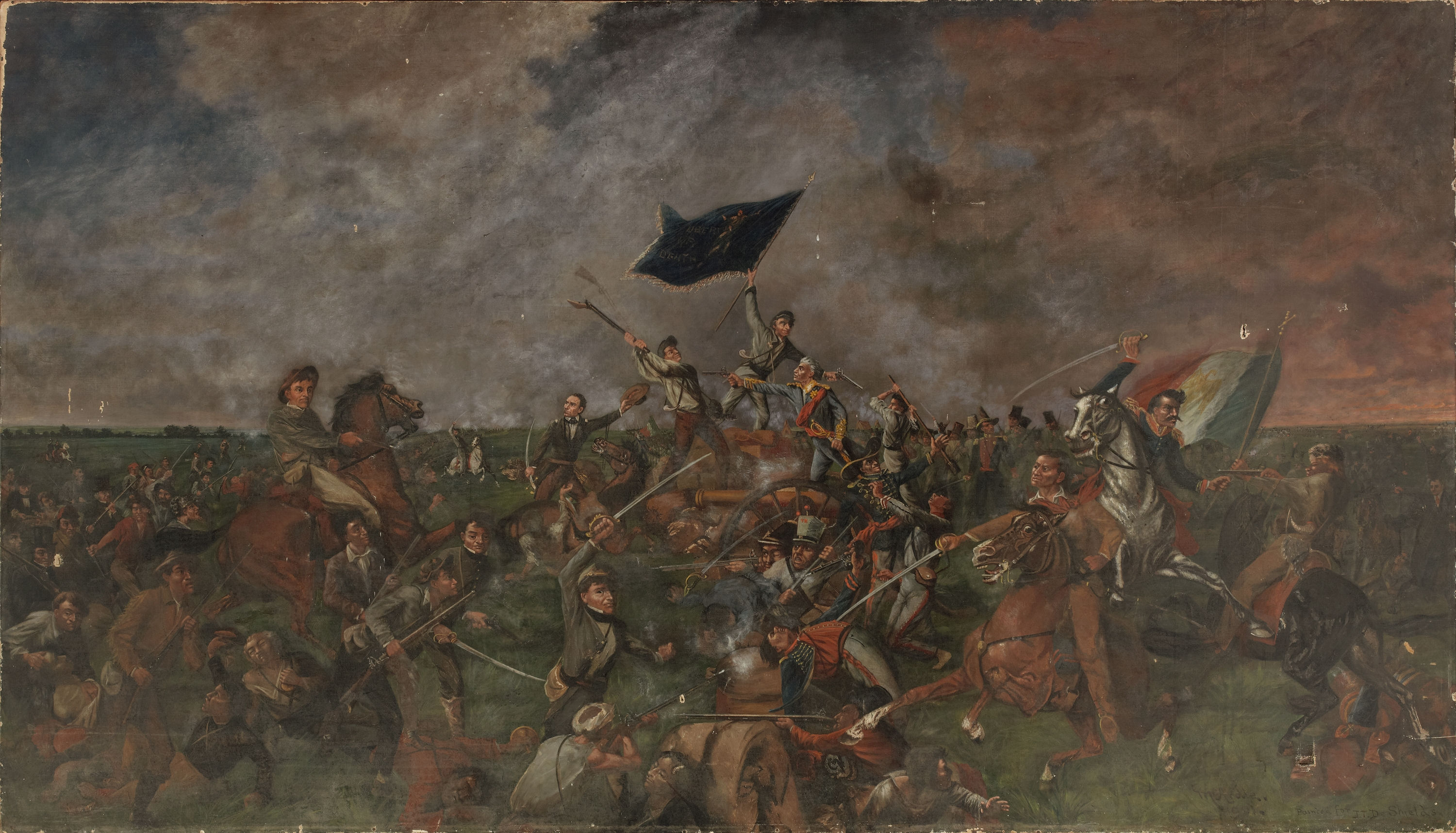
- 1901 painting
- Artist: Henry Arthur McArdle

The Battle of San Jacinto refers to at least two paintings by Henry Arthur McArdle depicting the Battle of San Jacinto. One version, measuring approximately 8 feet (2.4 m) by 14 feet (4.3 m), is installed in the Texas Senate chamber of the Texas State Capitol in Austin, Texas. A smaller oil painting, measuring 5 feet (1.5 m) by 7 feet (2.1 m), was discovered in late 2009; this version is not a copy or study for the painting in the capitol building.

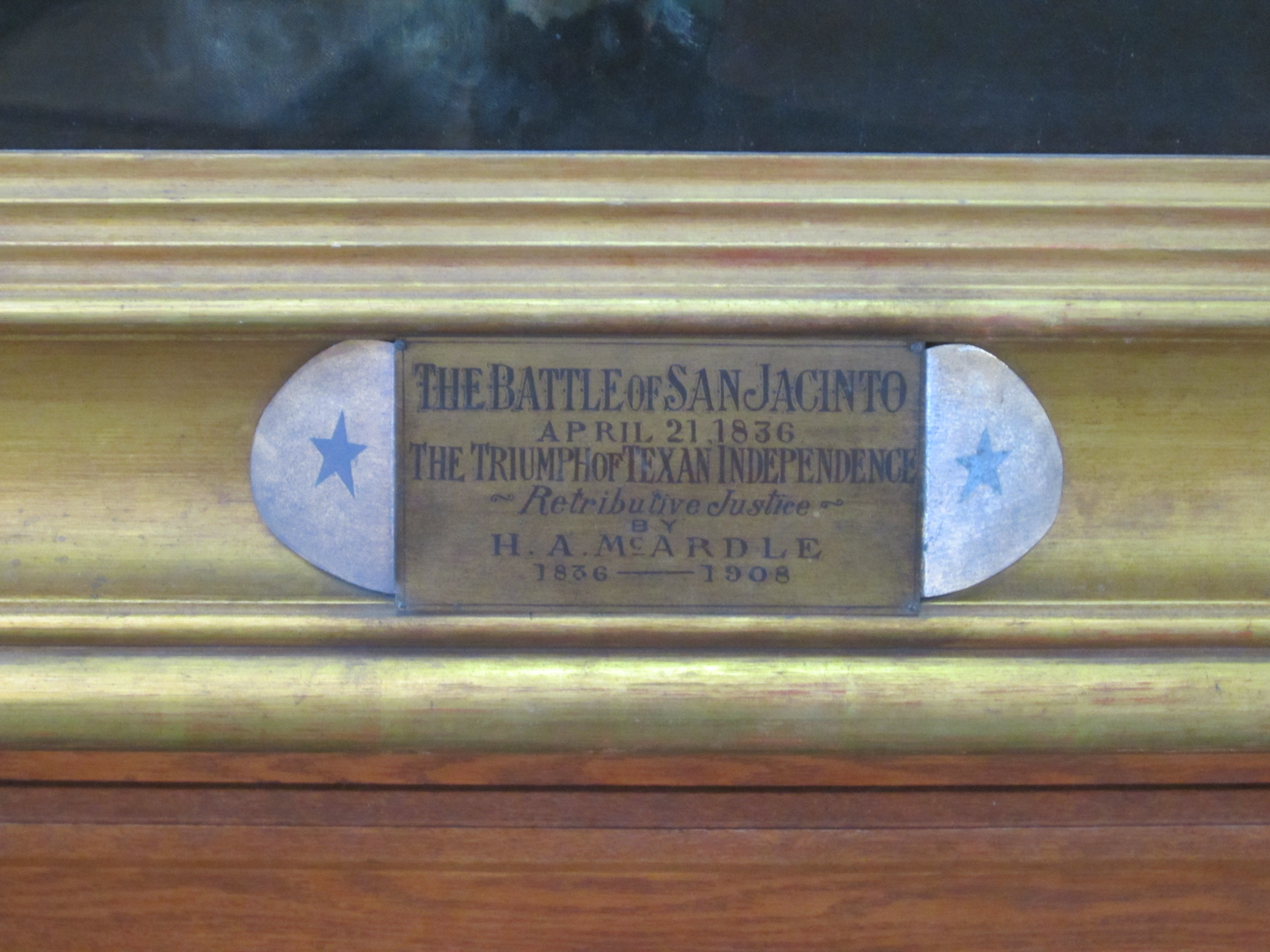
Detail of the frame in the Texas State Capitol
