= The Family Group (Geise) =

Outdoor stone sculpture by John Geise

- The sculpture in October 2015
- Artist: John Geise
- Type: Sculpture
- Medium: Stone
- Location: Eugene, Oregon, United States; 44.04399°N 123.07712°W

The Family Group, or The Family, is an outdoor stone sculpture by John Geise, installed on the south lawn, outside the Jordan Schnitzer Museum of Art, on the University of Oregon campus in Eugene, Oregon, in the United States. Dates from the work range from 1967 to 1973. It was presented to the university in 1974 by the William A. Haseltine family, in honor of administrator Karl Onthank. An inscription reads, "Honoring Karl Onthank whose life on the campus whose life on the campus from 1909 to 1957, bore witness to the love for his fellow man."
