= The Family Group (Umlauf) =

Sculpture in Austin, Texas, U.S.

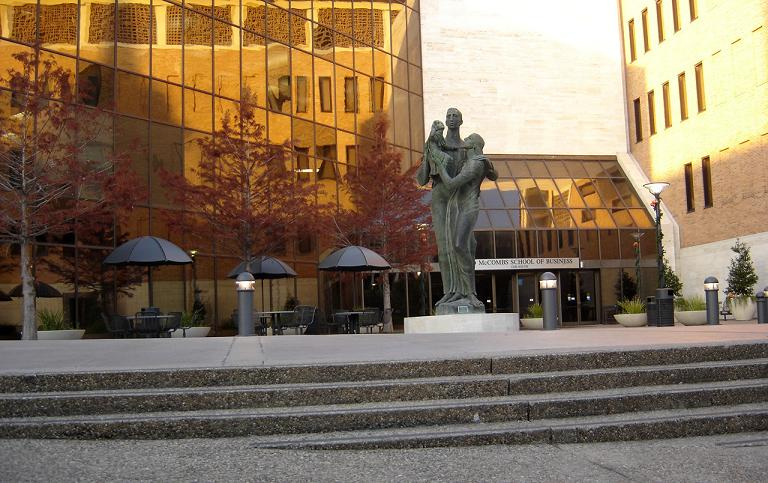
- The sculpture in 2005
- Artist: Charles Umlauf
- Year: 1962
- Type: Bronze sculpture
- Dimensions: 15.5 feet (4.7 m) tall
- Location: Austin, Texas, United States
- 30.283826°N 97.7383°W

The Family Group is a bronze sculpture by Charles Umlauf, installed outside the McCombs School of Business on the University of Texas at Austin campus in Austin, Texas, United States. The statue group depicts a man, a woman, and a child, representing the "most basic economic unit of society".
