= Nancy Rubins =

American artist (born 1952)

- Born: 1952 (age 73–74); Naples, Texas, U.S.
- Education: Maryland Institute College of Art; University of California, Davis.
- Known for: Sculpture, installation art, photography
- Spouse: Chris Burden
- Awards: American Academy of Arts & Letters, Academy Award in Art (2003); Rockefeller Foundation Travel Award (1993)

Nancy Rubins (born 1952) is an American sculptor and installation artist. Her sculptural works are primarily composed of blooming arrangements of large rigid objects such as televisions, small appliances, camping and construction trailers, hot water heaters, mattresses, airplane parts, rowboats, kayaks, canoes, surfboards, and other objects. Works such as Big Edge at CityCenter in Las Vegas contain over 200 boat vessels. Stainless Steel, Aluminum, Monochrome I, Built to Live Anywhere, at Home Here, at the Albright-Knox Art Gallery in Buffalo, contains 66 used aluminum boats and rises to a height of 30 ft.

== Early life and career ==
Rubins was born in Naples, Texas. Her family moved to Cincinnati before settling in Tullahoma, Tennessee. She studied at the Maryland Institute College of Art in Baltimore, Maryland, where she received her BFA in 1974, and then at the University of California, Davis, where she received her MFA in 1976. Rubins taught at Virginia Commonwealth University in Richmond, and Florida State University in Tallahassee, before moving to New York. In New York, along with teaching she ran a house painting business. Rubins resides in Topanga, California, and taught at the University of California, Los Angeles, from 1982 to 2004.

== Work ==
In college, Rubins worked primarily with clay, creating igloo-like sculptures out of mud, concrete, and straw. She was inspired by the work of Peter Voulkos and Robert Arneson. She ended up at UC Davis finishing her MFA and studying with Arneson. Rubins avoided the characteristic permanence of ceramics with the constant disassembling of sculptures, collapsing her work back into the slip bucket or back into raw scraps. Her 1974 piece Mud Slip, Army-Surplus Canvas and Used Cups from Coffee Machine combined found materials with wet clay; it lasted only as long as the clay stayed wet. Her creation of unlikely assemblages grew as she began to incorporate more detritus and found materials into her work.

After college, Rubins taught night classes at City College of San Francisco and scavenged the local Goodwill and Salvation Army stores in San Francisco, where she was living at the time, collecting nearly 300 television sets for 25 to 50 cents apiece. In 1977 she taught for a year at Virginia Commonwealth University where she started working with used appliances.

Rubins was privately commissioned to create her first public installation in 1980. Big Bil-Bored was a controversial artwork, voted "Ugliest Sculpture in Chicago" in a radio poll. Constructed of various discarded appliances, the installation towered forty-three feet high outside of the Cermak Plaza shopping center in Berwyn, Illinois. Soon after, Rubins was offered a commission for another public installation. In 1982, the Washington Project for the Arts funded Rubins's Worlds Apart, a forty-five foot tall temporary installation composed of abandoned appliances, concrete and steel rebar. Her work overlooked the Whitehurst Freeway, blocks from the Watergate Building in Washington D.C., and again caused controversy. The sculpture was taken down as soon as the permit expired. While in Washington Rubins was contacted by artist Charles Ray to teach at UCLA where she met Chris Burden.

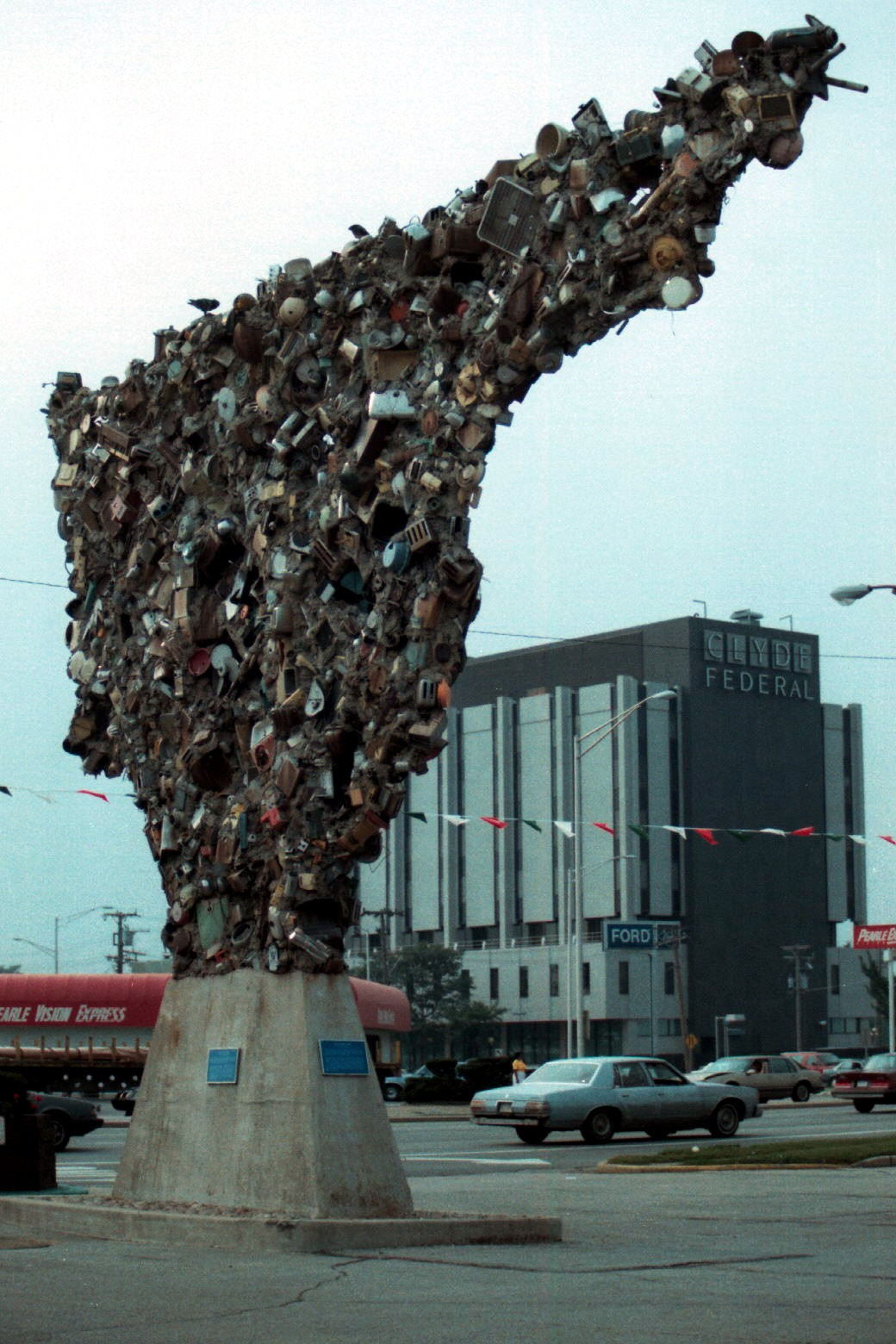
Big Bill Bored, 1980.

Rubins is perhaps best known for building sculptures out of salvaged airplane parts, such as an installation in 1995 for the Museum of Modern Art in New York; the piece weighed nearly 10,000 pounds. Already by the mid-1980s she had begun regularly using abandoned airplane parts in her work. Her contact for the plane parts was Bill Huffman in the Mojave desert. For durability, she chose aluminum, fiberglass and composites rather than wood. Rubins collaborated with husband Chris Burden on a number of projects, including an installation called A Monument to Megalopolises Past and Future at Los Angeles Contemporary Exhibitions (LACE) in 1987.

In the late 1980s Rubins started working with discarded mattresses which were inspired by pastries she saw in Vienna – both relate to dreams in her mind. In 1993 she made a sculpture of cakes and mattresses at UCLA. It was shown at Paul Kasmin Gallery in New York

Boats entered Rubins' sculptural vocabulary in the 2000s.

Rubins also started working with assembling discarded cast- aluminum playground structures. Most of these structures were built out of melted down WWII materials. These pieces were shown at the Gagosian gallery in 2014.

Aside from sculpture, Rubins is known for her large scale graphite drawings which resemble lead sheets.

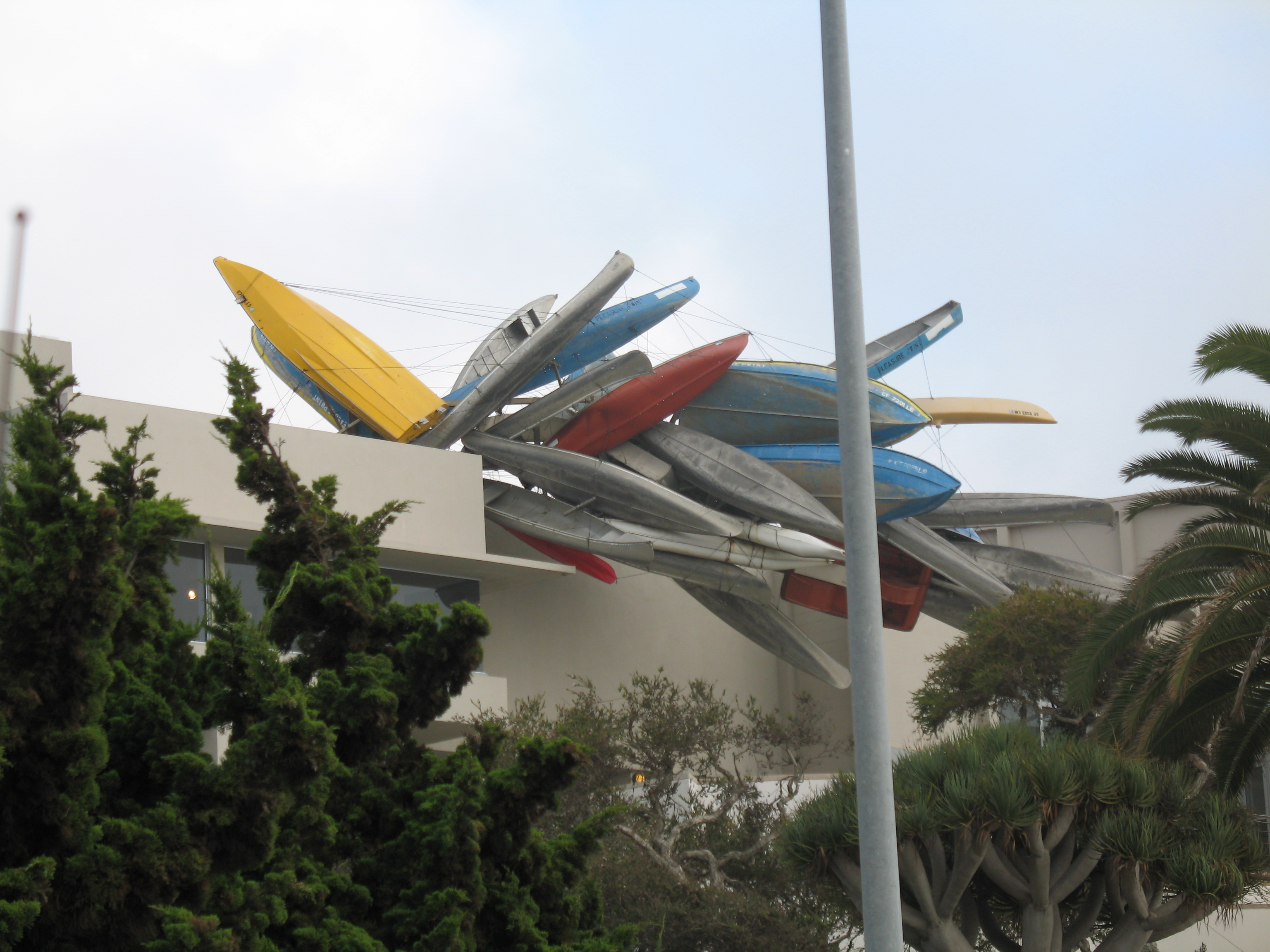
Pleasure Point projecting out from the roof at the Museum of Contemporary Art San Diego, La Jo lla. 2007

== Exhibitions ==
Rubins's work has been shown internationally. Her solo museum exhibitions include those hosted by Museum of Contemporary Art, San Diego (1994); The Museum of Modern Art, New York (1995); ARTPACE, San Antonio (1997); Miami Art Museum (1999); Fonds regional d'art contemporain de Bourgogne, France (2005); SculptureCenter, Long Island City, New York (2006); Lincoln Center, New York (2006); and Navy Pier, Chicago (2013). In 1993, Rubins was invited to participate in the Venice Biennale. She was included in the Whitney Biennial that same year.

== Selected solo exhibitions ==
- 2010: "Works for New Space, Stainless Steel, Aluminum, Monochrome I & II," Gagosian Gallery, Beverly Hills
  - "Skins, Structures, Landmasses," Gagosian Gallery, Beverly Hills
- 2006: "A Big Pleasure Point," at Lincoln Center, New York with The Public Art Fund
  - "Collages," Paul Kasmin Gallery, New York
  - Sculpture Center, New York
- 2005: FRAC Bourgogne, Dijon, France

"Small Forest," Paul Kasmin Gallery, New York

- 2003: Fondation Cartier pour l'Art Contemporain, France
  - Neue Galerie, Graz, Austria
- 2001: Paul Kasmin Gallery, New York
  - Gagosian Gallery, Beverly Hills

== Public collections ==
Installations can be found in the public collections of the Museum of Contemporary Art, Los Angeles, the Museum of Contemporary Art, San Diego, the Museum of Modern Art, New York, the Museum of Contemporary Art, Chicago, and the Eli Broad Foundation, Los Angeles. Large scale, outdoor sculptures are on permanent display at institutions throughout the world, including the Albright Knox Art Gallery, Buffalo, Université Paris Diderot, Paris and on the University of Texas at Austin campus.

== Awards ==
- Maryland Institute College of Art Alumni Award (2000)
- Flintridge Foundation Visual Artist Award (1997–98)
- Rockefeller Foundation Travel Award (1993)
- The Louis Comfort Tiffany Foundation, Awards in Painting, Sculpture, Printmaking, Photography, and Craft Media (1991)
- Creative Artists Public Service Grant, New York State Council for the Arts (1981)
- National Endowment for the Arts (1981, 1980, 1977)

== Sculptures ==
- Big Bil-Bored, Berwyn, IL (1980)
- Chas’ Stainless Steel, Mark Thompson’s Airplane Parts, About 1000 Pounds of Stainless Steel Wire, and Gagosian's Beverly Hills Space, Museum of Contemporary Art, Los Angeles, Los Angeles, CA (2001)
- Airplane Parts & Hills, Österreichischer Skulpturenpark (Austrian Sculpture Park), Unterpremstätten (2003)
- Pleasure Point, Museum of Contemporary Art San Diego, San Diego, CA (2006)
- Big Pleasure Point, Lincoln Center New York, NY (2006)
- Big Edge, CityCenter, Las Vegas, NV (2009)
- Stainless Steel, Aluminum, Monochrome I, Built to Live Anywhere, at Home Here, Albright-Knox Art Gallery, Buffalo, NY (2011)
- Monochrome for Paris, Esplanade Pierre Vidal-Naquet, Paris, France (2013)
