= Nave (disambiguation) =

A nave is the middle, center, or body of a church, or (etymologically unrelated) the hub of a wheel.

Nave or naves may also refer to:

== Places ==
=== France ===
- Nave (river), a river in Pas-de-Calais, France
- Navès, Tarn, a commune in the Tarn department
- Naves, Allier, a commune in the Allier department
- Naves, Corrèze, a commune in the Corrèze department
- Naves, Nord, a commune in the Nord department
- Nâves-Parmelan, a commune in the Haute-Savoie department

=== Israel ===
- Naveh, Israel, a moshav in southern Israel also transliterated as Nave

=== Italy ===
- Nave, Lombardy, a comune in the Province of Brescia
- Nave San Rocco, a comune in the Province of Trento, Trentino-Alto Adige/Südtirol

=== Portugal ===
- Nave, Sabugal, a parish in the Municipality of Sabugal
- Nave de Haver, a parish in the Municipality of Almeida
- Naves, Almeida, a parish in the municipality of Almeida

=== Spain ===
- Navès, Lleida, a municipality of province of Lleida, Catalonia
- Naves, Llanes, a parish in the municipality of Llanes, Asturias
- Naves, Oviedo, a parish in the municipality of Oviedo, Asturias

== Other uses ==
- Nave Espacial de Varginha, Brazilian tower
- Naves (grape), a Spanish wine grape
- Nave (surname)
- Nave Nave Mahana, painting
- La nave, an opera by Italian composer Italo Montemezzi
- La Nave del Olvido, album
