= Terry's Texas Rangers Monument =

Memorial in Austin, Texas, U.S.

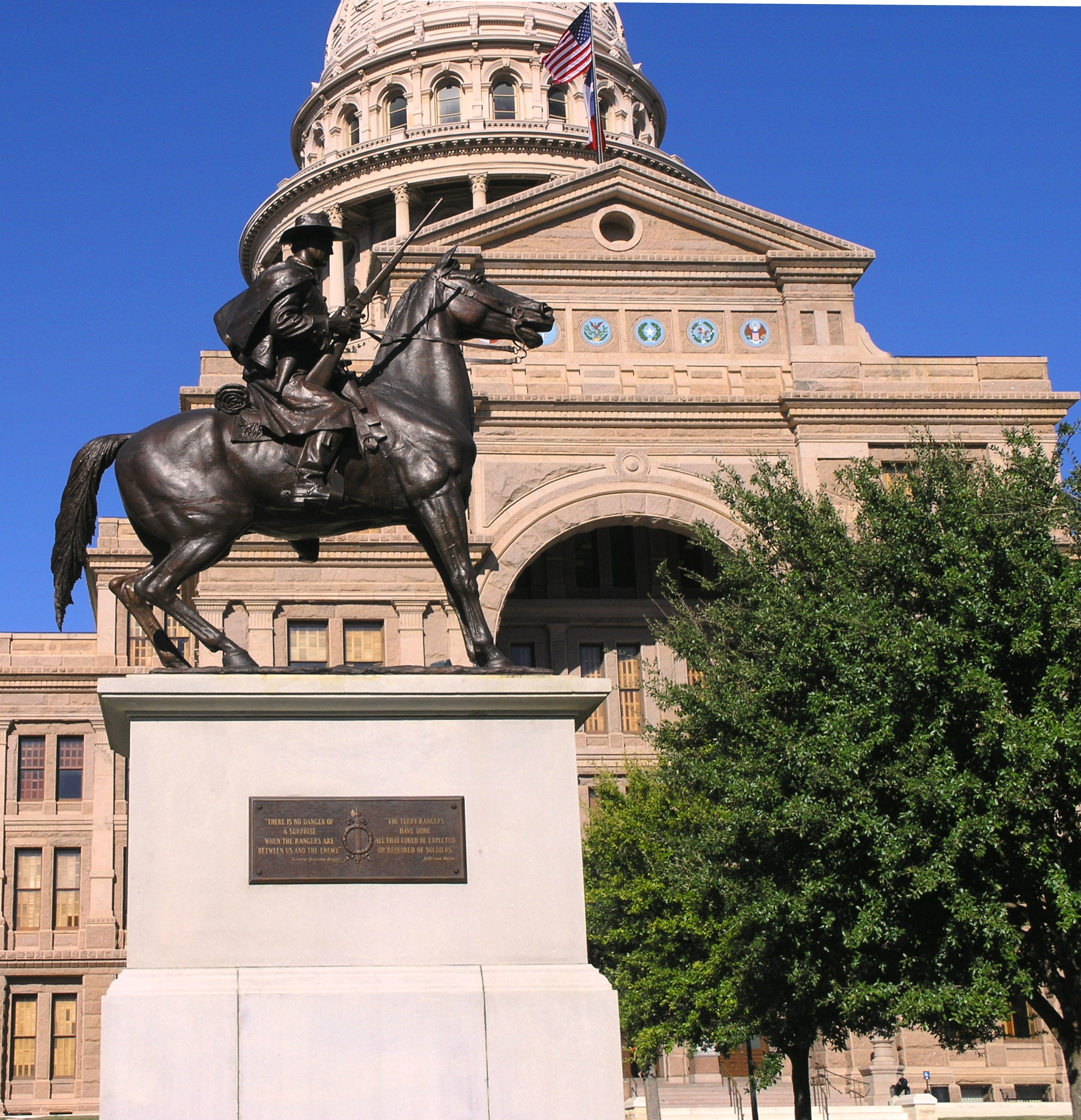
- The monument outside the Texas State Capitol in 2006
- Artist: Pompeo Coppini
- Year: 1907
- Medium: Bronze sculpture
- Location: Austin, Texas, United States
- 30.273923°N 97.740813°W
- Owner: Texas State Preservation Board

Terry's Texas Rangers Monument is an outdoor memorial commemorating Terry's Texas Rangers, a regiment of the Confederate Army installed on the Texas State Capitol grounds in Austin, Texas, United States. The monument was designed by Pompeo Coppini and erected in 1907.

== History ==
The state of Texas ran a competition in 1905 in order to commission an equestrian statue commemorating Terry's Texas Rangers. There were seventeen entrants but it was won by Pompeo Coppini, over German-born Elisabet Ney whom had previously been the favored artist for Texas art. Coppini also received criticism from her for opting to sculpt the monument in bronze rather than stone. It was unveiled in public in 1907. When it was unveiled, Travis County representative John H. Robertson said: "Like all great conflicts, it was the result of an assertion of power on one side, and the defense of what was believed to be the right on the other side."

In 2020, following the George Floyd protests, Texas Democratic Party politicians called for the Texas Rangers monument to be removed from the Capitol grounds along with all other Confederate monuments. In 2021, they introduced a bill into the Texas House of Representatives in order to remove the Confederate monument and all other Confederate commemorations in Texas. The bill died in committee and other similar attempts to remove the Texas Rangers Monument did not receive a hearing by the Republican-majority House.

== Design ==
It features a bronze ranger carrying a rifle on a horse. The base features quotes praising the Texas Rangers from President of the Confederate States, Jefferson Davis, and Confederate Officer Braxton Bragg either side of a wreath covered fasces.

== See also ==
- 1907 in art
- Lost Cause of the Confederacy
- List of Confederate monuments and memorials
