= Hood's Texas Brigade Monument =

Monument in Austin, Texas, U.S.

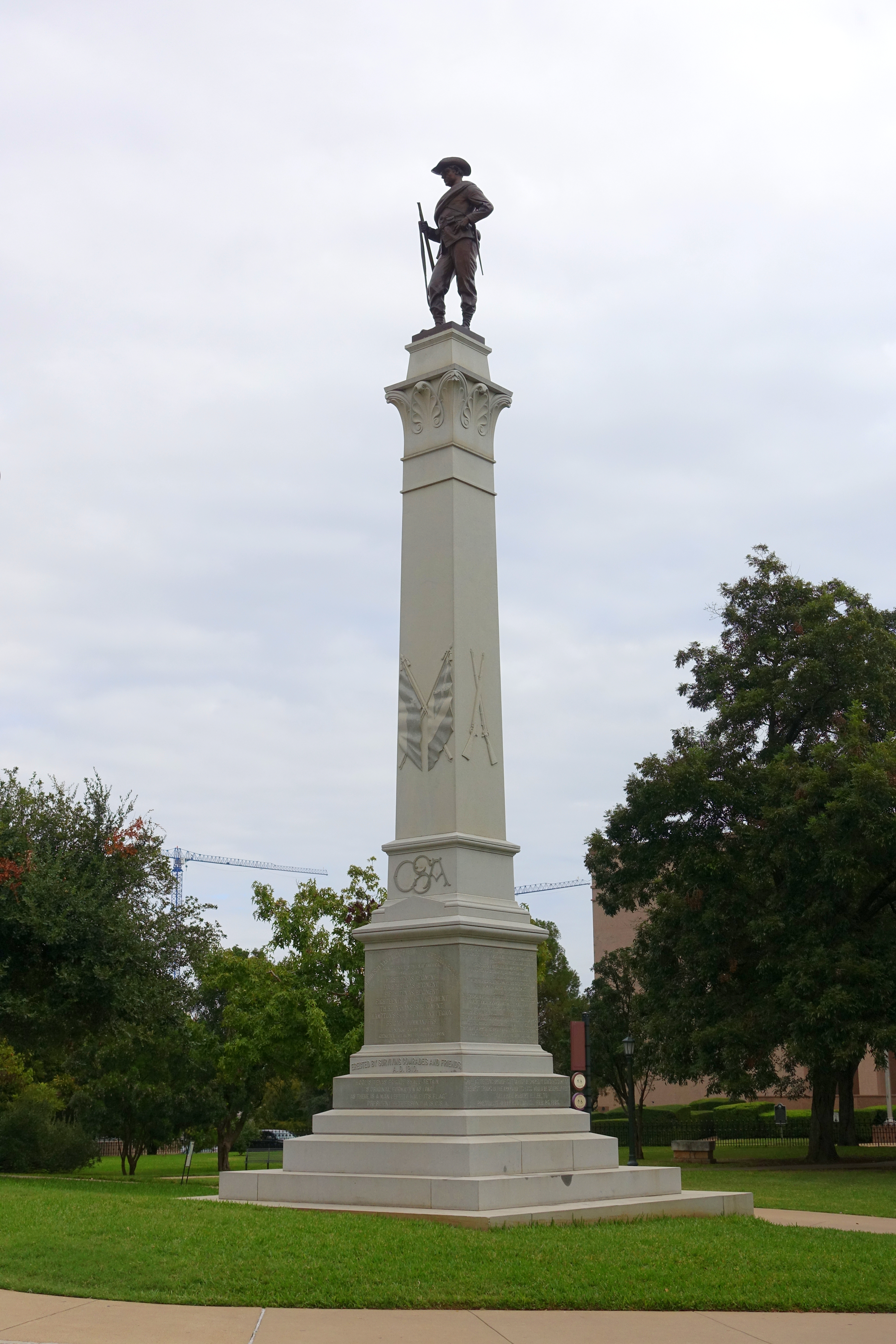
- The monument in 2015
- Artist: Pompeo Coppini
- Year: 1910
- Medium: Sculpture
- Location: Austin, Texas, United States
- 30°16′27″N 97°44′22″W
- Owner: Texas State Preservation Board

The Hood's Texas Brigade Monument is an outdoor memorial commemorating members of John Bell Hood's Texas Brigade of the Confederate Army installed on the Texas State Capitol grounds in Austin, Texas, United States. The monument was sculptured by Pompeo Coppini and erected in 1910. It is topped by a bronze statue of a Confederate soldier.

== Content ==
On its shaft is the Texas State Flag crossed with the "Blood-Stained Banner" version of the Confederate Flag. Below it are the initials for the Confederate States of America, CSA. The base has quotes praising the Texas Brigade from the President of the Confederacy, Jefferson Davis, Commander of the Confederate Army, Robert E. Lee and Confederate General, Stonewall Jackson.

== See also ==
- 1910 in art
- List of Confederate monuments and memorials
