= Nave (surname) =

Nave is a surname. Notable people with the surname include:

- Bartolomeo della Nave (–1636), Venetian merchant and art collector
- Doyle Nave (1915–1990), American football player
- Eric Nave (1899–1993), Australian cryptographer and intelligence officer
- Felecia M. Nave, American chemical engineer and academic administrator
- Frederick S. Nave (1873–1912), American jurist
- Howie Nave, American stand-up comedian, radio personality, writer, and movie critic
- Johnny Nave, American racing car driver
- Omri Nave (1988–), Israeli footballer
- Orville Nave (1841–1917), American Methodist theologian and U.S. Army chaplain
- Royston Nave (1886–1931), American artist
- Steve Nave (–2015), American actor and casting director
- James H. Nave, American architect
