= Royston Nave =

Royston Nave (1886–1931) was an American artist. Mr. Nave was born in La Grange, Texas on November 5, 1886. His mother was his first art instructor, Lou Scott Royston, who was also a well-known Texas painter. He studied under such diverse mentors as Pompeo Coppini, Texas Culptro ("Confederate Soldier", DeLeon Plaza, Victoria), J. Ferdinand McCan of Victoria, Robert Henri, Walt Kuhn, Lawton Parker, and I.R. Wilson. Nave continued to paint the landscape he was so fond of, as well as commissioned portraits. One of his most well-known, a portrait of Rebecca Fisher, the "Mother of Texas," is in the extensive collection of the State Capitol in Austin. He had many exhibitions in New York, The National Academy, the Pennsylvania Academy and the Cargneie International Exhibition of 1919 in Pittsburgh. As an artist, he enjoyed a prolific and successful painting career both in Texas and New York, He traveled widely, painting and sketching as he went. His primary interests were people and outdoors. He loved the landscape of Texas.

It was in New York that Nave became renowned for his portrait work, of which he had many one-man exhibitions. He left New York to serve in the U.S. Army in World War I, after which he traveled the western United States. He returned to New York to have several more one-man shows, and then returned to Victoria to study with his mentor J. Ferdinand McCan. It was at this time that he met and married his wife Emma. In 1931 he suffered a fatal heart attack while visiting his brother in Harlingen.

In 1932, his widow Emma Nave built the Nave Museum in Victoria, Texas to exhibit his works. She commissioned San Antonio architect Atlee Ayers to design and build the Museum. At first, the museum housed the Nave paintings, and then for a while it served as the first library in Victoria, with the Nave paintings hanging above the bookshelves. When the new public library opened in 1976, the Nave became a fine arts museum. It currently hosts 5 to 6 diverse exhibits per year, featuring local, regional and statewide artists, and occasionally nationally known artists as well.

The Victoria Regional Museum Association, Inc. runs the museum, and still has possession of 43 of the Nave paintings. The Nave paintings have traveled to many museums for display, and are currently being restored and will soon be on display at the Nave on a rotating basis, until a full show happens at the end of 2021.
