= Statue of George Washington (Austin, Texas) =

Bronze statue of George Washington in Austin, Texas, U.S.

George Washington
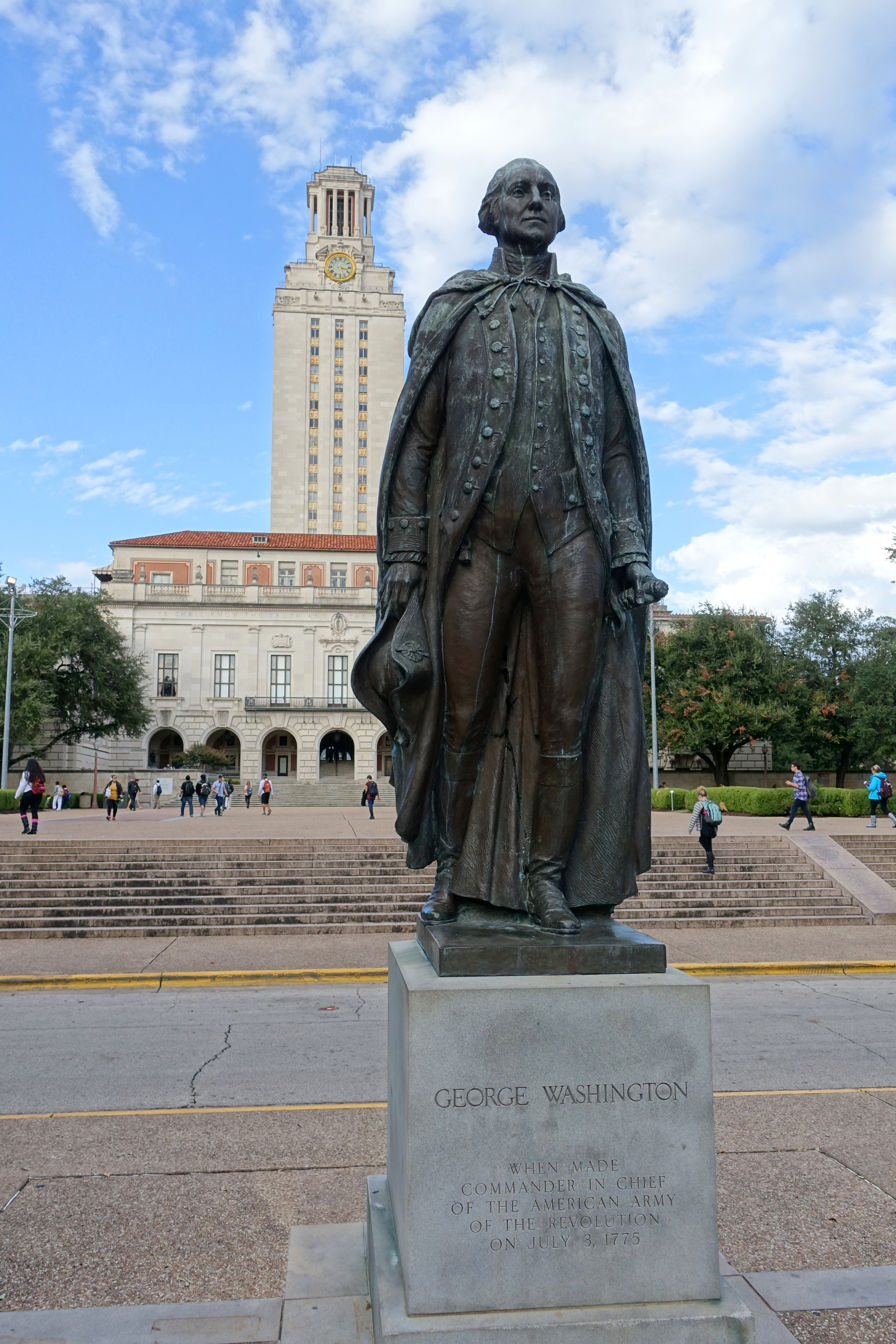
- The statue in front of the Main Building, 2015
- Artist: Pompeo Coppini
- Year: 1955
- Type: Sculpture
- Medium: Bronze
- Subject: George Washington
- Location: Austin, Texas, United States; 30.28491°N 97.739513°W

George Washington is an outdoor 1955 bronze sculpture by Italian American artist Pompeo Coppini, located on the University of Texas at Austin campus in Austin, Texas, United States.

== Background ==
Coppini sculpted three distinct statues of Washington. The first was installed in 1911 in Mexico City. The second was commissioned by Dr. Henry Waldo Coe to commemorate the 1926 sesquicentennial of the Declaration of Independence and was dedicated in Portland. The third statue was installed in February 1955 on the campus of the University of Texas at Austin.

== See also ==
- 1955 in art
- List of monuments dedicated to George Washington
- List of sculptures of presidents of the United States
- List of statues of George Washington
