= Alamo Cenotaph =

- Cenotaph
- U.S. Historic district – Contributing property
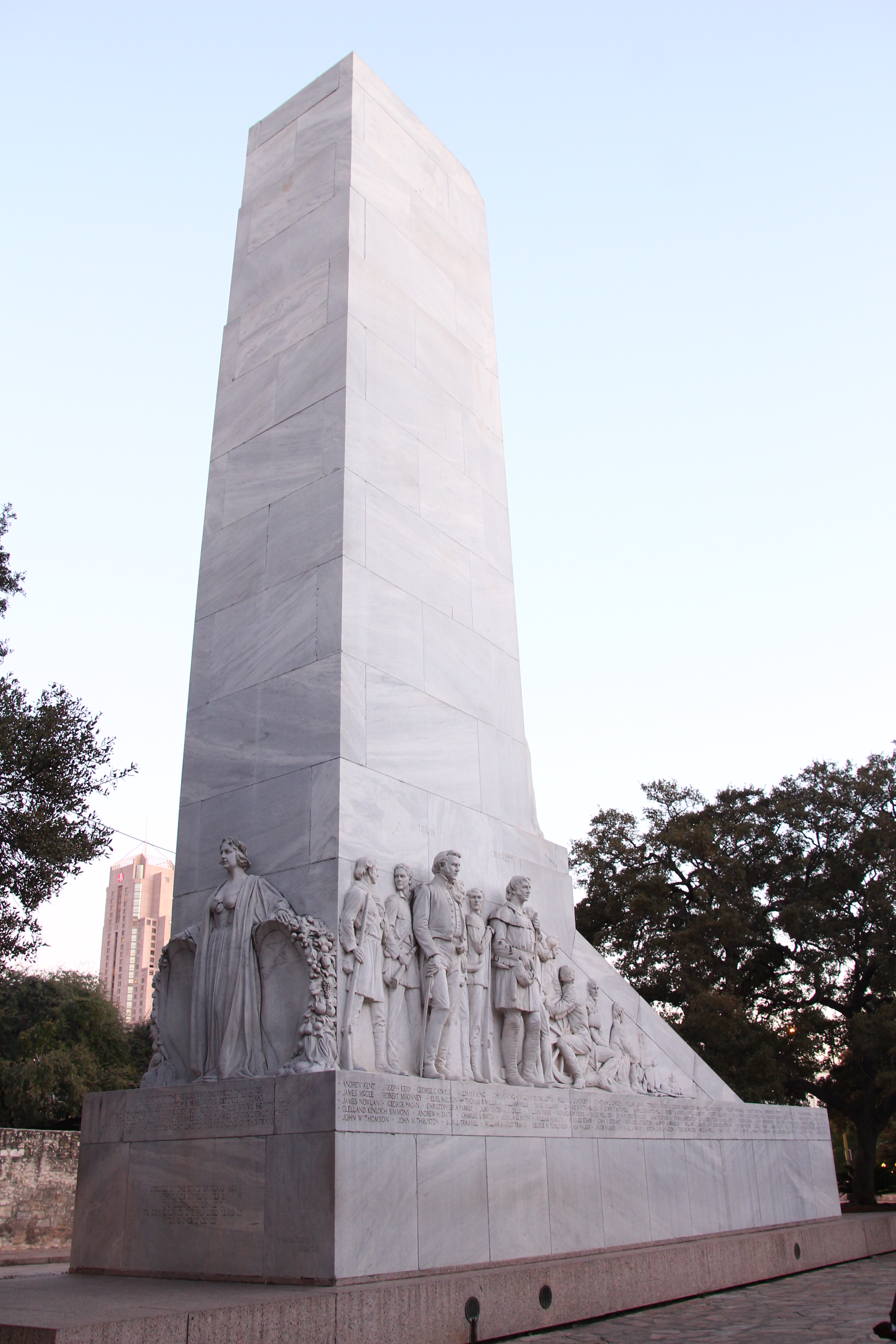
- Alamo Cenotaph in 2013

- Location within Texas Location within the United States
- Location: Alamo Plaza at E. Houston St., San Antonio, Texas
- Coordinates: 29°25′34″N 98°29′12″W
- Built: 1936
- Architect: Adams & Adams
- Sculptor: Pompeo Coppini
- Architectural style: Cenotaph
- Part of: Alamo Plaza Historic District (ID77001425)
- Designated CP: July 13, 1977

The Alamo Cenotaph, also known as The Spirit of Sacrifice, is a monument in San Antonio, Texas, United States, commemorating the Battle of the Alamo of the Texas Revolution, which was fought at the adjacent Alamo Mission. The monument was erected in celebration of the centenary of the battle, and bears the names of those known to have fought there on the Texas side.

== History ==
Although there had been previous plans for Alamo monuments, starting in the late 1800s, the Alamo Cenotaph was the first such erected in San Antonio. (There had been one previous monument in Austin, but it was lost in a Capitol fire.) During the 1936 Texas Centennial celebration, the state of Texas provided $100,000 for the monument, commissioned from local sculptor Pompeo Coppini. San Antonio mayor Maury Maverick held a dedication ceremony on November 11, 1940.

The shaft rises sixty feet from its base which is forty feet long and twelve feet wide. The monument was erected in grey Georgia marble and pink Texas granite. It was entitled The Spirit of Sacrifice and incorporates images of the Alamo garrison leaders and 187 names of known Alamo defenders, derived from the research of historian Amelia Williams. Later research has shown some listed on the cenotaph were not there, and the total of Alamo combatants has risen with newer research.

== Inscription ==
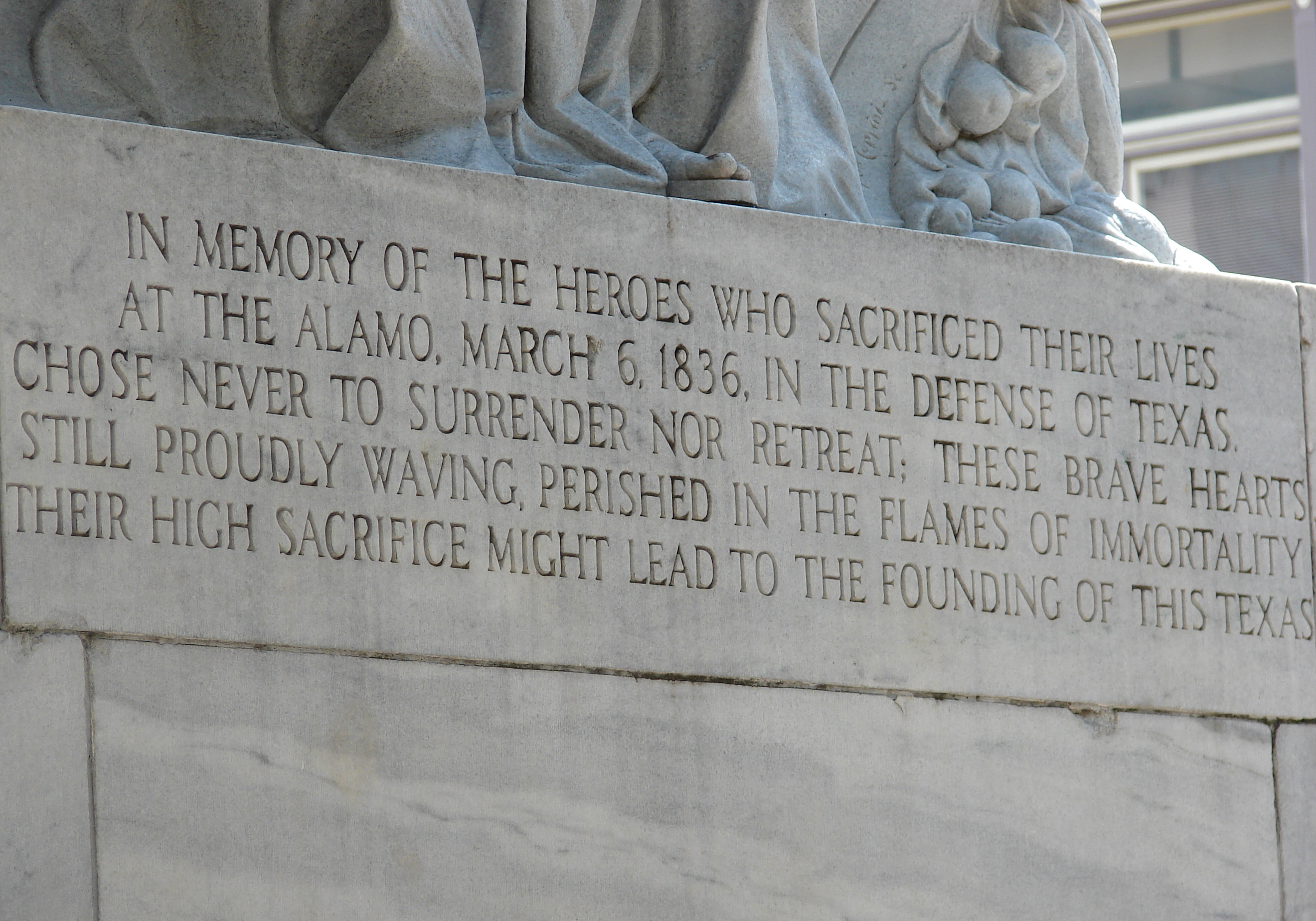
A close up of the inscription on the Alamo Cenotaph

The marker on the cenotaph reads:

Erected in memory of the heroes who sacrificed their lives at the Alamo, March 6, 1836, in the defense of Texas. They chose never to surrender nor retreat; these brave hearts, with flag still proudly waving, perished in the flames of immortality that their high sacrifice might lead to the founding of this Texas.

== Battle of the Alamo ==
After putting down resistance in other regions of Mexico, in the spring of 1836 Santa Anna led a Mexican army back into Texas and marched on San Antonio, intending to avenge the humiliating defeat of Cos and end the Texian rebellion. Texian leader Sam Houston, believing that San Antonio could not be defended against a determined effort by the regular Mexican army, called for the Texian forces to abandon the city.

A volunteer force under the joint command of William Barrett Travis, newly arrived in Texas, and James Bowie, and including Davy Crockett and his company of Tennesseans, and Juan Seguin's company of Hispanic Texan volunteers occupied and fortified the deserted mission and determined to hold San Antonio against all opposition.

The defenders of the Alamo thus included both Anglo and Hispanic Texans who fought side by side under a banner that was the flag of Mexico with the numerals "1824" superimposed. This was meant to indicate that the defenders were fighting for their rights to democratic government under the Mexican constitution of that year. It was only during the siege that the Texas Congress declared an independent Republic of Texas.

The Battle of the Alamo took place from February 23 to March 6, 1836. At first the battle was primarily a siege marked by artillery duels and small skirmishes. After twelve days Santa Anna, tired of waiting for his heavy artillery and eager for a glorious victory to enhance his reputation, determined to take the Alamo by storm.

Before dawn on March 6, he launched his troops against the walls of the Alamo in three separate attacks. The third attack overwhelmed the defenses of the weak north wall. The defenders retreated to the now famous Long Barracks and the Chapel and fought to the last man. Most historians agree that a few of the defenders were captured but were executed as rebels on the specific orders of Santa Anna. The deaths of these "Martyrs to Texas Independence" inspired greater resistance to Santa Anna's regime, and the cry "Remember the Alamo" became the rallying point of the Texas Revolution.

== Ozzy Osbourne incident ==
In 1982, Ozzy Osbourne, while wearing his future wife's dress because she had hidden his clothes, drunkenly urinated on the Alamo Cenotaph. A police officer arrested him, and Osbourne was subsequently banned from performing in San Antonio for a decade. Later Osbourne apologized for his action and donated $10,000 to the Daughters of the Republic of Texas. The Alamo social media accounts paid a tribute to Osbourne following his death in 2025.

== Renovation and Ownership ==
In 2020 Texas Land Commissioner George P. Bush (R) spearheaded a $450 million project in partnership with the City of San Antonio to renovate the Alamo which included moving the Cenotaph to make the plaza it's in “period neutral” and defended the action by saying that the Cenotaph is “basically falling apart from within.” Bush, who was also campaigning for the 2022 Texas Attorney General election, was heavily criticized for his management of the renovation project including by Lieutenant Governor Dan Patrick who threatened to wrest control of the Alamo away from the General Land Office due to how the Alamo was to be presented at the site and due to the new museum which planned on focusing on the role slavery and Tejanos played in both the Alamo’s history and the Texas war for independence from Mexico. During the George Floyd protests the Cenotaph would be vandalized with red spray paint denouncing white supremacy, profits over people and the Alamo itself. Later that year the proposal to move the monument was defeated by the Texas Historical Commission. In the 2020 primary election, 97% of Republican voters approved a ballot proposition to keep the monument at its location, and Republican state lawmakers also denounced the proposal. In 2021 the San Antonio city council adopted a resolution to move ahead with modified renovations which would leave the Cenotaph in place.

In May 2024 the City of San Antonio formally transferred ownership of the monument over to the State of Texas. The state will be responsible for what are expected to be costly repairs, after a survey found that it will need a new foundation, and that rainwater has caused cracks that put it at risk of breaking apart.

The Alamo Trust provided a live cam of the Cenotaph allowing the renovations to viewed.

Texas officials rededicated the restored Alamo Cenotaph on Veterans Day, 2025, marking 85 years since the monument’s original dedication. The Texas General Land Office and Alamo Trust hosted the rededication. Workers had fixed the drainage system, replaced deteriorating brick infill, and secured marble stones that had shifted over time. Both Texas Land Commissioner Dr. Dawn Buckingham and Alamo Trust President Hope Andrade participated in the ceremony.

== See also ==
- Siege of the Alamo
- List of Alamo defenders
- National Register of Historic Places listings in Bexar County, Texas
