= Nave Nave Mahana =

1896 painting by Paul Gauguin

Nave Nave Mahana (Delicious day)
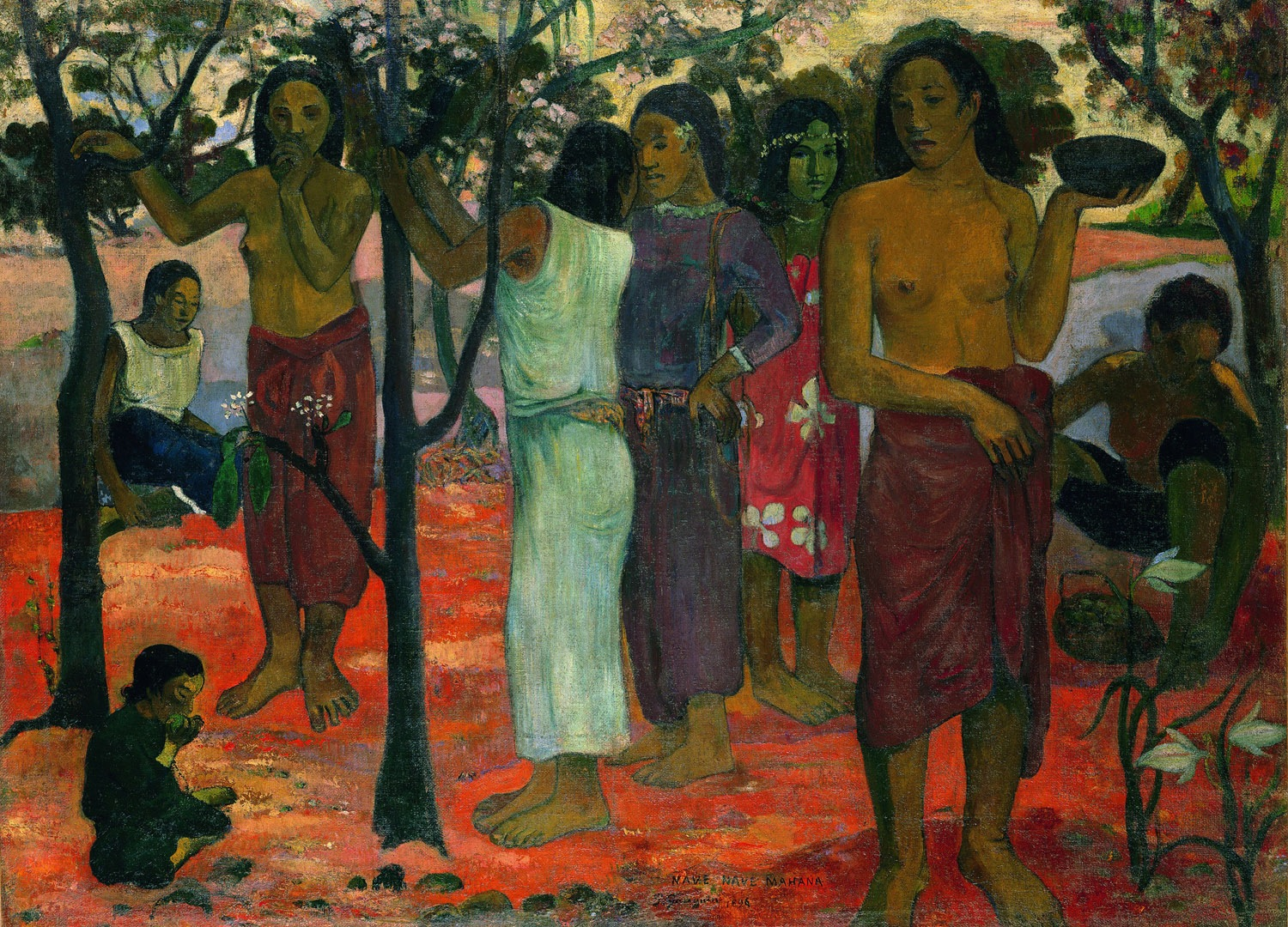
- Artist: Paul Gauguin
- Year: 1896
- Type: Oil painting
- Dimensions: 95 cm × 130 cm (37 in × 51 in)
- Location: Museum of Fine Arts of Lyon, Lyon

Nave Nave Mahana (Tahitian: Delicious day) was made in 1896 by Paul Gauguin in Tahiti. It is kept in the Museum of Fine Arts of Lyon. The painting became part of the collections of the Lyon Museum in 1913.

== History ==
In 1891, Gauguin sailed to Polynesia to escape the evils of European civilization and "everything that is artificial and conventional". To his disappointment, Polynesia was already tainted by European influences when he first arrived in his long-dreamed-of paradise.

His works of that period are full of quasi-religious symbolism and an exoticized view of the inhabitants of Polynesia.

In 1896, he painted Nave Nave Mahana in Tahiti after he came back from a short stay in France.

The painting was exhibited at the Grand Palais in Paris as part of the Gauguin the Alchemist exhibition which was held from October 11, 2017 to January 22, 2018.

== Subject ==
A group of young women seem to be gathering fruit from the branches of plants. Their feet are solidly anchored on the red ground. Behind them, we can see a yellow sky. Frozen, distant, silent, with eyes cast down and solemn faces, the figures are perhaps a revealing indication of the artist's isolation and ill health at the time of painting.
