= Pompeo Coppini =

Italian-American sculptor (1870–1957)

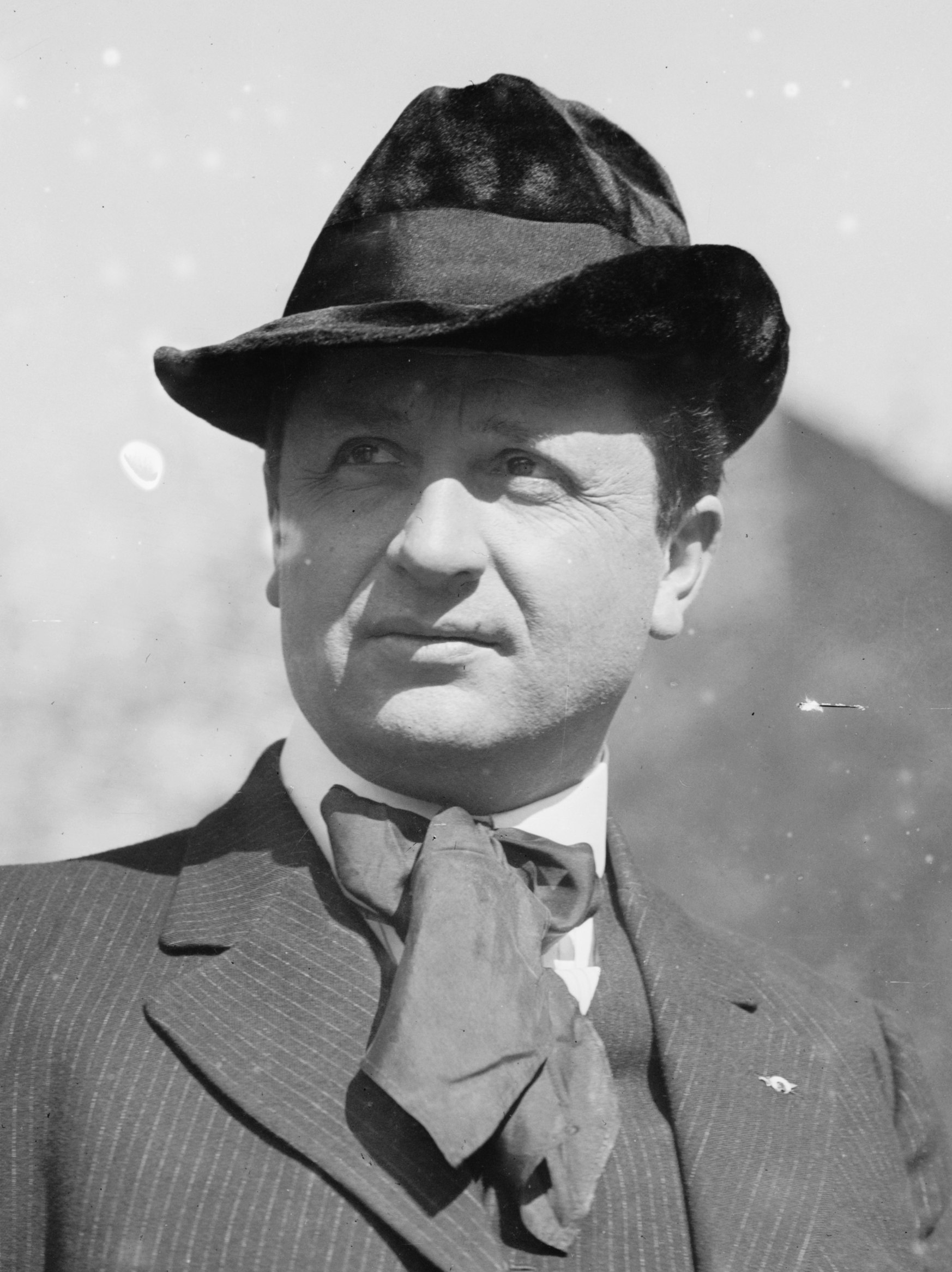
- Coppini in 1928
- Born: Pompeo Luigo Coppini; 19 May 1870; Moglia, Lombardy, Kingdom of Italy
- Died: 26 September 1957 (aged 87); San Antonio, Texas, U.S.
- Citizenship: Italy; United States (from 1902)
- Education: Accademia dell'Arte del Disegno; Augusto Rivalta
- Known for: Sculpture
- Notable work: Partial listing - Sculptures, except where noted Italy: The King Humbert Tablet, Royal Museum, Monza; Mexico: Mexico City; Bust of President Porfirio Diaz; George Washington Monument; Kentucky: 1911 John Hunt Morgan Memorial, Lexington; Michigan: 1925 John Ball and Children, Grand Rapids; New Jersey: Neptune Fountain, Orphan Asylum, Kearny; New York: 1900 William McKinley; 1930 Spirit of the Rotary; 1931 150th Anniversary Masonic Grand Lodge Plaque, Utica; 1934 Bust of Dr. John Robert Gregg; 1935 Woodrow Wilson; 1933 Memorial to Benjamin Franklin, John Adams and Edward Rutledge, Staten Island, New York; 1941 George B. Cortelyou; Texas: 1934 Texas Centennial Half Dollar; Austin; 1901 Texas Confederate Monument, Capitol Grounds; 1903 Victims of the Galveston Flood, UT campus; 1907 Terry's Texas Rangers, Capitol Grounds; 1910 Hood's Brigade, Capitol Grounds; 1912 Stephen F. Austin, Texas State Cemetery; 1915 Joanna Troutman-Designer of the Texas Flag, Texas State Cemetery; 1933 Littlefield Fountain and free-standing statues, UT campus: Jefferson Davis; Robert E. Lee; James Hogg; Albert Sidney Johnston; John H. Reagan; Woodrow Wilson; 1955 George Washington, University of Texas; Ballinger; 1919 Charles H. Noyes, Courthouse lawn; Beaumont; 1912 George O'Brien Millard, Pipkin Park; Cameron; 1922 Mr. and Mrs C.H. YOE; College Station; 1919 Lawrence Sullivan Ross, TAMU Campus; Corpus Christi; 1914 Queen of the Sea; Dallas; 1936 Prospero Bernardi, Fair Park; Galveston; 1904 Woodmen of the World, Lakeview Cemetery; Gonzales; 1910 Come and Take It!; Huntsville; 1911 Sam Houston Memorial, Oakwood Cemetery; McKinney; 1911 James W. Throckmorton, McKinney Courthouse Lawn; Palestine; 1911 John H. Reagan Memorial; Paris; 1903 Confederate Monument; San Antonio; 1926 Scottish Rite Cathedral doors; 1929 Enlightening of the Press, Entrance of the San Antonio Express Publishing Company; 1939 Spirit of Sacrifice (a.k.a. The Cenotaph), Alamo Plaza; 1946 Genius of Music (w Waldine Tauch), Brackenridge Park; 1953 Coppini Memorial Sunset Memorial Park (Coppini’s gravesite), 1972 George Washington Brackenridge (sculpted by Coppini 1930s, cast by Waldine Tauch, bureaucratic red tape delayed installation until 1972); Winn Family Gravesite, City Cemetery #1; Shiner; 1919 Julius A. Wolters; Victoria; 1912 Firing Line, DeLeon Plaza and Bandstand; Waco; 1905 Burleson Memorial, Baylor Campus; 1938 R.E.B. Baylor, Baylor Campus
- Spouse: Elizabeth di Barbieri
- Children: Waldine Tauch (foster daughter)
- Website: Coppini Academy

Signature
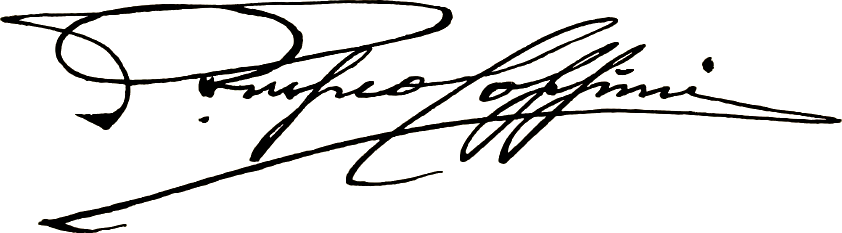

Pompeo Luigi Coppini (19 May 1870 – 26 September 1957) was an Italian-American sculptor. Although his works can be found in Italy, Mexico and a number of U.S. states, the majority of his work can be found in Texas. He is particularly famous for the Alamo Plaza work, Spirit of Sacrifice, a.k.a. The Alamo Cenotaph, as well as numerous statues honoring Texan figures, such as Lawrence Sullivan Ross, the fourth President of Texas A&M University.

== Early years ==
Coppini was born in Moglia, Province of Mantua, Italy, the son of musician Giovanni Coppini and his wife, Leandra (Raffa) Coppini. The family moved to Florence where at the age of ten, Pompeo was hired to make ceramic whistles shaped like horses.

From there, he worked for a sculptor who made tourist knock-offs of great works of art. At age sixteen, he studied at Accademia dell'Arte del Disegno under Augusto Rivalta. Upon earning a degree, Coppini opened a short-lived studio making gratis busts of local celebrities. While working for a cemetery monument sculptor, Coppini tried to become co-owner of the business by courting the owner's daughter. The girl's mother balked, and the resulting situation got Coppini denounced from a local priest's pulpit.

== United States ==
Coppini emigrated to the United States in March 1896 with nothing but a trunk of clothes and $40 to his name. He got a job in New York sculpting figures for a wax museum. Elizabeth di Barbieri of New Haven, Connecticut arrived, accompanied by a chaperone, to model for Coppini's memorial to Francis Scott Key. He fell in love and married his model. Coppini became a United States citizen in 1902.

While he managed to find work in New York, Coppini was frustrated the fame and greatness escaped him. He moved to Texas in 1901, to join with German-born sculptor Frank Teich.

He was then commissioned to do the figures for the Confederate monument for the state capitol grounds. For the next fifteen years, he lived and worked in San Antonio. After spending a short time in Chicago, Illinois, he then spent three years in New York City overseeing the Littlefield commission for the University of Texas at Austin. He collaborated with architect Paul Cret on the Littlefield Memorial Fountain, and sculpted six statues for the campus.

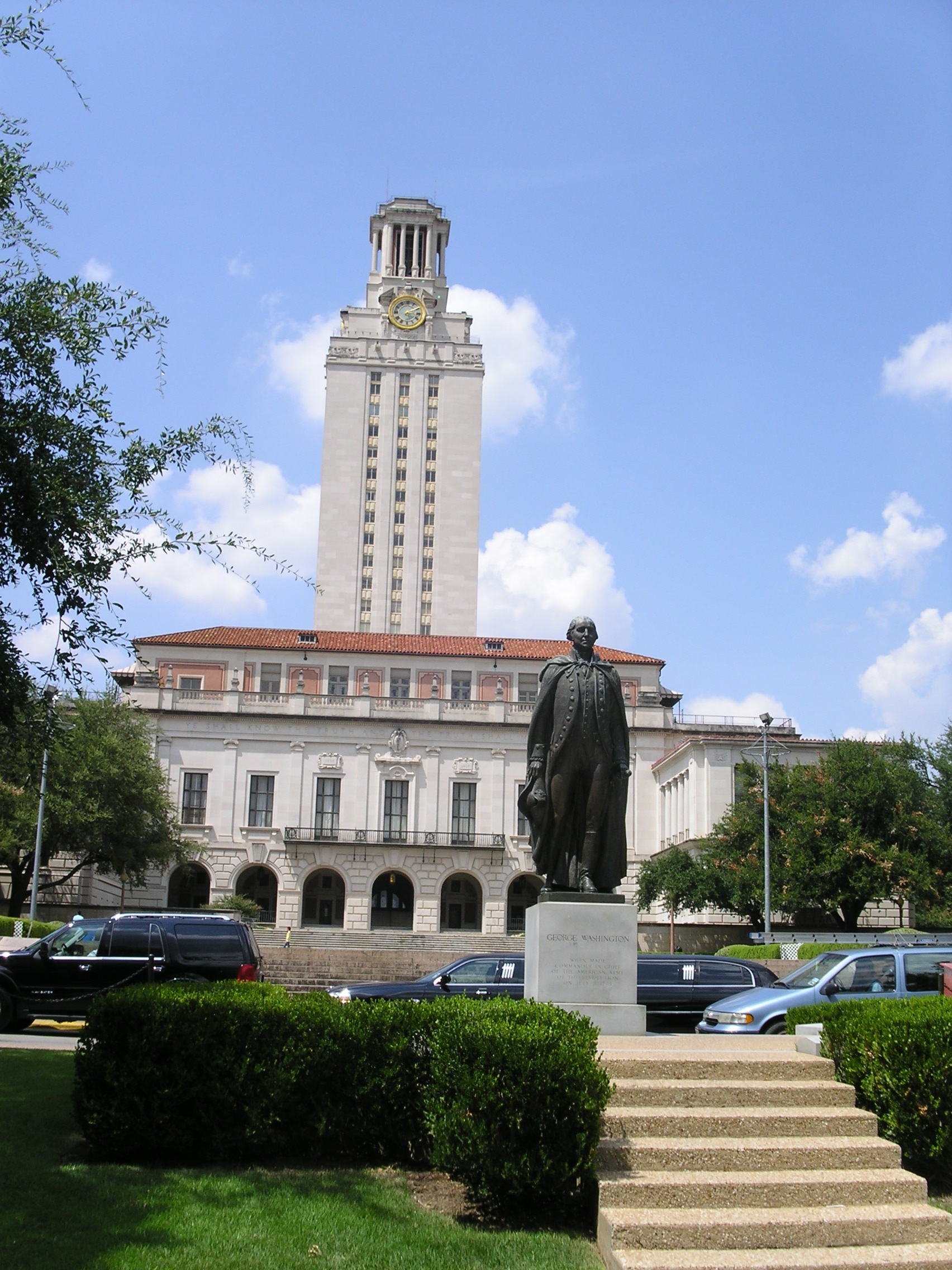
George Washington (1955), University of Texas at Austin

By 1910, Coppini was assisted by sculptor Waldine Tauch, who had been born in Schulenburg, Texas. Tauch became more-or-less his adopted daughter, student and protégée, and he, after extracting a promise from her that she would never marry, molded her into a devotee of classical sculpture. She collaborated with Coppini until his death.

The William P. Rogers chapter of the United Daughters of the Confederacy raised $5,000 in 1911 and commissioned Coppini to design and erect the 1912 Confederate soldier memorial statue named Last Stand, a.k.a. Firing Line, in De Leon Plaza, hiring Otto Zirkel of near the San Antonio studio to build the stone portion of the monument.

He sculpted three distinct statues of George Washington. The first, commissioned by Americans living in Mexico to commemorate the 1910 centennial of Mexican Independence, was installed in 1912 in the Plaza Dinamarca (renamed Plaza Washington) of the Colonia Juárez section of Mexico City. The Mexican Civil War was just beginning. Two years later, in reaction to the April 1914 United States invasion of Veracruz, the statue was toppled from its pedestal and dragged through the streets. The second statue was created to commemorate the 1926 sesquicentennial of the Declaration of Independence. It was installed in 1927 in Portland, Oregon. The third statue was commissioned by the Texas Society, Daughters of the American Revolution to commemorate the 1932 bicentennial of Washington's birth. Fund-raising problems delayed the project for years, and it was installed in February 1955 on the campus of the University of Texas at Austin.

In 1931, Italy decorated Coppini with the Commendatore of the Order of the Crown of Italy for his contribution to art in America. The Texas Centennial Committee awarded Coppini the 1934 commission to design the Texas Centennial half dollar. In 1937, Coppini opened his San Antonio studio on Melrose Place, in order to work on what would become the Spirit of Sacrifice (a.k.a. The Cenotaph) at Alamo Plaza. Baylor University awarded Coppini an honorary doctor of fine arts degree in 1941. From 1943 to 1945 he was head of the art department of Trinity University in San Antonio. In 1945 he and Tauch co-founded the Classic Arts Fraternity in San Antonio (renamed Coppini Academy of Fine Arts in 1950).

Many of his works are in Austin, Texas, displayed on the grounds of the Texas State Capitol and on the campus of The University of Texas. Coppini's statue of Lawrence Sullivan Ross, Texas Governor and third president of Texas A&M University is considered one of the most revered works on the A&M campus in College Station and students often place coins at the statue's feet for good luck on exams. Coppini's marble statue of Senator James Paul Clarke stands in the U.S. Capitol. Coppini also designed two bronze sculptures at Baylor University in Waco, Texas—those of former Baylor University President Rufus C. Burleson, located on the Burleson Quadrangle on the Baylor campus (1905), and Baylor University namesake and founder Judge R.E.B. Baylor (1939). One of Coppini's best works, as stated by the artist, is the bronze sculpture of John Reagan, former U.S. Senator from Palestine, Texas, located in that city's Reagan Park (1911), featuring the personification of the "Lost Cause of the Confederacy" seated at the base of the monument.

Coppini died in San Antonio on 26 September 1957. He designed his own crypt in Sunset Memorial Park.

== Selected works ==
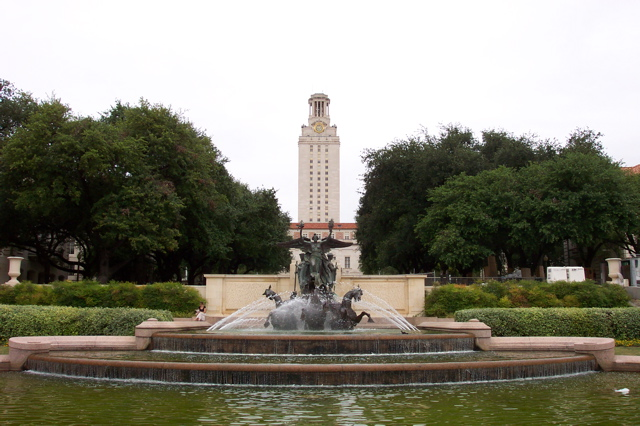
Littlefield Memorial Fountain (1920–1928), University of Texas at Austin

- Jefferson Davis (1901–1903), Confederate Monument, Texas State Capitol, Austin, Texas.
- Confederate Monument (1903), Paris, Texas:
  - Bust of Jefferson Davis.
  - Bust of Robert E. Lee.
  - Bust of Stonewall Jackson.
  - Bust of Albert Sidney Johnston.
- Rufus C. Burleson (1903), Burleson Quadrangle, Baylor University, Waco, Texas.
- The Victims of the Galveston Flood (1903–04), University of Texas at Austin.
- Terry's Texas Rangers Monument (1905–1907), Texas State Capitol, Austin, Texas.
- Hood's Texas Brigade Monument (1910), Texas State Capitol, Austin.
- Come and Take It Monument (1910), Gonzales, Texas.
- Sam Houston Grave Monument (1910–11), Oakwood Cemetery, Huntsville, Texas.
- John Hunt Morgan Memorial (1911), (former) Fayette County Courthouse, Lexington, Kentucky.
- John H. Reagan Memorial (1911), Palestine, Texas.
- Bust of Thomas Mitchell Campbell, Governor of Texas 1907-1911, (1911), Private Collection, Palestine, Texas
- Statue of George Washington (1911–12), Mexico City, Mexico.
- Confederate Monument (1911–12), De Leon Plaza, Victoria, Texas.
- Queen of the Sea monument (1914), Corpus Christi, Texas
- Bust of William Rufus Shafter, (1919), Galesburg, Michigan,
- Lawrence Sullivan Ross (1917–1919), Texas A&M University, College Station, Texas.
- The Spirit of the Texas Cowboy (1918–19), Charles H. Noyes Memorial, Ballinger, Texas.
- George W. Littlefield Commission (1920–1928), University of Texas at Austin:
  - Littlefield WWII Memorial Fountain, Paul Cret, architect.
  - John H. Reagan.
  - Robert E. Lee.
  - Albert Sidney Johnston.
  - James Stephen Hogg.
  - Jefferson Davis.
  - Woodrow Wilson.
- Senator James Paul Clark of Arkansas (1921), National Statuary Hall Collection, United States Capitol, Washington, D.C.
- Bronze doors (1926), Scottish Rite Cathedral (Masonic), San Antonio, Texas.
- Statue of George Washington (1926–27), Friendship Masonic Lodge 160, Portland, Oregon.
- Texas Centennial half dollar (1934-38)
- Texas State Fair Hall of State (1935–36), Fair Park, Dallas, Texas:
  - Stephen F. Austin.
  - Thomas J. Rusk.
  - William B. Travis.
  - James W. Fannin.
  - Mirabeau B. Lamar.
  - Sam Houston.
- Cenotaph to the Heroes of the Alamo (1937–38), Alamo Plaza, San Antonio, Texas.
- Coppini Tomb (1953), Sunset Memorial Park, San Antonio, Texas.
- Statue of George Washington (1955), University of Texas at Austin.
- Bust of J. Frank Norris (date unknown), Arlington Baptist University/World Baptist Fellowship headequarters, Arlington, Texas.

== Gallery ==
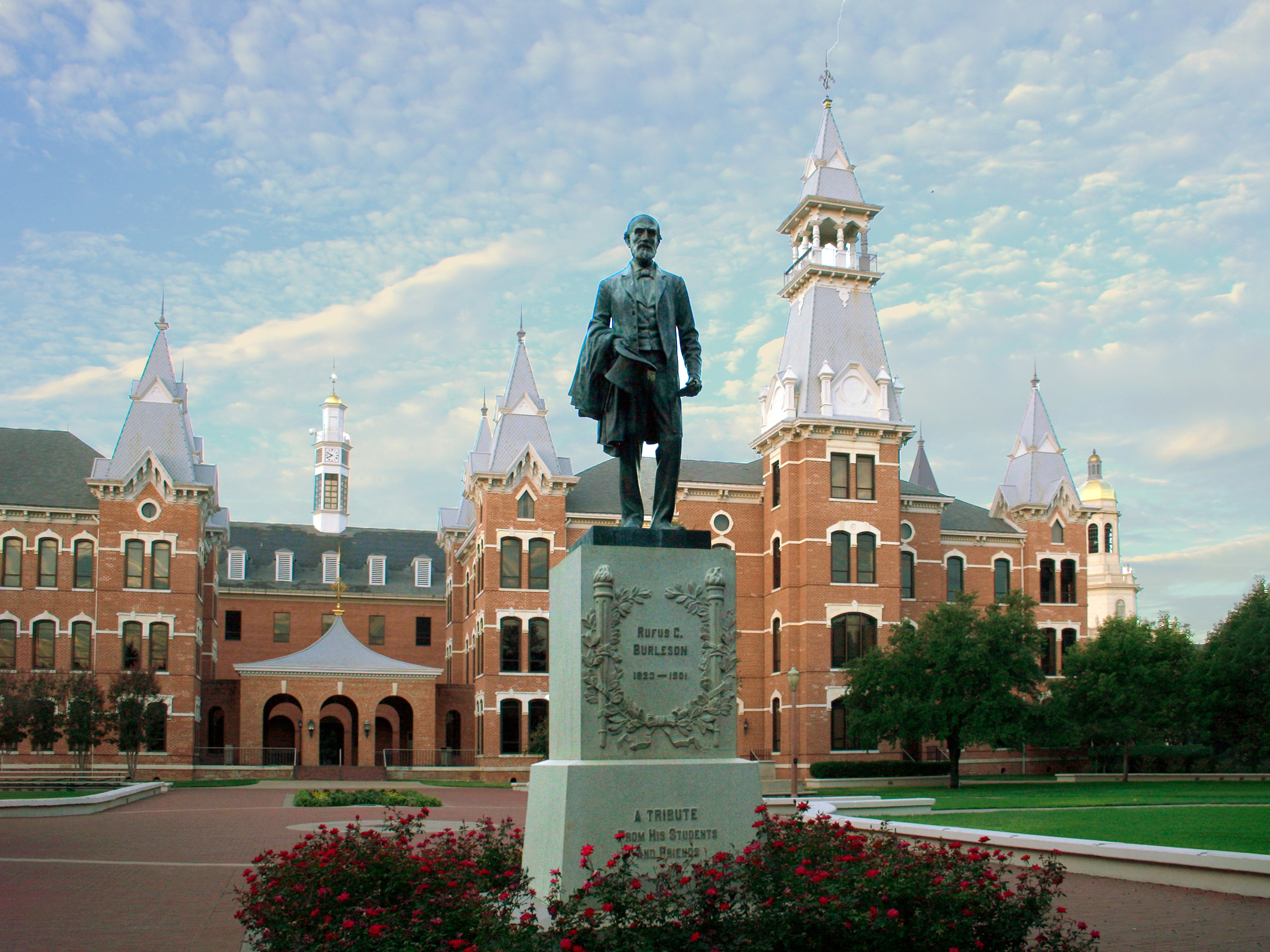
Rufus Burleson (1903), Baylor University, Waco, Texas

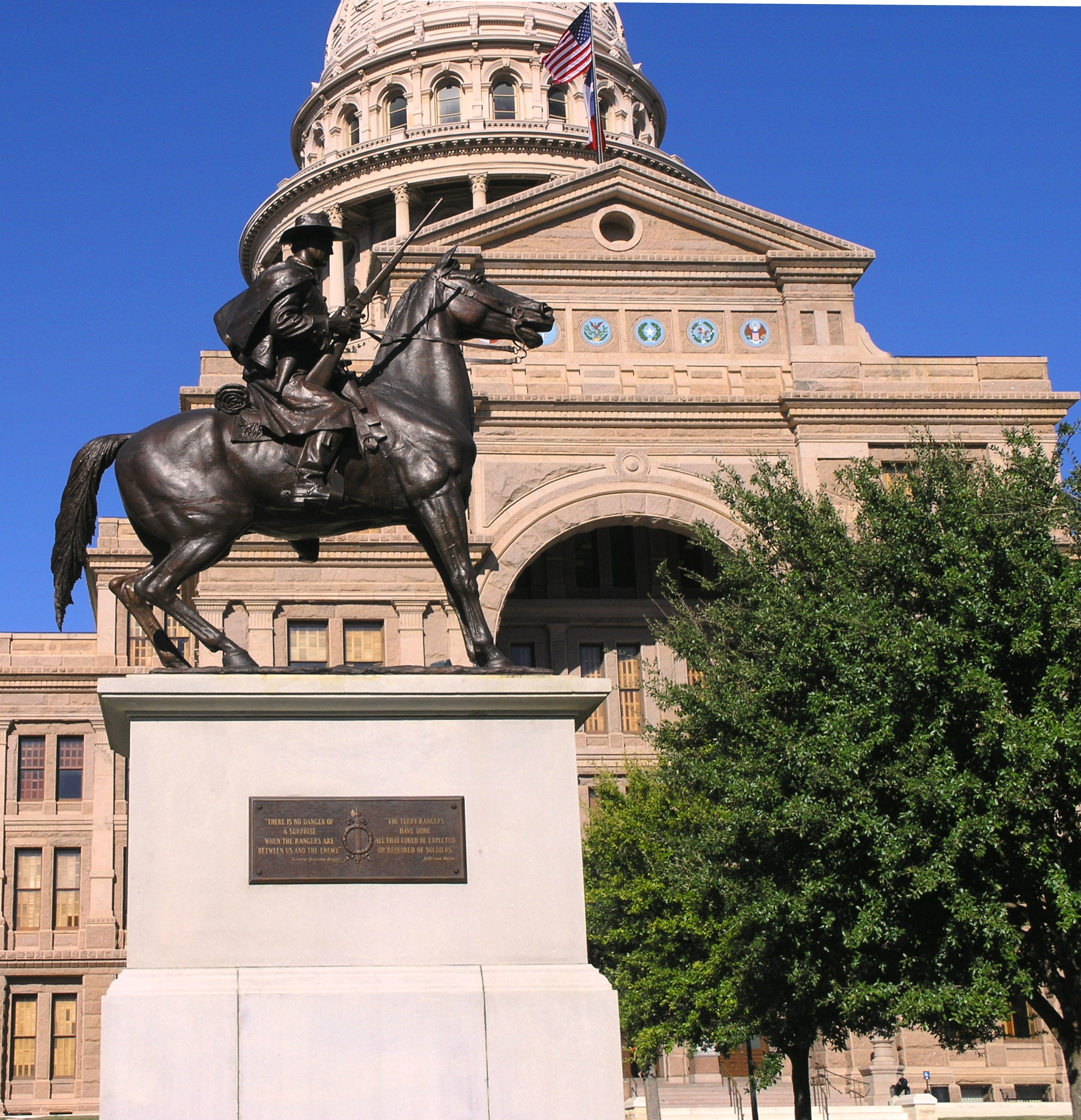
Terry's Texas Rangers Monument (1905–1907), Texas State Capitol

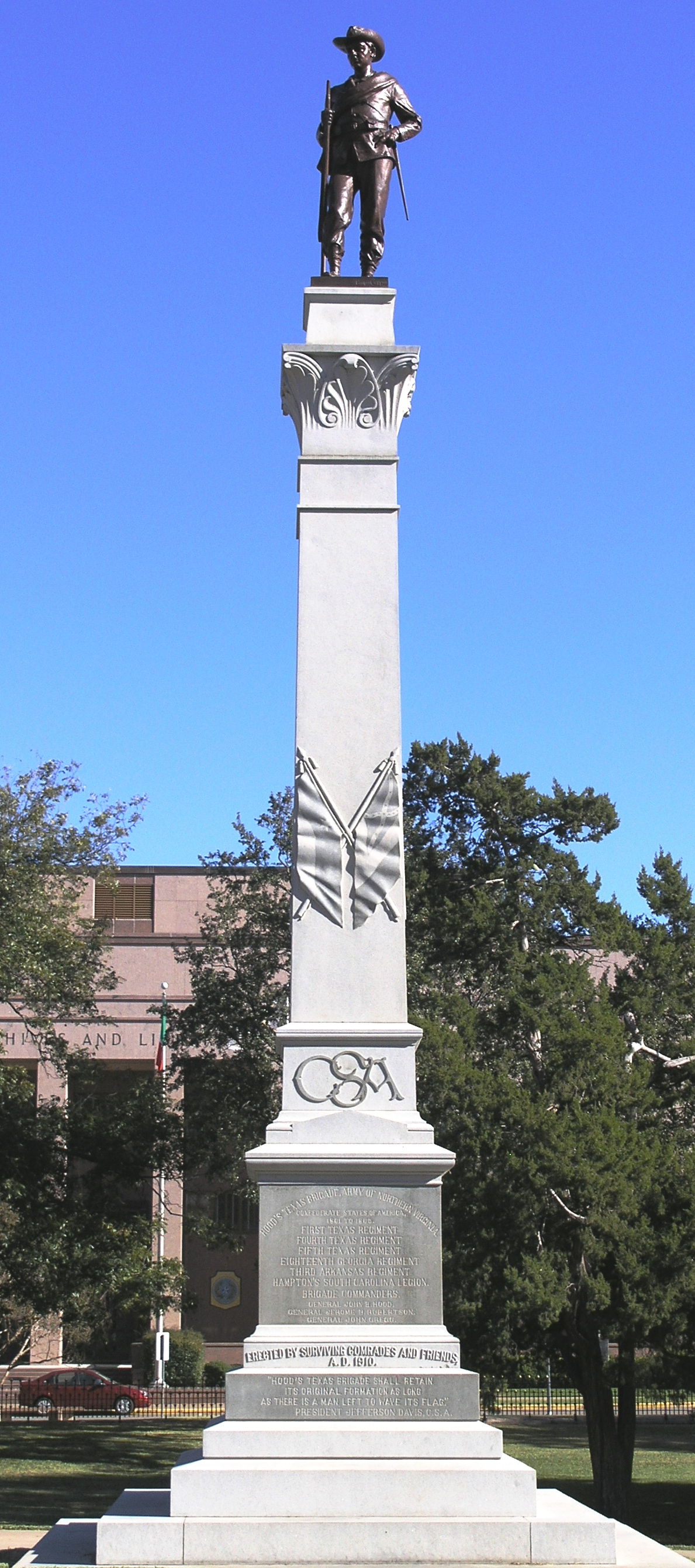
Hood's Texas Brigade Monument (1910), Texas State Capitol

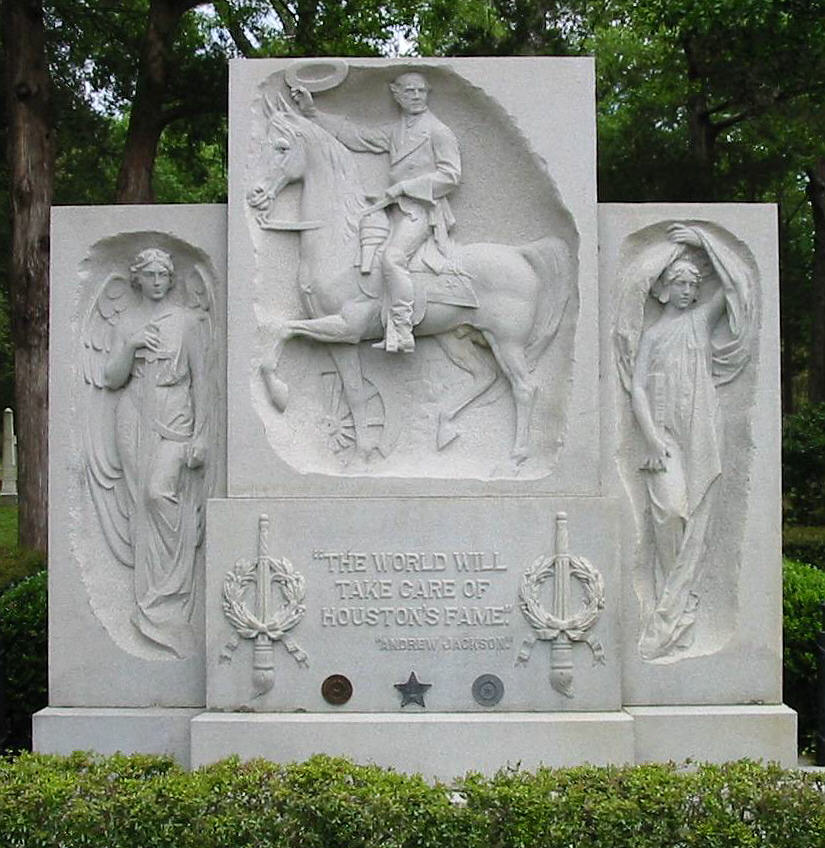
Sam Houston Grave Monument (1910–11), Huntsville, Texas

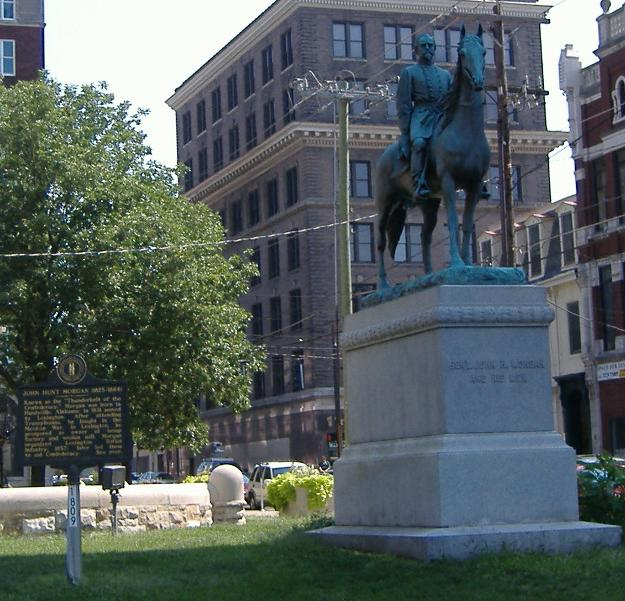
John Hunt Morgan Memorial (1911), Lexington, Kentucky

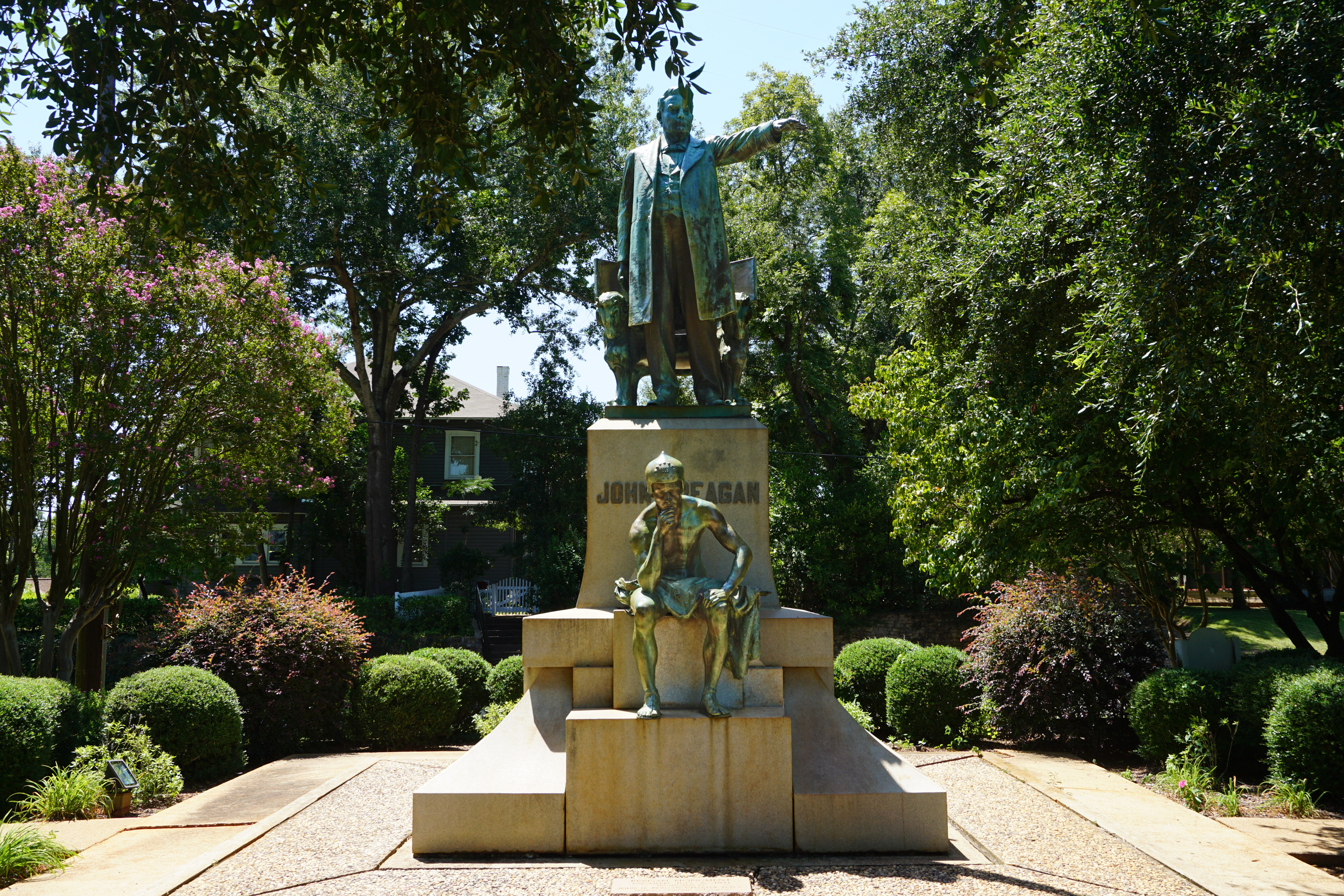
John H. Reagan Monument (1911), Palestine, Texas

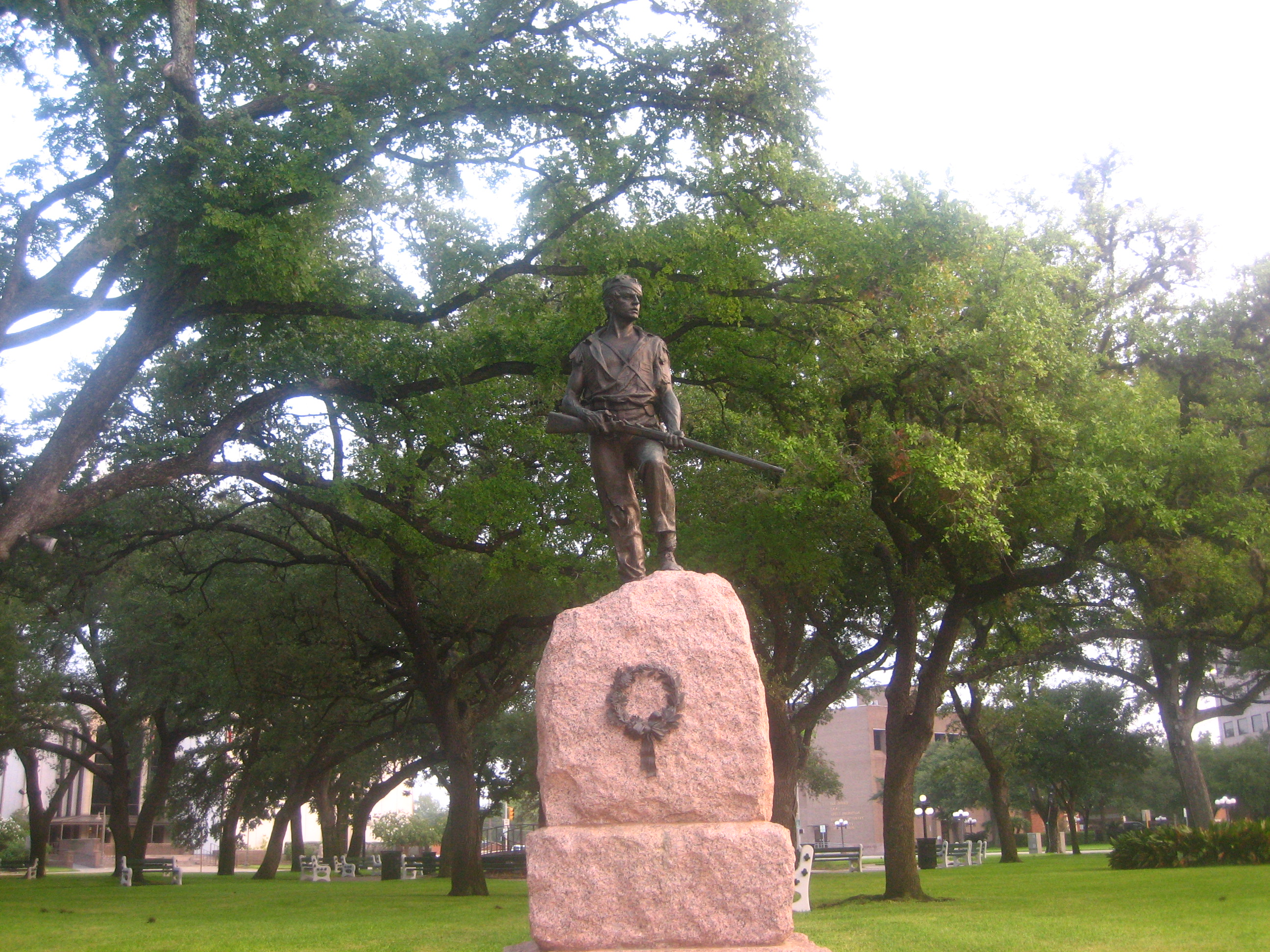
Confederate Monument (1911–12), Victoria, Texas

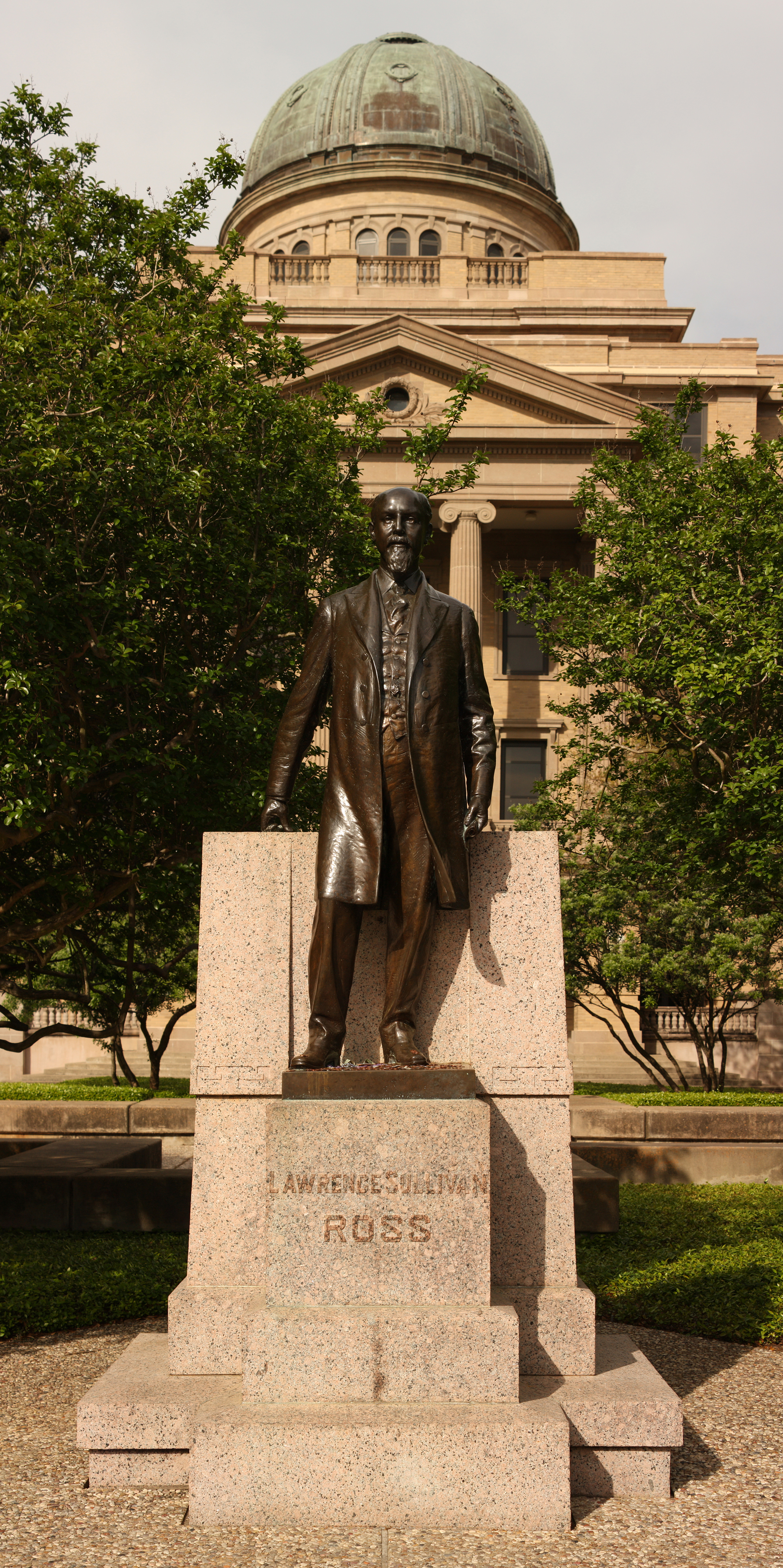
Lawrence Sullivan Ross (1917–19), Texas A&M University

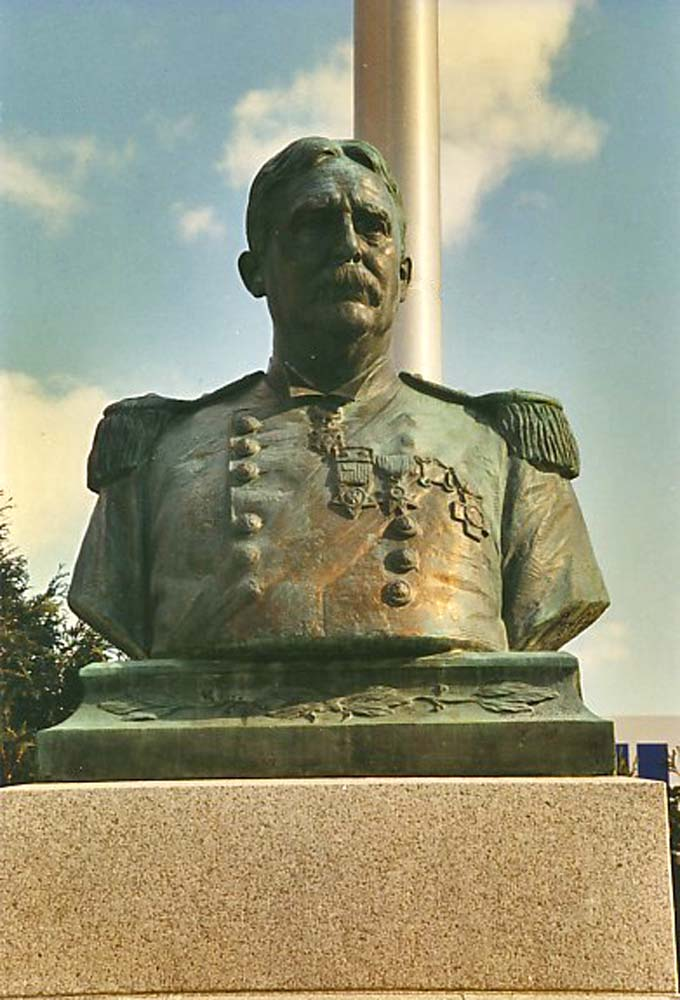
General William Rufus Shafter (1919), Galesburg, Michigan

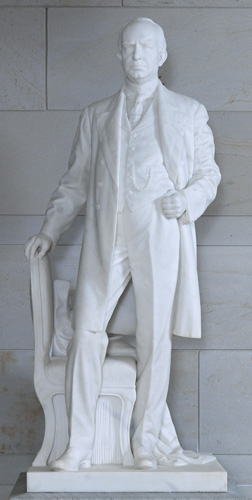
James Paul Clark (1921), United States Capitol, Washington, DC

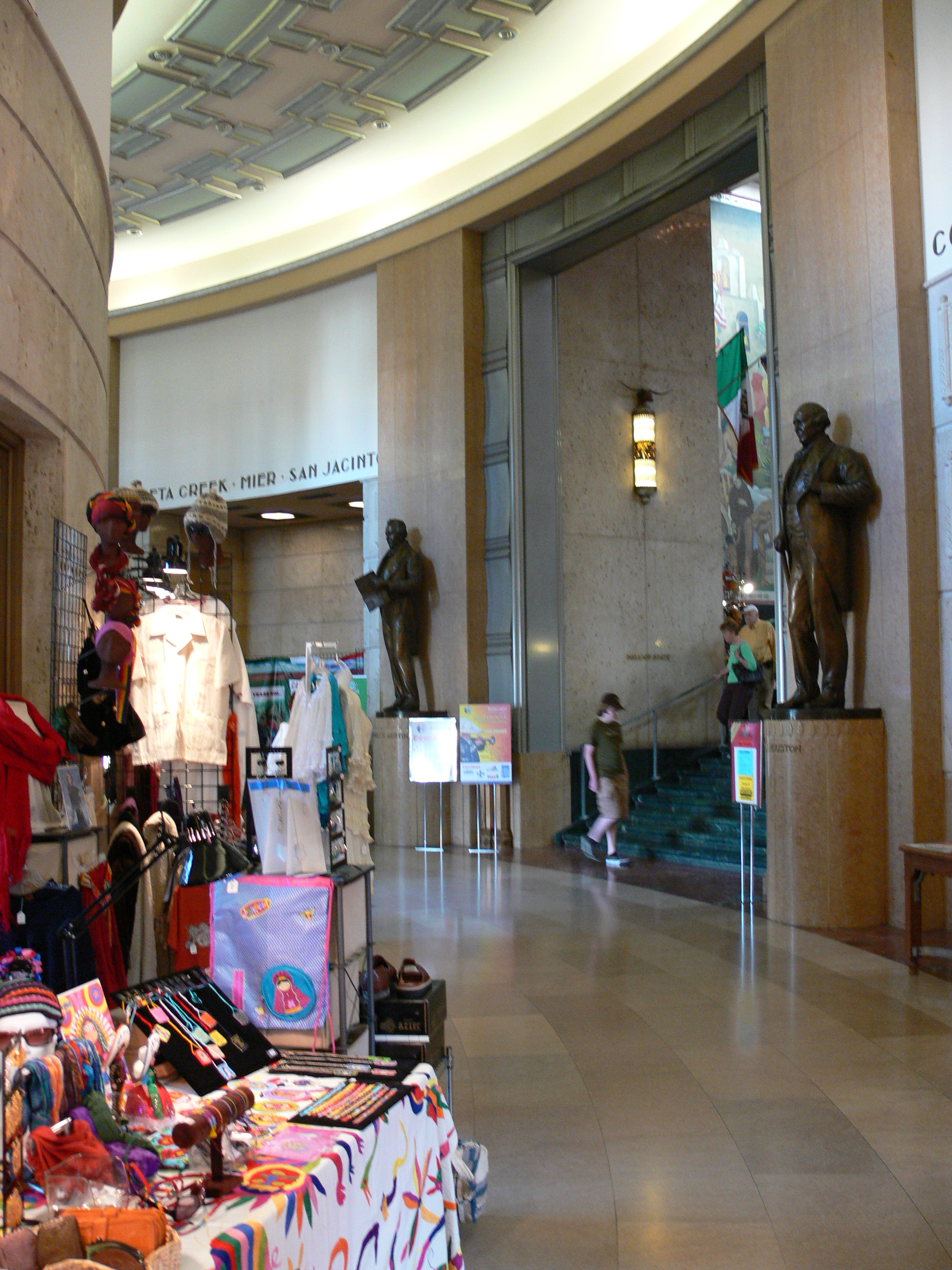
Stephen F. Austin and Sam Houston (1935–36), Hall of State, Dallas, Texas

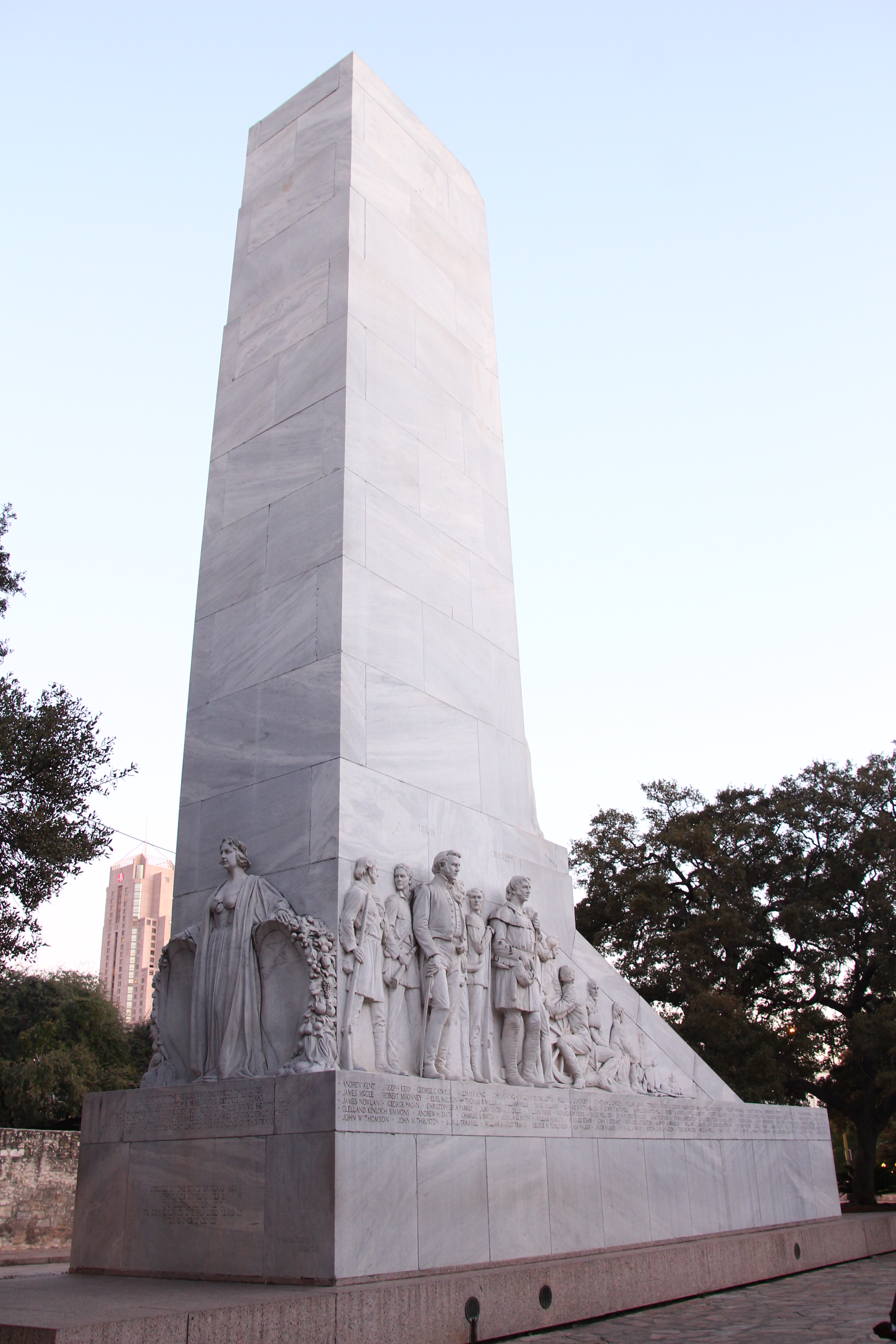
Alamo Cenotaph (1937–38), San Antonio, Texas
