= Omri Nave =

Israeli footballer

Omri Nave עומרי נוה
Personal information
- Full name: Omri Nave
- Date of birth: November 26, 1988 (age 37)
- Place of birth: Ramat Gan, Israel
- Position: Center back

Youth career
- Maccabi Netanya

Senior career*
Years	Team	Apps	(Gls)
2007–2008	Maccabi Netanya	0	(0)
2008–2009	Sektzia Ness Ziona	0	(0)
2009–2011	Hapoel Herzliya	31	(2)
2011	Hakoah Amidar Ramat Gan	6	(0)
2011–2012	Hapoel Katamon Jerusalem	27	(0)
2012–2013	Maccabi Ironi Amishav Petah Tikva	20	(0)
2013	Maccabi Kiryat Malakhi	6	(0)
2013–2014	Beitar Kfar Saba	7	(0)
2014	Maccabi Ironi Amishav Petah Tikva	14	(1)
2014–2015	F.C. Kafr Qasim	22	(0)
2015–2016	Beitar Kfar Saba	8	(0)
2016	Hakoah Amidar Ramat Gan	12	(0)
2016	Maccabi Jaffa	2	(0)
2016–2017	Ihud Bnei Kaff Qara	14	(3)
- * Club domestic league appearances and goals

Omri Nave (Hebrew: עומרי נוה; born November 26, 1988) is a former Israeli footballer who plays for Ihud Bnei Kafr Qara.

== Honours ==
- Liga Alef (South) (1):
  - 2009-10
