= Texas State Preservation Board =

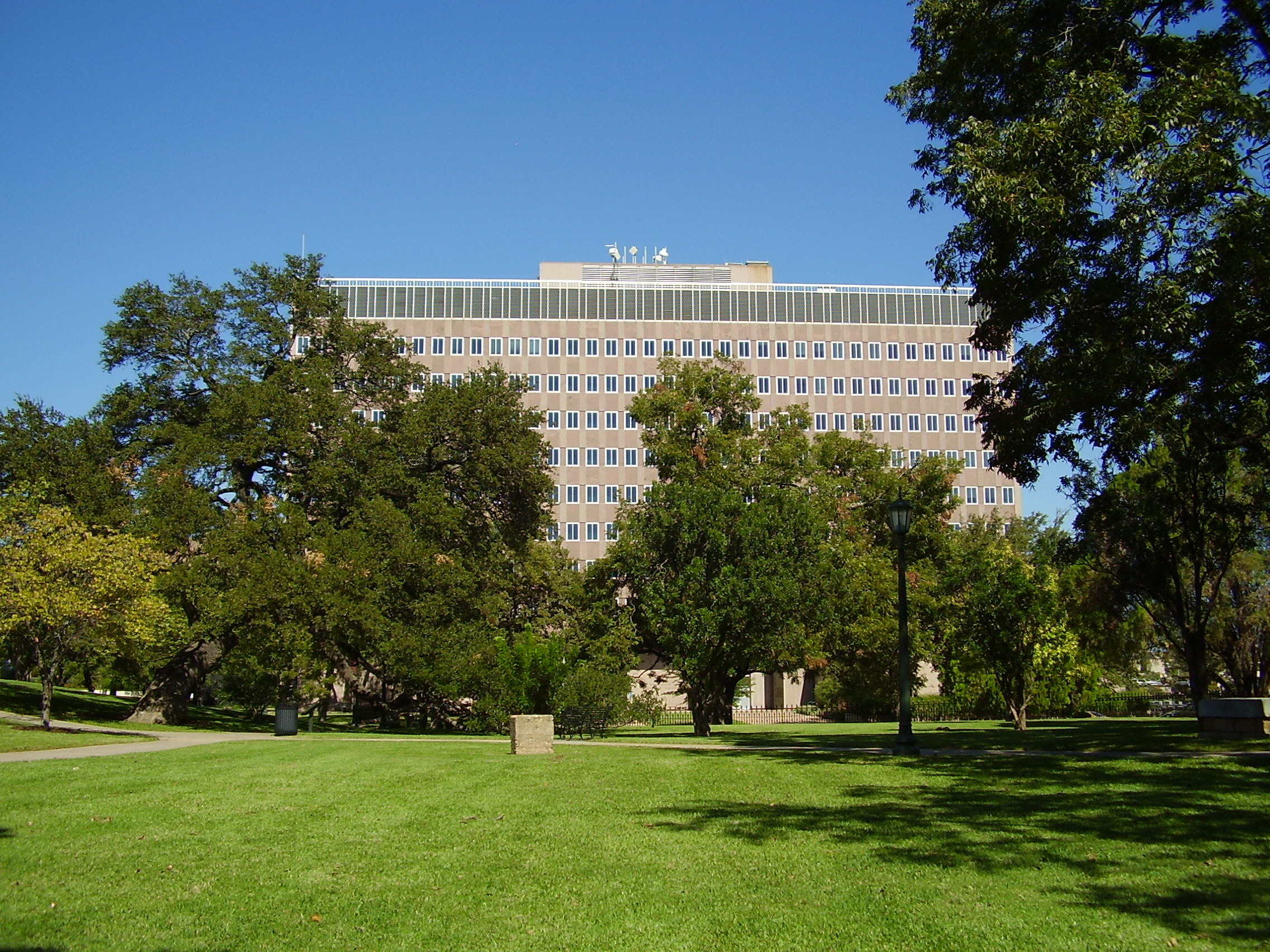
The Sam Houston State Office Building includes the offices of the Texas State Preservation Board

The Texas State Preservation Board is a state agency that maintains the Texas Capitol, the General Land Office Building (now the Texas Capitol Visitor Center), and the Bob Bullock Texas State History Museum. It has its headquarters in the Sam Houston State Office Building in Downtown Austin.

The 68th Legislature of Texas established the board in 1983 to preserve the capitol.
