= Littlefield Fountain =

Fountain and sculpture in Texas, US

- Littlefield Fountain in front of the Main Building Tower
- Artist: Pompeo Coppini (sculptor); Paul Philippe Cret (architect)
- Completion date: April 29, 1933
- Type: Memorial fountain and sculpture
- Medium: Sculpture: bronze Fountain: granite Fountain wall: limestone
- Location: Austin, Texas; 30°17′02″N 97°44′23″W
- Owner: University of Texas at Austin

Littlefield Fountain (also known as the Littlefield Memorial Gateway) is a World War I memorial monument designed by Italian-born sculptor Pompeo Coppini on the main campus of the University of Texas at Austin in Austin, Texas, at the entrance to the university's South Mall. Completed in 1933, the monument is named after university regent and benefactor George W. Littlefield, whose donation paid for its design and construction.

== History ==
In 1916 Major George W. Littlefield, a former regent of the University of Texas at Austin and major benefactor to its development, proposed the construction of a memorial arch over the university's southern entrance that would honor the Confederate dead from the Civil War. In 1919 Littlefield contacted San Antonio-based Italian-born sculptor Pompeo Coppini, requesting a design that would include images of notable figures from the history of Texas and the American South, and proposing to fund the project with a donation of $200,000 (equivalent to $4,000,000 in 2025).

Coppini developed a design featuring a 40-foot (12 m) blind arch framing statues of six Confederate figures behind a pool and fountains, but he warned Littlefield that the project would require a larger budget, even after Littlefield agreed to increase his donation to $250,000. On April 15, 1920, Coppini presented university officials with a new, cheaper design that eliminated the arch and expanded the fountain pool to hold a large allegorical sculpture. Coppini also persuaded Littlefield to dedicate the monument to the students and alumni who had died in the Great War (now known as World War I), arguing that a Confederate memorial would only prolong the lingering resentments from the Civil War.

Littlefield died in November 1920, and Coppini spent most of the next decade developing the sculptures that he intended for the memorial. The project was impeded by cost overruns and delays, including a labor strike by Coppini's bronze workers. The six human figures were completed in 1925 and temporarily displayed in the Texas State Capitol, and the central sculpture was completed in 1928. Construction of the fountain was begun in the fall of 1932, with its plan somewhat altered by campus architect Paul Philippe Cret and the six statues relocated to the adjoining South Mall. The memorial was dedicated on April 29, 1933, and the water was turned on that March.

=== Statue and inscription controversy and removals ===
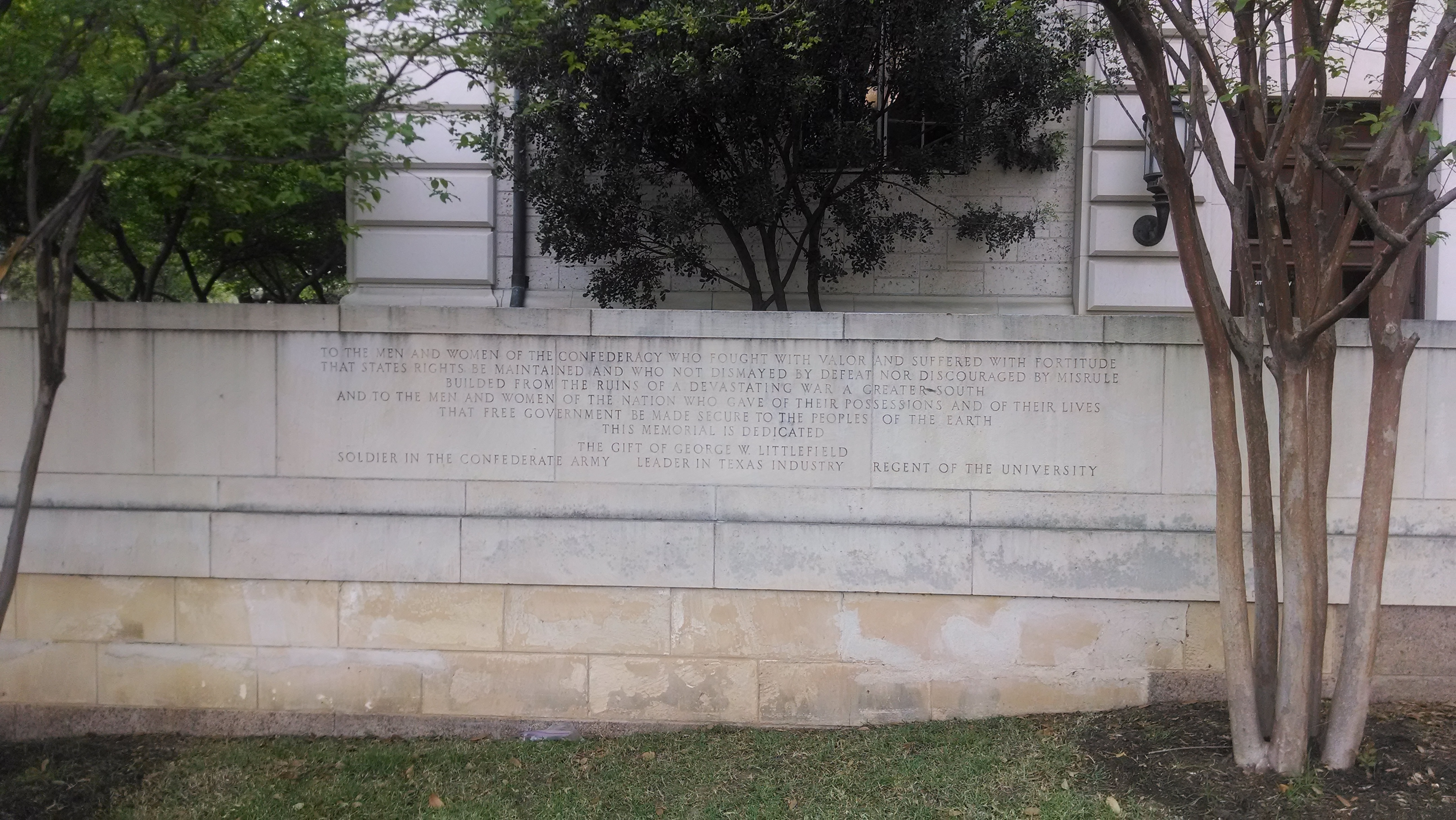
The now-removed inscription on the west wall of the fountain complex

The Littlefield Fountain's function as a memorial to the Confederacy drew criticism even when it was first proposed in the early twentieth century. After the fountain's installation, the statues of Confederate notables along the university's South Mall that Coppini had designed for the fountain attracted controversy, as did a dedication inscribed on a wall along the west edge of the fountain complex, which honored the Confederate cause along with American participation in World War I. In 2004 university President Larry Faulkner wrote a letter recommending that the six Coppini statues be moved up to the edges of the fountain and supplemented by a plaque that would explain the symbolism intended by the artist and provide historical context for the figures, but no such steps were taken during his tenure.

Beginning in 2015 and accelerating in 2017, a national controversy grew over the prominent positions of monuments to the Confederacy in many public spaces across the United States, and particularly in the American South. In March 2015 UT's student government passed a resolution calling for the removal of Coppini's statue of Jefferson Davis from the South Mall. That August the university removed the statues of both Davis and Woodrow Wilson from the Mall and placed them in storage, despite a lawsuit from the Texas Division of the Sons of Confederate Veterans, which failed to persuade the Texas Supreme Court to block the plan. Davis's statue was later relocated to the university's Dolph Briscoe Center for American History, where it has been displayed since 2017.

In July 2016 the university removed the stone panels bearing the dedication inscription from the fountain complex and stored them, possibly for future display at the Briscoe Center. On August 20, 2017, in the aftermath of the Unite the Right rally in Charlottesville, Virginia, the university removed the remaining four Coppini statues of Confederate notables from the South Mall.

== Design ==
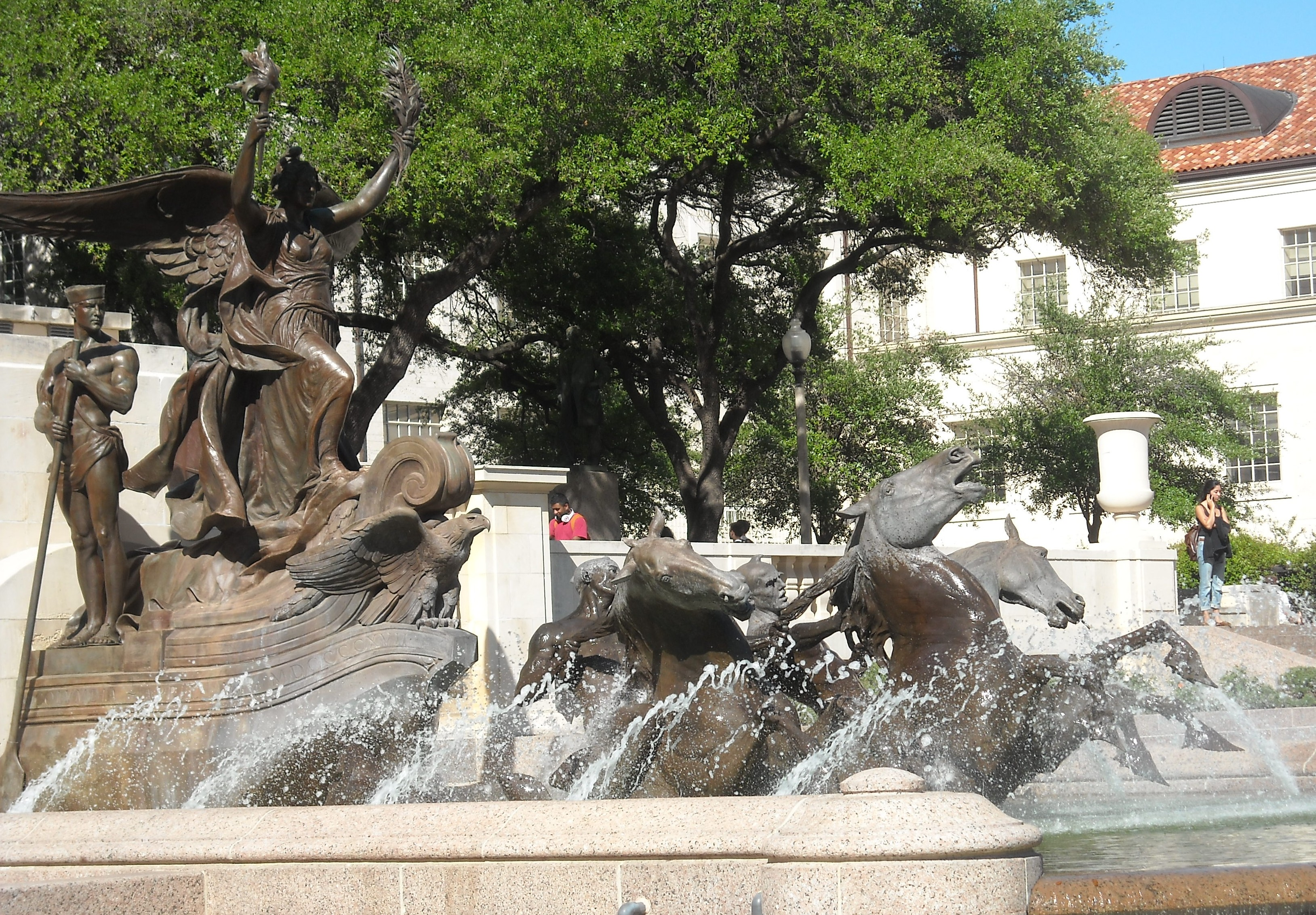
Detail of the bronze sculpture in Littlefield Fountain

The memorial consists of a fountain set in a three-tiered semicircular granite pool, with a large bronze sculpture rising above the water, backed by a limestone wall. Two rows of fountain nozzles run from front to back in the top tier along the sides of the central sculpture, spraying diagonal jets of water onto the sculpture's base.

The sculpture depicts the prow of a ship emerging from the stone wall behind it, with an eagle perched on its tip. The ship bears the winged figure of Columbia, who holds two raised torches and is flanked by the figures of a soldier and a sailor. Ahead of the ship are three hippocamps, partially submerged in the pool, two of which are mounted by mermen. The group represents American armed forces sailing overseas to defend democracy in the Great War, surrounded by symbols of American strength and unity.

The limestone wall behind the fountain bears two bronze plaques. One is inscribed "THESE SONS AND DAUGHTERS OF THE UNIVERSITY OF TEXAS GAVE THEIR LIVES TO THEIR COUNTRY IN THE WORLD WAR," followed by two columns of names listing all UT students and alumni killed in the Great War; the other reads "BREVIS A NATVRA NOBIS VITA DATA EST AT MEMORIA BENE REDDITAE VITAE SEMPITERNA" (Latin: "A short life hath been given by Nature unto man; but the remembrance of a life laid down in a good cause endureth forever").

=== Changes to Coppini's design ===
In Coppini's original design, the fountain was to be backed by a pair of 37-foot (11 m) stone obelisks, representing the Confederacy and the Union. In front of the Confederacy's pylon he intended to place a statue of Jefferson Davis, faced on the Union's side by one of Woodrow Wilson. Coppini meant to present the men as two "war presidents," one governing the Confederacy through the Civil War, the other leading America through the Great War, with their juxtaposition symbolizing the reunification of the United States after the divisions of the Civil War. Littlefield also selected Confederate generals Robert E. Lee and Albert Sidney Johnston, Confederate postmaster general John Reagan, and Texas governor Jim Hogg to be depicted in bronze statues which would flank the fountain, representing historical figures of Texas and the South.

However, in the late 1920s the university regents decided to remove the obelisks from the plan, in part to reduce the memorial's cost (which had overrun Littlefield's donation), and in part to preserve the view of the university's Main Building along the South Mall. In 1930 the university's campus architect, Paul Philippe Cret, decided that the six bronze statues Coppini had meant to surround the fountain would instead be installed at various points along the South Mall, asserting that the figures would appear too crowded in the small space around the memorial. These alterations were vehemently opposed by Coppini, who felt that the omission of the obelisks ruined the symbolism he had intended, and that the disarrangement of the statues reduced them to mere decorations.
