= Removal of Confederate monuments and memorials =

Ongoing development in the United States

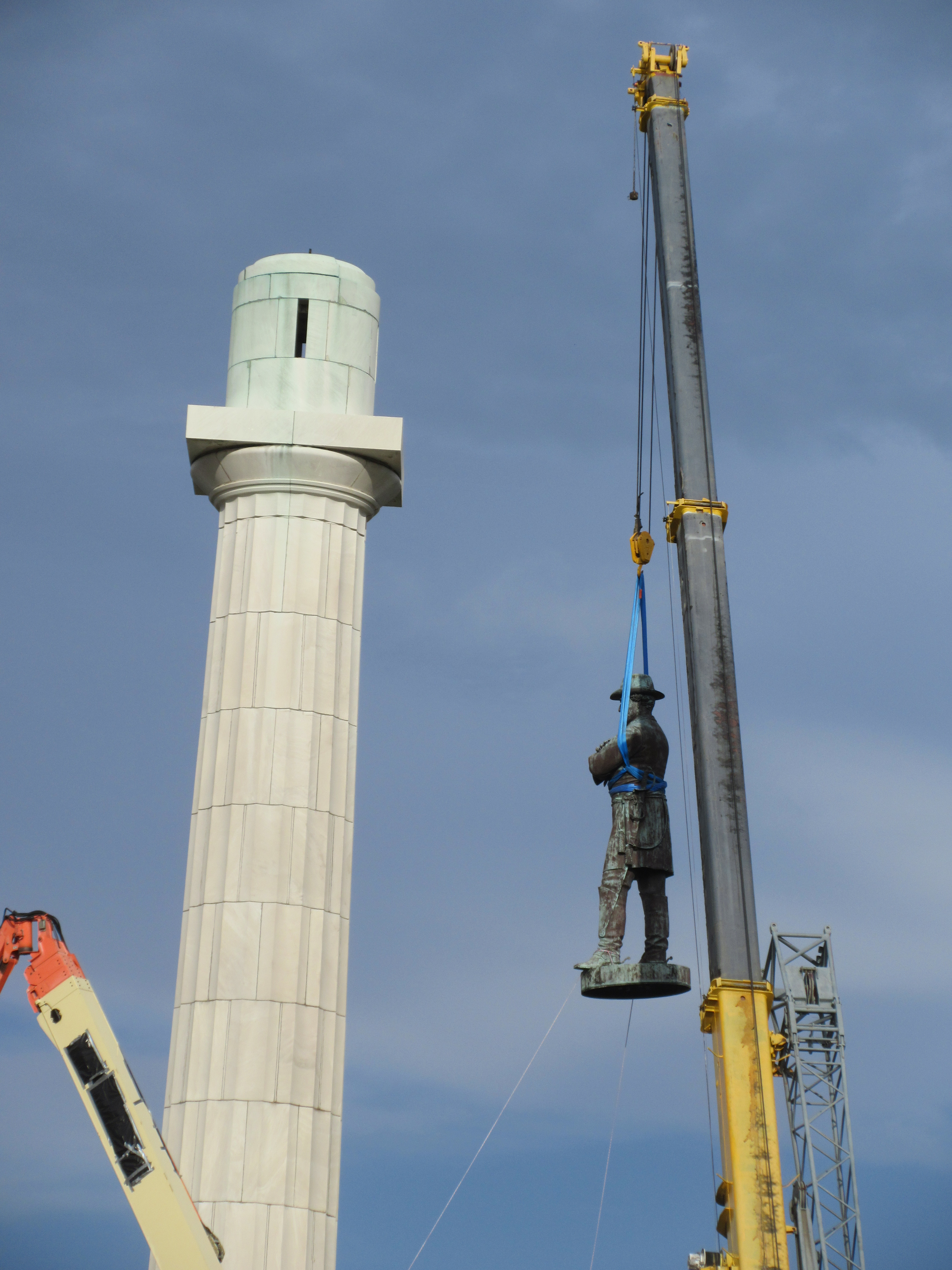
The Robert E. Lee monument in New Orleans being taken down on May 19, 2017.

More than 160 Confederate monuments and memorials to the Confederate States of America (CSA; the Confederacy) and associated figures have been removed from public spaces in the United States, all but three of them since 2015. Some have been removed by state and local governments; others have been torn down by protestors.

Over seven hundred monuments and memorials have been created on public land, the vast majority in the South during the era of Jim Crow laws from 1877 to 1964. Efforts to remove them began after the Charleston church shooting and later increased after the Unite the Right rally and the murder of George Floyd.

Most modern historical analyses agree that the monuments largely were not built as memorials or for historical preservation; instead, they were built to intimidate African Americans and reaffirm white supremacy after the Civil War; and that they memorialize an unrecognized, treasonous government, the Confederacy, whose founding principle was the perpetuation and expansion of slavery. The presence of these memorials more than a hundred years after the defeat of the Confederacy would continue to disenfranchise and alienate African Americans.

According to The Washington Post, five Confederate monuments were removed after the Civil War, eight in the two years after the Charleston shooting, 48 in the three years after the Unite the Right rally, and 110 in the two years after George Floyd's murder. In 2022, Defense Secretary Lloyd Austin said he would order the renaming of U.S. military bases which are named after Confederate generals, as well as the renaming of other Defense Department property that honors Confederates. The result was the Defense Department's Naming Commission of 2021-22.

The campaign to remove monuments has been extended beyond the United States; around the world, many statues and other public works of art which are related to the transatlantic slave trade and European colonialism have been removed or destroyed.

== Background ==
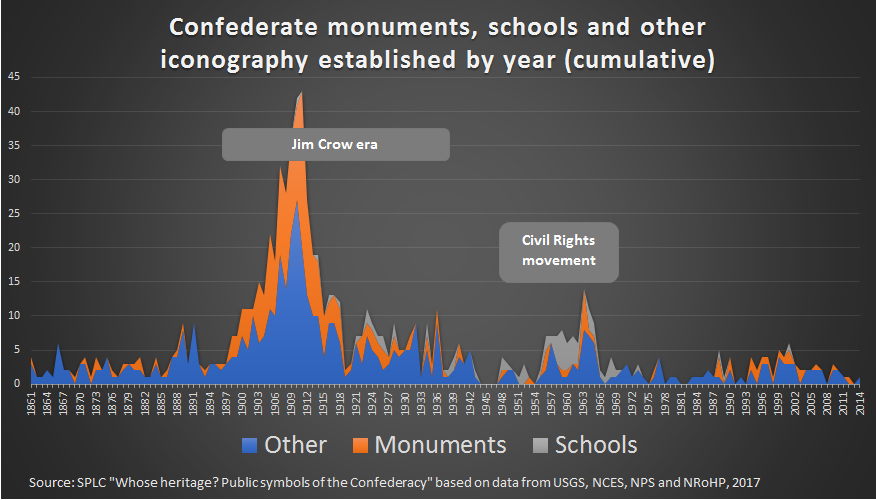
Chart of public symbols of the Confederacy and its leaders as surveyed by the Southern Poverty Law Center, by year of establishment (Note: This chart is based on data from an SPLC survey which identified "1,503 publicly sponsored symbols honoring Confederate leaders, soldiers or the Confederate States of America in general". The survey excluded "nearly 2,600 markers, battlefields, museums, cemeteries and other places or symbols that are largely historical in nature".)

Most of the Confederate monuments on public land were built during periods of racial conflict, such as the period when Jim Crow laws were being passed during the late 19th century as well as at the start of the 20th century or the period of the civil rights movement of the 1950s and 1960s. (Note: Graham (2016) "Many of the treasured monuments that seem to offer a connection to the post-bellum South are actually much later, anachronistic constructions, and they tend to correlate closely with periods of fraught racial relations".) (Note: Graham (2016): "A timeline of the genesis of the Confederate sites shows two notable spikes. One comes around the turn of the 20th century, just after Plessy v. Ferguson, and just as many Southern states were establishing repressive race laws. The second runs from the mid-1950s to the mid-1960s—the peak of the civil-rights movement.") These two periods also coincided with the 50th and 100th year after the end of the Civil War, including the American Civil War Centennial. The peak in construction of Civil War monuments occurred between the late 1890s up to 1920, with a second smaller peak in the late-1950s to mid-1960s.

== Academic commentary ==
In an August 2017 statement on the monuments controversy, the American Historical Association (AHA) said that to remove a monument "is not to erase history, but rather to alter or call attention to a previous interpretation of history". The AHA said that most monuments were erected "without anything resembling a democratic process", and recommended that it was "time to reconsider these decisions". Most Confederate monuments were erected during the late-nineteenth and early-twentieth century, and this undertaking was "part and parcel of the initiation of legally mandated segregation and widespread disenfranchisement across the South". Memorials to the Confederacy erected during this period "were intended, in part, to obscure the terrorism required to overthrow Reconstruction, and to intimidate African Americans politically and isolate them from the mainstream of public life". A later wave of monument building coincided with the civil rights movement, and according to the AHA, "these symbols of white supremacy are still being invoked for similar purposes."

Michael J. McAfee, curator of history at the West Point Museum, said, "There are no monuments that mention the name Benedict Arnold. What does this have to do with the Southern monuments honoring the political and military leaders of the Confederacy? They, like Arnold, were traitors. They turned their backs on their nation, their oaths, and the sacrifices of their ancestors in the War for Independence. They attempted to destroy their nation to defend chattel slavery and from a sense that as white men they were innately superior to all other races. They fought for white racial supremacy. That is why monuments glorifying them and their cause should be removed. Leave monuments marking their participation on the battlefields of the war, but tear down those that only commemorate the intolerance, violence, and hate that inspired their attempt to destroy the American nation."

University of Chicago historian Jane Dailey wrote that in many cases the purpose of the monuments was not to celebrate the past but rather to promote a "white supremacist future". Civil War historian Judith Giesberg, professor of history at Villanova University agrees: "White supremacy is really what these statues represent."

Historian Karyn Cox of the University of North Carolina at Charlotte has written that the monuments are "a legacy of the brutally racist Jim Crow era". University of North Carolina at Chapel Hill historian James Leloudis wrote, "The funders and backers of these monuments are very explicit that they are requiring a political education and a legitimacy for the Jim Crow era and the right of white men to rule."

Adam Goodheart, Civil War author and director of the Starr Center at Washington College, told National Geographic, "They're 20th-century artifacts in the sense that a lot of it had to do with a vision of national unity that embraced Southerners as well as Northerners, but importantly still excluded black people." Goodheart said that the statues were meant to be symbols of white supremacy and the rallying around them by white supremacists will likely hasten their demise. Eleanor Harvey, a senior curator at the Smithsonian American Art Museum and a scholar of Civil War history, said, "If white nationalists and neo-Nazis are now claiming this as part of their heritage, they have essentially co-opted those images and those statues beyond any capacity to neutralize them again".

Elijah Anderson, a professor of sociology at Yale University, said the statues' continued existence "really impacts the psyche of black people". Harold Holzer, the director of the Roosevelt House Public Policy Institute at Hunter College, argued that this was intentional: the statues were designed to belittle African Americans. Dell Upton, chair of the Department of Art History at the University of California, Los Angeles, wrote that "the monuments were not intended as public art," but rather were installed "as affirmations that the American polity was a white polity," and that because of their explicitly white supremacist intent, their removal from civic spaces was a matter "of justice, equity, and civic values".

Historians Ethan J. Kytle and Blain Roberts asked:

Why, in the year 2015, should communal spaces in the South continue to be sullied by tributes to those who defended slavery? How can Americans ignore the pain that black citizens, especially, must feel when they walk by the Calhoun Monument or any similar statues, on their way to work, school or Bible study?

In a 1993 book on the issue in Georgia, author Frank McKenney argued otherwise: "These monuments were communal efforts, public art, and social history," he wrote. Ex-soldiers and politicians had difficult time raising funds to erect monuments so the task mostly fell to the women, the "mothers widows, and orphans, the bereaved fiancees and sisters" of the soldiers who had died. Many ladies' memorial associations were formed in the decades following the end of the Civil War, most of them joining the United Daughters of the Confederacy following its inception in 1894. The women were advised to "remember that they were buying art, not metal and stone."

Cheryl Benard, president of the Alliance for the Restoration of Cultural Heritage, argued against the removal of Confederate war monuments in an op-ed written for The National Interest: "From my vantage point, the idea that the way to deal with history is to destroy any relics that remind you of something you don't like, is highly alarming."

Civil War historian James I. Robertson Jr. said that the monuments were not a "Jim Crow signal of defiance". He called the current climate to dismantle or destroy Confederate monuments as an "age of idiocy", motivated by "elements hell-bent on tearing apart unity that generations of Americans have painfully constructed".

But Dell Upton argues that the monuments celebrated only one side of the story, one that was "openly pro-Confederate". The monuments were erected without the consent or even input of Southern African-Americans, who remembered the Civil War far differently, and who had no interest in honoring those who fought to keep them enslaved. Robert Seigler, who documented more than 170 Confederate monuments in South Carolina, found only five dedicated to the African Americans who had been used by the Confederacy to build fortifications or "had served as musicians, teamsters, cooks, servants, and in other capacities". Four of those were to slaves and one to a musician, Henry Brown.

Alfred Brophy, a professor of law at the University of Alabama, argued the removal of the Confederate statues "facilitates forgetting," although these statues were "re-inscribed images of white supremacy". Brophy said that the Lee statue in Charlottesville should be removed.

Julian Hayter, a historian at the University of Richmond, supports a different approach for the statues: re-contextualization. He supports adding a "footnote of epic proportions" such as a prominent historical sign or marker that explains the context in which they were built to help people see old monuments in a new light. "I'm suggesting we use the scale and grandeur of those monuments against themselves. I think we lack imagination when we talk about memorials. It's all or nothin'.... As if there's nothin' in between that we could do to tell a more enriching story about American history."

== History ==
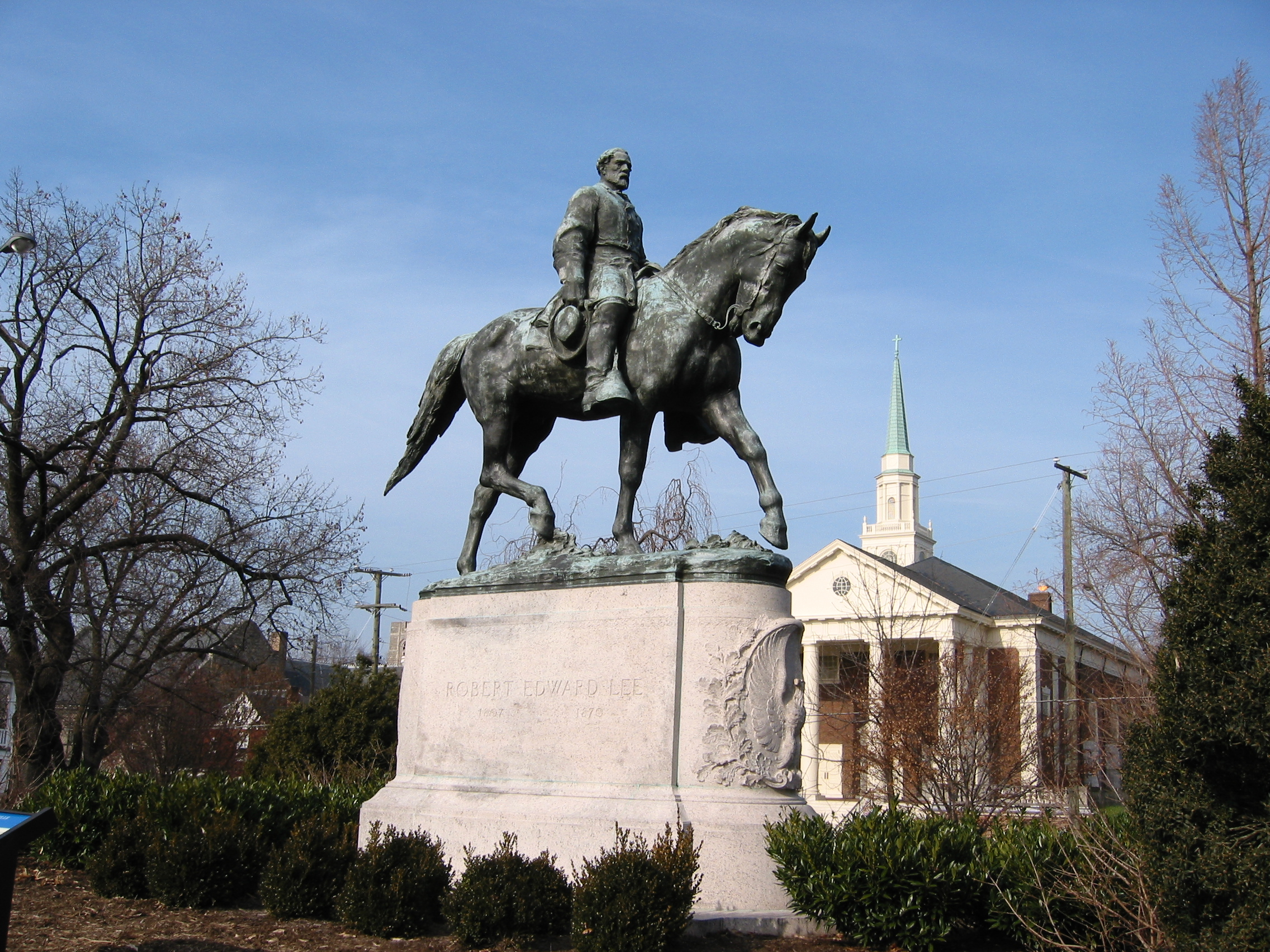
Planned removal of the Robert Edward Lee Sculpture in Charlottesville, Va. sparked protests and counter-protests, resulting in three deaths.

Just five Confederate memorials were removed in the century-and-a-half after the Civil War. The modern effort to remove them was sparked by the Charleston church shooting of 2015. In the two years that followed, eight memorials were removed. In the city of New Orleans, a crane had to be brought in from an unidentified out-of-state company as no local company wanted the business.

The removal movement was further galvanized by the August 2017 Unite the Right rally, which gathered in Charlottesville, Virginia, to protest the proposed removal of its Robert Edward Lee statue. The rally saw deadly violence and the public display of white supremacist symbols. Within days, other cities moved to remove similar memorials. In Baltimore, for example, the city's Confederate statues were removed on the night of August 15–16, 2017. Mayor Catherine Pugh said that she ordered the overnight removals to preserve public safety. Similarly, in Lexington, Kentucky, Mayor Jim Gray asked the city council on August 16, 2017, to approve the removal of two statues from a courthouse.

Within three years of the Charleston shooting, at least 114 Confederate monuments were removed from public spaces, according to the Southern Poverty Law Center, which published an extensive report in 2016 of Confederate memorials in public spaces and keeps an up-to-date list online. Texas removed 31, more than any other state.

A 2017 Reuters poll found that 54% of American adults stated that the monuments should remain in all public spaces, and 27% said they should be removed, while 19% said they were unsure. According to Reuters, "responses to the poll were sharply split along racial and party lines, however, with whites and Republicans largely supportive of preservation. Democrats and minorities were more likely to support removal." Another 2017 poll, by HuffPost/YouGov, found that 48% of respondents favored the "remain" option, 33% favored removal, and 18% were unsure. An NPR/PBS NewsHour/Marist Poll released in 2017 found that most Americans, including 44% of African Americans, believe that statues honoring leaders of the Confederacy should remain in place.

In 2017, Jason Spencer, a white member of the Georgia legislature, told an African-American colleague that if she continued calling for removal of Confederate monuments, she wouldn't be "met with torches but something a lot more definitive," and that people who want the statues gone "will go missing in the Okefenokee....Don't say I didn't warn you."

Various groups of proponents met March 22–24, 2018, in New Orleans "to commemorate, celebrate and strategically align Take 'Em Down efforts". A second such conference was held March 22–24, 2019, in Jacksonville, Florida.

In April 2020, a study found that Confederate monuments were more likely to be removed in localities that had a large black and Democratic population, a chapter of the NAACP, and Southern state legislatures that have the power to decree removal. Public support for removal increased during the George Floyd protests, with 52% in favor of removal, and 44% opposed.

Most of the removals have been undertaken by state and local governments, while a relative few memorials were pulled down by protestors. For example, the bust of Robert E. Lee in Fort Myers, Florida, was toppled by unknown parties during the night of March 11–12, 2019. At least three were demolished by protestors in states that had passed laws to make it more difficult to legally remove them: Silent Sam, in Chapel Hill, North Carolina; the Confederate Soldiers Monument in Durham, North Carolina; and the Screven County Confederate Dead Monument, in Sylvania, Georgia. The latter two were damaged beyond repair, while Silent Sam, which was not seriously damaged, was placed in storage, awaiting a political decision on its fate. The "Confederate Dead Monument" was replaced through funds raised by the Sons of Confederate Veterans and the United Daughters of the Confederacy.

Years	Removals
1865–2009	2
2009–2014	3
2015 (after Charleston church shooting)	4
2016	4
2017 (year of the Unite the Right rally)	36
2018	8
2019	4
2020 (after murder of George Floyd)	94
2021	17
2022	16

== Legal impediments ==
Seven states have passed laws that impede or forbid the removal or alteration of public Confederate monuments. Laws in Georgia (early 20th century), North Carolina (2015), and Alabama (2017) prohibit removal or alteration. Laws in South Carolina (2000), Mississippi (2004), and Tennessee (2013, updated 2016) impede such actions.

A 1902 law in Virginia was repealed in 2020; other attempts to repeal state laws have not been successful.

In 2023, Florida Republican Dean Black filed legislation that would punish any lawmakers who vote to remove "historical monuments and memorials". Under this bill, if local lawmakers vote in favor of the removal of Confederate statues, they may be fined or removed from office by the governor. The bill died in committee in March 2024.

=== Tennessee law ===
In 2016, Tennessee passed its Tennessee Heritage Protection Act, which requires a two-thirds majority of the Tennessee Historical Commission to rename, remove, or move any public statue, monument, or memorial. A 2018 amendment passed in response to events in Memphis (see below) prohibits municipalities from selling or transferring ownership of memorials without a waiver, and "allows any entity, group or individual with an interest in a Confederate memorial to seek an injunction to preserve the memorial in question". The New York Times wrote in 2018 that the Tennessee act shows "an express intent to prevent municipalities in Tennessee from taking down Confederate memorials".

As of 2022, the Tennessee Historical Commission has considered seven petitions to remove a Confederate monument and approved just one: for the Forrest bust in the state capitol.

=== South Carolina law ===
The removal of the Confederate flag from the South Carolina capitol required a two-thirds vote of both houses of the legislature, as would the removal of any other Confederate monument in South Carolina.

=== North Carolina law ===
A state law, the Cultural History Artifact Management and Patriotism Act of 2015, prevents local governments from removing monuments on public property, and places limits on their movement within the property. In August 2017, Governor Roy Cooper asked the North Carolina Legislature to repeal the law, writing: "I don't pretend to know what it's like for a person of color to pass by one of these monuments and consider that those memorialized in stone and metal did not value my freedom or humanity. Unlike an African-American father, I'll never have to explain to my daughters why there exists an exalted monument for those who wished to keep her and her ancestors in chains...We cannot continue to glorify a war against the United States of America fought in the defense of slavery. These monuments should come down." He also asked the Department of Natural and Cultural Resources to "determine the cost and logistics of removing Confederate monuments from state property". Cooper later removed, on the grounds of public safety, three Confederate monuments at the North Carolina Capitol that the legislature had in effect made illegal to remove.

After the University of North Carolina renamed Saunders Hall in 2014 (see below), its Board of Trustees prohibited further renamings for 16 years.

In 2019, North Carolina's law prohibiting monument removal was challenged indirectly. The Confederate Soldiers Monument in Winston-Salem was removed as a public nuisance, and a similar monument in Pittsboro was removed after a court ruled that it had never become county property, so the statute did not apply.

=== Virginia law ===
On March 8, 2020, the Virginia legislature "passed measures that would undo an existing state law that protects the monuments and instead let local governments decide their fate". On April 11, 2020, Governor Ralph Northam signed the bill into law, which went into effect on July 1. Previously, the state law had prohibited local governments from taking the monuments down, moving them, or even adding placards explaining why they were erected.

=== Alabama law ===
Alabama's law, the Alabama Memorial Preservation Act, was passed in May 2017. On January 14, 2019, a circuit judge ruled that the law is an un-Constitutional infringement on the City of Birmingham's right to free speech, and cannot be enforced. On November 27, 2019, the Alabama Supreme Court reversed that ruling by a vote of nine to zero. In their decision, the court stated that "a municipality has no individual, substantive constitutional rights and that the trial court erred by holding that the City has constitutional rights to free speech."

=== Unsuccessful federal legislation ===
On July 22, 2020, amid the George Floyd protests, the U.S. House of Representatives voted 305–113 to remove a bust of Chief Justice Roger B. Taney from the old robing room next to the Old Supreme Court Chamber in the Capitol Building. The bill (H.R. 7573 (116th)) would also have removed statues honoring Confederate figures and create a "process to obtain a bust of Justice Thurgood Marshall and place it there within a minimum of two years." The bill reached the Republican-led Senate on July 30, 2020 (S.4382 (116th)) and was referred to the Committee on Rules and Administration, which took no further action on it.

== Vestigial pedestals ==
The empty pedestals or plinths left after monument removal have met various fates.

In Baltimore, one of the four empty plinths was used in 2017 for a statue of a pregnant black woman, naked from the waist up, holding a baby in a brightly covered sling on her back, with a raised golden fist: Madre Luz (Mother Light). The statue was first placed in front of the monument before its removal, then raised to the pedestal. Artist Pablo Machioli said "his original idea was to construct a pregnant mother as a symbol of life. 'I feel like people would understand and respect that'". The statue was vandalized several times before it was removed by the city.

For the toppled Silent Sam monument at the University of North Carolina at Chapel Hill, two scholars proposed leaving the "empty pedestal — shorn all original images and inscriptions — [which] eliminates the offending tribute while still preserving a record of what these communities did and where they did it.... The most effective way to commemorate the rise and fall of white supremacist monument-building is to preserve unoccupied pedestals as the ruins that they are — broken tributes to a morally bankrupt cause." Instead, the plinth and its plaques were removed on January 14, 2019, at the direction of university Chancellor Carol Folt.

The plinths of the statues in Richmond, Virginia, were removed in 2022. In some of Richmond's Monument Avenue intersections, the spotlights remain—pointed upward toward now-empty space.

== List of removals ==
=== National ===
In 2000, the U.S. Army renamed Forrest Road - named for Confederate general and Klan leader Nathan Bedford Forrest - at Fort Bliss after receiving complaints. The road was renamed Cassidy Road after Lt. Gen. Richard T. Cassidy, a former post commander.

In February 2020, the commandant of the Marine Corps, General David H. Berger, ordered "the removal of all Confederate-related paraphernalia from Marine Corps installations", including Confederate flags, bumper stickers, and "similar items".

The U.S. Navy has similarly prohibited the display of the Confederate flag, including as bumper stickers on private cars on base; a wave of corporate product re-branding has also ensued.

In 2021, Congress ordered the Defense Department to establish a commission to consider whether to rename various bases, ships, buildings, streets, and other things named to honor Confederate figures. In 2022, this Naming Commission recommended changing the names of nine Army bases, two Navy ships, and other items. Defense Secretary Lloyd Austin pledged to follow the commission's recommendations.

In May 2022, the first part of the Naming Commission's report recommended changing the names of nine Army bases:

- Fort Benning, Georgia, was renamed Fort Moore, in honor of Lt. Gen. Hal Moore and his wife Julia Moore. However, on March 3, 2025, the name was restored, being named for Corporal Fred G. Benning rather than Henry L. Benning.
- Fort Bragg, originally named in honor of Confederate General Braxton Bragg, was renamed Fort Liberty in 2023. The Fort was renamed back to Fort Bragg in honor of WWII veteran Roland L. Bragg.
- Fort Gordon, Georgia, was renamed Fort Eisenhower. However, the name was later reverted, honoring Sergeant Gary Gordon rather than John B. Gordon.
- Fort A. P. Hill, Virginia, was renamed Fort Walker, in honor of Dr. Mary Edwards Walker, the first female Army surgeon. The name was later reverted though, now standing for Fort Anderson-Pinn-Hill, honoring three Union soldiers: Lieutenant Colonel Edward Hill, First Sergeant Robert A. Pinn, and Private Bruce Anderson. The name was formerly credited to Confederate Lieutenant General A. P. Hill.
- Fort Hood, Texas, was renamed Fort Cavazos, in honor of Gen. Richard E. Cavazos, who won the Distinguished Service Cross during the Korean War. But was later reverted to honor Colonel Robert B. Hood, as opposed to John Bell Hood.
- Fort Lee, Virginia, was renamed Fort Gregg-Adams on April 27, 2023, in honor of Lt. Gen. Arthur J. Gregg and Lt. Col. Charity Adams But was later renamed, honoring Spanish-American War soldier Fitz Lee, as opposed to Robert E. Lee.
- Fort Pickett, Virginia, was renamed Fort Barfoot on March 24, 2023, in honor of Colonel Van T. Barfoot, who received the Medal of Honor for service during World War II. The name was later reverted to honor WWII Soldier Vernon W. Pickett, instead of George Pickett.
- Fort Polk, Louisiana, was renamed Fort Johnson, in honor of Sgt. William Henry Johnson, who performed heroically in the first African American unit of the United States Army to engage in combat in World War I. But the name was reverted to honor Gen. James H. Polk instead of Leonidas Polk.
- Fort Rucker, Alabama, was renamed Fort Novosel on April 10, 2023, in honor of Army aviator CW4 Michael J. Novosel, who received the Medal of Honor for service in Vietnam. However, the name was reverted, honoring Captain Edward W. Rucker as opposed to Edmund Rucker.

The last of these changes were finalized in June 2025.

By December 2022, the Naming Commission had also directed the United States Naval Academy in Annapolis, Maryland, and the United States Military Academy in West Point, New York, to rename buildings, roads, and other facilities. West Point also removed several displays related to former superintendent Robert E. Lee, including a portrait, bust, quotation, and bronze panels depicting him and members of the Ku Klux Klan.

=== Alabama ===
- Alabama State Capitol, Montgomery: On June 24, 2015, in the wake of the Charleston church shooting on June 17, 2015, on the order of Governor Robert J. Bentley, the four Confederate flags and their poles were removed from the Confederate Memorial Monument.
- Anniston
  - The monument to Confederate artillery officer John Pelham, erected in 1905, was removed by the city on September 27, 2020. It was rededicated March 26, 2022, on public (county) property. An Alabama law prohibiting the removal of historical monuments was deliberately broken by the city council of Anniston, Alabama.
- Birmingham
  - The Confederate Soldiers and Sailors Monument was erected in 1905. In the midst of the George Floyd protests, was removed by the city on June 1, 2020, in violation of the Alabama Memorial Preservation Act of 2017, a law passed specifically to prevent the removal of this monument. It was the most prominent Confederate monument in the state. The Alabama Attorney General has filed suit against the city of Birmingham for violating the statute; the city could be fined $25,000 for the violation but cannot be forced to restore the monument. Mayor Randall Woodfin said the fine would be much more affordable than the cost of continued unrest in the city.
- Demopolis
  - Confederate Park. Renamed "Confederate Park" in 1923 at the request of the United Daughters of the Confederacy. A Confederate soldier statue was erected in 1910 at the intersection of North Main Avenue and West Capital Street adjacent to the Park. It was destroyed on July 16, 2016, when a policeman accidentally crashed his patrol car into the monument. The statue fell from its pedestal and was heavily damaged. In 2017, Demopolis city government voted 3–2 to move the damaged Confederate statue to a local museum and to install a new obelisk memorial that honors both the Union and the Confederate soldiers.
- Huntsville
  - The statue of an unnamed Confederate soldier which stood outside the Madison County Courthouse in downtown Huntsville since 1905 was removed on October 23, 2020.
- Mobile
  - In 2020, a statue of Confederate Navy Admiral Raphael Semmes removed from downtown on orders of Mayor Sandy Stimpson. The $25,000 fine was paid by July 10.
- Montgomery
  - The statue of Robert E. Lee in front of the Robert E. Lee High School was removed on June 1, 2020. Four people were charged with felony criminal mischief. In November 2022, the Montgomery school board announced the school would be renamed to Dr. Percy L. Julian High School after Percy Lavon Julian.
- Tuscaloosa
  - In September 2020, the University of Alabama trustees renamed Morgan Hall, named for a Confederate general and U.S. Senator John Tyler Morgan, to the English Building.

=== Alaska ===
- Kusilvak Census Area: In 1913, Judge John Randolph Tucker named the Wade Hampton Census Area to commemorate his father-in-law. It was renamed Kusilvak Census Area in 2015 to remove a place named for a slave-holding Confederate general.

=== Arizona ===
- Picacho Peak State Park: A wooden marker dedicated to Col. Sherod Hunter's Arizona volunteers was removed by Arizona State Parks & Trails in 2015. Deterioration of the wood was the supposed cause of the removal.
- Wesley Bolin Plaza, Arizona State Capitol, Phoenix: Regifted in a letter by the UDC dated June 30, 2020, to the State stating "These monuments were gifted to the State and are now in need of repair but due to the current political climate, we believe it unwise to repair them where they are located." Removed July 22, 2020.
- Jefferson Davis Highway Marker, U.S. 60 at Peralta Road, near Apache Junction: Regifted in a letter by the UDC dated June 30, 2020, to the State stating "These monuments were gifted to the State and are now in need of repair but due to the current political climate, we believe it unwise to repair them where they are located." Removed July 22, 2020.
- Picacho Peak State Park: A brass plaque honoring Confederate soldiers who fought there was vandalized and removed in June 2020. According to officials from Arizona State Parks and Trails and the Arizona Historical Society (AHS), it will not be replaced. Stated one AHS official, "Times change. We probably put our name on a few things we shouldn't have."

=== Arkansas ===
In 2017, the Arkansas Legislature voted to stop honoring Robert E. Lee's birthday.

In 2019, the Arkansas Legislature voted to replace Arkansas's two statues in the National Statuary Hall Collection. Uriah Milton Rose, an attorney and founder of the Rose Law Firm, advised against secession, but backed the Confederacy during the war; while not a soldier or elected officeholder, he served the Confederacy as chancellor of Pulaski County, later being appointed the Confederacy's state historian. A statue of white supremacist progressive era-Governor James Paul Clarke was also removed. They will be replaced with statues of Johnny Cash and journalist and state NAACP president Daisy L. Gatson Bates, who played a key role in the integration of Little Rock's Central High School in 1957.

- Fort Smith:
- Little Rock:
  - Confederate Boulevard was renamed Springer Boulevard in 2015. The new name honors an African-American family prominent in the area since the Civil War.
  - Memorial to Company A, Capitol Guards, removed June 2020
- Pine Bluff
  - Pine Bluff Confederate Monument, removed from public area June 2020

=== California ===
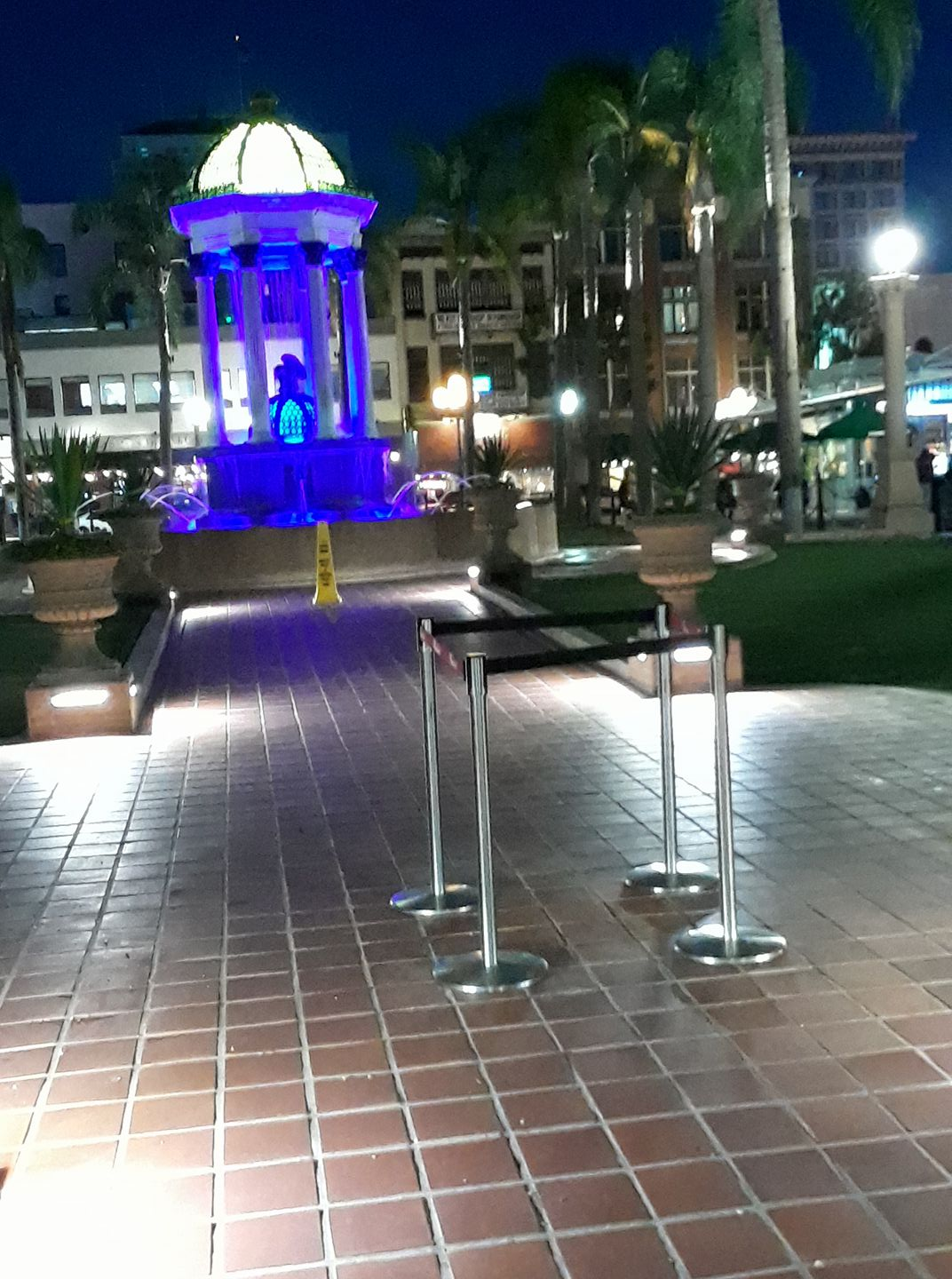
Stanchions around former site of Jefferson Davis Highway marker in Horton Plaza, San Diego on August 16, 2017

- Springtown: Established 1868. Originally known as Springtown, it was renamed Confederate Corners after a group of Southerners settled there in the late 1860s. Name changed back to "Springtown" in 2018.
- Los Angeles
  - Confederate Monument, Hollywood Forever Cemetery. "Covered with a tarp and whisked away in the middle of the night after activists called for its removal and spray-painted the word 'No' on its back", August 15, 2017.
- San Diego
  - Markers of the Jefferson Davis Highway, installed in Horton Plaza in 1926 and moved to the western sidewalk of the plaza following a 2016 renovation. Following the Unite the Right rally in Virginia, the San Diego City Council removed the plaque on August 16, 2017.

=== District of Columbia ===
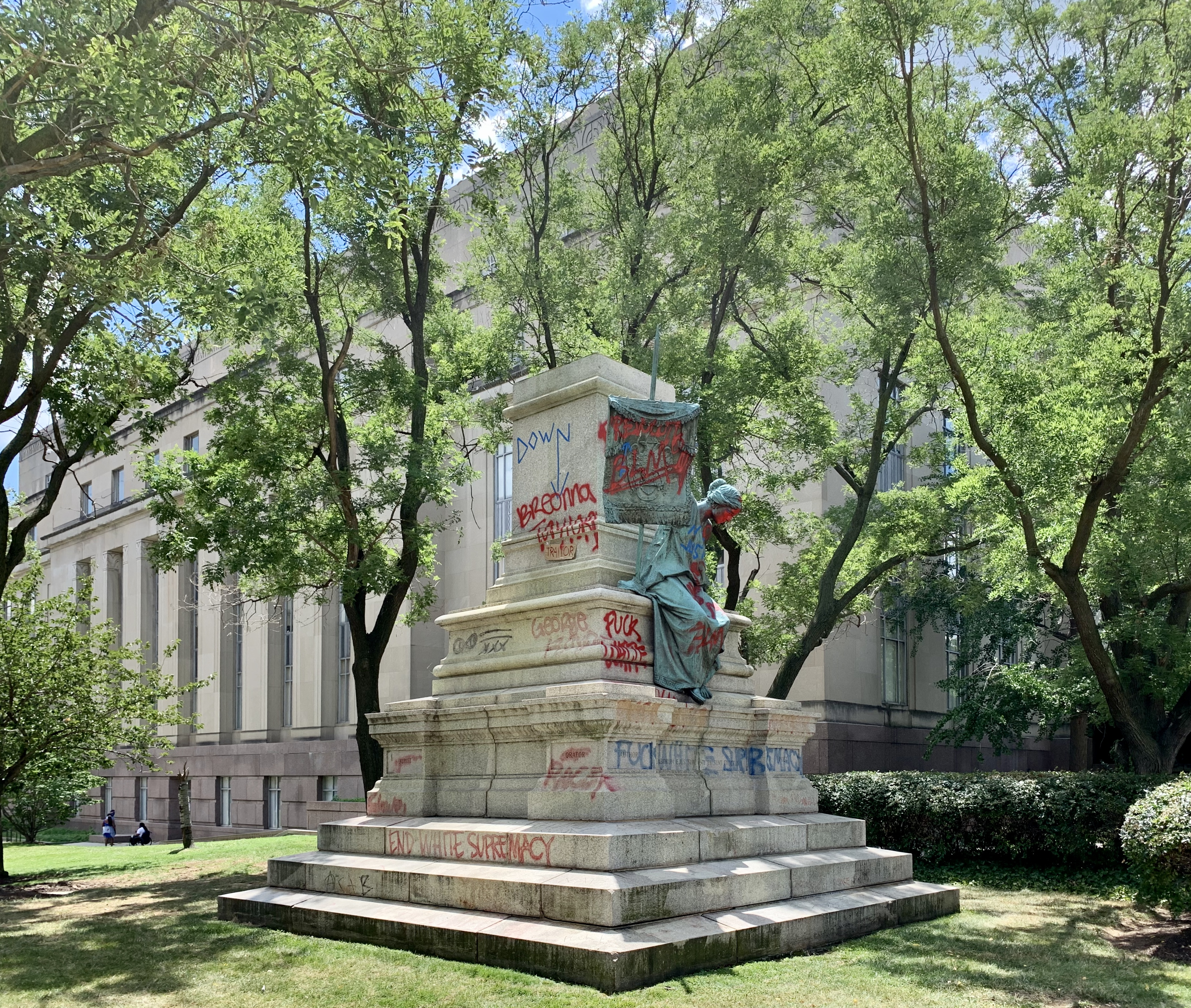
The empty, vandalized pedestal of the Albert Pike Memorial in Washington, D.C., on July 2, 2020, after the statue was toppled by protesters

- U.S. Capitol, National Statuary Hall Collection
  - Alabama's statue of Confederate officer Jabez Curry was replaced by a statue of Helen Keller in 2009.
  - In 2016, Washington National Cathedral removed small Confederate flags from stained-glass windows honoring Robert E. Lee and Stonewall Jackson. In 2017, it replaced the windows entirely.
  - In 2019, the Arkansas Legislature voted to replace Arkansas's statues; see above.
  - In July 2022, Florida's statue of Edmund Kirby Smith was replaced by a statue of civil rights advocate and educator Mary McLeod Bethune.
  - On December 21, 2020, a statue of Robert E. Lee representing Virginia was removed to be replaced by a statue of civil rights activist Barbara Rose Johns.
- Confederate Memorial Hall, a brownstone row house at 1322 Vermont Avenue NW, just off Logan Circle, was a gathering place for Confederate veterans in Washington, D.C., and later, a social hall for white politicians from the South. The organization that owned it, the Confederate Memorial Association, keeps active the 1997 web page that lists paintings and artifacts at this self-designated "Confederate Embassy". The building was seized and sold in 1997 to pay $500,000 in contempt-of-court fines imposed by District of Columbia courts on association president John Edward Hurley. It then became a private residence.
- On June 19, 2020, protesters in the movement protesting the murder of George Floyd tore down the statue of Albert Pike, doused it with a flammable liquid and ignited it. After several minutes, local police intervened, extinguished the flames, and left the scene. The statue was taken away later on. In August 2025, the NPS announced the statue would be restored.

=== Florida ===
An August 2017 meeting of the Florida League of Mayors was devoted to the topic of what to do with Civil War monuments.

- State symbols
  - Until 2016, the shield of the Confederacy was found in the Rotunda of the Florida Capitol, together with those of France, Spain, England, and the United States – all of them treated equally as "nations" that Florida was part of or governed by. The five flags "that have flown in Florida" were included on the official Senate seal, displayed prominently in the Senate chambers, on its stationery, and throughout the Capitol. On October 19, 2015, the Senate agreed to change the seal so as to remove the Confederate battle flag from it. The new (2016) Senate seal has only the flags of the United States and Florida.
- Bradenton
  - On August 22, 2017, the Manatee County Commission voted 4–3 to move the Confederate monument in front of the county courthouse to storage. This granite obelisk was dedicated on June 22, 1924, by the Judah P. Benjamin Chapter of the United Daughters of the Confederacy. It commemorates Stonewall Jackson, Robert E. Lee, and Jefferson Davis, and the "Memory of Our Confederate Soldiers". On August 24, while being moved (at 3 AM), the spire toppled and broke. The clean break is repairable, but the County recommends it not be repaired until a new home is found. No final decision has been made as of September 2018, but the Gamble Plantation Historic State Park has been suggested as a possible new home for it.
- Crestview
  - Florida's Last Confederate Veteran Memorial, City Park (1958). In 2015, ownership was transferred to trustees of Lundy's family and the memorial was moved to private property. Soon after, research determined the memorialized man had not been a veteran but had falsified his age to get veteran benefits. After the removal of the Confederate monument and flag, the park is now referred to as the "former Confederate Park".
- Daytona Beach
  - In August 2017, the Daytona Beach city manager made the decision to remove three plaques from Riverfront Park that honored Confederate veterans.
- Fort Myers
  - The bust of Robert E. Lee, on a pedestal in the median of Monroe Street downtown, was found face down on the ground on March 12, 2019; the bolts holding it in place had been removed. It did not appear to be damaged, and was removed by the Sons of Confederate Veterans. The bust had been commissioned in 1966 from Italian sculptor Aldo Pero for $6,000 by the defunct Laetitia Ashmore Nutt Chapter of UDC, chapter 1447. In 2018 there had been conflict over the future of the monument, both at a Ft. Myers City Council meeting and at the monument itself.
- Gainesville
  - Confederate monument called "Old Joe", Alachua County courthouse lawn, erected by the United Daughters of the Confederacy and unveiled January 20, 1904. Removed from government land and returned to the United Daughters of the Confederacy in 2017, which moved it to a private cemetery.
- Hollywood: Street signs named for Confederate Generals were removed in April 2018.
  - Forrest Street, named for CSA Lt. Gen. Nathan Bedford Forrest, became Freedom Street.
  - Hood Street, named for CSA Gen. John Bell Hood, became Hope Street.
  - Lee Street, named for CSA Gen. Robert E. Lee, became Liberty Street.
- Jacksonville
  - Following a petition with 160,000 signatures, Nathan Bedford Forrest High School (1959), originally an all-white school named in protest against school desegregation, renamed Westside High School in 2014 after decades of controversy.
  - In the summer of 2021, the names of six schools named for confederate figures were renamed:
    - Robert E. Lee High School was changed to Riverside High School
    - Joseph Finegan Elementary School was changed to Anchor Academy
    - Stonewall Jackson Elementary School was changed to Hidden Oaks Elementary School
    - J.E.B. Stuart Middle School was changed to Westside Middle School
    - Kirby-Smith Middle School was changed to Springfield Middle School
    - Jefferson Davis Middle School was changed to Charger Academy
  - On December 27, 2023, the Jacksonville mayor ordered the removal of the Florida's Tribute to the Women of the Confederacy monument at Springfield Park. The statue stood since 1915.
- Lakeland
  - Confederate soldier statue in downtown Munn Park, created by the McNeel Marble Works. "The United Daughters of the Confederacy paid $1,550 to erect the statue in Munn Park, the town square, on June 3, 1910. The city chipped in $200." In May 2018, the Lakeland City Commission approved unanimously the removal of the statue to Veterans Park. However, they specified that private funds would have to cover the costs. In six months, only $26,209 was raised, so commissioners voted in November "to use $225,000 in red light camera citation money to pay for the move". A coalition of individuals and groups opposed to the move, including the Sons of Confederate Veterans, filed suit in federal court alleging that the money being used was public money, but the suit was dismissed in January 2019 "as a matter of law", and the city proceeded, noting that it will be moved in the daytime. The move started on March 21, 2019.
- Orlando
  - Confederate "Johnny Reb" monument, Lake Eola Park. Erected in 1911 on Magnolia Avenue; moved to Lake Eola Park in 1917. Removed from the park to a public cemetery in 2017.
- Palatka:
  - Putnam County Confederate Memorial (1925) On August 25, 2020, the Putnam County Commission voted 4–1 to move the monument to a location not yet determined.
- Quincy:
  - Gadsden Confederate Memorial, Gadsden County Courthouse. Removed on June 11, 2020, 30 minutes after the Gadsden County Commission voted to do so.
- St. Augustine
  - Memorial to William Wing Loring, on the Plaza de la Constitución, erected behind the Government House (1920) On property belonging to the University of Florida, the University removed it, as Loring's descendants had requested.
- St. Petersburg
  - Marker for the Stonewall Jackson Memorial Highway erected on January 22, 1939, was removed on August 15, 2017.
- Tallahassee
  - The Confederate Battle Flag was included on the Senate seal from 1972 to 2016, when it was removed. It was also displayed in its chambers and on the Senate letterhead. In the wake of the racially motivated Charleston shootings, the Senate voted in October 2015 to replace the confederate symbol with the Florida state flag. The new shield was in place in 2016.
  - The Confederate Stainless Banner flag flew over the west entrance of the Florida State Capitol from 1978 until 2001, when Gov. Jeb Bush ordered it removed.

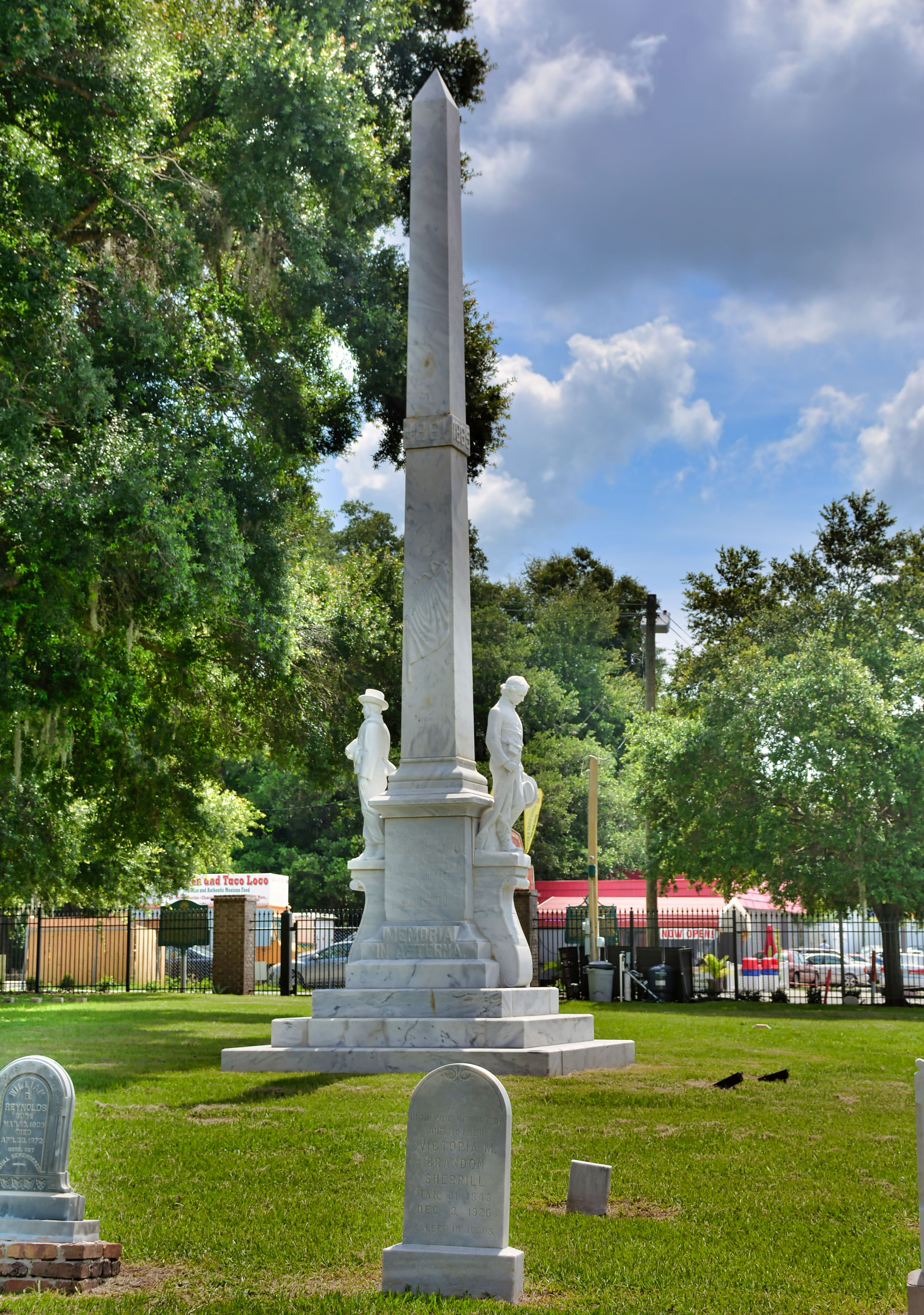
Memoria In Aeterna, now in Brandon Family Cemetery, Brandon, Florida

- Tampa
  - In 1997, county commissioners removed the Confederate flag from the Hillsborough County seal. In a compromise, they voted to hang a version of the flag in the county center. Commissioners voted in 2015 to remove that flag. In 2007, the county stopped honoring Confederate History Month.
  - In June 2017, the Hillsborough County School Board started a review of how to change the name of Robert E. Lee Elementary School in east Tampa. In September 2017, the school was seriously damaged by fire of accidental origin. Teachers and students were transferred, and the school with this name went out of existence.
  - Memoria In Aeterna ("Eternal Memory"), Old Hillsborough County Courthouse, in 2017 Annex to the current Courthouse. "The monument is comprised of two Confederate soldiers: one facing north, in a fresh uniform, upright and heading to battle, and the other facing south, his clothes tattered as he heads home humbled by war. Between them is a 32-foot-tall obelisk with the image of a Confederate flag chiseled into it." It was called "one of the most divisive symbols in Hillsborough County". It was first erected in 1911 at Franklin and Lafayette Streets, and moved to its former location, in front of the then-new county courthouse, in 1952. After voting in July 2017 to move the statue to the small Brandon Family Cemetery in the suburb that bears its name (Brandon, Florida), the County Commission announced on August 16 that the statue would only be moved if private citizens raised $140,000, the cost of moving it, within 30 days. The funds were raised within 24 hours. The following day Save Southern Heritage, Veterans' Monuments of America, and United Daughters of the Confederacy filed a lawsuit attempting to prevent the statue's move. On September 5, 2017, a Hillsborough administrative judge denied their request for an injunction. Removal of the monument, which took several days, began the same day. It was cut into 26 pieces to enable its removal. It was moved on September 5, 2017, to the Brandon Family Cemetery; the county paid half the $285,000 cost.
  - A 60 feet (18 m) x 30 feet (9.1 m) Confederate flag—when erected, the largest such flag ever made—at the privately owned Confederate Memorial Park, placed so as to be visible at the intersection of I-4 and I-75, just east of Tampa (actually Seffner, Florida), was removed on June 1, 2020, by its owner, the Sons of Confederate Veterans, after threats to burn it were made on social media.
- West Palm Beach
  - Confederate monument, Woodlawn Cemetery (1941), located at the front gate, directly behind an American flag. "The only one south of St. Augustine, likely the only Confederate statue in Palm Beach and Broward counties, said historian Janet DeVries, who leads cemetery tours at Woodlawn." Vandalized several times. Removed and placed in storage by order of Mayor Jeri Muoio on August 22, 2017, since its owner, the United Daughters of the Confederacy, had not claimed it despite notification. "Believed by local historians to be the last Confederate monument in Palm Beach County."
  - Jefferson Davis Middle School. Renamed Palm Springs Middle School in 2005.

=== Georgia ===
- State flag: From 1956 to 2001 the state flag of Georgia incorporated the Confederate battle flag. The current (2003) flag incorporates a less familiar version of the Confederacy's first flag, the Stars and Bars.
- Confederate Memorial Day and Robert E. Lee Day: Georgia removed the Confederate references in 2015; they are now known as "State Holidays".
- Athens
  - A portrait of Robert E. Lee was removed from a building on the campus of the University of Georgia by the Demosthenian Literary Society.
  - A monument was removed from Broad Street in downtown Athens in August 2020, ostensibly due to roadwork. The monument was moved to a nearby battle site.
- Atlanta: Confederate Ave was renamed United Ave after the neighborhood organized for a change in 2019.
- Brunswick: A monument that was placed in 1902 was removed on May 17, 2022, and although the City Commission voted to remove it in 2020 the final action was delayed due to legal tension.
- Decatur: The DeKalb County Confederate Monument was removed on June 18, 2020, after a court order on June 12.
- Lawrenceville: A Confederate memorial outside the Gwinnett County Courthouse was removed to storage in February 2021.
- Macon: Two Confederate monuments, the Confederate statue on Cotton Avenue (originally erected in the 1870s and originally stood on Mulberry Street prior to the 1950s) and the 'Women of the South' monument on Poplar and First Street (built by the United Daughters of the Confederacy at an unknown date), were moved to Whittle Park outside Rose Hill Cemetery on June 22, 2022, after a 2020 vote by the Macon-Bibb Commission and a lawsuit against removal had ended.
- Rome
  - Statue of a Confederate soldier was removed from atop the Rome Confederate Monument at Myrtle Hill Cemetery in December 2017 following an act of vandalism.
  - Statue of Nathan Bedford Forrest was removed from the Nathan Bedford Forrest Monument at Myrtle Hill Cemetery on January 29, 2021. It was later relocated to the Rome Area History Museum.
- Sylvania: The Screven County Confederate Dead Monument was pulled off its pedestal and "virtually destroyed" between August 30 and 31, 2018. The monument had been erected on Confederate Memorial Day, April 26, 1909, and moved to the city cemetery in the 1950s when the city turned the downtown Main Street park – where the monument was originally located – into a parking lot. The Georgia Division of the Sons of Confederate Veterans is offering a $2,000 reward for the arrest and conviction of those involved; the reward was subsequently increased to $10,000. A photo of the destroyed monument shows a flagpole with a Confederate flag.

=== Idaho ===
- Boise: In June 2020, the Cathedral of the Rockies removed a stained glass window depicting Robert E. Lee, Abraham Lincoln, and George Washington and replaced it with a stained glass window depicting Leontine T. Kelly, the first African-American woman to become a bishop in the United Methodist Church. The church leadership placed a plaque under the window acknowledging complicity in systemic racism.

=== Indiana ===
- Indianapolis: On June 8, 2020, following the protests in response to the murder of George Floyd, the Confederate Soldiers and Sailors Monument was removed from Garfield Park and dismantled. It originally marked a mass grave for Confederate soldiers who died at Camp Morton, but was moved away from the grave in 1912.

=== Kansas ===
- Wichita: Confederate Flag Bicentennial Memorial (1962, removed 2015). The Confederate battle flag had been displayed at the John S. Stevens Pavilion at Veterans Memorial Plaza near downtown since 1976, when it was placed there in a historical flag display as part of the nation's bicentennial. The flag was removed July 2, 2015, by order of Mayor Jeff Longwell.

=== Kentucky ===
- Bowling Green: a "historic" sign indicating that Bowling Green was the Confederate capital of Kentucky was removed in August 2020.
- Florence: Boone County High School. The mascot for the school was Mr. Rebel, a Confederate general who stands tall in a light blue uniform, feathered cap, and English mustache. It was removed in 2017.
- Frankfort: Statue of Jefferson Davis, Kentucky Capitol Rotunda, 1936. (Jefferson Davis was born in Kentucky.) In 2015, the all-white state Historic Properties Advisory Commission voted against removing the statue. In 2017 several prominent Republicans called for its removal. It was removed on June 13, 2020.
- Lexington
  - John C. Breckinridge Memorial (1911) and John Hunt Morgan Memorial (1887), Fayette County Courthouse. In November 2015, a committee, the Urban County Arts Review Board, voted to recommend removal of both memorials. The city council approved the removal on August 17, 2017. They were removed October 17, 2017, with the plan to move both to Lexington Cemetery. On July 24, 2018, this was accomplished.
- Louisville
  - The Confederate Monument in Louisville statue was dedicated in 1895 and was placed next to the University of Louisville on city property. It was moved to a riverfront park in Brandenburg, Kentucky, in December 2016. The cost of the move was $600,000.
  - John B. Castleman Monument, Cherokee Triangle, 1882. In June 2020, the statue was removed to be moved to Castleman's burial site in Cave Hill Cemetery.

=== Louisiana ===
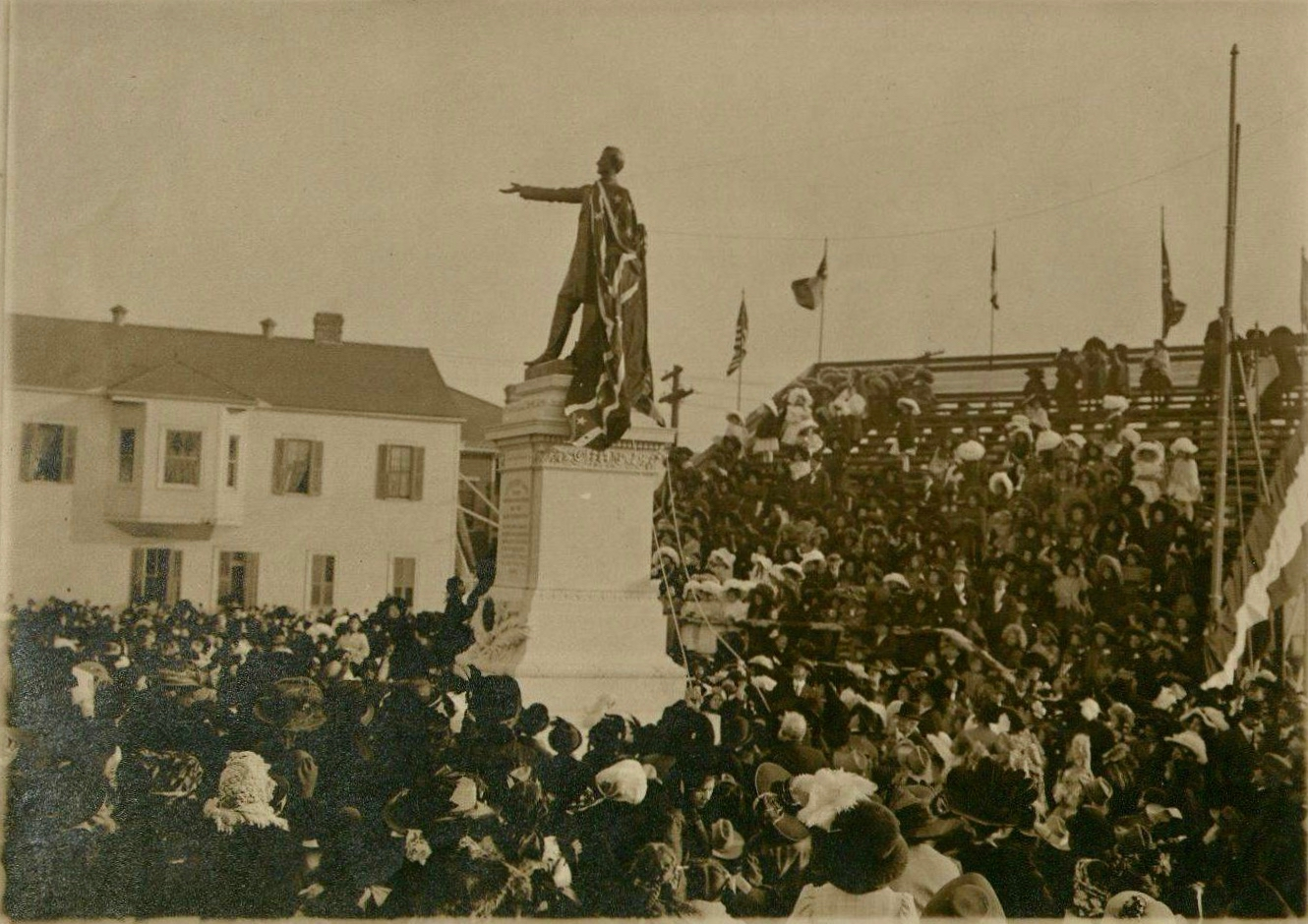
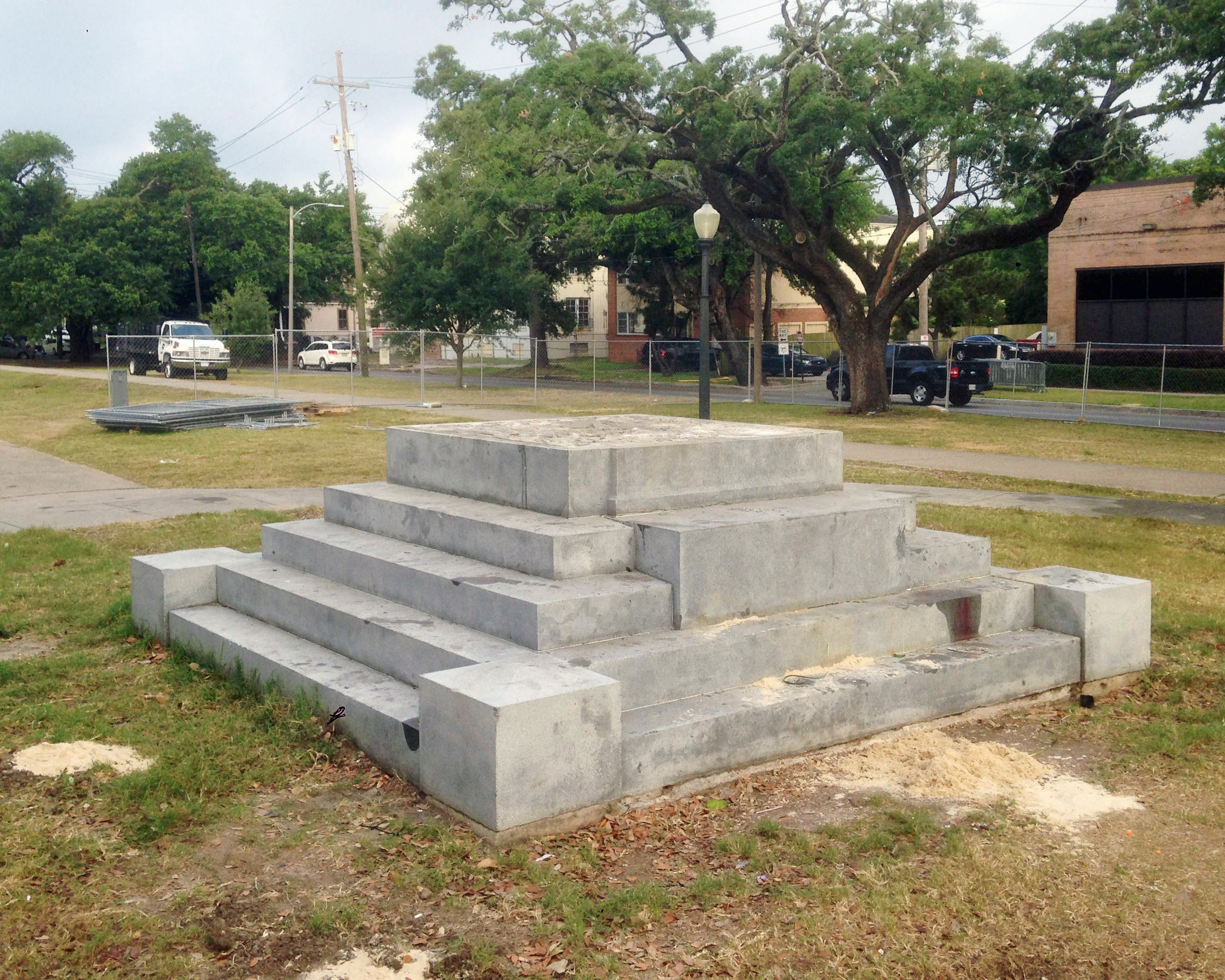
Jefferson Davis Monument in New Orleans, Louisiana; left: the monument being unveiled February 22, 1911; right: after removal of statue and pedestal May 11, 2017.
- Baton Rouge: Robert E. Lee High School, renamed Lee High School in 2016, Lee Magnet High School in 2018, and in 2020, Liberty Magnet High School. Sports teams, formerly Rebels, are now Patriots.
- New Orleans: The first Confederate monuments removed in 2017 were those of New Orleans, although it was in 2015 that the City Council ordered their removal. Court challenges were unsuccessful. The workers who moved the monuments were dressed in bullet-proof vests, helmets, and masks to conceal their identities because of concerns about their safety. According to Mayor Landrieu, "The original firm we'd hired to remove the monuments backed out after receiving death threats and having one of his cars set ablaze." "Opponents at one point found their way to one of our machines and poured sand in the gas tank. Other protesters flew drones at the contractors to thwart their work." The city said it was weighing where to display the monuments so they could be "placed in their proper historical context from a dark period of American history". On May 19, 2017, the Monumental Task Committee, an organization that maintains monuments and plaques across the city, commented on the removal of the statues: "Mayor Landrieu and the City Council have stripped New Orleans of nationally recognized historic landmarks. With the removal of four of our century-plus aged landmarks, at 299 years old, New Orleans now heads into our Tricentennial more divided and less historic." Landrieu replied on the same day: "These statues are not just stone and metal. They are not just innocent remembrances of a benign history. These monuments purposefully celebrate a fictional, sanitized Confederacy; ignoring the death, ignoring the enslavement, and the terror that it actually stood for."
  A seven-person Monument Relocation Committee was set up by Mayor LaToya Cantrell to advise on what to do with the removed monuments. The statue of Jefferson Davis, if their recommendation is implemented, will be moved to Beauvoir, his former estate in Biloxi, Mississippi, that is now a presidential library and museum. The Committee recommended that the statues of Robert E. Lee and P.G.T. Beauregard be placed in Greenwood Cemetery, near City Park Avenue and Interstate 10 (where three other Confederate generals are entombed). However, this conflicts with a policy of former mayor Mitch Landrieu, who had directed that they never again be on public display in Orleans Parish. The Battle of Liberty Place Monument will remain in storage.
  - Battle of Liberty Place Monument – Erected 1891 to commemorate the Reconstruction Era Battle of Liberty Place (1874) and celebrate Louisiana's White League. Removed April 24, 2017. The workers were dressed in flak jackets, helmets and scarves to conceal their identities because of concerns about their safety. Police officers watched from a nearby hotel.
  - Jefferson Davis Monument – Cost $35,000 and was unveiled February 22, 1911, the 50th anniversary of his inauguration as President of the Confederacy, by the Jefferson Davis Monument Association, which was formed in 1898. "The unveiling...was preceded by 'an impressive military parade' led by Major Allison Owen. Veterans of the Army of Tennessee, Washington Artillery, Camp Henry St. Paul, Army of Northern Virginia, veterans from the Soldiers Home, National Guard and the Boy Scouts all attended. A group of 500 schoolgirls formed a living Confederate flag." Removed May 11, 2017.
  - General Beauregard Equestrian Statue – Erected in 1913. Removed May 17, 2017.
  - Robert E. Lee monument – Erected in 1884. Statue atop a 60-foot (18 m) column with 12-foot (3.7 m) on an earthen mound. Statue removed May 19, 2017.
  - Edward Douglass White Jr. statue – On December 23, the statue of Edward Douglass White Jr. was moved from outside the Louisiana Supreme Court building to the interior near the court museum.
  - Renaming of public schools. In 1992, the School Board announced plans to rename schools named after owners of slaves, if the parents, teachers, and children of each school approved. Other public schools renamed, not directly relevant to the war, were originally named for Marie Couvent (a black slave owner), George Washington, William C. C. Claiborne, Samuel J. Peters, Étienne de Boré, William O. Rogers ("a general school superintendent who didn't believe blacks should be educated after the 5th grade"), and Edward Douglass White, Jr., a Supreme Court chief justice who voted to uphold the "separate but equal" doctrine in Plessy v. Ferguson.
    - Jefferson Davis Elementary School renamed in 1993 for Ernest "Dutch" Morial, New Orleans' first African-American mayor.
    - P.G.T. Beauregard Junior High School was renamed Thurgood Marshall Middle School, after the first black Supreme Court justice.
    - Robert E. Lee Elementary School renamed for Ronald McNair, the black astronaut killed in the 1986 Challenger explosion.
    - J. P. Benjamin School, named for Jefferson Davis's secretary of war, was renamed for African-American educator and civil rights activist Mary McLeod Bethune.
    - Charles Gayarre Elementary School, named for Charles Gayarré, a financial supporter of the Confederacy, was renamed after New Orleans civil rights leader Oretha Castle Haley.
    - Francis T. Nicholls High School, named for the Confederate general and Governor of Louisiana, was renamed Frederick Douglass High School after the abolitionist leader Frederick Douglass.
    - Adolph Meyer School, named for a Confederate officer and later a congressman, was renamed for the abolitionist Harriet Tubman.
    - Benjamin Palmer School, named for a pro-slavery pastor influential in Louisiana's decision to secede and join the Confederacy, was renamed Lorraine V. Hansberry Elementary School, after the African-American playwright who wrote A Raisin in the Sun.

=== Maine ===
- Brunswick, Maine: Confederate plaque, Bowdoin College. Installed in 1965, removed in August 2017.

=== Maryland ===
- State of Maryland
  - State Song: In 2021, Maryland officially repealed its state song, Maryland, My Maryland, due to controversial lyrics that call on Maryland to join the Confederacy and label the Union as tyrannical. In March 2021, both houses of the Maryland General Assembly voted to repeal the state song and governor Larry Hogan signed it into law on May 18, 2021. Since then, Maryland has had no official state song. Previously in 2017, the University of Maryland marching band announced it would no longer play the song before football games and in 2020, Pimlico Race Course scrapped its tradition of playing the song before the race.
- Plaque (1964): Maryland State House Trust removed a plaque from the Maryland State House in 2020.
  - Sons of Confederate Veterans Commemorative License Plate featuring the Confederate battle flag was revoked in 2015 after an 18-year legal battle. Existing plates are recalled for mandatory replacement.
- Baltimore
  - Confederate Soldiers and Sailors Monument (Spirit of the Confederacy), Mount Royal Avenue. Covered with red paint August 13, 2017. In 2015, marked with yellow paint saying "Black Lives Matter". Removed August 16, 2017.
  - Confederate Women's Monument. Charles Street and University Parkway. Removed August 16, 2017.
  - Robert E. Lee Park was renamed Lake Roland Park in 2015.
  - Stonewall Jackson and Robert E. Lee Monument. On the northwestern side of the Wyman Park Dell, Charles Village, opposite the Baltimore Museum of Art, and just south of Homewood Campus of Johns Hopkins University (1948). Removed August 16, 2017.
- Catonsville: 1942 mural in Post Office depicting "enslaved Black people pulling barrels of tobacco alongside White men on horses" has been covered with plastic sheeting, pending decision on what to do with it and what to replace it with.
- Charlotte Hall: Plaque installed in 1993 removed from Charlotte Hall Veterans Home.
- Easton: A statue commemorating the Talbot Boys is removed from the lawn of the county courthouse. It was the last Confederate statue to be removed from a courthouse.
- Ellicott City, Howard County: Howard County Courthouse Confederate Monument. Dedicated in 1948. Removed on August 22, 2017.
- Lothian: A statue of Confederate soldier Benjamin Welch Owens was vandalized in June 2020 and toppled in July 2020.
- Rockville: Confederate Monument, lifesize and bronze, on a granite pedestal.
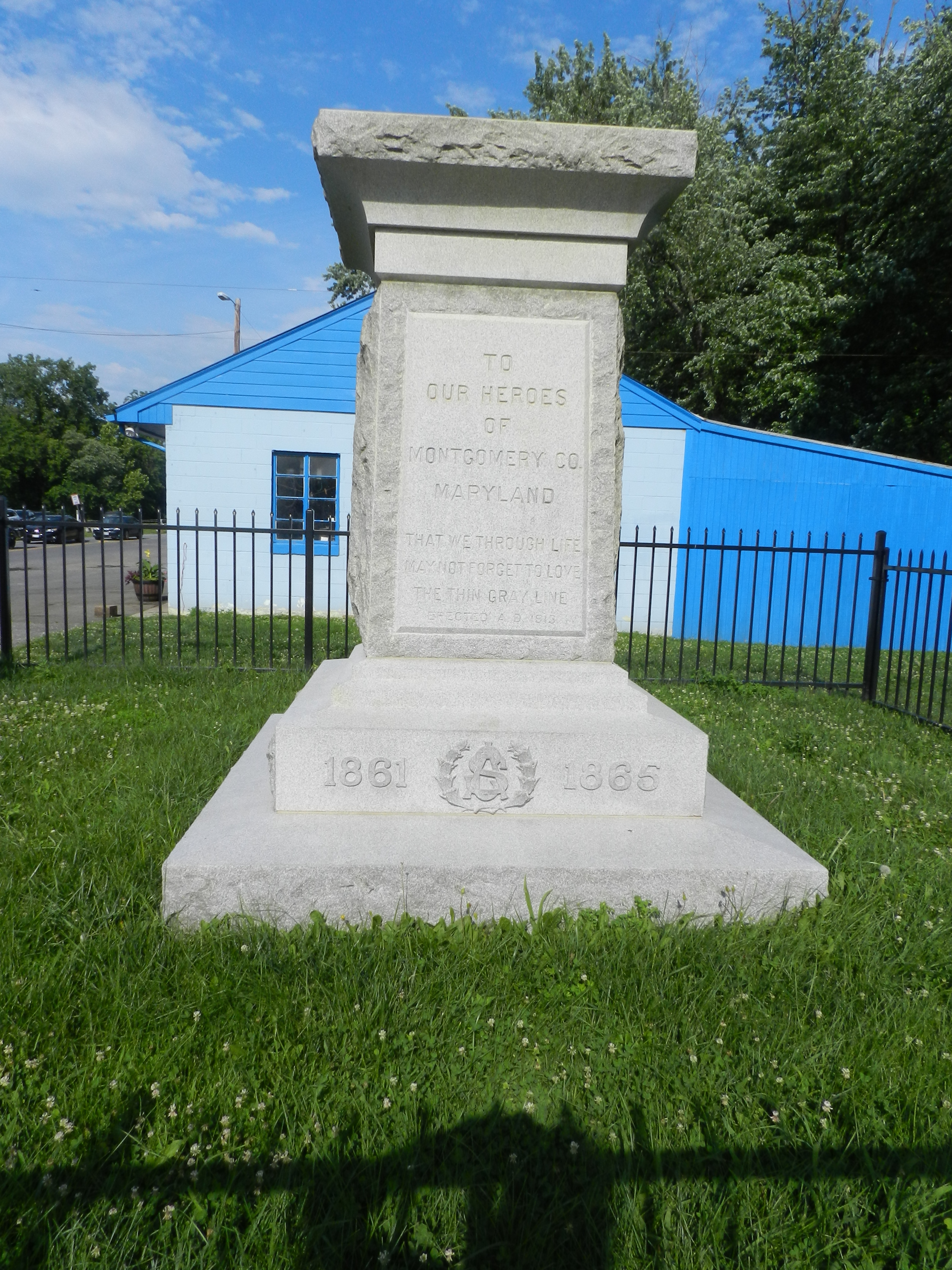
  The base of the CSA monument moved from Rockville, MD, to White's Ferry, MD.
  It was originally donated by the UDC and the United Confederate Veterans, and built by the Washington firm of Falvey Granite Company at a cost of $3,600. The artist is unknown. Inscription: "To Our Heroes of Montgomery Co. Maryland That We Through Life May Not Forget to Love The Thin Gray Line Erected A.D. 1913 / 1861 CSA 1865." (Gray was the color of Confederate uniforms.) The dedication was on June 3, 1913 (Jefferson Davis's birthday), and 3,000 (out of a county population of 30,000) attended. It was originally located in a small triangular park called Courthouse Square. In 1971, urban renewal led to the elimination of the Square, and the monument was moved to the east lawn of the Red Brick Courthouse (no longer in use as such), facing south. In 1994 it was cleaned and waxed by the Maryland Military Monuments Commission. It was marked with "Black Lives Matter" in 2015; a wooden box was built over it to protect it. The monument was removed in July 2017 from its original location outside the Old Rockville Court House to private land at White's Ferry in Dickerson, Maryland.
- Silver Spring: Confederate Monument, Grace Episcopal Church Cemetery, 1896. Commemorated the death and burial of 17 unknown Confederate Soldiers who died at the Battle of Fort Stevens. The monument, a stone obelisk, could be seen from Georgia Ave.
- White's Ferry, Montgomery County: A passenger and vehicle ferry, formerly named Gen. Jubal A. Early (1954), connects Montgomery County, Maryland, and Loudoun County, Virginia. Owned by White's Ferry, it was named for Confederate General Jubal Early until June 2020. White's Ferry is the only ferry still in operation on the Potomac River.

=== Massachusetts ===
- Fort Warren, Georges Island, Boston Harbor: Memorial to 13 Confederate prisoners who died in captivity. Dedicated in 1963; removed October 2017.
- Oak Bluffs, Martha's Vineyard: In 2019, the town removed two plaques honoring Confederate soldiers from a statue of a Union soldier. They were remounted in a contextual display in the Martha's Vineyard Museum.

=== Michigan ===
- Lowell: The 1935 Robert E. Lee Show Boat: A campaign by Former Representative Dave Hildenbrand to request money from Rick Snyder's administration resulted in a taxpayer funded grant to rebuild the confederate-named boat. What followed was a contentious and successful petition to change the boat's name. It was demolished February 28, 2019.

=== Mississippi ===
- Statewide
  - On June 30, 2020, Governor Tate Reeves signed a bill to remove the second flag of Mississippi (1894) from public buildings within 15 days and establish a new flag for the state. Voters approved the new flag with 68% of the vote on November 3, 2020.
  - "Several city and county governments and all eight of Mississippi's public universities have stopped flying the state flag in recent years amid critics' concerns that it does not properly represent a state where 38 percent of residents are African-American."
- Greenwood
  - A Confederate monument is to be removed and replaced with a statue of Emmett Till.
- Jackson
  - Davis Magnet IB School. Renamed "Barack Obama Magnet IB School" in 2017.
  - (Col. John Logan) Power Academic and Performing Arts Complex is renamed for Ida B. Wells and Robert E. Lee Elementary School is renamed for "Drs. Aaron and Ollye Shirley" in December 2020.
- Oxford
  - Confederate Drive renamed Chapel Lane
  - In 2016, the University of Mississippi marching band, called The Pride of the South, stopped playing Dixie. The school got rid of its Colonel Reb mascot in 2003.

=== Missouri ===
- Columbia: In 2018, the Columbia Board of Education voted unanimously to change the name of Robert E. Lee Elementary School to Locust Street Expressive Arts Elementary School.
- Kansas City, Missouri: United Daughters of the Confederacy Monument on Ward Parkway. The memorial to Confederate women, a 1934 gift by the United Daughters of the Confederacy, was covered by graffiti on August 18, 2017, and boxed up two days later in preparation for its removal. The monument was removed on August 25, 2017.
- St. Louis
  - Memorial to the Confederate Dead (1914), removed in June 2017 from Forest Park. It awaits a new home outside St. Louis City and County limits (per agreement between the city and the Missouri Civil War Museum in Jefferson Barracks).
  - Confederate Drive (1914). Road removed and replaced with green space in 2017.

=== Montana ===
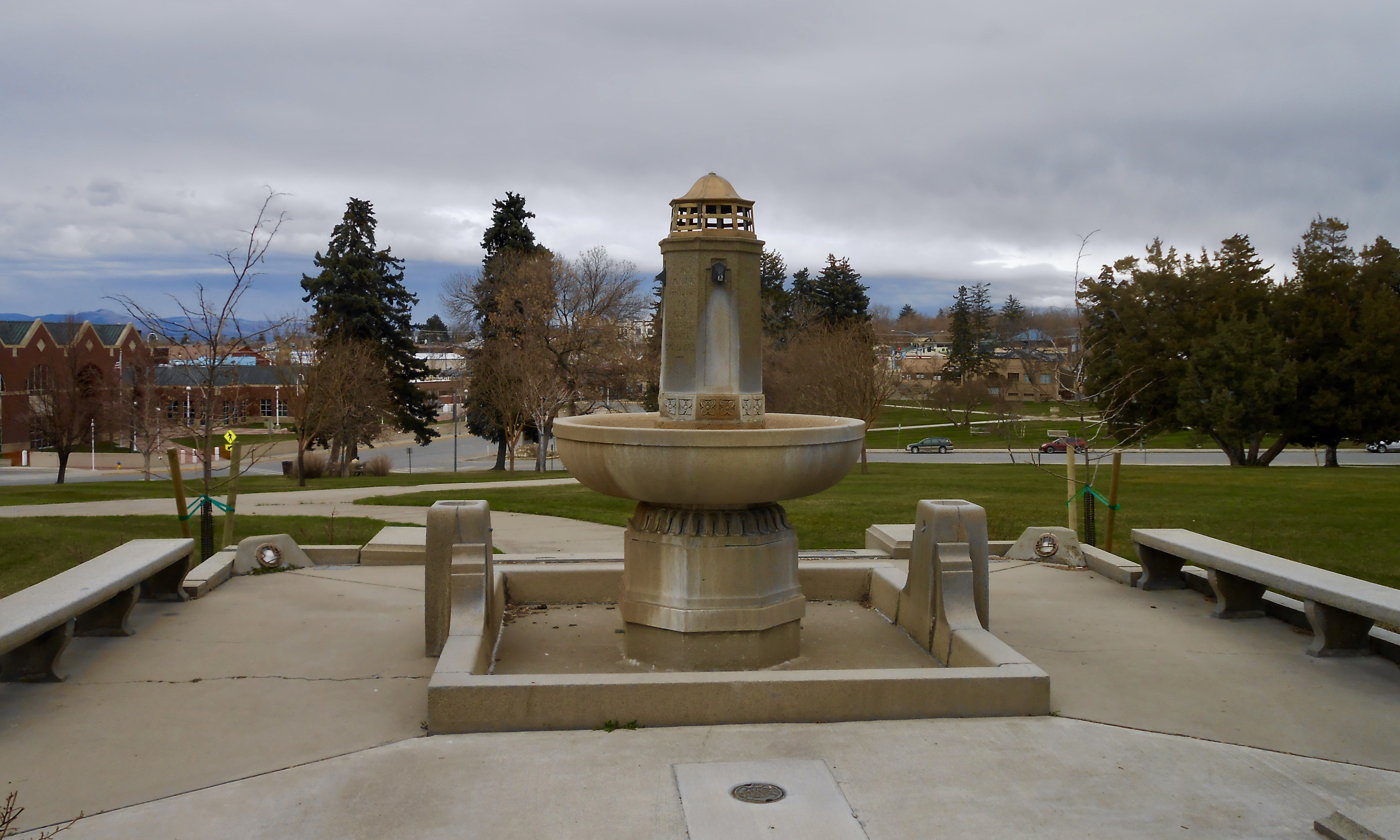
Confederate Memorial Fountain in Helena, Montana before removal

- Helena: Confederate Memorial Fountain (1916). City Council voted August 17, 2017, to remove it. It was removed on August 18, 2017. In its place is a new fountain known as the Equity Fountain, installed in 2020.

=== Nevada ===
- Paradise: University of Nevada, Las Vegas (UNLV): Until the 1970s, the school mascot was Beauregard, a wolf dressed in a gray military field jacket and Confederate cap. Beauregard was named for CSA Gen. P.G.T. Beauregard.

=== New Mexico ===
- The three Jefferson Davis Highway markers in the state were removed in 2018.

=== New York ===
- New York City
  - Central Park
    - In November 2017, the cover of Harper's Magazine featured J. C. Hallman's article "Monumental Error" about the Central Park monument of controversial surgeon – and Confederate spy – J. Marion Sims. The timing coincided with the work New York City Mayor Bill de Blasio's committee on monuments, and Hallman's article was distributed to members of New York's Public Design Commission. The commission voted unanimously to remove Sims's statue, and it was removed in April 2018. Hallman has since written articles about Sims's statue in Montgomery, Alabama, and is working on a book, The Anarcha Quest, about Sims and his so-called "first cure", Anarcha Westcott.
  - Brooklyn
    - On August 16, 2017, the Episcopal Diocese of Long Island removed a 1912 plaque from a tree Robert E. Lee planted between 1842 and 1847. They also removed a second marker erected by the United Daughters of the Confederacy in 1935.
    - New York Governor Andrew Cuomo has ordered name changes of streets named for Lee and Jackson in the Fort Hamilton section of Brooklyn.
  - The Bronx
    - Busts of Stonewall Jackson and Robert E. Lee, formerly in the Hall of Fame for Great Americans at Bronx Community College (formerly New York University), were removed in 2017 by New York State Governor Andrew Cuomo.

=== North Carolina ===
- Statewide: The North Carolina Department of Transportation stopped authorizing the use of specialized license plates of the North Carolina Sons of Confederate Veterans that depict a Confederate battle flag in January 2021. The organization will be able to display other specialty plates.
- Asheville:
  - In a joint agreement between the city of Asheville and Buncombe County to remove two Confederate monuments that are located in or near Pack Square Park, crews began by the removal of the Robert E. Lee Dixie Highway, Colonel John Connally Marker (1926) on July 10, 2020, leaving only the base for future use. On July 14, crews removed the Monument to 60th Regt. NC Volunteers (1905), located in front of the Buncombe County courthouse. Both monuments were moved to a County-own storage facility, where they will stay till a future decision is made.
  - The Zebulon Vance Monument (1898), a 75-foot (23 m) obelisk located at the center of Pack Square Park, was completely covered with a shroud on July 10, 2020, at a cost of $18,500 and a monthly scaffolding rental cost of $2,400. The monument was removed by the City of Asheville in May 2021.
- Chapel Hill:
  - A 1923 building at the University of North Carolina-Chapel Hill was named for William L. Saunders, Colonel in the Confederate army and head of the Ku Klux Klan in North Carolina. In 2014, the building was renamed Carolina Hall.
  - Silent Sam, a statue erected in 1913 at the entrance to the University of North Carolina (today the University of North Carolina at Chapel Hill) as a memorial to its Confederate alumni, was pulled down, after years of protests, on August 20, 2018. As of November 1, 2024, the University has not decided whether or where the statue will be restored. In her January 19, 2019, letter of resignation as Chancellor, Carol Folt ordered the removal of the plinth and plaques as a threat to public safety, as they attracted pro-Confederate demonstrators unconnected with the University. A proposal to build a special museum on the campus for the statue was rejected as too expensive and wasteful of resources. A scandal erupted in late 2019 after the press reported a secret agreement to transfer the monument to the Sons of Convederate Veterans, with funding. This deal collapsed once it was exposed. As of November 2024 the statue remains in an undisclosed University of North Carolina warehouse, and its fate remains undecided.
  - The Orange County Board of Commissioners voted unanimously on October 16, 2018, to remove the Jefferson Davis Highway designation from the portion of US 15 that runs through the county. A marker stands at the intersection of East Franklin Street (formerly the route of US 15) and Henderson Street, in downtown Chapel Hill, adjacent to the University of North Carolina. The bronze plaque and stone pedestal were not removed immediately because it was not clear who their owner was.
- Charlotte:
  - In 2015, the Mecklenburg County Confederate Soldiers Monument (1977) was vandalized following the events of the Charleston church shooting on June 17. In July, the monument was removed from its location at the northwest corner of the Old City Hall for cleaning. Later that same month, the "Historic Artifact Management and Patriotism Act" became law while the monument was still located in a city-owned warehouse. With a technicality, city manager Ron Carlee informed the City Council that he was moving the monument to the Confederate section of city-owned Elmwood Cemetery. By end of year, it was moved, next to other Confederate monuments and graves.
  - The Confederate Reunion Marker (1924), located on a hill next to Grady Cole Center and American Legion Memorial Stadium, was removed on June 21, 2020, after the Mecklenburg County Commission became aware of online threats to damage or deface it. No decision if the removal would be temporary or permanent.
- Clinton: On July 12, 2020, the statue that makes part of the Confederate Soldiers Monument (1916), located on the south side of the Sampson County Courthouse, was removed after it was found bent and teetering on its pedestal that morning. The base currently remains on the Courthouse grounds.
- Durham:
  - Confederate Soldiers Monument (1924) at the Old Durham County Courthouse, was pulled down and severely damaged during a protest on August 17, 2017. Eight individuals were arrested for destroying the memorial, but the charges were later dropped. The monument is being stored in a county warehouse. In early 2019, a joint city-county government committee to consider what to do with the damaged statue, recommended that it be displayed indoors in its crumpled state. "The committee said displaying the statue in its current damaged form would add important context. The proposal would leave the statue's pedestal in place and add outdoor markers honoring Union soldiers and enslaved people." The proposal needs approval from the Durham County Commission. Durham County maintains that the Cultural History Artifact Management and Patriotism Act of 2015 does not apply, since the law does not address damaged monuments. On August 11, 2020, contractors removed the stone pedestal and moved it to a secure location following the recommendation of the City-County Committee on Confederate Monuments and Memorials.
  - Statue of Robert E. Lee in the Duke Chapel, Duke University. Installed in the 1930s in consultation with "an unnamed Vanderbilt University professor". Defaced in August 2017. After vandalism, removed August 19, 2017.
  - Julian S. Carr Junior High School, for whites only, built in 1928, closed in 1975. The building became part of the formerly all-white Durham High School, which closed in 1993. Since 1995 the buildings are used by the Durham School of the Arts. On August 24, 2017, the Board of the Durham Public Schools voted unanimously to remove Carr's name from the building.
- Fayetteville: On June 27, 2020, the 1902 Confederate Monument was removed from its location between the intersection of East and West Dobbin Avenue, Morganton Street, and Fort Bragg Road, in the Haymount neighborhood. The decision of its removal was done by its owner, the J.E.B. Stuart Chapter of the United Daughters of the Confederacy (UDC), in an effort so the monument would not be vandalized. It is not known if it will be returned, moved or stay in storage indefinitely. This was its third location, originally located at the intersection of Grove, Green, Rowan, and Ramsey Streets; it moved to the northeast corner of the square in 1951 due to road realignments. In 2002, the statue was then moved to its last location, by the UDC, believing the original site lost its charm becoming to commercialized.
- Gastonia: On June 23, 2020, the Gaston County Commissioners approved creating a council of understanding to give a recommendation to the commissioners about the future of the Gaston County Confederate Soldiers Monument (1912), located at the Gaston County Courthouse along Marietta Street. The commissioners voted on July 13 to move the statue and voted on August 3 to gift the monument to the Sons of Confederate Veterans Charles Q. Petty Camp, allowing them to move it onto private property, where it can only be used as a war memorial and educational tool.
- Greensboro: On July 3, 2020, the Confederate Soldiers Monument (1888) was discovered toppled in Green Hills Cemetery. The monument, which marks the grave area of three hundred unknown Confederate soldiers, was moved into storage.
- Greenville: The Pitt County Confederate Soldiers Monument (1914) sits on the Pitt County Courthouse grounds in Greenville. On June 15, 2020, the Pitt County Board of Commissioners voted to remove the monument to a temporary location immediately, and work toward a permanent one. It was removed on June 23.
- Henderson: On July 3, 2020, the Vance County Confederate Monument (1910), located in front of the old Vance County Courthouse, was removed after Vance County Commissioners approved it by vote a few days earlier. The monument is in storage until its disposition can be decided. Upon its removal, crews discovered a time capsule that was buried beneath the monument, with artifacts that date to 1910.
- Hillsborough: The building that currently houses the Orange County Historical Museum, at 201 N. Churton St., was built in 1934 and housed the (whites only) public library. The UDC donated $7,000 towards its construction, and it was named the Confederate Memorial Library. In 1983, after the library (now the Orange County Public Library) moved into a larger facility, the Museum moved in. The word "Library" was removed from the lettering over the front door, but "Confederate Memorial" remained. In 2015, the Hillsborough Town Board voted to remove the words.

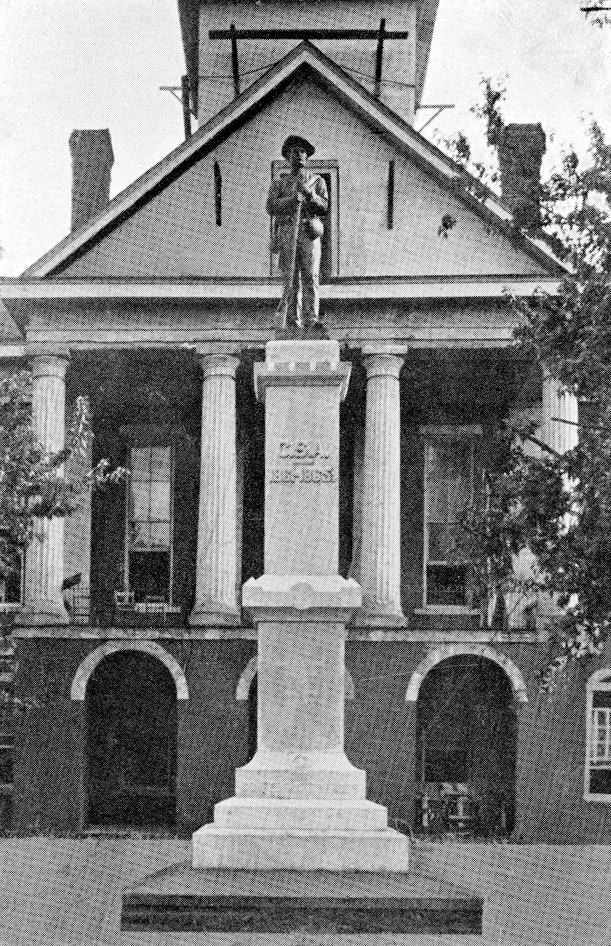
Old Chatham County Courthouse, Pittsboro, North Carolina (1908)

- Lexington: In October 2020, the United Daughters of the Confederacy requested that a Confederate monument owned by the organization which stood at the city square in Lexington since 1902 be removed. Despite objections from Davidson County Commissioners, the Confederate monument which stood at the city square in Lexington since 1902 was removed after the Davidson County Superior Court allowed for the city and the Daughters of the Confederacy to have it removed from this location. The statue would be removed from the city square late at night on October 15–16, 2020.
- Louisburg: The Louisburg Town Council voted, in emergency session on June 22, 2020, on a compromise to remove the Confederate Monument (1914) from its location on North Main Street and move it to a municipal cemetery and placed among the graves of the Confederate soldiers it memorializes. It was removed on June 30.
- Oxford: On June 24, 2020, the 34-foot (10 m) Granville County Confederate Monument (1909) was removed from its location in front of the Richard Thornton Library, next to the Granville County Revolutionary War Monument (1926). The Granville Board of Commissioners made the decision as they believed there was a credible threat that it would be forcibly removed and possible violent protest. The monument was placed in storage until a new location was determined. This was the second location of the monument; it was first located in front of the Granville County Courthouse till 1971, when it was moved to the library as a compromise from the Oxford Race Riot.
- Pittsboro: Confederate Soldiers Monument (1907), Old Chatham County Courthouse; erected by Winnie Davis Chapter, UDC. In 2019, there were "months" of discussion about what to do with it, including "multiple late-night Chatham County Board of Commissioners meetings". There were citizens' groups calling for its removal ("Chatham for All") and for leaving it alone. As it is privately owned (by the UDC), the statute protecting public Civil War monuments does not apply, said the County. In July 2019, the local UDC chapter and the county "signed a memorandum of understanding, agreeing to 'meet, cooperate, and work together in good faith to develop a mutually agreeable framework for "reimagining" the monument.'" In an August 12 statement, the UDC said the statue was given by the UDC to the county, which now owns it, "notwithstanding the statement on the south side of the statue carved in granite", the state statute does apply, and "is inappropriate that we re-imagine the statue in any way". After a court ruled that the statue belonged to the UDC and not the county, it was removed on November 20, 2019.
- Raleigh:
  - A Confederate battle flag hanging in the Old North Carolina State Capitol was removed in 2013.
  - On June 19, 2020, protesters pulled down two of the three bronze soldiers on the 75-foot (23 m) Confederate monument at the state Capitol, with one of the statues hung by its neck from the streetlight. The following day, Governor Cooper gave the orders that all three Confederate monuments, located on the Capitol grounds, to be removed for public safety. Two of the three monuments, the Women of the Confederacy (1914) and a statue of Henry Lawson Wyatt (1912), were removed that day and moved into storage. The third, what remains of the monument to fallen Confederate soldiers (1895) was removed from June 21–23. Governor Cooper laid blame to the 2015 law as creating legal roadblocks to removal that eventually led to the dangerous incidents that happened. The two cannons that flanked 75-foot Confederate monument were moved to Fort Fisher on June 28.
- Reidsville: From 1910 to 2011, the monument stood in Reidsville's downtown area. In 2011, a motorist hit the monument, shattering the granite soldier which stood atop it. Placing the monument back in the center of town sparked a debate between local officials, neighbors and friends—which resulted in it being placed at its current site—the Greenview Cemetery.
- Rocky Mount: On June 2, 2020, the City Council of Rocky Mount voted to remove the Nash County Confederate Monument (1917). The land, which the monument was located on, will be vacated by the city, reverting ownership to Rocky Mount Mills.
- Salisbury: On June 16, 2020, the Salisbury City Council voted to remove the Fame Confederate Monument (1909), located on at the intersection of West Innes and Church Streets, and move it to the Old Lutheran Cemetery, where 175 tombstones for Confederate soldiers were installed in 1996. On June 22, an agreement was signed with the Robert F. Hoke Chapter of the United Daughters of the Confederacy to which they will assist on its removal, storage, and move. The statue was removed on July 6–7, 2020.
- Wadesboro: On July 7, 2020, the Anson County Board of Commissioners voted to remove the Anson County Confederate Soldiers Monument (1906) from its location in front of the Wadesboro courthouse. The following day, the monument was removed and placed in storage, where it will remain until it can be moved onto private property at a later date.
- Warrenton: On June 24, 2020, the Warren County Confederate Monument (1913), located in front of the Warren County Courthouse, was removed from its location. The County Commission justified their decision after receiving online several threats to topple the monument; it is currently in storage.
- Wilmington: In the early morning of June 25, 2020, in what has been described as a surprise move, the City of Wilmington removed the Confederate Memorial (1924) and the George Davis Monument (1911). The city's Twitter page posted at 5:28 a.m.: "In accordance with NC law, the city has temporarily removed two monuments from the downtown area. This was done in order to protect the public safety and to preserve important historical artifacts." It is not known where the monuments are stored or what the plans for them will be.
- Winston-Salem: The Confederate Soldiers Monument (1905), formerly in front of the former Forsyth County Courthouse, now private apartments, was removed on March 12, 2019, by the city, due to safety concerns and the property owner's unwillingness to maintain it. Mayor Allen Joines said that the statue would be moved to Salem Cemetery after being temporarily in storage. It was vandalized with paint in August 2017 and again late in 2018 with the words "Cowards & Traitors" written with black marker. The UDC, its owner, declined to move it to the Salem Cemetery after the city proposed it. On December 31, 2018, the city attorney sent a letter to the UDC saying that the monument is a threat to public safety and calling for its removal by January 31. "And if they don't, we're prepared to file legal action to achieve that removal", said Joines. The owner of the property, Clachan Properties, also asked the UDC to remove it. The local chapter of the UDC sued the city and county on May 4, 2020, claiming the city did not own the statue and did not have the right to remove it. On December 31, 2020, the state division of the UDC announced it was appealing to the North Carolina Supreme Court.

=== Ohio ===
- Columbus: On August 22, 2017, a Confederate statue at Camp Chase was damaged and its head stolen; it has since been repaired.
- Franklin: Confederate Gen. Robert E. Lee roadside plaque. Removed August 16–17, 2017.
- Willoughby: Willoughby South High School: In 2017, the school dropped its "Rebel" mascot—a man dressed in a gray Confederate military outfit—but kept the "Rebel" nickname.
- Worthington: An Ohio state historical marker outside the home where CSA Brigadier General Roswell S. Ripley was born was removed August 18, 2017.

=== Oklahoma ===
- Atoka: The Confederate Memorial Museum and Cemetery opened in 1986. In 2016, its name was changed to Atoka Museum and Civil War Cemetery.
- Tulsa: Robert E. Lee Elementary School, renamed Lee Elementary School in May 2018, then renamed Council Oak Elementary School in August 2018.

=== Pennsylvania ===
- "After removing a trio of Confederate historical markers an hour west of Gettysburg, the Pennsylvania Historical and Museum Commission has replaced two with significant revisions that view Confederate milestones through a more critical lens. ...In Pittsburgh, the commission took down a United Daughters of the Confederacy-backed plaque."

=== South Carolina ===
- Columbia: The Confederate battle flag was raised over the South Carolina statehouse in 1962 as a protest to desegregation. In 2000, the legislature voted to remove it and replace it with a flag on a flagpole in front of the Capitol as a monument. In 2015, the complete removal was approved by the required 2/3 majority of both houses of the Legislature. The flag was given to the South Carolina Confederate Relic Room & Military Museum.
- Charleston: On June 24, 2020, Charleston crews removed the John C. Calhoun statue from Marion Square using a large crane and specialized saws. The city council voted unanimously for its removal because of Calhoun's history as a prominent defender of slavery, as well as the fact that he was a key architect of the ideas that fueled Confederacy, a move sparked by nationwide racial justice protests. While the statue is currently in storage, a legal agreement will eventually allow a private group to re-erect it at a new location outside the city.
- Rock Hill: In 2017, the Confederate flag and pictures of Jackson and Lee were removed from the York County courthouse.

=== Tennessee ===
The 2016 Tennessee Heritage Protection Act puts "the brakes on cities' and counties' ability to remove monuments or change names of streets and parks".

- Crossville
  - South Cumberland Elementary School: Murals painted in 2003, one of a large Confederate battle flag and another showing the team's mascot, the Rebel, triumphantly holding a Confederate battle flag while a boy in a blue outfit is being lynched on a tree, were altered/removed in 2018 after it was discovered by the anti-hate organization located in Shelbyville.
- Franklin
  - The Forrest Crossing Golf Course, owned by the American Golf Corporation, changed its name to the Crossing Golf Course on September 22, 2017. It had been named after Confederate General and Klansman Nathan Bedford Forrest.

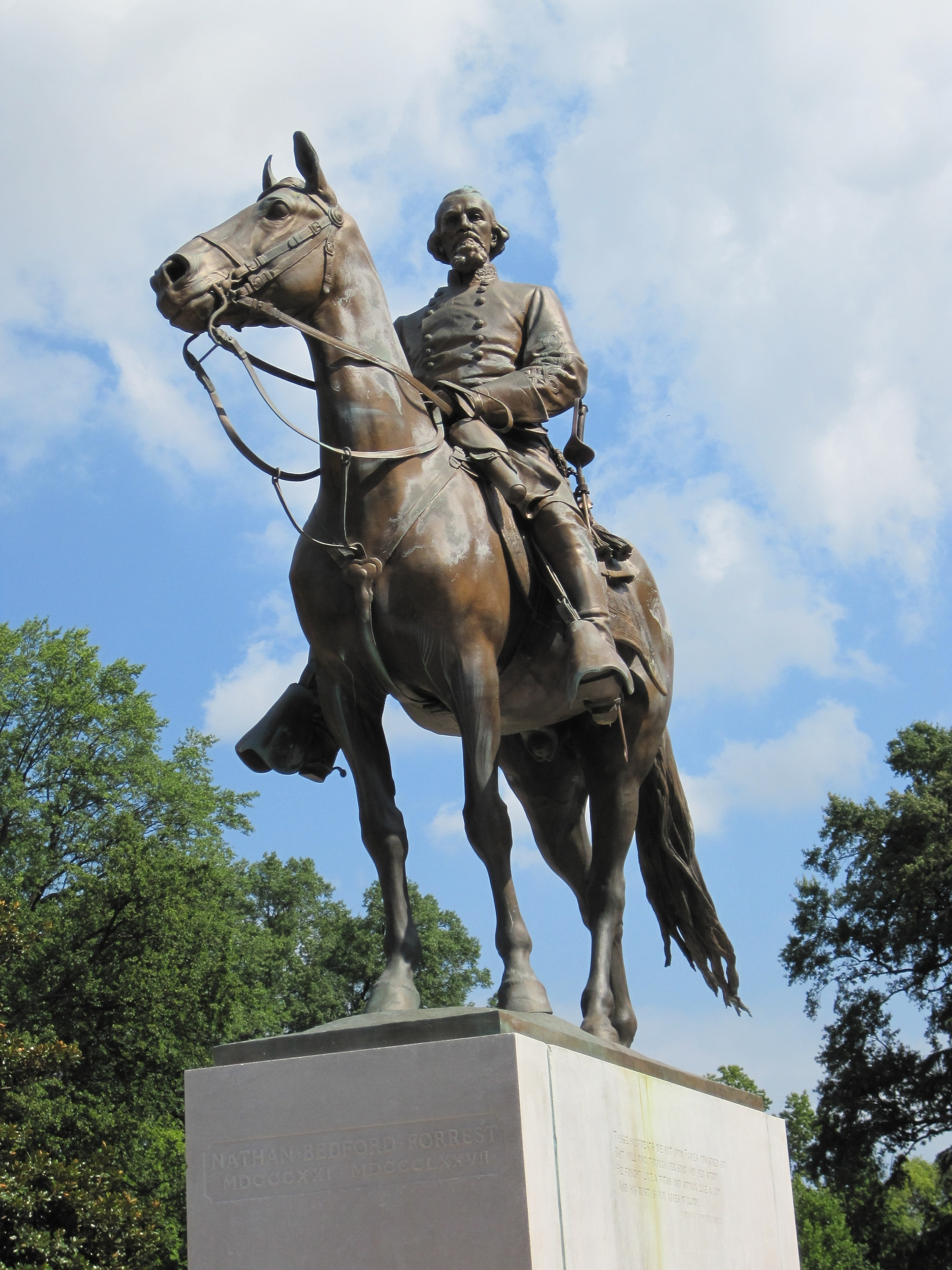
Removed statue of Nathan Bedford Forrest, Health Sciences Park (formerly Forrest Park), Memphis

- Memphis
  - Three Confederate-themed city parks were "hurriedly renamed" before the passage of the Tennessee Heritage Protection Act of 2013. Confederate Park (1908) was renamed Memphis Park; Jefferson Davis Park (1907) was renamed Mississippi River Park; and Forrest Park (1899) was renamed Health Sciences Park. The vote of the City Council was unanimous. At the time the monuments were dedicated, African Americans could not use those parks.
  - Jefferson Davis Monument in Memphis Park, 1904/1964. The city is suing the state to get it removed. It was removed under police guard on December 20, 2017.
  - Nathan Bedford Forrest Monument commissioned 1901, dedicated 1905, was installed thanks in part to Judge Thomas J. Latham's wife. It was located in the former Nathan Bedford Forrest Park, renamed Health Sciences Park in 2015. Memphis City Council officials were unanimous in seeking to have the statues removed, but were blocked by the Tennessee Historical Commission under the Tennessee Heritage Protection Act. After exploring legal remedies, the city of Memphis decided to sell the two parks to a new non-profit, Memphis Greenspace, whose president was a county commissioner, for $1,000 each. Memphis Greenspace removed the statue, under police guard, the same day, December 20, 2017. The Sons of Confederate Veterans sued the city, but their suit was unsuccessful. In June 2021, Forrest's and his wife's remains began to be removed from Health Sciences Park to be reinterred on private land.
  - Statue of J. Harvey Mathes, Confederate Captain, removed December 20, 2017.
- Murfreesboro
  - Forrest Hall (ROTC building), Middle Tennessee State University: In 2006, the frieze depicting General Forrest on horseback that had adorned the side of this building was removed amid protests, but a major push to change its name failed. Also, the university's Blue Raiders' athletic mascot was changed to a pegasus from a cavalier, in order to avoid association with General Forrest.

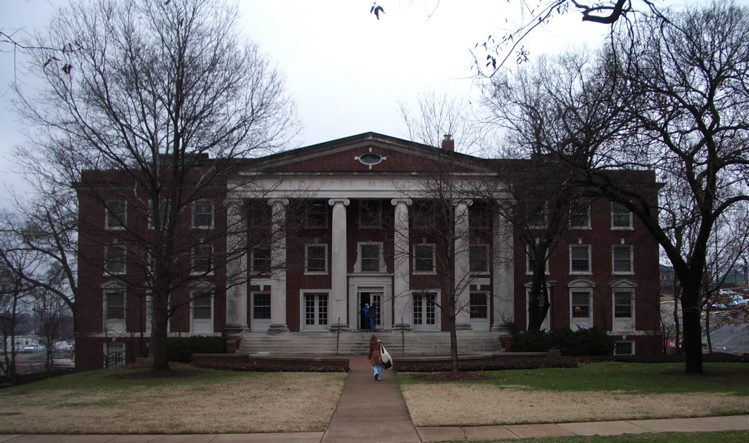
Confederate Memorial Hall, now known as Memorial Hall, Vanderbilt University

- Nashville
  - Confederate Memorial Hall, Vanderbilt University, was renamed Memorial Hall on August 15, 2016. Since the building "was built on the back of a $50,000 donation from the United Daughters of the Confederacy in 1933", the university returned to them its 2017 equivalent, $1.2 million. "Michael Schoenfeld, Vanderbilt's vice chancellor for public affairs, said he and other university officials had gotten death threats over his school's decision."
  - On June 4, 2020, Montgomery Bell Academy announced plans to remove the statue of Sam Davis (1999), which were executed a few days later.
  - The Nathan Bedford Forrest Bust was removed from the Tennessee State Capitol on July 23, 2021, and installed in the Tennessee State Museum three days later.
  - Nathan Bedford Forrest Statue near Interstate 65 was removed on December 7, 2021.
- Sewanee (Sewanee: The University of the South):
  - Confederate flags were removed from the Chapel in the mid-1990s "reportedly to improve acoustics".
  - A portrait of Leonidas Polk was moved from Convocation Hall to Archives and Special Collections in 2015. However "two other portraits of Polk currently hang in different locations on campus. One can easily find Polk's image and influence all over Sewanee."
  - Kirby-Smith Monument (1940). Smith was, after the war, a Sewanee professor of botany and mathematics. Plinth marked with "Elevate People of Color" and "Elevate Women" in 2018. Removed to Graveyard in 2018, at request of Smith's descendants.

=== Texas ===
- Arlington:
  - Six Flags Over Texas theme park: In August 2017, it removed the Stars and Bars Confederate Flag, after flying it for 56 years with the other flags that have flown over Texas. In the 1990s, the park renamed the Confederacy section the Old South section and removed all Confederate battle flags.
  - University of Texas at Arlington changed its sports mascot from Rebels to Mavericks "in the 1970s".
- Austin:
  - Children of the Confederacy plaque, installed in 1959 inside the State Capitol, bore the words that "the War Between the States was not a rebellion, nor was its underlying cause to sustain slavery." The plaque was removed between January 11 and 13, 2019 after a unanimous vote by the Texas State Preservation Board, chaired by Governor Greg Abbott. Calls for its removal started in 2017 by then-House Speaker Joe Straus, in a letter to the State Preservation Board that oversees the Capitol grounds, in which he was joined by 40 other lawmakers.
  - The Texas Confederate Museum closed in 1988. Opened in 1903 in a room on the first floor of the Capital, it moved in 1920 to the adjacent Old Land Office Building, where it remained until 1998, much longer than the building had been used by the Land Office. When the building was vacated for renovation, the Museum was not permitted to return. (The building is now the Capital Visitors Center.) It never reopened as it never found another home. Its collections are now divided between the Haley Memorial Library and History Center in Midland and the Texas Civil War Museum in White Settlement, a suburb of Fort Worth.
  - Robert E. Lee Elementary School (1939) was renamed for local photographer Russell Lee in 2016. He was a prominent photographer with the Farm Security Administration and the first Professor of Photography at the University of Texas.
  - Johnston High School: Named for Albert Sidney Johnston, Confederate general killed in the Battle of Shiloh. The school closed in 2008; the Liberal Arts and Science Academy is now (2021) at that location.
  - Jeff Davis Avenue. The Austin City Council voted unanimously to rename the street for William Holland, born a slave, an educator who served one term in the Texas Legislature and became a Travis County commissioner.
  - Robert E. Lee Road. The Austin City Council voted unanimously to rename the street, whose signs had been defaced, for Azie Morton, the only African American to hold the office of Treasurer of the United States.
  - University of Texas
    - In May 2015, the student government at the University of Texas at Austin voted almost unanimously to remove a statue of Jefferson Davis that had been erected on the campus's South Mall. Beginning shortly after the Charleston church shooting of June 2015, "Black Lives Matter" was written repeatedly in bold red letters on the base of the statue. Previous messages had included "Davis must fall" and "Liberate U.T." (the University of Texas). The University of Texas officials convened a task force to determine whether to honor the students' petition for removal of the statue. Acting on the strong recommendation of the task force, UT's President Gregory L. Fenves announced on August 13, 2015, that the statue would be moved to serve as an educational exhibit in the university's Dolph Briscoe Center for American History museum. He said: "it is not in the university's best interest to continue commemorating him [Davis] on our Main Mall." Legal action by the Sons of Confederate Veterans was unsuccessful. The statue was removed on August 30, 2015.
    - After the removal of the Jefferson Davis statue in 2015, there were four remaining Confederate statues left on the South Mall at the University of Texas, portraying Generals Robert E. Lee and Albert Sidney Johnston, and Confederate Postmaster John H. Reagan. They were dedicated in 1933. On August 20–21, 2017, the university removed the three Confederate statues from the Austin campus grounds and moved them to a museum. The decision was inspired by the Unite the Right rally on August 10–11 in Charlottesville. At the same time, a statue of Texas Governor Jim Hogg was also removed, although he had no direct link with the Confederacy. In 2018, it was announced that it would be reinstalled at a different location.
  - IDEA Allan School, a charter school, was renamed IDEA Montopolis in 2018. It had been named for Confederate Army officer John T. Allan. Four other related properties in Austin are being similarly renamed.
  - In 2019, Lanier High School was renamed Navarro High School to honor 2007 graduate Juan Navarro, a U.S. Army officer killed in Afghanistan. Sidney Lanier, the "poet of the Confederacy", served as a private in the CSA.

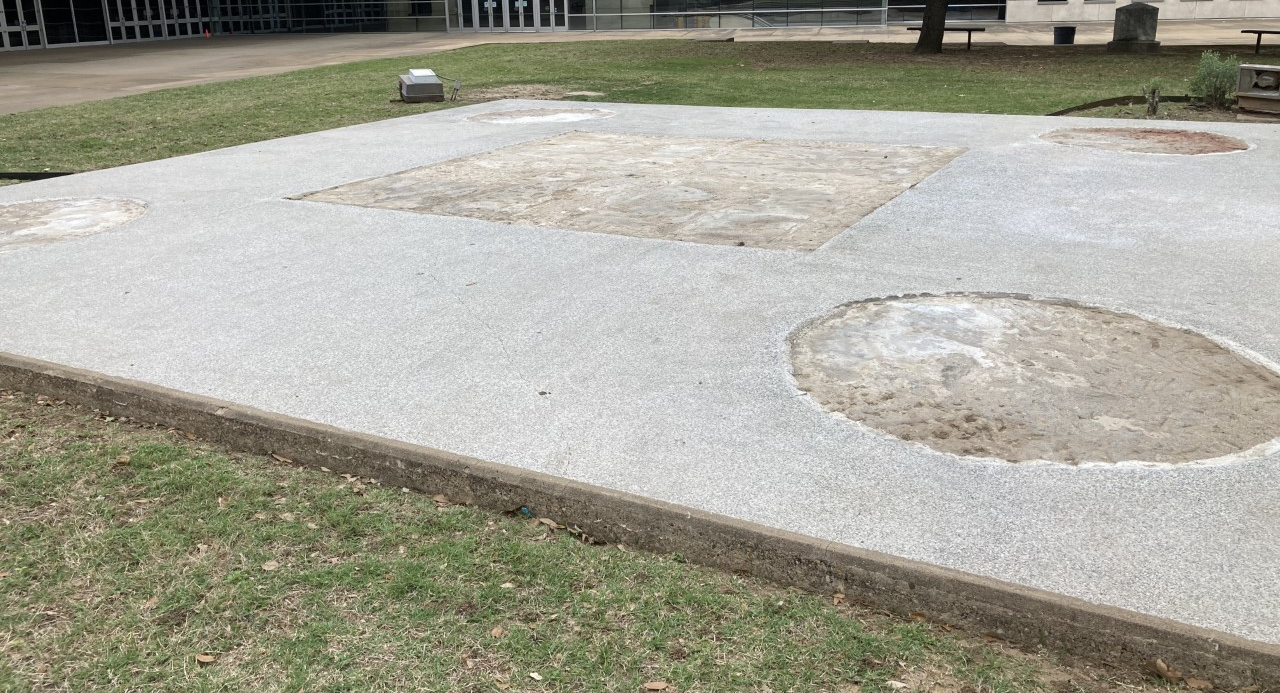
Empty slab after the Confederate War Memorial monument was removed in 2020

- Dallas:
  - Removal of the Confederate War Memorial in Dallas was approved by the Dallas City Council in February 2019, but a citizens' group filed lawsuits, and the planned removal was blocked indefinitely later that year by the Fifth Court of Appeals of Texas. On June 11, 2020, the city filed an emergency motion for immediate permission to remove the monument, citing possible serious injury to protesters if the monument were to be toppled during a planned rally at the site. It was removed on June 24, 2020.
  - In 2016, the John B. Hood Middle School renamed itself, with the concurrence of the Dallas Independent School District Board of Trustees, as the Piedmont Global Academy.

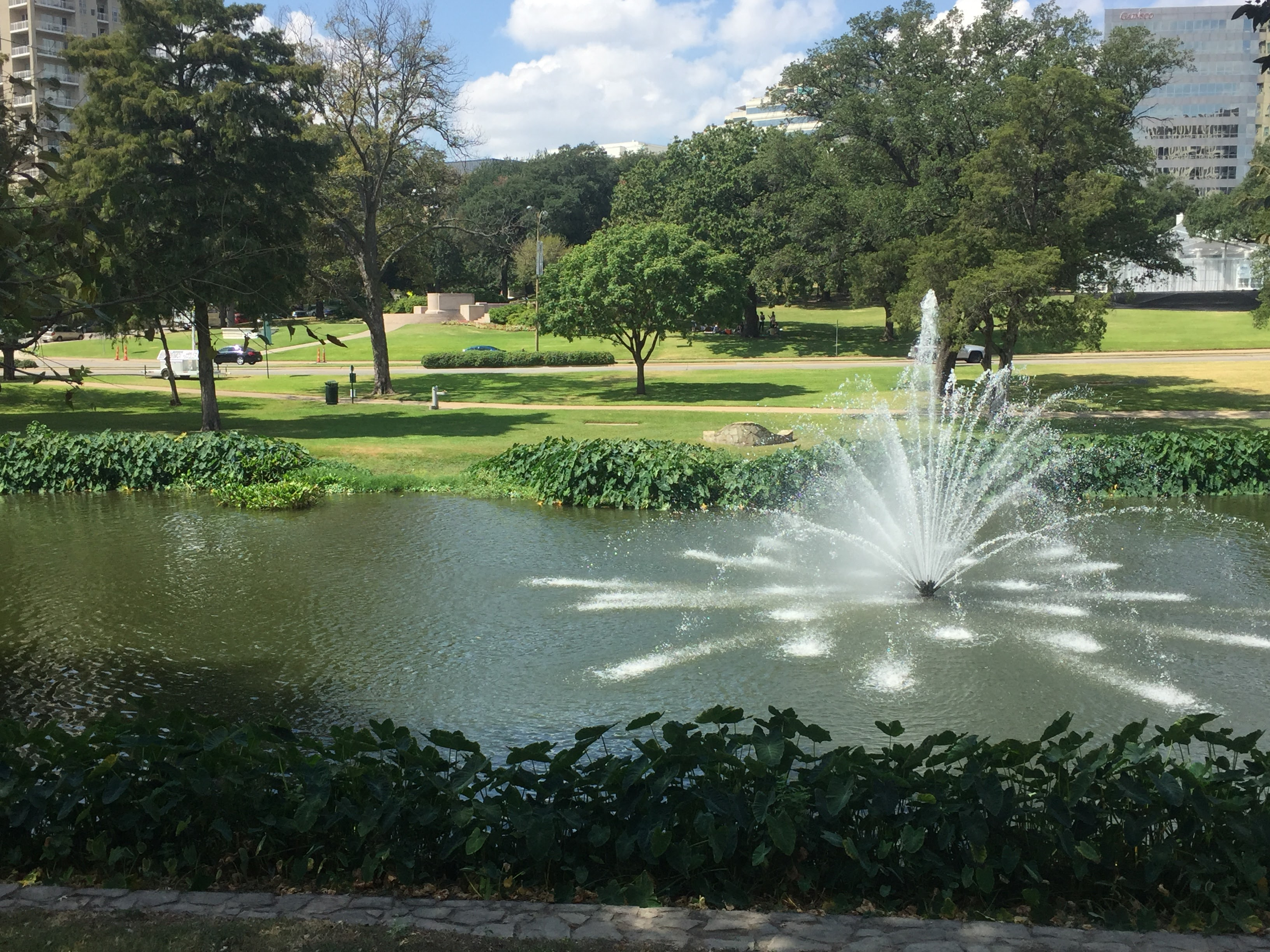
Turtle Creek Park in 2017, the empty plinth of the removed statue of Robert E. Lee can be seen in the background

  - The Robert E. Lee statue in Lee Park along Turtle Creek Boulevard, dedicated in 1936 to celebrate the Texas Centennial Exposition, was removed on September 14, 2017, after the City Council voted 13–1 in favor of removal. The city considered lending it to the Texas Civil War Museum in White Settlement, the only local institution willing to accept it, but declined because it would not be displayed in a historical context the Dallas City Commission found acceptable. In June 2019, the city sold it in an online auction for $1,435,000, on condition that it not be displayed in the Dallas–Fort Worth area.
  - Thomas Jefferson High School's sports mascot changed from Rebels to Patriots "in the 1970s".
  - William L. Cabell Elementary School, named after William Lewis Cabell, was renamed Chapel Hill Preparatory in 2018.
  - Stonewall Jackson Elementary School (1939) in Lower Greenville was renamed Mockingbird Elementary School in 2018, after Mockingbird Lane on which it is located.
  - Robert E. Lee Elementary School was renamed Geneva Heights Elementary School in 2018.
  - Robert E. Lee Park: The park was temporarily renamed "Oak Lawn Park" until a permanent name could be approved. In 2019, the Dallas Park Board gave the park its new permanent name, Turtle Creek Park
  - Lee, Gano (Richard Montgomery Gano), Stonewall, Beauregard, and Cabell (William Lewis Cabell, mayor of Dallas) streets are currently named for Confederate generals. They will be renamed at a future date.
- Fort Worth:
  - Granite marker remembering pioneer banker and Confederate soldier K. M. Van Zandt, after the war commander of the trans-Mississippi division of the United Confederate Veterans. Removed on August 18, 2017, and given to the Texas Civil War Museum in White Settlement, Texas, a Fort Worth suburb.
  - Granite marker remembering a violent east Texas Ku Klux Klansman, Confederate Colonel H.P. "Hinchie" Mabry. Removed on August 18, 2017, and given to the Texas Civil War Museum.
  - Southwest High School's sports logo changed from Rebels to Raiders "in the 1980s".
  - Richland High School (North Richland Hills, Texas) formerly had the Confederate flag painted on the floor of the gymnasium.
- Gainesville:
  - Gainesville City Council members voted unanimously to remove a Confederate statue from the town's Leonard Park. The statue was removed in 2021. Another statue, on the town's courthouse lawn, was retained by the County Commissioners.
- Garland:
  - South Garland High School removed various Confederate symbols in 2015. A floor tile mosaic donated by the Class of 1968 and a granite sign in front of the school were replaced. Both had incorporated the Confederate flag, which was part of the school's original coat of arms. In addition, the district has dropped "Dixie" as the tune for the school fight song. The school changed its Colonel mascot's uniform from Confederate gray to red and blue in 1991.
- Houston:
  - Dowling Street. Named for Confederate commander Richard W. Dowling. Renamed Emancipation Avenue in 2017. The street leads to Emancipation Park. The site originally was the only municipal park available to blacks, who pooled their money in 1872 to buy the property to celebrate their freedom.
  - In 2016, Jackson Middle School was renamed for Hispanic community activist Yolanda Black Navarro.
  - Lee High School (1962). Originally known as Robert E. Lee High School, district leaders dropped the "Robert E." from the school's title to distance the school from the Confederate general. School officials changed the name to Margaret Long Wisdom High School in 2016.
  - Westbury High School changed the nickname of its athletic teams from the "Rebels" to the "Huskies".
- Lakeside, Tarrant County
  - The "smallest Confederate monument", two small Confederate flags, was removed from Confederate Park in August 2017.
- Midland:
  - Prior to 2002, the Commemorative Air Force was the Confederate Air Force.
  - In October 2020, the Midland Independent School District voted 5-2 to rename Robert E. Lee High School to Legacy High School. In August 2025, the Board voted 4-3 to change the name back to Lee High School.
- San Antonio:
  - Confederate Soldiers' Monument, dedicated April 28, 1899, located in Travis Park next to The Alamo. Removed September 1, 2017.
  - Robert E. Lee High School renamed LEE (Legacy of Education Excellence) High School, reportedly to preserve the school's history and minimize the expense of renaming, in 2017.

=== Utah ===
- St. George
  - **Dixie State University** was renamed in 2022 to Utah Tech University.
    - Name of yearbook changed from "The Dixie" to "The Confederate" in 1966, then to "Dixie College Yearbook" in 1994.
    - University dropped the Confederate battle flag as a school symbol, 1995
    - Rodney the Rebel Mascot dropped in 2005
    - Rebels nickname dropped 2007 (Changed briefly to Red Storm, now Trailblazers)
    - Confederate statue The Rebels (1983; removed 2012.)
    - Dormitory buildings named after Confederate battle, "Shiloh Hall", Torn down in 2019.
  - Dixie Regional Medical Center renamed as Intermountain St. George Regional Hospital

=== Vermont ===
- Brattleboro:
  - Brattleboro Union High School. Until 2004, the school mascot was Colonel Reb, a Confederate plantation owner.
- South Burlington:
  - South Burlington High School Confederate themed Captain Rebel mascot (1961), use of the Confederate Battle Flag, and playing of Dixie almost immediately sparked controversy during the Civil Rights era and every decade since. The school board voted to retain the name in 2015 but to change it in 2017. "The Rebel Alliance", a community group opposed to changing the mascot has led two successful efforts to defeat the school budget in public votes as a protest. The students choose the "Wolves" and rebranding is proceeding.

=== Virginia ===
- Statewide
  - Confederate History Month (April) last celebrated in 2000.
  - Lee-Jackson Day (January 17) was last celebrated in 2020. On February 6, 2020, Virginia passed legislation ending celebration of Lee-Jackson day: a state holiday commemorating Robert E. Lee and Thomas "Stonewall" Jackson. The holiday was replaced with Election Day and signed into law by Virginia Governor Ralph Northam.
- Alexandria
  - In 2017, a portrait of Robert E. Lee (born in Alexandria) that hung in the City Council chambers was moved to the Lyceum, a local history museum.
  - In 2017, the Vestry of Christ Church (Alexandria) voted unanimously to remove from the sanctuary plaques honoring Washington and Lee, placed there just after Lee's death in 1870, saying they "make some in our presence feel unsafe or unwelcome".
  - In 2017, "[a] hotel on King Street removed a plaque that had been bolted to the wall of the building for decades and gave an incomplete account of the first war-related deaths after the Union invaded Alexandria on May 24, 1861. The marker, posted in 1929 by the Sons and Daughters of Confederate Veterans, memorialized the first Southerner killed by the Union, belying the fact that he had first shot and killed a Northern colonel on the property."
  - In 2020, the Appomattox statue (1899) was removed. Dedicated to the Confederate dead and placed in the middle of the intersection of Washington and Prince Streets, in 2016 the mayor and city council voted unanimously for it to be moved to a museum. The statue was removed and put into storage in June 2020 by its owners, the United Daughters of the Confederacy.
- Arlington County
  - Jefferson Davis Highway (U.S. 1) was renamed Richmond Highway in 2019.
  - Arlington County announced in December 2020 that Robert E. Lee's former home, Arlington House, was being removed from its icon and seal, "primarily because it was built by enslaved people and later owned by Lee, who led the Confederate Army during the Civil War".
  - As of December 18, 2023, a Confederate monument in Arlington National Cemetery was scheduled to be removed by the end of the week. Governor Glenn Youngkin requested that the statue be preserved at a museum operated by the Virginia Military Institute.
- Bowling Green
  - Confederate Monument (1906). On August 25, 2020, the Caroline County Board of Supervisors voted unanimously to remove the monument.
- Charlottesville
  - Lee Park, the setting for an equestrian statue of Robert E. Lee, was renamed Emancipation Park on February 6, 2017. In July 2018 it was renamed again, to Market Street Park.
  - On February 6, 2017, the Charlottesville City Council also voted to remove the equestrian statue of Lee. In April, the City Council voted to sell the statue. In May a six-month court injunction staying the removal was issued as a result of legal action by the Sons of Confederate Veterans and others. The prospect of removal, as well as the park renaming, brought numerous white supremacists, neo-Nazis, and other alt-right figures to the Unite the Right rally of August 2017, in which there were three fatalities. In June 2016 the pedestal had been spray painted with the words "Black Lives Matter", and overnight between July 7 and 8, 2017, it was vandalized by being daubed in red paint. On August 20, 2017, the City Council unanimously voted to shroud the statue, and that of Stonewall Jackson, in black. The Council "also decided to direct the city manager to take an administrative step that would make it easier to eventually remove the Jackson statue". The statues were covered in black shrouds on August 23, 2017. By order of a judge, the shrouds were removed in February 2018. After enabling legislation was signed by Governor Ralph Northam in April 2020, and following a 2021 Virginia Supreme Court ruling against opponents of removal, the Lee statue was removed on July 11, 2021. The statue was melted down in October 2023.
  - On September 6, 2017, the city council voted to remove a statue of Confederate Gen. Thomas "Stonewall" Jackson from Emancipation Park. The statue was removed on July 11, 2021.
  - Jackson Park, named for Stonewall Jackson, was renamed Justice Park. In July 2018, it was renamed a second time, to Court Square Park.
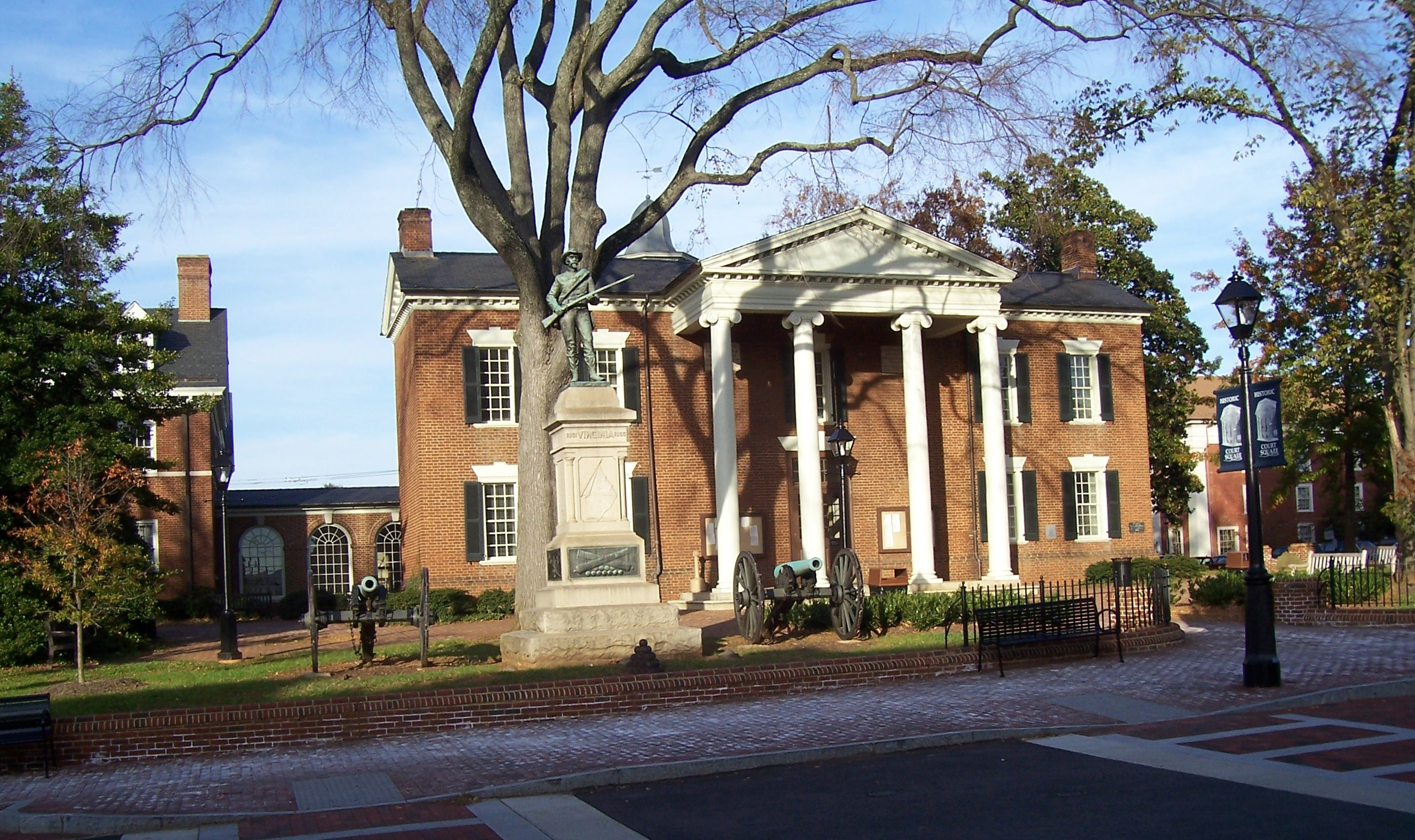
    Albemarle County Courthouse and Confederate monument, 2010
  - The University of Virginia Board of Visitors (trustees) voted unanimously to remove two plaques from the university's Rotunda that honored students and alumni who fought and died for the Confederacy in the Civil War. The University also agreed "to acknowledge a $1,000 gift in 1921 from the Ku Klux Klan and contribute the amount, adjusted for inflation, to a suitable cause".
  - On September 12, 2020, At Ready, a statue of a Confederate soldier in front of the Albemarle County courthouse in Charlottesville, where it had stood since 1909, was taken down after a unanimous vote of the Albemarle County Board of Supervisors. A cannon and pyramid of cannonballs were also removed.
- Doswell
  - Major amusement park Kings Dominion operated the popular "Rebel Yell" roller coaster from the park's 1975 opening until 2017. The ride's name referenced the "Rebel yell", a battle cry used by Confederate soldiers during the Civil War. On February 2, 2018, the park announced that the attraction would be renamed to "Racer 75" beginning in the 2018 season, although Kings Dominion did not comment on the relationship between the name change and the previous name's Confederate roots in its press release.
- Fairfax County
  - Former J. E. B. Stuart High School reopened as Justice High School in September 2018. The school is near Munson Hill, Stuart's headquarters. It was given Stuart's name in 1958 as part of the county's "massive resistance" against the U.S. Supreme Court order to end racial segregation of public schools.
  - Former Robert E. Lee High School in Springfield was renamed John R. Lewis High School on July 23, 2020, effective for the 2020/2021 school year.
  - A statue dedicated to John Quincy Marr, the first Confederate officer killed in the Civil War during the Battle of Fairfax Court House (June 1861), was removed after a vote by the Fairfax County Board of Supervisors in October 2020.
- Farmville
  - A statue of a Confederate private soldier and its granite pedestal, known as "Virginia Defenders of State Sovereignty Confederate Soldier Monument," were removed from the intersection of High and Randolph Streets on June 19, 2020.
- Front Royal
  - The segregation academy John S. Mosby Academy, named for Confederate hero John S. Mosby, was founded in 1959 as an all-white school. It closed in 1969.
- Hampton
  - Robert E. Lee Elementary School, closed 2010.
  - Jefferson Davis Memorial Park (1956). Dedicated by UDC, the park commemorated the CSA president's two years of imprisonment in Fort Monroe. Lettering was removed from the arch in 2019.

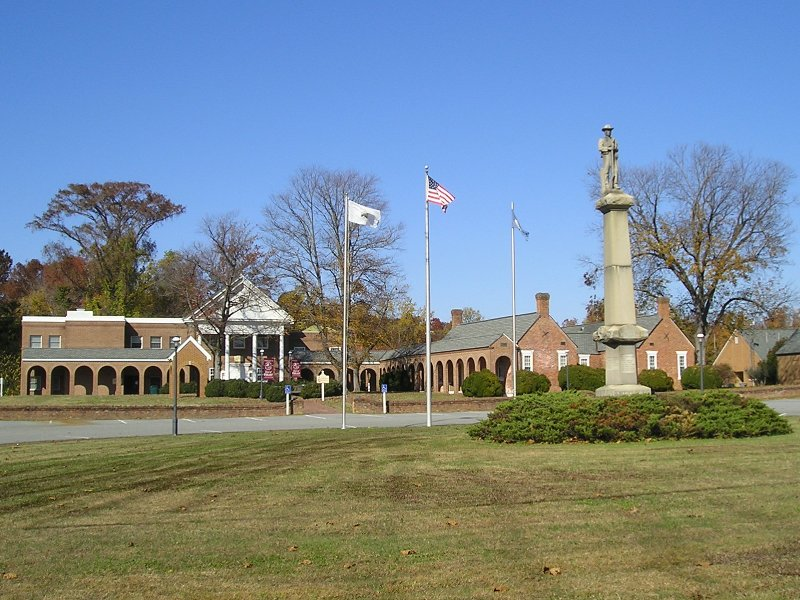
Old Isle of Wight County Courthouse, with former Confederate memorial statue

- Isle of Wight
  - A generic "Johnny Reb" statue and its base, referring to "Confederate Dead", were removed from in front of the former Isle of Wight County Courthouse on May 8, 2021.
- Leesburg
  - The statue of a Confederate private soldier, named the "Silent Sentinel", was removed from the grounds of the Loudoun County Courthouse on July 21, 2020, and returned to the United Daughters of the Confederacy.
- Lexington
  - In 2011, the City Council passed an ordinance to ban the flying of flags other than the United States flag, the Virginia Flag, and an as-yet-undesigned city flag on city light poles. Various flags of the Confederacy had previously been flown on city light poles to commemorate the Virginia holiday Lee–Jackson Day, which was formerly observed on the Friday before Martin Luther King, Jr. Day. About 300 Confederate flag supporters, including members of the Sons of Confederate Veterans, rallied before the City Council meeting, and after the vote the Sons of Confederate Veterans vowed to challenge the new local ordinance in court. Court challenges have not been successful and the ordinance remains in effect. The city tried to prevent individuals from flying Confederate flags on their own property, but a 1993 federal injunction blocked effort.
  - On the campus of Washington and Lee University, a large Confederate battle flag and a number of related flags were removed from the Lee Chapel in 2014.
  - Close to Lee Chapel is the older Grace Episcopal Church, where Lee attended. In 1903 the church was renamed the R. E. Lee Memorial Church. In 2017, the church changed its name back to Grace Episcopal Church.
  - On September 3, 2020, the Lexington City Council voted to rename Stonewall Jackson Cemetery to Oak Grove Cemetery. Jackson is buried in the cemetery.
  - Virginia Military Institute (VMI) removed a statue of Confederate General Stonewall Jackson, a former VMI professor, on December 7, 2020. The statue is to be moved to a Civil War museum on a battlefield where VMI cadets and alumni were killed or wounded.
- Lynchburg
  - A statue of Confederate veteran George Morgan Jones was removed from the Randolph College grounds on August 25, 2017.
- Manassas
  - Stonewall Middle School (1974) was renamed Unity Braxton Middle School in 2020.
  - Stonewall Jackson High School (1973) was renamed Unity Reed High School in 2020.
- Norfolk
  - In 2020, the city removed the statue atop the Norfolk Confederate Monument (1907) and put it into storage, pending the dismantling of the rest of the monument.
  - In June 2020 the City of Norfolk removed the long standing historical marker commemorating Father Abram Ryan "The Poet Priest of the Confederacy" which had stood on the corner of Tidewater and Lafayette Boulevard for 85 years.
- Petersburg: Three schools were renamed effective July 1, 2018. A $20,000 private donation covered the costs.
  - A.P. Hill Elementary became Cool Spring Elementary
  - Robert E. Lee Elementary became Lakemont Elementary
  - J.E.B. Stuart Elementary became Pleasants Lane Elementary.
- Portsmouth
  - The Confederate Monument, located in the town square. Local politicians had been contemplating the fate of the monument since 2015, in 2017 the town's mayor announced that it would be moved to a cemetery, and in 2018 courts were involved to determine who owned it. In June 2020, protesters beheaded several of the statues and tore one down, injuring a man in the process. The city covered up the monument as they tried to figure out if, and when, they could move the remainder.
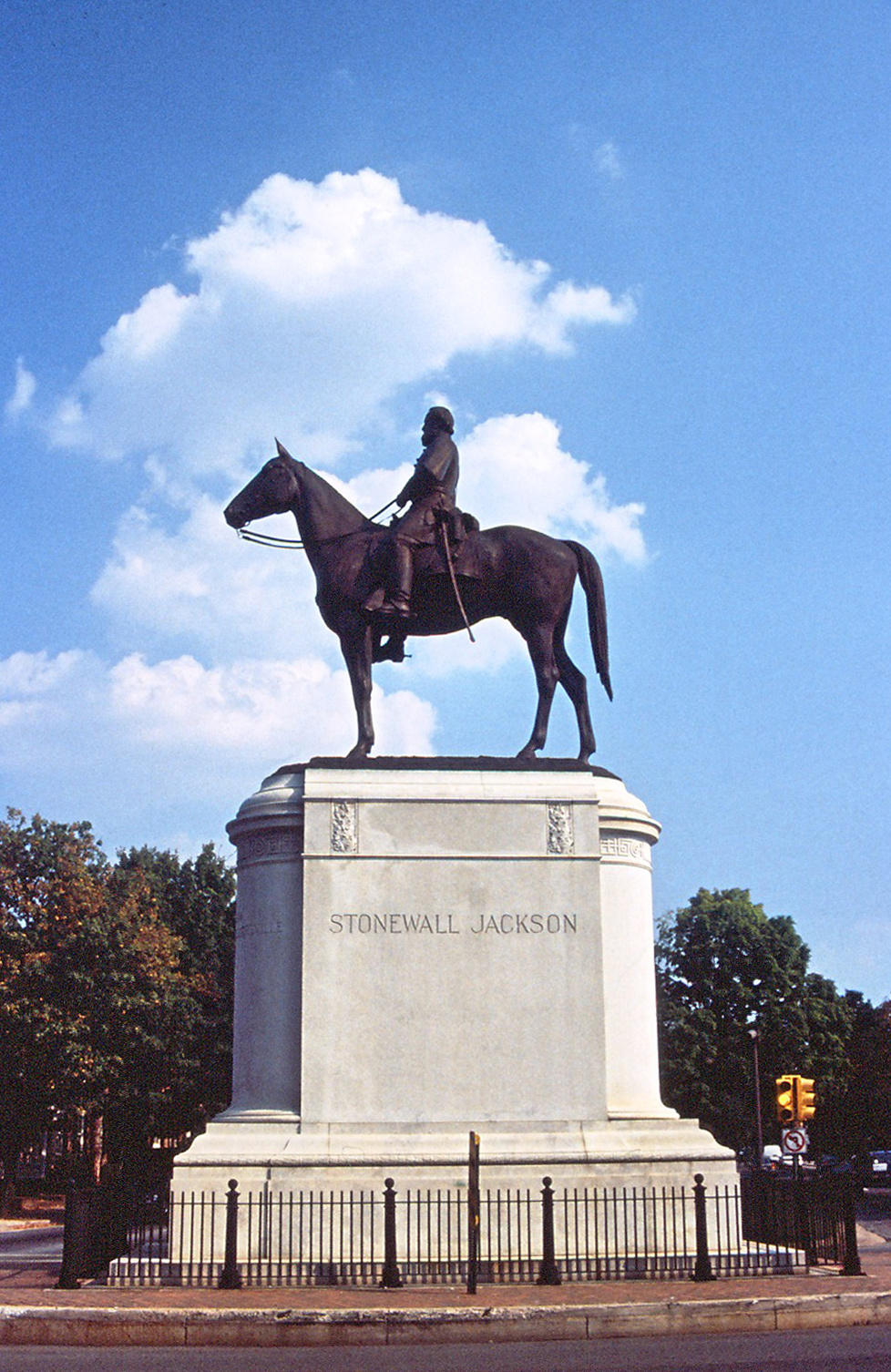
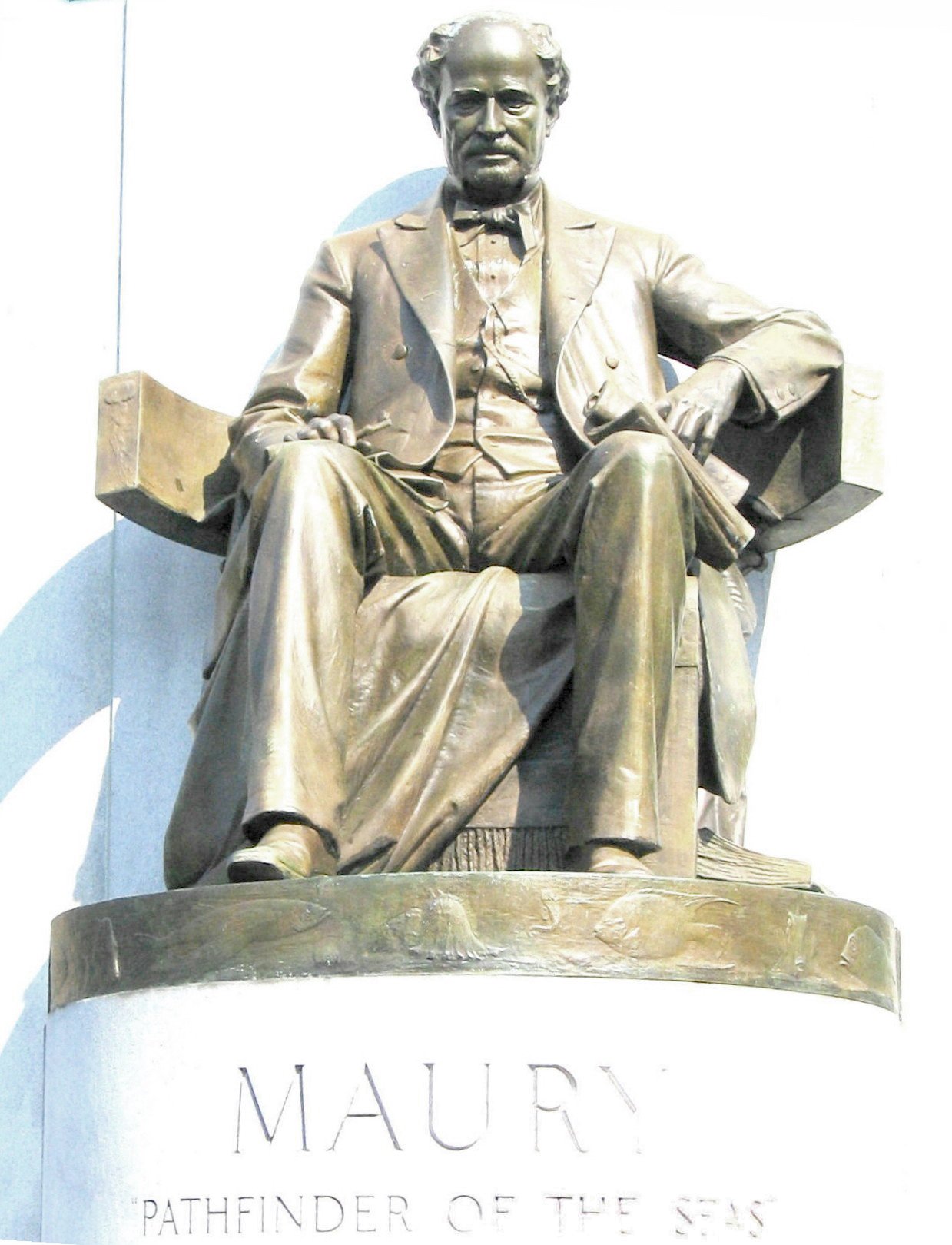
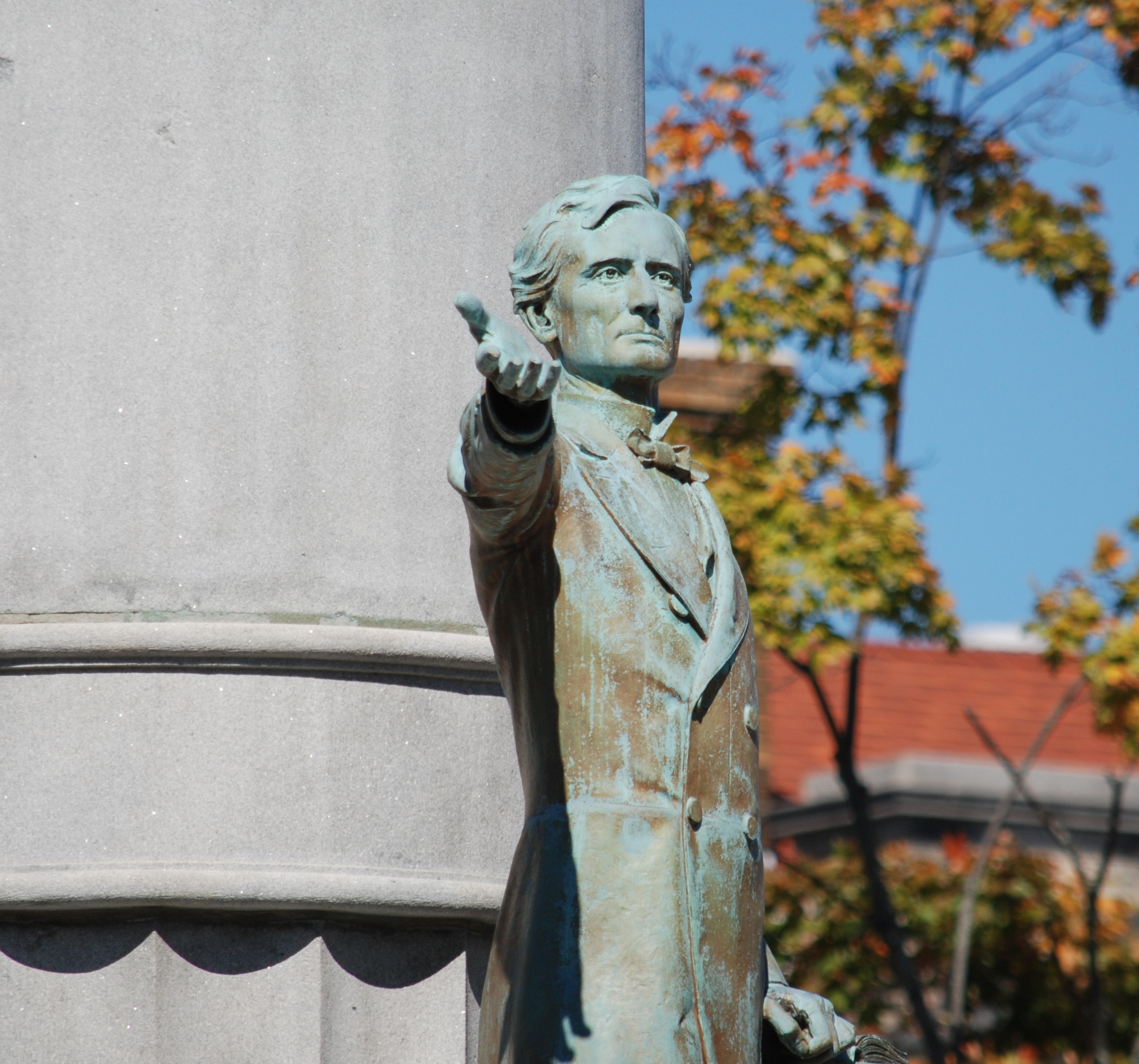
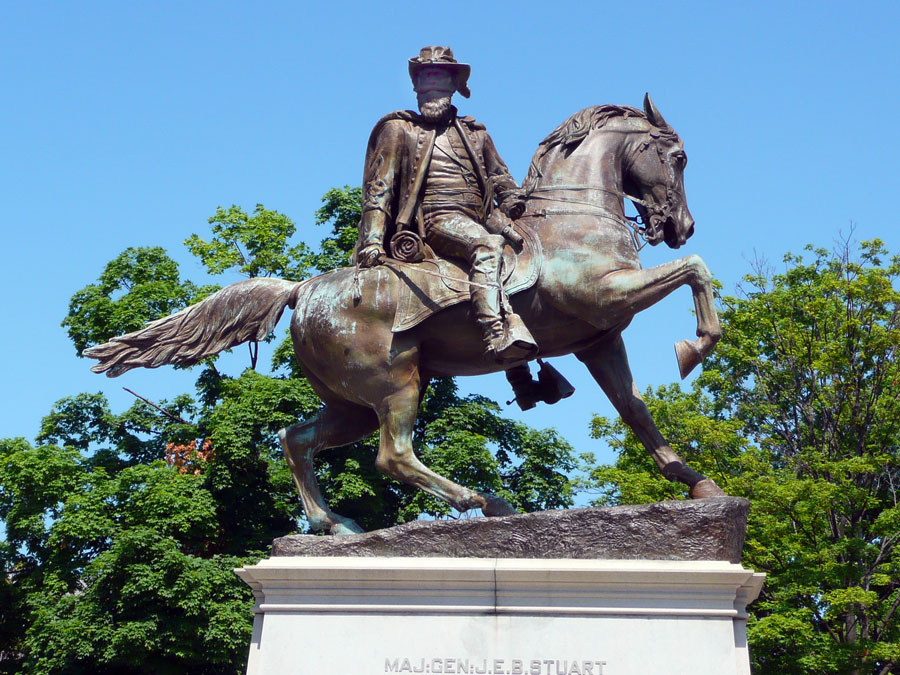
The removed statues on Monument Avenue, Richmond, clockwise from top left: Stonewall Jackson, Matthew Fontaine Maury, J. E. B. Stuart and Jefferson Davis.

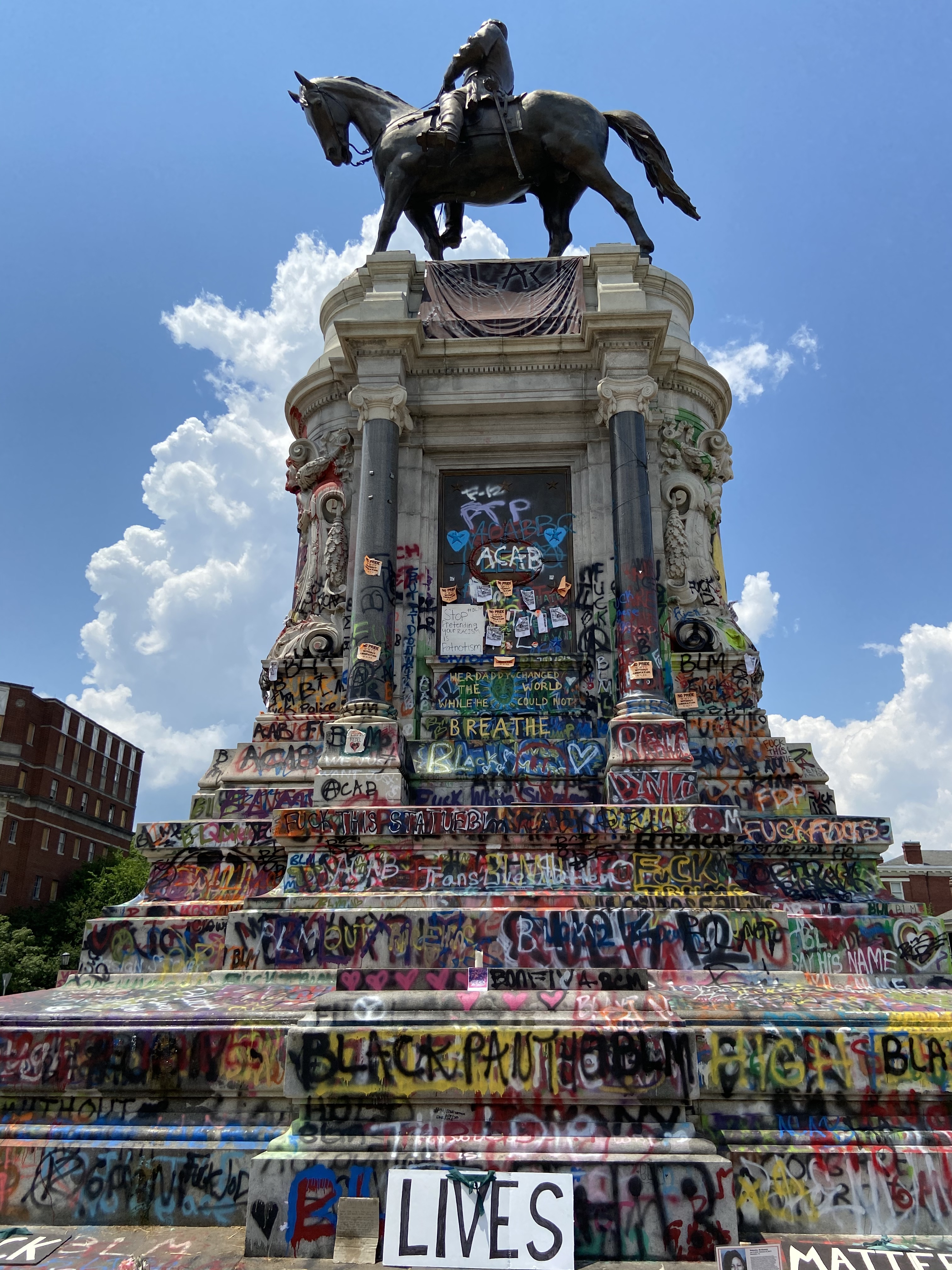
Defaced Lee Monument, Richmond, before removal in 2021

- Richmond
  - In February 2000, the City Council voted to change the names of the J. E. B. Stuart and Thomas J. "Stonewall" Jackson bridges, which cross the James River, to the names of Samuel Tucker and Curtis Holt, two local notables in the civil rights movement.
  - In 2018, J.E.B. Stuart Elementary School (1922) was renamed Barack Obama Elementary School in 2018.
  - Monument Avenue
    - 2020
      - On June 10, 2020, protesters in the movement protesting the murder of George Floyd tore down the Jefferson Davis Memorial. It had been marked with "Black Lives Matter" in 2015.
      - On July 1, 2020, the first day possible under a new statute, the city removed the Stonewall Jackson Monument (1919), by sculptor Frederick William Sievers.
      - On July 2, 2020, the statue of Matthew Fontaine Maury (1929), also by Sievers, was removed by the city.
      - On July 7, 2020, the city removed the J. E. B. Stuart Monument (1907) by Frederick Moynihan.
    - 2021
      - On September 8, 2021, the Robert E. Lee Monument (1890) by Antonin Mercié was removed at the direction of the state government.
    - 2022
      - On December 12, 2022, the A.P. Hill Monument by Caspar Buberl (1892) was removed by the city. Hill's remains, located inside the monument, were reinterred in Fairview Cemetery in Culpeper.
  - On June 6, 2020, the Statue of Williams Carter Wickham (1891) in Monroe Park was toppled from its platform by Black Lives Matter protesters.
  - On June 16, 2020, the Howitzer Monument (1892) by sculptor Caspar Buberl was torn down by Black Lives Matter protesters.
  - On July 8, 2020, the statue on top of the Confederate Soldiers and Sailors memorial in the Libby Hill district was removed by the city.
  - Busts of Robert E. Lee and eight other Confederate leaders were removed from the Old House Chamber in the Virginia State Capitol building on July 23, 2020.
  - A statue of Lieutenant General A. P. Hill was taken down from the center of the Laburnum Avenue and Hermitage Road intersection on December 12, 2022, by the City of Richmond, completing the removal of statues of Confederate officers in the former capital of the Confederacy
  - In August 2026, three confederate statues were removed without any prior announcement. A line item had been added to a budget passed in a Virginia General Assembly bill "to facilitate the removal of all Confederate monuments and memorials from Capitol Square."
- Roanoke
  - Stonewall Jackson Middle School was renamed John P. Fishwick Middle School in July 2018.
  - In July 2020, the Robert E. Lee Memorial in Lee Plaza was removed by the city. Lee Plaza, in which the memorial stood, was renamed Lacks Plaza after Henrietta Lacks.
- Staunton
  - Robert E. Lee High School (1967), was renamed Staunton High School in 2018/2019.

=== Washington (state) ===
- Bellingham:
  - Pickett Bridge, commemorating an earlier wooden bridge erected by US Army Capt. Pickett over Whatcom Creek. Sign erected in 1920, was removed August 18, 2017, along with signs leading to Pickett House. Signs leading to Pickett House were put back up September 2017.

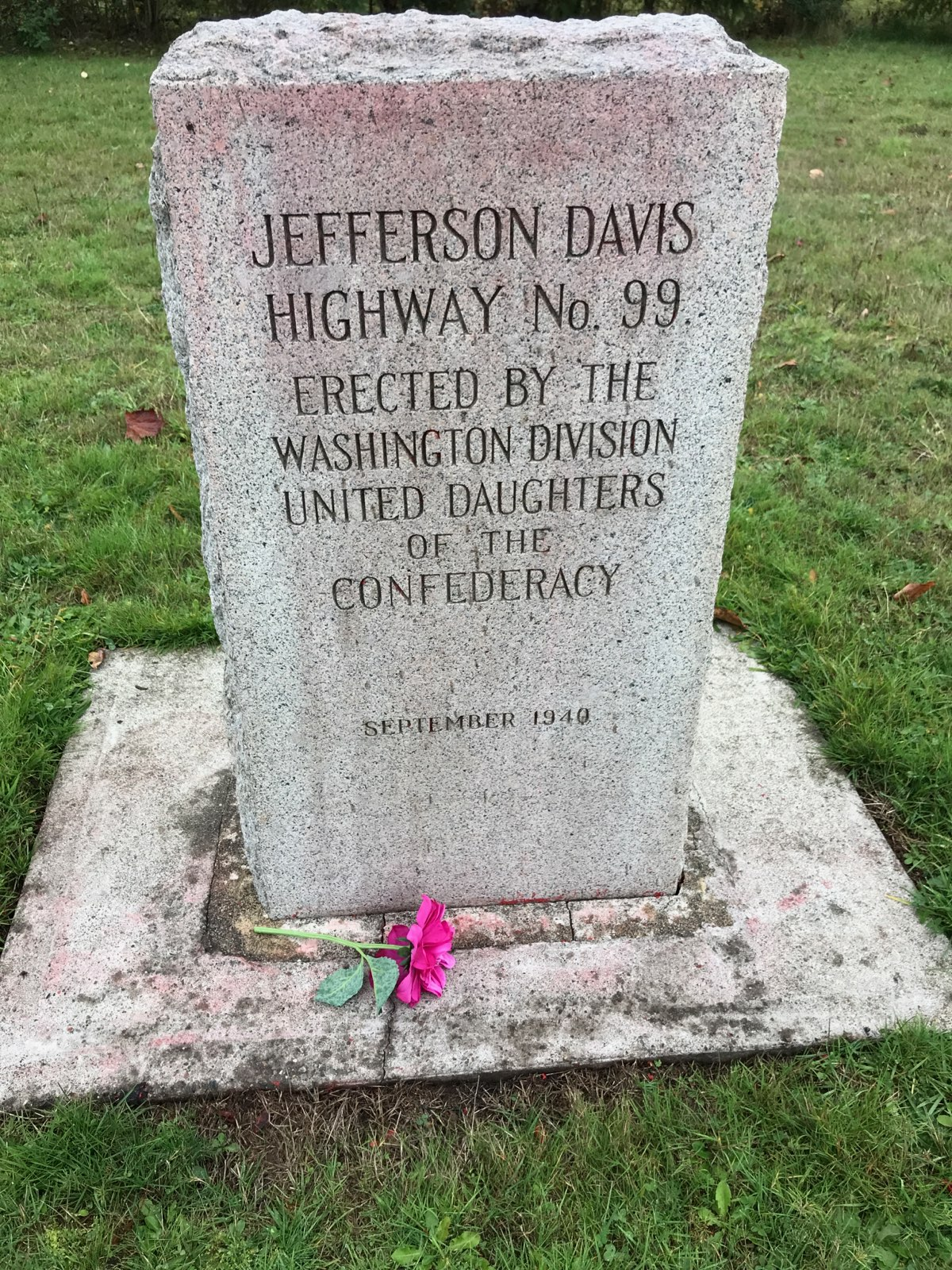
Jefferson Davis Highway marker from Blaine

- Blaine:
  - A stone marker at the northernmost end of the state designating Highway 99 the "Jeff Davis Highway" was erected in the 1930s by the Daughters of the Confederacy, with State approval. It was removed in 2002 through the efforts of State Representative Hans Dunshee and city officials, and after it was discovered that the highway was never officially designated to memorialize Davis by the State. The marker stone was moved to Jefferson Davis Park, a private park operated by the Sons of Confederate Veterans just outside Ridgefield right beside I-5.
- Everett:
  - In 2002, the Washington House of Representatives unanimously approved a bill proposed by Hans Dunshee to rename part of Washington State Route 99, which had been the Jefferson Davis Highway. The bill, however, was killed by a committee of the state's Senate. In March 2016, the Washington State Legislature unanimously passed a joint memorial that asked the state's transportation commission to designate the road as the "William P. Stewart Memorial Highway" to honor an African-American volunteer during the Civil War who later settled in the nearby city of Snohomish. In May 2016, the transportation commission agreed to rename the road.
- Vancouver:
  - In 1998, officials of the city of Vancouver, Washington, removed a marker of the Jefferson Davis Highway (formerly U.S. Route 99) and placed it in a cemetery shed. This action later became controversial when the issues surrounding the Blaine marker were being discussed in the state legislature in 2002. The marker was subsequently moved twice more, to eventually be placed alongside Interstate 5 on private land purchased for the purpose of giving this marker a permanent home in 2007.
- Seattle:
  - The Robert E. Lee Tree was one of many trees in Seattle's Ravenna Park dedicated to persons of note. The tree and plaque were removed in 1926.
  - The United Confederate Veterans Memorial was a Confederate monument in Seattle's privately owned Lake View Cemetery. The monument was toppled by unknown persons, apparently on July 3, 2020, after weeks of protests in the city following the murder of George Floyd in Minnesota.
- East Wenatchee
  - Robert E. Lee Elementary School (1955). The school district rejected a name change in 2015, and again in 2017. In 2018 it voted to change the name to Lee Elementary School.

=== West Virginia ===
- Charles Town: It was in Charles Town, in the Jefferson County Courthouse, that abolitionist John Brown was tried; he was hanged nearby. In 1986, the UDC, who oppose memorials to John Brown, erected at the entrance to the Jefferson County Courthouse a bronze plaque "in honor and memory of the Confederate soldiers of Jefferson County, who served in the War Between the States". The local newspaper, Spirit of Jefferson, and a group of local African Americans called for its removal. On September 7, 2017, the Jefferson County Commission voted 5–0 to let the plaque be. The group Women's March West Virginia attended each County Commission meeting holding signs that say "Remove the plaque". After the 2018 elections, the composition of the County Commission changed; the plaque was the main issue in the election. On December 6, 2018, the Commission voted 3–2 to remove the plaque, and it was removed December 7, and returned to the UDC.

=== Wisconsin ===
- Madison
  - Confederate Rest section of Forest Hill Cemetery. This section of the cemetery contains the remains of more than 100 Confederate soldiers who died as prisoners of war at nearby Camp Randall.
    - In 2015, a flag pole was removed from the section. The pole had been used to fly the Confederate flag for one week around Memorial Day.
    - In August 2017, Madison mayor Paul Soglin ordered the removal of a plaque and a larger stone monument, erected in 1906 with UDC funding. The plaque, which referred to the interred Confederates as "valiant Confederate soldiers" and "unsung heroes", was removed on August 17, 2017. Removal of the stone monument, which contains the names of the soldiers buried there, did not take place immediately because of legal challenges and logistical concerns. On October 2, 2018, the Madison City Council voted 16–2 for its removal, overruling a Landmark Commission's recommendation that it stay.
    - In January 2019, a stone cenotaph etched with the names of Confederate 140 prisoners of war was removed from the cemetery by the Madison Parks Department and transferred to storage at the Wisconsin Veterans Museum.

=== Brazil ===
- From 1975 to 1998, a version of the Confederate battle flag appeared on the shield and the flag of Americana, Brazil, a city which was settled by Confederate expatriates.

=== Canada ===
- Montreal:
  - In 1957, the United Daughters of the Confederacy had a plaque installed on the outer wall of a Hudson's Bay Company store, commemorating Jefferson Davis's brief stay in the city; the plaque was removed following the Charlottesville Unite the Right rally of August 2017, in response to public complaints.
- Eastern Passage, Nova Scotia:
  - When it was built in 1958, the Tallahassee Community School was named after the Confederate cruiser CSS Tallahassee, which a local pilot had guided around nearby Lawlor Island in August 1864 to avoid Union warships rumored to be monitoring the main entrance to Halifax Harbour. Although nominally a reference to the pilot's navigational feat, the name grew controversial due to the Confederacy's support of slavery, and the school was renamed Horizon Elementary School in March 2021.
- Kincardine, Ontario:
  - A monument outside the Kincardine public library, dedicated in 1910 to former Confederate Army physician Solomon Secord and referencing his Civil War service, was removed in 2023 to facilitate road construction. Due to ongoing controversy, the municipal council decided in September 2024 that the monument would not be reinstalled and would instead be decommissioned and "destroyed... respectfully" after no alternate location agreed to host it.

== See also ==
- Confederate Memorial Day, also contested
- Decolonization of public space
- List of monument and memorial controversies in the United States
- List of monuments and memorials removed during the George Floyd protests
- List of name changes due to the George Floyd protests
- Modern display of the Confederate battle flag
- United States racial unrest (2020–2023)
