= Eunice Sahle =

Kenyan economist and political scientist

- Occupations: Economist; political scientist
- Awards: Fellow of the African Academy of Sciences (2016)

Academic background
- Education: University of Toronto; Queen's University at Kingston
- Thesis: Democratisation in Malawi : state, economic structure and neo-liberal hegemony (2001)
- Doctoral advisor: Colin Leys

Academic work
- Discipline: African studies
- Institutions: University of North Carolina at Chapel Hill

Eunice Njeri Sahle is a Kenyan economist and political scientist. Specializing in the economic and political development of Africa, she has published several edited volumes, including The Legacies of Julius Nyerere (2002), and she is a 2016 Fellow of the African Academy of Sciences. She is a professor at University of North Carolina at Chapel Hill and chaired their Department of African and Afro-American Studies (2012-2016, 2017-2021).

== Biography ==
Sahle was born to James K. Mugo, a civil servant based in Nairobi, and his wife Esther. her Anglican family was well-off and "had the means to send their six children to boarding schools". She was inspired by her mother's story about the first Black Kenyan student educated at Limuru Girls' School; Sahle later met that student while in college. She attended the University of Toronto, where she got a BA in Political Science and International Development and MA in Political Science, and Queen's University at Kingston, where she got a PhD in Political Studies. Her doctoral dissertation Democratisation in Malawi: State, Economic Structure and Neo-Liberal Hegemony was supervised by Colin Leys.

Sahle became part of University of North Carolina at Chapel Hill, becoming associate professor in their Department of African, African American and Diaspora Studies. On January 1, 2012, she became chair of that department after Julius Nyang'oro resigned amidst the University of North Carolina academic-athletic scandal. She later served until 2016, as well as another term from 2017 to 2021. She is also the chair of UNC Chapel Hill's African Studies Center.

Sahle specializes in the economic and political development of Africa. In 2002, she and David McDonald co-edited The Legacies of Julius Nyerere, a volume of conference papers on the eponymous Tanzanian statesman. In 2004, she and Ngũgĩ wa Thiong'o co-authored a Diogenes article about Hegelianism in Chinua Achebe's work. In 2010, she published World Orders, Development and Transformation, a book on the post-World War II international order. She later edited three volumes on African studies: Globalization and Socio-Cultural Processes in Contemporary Africa (2015); Democracy, Constitutionalism, and Politics in Africa (2017); and Human Rights in Africa: Contemporary Debates and Struggles (2019).

Sahle was elected Fellow of the African Academy of Sciences in 2016. She is Anglican, and makes daily visits to Chapel of the Cross, which she said helped "Chapel Hill [start] feeling like home".

== Bibliography ==
- (ed. with David A. McDonald) The Legacies of Julius Nyerere (2002)
- World Orders, Development and Transformation (2010)
- (ed.) Globalization and Socio-Cultural Processes in Contemporary Africa (2015)
- (ed.) Democracy, Constitutionalism, and Politics in Africa (2017)
- (ed.) Human Rights in Africa: Contemporary Debates and Struggles (2019)
