= Mark D. West =

American legal scholar

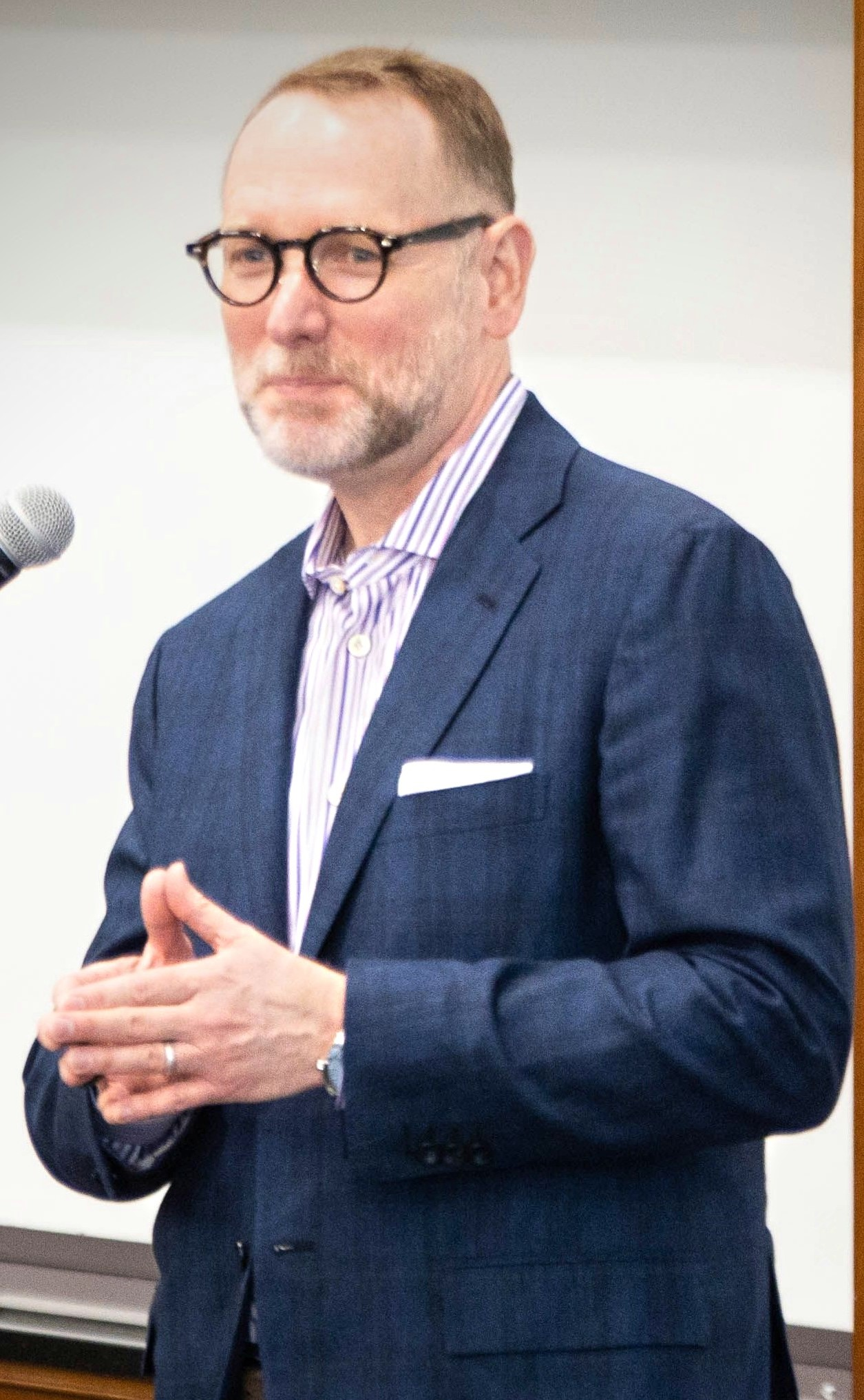

Provost of Washington University in St. Louis
- Incumbent
- Assumed office August 1, 2025
- Preceded by: Beverly Wendland

17th Dean of University of Michigan Law School
- In office 2013–2023
- Preceded by: Kyle D. Logue (interim)
- Succeeded by: Evan H. Caminker

Personal details
- Born: July 26, 1968 (age 57) Conway, Arkansas, U.S.
- Education: Rhodes College (BA); Columbia University (JD)

Mark D. West (born July 26, 1968) is an American legal scholar, social scientist, and academic serving as the Nippon Life Professor of Law at the University of Michigan since 2003 and the David A. Breach Dean of Law from 2013 to 2023. He was the 17th dean of the University of Michigan Law School and is now the provost at Washington University in St. Louis.

== Education and early career ==
West earned a B.A. from Rhodes College in International Studies and a J.D. from Columbia University, where he studied with Walter Gellhorn. He clerked for Eugene Nickerson of the United States District Court for the Eastern District of New York and practiced transactional law in New York City and Tokyo with the multinational law firm Paul, Weiss, Rifkind, Wharton & Garrison LLP. Between practice and academia, he was awarded an Abe Fellowship by the Social Science Research Council at the University of Tokyo Faculty of Law, where he studied with Hideki Kanda. West was named assistant professor at the University of Michigan Law School in 1998, and was appointed Nippon Life Professor of Law in 2003. He has presented, conducted research, and taught at several Japanese institutions, most frequently at Kyoto University (2000, 2001–2002, 2003, 2005), where he was a Japan Society for the Promotion of Science Visiting Scholar and a Fulbright Research Scholar.

== Early administrative service ==
In 1998, West founded the University of Michigan Law School's Japanese Legal Studies Program. From 2003 to 2008, West served simultaneously as Director of the University of Michigan Law School's Center for International and Corporate Law and the University of Michigan's multidisciplinary Center for Japanese Studies (CJS), the oldest such center in the country. His five-year term as CJS's 16th director is the longest consecutive term of service since the center's founding in 1947. From 2008 to 2013, he served as Michigan Law's Associate Dean for Academic Affairs.

== Deanship ==
West was appointed Dean of the Law School effective September 1, 2013. Among his achievements as dean, he significantly expanded and diversified the faculty, including the hiring of a record 21 new faculty members in 2022. Working with students, employers, and alumni, he established a summer funding guarantee for all first-year students that was the most expansive in the country at the time of its creation. He created and launched several new initiatives, including the Law and Mobility Program; the Master of Advanced Corporation Law degree; the Veterans’ Clinic; the Workers’ Rights Clinic; and the Problem Solving Initiative, an interdisciplinary, university-wide platform for developing solutions to difficult challenges facing business and society. West led the school's successful fundraising efforts in the Victors for Michigan campaign, with donors giving over $200 million to the school. He led a significant expansion of the school's diversity, equity, and inclusion efforts, including the creation of an alumni-majority advisory board on Race and Racism, the establishment of a named deanship devoted to racial justice issues, the launching of the school's first diversity, equity, and inclusion strategic plan, and the addition of faculty whose research examines race-related legal issues and teach race-related courses.

In 2022, joining several other law schools, West announced the decision that "it no longer makes sense for Michigan Law to participate in the U.S. News & World Report law school rankings process."

== Research ==
West's research is broadly multidisciplinary and focuses on Japanese law and the Japanese legal system.

West's early work focused on corporate governance and law and economics. Prior to joining the University of Michigan, his research examined the role of law and norms in such areas as the shareholder derivative suit, the Japan Sumo Association, and Sokaiya corporate racketeers. This work helped form a basis for his first book, Economic Organizations and Corporate Governance in Japan: The Impact of Formal and Informal Rules (with Curtis J. Milhaupt), which Anderson say "marks a new era in the field of comparative Japanese law and cements the two authors as the doyens of this ‘Next Generation’."

West then turned his scholarly attention to the role of law in the everyday lives of Japanese citizens. His book Law in Everyday Japan: Sex, Sumo, Suicide, and Statutes was widely and positively reviewed across multiple disciplines. The Harvard Law Review calls it "colorful and methodologically unique," while legal scholar Haley calls it "insightful." Among anthropologists, Ryang calls it "invigorating;" Magnarella labels it "extreme well researched" and "highly recommended," and Brumann says "this is without a doubt a creative, informative, and conscientiously argued book from which anthropologists and other students of Japan will have much to learn." Among historians, Kingston called it "superb" and "delightfully engaging," and Allison described it as "skillful, astute, and fascinating." Relying on what political scientist Le Blanc calls "eclectic" methods, West "’loses’ cell phones, interviews love-hotel employees, talks with survivors of failed suicide attempts, examines records in police and local government archives, and, when data permits, even conducts simple quantitative analyses," creating a "marvelously sane reminder of the value of being painstaking and rigorous and the silliness of hewing too closely to any methodological or theoretical dogma." One chapter of the book, based largely on a Law and Society Review article in which West analyzes the laws and norms regarding returning lost property in Japan, continues to receive significant attention many years later in the popular press, including Bloomberg, the BBC, the Los Angeles Times, the Wall Street Journal, and Slate.

Following the success of Law in Everyday Japan, West turned his attention to the comparative study of scandal, which was also broadly read across disciplines. Among legal scholars, Upham calls Secrets, Sex, and Spectacle: The Rules of Scandal in Japan and the United States "deliciously entertaining" and says that West is "encyclopedic in his knowledge of popular culture in both countries," while Lee calls the book a "must-read for comparativists and all students and scholars of contemporary East Asian law and society," and Liebman says "we should delight in the details of scandal and seediness. It would be hard for readers of this book to do anything else." Sociologist Adut writes that the book "stands out by its lively style, lucidity, and erudition."

West's later work focuses on the ways in which judicial opinions discuss and shape social phenomena. Based on what Foreign Affairs calls an "unconventional prism"—a close reading of thousands of Japanese judicial opinions—West's research is concerned with both the explicit and implicit messages that the law, often through judges, sends about topics such as love, sex, and marriage (Lovesick Japan: Love, Sex, Marriage Law) and alcohol and drunkenness (Drunk Japan: Law and Alcohol in Japanese Society). Among legal scholars, Ramseyer says of the former that "West reads his court opinions with care and intelligence (with, frankly, extraordinary care and intelligence)," and Nottage calls the book a "rich and ambitious work." Anthropologist Alexy calls it "a fascinating book that offers a necessary perspective"; sociologist Shinohara calls it "a fascinating and innovative study";;; Maclean’s says it is "an arresting glimpse into Japan’s secret heart"; and in its review, The Economist notes that "teasing out the mysteries of Japanese society by way of its statutes is the specialty of Mark West."

== Select awards and honors ==
- 1989 – Phi Beta Kappa
- 1992–1993 – Notes and Comments Editor, Columbia Law Review
- 1997–1998 – Social Science Research Council Abe Fellowship (University of Tokyo)
- 2001– 2002 – Japan Foundation Grant
- 2001–2002 – Japan Society for the Promotion of Science Research Grant (Kyoto University)
- 2001–2002 – Fulbright Research Scholar (Kyoto University)
- 2004 – Hessel Yntema Prize, American Society of Comparative Law (for "most outstanding" article by an under-40 scholar )
- 2013–present – Member, American Law Institute

== Bibliography ==
Selected books:

• Economic Organizations and Corporate Governance in Japan: The Impact of Formal and Informal Rules, Curtis J. Milhaupt, co-author. Oxford: Oxford University Press (2004) ISBN 9780199272112.

• Law in Everyday Japan: Sex, Sumo, Suicide, and Statutes. Chicago: University of Chicago Press (2005) ISBN 9780226894034.

• Secrets, Sex and Spectacle: The Rules of Scandal in Japan and the United States. Chicago: University of Chicago Press (2006) ISBN 9780226894089.

• The Japanese Legal System: Cases, Codes, and Commentary. Curtis J. Milhaupt & J. Mark Ramseyer, co-authors. New York: Foundation Press (2006; 2d edition 2012). ISBN 9781609300296.

• Lovesick Japan: Sex, Marriage, Romance, Law. Ithaca: Cornell University Press (2011) ISBN 9780801449475.

• Drunk Japan: Law and Alcohol in Japanese Society, Oxford: Oxford University Press (2020) ISBN 9780190070847.

Selected articles:

• West, Mark D. (2000). Private Ordering at the World's First Futures Exchange, 98 Michigan Law Review 2574 (2000)

• Milhaupt, Curtis, and West, Mark D. (2000). The Dark Side of Private Ordering: An Institutional and Empirical Analysis of Organized Crime, 67 University of Chicago Law Review 41.

• Pistor, Katharina; Keinan, Yoram; Kleinheisterkamp, Jan; and West, Mark D. (2003). Innovation in Corporate Law, 31 Journal of Comparative Economics 676.

• West, Mark D. (2003). Losers: Recovering Lost Property in Japan and the United States, 37:2 Law & Society Review 369.

Academic offices
Preceded by Evan H. Caminker	Dean of the University of Michigan Law School; 2013–2023	Incumbent
