= Dan Kane =

American news reporter (born 1961)

- Born: Daniel Paul Kane; 1961 (age 64–65)
- Education: St. John Fisher
- Occupation: Investigative journalist
- Writing career
- Language: English
- Subjects: Education, government
- Notable awards: First Amendment Award; APSE award 2013; EWA Citation 2013; National Headliner Award 2013; Duke/Green-Rossiter; Frank McCulloch Award for Courage in Journalism

Daniel Paul Kane (born 1961) is an American news reporter and investigative journalist for the Raleigh, North Carolina newspaper The News & Observer, notable for uncovering and exposing the academics scandal at the University of North Carolina at Chapel Hill. Kane is credited for unearthing substantive academic fraud in conjunction with whistleblower Mary Willingham regarding student-athletes who were directed towards phony classes, according to allegations. According to The New York Times, Kane was subjected to "violent threats, angry screeds, and Twitter flame campaigns" in response to his reporting. He "first uncovered a pattern of lax oversight and risibly easy or nonexistent classes disproportionately benefiting athletes".

Kane joined the News & Observer in 1997. He covered local and state government and North Carolina State University, legislative corruption, and the formation of the state lottery. His reporting on North Carolina's secretive personnel law exposed how the state kept much information about state employees from public scrutiny, and it led to a new state law to expedite information-gathering about the pay and performance of state employees. He won a First Amendment Award from the Associated Press Managing Editors for work which advances the freedom of information. He won an award for investigative journalism in 2013 from the Associated Press Sports Editors society. Along with his colleagues J. Andrew Curliss and Andrew Carter, he won a special citation for reporting on the 2010 University of North Carolina at Chapel Hill football scandal. The team also won a National Headliner Award for education writing from the Press Club of Atlantic City. With Jane Stancill and J. Andrew Curliss, he won the Duke University/Green-Rossiter award for "distinguished newspaper work in higher education." He is a 1983 graduate of Saint John Fisher College in Rochester, New York.
