= William Leake Andrews =

American academic (born 1946)

- Born: September 27, 1946 (age 79)
- Education: Davidson College; University of North Carolina at Chapel Hill
- Occupation: Academic
- Spouse: Charron Andrews (née Fenbert) (m. 1984)
- Children: 2

William Leake Andrews (born September 27, 1946) is an American Professor Emeritus of English at The University of North Carolina at Chapel Hill and a scholar of early African-American literature. With books such as To Tell a Free Story: The First Century of Afro-American Autobiography, 1760–1865 (1986), Andrews helped establish the academic study of African-American literature in the late twentieth century. In 2017, Andrews received the Jay B. Hubbell Medal for Lifetime Achievement in American Literature from the Modern Language Association.

== Biography ==
=== Early life and education ===
William Leake Andrews attended Davidson College in North Carolina, where he joined ROTC and graduated with a Bachelor of Arts degree in 1968. The United States Army commissioned Andrews as a Second Lieutenant in 1968, and he later achieved the rank of Captain. He enrolled in the graduate program in English at the University of North Carolina at Chapel Hill. While pursuing his MA (1970) and PhD (1973), Andrews decided to change his research topic to focus on African-American writers such as Charles W. Chesnutt.

== Academic career ==
At Texas Tech University, William L. Andrews was an assistant professor of English from 1973 to 1977. In 1976, his article "William Dean Howells and Charles W. Chesnutt: Criticism and Race Fiction in the Age of Booker T. Washington" won the Norman Foerster Prize for best article of the year in American Literature.

In 1977, Andrews moved to the University of Wisconsin-Madison, where he was an assistant professor until 1979 and then an associate professor until 1988. During this time, he published books and editions that promoted the field of African-American literature, including The Literary Career of Charles W. Chesnutt (Louisiana State University Press, 1980) and To Tell a Free Story (University of Illinois Press, 1986). The latter argued that African-American writers developed strategies, using a range of public writings, to reach skeptical readers and publishers. His critical editions with introductions reintroduced famous narratives by Black American women writers to the public in Sisters of the Spirit: Three Black Women’s Autobiographies of the Nineteenth Century (Indiana University Press, 1986). Andrews also became known as a specialist in the work and life of Frederick Douglass. Andrews was a founding editor of a/b: Auto/Biography Studies and has served as the general editor of the series “Wisconsin Studies in Autobiography” from the University of Wisconsin Press since 1988.

The University of Kansas offered Andrews the position of Joyce and Elizabeth Hall Professor of American Literature with tenure in 1989. He was also the Director of the Hall Center from 1993 until 1996. Andrews continued to edit and publish new editions of African-American autobiographies and narratives that had been widely read in the nineteenth century, such as the works of William Wells Brown. These editions, released in print and later digitized, facilitated the use of African-American authors in college courses, high school classrooms, and libraries.

In 1997, Andrews accepted the E. Maynard Adams Professorship of English & Comparative Literature at The University of North Carolina at Chapel Hill, which he held until his retirement in 2019. With Henry Louis Gates, Jr., and Nellie Y. McKay, Andrews edited the Norton Anthology of African American Literature (first edition, 1997). His work with Frances Foster and Trudier Harris on The Oxford Companion to African American Literature received accolades for its impact as a reference source. Andrews led the project "North American Slave Narratives, which became part of "Documenting the American South", an award-winning digital humanities resource of texts, images, and recordings from the collections of the University Libraries at UNC. In 2007, his undergraduate alma mater Davidson College awarded him an honorary doctor of letters degree. From 2005 to 2012, Andrews was the Senior Associate Dean for the Fine Arts and Humanities of UNC. UNC gave him the William F. Little Award for Distinguished Service to the College of Arts and Sciences in 2012. The “Carolina Digital Humanities Initiative,” a project Andrews helped develop as a co-principal investigator, received a grant from the Andrew W. Mellon Foundation in 2012 to further digital teaching, research, and collaboration.

Andrews supervised dissertations and mentored colleagues during his career. While at UNC-CH, Andrews helped secure grants to fund graduate fellowships from the Andrew W. Mellon Foundation. Among his students are academics Andreá N. Williams, Associate Professor of English at The Ohio State University, and Joycelyn Moody, who holds the Sue E. Denman Distinguished Chair in American Literature at the University of Texas at San Antonio. Moody wrote about Andrews’s years of service to the profession “initiating the least experienced students into the world of the academy." Additionally, Andrews has assisted families in preserving and publishing texts. With Regina Mason, a descendant of the writer William Grimes, Andrews co-edited Life of William Grimes, the Runaway Slave (Oxford, 2008), first published in 1825. Mason characterized the original work as one that “paved the way for the American slave narrative” later in the nineteenth century.

Andrews served on the Davidson College Commission on Race and Slavery between 2018 and 2020. Andrews also worked with the North Carolina Humanities Council and the National Endowment for the Humanities.

In 2019, he published a monograph, Slavery and Class in the American South: A Generation of Slave Narrative Testimony, 1840-1865 with Oxford University Press. Henry Louis Gates, Jr., described Slavery and Class as a "seminal work of scholarship, one destined to generate a new branch of literary studies, dedicated to studying how class mattered within the African American tradition."

=== UNC academic-athletic scandal ===
While he was Senior Associate Dean for Fine Arts and Humanities at UNC-CH, Andrews was selected to co-commission a 2012 report that identified systemic flaws in standards for courses during the University of North Carolina academic-athletic scandal. The resulting report investigated the content and delivery of courses offered by the Department of African and Afro-American Studies between 2007 and 2011 summer sessions.

== Books ==
- The Literary Career of Charles W. Chesnutt (1980)
- Literary Romanticism in America (editor, 1981)
- Critical Essays on W. E. B. Du Bois (editor, 1985)
- Sisters of the Spirit: Three Black Women’s Autobiographies of the Nineteenth Century (editor, 1986)
- To Tell a Free Story: The First Century of Afro-American Autobiography, 1760–1865 (1986)
- My Bondage and My Freedom, by Frederick Douglass (editor, 1987)
- Six Women’s Slave Narratives (editor, 1988)
- The Autobiography of an Ex-Colored Man, by James Weldon Johnson (editor, 1990)
- Three Classic African-American Novels (editor, 1990)
- Journeys in New Worlds: Early American Women’s Narratives (co-editor, 1990)
- Bursting Bonds, by William Pickens (editor, 1991)
- African-American Literature (co-editor, 1991)
- Critical Essays on Frederick Douglass (editor, 1991)
- Collected Stories of Charles W. Chesnutt (editor, 1992)
- The African-American Novel in the Age of Reaction: Three Classics (editor, 1992)
- Classic American Autobiographies (editor, 1992)
- African American Autobiography: A Collection of Critical Essays (editor, 1993)
- From Fugitive Slave to Free Man: The Autobiographies of William Wells Brown (editor, 1993)
- Classic Fiction of the Harlem Renaissance (editor, 1994)
- Up from Slavery, by Booker T. Washington (editor, 1995)
- The Oxford Frederick Douglass Reader (editor, 1996)
- The Norton Anthology of African American Literature (co-editor, 1997)
- Narrative of the Life of Frederick Douglass (co-editor, 1997)
- The Oxford Companion to African American Literature (co-editor, 1997)
- The Literature of the American South: A Norton Anthology (editor, 1997)
- Pioneers of the Black Atlantic: Five Slave Narratives, 1772–1815 (co-editor, 1998)
- The Civitas Anthology of American Slave Narratives (co-editor, 1999)
- Toni Morrison's Beloved: A Casebook (co-editor, 1999)
- Slave Narrative (co-editor, 2000)
- Conjure Tales and Stories of the Color Line, by Charles W. Chesnutt (editor, 2000)
- The Concise Companion to African American Literature (co-editor, 2001)
- Classic African American Women's Narratives (editor, 2002)
- Richard Wright's Black Boy (American Hunger): A Casebook (co-editor, 2003)
- North Carolina Slave Narratives (co-editor, 2003)
- James Weldon Johnson: Writings (editor, 2004)
- Behind the Scenes by Elizabeth Keckley (editor, 2005)
- The North Carolina Roots of African American Literature (editor, 2006)
- The Curse of Caste; or The Slave Bride by Julia C. Collins (co-editor, 2006)
- Life of William Grimes, the Runaway Slave (co-editor, 2008)
- The Portable Charles Chesnutt (editor, 2008)
- Slave Narratives after Slavery (editor, 2011)
- The Life of John Thompson, a Fugitive Slave (editor, 2011)
- Slavery and Class in the American South: A Generation of Slave Narrative Testimony, 1840–1865 (2020)

== Awards and honors ==
- Norman Foerster Prize from American Literature, 1976
- National Endowment for the Humanities Research Fellowship, 1980–81
- American Council of Learned Societies Research Fellowship, 1984–85
- Choice Outstanding Academic Book for To Tell a Free Story, 1986
- William Riley Parker Prize for outstanding article of the year in PMLA, 1990
- Fellow, Center for Advanced Study in the Behavioral Sciences, Stanford University, 1994-95
- American Library Association Outstanding Reference Source for The Oxford Companion to African American Literature, 1997
- Booklist Editor’s Choice for The Oxford Companion to African American Literature, 1997
- Outstanding Library Program for Documenting the American South from Southeastern Library Network, 2000
- Choice Outstanding Academic Book for The Curse of Caste, 2007
- Honorary Doctor of Letters conferred by Davidson College, 2007
- Bill Little Award for Distinguished Service to the College of Arts and Sciences, UNC, 2012
- James W.C. Pennington Award, University of Heidelberg, 2015
- Thomas Jefferson Award, University of North Carolina-Chapel Hill, 2015
- Jay B. Hubbell Medal for Lifetime Achievement in American Literature, Modern Language Association, 2017

== Personal life ==
Andrews has advocated for the human rights of incarcerated people and those who have been in jail with the Religious Coalition for a Non-Violent Durham. A pianist and singer, he has set the poetry of Emily Dickinson to music and performed some of his compositions at the 2013 Emily Dickinson International Society International Conference.

Andrews married Charron Andrews (née Fenbert) in the summer of 1984. Together, they have two children and one grandchild. By tracing his genealogy, Andrews learned that his Virginian ancestor John Ferneyhough, Jr., joined a local organization in 1835 that opposed abolitionists. In the preface to Slavery and Class, Andrews reflects on being a scholar of African-American narrative whose forebears profited from slavery.
