= University of North Carolina at Chapel Hill football scandal =

College sports scandal in the United States

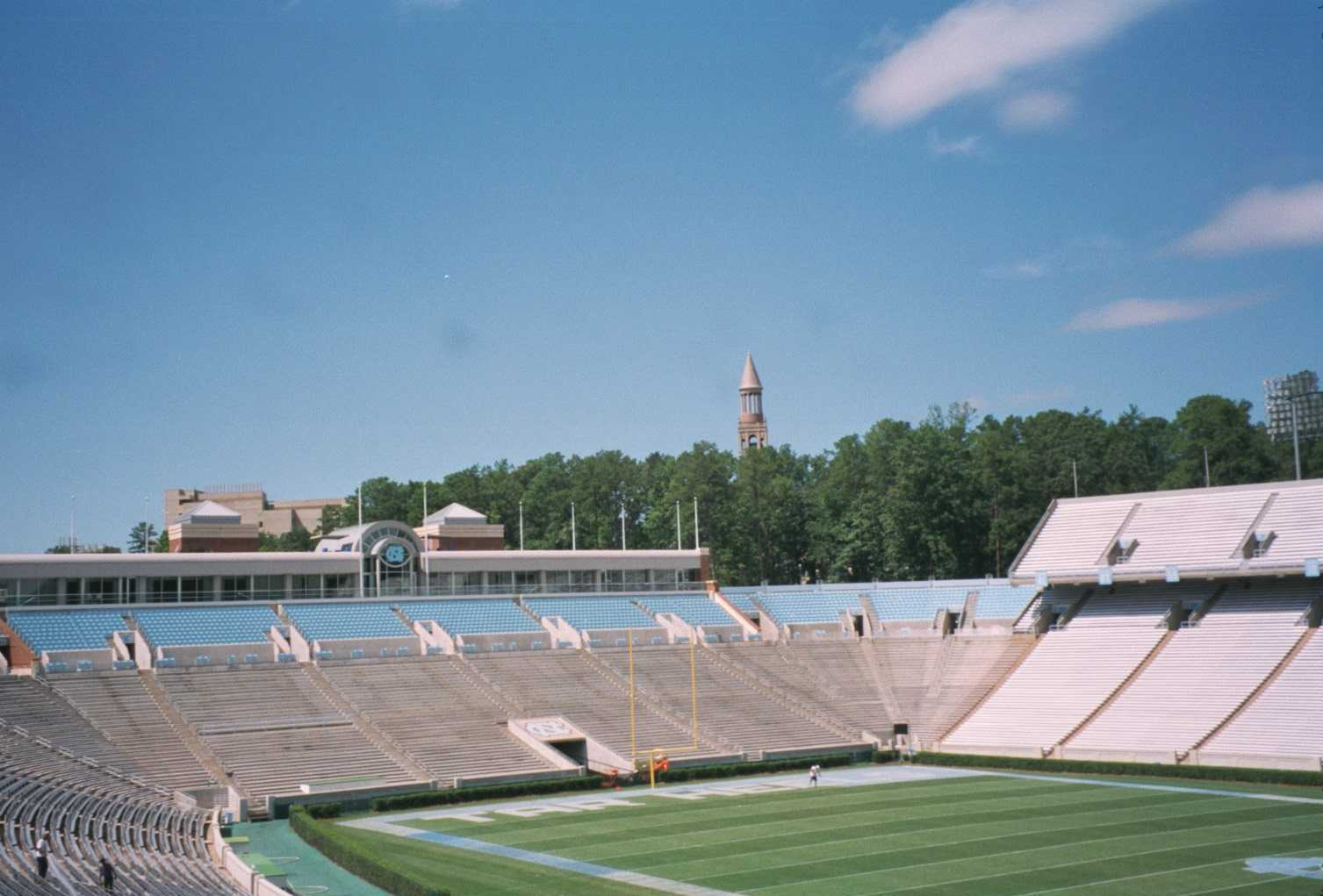
Kenan Memorial Stadium is the home of North Carolina Tar Heels football.

The University of North Carolina at Chapel Hill football scandal is an incident in which the football program at the University of North Carolina at Chapel Hill was investigated and punished for multiple violations of National Collegiate Athletic Association (NCAA) rules and regulations, including academic fraud and improper benefits to student-athletes from sports agents. The NCAA investigation found that a tutor had completed coursework for several football players, among other improper services. Additionally, the investigation found that seven football players received thousands of dollars in valuables from sports agents or people associated with agents. The NCAA sanctions led to a postseason ban, a reduction of 15 scholarships, and three years of probation. It was the second major infraction case in North Carolina's history and the first since the men's basketball program was sanctioned in 1960 for recruiting violations.

Additionally, North Carolina football disassociated itself with several players involved in NCAA violations and fired football head coach Butch Davis in the summer before the 2011 season. In 2013, the district attorney of Orange County, North Carolina, the county where the university is located, initiated prosecution against five people involved in the scandal for violations of the state law about sports agents. Among the charged included the tutor found by the NCAA to have provided inappropriate academic assistance to players. The charges were later dropped.

== History ==
=== Investigations and suspensions ===
On July 15, 2010, ESPN reported that the NCAA interviewed several North Carolina football players over alleged gifts, extra benefits, and sports agent involvement. Defensive tackle Marvin Austin, among players interviewed by the NCAA, made a post on Twitter on May 29. The post contained a reference to Club LIV, a nightclub in Miami, Florida in which a sports agent's party had taken place two months earlier. Austin was reported to have attended that party with North Carolina wide receiver Greg Little and South Carolina tight end Weslye Saunders, among other college football players.

On August 26, 2010, the NCAA began a separate investigation of North Carolina football that involved possible academic fraud involving a tutor in the university's academic support program. The tutor was later identified as Jennifer Wiley. According to athletic director Dick Baddour, the NCAA began the second investigation based on information shared by a player interviewed in the first investigation into sports agents. Another source familiar with the investigation said that Wiley was accused of "inappropriate help on papers that football players were required to write for classes." However, Baddour said on September 24 that Wiley declined to cooperate with the NCAA.

North Carolina suspended Austin on September 1, before the season began. In total, thirteen players missed North Carolina's September 4 season opener against LSU due to the NCAA investigation. The following day, defensive line coach and associate head coach John Blake was forced to resign; Blake had been under investigation for improper contact with sports agents, including Gary Wichard. On September 13, running back Shaun Draughn was the first of the 13 to be reinstated. On September 22, the NCAA suspended defensive backs Kendric Burney and Deunta Williams for six and four games, respectively, and credited the two for the two games both had already sat out. On October 11, 2010, North Carolina formally dismissed Austin from the team, and the NCAA declared wide receiver Little and defensive end Robert Quinn "permanently ineligible" due to receiving improper benefits.

=== McAdoo lawsuit against NCAA ===
Defensive end Michael McAdoo filed a lawsuit against the NCAA on July 1, 2011, seeking reinstatement to the North Carolina football team. This followed the NCAA finding McAdoo guilty of accepting improper benefits and committing academic fraud via coursework completed by Jennifer Wiley. The NCAA reached its verdict based on the UNC Undergraduate Honor Court finding that McAdoo committed academic dishonesty by having Wiley complete a bibliography and works-cited section on a research paper. From this lawsuit, McAdoo was forced to make public the paper; an analysis by Dan Kane of the Raleigh News & Observer found that the Honor Court failed to find multiple instances of plagiarism in McAdoo's paper. On July 13, a North Carolina Superior Court judge in Durham refused to grant an injunction against the NCAA, thus upholding ineligibility for McAdoo.

=== NCAA findings ===
In June 2011, the NCAA brought up formal allegations against North Carolina football. On March 12, 2012, the NCAA released its public infractions report for North Carolina. The NCAA found North Carolina guilty of multiple infractions, including academic fraud and failure to monitor the football program. However, the NCAA did not find anything extending to lack of institutional control, explaining that the university "educated its tutors regarding academic improprieties and its coaches regarding outside athletically related income...self-discovered the academic fraud and took decisive action...cooperated fully, is not a repeat violator and...exhibited appropriate control over its athletics program."

=== Department of African and Afro-American Studies controversy ===
As the NCAA investigated issues relating to sports agents and academic dishonesty, the university's Department of African and Afro-American Studies (AFAM) came under scrutiny due to the numerous football and basketball student-athletes enrolled in such classes. On September 1, 2011, department chair Julius Nyang'oro resigned from his executive position but remained on faculty.

In 2012, an internal investigation by the university and another inquiry led by former North Carolina governor James G. Martin found evidence of unethical practices by AFAM, such as limited class meetings and unauthorized grade changes. The university's internal investigation found that the questionable classes benefited the general student body, not just student-athletes.

== Sanctions ==
=== Self-imposed ===
Citing harm to its reputation, North Carolina fired Butch Davis on July 27, 2011. The next day, Dick Baddour announced that he would resign and allow chancellor Holden Thorp to hire a football head coach. Also, defensive coordinator Everett Withers was promoted to interim head coach while the university sought a permanent one.

In September 2011, North Carolina vacated all 16 wins from its 2008 and 2009 seasons.

In November 2013, North Carolina sent a disassociation letter to Austin, Little, and Quinn.

=== From the NCAA ===
On March 12, 2012, the NCAA issued formal sanctions against North Carolina football: a postseason ban for 2012, reductions of 15 scholarships, and 3 years of probation. Among the NCAA's findings: John Blake was paid by agent Gary Wichard, to whom Blake referred players. Consequently, Blake got a three-year show-cause penalty with severe restrictions on employment at NCAA member schools.

== Criminal charges ==
On September 30, 2013, a grand jury in Orange County, North Carolina issued sealed indictments on five people for 25 charges of violating the state Uniform Athlete Agents Act. Among the five charged were Jennifer Wiley (now married and known as Jennifer Wiley Thompson), sports agent Terry Watson, and Michael Wayne Johnson Jr., a former quarterback at North Carolina Central University accused of acting as a "go-between" for Terry Watson and Greg Little.

Julius Nyang'oro was indicted by a grand jury in the same county on December 2, 2013.

== See also ==
- University of North Carolina at Chapel Hill academics-athletics scandal
