= Ralph Gebhardt =

American Football Coach

Playing career
- 1972–1975: Rochester
- Position: Defensive back

Coaching career (HC unless noted)
- 1987–1990: St. John Fisher

Head coaching record
- Overall: 18–18–1 (college)

Accomplishments and honors

Awards
- University of Rochester Hall of Fame

Ralph Gebhardt is a retired American football coach and player. He was the head coach at St. John Fisher College from 1987 to 1990.

As a collegiate player at the University of Rochester, Gebhardt was a standout defensive back, earning All-American honors in 1973, 1974, and 1975. He set NCAA records for most touchdowns scored on interceptions in one season (3 in 1974) as well as most interceptions in a career (34 from 1972 to 1975).

== Head coaching record ==
=== College ===
Year	Team	Overall	Conference	Standing	Bowl/playoffs
St. John Fisher Cardinals (Independent) (1987–1990)
1987	St. John Fisher	5–4			
1988	St. John Fisher	4–4			
1989	St. John Fisher	6–4			
1990	St. John Fisher	3–6–1			
St. John Fisher:		18–18–1			
Total:		18–18–1			
