= Christopher Celenza =

American scholar of Renaissance history (born 1967)

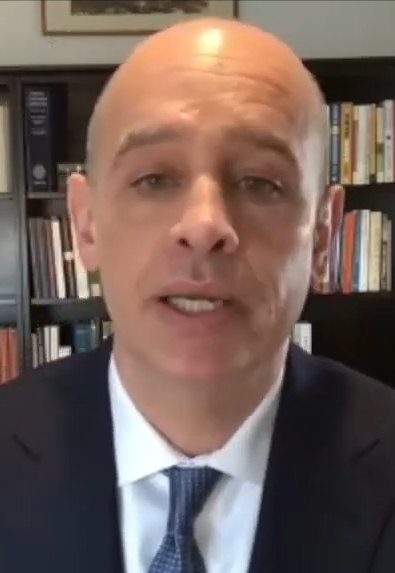

James B. Knapp Dean of the Krieger School of Arts and Sciences
- Incumbent
- Assumed office January 4, 2021
- Preceded by: Beverly Wendland

Dean of Georgetown College
- In office July 1, 2017 – 2020
- Preceded by: Chester Gillis
- Succeeded by: Rosario Ceballo

Director of the American Academy in Rome
- In office July 1, 2010 – June 30, 2014
- Preceded by: Carmela Vircillo Franklin
- Succeeded by: Kimberly Bowes

Personal details
- Born: 1967 (age 58–59) Cleveland, Ohio, U.S.
- Education: University at Albany, SUNY (BA, MA); Duke University (PhD); University of Hamburg (Dr. phil.)

Academic work
- Institutions: Georgetown University; Johns Hopkins University; American Academy in Rome
- Main interests: Renaissance history & European scholarship

Christopher S. Celenza (born 1967) is an American scholar of Renaissance history and the current James B. Knapp Dean of the Krieger School of Arts and Sciences at Johns Hopkins University, where he is also a professor of history and classics.

== Early life and education ==
Celenza was born in 1967 in Cleveland, Ohio. He grew up in Staten Island in New York City, and attended Monsignor Farrell High School, where he graduated in 1985. He received a B.A. and M.A. in history from the State University of New York at Albany in 1988 and 1989, respectively. From 1992 to 1993, Celenza studied in Florence on a Fulbright Scholarship.

In 1996, Celenza received his Ph.D. in history from Duke University in 1996. His dissertation was titled, "A Renaissance Humanist's View of his Social and Cultural Environment: Lapo Da Castiglionchio the Younger's De curiae commodis". While still a doctoral student, Celenza was awarded the Rome Prize, which granted him a fellowship at the American Academy in Rome from 1993 to 1994.

In 2001, he received his second doctorate, a Dr. phil. in the classics specializing in Neo-Latin literature, from the University of Hamburg. His Hamburg dissertation was titled, "Piety and Pythagoras in Late Fifteenth Century Florence: The Symbolum Nesianum." Following his degree, Celenza was awarded the Frederick Burkhardt Residential Fellowship for Recently Tenured Scholars by the American Council of Learned Societies in 2003.

== Academic career ==
While pursuing his doctorate at the University of Hamburg, Celenza became an assistant professor in 1996 and later associate professor of history at Michigan State University. During this period, he was eventually appointed full professor and associate chair of graduate studies for the university. In 2005, Celenza joined the faculty of Johns Hopkins University, holding positions in the departments of history, German and Romance languages and literatures, and classics. While there, he was also the founder of the Charles Singleton Center for the Study of Premodern Europe, of which he served as its first director from 2008 to 2010. In 2008, Celenza was awarded a Guggenheim Fellowship.

In 2010, Celenza took a leave of absence from Johns Hopkins to become the 21st director of the American Academy in Rome, succeeding Carmela Vircillo Franklin. He held this position until 2014, when he was succeeded by Kimberly Bowes. Following his directorship, Celenza returned to Johns Hopkins, where he became the chair of the department of classics from 2014 to 2016 and the Charles Homer Haskins Professor of classics. For a year, he served as vice dean for humanities and social sciences in the Krieger School of Arts and Sciences. Celenza was subsequently appointed the vice provost for faculty affairs of Johns Hopkins. During his time at Johns Hopkins, he also assisted in the founding of the Alexander Grass Humanities Institute.

On March 2, 2017, the president of Georgetown University, John DeGioia, announced that Celenza would become the Dean of Georgetown College, succeeding Chester Gillis. He officially assumed the position on July 1, 2017. He concurrently held professorships in history and the classics.

On October 22, 2020, Johns Hopkins President Ronald Daniels named Celenza as James B. Knapp Dean of the Krieger School of Arts and Sciences, effective January 4, 2021.

Academic offices
| Preceded by Beverly Wendland | James B. Knapp Dean of the Krieger School of Arts and Sciences; 2021–present | Incumbent |
| Preceded by Chester Gillis | Dean of Georgetown College; 2017–2020 | Succeeded by Rosario Ceballo |
| Preceded by Carmela Vircillo Franklin | 21st Director of the American Academy in Rome; 2010–2014 | Succeeded by Kimberly Bowes |
