= University of North Carolina academic-athletic scandal =

2010–2014 academic fraud case

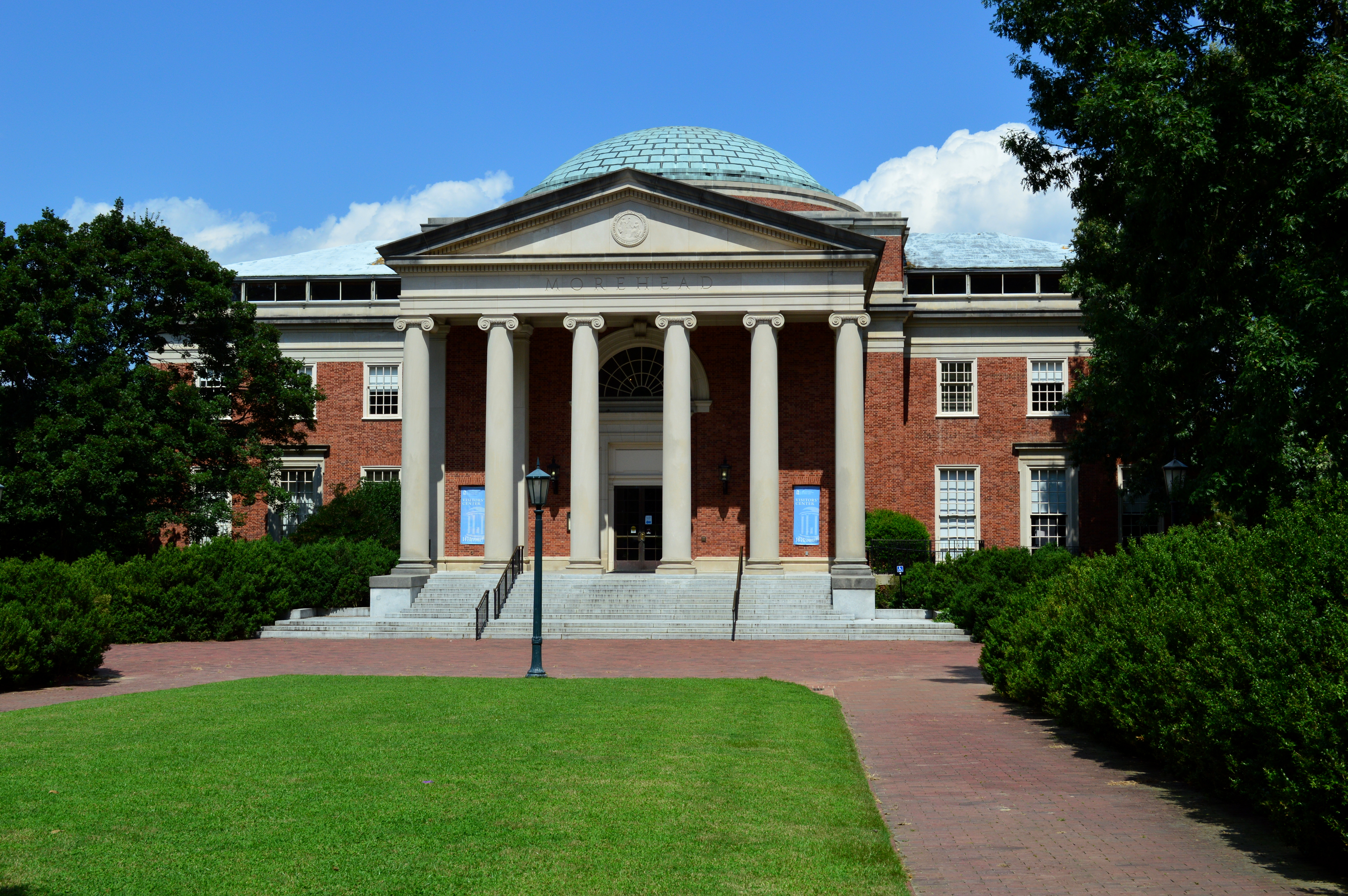
The Planetarium at the University of North Carolina, Chapel Hill.

The University of North Carolina academic-athletic scandal involved alleged fraud and academic dishonesty committed at the University of North Carolina at Chapel Hill (UNC). Following a lesser scandal that began in 2010 involving academic fraud and improper benefits with the university's football program, two hundred questionable classes offered by the university's African and Afro-American Studies department (commonly known as AFAM) came to light. As a result, the university was placed on probation by its accrediting agency.

An internal investigation by the university released in 2011 and another investigation commissioned by former North Carolina governor Jim Martin in 2012 found numerous academic and ethical issues with the AFAM department, including unauthorized grade changes and faculty signatures, a disproportionate number of independent study class offerings relative to other departments, and an over-representation of student-athletes enrolled in such classes. In 2014, a series of charges and counter-charges began between university officials and former learning specialist Mary Willingham, including disputes about statistics and methods of analysis by Willingham alleging that certain student-athletes were not academically qualified for college. As a result of these revelations, the Southern Association of Colleges and Schools placed the university on probation for one year, endangering the university's regional accreditation. Losing accreditation would have resulted in the loss of any federal funding or support.

The university introduced new standards, protocols and rules to prevent misadministration within academic departments in the future. As a result, UNC exited probation and regained full standing by June 2016. The National Collegiate Athletic Association (NCAA) then completed its own investigation in October 2017, finding no violations of its rules, largely due to the fact that the NCAA does not have oversight authority for university academic programs.

The controversy sparked debate as to whether the university educated some of its student-athletes improperly and called into question the role of NCAA Division I athletics relative to the academic mission of NCAA-member colleges and universities.

== Background ==
=== North Carolina football scandal ===
Greg Barnes of Inside Carolina initially broke the scandal with ESPN following closely behind. On July 15, 2010, ESPN reported that the NCAA interviewed several North Carolina football players over alleged gifts, extra benefits, and sports agent involvement. Reportedly, the investigation began after North Carolina defensive tackle Marvin Austin made a post on Twitter on May 29, 2010, containing a reference to a nightclub in Miami in which a sports agent's party had taken place two months earlier. The university later suspended Austin and over ten other football players from the team. On October 11, 2010, Austin was dismissed from the football team, and the NCAA declared wide receiver Greg Little and defensive end Robert Quinn "permanently ineligible" due to receiving improper benefits.

On August 26, 2010, the NCAA began a separate investigation of North Carolina football that involved possible academic fraud involving a tutor in the university's academic support program. The tutor was later identified as Jennifer Wiley (as of 2013 known as Jennifer Wiley Thompson due to marriage). Another source familiar with the investigation said that Wiley was accused of "inappropriate help on papers that football players were required to write for classes." However, Baddour said on September 24 that Wiley declined to cooperate with the NCAA.

Because the university felt that the NCAA investigation was extremely embarrassing to its reputation, North Carolina fired football head coach Butch Davis on July 27, 2011. The next day, athletic director Dick Baddour announced that he would resign and allow chancellor Holden Thorp to hire a new football head coach.

On March 12, 2012, the NCAA issued formal sanctions against North Carolina football: a postseason ban for the 2012 season, reductions of 15 scholarships, and 3 years of probation. The NCAA found North Carolina guilty of multiple infractions, including academic fraud and failure to monitor the football program. However, the NCAA did not find more serious violations amounting to what would constitute a lack of institutional control, explaining that the university "educated its tutors regarding academic improprieties and its coaches regarding outside athletically related income ... self-discovered the academic fraud and took decisive action ... cooperated fully, is not a repeat violator and ... exhibited appropriate control over its athletics program." In November 2013, the university sent a letter of disassociation to Austin, Little, and Quinn.

== Academic irregularities and punishment ==
The crux of the alleged irregularities proceeded from the UNC Department of African and Afro-American Studies. Over approximately fifteen years, the department offered two hundred independent study courses, many without full adherence to University procedure for course provisioning or sufficient professorial oversight. The irregularities called into question the department's academic integrity and led to the Southern Association of Colleges and Schools putting the university on academic probation for one year, a rare action against a major research university.

=== Overview ===
The March 3, 2014 Bloomberg BusinessWeek magazine had a cover story by Paul M. Barrett alleging academic improprieties by the University of North Carolina at Chapel Hill regarding student-athletes.

A basic charge by critics was that UNC did not live up to its end of the bargain by not sufficiently educating some of its student-athletes. Rebecca Schuman of Slate.com accused the university of "abjectly failing some of its students" by keeping them "functionally illiterate."

Gerald Gurney, president of the Drake Group for Academic Integrity in College Sport, called UNC "the mother of all academic fraud violations" because of "cooperation of friendly faculty and [a] cover-up." Paul M. Barrett, in a cover story for the March 3, 2014 edition of Bloomberg Businessweek magazine, wrote: "... rather than seriously investigate the connection between sports and classroom corruption, top university administrators used vague committee reports to obfuscate the issue." Reporter Dan Kane of the News & Observer was part of a three-person investigative team that exposed the scandal, causing UNC fans and some faculty to accuse Kane of conducting a witch hunt for a conspiracy that did not exist.

In a 2021 article about the scandal, journalist and UNC alum Andy Thomason concluded that no nefarious individuals could be blamed for the scandal, but instead the substandard classes were the result of a series of decisions by multiple people, mostly well-intentioned, operating for years under the powerful forces of money-making college athletics.

=== Initial accusations ===
Suspicions about the UNC Department of African and Afro-American Studies were raised as early as 2011. UNC defensive end Michael McAdoo filed a lawsuit against the NCAA on July 1, 2011, seeking reinstatement to the football team. The NCAA declared McAdoo ineligible for accepting improper benefits and committing academic fraud, based on the UNC Undergraduate Honor Court finding that McAdoo committed academic dishonesty by having Jennifer Wiley complete a bibliography and works-cited section on a research paper for an AFAM class. From this lawsuit, McAdoo was forced to make public the paper; an analysis by Dan Kane of the Raleigh News & Observer found that the Honor Court failed to find multiple instances of plagiarism in McAdoo's paper. On July 13, a North Carolina Superior Court judge in Durham refused to grant an injunction against the NCAA, thus upholding ineligibility for McAdoo.

Then in August, Dan Kane reported that football player Marvin Austin took a 400-level course in the department the summer before his freshman fall semester. According to an academic adviser at the university, "it is unusual for any freshman to begin his or her college education with a 400 level course." On September 1, 2011, just over a week after Kane's article about Austin's transcript was published, AFAM department chair Julius Nyang'oro resigned from his executive position but remained on faculty.

More controversy for AFAM came after the transcript of former North Carolina football and basketball player Julius Peppers was found under a University of North Carolina web address (www.unc.edu) by members of PackPride, a Scout.com community for fans of rival school NC State. A university staffer originally posted the transcript with Peppers's identifying information removed on a secure UNC server as a test record in 2001. Six years later, another staffer mistakenly moved the test record to an unsecured server. The transcript showed a cumulative grade point average of 1.82 from the summer 1998 to spring 2001 terms with 11 grades of D or F. Additionally, Peppers's grades for AFAM classes were on average higher than for non-AFAM classes, and Peppers was never academically ineligible for athletic competition despite his grades. Through his agent, Peppers confirmed that the transcript was his and stated that there was "no academic fraud." University chancellor Holden Thorp later apologized to Peppers.

=== Reviews of AFAM ===
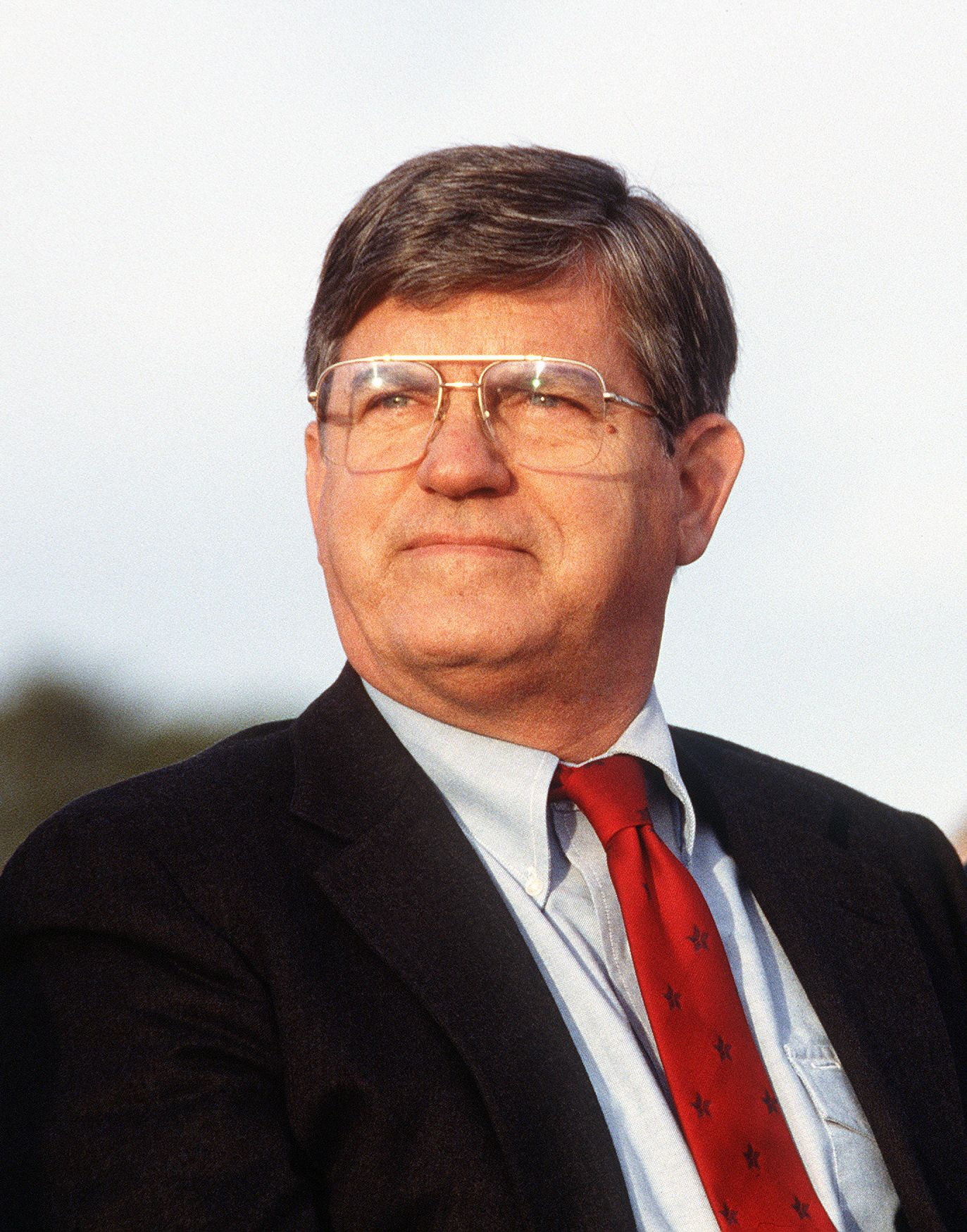
Former North Carolina governor Jim Martin commissioned a 2012 report that reviewed irregularities in the UNC Department of African and Afro-American Studies.

On May 2, 2012, UNC released the results of an internal investigation into AFAM courses commissioned by Jonathan Hartlyn, senior associate dean for social sciences and global programs, and William L. Andrews, senior associate dean for fine arts and humanities. The report examined AFAM classes from the summer 2007 to summer 2011 sessions. Among the findings in the Hartlyn-Andrews report:

- Thirty-six percent of students enrolled in questionable AFAM classes were football players.
- There was no evidence showing that student-athletes who took AFAM classes received preferential treatment.
- AFAM administrator Deborah Crowder likely oversaw scheduling and grade rosters of questionable classes.
- Nearly nine classes lacked evidence that a professor taught course material and graded work. For one Swahili class, the syllabus listed AFAM chair Julius Nyang'oro as professor, but Nyang'oro told university investigators that he did not teach that class. For 40 other courses listing Nyang'oro as instructor, mostly during summer sessions, a professor was present during class but seldom taught.

=== Martin Report (2012) ===
On December 19, 2012, UNC released a report, commissioned by former North Carolina governor Jim Martin, in collaboration with accounting firm Baker Tilly Virchow Krause, LLP. The report examined data back to the 1990s. Among its findings:

- Student-athletes were disproportionately enrolled in suspect classes.
- From the 1990s through 2011, AFAM offered two hundred lecture courses that never took place, as well as offering dubious independent study programs that required little work to complete. Also, some professors never showed up to teach classes. In some instances, the only course requirement of students was to submit a paper at the end of the class.
- In "dozens of instances", eight professors "were unwittingly and indirectly compromised" when their signatures were forged by others on grade rosters. However, no evidence showed that any other faculty member than Julius Nyang'oro or Deborah Crowder was involved in wrongdoing.
- Among grade changes for student-athletes, 106 were identified as "unauthorized", 454 as "potentially unauthorized", 373 were "inconclusive", and 203 were legitimate.

There were felony fraud charges brought against Nyang'oro for being paid $12,000 to teach a non-existent class, but these charges were dropped by the Orange County district attorney based on recommendations from Kenneth Wainstein in exchange for Nyang'oro's cooperation.

=== Accusations by Mary Willingham ===
The athletic scholarship is just a lottery ticket with room and board, and a few concussions. Or, if you like Willy Wonka, it's the golden ticket to win a tour here at our factory – where, by the way, you might get injured, or damaged. And there's no insurance, no worker's comp and no salary for your labor.

— Mary Willingham, in 2014

One of the academic tutors assigned to help student-athletes was Mary Willingham, who was hired by the university in 2003 to assist student-athletes with their academic work. Willingham's 2009 Master of Arts thesis for the University of North Carolina at Greensboro was titled Academics & athletics - a clash of cultures: Division I football programs and asserted in part: "While admission standards are on the rise at major public universities, many under-prepared student-athletes (football) are admitted each year because they are the 'best' player in the state/country, creating academic disparities." In a November 2012 interview with Dan Kane of The News & Observer, Willingham made her initial claims about the university helping student-athletes stay eligible via improper assistance. In 2013, the Drake Group gave Willingham the Robert Maynard Hutchins Award for being "a university faculty or staff member who defends the institution's academic integrity in the face of college athletics."

In early 2014, Willingham approached national media to express her concerns about the university. In interviews with Sara Ganim of CNN in January and Paul M. Barrett of Bloomberg Businessweek in March, Willingham alleged:

- Students accessed a team-maintained computer hard drive which contained a database of previous papers, and submitted recycled documents with cosmetic changes.
- Some student-athletes reading below college levels. In an interview with CNN, Willingham claimed that 60% of 183 UNC football and basketball players, which she analyzed from 2004 to 2012, were reading at fourth- to eighth-grade levels, and that 10% read below a third-grade level.
- She steered academically disadvantaged student-athletes towards enrolling in sham AFAM lecture courses.
- The university was playing a "shell game" to prevent student-athletes from having to do any serious studying.

In response to Willingham's claims about student-athlete literacy, UNC released another report by a board of educational experts outside the university that examined data between 2004 and 2012. That report found that there were 341 men's and women's basketball players and football players during these years; of this group, 34 students did not meet CNN's threshold of being "college literate", which meant a minimum SAT reading score of 400 or an ACT score of 16; essentially, the university suggested that of its athletes, ten percent had academic issues. This is in contrast with the allegation by Mary Willingham, based on her personal investigations, that 60% of college athletes were not "college literate". In another of her analyses, she found that 150 to 200 of 400 student-athletes were "underperforming", some "badly underperforming", with the last group being mostly made of men's and women's players of basketball and football. One view suggested that the university's response to these and other allegations was to try to change the focus away from wrongdoing, in part by challenging Willingham's assertions and research. The review board disputed her findings on the grounds that her methodology was not appropriate.

Willingham was also interviewed by Bernard Goldberg in a report for HBO's Real Sports with Bryant Gumbel that was broadcast on March 25, 2014. The report was a general look at how some top NCAA Division I schools hire learning specialists like Willingham to help keep student-athletes eligible. A representative for UNC stated in response that HBO reported on "information that has previously been reported and discussed."

A segment by ESPN's Outside the Lines from March 25, 2014 drew attention because Willingham showed a 146-word essay about Rosa Parks and claimed that an unnamed student-athlete at UNC earned an A-minus in an AFAM class for turning that essay in. However, according to Slate.com, the paper shown by Willingham "was most likely a draft of one piece of a take-home final for a legitimate introductory course." The News & Observer stated in a clarification note to a story that mentioned that essay: "It is unclear what grade the student received for the essay. Willingham said it was a class that met, and had other assignments."

In April 2014, Willingham announced her resignation. In June 2014, Willingham filed a lawsuit against UNC.

In August 2014, citing posts in the Scout.com UNC message board Inside Carolina, Dan Kane reported in The News & Observer that passages in Willingham's 2009 master's thesis appeared to be plagiarized.

=== Accusations by Rashad McCants ===
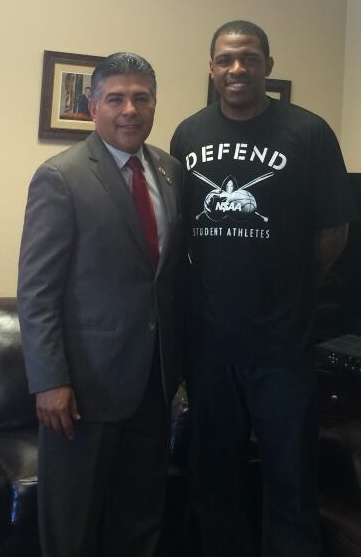
Rashad McCants, a member of the North Carolina basketball team that won the 2005 NCAA championship, received national attention for claiming to have had a substandard education at North Carolina. He met with Representative Tony Cárdenas (left) to discuss NCAA reform issues.

North Carolina guard Rashad McCants is required to go to class, to show up on time for practice and to attend study hall. He has very little of the freedom most college students take for granted.

— Associated Press reporter Keith Parsons in a 2004 profile of McCants

When you get to college, you don't go to class, you don't do nothing, you just show up and play ... That's exactly how it was, you know, and I think that was the tradition of college basketball, or college, period, any sport. You're not there to get an education, though they tell you that.

— Rashad McCants, speaking on Outside the Lines in 2014

The question is what are we talking about, honestly. I mean I have a check being written to me from the University of North Carolina for over $10 million due to the exploitation of me as a player and the lack of education that I received. The NCAA has a check for me for over $300 million to help me facilitate these sports education programs across the country. These are things that's in the works.

— Rashad McCants, speaking on Mark Packers' Sirius XM radio show in 2014

On June 6, 2014, the ESPN program Outside the Lines broadcast an interview with Rashad McCants, who was a starter on the North Carolina basketball team that won the 2005 NCAA championship, in which McCants claimed to have taken phony classes and had tutors write his classwork. However, all sixteen other members of the 2005 team released a statement which disputed McCants's account. Additionally, coach Roy Williams, separately interviewed by the same program, disputed McCants's claims. In contrast, in a noted 2004 interview with television station WRAL, McCants compared attending UNC with being in jail.

Interviewed again on Outside the Lines on June 11, McCants stood by his claims about his academic experience at North Carolina. He also called on his fellow members of the 2004–05 basketball team to release their university transcripts because, in his opinion, "the truth is there in the transcripts" regarding bogus classes.

University officials contacted McCants via mail and text message in the days following ESPN's initial interview with McCants, because McCants expressed "knowledge of potential NCAA rule violations involving the University of North Carolina," according to a letter signed by the athletics director of compliance. However, McCants had not responded as of July 7, nor had he discussed his claims with the NCAA, according to the Associated Press. Investigators for the Wainstein Report, released in October 2014, also noted that no evidence had been produced by McCants that substantiated his claims.

== Actions by the university ==
=== Wainstein Report (2014) ===
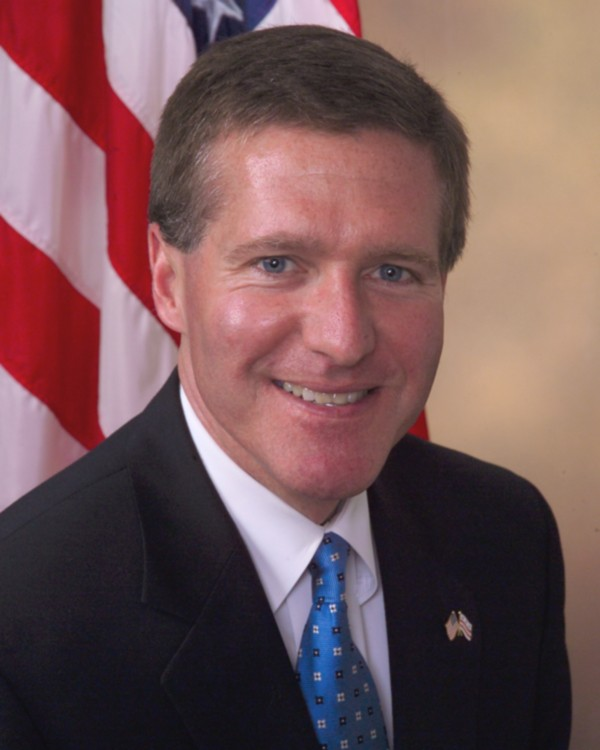
Former U.S. Department of Justice official Kenneth L. Wainstein commissioned an independent investigative report of the UNC AFAM department.

In February 2014, the university hired Kenneth L. Wainstein, a former official in the United States Department of Justice, to conduct an independent investigation.

Our goal is to create an academic success program that is one of the best, if not the leader, among peer universities.

— Joel Curran, UNC vice chancellor of communications

On October 22, 2014, the report was released reporting that for 18 years, at least 3,100 students enrolled in what were described as "paper" classes, which were independent study classes that had no faculty involvement. The report conveyed that "counselors saw the paper classes and the artificially high grades they yielded as key to helping some student-athletes remain eligible." The report named both Julius Nyang'oro and Debbie Crowder as facilitators of the practice.

=== Reforms ===
More than 70 reforms have been instituted. These included better governance standards, more accountability for support programs for student-athletes, new department structures, and more classroom audits and oversight of courses, according to a university source. Employees called checkers were sent to classes to see whether, in fact, they were being held, as part of an improved auditing system. Further, university officials made statements which affirmed that they were proud of the accomplishments of their sports programs and varsity teams. An athletics director spoke highly of the university's scholarship program; one said most of their student-athletes graduate and have successful careers. Some officials criticized the allegations; for example, a basketball coach objected that the allegations had slandered the "moral character of his players."

The NCAA scholarships that students have been awarded for the past 50 years are the best scholarship program ever created with the possible exception of the GI Bill. While they're not perfect, sports scholarships certainly provide great opportunities for an awful lot of students.

— Bubba Cunningham, UNC athletic director

== Conclusion ==
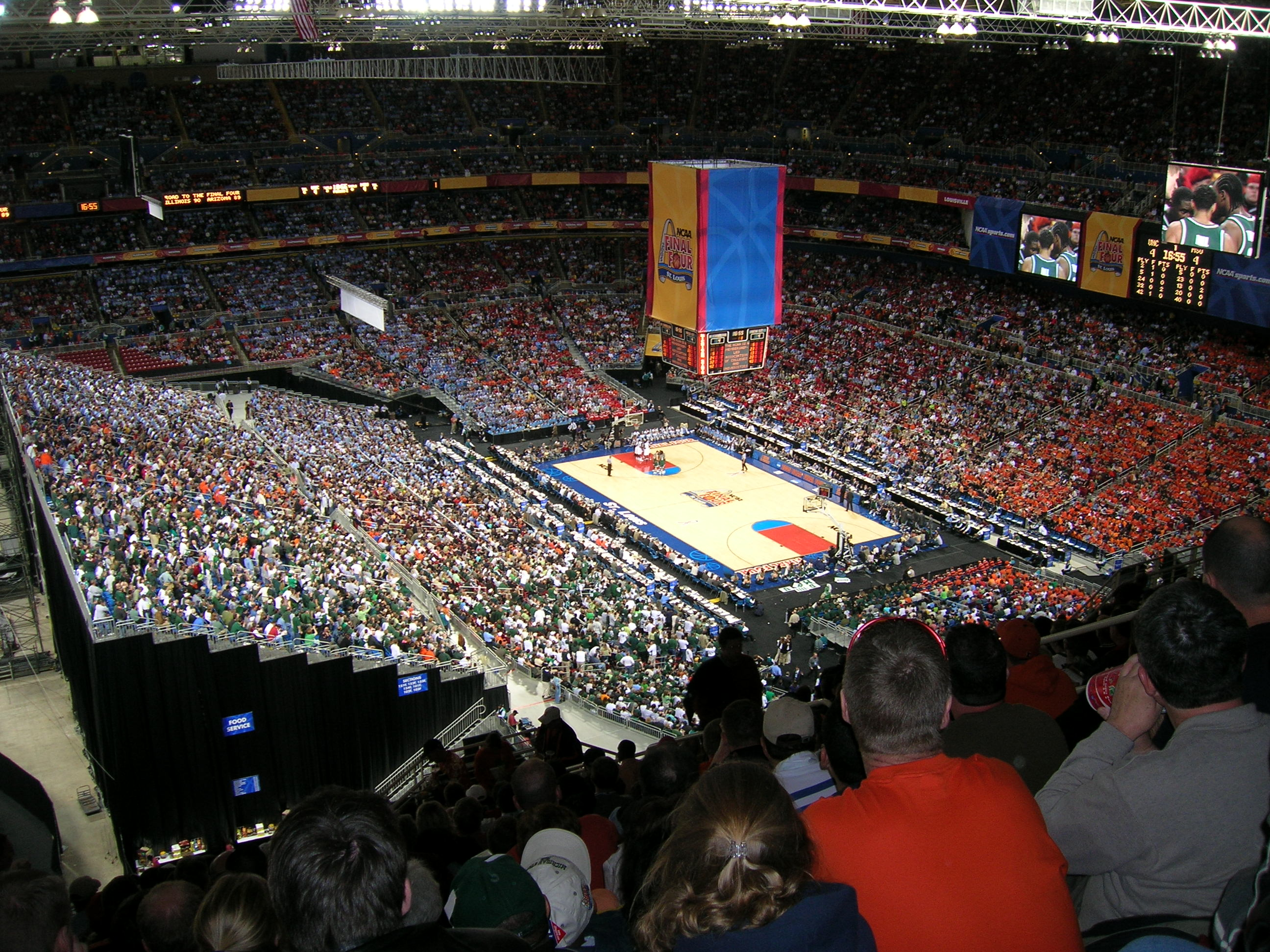
North Carolina versus Michigan State basketball game

On October 13, 2017, the NCAA announced it would not levy penalties against North Carolina, saying it "could not conclude that the University of North Carolina violated N.C.A.A. academic rules." In their defense, North Carolina cited cases where Auburn and Michigan had similar misconduct and the NCAA did not act. It was ultimately concluded by the panel that the courses were for the entire student body, not just the student-athletes. The panel did conclude that since Nyang'oro did not cooperate with the investigation he was issued a five-year show-cause period as punishment for him, "any NCAA member school employing the [Nyang'oro] must show cause why he should not have restrictions on athletically related activity."

Committee on Infractions head for the NCAA, Greg Sankey, stated "While student-athletes likely benefited from the so-called 'paper courses' offered by North Carolina, the information available in the record did not establish that the courses were solely created, offered and maintained as an orchestrated effort to benefit student-athletes." North Carolina chancellor Carol Folt commented on the resolution of the case when she said "I believe we have done everything possible to correct and move beyond the past academic irregularities and have established very robust processes to prevent them from recurring." Tyrone P. Thomas, a lawyer for Mintz Levin and does work with colleges and universities, felt the ruling was "... a massive loophole, and from the P.R. side it looks horrible — these athletes can do what they do, and it looks horrible. But guess what? Maybe that's not the N.C.A.A.'s job. This is something the schools have always self-regulated."

== See also ==
- List of sporting scandals
