= Buck Goldstein =

American entrepreneur

- Born: March 11, 1948 (age 78)
- Education: The University of North Carolina at Chapel Hill
- Occupations: Entrepreneur, Professor of Practice, blogger, author

Buck Goldstein (born March 11, 1948, in Atlanta, Georgia) is the Entrepreneur in Residence and Professor of Practice in the Department of Economics at the University of North Carolina at Chapel Hill. He is the co-author, with Holden Thorp, of two books: Engines of Innovation – The Entrepreneurial University in the 21st Century, in which they contend that the world’s biggest problems can be effectively addressed by large research universities through a combination of skillful innovation and execution; and Our Higher Calling—Rebuilding the Partnership Between America and its Colleges and Universities in which they contend that the informal compact between American higher education and the public is broken and must be restored. He was named Entrepreneur of the Year by the Information Industry Association and Information America, the company he co-founded, has appeared numerous times on the Inc. 500 list of fastest growing companies.

== Education ==
Goldstein attended public school in Miami Beach, Florida, and graduated from Miami Beach Senior High School in 1966. He received his B.A. with Honors from the University of North Carolina at Chapel Hill in 1970 where he was elected to Phi Beta Kappa and the Order of the Golden Fleece. He received a M.Ed. from the University of Massachusetts in 1973 and a J.D. with Honors from the University of North Carolina at Chapel Hill in 1976, where he served on the editorial board of the North Carolina Law Review.

Goldstein never enrolled in a business course during his undergraduate or graduate career. The first time he attended a formal business class was when he spoke to a marketing class at the UNC Kenan–Flagler Business School about his success as an entrepreneur.

== Entrepreneurship ==
Buck Goldstein has been involved in entrepreneurship most of his professional life. After four years of working at a corporate law firm, he co-founded Information America, an online information company that was the first to make courthouse information available from remote terminals in lawyer’s offices. The business began as a two-person start-up and grew to over $40,000,000 in revenues, eventually going public and trading on the NASDAQ. Customers included virtually every major law firm in the United States, most of the Fortune 500 and many large federal agencies including the FBI, the DEA and the CIA. In 1994, Information America was acquired by West Publishing, the largest legal publisher in the world and soon after was acquired by Thomson Corporation, a multinational information publishing company.

He later founded NetWorth Partners, a venture capital fund focusing on information-based enterprises with Mellon Ventures as its largest investor and subsequently became a partner in Mellon Ventures, a subsidiary of Mellon Bank. As a partner, Goldstein invested in a number of emerging businesses and served on the Board of Directors of over 15 companies.

Upon moving to Chapel Hill in 2004, Goldstein served as Chairman of MedFusion, a Raleigh-based medical information technology company acquired by Intuit in 2010, and as Board Observer and advisor for iContact, an email marketing company based in the Research Triangle Park acquired by Vocus in 2012. Additionally, Goldstein has served as an advisor to Liquidia, a nano-technology company founded in the UNC chemistry department, and as a board member of Nourish International, a non-profit organization that engages college students across the United States in on campus social businesses and international poverty reduction projects.

Over the years, Goldstein has served on a variety of non-profit boards, including chairman of the Institute of Arts and Humanities advisory board at UNC-Chapel Hill, president of the Atlanta Chapter of the American Jewish Committee, and board member of the High Museum of Art in Atlanta. He currently serves on the Board of the Institute for the Arts and Humanities, the Ackland Art Museum and the Chancellor’s Think Tank, all at UNC and as an advisor to the Martha’s Vineyard Book Festival.

Goldstein joined the university faculty at the University of North Carolina at Chapel Hill in 2004 to help build The Carolina Entrepreneurial Initiative, a project to make a broad definition of entrepreneurship part of the intellectual culture of the campus and support students and faculty to turn innovative ideas into self-sustaining enterprises. The UNC entrepreneurship curriculum has been named by a variety of national publications as among the nation’s best. Goldstein recruits alumni and other university supporters with entrepreneurial expertise to serve as mentors for faculty and student projects and to provide off-campus internships for students. As Professor of the Practice at the university, he teaches both small seminars and large lecture courses in entrepreneurship and supports the continuing development of the undergraduate Minor in Entrepreneurship and its internship program.

"I want to make entrepreneurship a part of the fabric of the university," Goldstein said in an interview, "We want to develop both business and social entrepreneurs. We want to give students and faculty members the tools to turn ideas into reality."

Goldstein and Holden Thorp co-authored Engines of Innovation – The Entrepreneurial University in the 21st Century, suggesting that the top 125 U.S. research universities can play a crucial role in revitalizing the American economy. They also co-authored Engines of Innovation—Rebuilding the Partnership Between America and its Colleges and Universities which argues the partnership between American higher education and the public is broken and must be rebuilt.

== Awards ==
- Featured on Inc 500 list of rapidly growing businesses
- Featured in "Who’s Who in Technology" Atlanta Business Chronicle, 22 October 2001
- Entrepreneur of the Year Award, Information Industry Association and Information America, 1991
- Fast Tech 50, Arthur Andersen LLP, Atlanta, 1988
