= Nancy Brickhouse =

American academic

Provost of Baylor University
- In office 2019 – July 2026

Provost of Saint Louis University
- In office 1 April 2015 – June 2018
- Succeeded by: Chester Gillis

Personal details
- Born: October 24, 1960 (age 66) Texas, U.S.
- Education: Baylor University (BA); Purdue University (MS, PhD)
- Website: Office of the Provost

Nancy Brickhouse (born October 24, 1960) is an American academic currently serving as provost at Baylor University. Prior to her position at Baylor, she was the provost of Saint Louis University.

She holds a B.A in chemistry from Baylor University, and also holds an M.S and PhD from Purdue University. Brickhouse started her career working in rural district schools in northeastern Texas teaching physics, physical science, and chemistry.

She worked at the University of Delaware for 27 years before becoming Saint Louis University provost. At Delaware, she held a number of roles, including interim provost and deputy dean of the College of Education and Human Development. She was also a part of the task force that established the first set of science standards for the university.

In 2018, she resigned as provost of Saint Louis University, returning to the school's education department. In February 2019, she was announced as the incoming provost of Baylor University, and stepped into the role in May of that same year.

In summer 2026, Dr. Brickhouse resigned as provost from Baylor University and started a new role as the vice chancellor for academic and health affairs in the Texas State University System (TSUS).[8]

== Notes ==
8. ^Dr. Nancy Brickhouse Named TSUS Vice Chancellor for Academic and Health Affairs
