= Beong-Soo Kim =

President of the University of Southern California

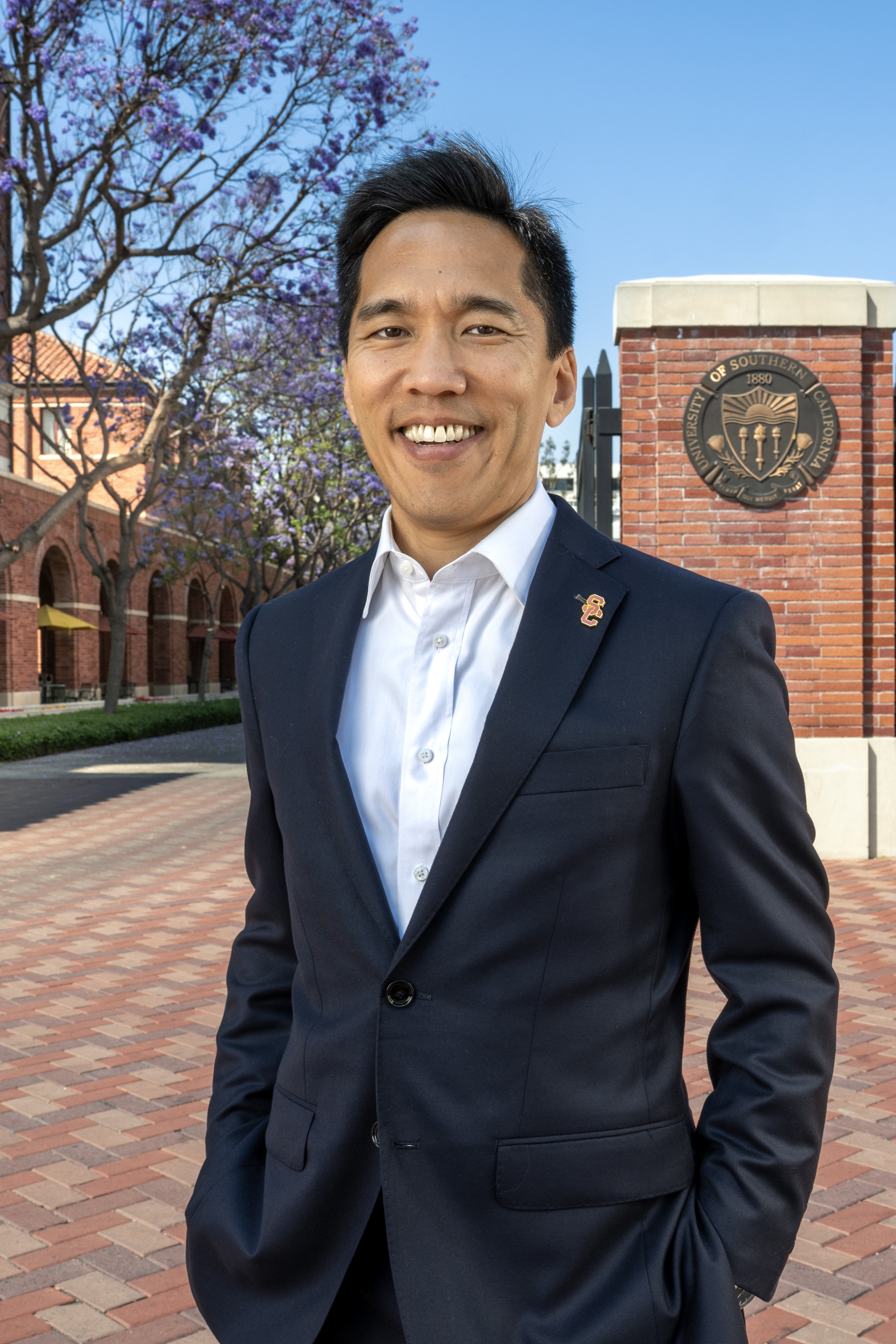
- Kim in 2025

13th President of the University of Southern California
- Incumbent
- Assumed office July 1, 2025
- Preceded by: Carol Folt

Personal details
- Born: 1972 (age 53–54) Harbor City, California, U.S.
- Children: 2
- Education: Harvard University (BA, JD); London School of Economics (MSc)

Beong-Soo Kim (born 1972) is an American lawyer who has been the president of the University of Southern California (USC) since February 2026. He was USC's senior vice president and general counsel from July 2020 to June 2025 and interim president from July 2025 to February 2026.

== Early life and education ==
Kim was born in Harbor City, California, and raised in Woodland Hills. His parents, who emigrated from South Korea, both attended graduate school at USC. While attending Calabasas High School, Kim studied the cello with Eleonore Schoenfeld, a professor at the USC Thornton School of Music.

Kim attended Harvard College, where he wrote for The Harvard Crimson, led the Harvard CIVICS program, and played in the Harvard-Radcliffe Orchestra. He graduated magna cum laude and as a member of Phi Beta Kappa. He subsequently earned an M.Sc. from the London School of Economics as a Rotary Scholar, and worked as a New York City Urban Fellow. He graduated from Harvard Law School with honors in 1999.

== Career ==
=== Legal career ===
Kim began his legal career as a law clerk to Judge Robert D. Sack of the United States Court of Appeals for the Second Circuit. After his clerkship, he taught constitutional interpretation as a teaching fellow at Harvard University and worked as an associate at Munger, Tolles & Olson, LLP.

Kim then spent nine years as a federal prosecutor at the United States Attorney's Office for the Central District of California. While working at the U.S. Attorney's Office, he taught as an adjunct professor at the USC Gould School of Law. During his time as a prosecutor, Kim handled cases involving fraud and eventually became chief of the Major Frauds section. He returned to the U.S. Attorney's Office in 2022 to deliver a talk on Asian-American legacy-building.

Following his federal service, Kim worked as a partner at Jones Day before moving to Kaiser Permanente, where he spent nearly six years as vice president.

=== University of Southern California ===
==== General counsel ====
In July 2020, Kim was appointed senior vice president and general counsel of USC. As general counsel, he led several major strategic initiatives and advised the senior leadership team and Board of Trustees on matters affecting the University, Keck Medicine, and athletics. He served as senior vice president and general counsel of USC from July 2020 to June 2025.

==== USC President ====
On February 5, 2025, USC announced that Kim would serve as interim president beginning July 1, 2025, following Carol Folt's announced retirement. The appointment was announced by USC Board of Trustees Chair Suzanne Nora Johnson and Vice Chair David C. Bohnett, who praised Kim's "impeccable character, strong and collaborative leadership and a broad understanding of our academic research and medical enterprises, as well as our athletics programs."

The appointment came after Folt announced in November 2024 that she would retire at the end of her six-year tenure in June 2025. USC established a Presidential Search Committee, led by Trustees Carmen Nava and Mark Stevens, to select the school's next permanent president.

On February 4, 2026, the USC Board of Trustees announced that Kim had been unanimously elected the 13th president of the university.

== Personal life ==
Kim is married to Bonnie Wongtrakool, an investment manager. They are both amateur musicians. They have two children together.
