= Chester Gillis =

American academic

Provost of Saint Louis University
- In office December 2019 – May 2020
- Preceded by: Nancy Brickhouse
- Succeeded by: Michael Lewis

Dean of Georgetown College
- In office 2008–2017
- Preceded by: Jane Dammen McAuliffe
- Succeeded by: Christopher Celenza

Personal details
- Education: KU Leuven (PhB, PhL, MA); University of Chicago (PhD)

Chester L. Gillis is the former Dean of Georgetown College, Professor in the Department of Theology, and the founding Director of the Program on the Church and Interreligious Dialogue in the Berkley Center for Religion, Peace, and World Affairs at Georgetown University. In 2017, Gillis concluded as Dean of Georgetown College and returned to the faculty. In January 2019, he assumed the position of interim provost at Saint Louis University. He left his position as interim provost of Saint Louis University May 2020.

== Education ==
Gillis received his Bachelor of Philosophy, Licentiate of Philosophy, and Master of Arts in religious studies from the Catholic University of Leuven. He then received his Doctor of Philosophy in theology from the University of Chicago.

== Research and publication ==
Chester Gillis' research interests include comparative religion and contemporary Roman Catholicism. He is the author of A Question of Final Belief: John Hick's Pluralistic Theory of Salvation (1989), Pluralism: A New Paradigm for Theology (1993), Roman Catholicism in America, [Catholic Book Club Book of the Month Selection, July 1999], Catholic Faith in America (2003), and editor of The Political Papacy (2006), Roman Catholicism in America, Second Edition (2019) as well as numerous articles, book chapters, and encyclopedia entries. He is co-editor of the Columbia University series Religion and Politics.

== Academic leadership ==
Gillis served as Chair of the Department of Theology from 2001 to 2006, the Core Faculty of the Liberal Studies Program from 1998 to 2008, and Director of the Doctor of Liberal Studies from 2006 to 2008. He received the Excellence in Teaching Award from the Liberal Studies Program at Georgetown (2005). He also served on the Executive Faculty at Georgetown and is a member of the Jesuit Honor Society Alpha Sigma Nu. In 2008, Gillis became the Dean of Georgetown College, succeeding Jane Dammen McAuliffe. He held this position he held until 2017, when he was succeeded by Christopher Celenza. In January 2019, he became the interim provost of Saint Louis University. He left the position in May 2020, and was succeeded by Michael Lewis as interim provost.

He has chaired the Arts and Humanities Committee for the Heinz Awards and served on the selection committee for The Louisville Institute's grants. He chaired the national Teaching Award Committee for the Association of Graduate Liberal Studies and served on the editorial board of Confluence: Journal of Graduate Liberal Studies. A member of the American Theological Society, he served on the Academic Relations Task Force of the American Academy of Religion.

Frequently consulted by the media about contemporary issues in religion, in particular, Roman Catholicism, Dean Gillis has appeared on Face the Nation, Meet the Press, The News Hour, ABC, NBC, and CBS Evening News, Good Morning America, Nightline, and National Public Radio and is a contributor to the Washington Post/Newsweek website On Faith.

He holds a Licentiate in Philosophy and an M.A. in Religious Studies from the Catholic University at Leuven in Belgium and earned his Ph.D. from the University of Chicago Divinity School.

== Writings ==
- Roman Catholicism in America (ISBN 0-231-10870-2, ISBN 0-231-10871-0): ISBN 9780231142670
- Pluralism: A New Paradigm for Theology (ISBN 0-8028-0572-8)
- The Political Papacy: John Paul II, Benedictine XVI and Their Influence (ISBN 1-59451-181-0)
- A Question of Final Belief: John Hick's Pluralistic Theory of Salvation (ISBN 0-312-01863-0)
- Catholic Faith in America (ISBN 0-8160-4984-X)

Academic offices
| Preceded by Nancy Brickhouse | Interim Provost of Saint Louis University; 2019–2020 | Succeeded by Michael Lewis |
| Preceded by Jane Dammen McAuliffe | Dean of Georgetown College; 2008–2017 | Succeeded by Christopher Celenza |
