= Evan H. Caminker =

American lawyer (born 1961)

Evan Caminker

16th Dean of University of Michigan Law School
- In office 2003–2013
- Preceded by: Jeffrey S. Lehman
- Succeeded by: Mark D. West

Personal details
- Born: June 26, 1961 (age 65) Los Angeles, California, U.S.
- Education: University of California, Los Angeles (BA); Yale University (JD)

Academic work
- Sub-discipline: Constitutional law
- Institutions: University of Michigan Law School

Evan H. Caminker (born June 26, 1961) is a dean emeritus of the University of Michigan Law School. As dean, he succeeded Jeffrey S. Lehman, who resigned to become president of Cornell University. Caminker was appointed Dean just as the United States Supreme Court issued a landmark ruling upholding the constitutionality of the Law School's affirmative action admissions policies, which had been challenged in a lawsuit filed by the Center for Individual Rights.

== Education and career ==
Caminker earned a B.A. in political economy and environmental studies, summa cum laude, from the University of California, Los Angeles, and his Juris Doctor degree from Yale Law School, where he was a senior editor of the Yale Law Journal. He clerked for Judge William A. Norris of the United States Court of Appeals for the Ninth Circuit, and Justice William Brennan of the United States Supreme Court.

Caminker was announced as Dean of the University of Michigan Law School in January 2003, and served as Dean until 2013. Prior to going to the University of Michigan, Caminker was a faculty member at the UCLA School of Law from 1991 to 1999. He has practiced law with the Center for Law in the Public Interest in Los Angeles, and as a deputy assistant attorney general in the United States Department of Justice. As a scholar, his research is focused on constitutional law and the nature of judicial decision making.

== See also ==
- List of law clerks for the third seat of the Supreme Court of the United States

Academic offices
Preceded by Jeffrey S. Lehman	Dean of the University of Michigan Law School; 2003–2013	Succeeded by Mark D. West
