= Ramseier =

Ramseier is a surname. Notable people with the name include:

- Mikhail W. Ramseier (born 1964), Swiss writer
- Daniel Ramseier (born 1963), Swiss equestrian
- David Ramseier (born 1987), Swiss-French basketball player
- Doris Ramseier (born 1939), Swiss equestrian
- Peter Ramseier (born 1944), Swiss football player

== See also ==
- Ramseier Glacier, is a steep cirque-type glacier, 5 nautical miles (9 km) long, flowing southwest to enter Byrd Glacier immediately east of Mount Rummage
- Ramseyer
