= Carol Folt =

American academic administrator (born 1951)

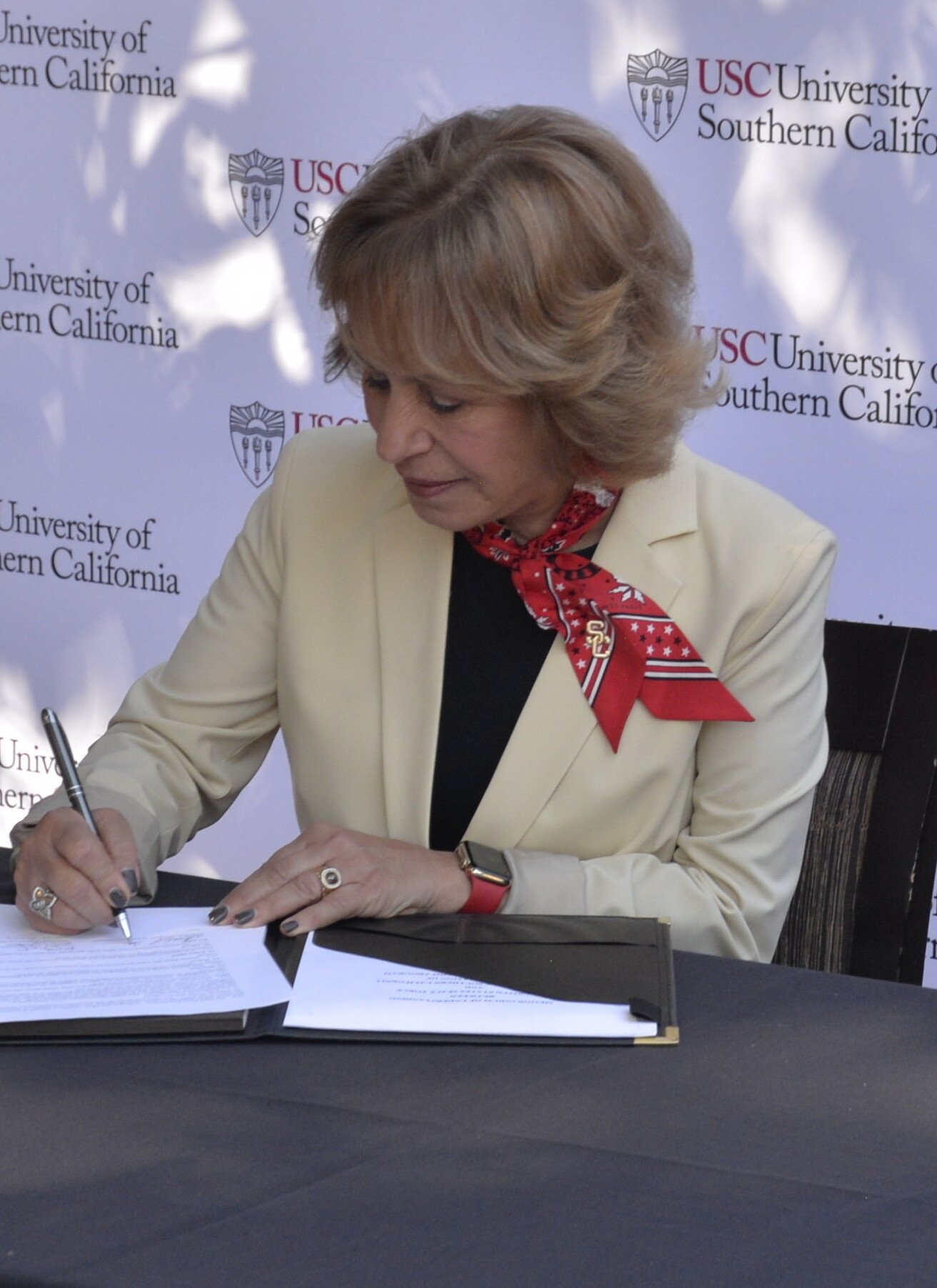
- Folt in 2022

12th President of the University of Southern California
- In office July 1, 2019 – June 30, 2025
- Preceded by: C. L. Max Nikias
- Succeeded by: Beong-Soo Kim (interim)

11th Chancellor of the University of North Carolina at Chapel Hill
- In office July 1, 2013 – January 31, 2019
- Preceded by: Holden Thorp
- Succeeded by: Kevin Guskiewicz

Acting President of Dartmouth College
- In office July 1, 2012 – June 9, 2013
- Preceded by: Jim Yong Kim
- Succeeded by: Philip J. Hanlon

Personal details
- Born: Carol Lynn Folt c. 1951 (age 74–75) Akron, Ohio, U.S.
- Spouse: David Peart
- Children: 2
- Education: University of California, Santa Barbara (BA, MA); University of California, Davis (PhD)
- Scientific career
- Fields: Biological sciences
- Institutions: Dartmouth College; University of North Carolina; University of Southern California
- Thesis: The effects of species interactions on the feeding and mortality of zooplankton (Tahoe) (1982)
- Doctoral advisor: Charles R. Goldman

Carol Lynn Folt (born 1951) is an American ecologist and academic administrator who served as the 12th president of the University of Southern California from July 2019 to June 2025. She previously served as the 11th chancellor of the University of North Carolina at Chapel Hill from 2013 to 2019 and as interim president of Dartmouth College from 2012 to 2013.

== Early life and education ==
A native of Akron, Ohio, Folt is the granddaughter of immigrants from Albania, from her mother's side.

Folt attended the University of California, Santa Barbara, receiving a Bachelor of Arts with a major in aquatic biology in 1976 and a Master of Arts in biology in 1978. She received a Doctor of Philosophy in ecology from the University of California, Davis in 1982. Her doctoral advisor was Charles Goldman. Folt completed postdoctoral studies at the Kellogg Biological Station of Michigan State University.

== Career ==
=== Dartmouth College ===
Folt joined Dartmouth College in 1983 as a research instructor in biological sciences and has conducted extensive research in metal toxicity. Since 2007, she has held an endowed professorship in biological sciences.

Folt joined Dartmouth's administration in 2001 when she was named dean of graduate studies and associate dean of the faculty. She became dean of the faculty in 2004. She was tapped as acting provost in 2009 and appointed provost in 2010. When Dartmouth president Jim Yong Kim was named as president of the World Bank in July 2012, Folt was named acting president.

=== University of North Carolina ===
On April 14, 2014, Folt was chosen as the 11th chancellor of the University of North Carolina at Chapel Hill by the board of governors of the University of North Carolina System, effective July 1, 2013. She succeeded Holden Thorp, who resigned from the position in June 2013 amid allegations of widespread academic fraud.

==== Academic-athletic scandal ====
Under Chancellor Folt's direction, UNC spent approximately 18 million dollars defending itself from NCAA sanctions for prolonged and widespread fraud within academic and athletics departments, the details of which were outlined in Wainstein Report. The Report summarizes the findings of an independent investigation conducted by former federal prosecutor Kenneth Wainstein. It describes abuses spanning over 18 years (during the tenures of Chancellor Michael Hooker, Chancellor James Moeser, Chancellor Holden Thorp), including "no-show" classes that had little to no faculty oversight. Approximately half of the enrollees in these "no-show" classes were athletes.

When the Wainstein Report was released in 2014, Folt acknowledged "It is just very clear that it was an academic issue with the way the courses were administered, and it is clearly an athletics issue." The Southern Association of Colleges and Schools, the regional accreditation body for UNC, took the nearly unprecedented step of placing UNC on a year of probation, wherein any further missteps would lead to the university's accreditation being removed, effectively dooming the entire university. Folt brought forth reforms on several levels, and the probation was consequently lifted with no further sanctions after a year.

While not nearly as important for the well-being of the university as a whole, UNC also faced the possibility of serious sanctions from the NCAA. Under Folt's leadership, the university later went on to deny that the academic fraud was specifically benefiting athletics in its defense to the NCAA, broadly attempting to insulate the UNC administration from the findings of the Wainstein Report and the allegations of UNC whistleblower Mary Willingham. One of the university's key assertions in its defense was that the NCAA did not have jurisdiction, since the university created and offered "no-show" courses not as part of a systemic effort to benefit athletes, but the student body in general. While citing the failure of multiple UNC administrators to cooperate with the investigation, the NCAA's Committee on Infractions did not hold UNC responsible, finding that "no-show" classes were not specifically designed to benefit athletes. This finding led both fans and media across the country to question "the integrity of the NCAA, suggesting that UNC's case would open the doors for other universities to set up similar no-show classes so long as non-athletes could enroll."

==== Silent Sam monument controversy ====
During her term as chancellor, Folt dealt with the controversy over the monument Silent Sam, which included demonstrators outside her office. Folt resigned as chancellor on January 14, 2019, effective end of the spring semester, stating: "There has been too much recent disruption due to the monument controversy". In the same letter, she ordered the remaining plinth (pedestal) to be removed, as a threat to campus safety. Later, the University of North Carolina system board of governors made her resignation effective January 31, 2019.

=== University of Southern California ===
Folt became president of USC on July 1, 2019. The University of Southern California's board of trustees appointed her. She was the unanimous choice by the search committee to usher in a new era for the university following a series of high-profile scandals.

In February 2020, Folt announced a plan to eliminate tuition for families earning $80,000 or less annually. Additionally, the university said it would no longer consider home equity in financial aid calculation.

As part of Folt's reform efforts, in March 2021 the university agreed to pay more than $1.1 billion to former patients of campus gynecologist George Tyndall who was accused of preying on a generation of USC women.

==== Anti-Zionist Tweet incident ====
In the summer of 2021, USC had a free speech quagmire over tweets posted by Yasmeen Mashayekh, a 21-year-old Palestinian civil engineering student whose statements included, "I Want to Kill Every Motherfucking Zionist". On December 1, 2021, 60 faculty members sent the latest in a series of letters to USC President Carol Folt, Provost Charles Zukoski, and board of trustees' chair Rick Caruso, urging the school to publicly rebuke Mashayekh and take action "to distance USC from her hateful statements."

==== Honoring Nisei Students ====
In April 2022, President Folt awarded honorary degrees posthumously to 33 Japanese-American students who saw their USC educations derailed during World War II when USC, unlike other universities, refused to let its Nisei students return to study and denied them their rightful transcripts. Folt also dedicated a rock garden on the USC campus to honor the university’s Nisei students.

==== Renaming center for public affairs ====
In June 2020, Folt announced the university was stripping the name of former USC President Rufus Von KleinSmid - an active supporter of the eugenics movement - from its international center for public affairs. In April 2022, Folt decided to rename the building in honor of Joseph Medicine Crow, a Native American alumnus and World War II war hero.

==== Renaming track stadium field ====
In 2023, Folt led the renaming of the field at the track stadium, Katherine B. Loker Stadium, at USC. The field had formerly been named Cromwell Field in honor of Dean Cromwell. Under Folt, USC renamed the field in honor of Allyson Felix.

==== Cancellation of Valedictorian Speech and Commencement Speakers ====
In April 2024, Folt and her administration were met with widespread controversy following her decision to restrict valedictorian Asna Tabassum from speaking during that year's commencement ceremony. USC cited safety concerns stemming from Tabassum's pro-Palestinian viewpoints. In regards to the cancellation of Tabassum's commencement speech, Folt stated that it would be "very hard" to guarantee Tabassum's safety, believing that the cancellation was a way to be "better prepared." Following several on-campus protests, statements from dozens of human rights organizations, and national coverage, USC further restricted all external speakers from speaking at that year's commencement.

The following week, USC became embroiled in additional controversy following a pro-Palestinian protest demanding USC divestment from Israeli interests, which took place in a central plaza of campus. After involved students refused to disperse despite demands from campus police, the university brought the Los Angeles Police Department in to remove protestors. The situation escalated to involve the complete closure of all campus facilities, the campus itself, and the arrests of 93 protestors. Folt, along with provost Andrew Guzman, were censured by USC's Academic Senate for their handling of the protest.

On April 25, 2024, Folt announced that the campus commencement ceremony in May would not take place.

==== Announced retirement ====
On November 8, 2024, Folt announced plans to retire at the end of the 2024–2025 school year and remain on the faculty of the University of Southern California. In February 2025, the USC Board of Trustees announced that the university's general counsel Beong-Soo Kim would succeed Folt as interim president starting on July 1, 2025.

== Personal life ==
Folt is married to Dartmouth professor David Peart; they have two children.
