= Beverly Wendland =

American scientist

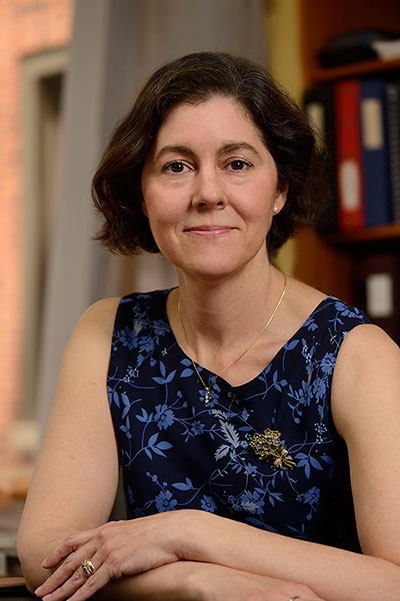

Provost and Vice President for Academic Affairs, West Virginia University
- Incumbent
- Assumed office July 1, 2026
- Preceded by: Paul Kreider (interim)

Provost and Executive Vice Chancellor for Academic Affairs, Washington University in St. Louis
- In office July 1, 2020 – July 31, 2025
- Preceded by: Holden Thorp
- Succeeded by: Mark D. West

Dean of the Krieger School of Arts and Sciences, Johns Hopkins University
- In office February 12, 2015 – June 30, 2020

Personal details
- Education: University of California, San Diego (BS); Stanford University (PhD)

Beverly Wendland is the provost and vice president for academic affairs at West Virginia University, Morgantown.

In her research career, Wendland's laboratory investigated the molecular mechanisms and regulation of endocytic vesicle formation, using cell biology, genetic, and structural biology approaches. Wendland's research has successfully taken advantage of the highly genetically tractable eukaryote, the yeast Saccharomyces cerevisiae. Her research in yeast has advanced the molecular understanding of the cell biology underlying human cancer, cardiovascular disease, lysosomal-storage disorders and infections.

== Education ==
Wendland received a Bachelor of Science with a major in bioengineering from the University of California, San Diego, in 1986 and a Ph.D. in neuroscience from Stanford University in 1993. She then conducted postdoctoral research with Scott Emr at the University of California, San Diego.

== Career ==
=== Johns Hopkins University ===
In 1998, Wendland joined the faculty of the Department of Biology at Johns Hopkins University. During her time at Johns Hopkins, she received both the 1999 Burroughs Wellcome Fund's New Investigator Award in the Pharmacological Sciences and the March of Dimes Basil O'Connor Starter Scholar Research Award. She also received a joint appointment in the Department of Biophysics. In 2009, Wendland was named chair of the Department of Biology.

On May 16, 2014, Wendland was selected to be interim dean of the Krieger School of Arts and Sciences after then-dean Katherine Newman announced she was accepting another position at the University of Massachusetts Amherst.

On February 12, 2015, Wendland was appointed dean of the Krieger School of Arts and Sciences. She was recommended by Johns Hopkins President Ronald Daniels and then-Provost Robert Lieberman, and approved by the Johns Hopkins Board of Trustees. Later that year, Wendland was elected a fellow of the American Association for the Advancement of Science (AAAS).

As dean, Wendland raised $747 million for the Krieger School of Arts and Sciences and helped establish the SNF Agora Institute, which seeks to strengthen global democracy. Wendland also focused on personalizing the undergraduate student experience with the introduction of active learning techniques, small seminar courses, and additional research opportunities. Wendland has been credited with increasing the diversity of faculty and creating a more inclusive climate in the Krieger School of Arts and Sciences.

=== Washington University in St. Louis ===
On January 14, 2020, Wendland was named as the new Provost of Washington University in St. Louis, effective July 1, 2020. She concluded her term on July 31, 2025.

=== West Virginia University ===
On January 8, 2026, Wendland was named as the new Provost of West Virginia University, effective July 1, 2026..
