= Curtis J. Milhaupt =

Professor of comparative law

Curtis J. Milhaupt is an American legal scholar and professor, known for his work in corporate law, international business law, and the comparative study of legal systems. He is a professor at Stanford Law School and has made significant contributions to the field of law, particularly in relation to the intersection of law and economics.

== Education ==
Milhaupt holds a B.A., University of Notre Dame 1984. He furthered his studies with advanced research in international law and economics, leading to his deep involvement in the study of legal systems across different jurisdictions.

== Academic career ==
Milhaupt began his academic career after completing his education, becoming a faculty member of Washington University in St. Louis, where he held the position of Professor of Law from 1994–1998 and at Columbia University, where he held the position of Director, Center for Japanese Legal Studies, 1999–2017. He has taught and researched various aspects of corporate law, comparative law, and the economic implications of legal rules in different national contexts. His academic work has focused on the legal dimensions of global business, the role of law in economic development, and the relationship between law and corporate governance.

== College and University positions ==
- Professor of Law, Stanford Law School, January, 2018–present
- Director, Center for Japanese Legal Studies, Columbia Law School, 1999–2017.
- Appointed the 2008 Albert E. Cinelli Enterprise Professor of Law in recognition of his innovative teaching in the field of business law at Columbia Law School.
- Erasmus Mundus Fellow in Law and Economics at the University of Bologna, appointed by the European Commission, Summer 2008.
- Paul Hastings Visiting Professor in Corporate and Financial Law at The University of Hong Kong, May 2007.
- Visiting Professor of Law at Tsinghua University in Beijing, Fall 2006.
- Research Fellow at the Research Institute of Economy, Trade and Industry, Tokyo, Fall 2002.
- Professor of Law, Washington University School of Law, 1994–1999.
