= Holden Thorp =

American chemist and university president

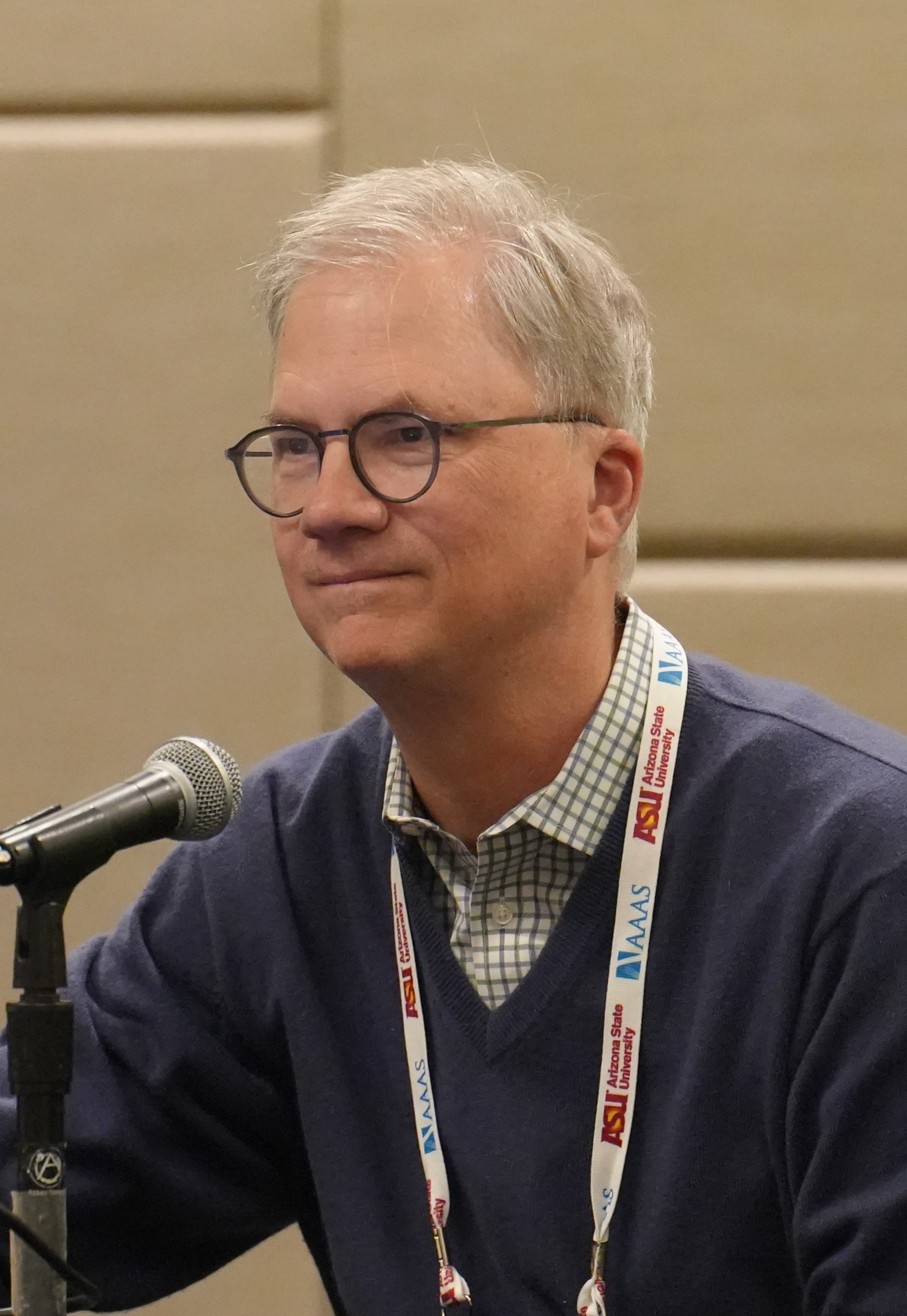
- Thorp in 2026

Provost of Washington University in St. Louis
- In office July 1, 2013 – July 15, 2019
- Preceded by: Edward S. Macias
- Succeeded by: Beverly Wendland

10th Chancellor of the University of North Carolina at Chapel Hill
- In office July 1, 2008 – June 30, 2013
- Preceded by: James Moeser
- Succeeded by: Carol Folt

Personal details
- Born: Herbert Holden Thorp; August 16, 1964 (age 62) Fayetteville, North Carolina, U.S.
- Education: University of North Carolina at Chapel Hill (BS); California Institute of Technology (PhD)
- Profession: College administrator, chemist
- Website: chemistry.columbian.gwu.edu/holden-thorp

Herbert Holden Thorp (born August 16, 1964) is an American chemist, professor and entrepreneur. He was the tenth chancellor of the University of North Carolina at Chapel Hill, assuming the position on July 1, 2008, succeeding James Moeser, and, at age 43, was noted as being among the youngest leaders of a university in the United States. At the time of his selection as chancellor, Thorp was the dean of the College of Arts and Sciences and a Kenan Professor of chemistry at the university.

In September 2012, amid allegations of academic fraud within a university department, Thorp announced his intention to resign the University of North Carolina presidency and return to teaching. Shortly thereafter, in February 2013, he announced his decision to leave the university to take up the job of provost at Washington University in St. Louis. He took over as provost on July 1, 2013, replacing Edward Macias. Thorp stepped down as the provost of Washington University in St. Louis on July 15, 2019.

On August 19, 2019, Thorp was announced as the new editor-in-chief of Science magazine. He continues to hold the Rita Levi-Montalcini Distinguished University Professorship of Chemistry in the Arts and Sciences and the School of Medicine at Washington University.

In 2023, he became a Professor of Chemistry at George Washington University.

== Early life and education ==
Thorp's father, Herbert Holden "Herb" Thorp (d. 1996), was a native of Rocky Mount, North Carolina. He was an attorney who earned an undergraduate degree from UNC in 1954 and a law degree, also from UNC, in 1956. His mother, Olga "Bo" Thorp (née Bernardin, 1933—2022), a 1956 UNC graduate, was a native of Columbia, South Carolina. Her parents were Italian immigrants who died when she was 15. Both of Thorp's parents were involved in creating Fayetteville Little Theater, now known as the Cape Fear Regional Theater, in 1962. Herb Thorp was its first president, and Bo Thorp was its creative director for 50 years until stepping down in April 2012.

Thorp's parents moved to Fayetteville, North Carolina, in 1960 and Thorp was born there on August 16, 1964. He spent much of his youth involved with the theater, performing in productions led by his mother, and met his future wife, Patti Worden, in 1974 at the theater. He attended St. Patrick Catholic School, a private middle school.

In summer 1981, at age 17, while studying guitar at Berklee College of Music in Boston, Thorp won first place and a $500 prize in a northeast regional competition to solve a Rubik's Cube puzzle. His motivation for entering the competition was to earn money to buy jazz records. Winning the competition also earned him a trip to the national competition, which was shown on the television program That's Incredible!. He came fifth in the national competition and won first place again in a regional competition the following year, in Charlotte, North Carolina.

After graduating from Terry Sanford High School in 1982, Thorp attended the only university he had applied to, the University of North Carolina. He was a pre-medical student initially, and later turned to chemistry and academia, earning a B.S. degree in 1986. He completed doctoral work in three years instead of the normal five at the California Institute of Technology in 1989, earning a Ph.D. under Harry B. Gray at the age of 24. He completed post-doctoral work with Gary Brudvig at Yale University in 1990.

In 1991, Thorp began teaching as an associate professor of chemistry at North Carolina State University.

== Research and entrepreneurship ==
Thorp was awarded a Presidential Young Investigator Award in 1991 by the National Science Foundation, which provided $100,000 of research funding annually for five years. Later that year, he was one of 20 people awarded a grant by the David and Lucile Packard Foundation; the $500,000 fellowship was for research on compounds used in genetic therapy. Both grants were for research to develop cancer and AIDS drugs as alternatives to chemotherapy.

In 1996, Thorp co-founded the biotechnology company Alderaan Diagnostics, later renamed Xanthon, Inc., to commercialize a technology he co-developed. The technology involved using electricity to test compounds that could later become new drugs. It was intended to turn a process that previously took months into an electronic process that would instead take hours. In 2001, Thorp was recognized by Fortune Small Business as a Small Business Innovator for the work that led to the founding of the company. Xanthon raised several rounds of venture capital, totaling $25 million, before closing in 2002, after technical glitches had delayed release of its commercial product and it could not find further funding.

In 2005, Thorp co-founded Viamet Pharmaceuticals, another biotechnology company, to develop treatments for cancer and other diseases. It raised $4 million in venture capital funding in 2007, and an additional $18 million in 2009. He is no longer involved in the operation of the company.

Thorp is a member of the scientific advisory board of Ohmx, a biotechnology firm based on technology developed by his doctoral mentor, Harry B. Gray. He was previously a venture partner at Hatteras Venture Partners, co-founded by his brother Clay. He gave up that role after being named chancellor of UNC in 2008, and his equity stake in the firm was transferred to a blind trust.

Thorp is a member of the UNC Lineberger Comprehensive Cancer Center.

== University of North Carolina ==
Thorp returned to his alma mater in 1993 to teach, rising from visiting assistant professor to professor in six years. In 1998, he received a Tanner Award for Excellence in Undergraduate Teaching.

In 2001, Thorp became the director of the Morehead Planetarium and Science Center, part of UNC. That fall, he co-led a student focus group responsible for exploring and providing feedback on the university's consideration of a branch campus of the UNC Kenan–Flagler Business School in Qatar. In 2005, he was named a Kenan Professor and chair of the chemistry department of the College of Arts and Sciences. He led the 2005 committee that selected the book as recommended reading for that fall's incoming freshmen, Blood Done Sign My Name: A True Story, by a North Carolina native Timothy Tyson.

He became the dean of the College of Arts and Sciences in 2007, after a nationwide search. A year later, he was named chancellor of the University after being nominated by Erskine Bowles, president of the University of North Carolina system, and unanimously chosen by the Board of Governors.

In 2013, Thorp resigned from the position of chancellor amid allegations of widespread academic fraud, which were later outlined in the Wainstein Report. The Wainstein Report describes the findings of an independent investigation conducted by the former federal prosecutor Kenneth Wainstein. It describes abuses spanning over 18 years, which included "no-show" classes that had little to no faculty oversight. Approximately half of those enrolled in these classes were athletes.

== Music ==
Beginning with his first theater appearance at age 3 in Carnival!, Thorp has been involved with many aspects of performance. He worked in lighting for productions at the theater company directed by his mother and later took on the music. He took piano and guitar lessons and formed a garage band as a teenager. While doing post-doctoral work, he wrote some music for the Yale Cabaret and a musical production for the River Renaissance on the Cape Fear River. He has written several musicals and has played piano with his local church. He has also played with Equinox, a local jazz band.

In 1998, Thorp was the musical director for a performance of The Sound of Music, in which his wife played Maria von Trapp, and as a result, missed the ceremony at which the Tanner award recipients were recognized.

== Awards and publications ==
Thorp was named a Distinguished Young Alumnus in 2002 by the UNC General Alumni Association.

In 2010, Thorp and Buck Goldstein wrote a book on entrepreneurship called Engines of Innovation, in which they insist that the world's biggest problems can be solved through innovation at large research universities. They also created a website to encourage innovation on college campuses.

== Personal life ==
Thorp has been married to Patti Worden since 1991. They have two children.

In 2024 Thorp revealed he has autism, using the announcement to make the case that the scientific community can benefit from better recognition and nurturing of individuals with the condition.
