= Ramseyer =

Ramseyer may refer to:

- André Ramseyer (1914–2007), Swiss sculptor
- Bill Ramseyer (1936–2021), United States football coach
- Christian William Ramseyer (1875–1943), politician from the US state of Iowa
- David Ramseyer (born 1987), Swiss-French basketball player
- Fritz Ramseyer (1840–1914), Basel missionary in Asante
- John Mark Ramseyer (1953–), professor of Japanese Legal Studies at Harvard Law School
- Rudolf Ramseyer (1897–1943), Swiss footballer

== See also ==
- Ramseyer+Jenzer, a Swiss manufacturing company
- Ramseier
- Ramseyer Memorial Presbyterian Church
