= William Grimes (former slave) =

African-American barber and writer (c. 1784–1865)

- Born: c. 1784; King George County, Virginia
- Died: August 20, 1865 (about 81); New Haven, Connecticut
- Resting place: Grove Street Cemetery, New Haven, Connecticut
- Occupations: Barber, American publisher
- Spouse: Clarissa Caesar Grimes
- Writing career
- Notable works: Life of William Grimes, the Runaway Slave (1825) and (1855)

William Grimes (c. 1784 – August 20, 1865) was an African American barber and writer who authored what is considered the first narrative of a formerly enslaved American, Life of William Grimes, the Runaway Slave, published in 1825, with a second edition published in 1855. Another revised edition was published by one of his descendants in 2008. Grimes escaped slavery by boarding on a ship called Casket, which sailed from Savannah, Georgia to New York City. He then walked to Connecticut from New York City to begin his life as a free man. Grimes lived in Stratford, Norwalk, Fairfield, Bridgeport and Stratford Point alongside New Haven and Litchfield, Connecticut following his escape from slavery. New Haven was where Grimes eventually settled to live out his final days.

== Biography ==
Grimes was born into slavery in King George County, Virginia, in 1784. His father was Benjamin Grymes Jr., a wealthy plantation owner; Grimes' mother was a slave on a neighboring plantation. Benjamin Grymes Jr., the father of William Grimes was the great-grandson of William Fitzhugh. Fitzhugh was the founder of Eagles's Nest plantation located in King George County, Virginia. Benjamin Grymes Jr., volunteered for Grayson's Continental Line Regiment in the American Revolutionary army and eventually received the rank of Lieutenant in 1777.

Grimes was enslaved by at least ten different enslavers in Virginia, Maryland, and Georgia. He worked as a house servant, valet, field worker, stable boy, and coachman. In 1815, at the age of 30, Grimes escaped from slavery by stowing away on the ship Casket that sailed from Savannah, Georgia to New York City. He then travelled by foot from New York City to New Haven, Connecticut.

Grimes settled in New Haven, Connecticut, where he was a successful barber. His clients included students from nearby Yale University and Litchfield. Grimes married Clarissa Caesar in 1817 in New Haven by Reverend Samuel Merwin. They had eighteen children together, but only twelve survived until adulthood.

The 1820 United States census indicates that Grimes was the head of a seven-member household in Litchfield. Following this, Grimes rented his barbershop in Litchfield and moved to New Haven where he worked as a barber, grocer, and furniture merchant. It is noted that Grimes lived in many cities in Connecticut. These cities being Stratford, Norwalk, Fairfield, Bridgeport and Stratford Point alongside New Haven and Litchfield.

In 1823, Grimes' last enslaver tracked him down and demanded that he pay for his freedom. His former enslaver would have him arrested and forced back into slavery if Grimes were to refuse.

After living four years in Litchfield, Grimes moved back to New Haven. Where he lived the rest of his years. Clarissa Caesar, his wife, then left for California because she and Grimes split some time before writing his second edition. Grimes gives no information as to why this occurred. However, he mentions that only his youngest child is still with him at that time and does not know where any other child of his is.

Grimes was still listed as living in New Haven in the 1830 and 1840 United States census.

In the 1860 United States census, William Grimes was listed as the head of an eight-person household in New Haven, while his occupation is shown as a lottery dealer.

== Purchasing of Freedom in Litchfield ==
Grimes became a known figure in Litchfield and New Haven, Connecticut while living there. Through his multiple jobs of barbering, furniture trading, and errand running for students, he was able to network with students, faculty, and politicians in the communities. This connection with members of each community caused Grimes' recent enslaver to learn where Grimes was. Feeling that the community of Litchfield was smaller and the political landscape would be more in his favor if his recent enslaver came looking for him, Grimes moved to Litchfield.

In 1823, Francis Harvey Welman, Grimes' last enslaver, tracked him down and demanded Grimes must pay for his freedom with "my house and land, all I had," or else face arrest and re-enslavement. The following year, in April 1824, Grimes officially purchased his freedom for 500 dollars. Grimes had to mortgage his property and take on debt to pay for his freedom. However, the people with whom he was connected and friends in Litchfield were able to help him with his negotiation of the price for his freedom. Grimes had no choice but to pay and wrote his memoir in hopes of recovering his finances. Grimes fled New Haven to live in Litchfield, Connecticut due to his former enslaver tracking him down.

== Family ==
A great-great-great-granddaughter of Grimes, Regina Mason, was an editor of the 2008 edition of Grimes' book. Mason talked about her ancestor's life in an interview with Terry Gross on the Fresh Air radio program on January 18, 2016. A 2017 film by Sean Durant entitled Gina's Journey: The Search for William Grimes documents her experiences tracking down information about Grimes over fifteen years. It includes reenactments of scenes from both Mason's and Grimes's lives with narration by Keith David.

== Death ==
Grimes died on August 20, 1865, about 81 years old, in New Haven, Connecticut. On his death, his obituary was published as far away as Brooklyn, New York. He was then laid to rest in Grove Street Cemetery, located near Yale University. Clarissa Caesar Grimes, his wife, died on December 15 in San Francisco. Following this, she was laid to rest in New Haven with her husband.

== Slave narratives ==
=== Life of William Grimes, the runaway slave ===
William Grimes published his first slave narrative, Life of William Grimes, the runaway slave, in 1825 to recover finances. His slave narrative provides great detail of his life until 1825. This slave narrative was published only months after he purchased his freedom. Grimes mailed a copy of his narrative to President John Quincy Adams, who had it bound and preserved among his papers, though it is unknown whether he read it.

An updated version of the autobiography was published in 1855. Because the first edition of Grimes' slave narrative was an early example of the genre published in the United States, he felt that a second edition would likely reap additional monetary gains, as autobiographical accounts of slavery had become more popular in subsequent decades. The second edition provides an update of his life until 1855 while also counterbalancing the bitterness put forth in his first slave narrative. However, his second release of a slave narrative did receive a much different reception from the first. The abolitionist press at the time did not reference the second edition in any newspapers.

== See also ==
- Fugitive slaves in the United States
- Slave narrative
