= St. John Fisher University =

Private university in Pittsford, New York, US

Coordinates: 43°06′58″N 77°30′42″W

- Former name: St. John Fisher College (1948–2022)
- Motto: "Teach me goodness, discipline, and knowledge"
- Type: Private university
- Established: 1948; 78 years ago
- Endowment: $158.3 million (2025)
- President: Gerard Rooney
- Undergraduates: 2,700
- Postgraduates: 1,000
- Location: Rochester, New York, United States
- Campus: Suburban, 154 acres (0.62 km^{2})
- Athletics: 28 varsity teams
- Colors: (Cardinal red and gold)
- Nickname: Cardinals
- Mascot: Beaks The Cardinal
- Website: sjf.edu
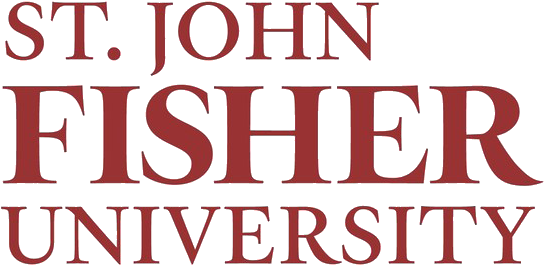

St. John Fisher University is a private university in Rochester, New York. It is named after John Fisher, an English Catholic cardinal and saint. It was named St. John Fisher College until July 1, 2022.

== History ==
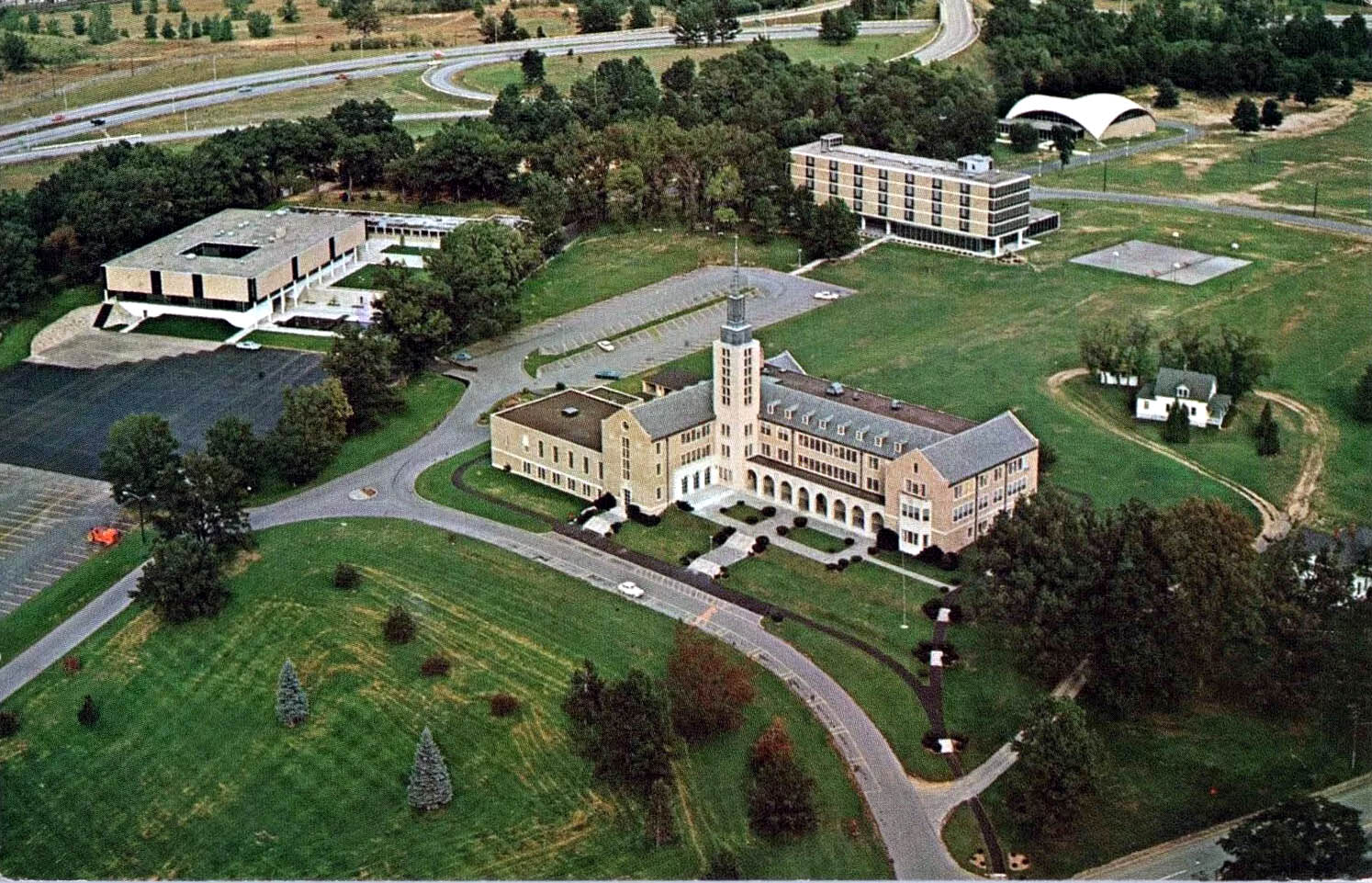
Aerial view of the SJFC campus in 1973

St. John Fisher University (originally St. John Fisher College) was founded as a men's college in 1948 by the Basilian Fathers and with the aid of James E. Kearney, then the Bishop of the Diocese of Rochester. It is now operated as a coeducational independent institution in the Catholic tradition, although it is no longer a Catholic university. It has been independent since 1968 and coeducational since 1971.

In 2025, St. John Fisher University reapplied for and again received the Carnegie Community Engagement Classification from the Carnegie Foundation for the Advancement of Teaching and the New England Resource Center for Higher Education (NERCHE).

The college was listed as a census-designated place in 2020, with a residential population of 1,307. In 2022, the college was renamed St. John Fisher University.

== Academics ==
Academic rankings

National
- U.S. News & World Report: 142
- Washington Monthly: 147

Fisher is made up of five schools. It offers more than 40 undergraduate majors, as well as a variety of master's and doctoral programs.

=== School of Arts and Sciences ===
The School of Arts and Sciences is the largest school within St. John Fisher University. It offers degrees and minors in over 20 undergraduate academic disciplines.

=== Ralph C. Wilson, Jr. School of Education ===
The school is named after Ralph C. Wilson, Jr., the founding owner of the Buffalo Bills professional football team. It is accredited by the National Council for Accreditation of Teacher Education and offers undergraduate degrees in Inclusive Adolescence Education and Inclusive Childhood Education. It also offers a master's degree and initial certification program for those areas. Teachers already holding initial certification can earn graduate degrees and professional certification in Literacy Education (B-6 and 5–12), Library Media, and Educational Leadership, as well as an accelerated Doctor of Education in Executive Leadership.

The School of Education is active in community outreach programs including a literacy center that provides tutoring and small group instruction in literacy for elementary through high school students. The School of Education works closely with local school districts including the Rochester City School District, which hosts a number of Professional Development Sites where practicing teachers and pre-service teachers work alongside education faculty to develop best practices.

=== School of Business ===
Fisher's business programs are accredited by the Association to Advance Collegiate Schools of Business (AACSB International). When this accreditation was gained, all business programs at the University were brought together in 2003 to form the school's first professional school, the School of Business.

=== Wegmans School of Pharmacy ===
The Wegmans School of Pharmacy is one of eight pharmacy schools in New York State and is the first pharmacy school in the Greater Rochester community. It opened in fall 2006 and became fully accredited in May 2010. It awards a Doctor of Pharmacy degree to candidates who successfully complete four years of professional study.

The school was made possible by a $5 million gift from the late Robert Wegman, who served for many years as president of Wegmans Food Markets.

=== Wegmans School of Nursing ===
This school is also named after Robert Wegman, who contributed $8 million to the college to create the School of Nursing. Fisher's nursing programs are fully accredited by the New York State Education Department and the Commission on Collegiate Nursing Education.

The university also offers an online RN to BSN program, master's degrees in both Nursing and Mental Health Counseling, and Certified Registered Nurse Anesthetist (CRNA) and Doctor of Nursing Practice (DNP) programs.

== Athletics ==
St. John Fisher Cardinals
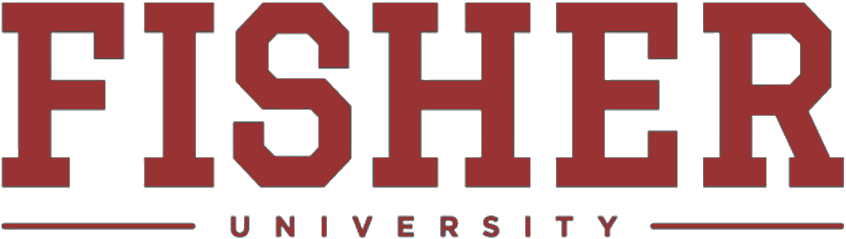
- University: St. John Fisher University
- Nickname: Cardinals
- NCAA: Division III
- Conference: Empire 8 (primary); Eastern College Athletic Conference (select sports); Liberty League (women's rowing); United Volleyball Conference (men's volleyball)
- Athletic director: Jen Granger
- Location: Rochester, New York
- Varsity teams: 28
- Football stadium: Growney Stadium
- Basketball arena: Manning & Napier Varsity Gymnasium
- Baseball stadium: Dugan Yard
- Colors: Cardinal Red and Gold
- Website: sjfathletics.com

The St. John Fisher athletic teams are called the Cardinals. The university is a founding member of the Empire 8 Athletic Association (a.k.a. Empire 8) and competes with other full member schools. It competes at the NCAA Division III ranks, and is also a member of the Eastern College Athletic Conference (ECAC), the Liberty League for women's rowing, and the United Volleyball Conference for men's volleyball. Its mascot is the cardinal.

During the 2014–15 season, St. John Fisher won Empire 8 championships for men's indoor track & field, men's basketball, women's basketball, men's outdoor track & field, men's golf, and women's lacrosse.

In 2006, Fisher's football team finished the season with a 12–2 record overall and shared the Empire 8 Conference title. Fisher received an at-large bid into the NCAA Division III Tournament, in which they defeated Union College, Springfield College, and Rowan University to reach the national semifinals, which they lost to Mount Union College, the defending national champions, by a score of 26–14.

In 2007, Fisher's men's basketball team won the Empire 8 Conference title for the 5th consecutive year and the 6th time in seven years. In 2006, Fisher advanced to the Elite Eight of the NCAA Men's Division III Basketball Championship Tournament.

The women's basketball program was led for 34 seasons by Phil Kahler, who posted a career record of 797 wins (the most in Division III history) and 175 losses with a career winning percentage of .821. Under Kahler, the women's basketball program reached the NCAA Division III Championship Tournament 14 times and played in the NCAA Women's Division III Basketball Championship game in 1988 and 1990. Kahler retired shortly before the start of the 2008–09 basketball season and was replaced on the bench by Marianne O'Connor Ermi, his top assistant coach for 20 seasons. The women's basketball team is now led by Melissa Kuberka who was hired as a head coach before the 2017–18 season.

Women's Flag Football will be added for the Spring 2027 season.

=== Venues ===
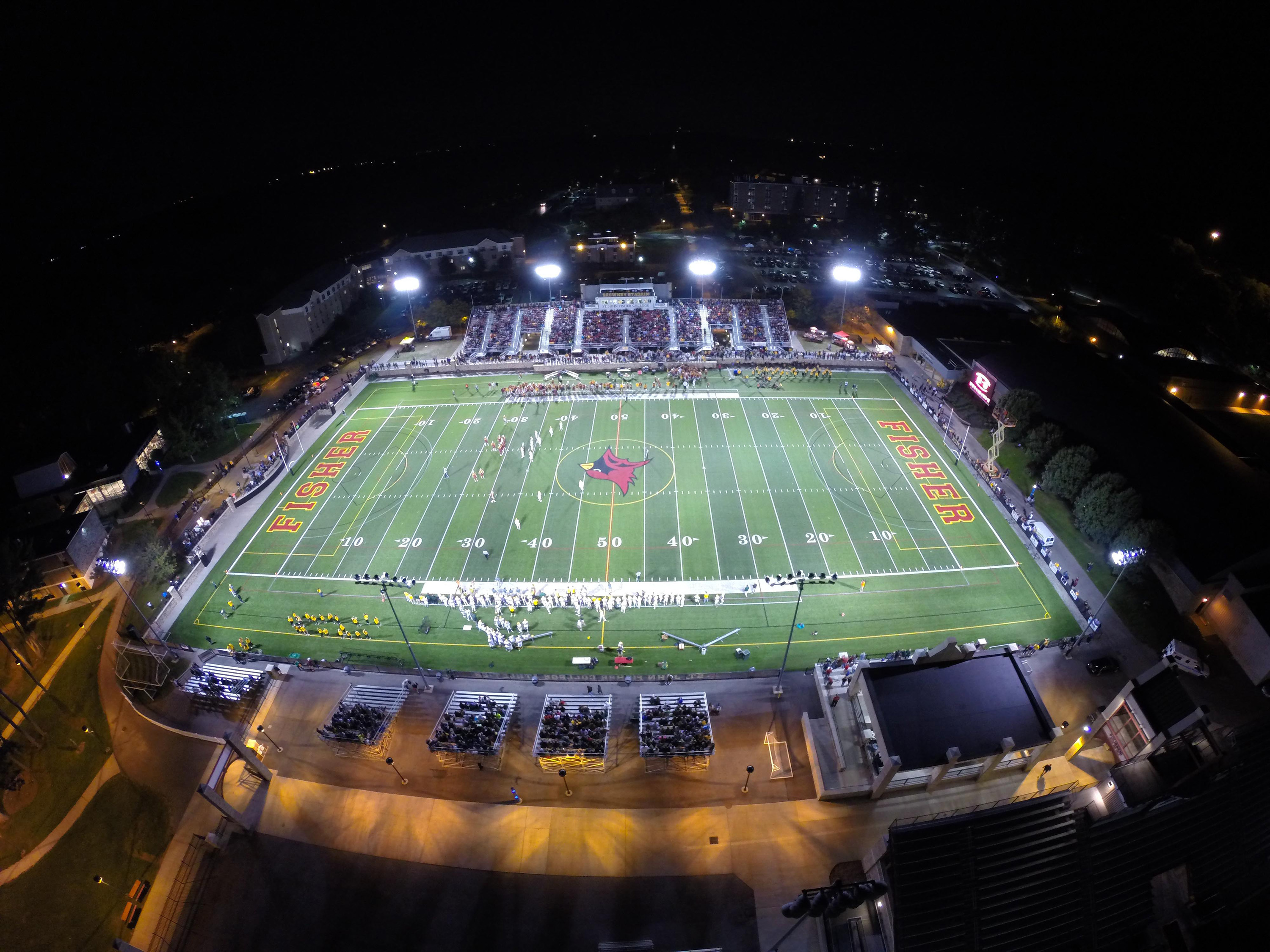
Growney Stadium, venue for various sports

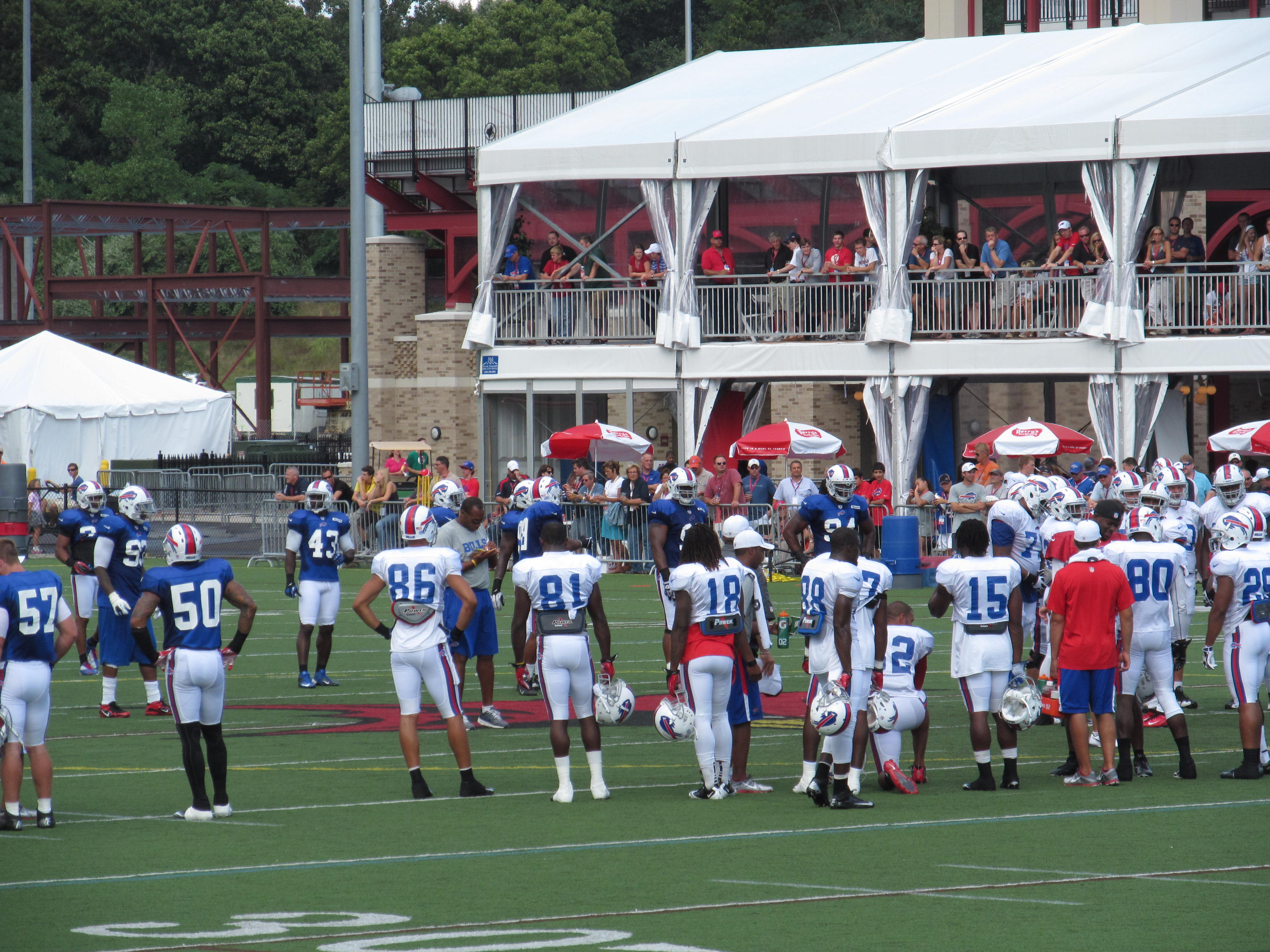
Buffalo Bills training camp at Fisher University in August 2012

Growney Stadium is home to Fisher's football, field hockey, soccer, and lacrosse teams. The stadium's all-weather playing field has lighting and a 2,500 seat grandstand. The Manning & Napier Varsity Gymnasium is home to the men's and women's basketball teams.

Dugan Yard is Fisher's baseball field. Other facilities include the Polisseni Track and Field Complex, the Joseph Pellicano Wrestling Pavilion, regulation-sized practice fields (which serve as the home rugby fields), and a softball diamond.

Training facilities include the Player Development Center at Dugan Yard, and Boyce Family Weight Room.

=== Buffalo Bills Training Camp ===
Since 2000, St. John Fisher University has been home to the Buffalo Bills' NFL summer training camp.

== Student life ==
Many campus clubs and organizations are available to students. Four of the major organizations on campus include the Student Government Association, the Student Activities Board, the Residence Hall Association, and Commuter Council.

Other clubs include music groups, Greek-lettered organizations, language clubs, cultural organizations, student publications, and intramural sports. Many academic departments also sponsor clubs. Fisher students can contribute to the community through a variety of service organizations including Teddi Dance for Love, Best Buddies, and numerous on- and off-campus service activities including Project Community Convergence, Relay for Life, the Giant Read, and the Sweetheart Ball.

The Office of Campus Ministry offers faith-based programs and activities to students of all faith traditions regardless of religious tradition or spiritual beliefs.

== Teddi Dance for Love ==
The Annual Teddi Dance for Love is a 24 hour dance marathon started by Lou Buttino in 1983 that benefits Camp Good Days and Special Times. This project funds a trip to Florida for the children of Camp Good Days and has raised over $2 million since its inception.

== Notable alumni ==
- Joseph L. Biehler, U.S. Army major general
- John Bolton, actor, best known for Anastasia on Broadway.
- Pandora Boxx, drag queen, and contestant on RuPaul's Drag Race (season 2), RuPaul's Drag Race All Stars (season 1), and RuPaul's Drag Race All Stars (season 6).
- Russ Brandon, sports executive, and current President of the XFL.
- Rich Christiano, film director, producer, and writer.
- Maria Cino, public servant and political operative of the Republican Party.
- Richard C. David, former mayor of Binghamton, New York.
- Mark C. Johns, former member of the New York State Assembly.
- Dan Kane, news reporter and investigative journalist for the Raleigh, North Carolina newspaper The News & Observer.
- David G. Larimer, Senior United States district judge of the United States District Court for the Western District of New York.
- Kathryn Nesbitt, soccer assistant referee.
- John "JR" Rickert, sports agent, chief operating officer of Authentic Athletix Sports Agency's East Coast Offices, and the owner of JR Sports Enterprises, principal of Niskayuna High School.
- Jamie Romeo, former member of the New York State Assembly, and current Monroe County Clerk.
- Edward W. Stack, billionaire businessman who was chairman and chief executive officer (CEO) of Dick's Sporting Goods from 1984 to 2021. Son of Dick's Sporting Goods founder Richard "Dick" Stack.

== See also ==
- Cardinal Courier, Fisher's student newspaper
