= Julius Nyang'oro =

Julius Nyang'oro (born 1954) is a writer, political scientist and legal scholar. He was the chairman of the Department of African and African-American Studies at the University of North Carolina at Chapel Hill for over ten years, before resigning in the wake of an academic fraud scandal in 2011.

== Early life and education ==
Nyang'oro was born in 1954. He attended the University of Dar es Salaam in Tanzania graduating with a BA in Political Science and International Relations. He earned a master's degree and PhD in Political Science from Miami University and a JD from Duke University.

== Career ==
Professor Nyang'oro spent most of his academic career at the University of North Carolina and has been a member in the Africanist community in the United States. His earlier academic writings were on Africa's political and economic underdevelopment.

His first book entitled The State and Capitalist Development in Africa was published in 1989.

Subsequently he published books on political development in Africa, notably on the question of civil society, with much of the work dealing with Eastern and Southern Africa.

He led the Department of African and African-American Studies at UNC Chapel Hill from its infancy as a curriculum to its status as a Department in 1996.

From 2002 to 2005 he was a Collaborating Researcher at the United Nations Research Institute for Social Development, where he worked on a project titled "Ethnic Structure, Inequality and Governance of the Public Sector".

Nyang’oro’s later work has concentrated on Tanzania. He wrote three books on the subject: JK: a Political Biography of Jakaya Mrisho Kikwete (2010), Politics and Public Policy in Tanzania (2016); and ESCROW: Politics and Energy in Tanzania (2016). These three books led to appearances as an expert commentator on Tanzanian politics on networks such as BBC, VOA and Deutsche Welle.

In more recent years, Nyang’oro has worked as an international consultant on matters related to African development and security.

== Academic fraud scandal ==
In 2011 during an investigation at the University of North Carolina at Chapel Hill into academic achievement by NCAA athletes, it was reported that there were classes which instructors did not teach, in which they falsified grade changes and faked faculty signatures on grade reports. According to the Chronicle of Higher Education, Nyang'oro "helped perpetuate the scheme and taught some of the phony classes". He resigned as department chair in 2011 and retired from the university in 2012. In 2013 Nyang'oro was charged with felony fraud in connection with these events, but the charge was eventually dropped due to his cooperation with the university's internal investigation.
