= History of the University of North Carolina at Chapel Hill =

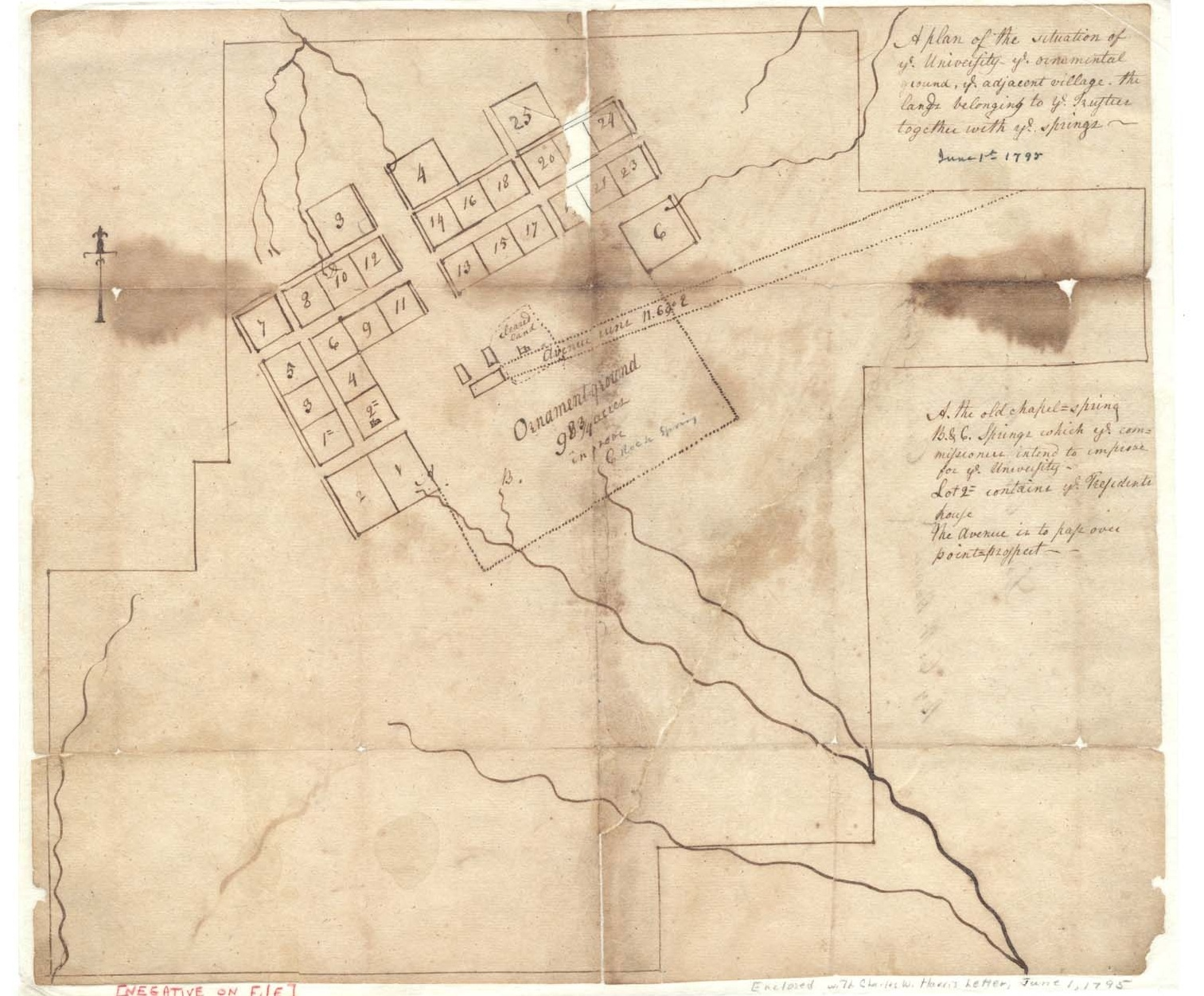
A Plan of the Situation of the University, the Ornamental Ground, the Adjacent Village, the Lands Belonging to the Trustees, Charles Wilson Harris, 1795. Early plan for the university.

The University of North Carolina at Chapel Hill is a coeducational public research university located in Chapel Hill, North Carolina, United States. It is one of three schools to claim the title of the oldest public university in the United States. The first public institution of higher education in North Carolina, the school opened on February 12, 1795.

Until the 1970s, the university was simply known as the University of North Carolina. After the other state universities were combined into a single public university system, called the University of North Carolina, the original institution was given the new name of University of North Carolina at Chapel Hill.

== Beginnings: Late 18th century ==
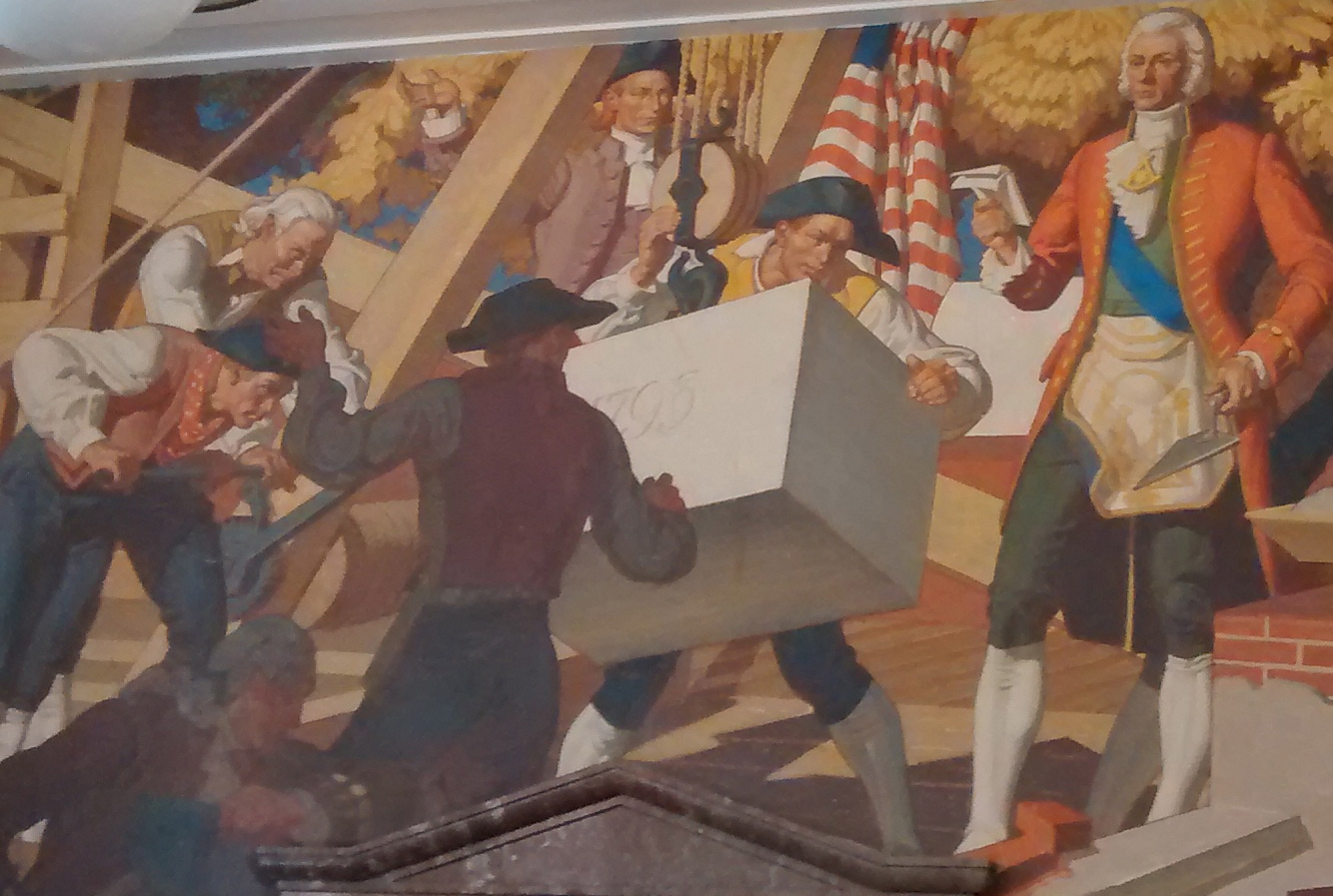
William Davie (at right wearing masonic apron) laying the cornerstone of Old East.

After the first constitution of the state of North Carolina was adopted in 1776 after the United States declared its independence from the Kingdom of Great Britain, work began to establish the independent state of North Carolina. Article 41 of North Carolina Constitution set forth to establish affordable schools and universities for the instruction of the young people in the state. Samuel Eusebius McCorkle made the first attempt to implement article 41. (He is remembered in the name McCorkle Place, on the UNC-CH campus.) In November 1784 he introduced a bill in the North Carolina General Assembly to establish a state university. The bill was rejected due to financial restraints and political turmoil.

Five years later, chartered by the North Carolina General Assembly on December 11, 1789, and beginning instruction in 1795, the University of North Carolina at Chapel Hill (then named simply the University of North Carolina) became the oldest public university in the nation, as measured by start of instruction as a public institution. The university was the first land grant school in North Carolina; however, shortly after they were stripped of their title for using funds in an improper manner. The College of William & Mary, chartered in 1693, and the University of Georgia, chartered in 1785, are both older as measured by date of charter. However, William & Mary was originally a private institution, and did not become a public university until 1906. Georgia has always been a public institution, but did not start classes until 1801. A political leader in revolutionary America, William Richardson Davie, led efforts to build legislative and financial support for the university.

The site of New Hope Chapel was chosen for "the purity of the water, the salubrity of the air and the great healthfulness of the climate", as well as its location at the center of the state, at the intersection of two major roads. David Ker, who conducted the local high school in Chapel Hill, was chosen as the first presiding professor of the university.

UNC course catalog from June, 1819

The university opened in a single building, which came to be called Old East. Still in use as a residence hall, it is the oldest building originally constructed for a public university in the United States. Davie, in full Masonic Ceremony as he was the Grand Master of the Grand Lodge of North Carolina at the time, laid the cornerstone on October 12, 1793, near an abandoned Anglican chapel which led to the naming of the town as Chapel Hill. The first student, Hinton James, from near Burgaw in what is now Pender County, arrived on February 12, 1795. While a student, James was among the students who broke off from the Debating Society (later renamed the Dialectic Society) to form the Concord Society (later renamed the Philanthropic Society). A dormitory on the UNC campus is named in his honor. It is currently the southernmost on-campus dormitory and houses primarily first-year students.

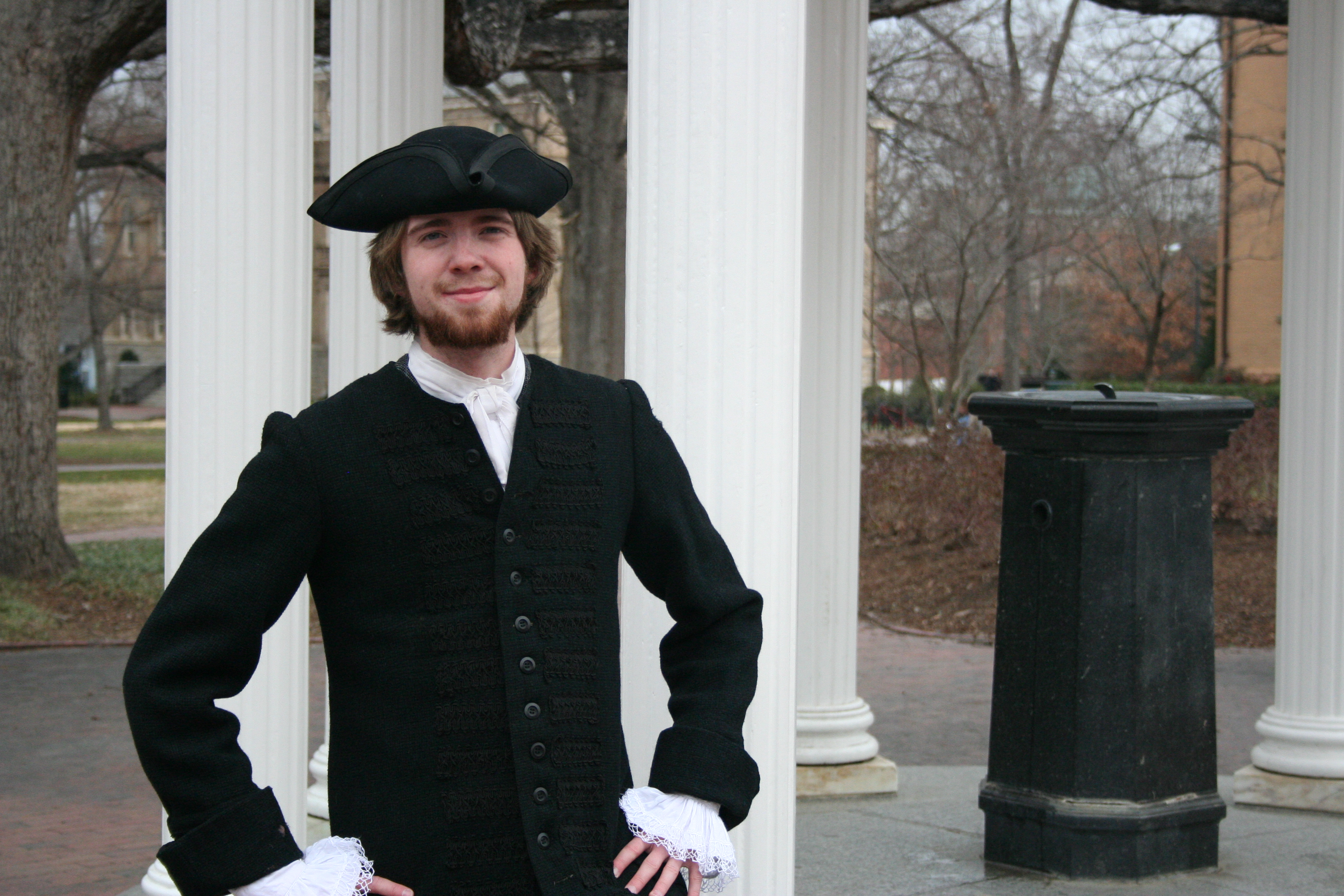
UNC student dressed as Hinton James

Another founding member of the Concord Society and its first president, David Gillespie, the son of U.S. congressman James Gillespie, was the first person granted a document in the form of a diploma from the university. He received the document in 1796 before he left to assist Andrew Ellicott with determining the boundary of the United States after the Treaty of San Lorenzo with Spain.

When the university opened there were 41 students, rising to 100 in the second term, with a faculty of five. Entering students, according to an 1819 publication, were expected to be able to read the Bible in Greek, and to have read Caesar's Commentarii de Bello Gallico (7 books), Virgil's Bucolics and Æneid, and Ovid in Latin, the latter in an "editio expurgata".

When it opened the university received no state financial support, as the charter made no provision for it. The school depended on donations of money and land, "but North Carolinians did not give these generously, feeling that the university was too expensive, too difficult to reach from all areas of the state, and that its liberal and skeptical teachings were insufficiently Christian".

=== Slavery and the birth of the university ===
"Members of the Board of Trustees were among the largest slave owners in the state."

In the summer of 1793, ...slaves began clearing land to build the first public university in the new nation. Black workers labored through the summer heat to clear a main street for the village of Chapel Hill and to construct the foundations of Old East, the first building at the University of North Carolina.

At a Southern university, "slaves made the bricks that went into buildings, they worked the grounds and buildings around the campus. They carried water, serviced the dormitories, worked in the dining halls."

== Growth and development: Early 19th century ==
The early 19th century saw a period of much growth and development with the help of the backing of the trustees. Through this growth, the university began to move away from its original purpose, to train leadership for the state, as it added to the curriculum, first starting with the typical classical trend. By 1815, the university started giving equal ground to the natural sciences, and in 1818 the Department of Chemistry was founded. This development continued with the establishment in 1831 of the first astronomical observatory at a state university in the United States.

Considerable information about university life in Chapel Hill in the antebellum period is provided by George Moses Horton, "the black bard of Chapel Hill" and the first North Carolinian to publish a book of literature. He delivered produce to the campus every week, and goaded by the students, he found he could speak in public and write poems; composing them at night, by memory since he could not write, he provided acrostics and similar light verse. The students, "the sons of wealthy planters", paid him 25¢ to 75¢ for these pieces, which they wrote out and sent to their girlfriends.

According to Horton, the students "seemed more interested in sports, gambling, and pleasures of the table than in their studies. They often engaged in boisterous riots and at various times destroyed laboratories, recitation rooms, and blackboards. They attacked faculty with clubs, stones, and pistols; sang ribald songs; violently rang the university bell; stole farmers' produce and animals; and perpetrated assorted vulgar and dangerous pranks." On the university's own posted history, we find that students hoisted pigs into dormitory rooms. "Cheating became a sport for many students, who transformed it into 'a trial of wit between the class and the Professor, and it was considered good fun to win.' They cut holes in classroom floors, put good students under them, and passed questions down by a string—what was called "working the telegraph." "By all accounts, university students, faculty, and servants drank steadily and heavily.... Even on the Sabbath."

Student behavior later reached the attention of the Trustees, who deplored "gross irregularities of conduct by students on the railroad cars, at circuses and other places". The students on one railroad car were "so boisterous" that it was unhitched, since it was the last car, and the train proceeded without them. A thrown "fireball" deliberately started a fire that destroyed the university's bell and belfry.

The first issue of a North Carolina University Magazine, literary in focus, was published by senior students in 1844. Describing the earlier venture as having been "starved out", No. 1 of a second North Carolina University Magazine appeared in February, 1852.

=== The Hedrick affair ===
During the lead-up to the 1856 United States presidential election, an attack was made in the press on an unidentified professor who allegedly supported anti-slavery candidate John C. Frémont, whose election, the Raleigh Standard opined, would inevitably lead to "a separation of the states". "Let our schools and seminaries of learning be scrutlnized; and if black Republicans [Frémont supporters] be found in them, let them be driven out. That man is neither a fit nor a safe instructor of our young men, who even inclines to Fremont and black Republicanism."

Following up on this, a lengthy letter to the editor soon appeared; signed only "Alumnus" (a student), the author was identified by university historian Kemp Battle as Joseph A. Engelhard.

[C]an the Trustees of our own State University invite pupils to the institution under their charge with the assurance that this main stream of education contains no deadly poison at its fountain head? ...[W]e have been reliably informed that a professor at our State University is an open and avowed supporter of Fremont, and declares his willingness—nay, his desire—to support the black Republican ticket. ...Is he a fit or safe instructor for our young men? ...[O]ught he not to be "required to leave," at least dismissed from a situation where his poisonous influence is so powerful, and his teachings so antagonist to the "honor and safety" of the University and the State? ....We must have certain security, under existing relations of North with South, that at State Universities at least we will have no canker-worm preying at the very vitals of Southern institutions.

In another lengthy letter, published by the author as a pamphlet after it appeared in the Standard, The pamphlet defending Hedrick contains neither date nor publisher, but it was obviously published by Hedrick in 1856. In addition to the letter of Hedrick and preliminary remarks, it concludes with an abolitionist speech at the University of North Carolina by Judge William Gaston. Professor Benjamin Hedrick, an honors graduate of the university, said that there was "little doubt" that he was the professor attacked. He quoted Thomas Jefferson as saying that "Nothing is more certainly written in the book of fate, than that these people are to be free". Citing as his "political teachers", besides Jefferson, fellow Southerners George Washington, Patrick Henry, James Madison, Edmund Randolph, Henry Clay, as well as Benjamin Franklin and Daniel Webster, "I cannot believe that slavery is preferable to freedom, or that slavery extension is one of the constitutional rights of the South." According to the newspaper when presenting his letter, "We take it for granted that Prof. Hedrick will be promptly removed." He was hung in effigy; faculty disowned him; parents threatened to withdraw their sons; and alumni joined the public in calling for his dismissal. He refused to resign and since "Mr. Hedrick had greatly, if not entirely, destroyed his power to be of further benefit to the University", he was terminated within a week, though his salary was paid through the end of the term. The only faculty member to defend him, French instructor Henry Harrisse, was terminated at the same time. Hounded by a mob, Hedrick left his native state.

== Civil War ==
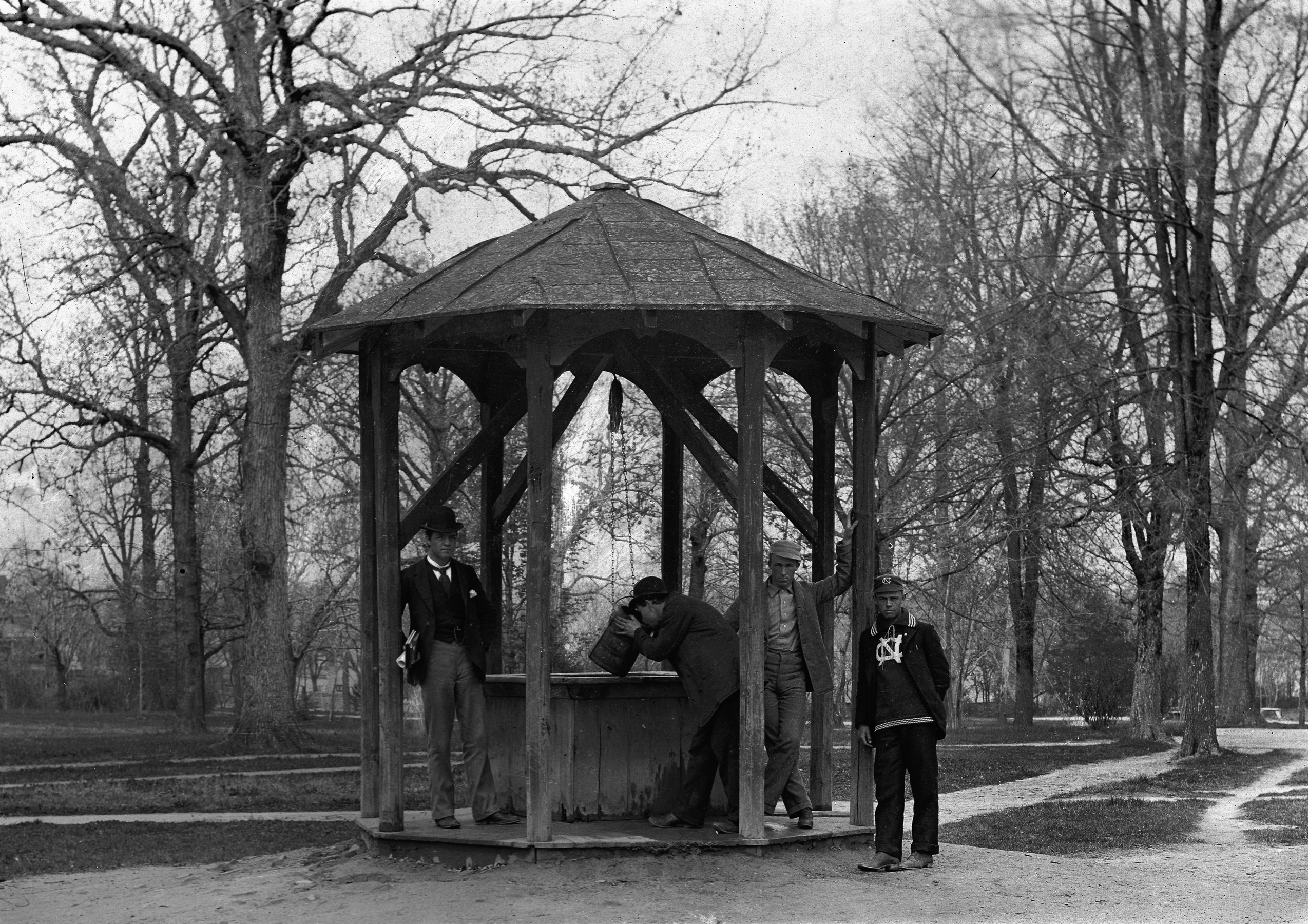
Original Old Well 1892

During the Civil War, the university was among the few in the Confederacy that managed to keep its doors open. Students from other seceding states left, as did many North Carolina students; by 1864, there were only 47 students. "The war ruined the University financially, so that by 1866, faculty salaries could not be paid; the University was $100,000 in debt; its buildings had deteriorated, and its entire endowment, [converted into Confederate money,] was lost through the insolvency of the Bank of North Carolina."

== Later 19th century ==
Under North Carolina's 1868 Constitution, the university's board of trustees would be appointed by the state board of education rather than the state's legislators. Historian James Leloudis argues that "this move was designed to wrest control of the campus from its ex-Confederate alumni and, in the words of Governor [William] Holden and his Republican allies, to broaden and democratize the University." The new board of trustees supported the coeducation of men and women, and endorsed plans for the establishment of a separate university branch for freedmen in Raleigh.

In 1868, Solomon Pool became the president of the university. He had previously denounced the university during the Civil War as "a nursery of treason" governed by "aristocracy and family influence." His administration's plans for reform were met with staunch resistance by Democratic newspapers. Additionally, enrollment was jeopardized by the Ku Klux Klan's campaign of terror, largely concentrated in the Piedmont region, which targeted white Republicans alongside Black people. Finally, the state Legislature refused to repudiate the university's debt – Democrats aspired to starve out the progressive administration while Republicans remained suspicious of the university's faculty. Due to a lack of students and funding, the university was forced to close in 1871.

Following an amendment to North Carolina's constitution that returned the power to appoint the board of trustees to the state legislature, lawmakers appointed a new board in 1874 consisting mostly of Democratic Party leaders. The Board instituted a new structure for the school, on the recommendation of a committee led by Kemp Battle, to "keep step with the century in its march of knowledge, invention and discovery." The new University consisted of six schools: Agriculture, Engineering and Mechanical Arts, Natural Science, Literature, Mathematics and Philosophy.

The university restored its prestige through growth and innovation, continuing to develop scientific programs. For example, it undertook a massive program to support farmers by conducting scientific analyses of fertilizers and their effectiveness in relation to different crops and soil types in North Carolina. It opened a normal school in 1877, which was both the first university summer school and the first normal school linked to a university in the United States. The university reopened its law school in 1877 and established schools of medicine in 1879 and of pharmacy in 1880.

== Consolidation: Early 20th century ==
In 1915, the mission of the university was broadened to include research and public service, culminating in the Association of American Universities admitting UNC as a member in 1922. This change lead to a large number of new professional schools in the coming years, including:

- School of Education (1915)
- School of Commerce, now Kenan-Flagler Business School (1919)
- School of Public Welfare, now the School of Social Work (1920)
- School of Library Science, now the School of Information and Library Science (1931)
- Institute of Government, now the School of Government (1931)
- School of Public Health, now the Gillings School of Global Public Health (1936)
- Division of Health Affairs (1949)
- School of Dentistry (1949)
- School of Journalism, now the School of Media and Journalism (1950)
- School of Nursing (1950)

In 1915, Cora Zeta Corpening became the first woman enrolled into the medical school.

In 1932, UNC became one of the three original campuses of the consolidated University of North Carolina (since 1972 called the University of North Carolina system). During the process of consolidation, programs were moved among the schools, which prevented competition. For instance, the engineering program at North Carolina State University in Raleigh became the designated engineering school within the consolidated university and UNC relinquished its engineering program.

In 1963, the consolidated university was made fully coeducational. As a result, the Woman's College of the University of North Carolina was renamed the University of North Carolina at Greensboro.

Until the second half of the 20th century, only white students were admitted.

== 21st century ==
On August 20, 2018, student protestors tore down the university's Confederate monument, known as Silent Sam. The pedestal (plinth) and plaques were removed shortly afterwards on instructions from then-Chancellor Carol Folt (who announced her resignation in the same letter). Although there has been much discussion about what to do with the monument, as of December 2020 it remains in storage. Additionally, the university's Carr Hall, which was named for former pro-white supremacy, KKK-supporting Confederate veteran Julian Shakespeare Carr, was renamed the "Student Affairs Building" in July 2020. Carr had previously served on the university's board of trustees.

On August 28, 2023, during the second week of the fall semester, a shooting occurred on the campus that resulted in the death of one faculty member.

== Bibliography ==
- Battle, Kemp P. (1907). History of the University of North Carolina: From its Beginning to the Death of President Swain, 1789–1868. Vol. I. Raleigh, North Carolina: Edwards & Broughton Print. Co. – via the Internet Archive.
- Battle, Kemp P. (1912). History of the University of North Carolina: From 1868–1912. Vol. II. Raleigh, North Carolina: Edwards & Broughton Print. Co. – via the Internet Archive.
- Brophy, Alfred L. (2008). "VII:The University and the Slaves: Apology and its Meaning" (PDF). In Gibney, Mark; Howard-Hassmann, Rhoda E.; Coicaud, Jean-Marc; Steiner, Niklaus (eds.). The Age of Apology: Facing Up to the Past. Philadelphia: University of Pennsylvania Press. pp. 109–119. Archived (PDF) from the original on March 30, 2016.
- Hamilton, Joseph Grégoire de Roulhac; Wagstaff, Henry McGilbert, eds. (1910). Benjamin Sherwood Hedrick. The James Sprunt Historical Publications. Vol. 10. Chapel Hill, North Carolina: University of North Carolina Press. Archived from the original on July 24, 2008.
- Lea, Diane; Little, Ruth (2006). The Town and Gown Architecture of Chapel Hill, North Carolina, 1795-1975 (Distributed for the Preservation Society of Chapel Hill). Chapel Hill: University of North Carolina Press. ISBN 0-8078-3072-0.
- Sherman, Joan R (1997). Black Bard of North Carolina: George Moses Horton and His Poetry. Chapel Hill, North Carolina: University of North Carolina Press. ISBN 0807823414.
- Wheeler, John H. (1851). Historical sketches of North Carolina from 1584 to 1851. Compiled from original records, official documents and traditional statements; with biographical sketches of her distinguished statesmen, jurists, lawyers, soldiers, divines, etc. Vol. 1 (1st ed.). Philadelphia: Lippincott, Grambo, & Co. – via Google Books.
