= List of leaders of the University of North Carolina at Chapel Hill =

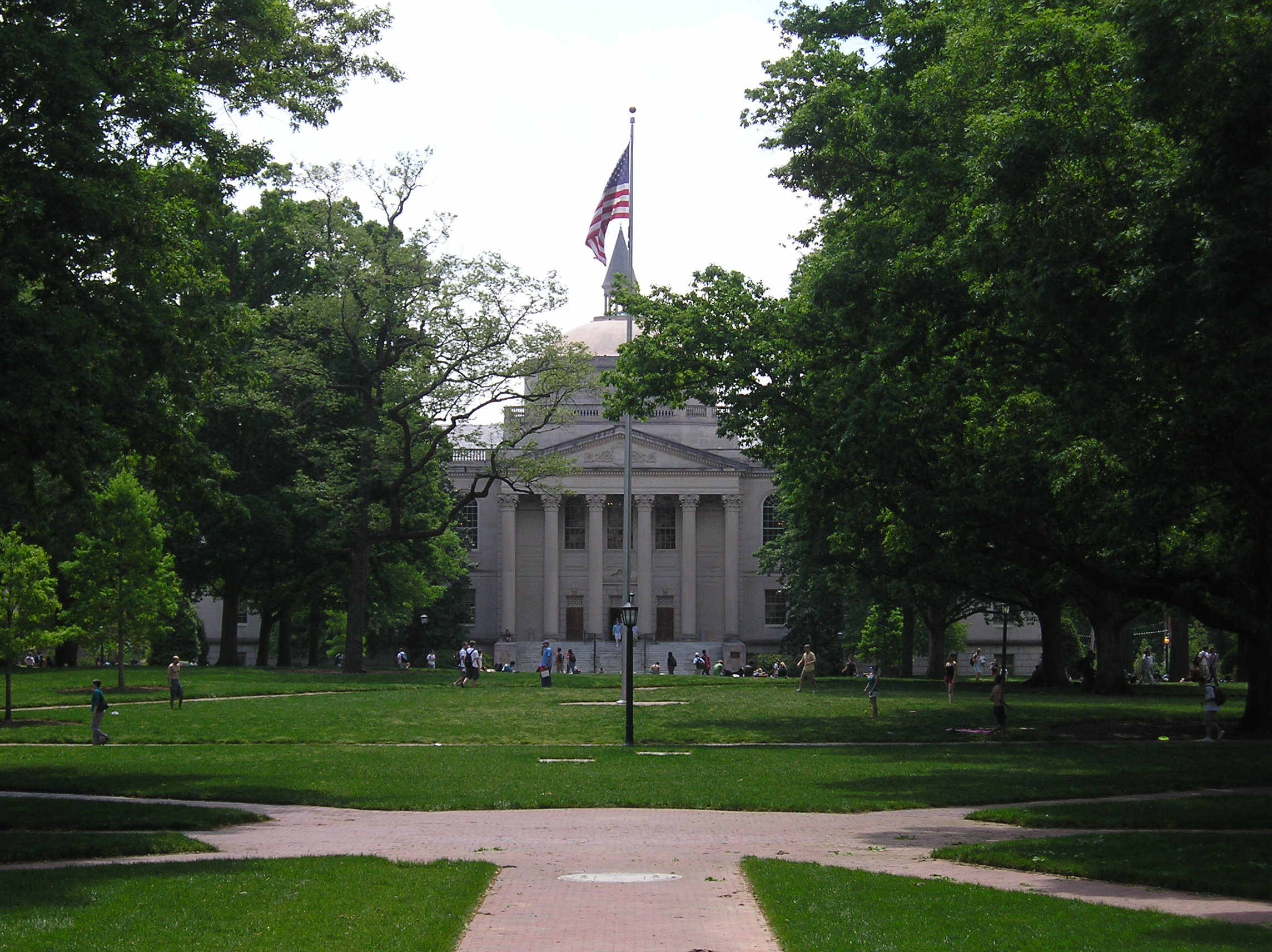
Polk Place, looking toward Wilson Library on the UNC campus

Leaders of the University of North Carolina at Chapel Hill were known as "presidents" until the formation of the Consolidated University of North Carolina in 1932. Between 1934 and 1945, the title "Dean of Administration" was used for the leader of the university (subordinate to the president of the Consolidated University system), which in turn became "chancellor". An asterisk (*) indicates an interim or acting appointment.

== Presiding professors ==
Image	Name	Term
	Rev. David Ker	1794–1796
	Charles Wilson Harris	1796
	Rev. Joseph Caldwell	1796–1797
	James Smiley Gillaspie (or Gillespie)	1797–1799
	Rev. Joseph Caldwell	1799–1804

== Presidents ==
Image	Name	Term
	Rev. Joseph Caldwell	1804–1812
	Robert Hett Chapman	1812–1816
	Rev. Joseph Caldwell	1816–1835
	Elisha Mitchell *	1835
	David Lowry Swain	1835–1868
	Rev. Solomon Pool	1869–1872
	Rev. Charles Phillips	1875–1876
	Kemp Plummer Battle	1876–1891
	George Tayloe Winston	1891–1896
	Edwin Anderson Alderman	1896–1900
	Francis Preston Venable	1900–1914
	Edward Kidder Graham	1914–1918
	Marvin Hendrix Stacy*	1918–1919
	Harry Woodburn Chase	1919–1930
	Frank Porter Graham	1930–1932

== Dean of administration ==
Image	Name	Term
	Robert Burton House	1934–1945

== Chancellors ==
Image	Name	Term
	Robert Burton House	1945–1957
	William Brantley Aycock	1957–1964
	Paul Frederick Sharp	1964–1965
	Joseph Carlyle Sitterson	1965–1972
	Nelson Ferebee Taylor	1972–1980
	Christopher Columbus Fordham	1980–1988
	Paul Hardin III	1988–1995
	Michael Hooker	1995–1999
	William Octavius McCoy *	1999–2000
	James Moeser	2000–2008
	Herbert Holden Thorp	2008–2013
	Carol L. Folt	2013–2019
	Kevin Guskiewicz	2019–2024
	Lee Roberts	2024–present
