= Hollomon =

Hollomon is a surname. Notable people with the surname include:

- Gus Hollomon (born 1945), American football defensive back
- John Herbert Hollomon Jr. (1919–1985), American engineer known for
  - Hollomon–Jaffe parameter
  - Zener–Hollomon parameter

== See also ==
- Holloman (surname)
