= J. Carlyle Sitterson =

American educator and academic (1911-1995)

- Sitterson pictured in Yackety Yak 1967, UNC yearbook

President of the University of North Carolina
- In office 1966–1972
- Preceded by: Paul Frederick Sharp
- Succeeded by: Nelson Ferebee Taylor

Personal details
- Born: January 17, 1911 Kinston, North Carolina
- Died: May 19, 1995 (aged 84) Chapel Hill, North Carolina
- Education: University of North Carolina
- Profession: Educator

Joseph Carlyle "Lyle" Sitterson (January 17, 1911 – May 19, 1995) was an American educator who served as chancellor of the University of North Carolina at Chapel Hill from February 16, 1966, to January 31, 1972.

A native of Kinston, North Carolina, Sitterson first came to UNC in 1927 as an undergraduate student. He remained at the University, joining the faculty of the history department in 1935 and later earning his Ph.D., also in history. In 1955, Sitterson became the dean of the School of Arts and Sciences, becoming vice chancellor in 1965 under Chancellor Paul F. Sharp.

On February 16, 1966, Sitterson was installed as chancellor of the University, succeeding outgoing Chancellor Paul Sharp. Sitterson took office in the midst of the controversy surrounding the North Carolina Speaker Ban Law, a state law passed on June 26, 1963 by the North Carolina General Assembly which forbade individuals who were known to be members of the Communist Party or had invoked the Fifth Amendment in connection with congressional investigations of communist activities from speaking on any of the campuses of the University of North Carolina.

Student leaders and faculty members of the University of North Carolina at Chapel Hill led a campus movement in opposition to the law, which climaxed with the invitation of speakers Herbert Aptheker (an avowed communist) and Frank Wilkinson (an outspoken critic of the House Un-American Activities Committee). Two weeks into his chancellorship, Sitterson denied the students' request to allow Aptheker and Wilkinson to speak on campus. On March 2, 1966, Frank Wilkinson spoke to a crowd of more than 2,000 students from across a wall that separated the campus of the University from the surrounding town of Chapel Hill - thereby avoiding trespass of the law. On March 9, 1966, Aptheker followed in Wilkinson's footsteps, speaking to a similar sized crowd from a position across the wall. The denial of the speakers' invitations was used as the basis for the lawsuit which, in 1968, eventually overturned the North Carolina Speaker Ban Law before a U.S. District Court in Greensboro, North Carolina. Student leaders took the role as the plaintiffs in the lawsuit while Sitterson, UNC System President William C. Friday (somewhat ironically as Sitterson and Friday were firm opponents of the Speaker Ban), the University of North Carolina and the State of North Carolina were the defendants.

Sitterson faced other challenges during his tenure including a 1969 strike of campus dining facility employees, which was led by a new African American student organization called the Black Student Movement and a general walkout of students following the murders of four Kent State University students in May 1970.

Throughout Sitterson's career as an administrator at the University of North Carolina at Chapel Hill, he continued to teach courses in history. Chancellor J. Carlyle Sitterson was succeeded by Chancellor Ferebee Taylor on January 31, 1972.

Sitterson also worked with a number of service organizations, specifically Research Triangle Institute and the North Carolina Center for the Advancement of Teaching (NCCAT), a group formed in 1984 with the goal of promoting professional development among teachers in the arts, sciences, and humanities. Sitterson served as NCCAT's first board chair.

In 1987, the University opened Sitterson Hall, named for the former chancellor, which is currently the home of the UNC Department of Computer Science.
