= Paul F. Sharp =

American academic administrator

Paul Sharp
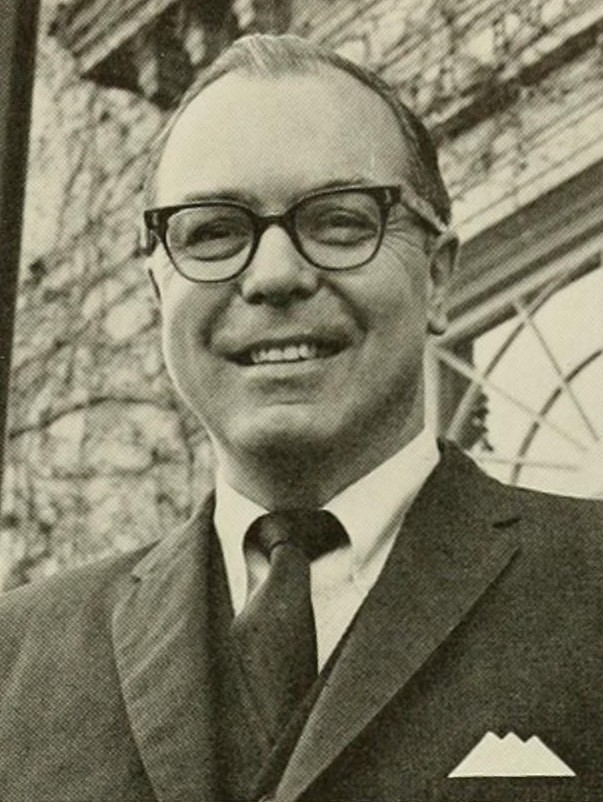

15th President of Hiram College
- In office 1957–1964
- Preceded by: Paul H. Fall
- Succeeded by: James N. Primm

3rd Chancellor of University of North Carolina at Chapel Hill
- In office 1965–1966
- Preceded by: William Brantley Aycock
- Succeeded by: J. Carlyle Sitterson

7th President of Drake University
- In office 1966–1971
- Preceded by: Henry Gadd Harmon
- Succeeded by: Wilbur C. Miller

9th President of the University of Oklahoma
- In office 1971–1977
- Preceded by: John Herbert Hollomon Jr.
- Succeeded by: William S. Banowsky

Personal details
- Born: January 19, 1918 Kirksville, Missouri
- Died: February 19, 2009 (aged 91) Norman, Oklahoma
- Education: Phillips University; University of Minnesota
- Occupation: Historian and educational administrator
- Known for: Historical works on the Canadian-American West, and a distinguished record as a university president

Paul Frederick Sharp (January 19, 1918 – February 19, 2009) was a professor and college administrator. He served as the 15th president of Hiram College from 1957 to 1964, the 3rd chancellor of the University of North Carolina, Chapel Hill from 1964 to 1965, the president of Drake University, and the 9th president of the University of Oklahoma from 1971 to 1977. Before his stint as a college administrator, Sharp was a professor of history at Iowa State University and the University of Wisconsin, Madison.

== Early life and education ==
Sharp was born in Kirksville, Missouri. He was raised in Crookston, Minnesota, by parents who were both medical doctors. He earned his bachelor's degree at Phillips University.

He served in the United States Navy during World War II. He was assigned for much of this time as a liaison officer with the Australian Navy. He earned his doctoral degree in history from the University of Minnesota. He was an instructor in history at the University of Minnesota while earning his Ph.D. there.

== Academic career ==
Sharp started his academic career as an associate professor at Iowa State University. He then moved to the University of Wisconsin–Madison, where he was a full professor.

In 1952 Sharp did a Fulbright scholarship in Australia.

== Scholarly impact ==
Sharp made a significant contribution to the international history of the Great Plains and the Canadian-American West. This line of work is anchored by two books. The first is The Agrarian Revolt in Western Canada: A Survey Showing American Parallels, 1948. Although Agrarian Revolt later would be recognized as a pioneering work of scholarship crossing the Forty-Ninth Parallel, in its time it was little appreciated. American historians were indifferent to Canadian topics, while Canadian historians were preoccupied with their own, nationalistic interpretations. The second book is Whoop-Up Country: The Canadian-American West, 1865–1885, 1955. Whoop-Up Country was well received, but Sharp, in retrospect, never thought reviewers and readers fully appreciated its revisionist cast. He intended the work to be a critical test, in the borderlands of Montana and Alberta, of Walter Prescott Webb's thesis of environmental determinism. Sharp concluded that Canadian national will, particularly the construction of the Canadian Pacific Railroad, was capable of overriding environment as a historical influence on the Canadian Prairies.

== Academic administrator ==
In 1964 Sharp took over the leadership of the University of North Carolina at Chapel Hill. Much of his time there was involved in trying to bring about the repeal of the North Carolina Speaker Ban. Early in his administration Sharp oversaw the consolidation of academic affairs, health affairs and research administration into one office. He left in at the end of 1965, serving only 17 months as chancellor. He let UNC Chapel Hill in large part because of the ambiguity caused by lack of clear definitions and dinstictions between the role of the UNC Chapel Hill Chancellor and the University of North Carolina president.

During his time as head of Drake University from 1966 to 1971 Sharp oversaw a 20% growth in enrollment and a 40% growth in the size of the faculty. He also oversaw the expansion of the number of master's programs and the creation of the first doctoral program at the university. He also oversaw the building of about three major buildings on the campus, doubling the size of the library and the start of construction on a fine arts building.

Sharp was head of the University of Oklahoma for six and a half years, from 1971 until 1978. During this time he lobbied heavily for the state legislature to increase funding for higher education. He also was the first president of the university to focus heavily on private fundraising.

== Private life ==
Sharp and his wife Rose met while both on the debate team at Philips University. They were the parents of three children.

== Later life ==
After stepping down as head of the University of Oklahoma due to health issues, Sharp worked for 10 years as the Regents Professor of history and higher education at that institution.

He also worked as a consultant to many organizations. He was the founding chairman of the Norman Community Foundation.

== Publications ==
- Chapter "From Poverty to Prosperity" in The Heritage of the Middle West, John J. Murray ed., 1959

Preceded by Henry Gadd Harmon	President of Drake University; 1966–1971	Succeeded by Wilbur C. Miller

Preceded by John Herbert Hollomon Jr.	President of the University of Oklahoma; 1971–1977	Succeeded by William S. Banowsky
