= Hollimon =

Hollimon, meaning Holy-Man, is a surname. Notable people with the surname include:

- Clarence Hollimon (1937–2000), American guitarist
- Greg Hollimon (born 1956), American actor
- Joe Hollimon (born 1952), American football player
- LeBaron Hollimon (born 1969), American soccer player and coach
- Mike Hollimon (born 1982), American baseball player
- Ulysses Hollimon (1931–2023), American baseball player

== See also ==
- Holliman
- Hollomon
