= Nelson Ferebee Taylor =

American lawyer (1921–2004)

5th Chancellor of University of North Carolina at Chapel Hill
- In office 1972–1980
- Preceded by: J. Carlyle Sitterson
- Succeeded by: Christopher Columbus Fordham

Personal details
- Born: January 24, 1921 Oxford, North Carolina
- Died: February 25, 2004 (aged 83) Chapel Hill, North Carolina
- Education: University of North Carolina at Chapel Hill; Harvard Law School; Oxford University
- Occupation: Attorney and educator

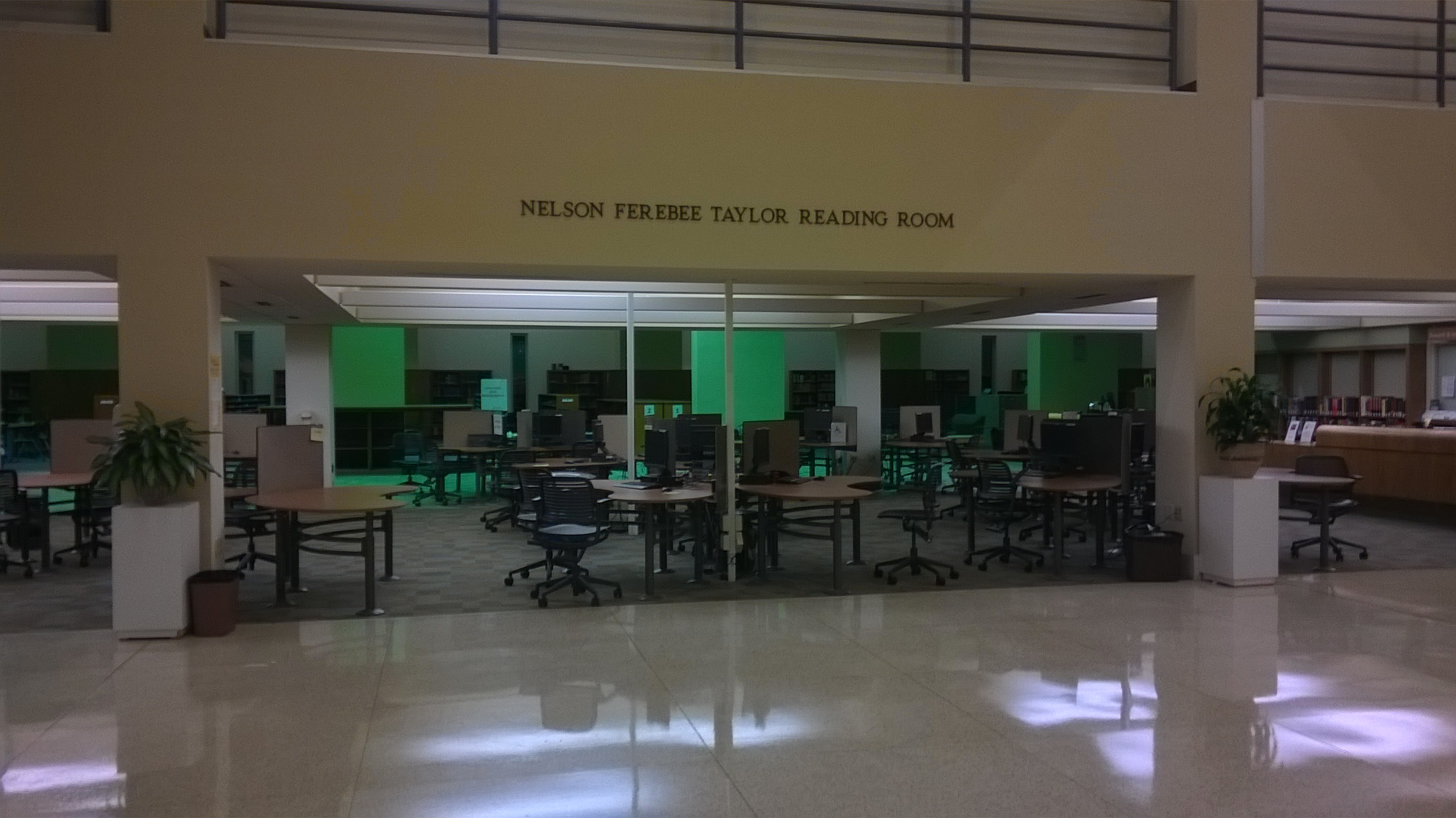
Nelson Ferebee Taylor Reading Room in Davis Library

Nelson Ferebee Taylor (January 24, 1921 – February 25, 2004) was an American lawyer and educational administrator who served as chancellor of the University of North Carolina at Chapel Hill from 1972 to 1980.

== Early life ==
Taylor grew up in Oxford, North Carolina and graduated from UNC-Chapel Hill with a bachelor's degree in American history. One of his grandfathers was politician Dennis Ferebee.

During World War II, Taylor served in the U.S. Navy and was awarded the Bronze Star. After the war, he earned his law degree at Harvard Law School and earned degrees at Oxford University as a Rhodes Scholar.

== Career ==
He practiced law in New York for some time, but returned to Chapel Hill in 1968 as a visiting law professor and in 1970 became vice president for administration for the University of North Carolina System. Then, he was selected as UNC-Chapel Hill's fifth chancellor in 1972, when the UNC System grew to its current size of 16 constituent institutions. Taylor joined the University of North Carolina School of Law faculty in 1973.

As chancellor, Taylor launched the Carolina Challenge to increase UNC’s endowment to $100 million. The goal was reached in 1985, and two new foundations were created – the Institutional Development Foundation and the Arts and Sciences Foundation. UNC’s physical holdings also grew during Taylor’s term, to include the old Country Club property and the Baity property, which is the current site of the Dean E. Smith Center, the Kenan Center and the Kenan-Flagler School of Business, and the Koury Natatorium. Taylor took special interest in improving the campus’s library facilities. He helped secure funds for the construction of Davis Library, the expansion of the Health Sciences Library and renovation of Wilson Library. He also supported a substantial increase in the library’s holdings. The Nelson Ferebee Taylor Reading Room in Davis Library was dedicated in 1986.

Taylor also advocated diversity in the student body and faculty. From 1972 to 1979, black faculty members increased 280 percent (to 57); other minority faculty members increased 27 percent; and female faculty increased 32 percent. In terms of students, black enrollment grew 87 percent and female enrollment increased 52 percent. Taylor also oversaw the creation of the Pogue scholarships, which were created to attract top students from North Carolina with an emphasis on minority applicants.

== Later life and honours ==
He stepped down as chancellor in January 1980, following a heart attack a year earlier, but continued to teach law until 1991. He was named Cary C. Boshamer Distinguished Professor of Law and received the Frederick B. McCall Award for Teaching Excellence. In addition, an award in Taylor’s name was created 1991 and is awarded annually to a graduating law student for excellence in corporate law. Another award in his name was created by the class of 1982. The annual award recognizes a senior who has “made the greatest contribution to the continued vitality and strength of the honor code in the community.”
