= John Herbert Hollomon Jr. =

Engineer and university president

8th President of the University of Oklahoma
- In office 1968–1970
- Preceded by: George Lynn Cross
- Succeeded by: Paul F. Sharp

Personal details
- Born: March 12, 1919 Norfolk, Virginia
- Died: May 8, 1985 (aged 66) Albany, New York
- Education: Massachusetts Institute of Technology
- Profession: Founding member of the National Academy of Engineering

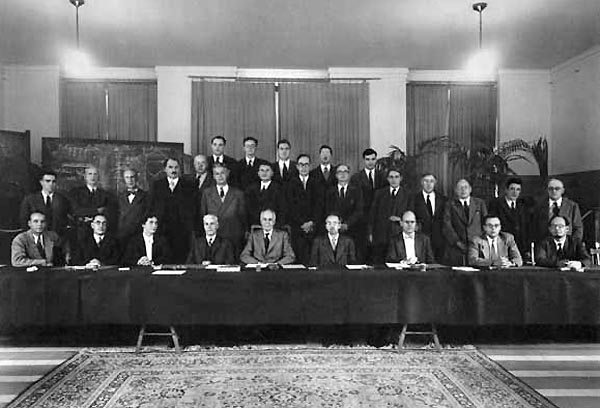
Solvay Conference on Physics in Brussels 1951. Left to right, sitting: Crussaro, Allen, Cauchois, Borelius, Bragg, Møller, Sietz, Hollomon, Frank; middle row: Gerhart Rathenau, Koster, Erik Rudberg, Flamache, Goche, Groven, Orowan, Burgers, Shockley, Guinier, C.S. Smith, Dehlinger, Laval, Henriot; top row: Gaspart, Lomer, Cottrell, Homes, Curien

John Herbert Hollomon Jr. (March 12, 1919 – May 8, 1985) was a noted American engineer and founding member of the National Academy of Engineering.

== Biography ==
Hollomon was born in Norfolk, Virginia. He earned his B.S. in physics and in 1946 received his D.Sc. from the Massachusetts Institute of Technology (MIT) in metallurgy. Following wartime service as a major in the United States Army at the Watertown Arsenal, he served as an instructor at Rensselaer Polytechnic Institute. He then joined the General Electric laboratories in Schenectady, New York, where he eventually became general manager.

In 1962, he was appointed First Assistant Secretary for Science and Technology at the United States Department of Commerce. In this role he established the Environmental Sciences Services Administration (later, the National Oceanic and Atmospheric Administration), the Commerce Technical Advisory Board, and the State Technical Services program. He served for part of 1967 as acting United States Under Secretary of Commerce, but left government for the University of Oklahoma where he served one year as president-designate and two as president.

In 1970, Hollomon returned to MIT as consultant to the president and subsequently as Professor of Engineering. In 1983, he moved to the Boston University campus, where he remained until his death.

== See also ==
- Hollomon–Jaffe parameter
- Zener–Hollomon parameter
- Strain hardening exponent
- Work hardening

Preceded by George Lynn Cross	President of the University of Oklahoma; 1968–1970	Succeeded by Paul F. Sharp
