= First university in the United States =

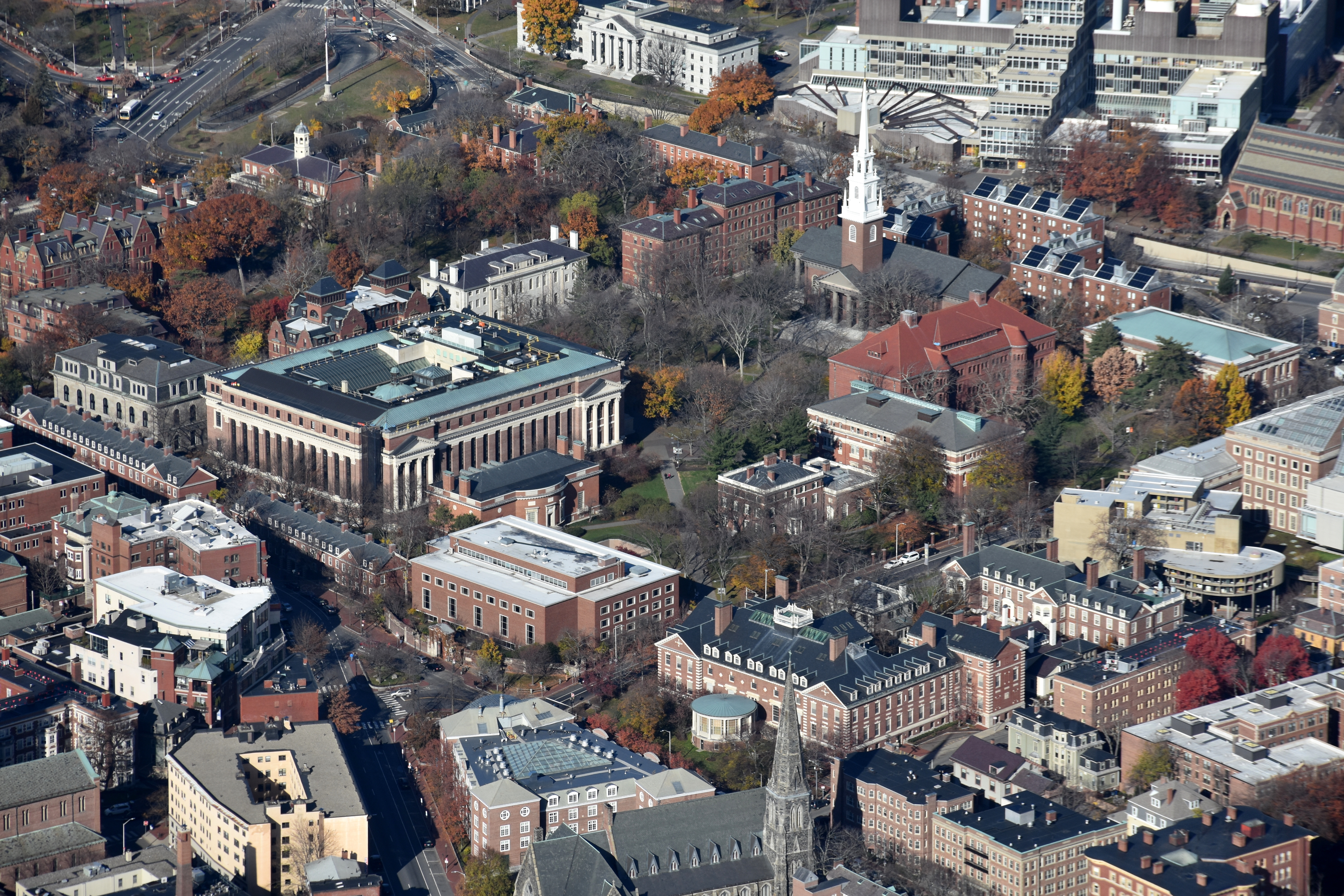
Harvard University has operated under the same corporation since 1650, making it the oldest institution of higher learning in the United States.

The first university in the United States is a status that has been asserted by or given to more than one university in the United States. These include Harvard University, the oldest institution of higher education in the United states, College of William & Mary, and the University of Pennsylvania.

== Definition of a university ==
There is no consensus national definition of what entitles an institution to be considered a university versus a college. Differing definitions are used at the state level, and the common understanding of university has evolved over time. The 1911 Encyclopædia Britannica describes the gradual emergence of U.S. universities as follows:

In the United States the word university has been applied to institutions of the most diverse character, and it is only since 1880 or thereabouts that an effort has been seriously made to distinguish between collegiate and university instruction; nor has that effort yet completely succeeded. Harvard, William and Mary, and Yale . . . were organized . . . on the plans of the English colleges which constitute the universities of Oxford and Cambridge. Graduates of Harvard and Yale carried these British traditions to other places, and similar colleges grew up in New York, New Jersey, Pennsylvania, New Hampshire and Rhode Island.... Around or near these nuclei, during the course of the 19th century, one or more professional schools were frequently attached, and so the word university was naturally applied to a group of schools associated more or less closely with a central school or college. Harvard, for example, most comprehensive of all, has seventeen distinct departments, and Yale has almost as many. Columbia and Penn have a similar scope. In the latter part of the 19th century Yale, Columbia, Princeton and Brown, in recognition of their enlargement, formally changed their titles from colleges to universities.

The issue is further confused by the fact that at time of founding of many of the institutions in question, the United States did not exist as a sovereign nation. Questions of institutional continuity sometimes make it difficult to determine the true age of any institution. The status of first university, which includes private universities, is distinct from the claim of oldest public university in the United States, a title claimed by the University of North Carolina at Chapel Hill (first operating), University of Georgia (first chartered), and the College of William & Mary (initially private).

== Claimants and potential claimants ==
Several universities claim to be the first university in the United States:

- Harvard University, founded in 1636, claims to be "the oldest institution of higher education in the United States". The claim of being "the first university" has been made on its behalf by others. An early official mention of Harvard as "the University" is found in the Massachusetts Constitution, first submitted on October 28, 1779, by James Bowdoin, Samuel Adams, and John Adams.
- The University of Pennsylvania, which makes a disputed claim to have been established in 1740, (Note: The university officially uses 1740 as its founding date and has since 1899. The ideas and intellectual inspiration for the academic institution stem from 1749, with a pamphlet published by Benjamin Franklin, (1705/1706–1790). When Franklin's institution was established, it inhabited a schoolhouse built on November 14, 1740, for another school, which never came to practical fruition. Penn archivist Mark Frazier Lloyd notes: "In 1899, UPenn's Trustees adopted a resolution that established 1740 as the founding date, but good cases may be made for 1749, when Franklin first convened the Trustees, or 1751, when the first classes were taught at the affiliated secondary school for boys, Academy of Philadelphia, or 1755, when Penn obtained its collegiate charter to add a post-secondary institution, the College of Philadelphia." Princeton's library presents another, diplomatically phrased view.) considers itself to be America's first university, a title it claims on its website and in other published materials, due to its (1) medical school being established as a separate faculty from the undergraduate college in 1765 and (2) receiving a revised charter in 1779 as the "University of the State of Pennsylvania". The university has published a book about being the first university in America, and its website contains numerous instances of the phrase "America's First University".
- The College of William & Mary's website states that in 1779, the College of William and Mary had the "First law school in America, which made W&M the first college in the country to become a university".

== Claims of first university in the United States ==
=== Institutional age ===
Harvard University calls itself "the oldest institution of higher learning in the United States", and this claim is rarely challenged. It is possible to disagree what year should be taken as Harvard's real founding date. Harvard uses the earliest possible one, 1636, the year in which the Massachusetts General Court resolved to establish a fund in a year's time for a "School or College" to be started, which occurred in 1637 when the Massachusetts Bay Colony issued Harvard a charter. However, Harvard has operated since 1650 under the same corporation, the "President and Fellows of Harvard College"; as such, it has an unbroken institutional history dating back to the mid seventeenth century.

The College of William & Mary calls itself "the second-oldest institution of higher learning in the country", acknowledging Harvard's claim but adding that: "Harvard may have opened first, but William & Mary was already planned. Original 1619 plans for W&M called for a campus at Henrico." This refers to the College of Henricopolis or University of Henrico established by the Virginia Company near Richmond, Virginia. (Note: This institution received a royal charter in 1618 and operated a school for several years before being destroyed with the town during the Indian massacre of 1622, but it never offered college-level instruction. The following year, King James I dissolved the Virginia Company, converting the Colony of Virginia to a crown colony. William and Mary was founded with a 1693 royal charter.)

=== Degrees and teaching ===
Harvard began awarding degrees in arts in 1642; it did not receive any formal authorization to do so, but its graduates were admitted to ad eundem degrees at Oxford and Cambridge between 1648 and 1669 indicating that they were recognized academically. The charter of 1650 also made no mention of degrees. However, the charter of 1692 (later disallowed by the King of England) gave the college the "power from time to time, to grant and admit to Academical Degrees, as in the Universities in England".

From its founding in 1693 until the appointment of the first professor of mathematics in 1721, William & Mary consisted solely of a grammar school. It awarded an honorary Master of Arts degree to Benjamin Franklin in 1756 but did not award Bachelor of Arts degrees until 1772.

Teaching at what would become the University of Pennsylvania began at secondary school level in 1751 with the Academy and Charity School of Philadelphia. The College of Philadelphia was chartered in 1755 and the first class graduated in 1757.

=== Multiple academic fields ===
The president of Harvard at that time of the 1692 charter, Increase Mather, wanted to raise Harvard to full university status, and this meant granting degrees in at least one of the higher faculties (divinity, law, or medicine) in addition to arts. Regulations were drawn up for degrees in divinity and before the end of 1692, Harvard granted Mather the degree of Doctor of Divinity and two others degrees of Bachelor of Divinity under similar regulations to those in force at Oxford and Cambridge. The Hollis Professor of Divinity, Harvard's first endowed chair, was established in 1721.

The University of Pennsylvania claims to be the first university in America, drawing a distinction between this and the first college: "In the Anglo-American model, a college, by definition, is a faculty whose subject specialization is in a single academic field. This is usually arts and sciences (often referred to as 'liberal arts'), but may also be one of the professions: law, medicine, theology, etc. A university, by contrast, is the co-existence, under a single institutional umbrella, of more than one faculty. With the founding of the first medical school in America (in 1765; Columbia was second), Penn became America's first university."

With respect to the title of first university in America, the College of William & Mary has made the claim on its website that "in 1781, by uniting the faculties of law, medicine, and the arts, William & Mary became America's first true university". Elsewhere on the website, it also claims to be the "First institution of higher education to have a law school, which made us the first college in the country to become a university (1779)". McSweeney, Ello and O'Brien also note that "in determining whether a school could be considered a studium generale, it seems to have been important that it have, in addition to a faculty of arts, one or more of the higher faculties of medicine, civil law, canon law, or theology", and that theology was taught by two professors of divinity at William & Mary from 1729 until the abolition of the divinity school in 1779.

=== Official designation as a university ===
==== Harvard University ====
The Constitution of Massachusetts, submitted by James Bowdoin, Samuel Adams, and John Adams to the full Convention on October 28, 1779 and ratified on June 15, 1780, contains this language:

Chapter V. The University at Cambridge, and Encouragement of Literature, etc.

Section I. The University.

Art. I.--Whereas our wise and pious ancestors, so early as the year one thousand six hundred and thirty six, laid the foundation of Harvard-College, in which University many persons of great eminence have, by the blessing of GOD, been initiated in those arts and sciences, which qualified them for public employments, both in Church and State: And whereas the encouragement of Arts and Sciences, and all good literature, tends to the honor of God, the advantage of the christian religion, and the great benefit of this, and the other United States of America--It is declared, That the PRESIDENT AND FELLOWS OF HARVARD-COLLEGE, in their corporate capacity, and their successors in that capacity, their officers and servants, shall have, hold, use, exercise and enjoy, all the powers, authorities, rights, liberties, privileges, immunities and franchises, which they now have, or are entitled to have, hold, use, exercise and enjoy: And the same are hereby ratified and confirmed unto them, the said President and Fellows of Harvard-College, and to their successors, and to their officers and servants, respectively, forever.

In George Washington's honorary Doctor of Laws degree, conferred by Harvard on April 30, 1776, the text of the degree refers to Harvard twice as "our University".

==== University of Pennsylvania ====
The Pennsylvania state legislature passed a law on November 27, 1779, "to confirm the estates and interests of the college, academy, and charitable school of the city of Philadelphia ... and to erect the same into a university". This revoked the earlier charter and re-chartered the college as the "University of the State of Pennsylvania". On this basis, the University of Pennsylvania asserts that "No other American institution of higher learning was named 'University' before Penn was so named", and that "This was the first designation of an institution in the United States as a University".

The newly designated university was intended to continue the College of Philadelphia, established by Benjamin Franklin and chartered in 1755 alongside an academy chartered in 1753. However, the Pennsylvania legislature in 1779 suspected the provost of the College of Philadelphia, William Smith, and the existing board of trustees of loyalist sympathies. They therefore created a new board for the university, taking over the old college and academy. Following protests by Smith and the trustees of the college, the legislature reinstated the college's 1753 and 1755 charters in 1789 and the college regained possession of its buildings, with the university moving to the Philosophical Society Hall. This arrangement lasted two years before, following the adoption of a new constitution by the state, a new charter in 1791 merged the College of Philadelphia and the University of the State of Pennsylvania, forming the University of Pennsylvania.

==== William & Mary ====
On December 4, 1779, just seven days after the charter was issued for the University of the State of Pennsylvania, the board of visitors of the College of William & Mary adopted wide-ranging reforms that the college has traditionally seen as marking when it became a university.

In 2020, William & Mary law professor Thomas McSweeney along with two undergraduate students published an article in the William & Mary Law Review pointing out that the Latin text of the university's 1693 royal charter referred to the institution as a studium generale, translated in the English text by the relatively insignificant "place of universal study". They argue that by creating the institution as a studium generale, which was the technical term used for a university in the middle ages, William & Mary was granted the status of a university in its 1693 charter. The same phrase was noted by Jurgen Herbst in 1982, who said: "The charter used the Latin term studium generale to suggest possible growth into a full-fledged university". Edward Eggleston in 1900 noted that: "[the English text of the charter] is printed with Harwell, Blair and Clinton's account of Virginia, and the copy of the latter in the Library of Congress is annotated by some critic, who notes slight variations on the sense of the English version of the charter from the Latin original. The phrase 'studium generale' has a sense hardly appreciated by those who copied it from the ancient charter for William & Mary."

== See also ==
- Colonial colleges
- List of oldest universities in continuous operation
- Oldest public university in the United States
