= Daniel Tilton =

Mississippi territorial judge (1763–1830)

1st Judge of the Supreme Court of the Mississippi Territory
- In office May 7, 1798 – 1802
- Nominated by: John Adams
- Preceded by: Position created
- Succeeded by: David Ker

Personal details
- Born: Daniel Tilton; March 30, 1763 East Kingston, New Hampshire
- Died: November 20, 1830 (aged 67) Deerfield, New Hampshire
- Spouse: Isabel Thompson
- Education: Harvard College

Daniel Tilton (March 30, 1763 – November 20, 1830) was one of the three first judges of the Mississippi Territory Supreme Court, and the deliverer of the first Territorial Seal of Mississippi.

== Early life and education ==
Tilton was born in East Kingston, New Hampshire, on March 30, 1763, to David Tilton and Jane Greeley. He attended Phillips Exeter Academy in the neighboring town of Exeter, where he graduated in 1783. He attended Dartmouth College from 1786 to 1788, and graduated from Harvard College in 1790.

== Career ==
He was appointed by President John Adams to be one of the first judges of the newly formed Mississippi Territory along with Judge Peter Bryan Bruin and William McGuire, commissioned on May 7, 1798. On his journey to Mississippi from his native New Hampshire, he was entrusted with the carrying of the first Territorial Seal of Mississippi to the territory.

Prior to becoming a judge, Tilton was not a lawyer, though he did in fact study the law, the only judge on the court appointed by Adams at the time being Judge McGuire. The fact was noted by a sitting governor of the territory, William C. C. Claiborne, who protested in a letter to Secretary of State James Madison. In 1802, Tilton abruptly resigned, sailing to Europe from New Orleans in order to engage in "commercial business", never again returning to Mississippi. He was replaced by Judge David Ker, who was appointed by President Thomas Jefferson on the recommendations of the aforementioned Governor Claiborne and James Madison.

== Personal life ==
Tilton was married to Isabel Thompson in 1787 in East Kingston. He died on November 20, 1830, in Deerfield, New Hampshire, at the age of 67.

== See also ==
- List of Mississippi Territory judges

== Bibliography ==
- Catalogue of the Officers and Students of Phillips Exeter Academy, 1873–1883. Boston: J. S. Cushing & Co. 1883.
- Greely, George Hiram (1905). Genealogy of the Greely-Greeley Family. Boston: Frank Wood.
- The Harvard Graduates' Magazine: 1892—1893. Vol. 1. Boston: Harvard Graduates' Magazine Association. 1893.
- Lyons, Amanda (5 April 2011). "1798 Territorial Seal of Mississippi". Collections Blog. Mississippi Department of Archives and History.
- Powell, William S. (1988). Dictionary of North Carolina Biography: H–K. Vol. 3. Chapel Hill: University of North Carolina Press. ISBN 0-8078-1806-2.
- Rowland, Dunbar, ed. (1905). The Mississippi Territorial Archives, 1798–1803. Vol. 1. Nashville: Press of Brandon Printing Company.
- Rowland, Dunbar, ed. (1904). The Official and Statistical Register of the State of Mississippi. Nashville: Press of Brandon Printing Company.
