= George Moses Horton =

American writer (1798-1867)

- Born: c. 1798; Northampton County, North Carolina
- Died: Unknown after 1867
- Education: No formal education; mostly self-taught
- Occupations: Poet, formally Enslaved
- Spouse: Martha Snipes
- Children: Free, Rhody
- Writing career
- Years active: 1828–1867
- Period: Antebellum
- Genre: Poetry
- Subject: Freedom
- Notable works: The Hope of Liberty, Naked Genius

George Moses Horton (c. 1798–after 1867), was an African-American poet from North Carolina who was enslaved until Union troops, carrying the Emancipation Proclamation, reached North Carolina (1865). Horton is the first African-American author to be published in the United States. (Phillis Wheatley's poetry was published earlier, in the United Kingdom.) He is author of the first book of literature published in North Carolina and was known as the "Slave Poet".

== Biography ==
Horton was born into slavery on William Horton's plantation in about 1798 in Northampton County, North Carolina. He was the sixth of ten children; the names of his parents are unknown.

When Horton was six years old (1797), William Horton relocated his family and the people he held in slavery to a farm in Chatham County, North Carolina. This farm is where Horton lived until the end of the Civil War. In 1814 William Horton gave the younger enslaved people as property to his relative James Horton.

Horton began an interest in learning to read and write by listening to the Bible read aloud and the hymns he heard. He learned to read and write based on what he was hearing during revival meetings (which were mainly the Bible), calling them his "reading lessons." Horton began compiling pieces based on the verses that he remembered from the King James Version of the Bible.

Around 1817, Horton began making the approximately 10 mile (16 km) trip north to Chapel Hill in order to sell fruits and farm products for his master. Here, Horton took his ability for composing to write love poems for the University of North Carolina students, selling them for 25 cents or more. The students took an interest in Horton due to his ability to compose verses and his desire for greater knowledge. The students also gave him many books: he tells us of "Murray's English Grammar and its accordant branches [(Murray's studies of other languages)]; Samuel Johnson's Dictionary in miniature, and also Walker's [Rhyming Dictionary] and [Thomas] Sheridan's [A Complete Dictionary of the English Language], and parts of others. And other books of use they gave me, which I had no chance to peruse minutely, Milton's Paradise Lost, [James] Thompson's Seasons, parts of Homer's Iliad and Virgil's Ænead ( [sic]), Beauties of Shakespeare, Beauties of Byron, part of Plutarch, [Jedidiah] Morse's Geography, The Columbian Orator, [Richard] Snowden's History of the [American] Revolution, [Edward] Young's Night Thoughts, and some others".

Caroline Lee Hentz, author and playwright, also took an interest in Horton, teaching him to write and to improve his verses. Teaching Blacks to read and write was legal in North Carolina until 1836, when restrictions were imposed because of fears about slave revolts.

Hentz was highly influential in getting his poems "Liberty and Slavery" and "Slavery" (1828) published to the Lancaster Gazette in April of 1828, and wrote an introductory note. In June of the same year, she sent a third Horton poem, "On Poetry and Musick" (1828), to be also published by the Gazette. The three poems were renamed to be placed into his first collection, The Hope of Liberty (1829). Becoming known as a poet, Horton attempted unsuccessfully to earn enough money from his poetry to purchase his freedom.

Sometime in the 1830s, he "married" (legal marriages were not permitted) Martha Snipes, an enslaved woman owned by Franklin Snipes in Chatham County. The couple had two children, Free and Rhody among them. Little else is known about the family.

Twice Horton attempted to have others aid in his freedom, In 1844 he wrote a letter to abolitionist William Lloyd Garrison and in 1852 he wrote another letter to Horace Greeley, the editor of the New York Daily Tribune, and included a poem titled "A Poet's Feeble Petition" which expressed his longing for freedom. Neither letter reached their recipient due to the messenger Horton entrusted not passing them along and discarding them.

At age 60, around 1858, he described himself as "Belonging to Hal Horton living now in Chatham County".

In 1865, when Union troops arrived in his area, following the Emancipation Proclamation of 1863 they liberated all the enslaved in the states that had seceded. Horton befriended a young Union officer with that group, William H. S. Banks. He left Chapel Hill with Banks, traveling to Philadelphia in the free state of Pennsylvania.

After the Civil War and finally becoming a free man, Horton continued to write poetry for local newspapers. His poem "Forbidden to Ride on the Street Cars" expressed his disappointment in the unjust treatment of Blacks after emancipation. Arriving in Philadelphia before the summer of 1866, he wrote Sunday school stories on behalf of friends who lived in the city.

Disappointed with the racial discrimination he encountered in Philadelphia, Horton did succeed in emigrating to Bexley, Liberia, arriving January 7, 1867. This is the last known reference to him. While later death dates are found in some recent publications, his death location, date, and burial are unknown. He may have returned to Philadelphia.

== Poetry ==
In 1828 a number of newspapers in North Carolina and beyond discussed Horton's work. Horton was the first Southern Black to publish literature. Though he knew how to read, he published the book before he had learned how to write. As he recalled, "I fell to work in my head, and composed several undigested pieces."

George Moses Horton's signature

After Horton's first poem was published in the Lancaster, Massachusetts, Gazette, his works were published in other newspapers, such as the Register in Raleigh, North Carolina, and Freedom's Journal in New York City. Horton's poetic style was typical of contemporary European poetry and was similar to poems written by white contemporaries, likely a reflection of his reading and his work for commission. He wrote both sonnets and ballads. His earlier works focused on his life in slavery. Such topics, however, were more generalized and not necessarily based on his personal experience. He referred to his life on the "vile accursed earth" and the "drudg'ry, pain, and toil" of life, as well as his oppression "because my skin is black".

His first collection, The Hope of Liberty (1829), was focused on the issues of slavery and bondage. He did not gain enough in sales from that book to purchase his freedom; in his second book, he mentions slavery only twice. The change in theme is also likely due to the more restrictive climate in the South in the years leading up to the Civil War.

In 1845, Horton published another book of poetry, The Poetical Works of George M. Horton, The Colored Bard of North-Carolina, To Which Is Prefixed The Life of the Author, Written by Himself. Newspapers took notice again in December–January 1849 – 1850, and advertisements for the book were printed in a Hillsborough newspaper from 1852 into 1853. Horton was given direct credit for some poems published in newspapers in 1857 and 1858. A short announcement/review of his last book, Naked Genius appeared in the Raleigh Daily Progress on 31 August 1865.

His later works, especially those written after his emancipation, expressed rural and pastoral themes. Like other early Black American writers such as Jupiter Hammon and Phillis Wheatley, Horton was deeply influenced by the Bible and African-American religion.

Horton gained the admiration of North Carolina Governor John Owen, influential newspapermen Horace Greeley and William Lloyd Garrison, and numerous other Northern abolitionists. He was said to be an admirer of Byron, whose poetry he used as a model.

The earliest known critical commentary on Horton's writing is from 1909 by University of North Carolina professor Collier Cobb. He dismissed Horton's antislavery themes, claiming without evidence: "George never really cared for more liberty than he had, but was fond of playing to the grandstand."

In 2017 the only known essay by Horton, "Individual Influence", was published for the first time.

== Poetry collections ==
=== The Hope of Liberty (1829) ===
This was Horton's first true attempt to buy his freedom. Most of the poems in the collection were themed around antislavery either indirect or directly. One was a thank you poem towards his publisher. Three previously published poems of were reworked and put into other poems in the collection. The editorial "Explanation" that opens The Hope of Freedom speaks of Horton's desire to emigrate to the new colony of Liberia; the collection was published so as to encourage donations.

=== The Museum (never published) ===
Professor William Green of UNC-Chapel Hill, was editing the manuscript but the collection as a whole was never published. Many poems instead were published elsewhere or in his following collections.

=== Poetical Works (1845) ===
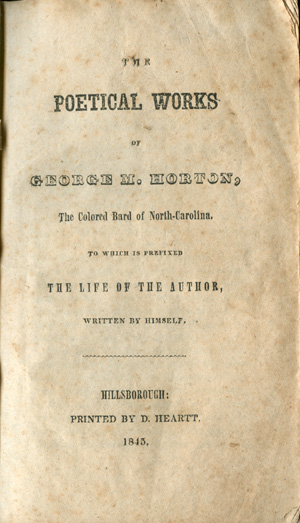
Title page to Poetical Works of George M. Horton (1845)

Published in Raleigh, North Carolina, this collection consisted of 45 poems, none directly about being enslaved or slavery in general. The reason for this was Horton expressed he was no longer inspired to write about slavery. Also due to North Carolina being more actively pro-slavery nearing the Civil War, Horton believed a collection similar to his first would not be published.

=== The Naked Genius: The Colored Bard of North-Carolina (1865) ===
Horton wrote 132 poems between the years 1820 - 1865 which were compiled into this collection. Forty-three poems were reprinted from previous collections or those already published in newspapers, in large, the theme of the collection was to thank his sponsors and those helping to give him his freedom, including President Lincoln and Union Army Generals. Horton hoped this collection would set him apart from the title of Slave Poet and give him distinction from his poetry. As well as further prove the capability of Black men.

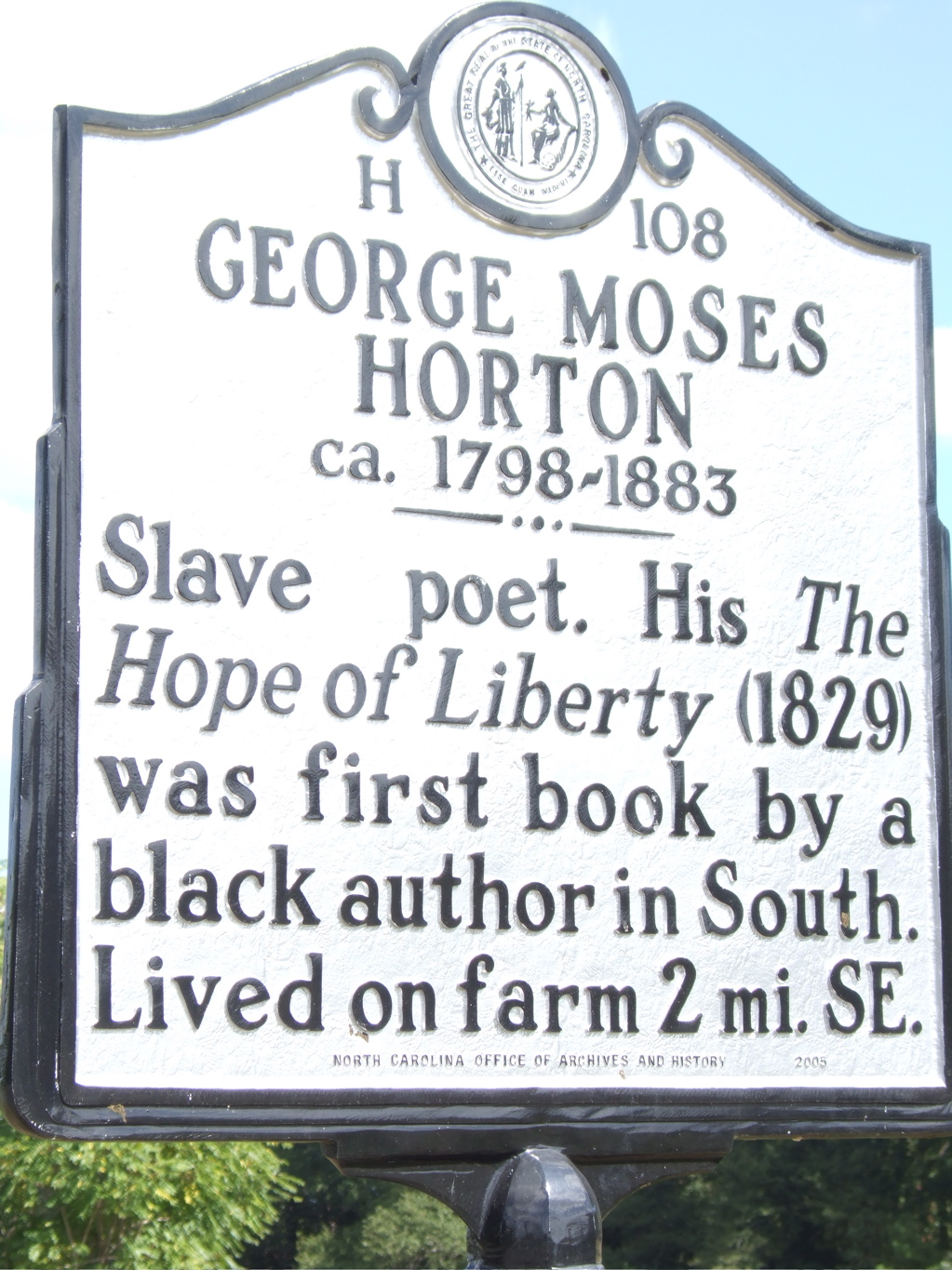

== Horton "firsts" ==
- The first African American to publish a book in the United States.
- The first published North Carolina author of literature.
- The first enslaved American to publish a book.
- The first American slave to protest his bondage in verse
- The first African American to publish a book in the South; the only slave to earn a significant income by selling his poems; the only poet of any race to produce a book of poems before he could write; and the only slave to publish two volumes of poetry while in bondage and another shortly after emancipation."

== Legacy ==
Building towards his remembrance, biographies began to appear. The first was by Kemp Plummer Battle in May 1888, at that time President of the University of North Carolina. J. Donald Cameron noted Horton among notable North Carolina poets in 1890, in a speech that was reported in several newspapers. Battle reprised his thoughts on Horton in his history of the university, published in 1907. In 1909 UNC professor Collier Cobb wrote a paper on Horton, which he published in 1925 at his own expense. Horton was remembered at the University of North Carolina on the occasion of the visit of James Weldon Johnson. The centennial of his first book was noted in the New York Age after it was noted in Greensboro.

- In 1927 Winston-Salem, North Carolina, opened a segregated library for Blacks in a YWCA building; it was named for George Moses Horton.
- In the 1930s, A Horton School, for Black children, opened in Pittsboro, North Carolina. It later became Horton High School. After integration in the 1970s, it became Horton Middle School.
- In June 1978, North Carolina Governor Jim Hunt declared June 28 “George Moses Horton Day.”
- In the 1990s, North Carolina erected a historical marker about Horton at the intersection of U.S. 15/501 and Mount Gilead Church Road, Chatham County Road 1700 (35° 47.618′ N, 79° 5.992′ W). According to the marker, he lived about 2 miles (3.2 km) to the southeast. (See photo)
- In 1996 Horton was inducted into the North Carolina Literary Hall of Fame.
- Also in 1996, the George Moses Horton Society for the Study of African American Poetry was founded in Chapel Hill.
- In 1997, Horton was named as Historic Poet Laureate of Chatham County, North Carolina.
- In 2006, the University of North Carolina at Chapel Hill named a dormitory for George Moses Horton; it is believed to be the first university dormitory in the country to be named for a slave.
- In 2015 author/illustrator Don Tate published Poet: The Remarkable Story of George Moses Horton, an illustrated biography for children. The Wilson Library at the University of North Carolina hosted the national launch of the book on September 3, 2015.

== Published works ==
- Horton, George M. (1829). The Hope of Liberty, containing a number of poetical pieces. Contains "Explanation" from the publisher. Reprinted by Kraus Reprint, 1973. Raleigh, North Carolina.
- Horton, George M. (1837). Poems by a slave. According to a "Preface to the Second Edition" signed by "L. C. G.", who did not know the author, only one copy of the first edition has ever been seen; that copy belonging to Joshua Coffin. The editor says it is reproduced unchanged except for the change of title. (2nd ed.). Philadelphia.
- Wheatley, Phillis; Horton, George M. (1838). Memoir and poems of Phillis Wheatley, a native African and a slave : also, Poems by a slave (3rd ed.). Boston: Isaac Knapp.
- Horton, George M. (1845). The Poetical Works of George M. Horton, the colored bard of North-Carolina : to which is prefixed The life of the author, written by himself. Hillsborough, North Carolina.
- Horton, George M (1865). Naked Genius. Revised and compiled By William H. S. Banks. Raleigh, North Carolina: Southern Field and Fireside Book Publishing House.
- Horton, George Moses (October 2017). Senchyne, Jonathan (ed.). "Individual Influence". PMLA. 132 (5): 1244–1250. doi:10.1632/pmla.2017.132.5.1244. S2CID 165982360.
- "Love Poems For My Oppressors," a 2026 song on the album "Midwestern Longing" by the band Pony Keg.

== See also ==
- History of the University of North Carolina at Chapel Hill
- Phillis Wheatley
