= T. Clarence Stone =

American businessman and politician

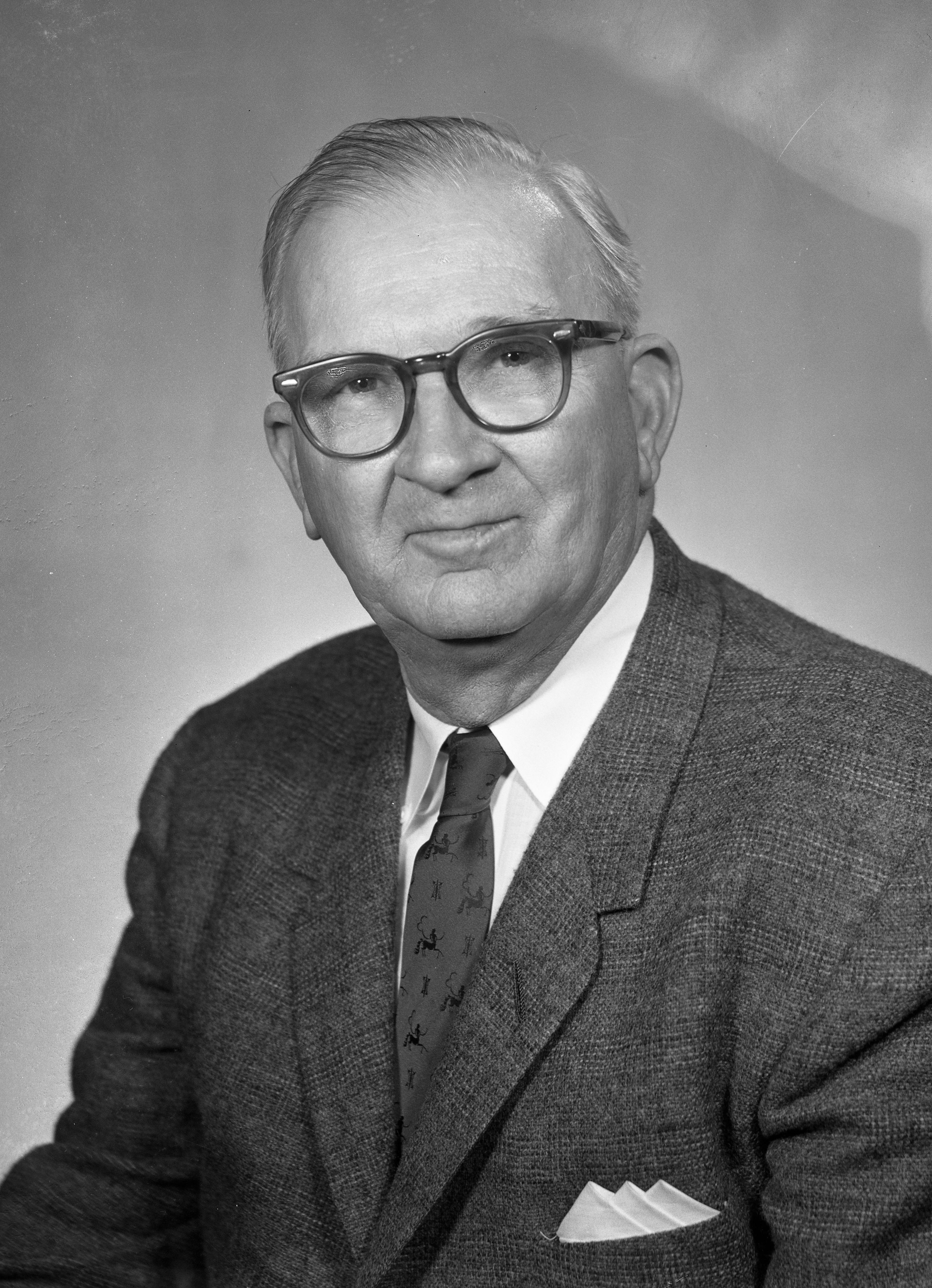
Stone circa 1963

Thomas Clarence Stone (January 19, 1899 – January 16, 1969) was an American businessman and politician.

== Early life ==
Thomas Clarence Stone was born on January 19, 1899, in Stoneville, North Carolina, United States to Robert Tyler Stone and Mary Hamlin Stone. He was a brother of William F. Stone. He graduated from Stoneville High School in 1914 and subsequently attended Davidson College, earning a Bachelor of Science degree in 1919.

Stone married Jane Kane on August 25, 1925, and had one daughter with her, Mary. His daughter was killed in a car accident in 1947, and his wife preceded him in death.

== Business career ==
Stone worked as secretary and treasurer of the Stoneville Grocery Company and the Superior Oil Company. He also owned an insurance firm.

== Political career ==
Stone first held office as a town commissioner of Stoneville before becoming its mayor. He then served seven terms in the North Carolina House of Representatives from 1935 to 1947. While there he befriended and closely collaborated with Representative John W. Umstead Jr. On July 1, 1941 he was, following appointment, sworn-in as a member of the Unemployment Compensation Commission of North Carolina. Following his daughter's death, he became a vocal proponent of highway safety legislation. He supported racial segregation.

Stone served in the North Carolina Senate in the 1955, 1957, 1961, and 1963 sessions. During the 1955 session he introduced a bill to reinstate a vehicle inspection system, but it was defeated. During the Democratic primaries of the 1960 North Carolina gubernatorial election, he supported I. Beverly Lake Sr.'s candidacy. He was elected President of the Senate on February 6, 1963 and assumed the responsibility of presiding over the body, as the office of Lieutenant Governor was vacant. He had a poor relationship with the press, and banned journalists from standing on the floor of the Senate in the North Carolina State Legislative Building, forcing them to sit in the gallery. Newspapers were particularly critical of him when he worked to have laws altered so he could assume the Lieutenant Governor's salary while presiding over the Senate.

=== Speaker Ban law ===
In 1963 members of the North Carolina General Assembly were growing increasingly agitated with civil rights demonstrations, and some were of the belief that staff and faculty at the University of North Carolina at Chapel Hill (UNC Chapel Hill) were responsible. Stone thought this was so, and was rumored to say he would have blocked funding for the university if its appropriations had not already been passed. He and other legislators and state officials laid out a plan to censure UNC Chapel Hill by passing a law that banned communists from speaking on the campuses of public universities.

On the afternoon of June 25, late in the 1963 legislative session, the Speaker Ban Bill was introduced in the House and quickly declared passed. It was then sent by special messenger over to the Senate. Representative Phil Godwin, who had introduced the measure in the House, went to the Senate and spoke with Stone and other senators while a different matter was under discussion. The bill was introduced in the Senate and, after its first reading, Stone recognized a motion for the rules of the body to be suspended so the bill could be immediately acted upon. He called for a voice vote and quickly ruled in favor of suspending the rules so a vote on the passage of the bill could be held. The North Carolina Constitution required all bills to be read three times before passage, so a second reading was made by the Senate clerk. Stone allowed for no debate on the second reading and allowed for the third reading to proceed. Afterwards Stone recognized some senators opposed to the bill to speak. When Robert B. Morgan expressed his concern that the bill had wide-ranging legal implications that members of the body would not grasp, Stone interjected, "It seems like a good 'un to me."

After Perry Martin finished his objections, Stone called for a final voice vote on the bill, despite three other legislators standing up to be recognized, and ruled that it had passed. Luther Hamilton rose afterwards to object to Stone's failure to recognize the opponents to speak, to which the President of the Senate responded by daring Hamilton to call for a vote to overrule him. This did not occur, and the bill passed.

UNC officials objected to the law, and UNC President William C. Friday went to the Sir Walter Hotel, where many legislators stayed while the General Assembly was in session, to lobby for its repeal. When Stone caught sight of Friday, he told a bystander, "You tell Friday to get out of here and to get back over there and run the university." When Friday finally caught up with Stone, the latter lectured the UNC president about the positive aspects of the bill. The Senate later held a recall vote to stop the ratification of the bill, but it failed to garner the support of the necessary two-thirds of the body. Despite objections from opponents of the measure, Stone had it ratified. Once it became law, Stone received numerous letters from the public expressing support for his actions, and refused to consider amending it. Following the 1963 session Stone declared that he would "never return" to the General Assembly and, responding to criticism of how he presided over the Senate said, "I may have made a few mistakes but I've never presided over a group before. Any mistakes I made have been ones of the head and not the heart."

== Later life ==
In 1967 the North Carolina Highway Commission named a seven-mile-long portion of North Carolina Highway 770 the T. Clarence Stone Highway. On January 6, 1969 he was admitted to the UNC Medical Center in Chapel Hill, North Carolina, suffering from hemorrhaging ulcers. He died on the morning of January 16 due to the bleeding and several complications, including pneumonia.

== Works cited ==
- Christensen, Rob (2010). The Paradox of Tar Heel Politics : The Personalities, Elections, and Events That Shaped Modern North Carolina (second ed.). Chapel Hill: The University of North Carolina Press. ISBN 978-0-8078-7151-5.
- Link, William A. (2013). William Friday: Power, Purpose, and American Higher Education (second ed.). Chapel Hill: UNC Press Books. ISBN 9781469611860.
- North Carolina Manual. Raleigh: North Carolina Secretary of State. 1961. OCLC 244106586.
