= Hollyman =

Hollyman is an English surname. Notable people with the surname include:

- Herb Hollyman (1940–1980), American football coach
- Ken Hollyman (1922–2009), Welsh footballer
- Mason Hollyman (born 2000), English cyclist
- Thomas Hollyman (1919–2009), American photojournalist

== See also ==
- Holyman (disambiguation)
- Hollman
- Holloman (surname)
