= William Brantley Aycock =

American educator

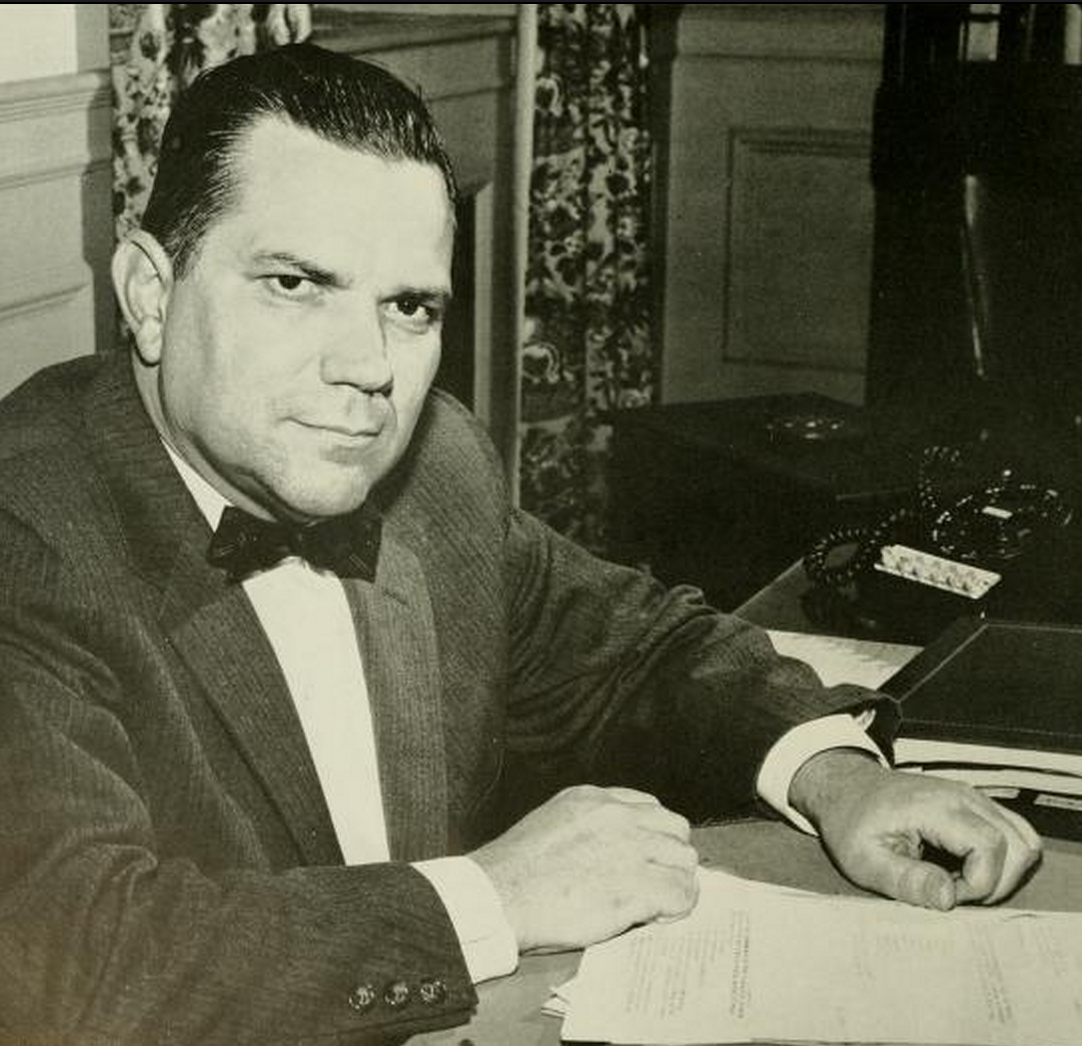
- Aycock, c. 1959

Chancellor of the University of North Carolina at Chapel Hill
- In office 1957–1964
- Preceded by: Robert Burton House
- Succeeded by: Paul Frederick Sharp

Personal details
- Born: October 24, 1915 Lucama, North Carolina, U.S.
- Died: June 20, 2015 (aged 99) Chapel Hill, North Carolina, U.S.
- Education: North Carolina State University (BS); University of North Carolina at Chapel Hill (MA)
- Profession: Educator

William Brantley Aycock (October 24, 1915 – June 20, 2015) was an American educator who served as chancellor of the University of North Carolina at Chapel Hill from 1957 until 1964 and was the retired Kenan Professor of Law at the UNC School of Law. He was born in Lucama, North Carolina in 1915.

A native of Lucama, North Carolina, Aycock served the University of North Carolina for nearly 40 years from his first faculty appointment in the School of Law in 1948 to his retirement as Kenan professor in 1985. He was named chancellor in 1957 and led the university in that capacity until 1964.

A 1948 graduate of the UNC School of Law, Aycock was first in his class and editor-in-chief of the North Carolina Law Review. He also holds a master's degree in history from UNC, and a bachelor's degree in education from North Carolina State University where he was president of the student body and a member of Phi Kappa Tau fraternity. Prior to entering law school, he served in the U.S. Army during World War II and attained the rank of colonel. He was awarded the Bronze Star, the Silver Star and the Legion of Merit.

Throughout his academic career, Aycock received many honors and awards. He was the first recipient of the UNC School of Law's McCall Teaching Award, and eventually received it a total of five times. He was an honorary member of Phi Beta Kappa and a member of the Order of the Golden Fleece. He received the Thomas Jefferson Award from UNC, the Distinguished Alumnus Award and Lifetime Achievement Award from the UNC Law Alumni Association, the William R. Davie Award from the UNC Board of Trustees, the University Award from the UNC Board of Governors, and the Liberty Bell Award from the North Carolina Bar Association.

In 1990, as a tribute to his chancellorship, the department of family medicine’s building was named for Aycock. This honor was in keeping with his long-standing interest in the field of medicine, and his support of family medicine as a way to address the health-care needs of North Carolina's rural citizens. The William B. Aycock professorship in his name was established by his many friends and is held as an endowment at the Medical Foundation of North Carolina, Inc. Aycock died after a fall on June 20, 2015, at the age of 99.

Aycock was a cousin of North Carolina Governor Charles Brantley Aycock, who was one of the principal architects in the 1898 Wilmington, North Carolina coup and massacre. William B. Aycock is best known to sports fans as the man who hired legendary basketball coach Dean Smith. He forced head coach Frank McGuire to resign after the 1960-61 season in the face of major recruiting violations. McGuire decided to leave and coach Wilt Chamberlain and the Philadelphia Warriors, before later moving to the University of South Carolina. Aycock named Smith, who had been McGuire's top assistant, as his successor. Years later, Aycock recalled that McGuire came to his office on a Saturday and told him he was resigning. Smith was waiting in McGuire's car, so Aycock called him in and offered him the job. When the 30-year-old Smith accepted the job, Aycock told him that wins and losses didn't matter as much as running a clean program that represented UNC well. This charge is somewhat ironic, as Smith led the Tar Heels to 879 wins over 36 years.
