= North Carolina Speaker Ban =

1963 law in North Carolina, United States

UNC Student Body President Paul Dickson (right) standing beside Frank Wilkinson (left) before addressing the crowd on Franklin Street

On June 26, 1963, the North Carolina General Assembly passed the Act to Regulate Visiting Speakers, later known as the Speaker Ban Law. The law forbade anyone to speak on a University of North Carolina campus who was a known member of the Communist Party, or who was known to advocate overthrow of the United States Constitution, or who had invoked the Fifth Amendment in respect of communist or "subversive" connections. The law was rushed through in the closing hours of the legislative session with virtually no debate.

To challenge the law, two speakers were invited to campus who were communists under almost any definition. When university officials refused to allow them to speak on campus, students from the university, led by student body president Paul Dickson, filed a federal lawsuit that ultimately declared the Speaker Ban Law invalid due to vagueness.

== Background ==
In the early 1960s, social unrest over segregation was increasing in parts of North Carolina, and protesters would often make themselves highly visible to the media and lawmakers. Some students and faculty members from the University of North Carolina joined in these protests and, while the university had no official involvement with these demonstrations, a link formed in the public perception.

To many members of the conservative General Assembly, it seemed that the university was stirring up unrest among blacks, and in the Cold War atmosphere of the early 1960s, communism was feared to be at the root of this challenge to authority. Some state legislators believed that if communist agitators were inciting racial unrest and spreading their message through the university, then legislation could put an end to it.

== Passage ==
In the waning hours of the 1963 General Assembly session, Rep. Phil Godwin introduced the bill, then called for a suspension of the rules to expedite its passage through the state House of Representatives. There were no committee hearings and no advance notice that the bill would be introduced, and only a few of the bill's supporters had copies of the legislation. The bill passed three readings in four minutes.

Godwin then went to the chamber of North Carolina Senate and spoke with President of the Senate T. Clarence Stone and other senators while a different matter was under discussion on the floor. The bill was introduced in the Senate and, after its first reading, Stone recognized a motion for the rules of the body to be suspended so the bill could be immediately acted upon. He called for a voice vote and quickly ruled in favor of suspending the rules so a vote on the passage of the bill could be held. The North Carolina Constitution required all bills to be read three times before passage, so a second reading was made by the Senate clerk. Stone allowed for no debate on the second reading and allowed for the third reading to proceed. Afterwards Stone recognized some senators opposed to the bill to speak. When Robert B. Morgan expressed his concern that the bill had wide-ranging legal implications that members of the body would not grasp, Stone interjected, "It seems like a good 'un to me." After Perry Martin finished his objections, Stone called for a final voice vote on the bill, despite three other legislators standing up to be recognized, and ruled that it had passed. Luther Hamilton rose afterwards to object to Stone's failure to recognize the opponents to speak, to which the President of the Senate responded by daring Hamilton to call for a vote to overrule him. This did not occur, and the bill passed.

Governor Terry Sanford was against the bill, but at that time the governor of North Carolina could not veto legislation.

== Criticism of the law ==
In addition to arguments that the Speaker Ban Law violated the First Amendment's right to freedom of speech, many commentators pointed out the difficulties in determining exactly who was a "known communist". Additionally, the law was ridiculed by pointing out that Confederates such as Robert E. Lee would have been prohibited from speaking because he advocated the overthrow of the United States government.

== Legal challenge ==
After the bill had become law, many students, faculty, and administrators actively opposed the ban, seeing it as an attack on freedom of speech. In order to challenge the law, students at the University of North Carolina at Chapel Hill led by student body president Paul Dickson invited Herbert Aptheker and Frank Wilkinson to speak on the edge of the campus. As expected, the university refused to allow either of the speakers to give their speeches on campus. Instead, they addressed the assembled crowd from across the stone wall that separates the university from the town of Chapel Hill. At the request of Godwin, North Carolina Attorney General T. Wade Bruton issued a formal advisory opinion on the law in August 1963, concluding it to be constitutional.

The university's refusal to allow the men to speak on the physical campus was used as the basis for a lawsuit filed by students against the university and the State of North Carolina. McNeill Smith, a lawyer in Greensboro and a university alumnus, took the case pro bono. The plaintiffs, along with the two speakers Aptheker and Wilkinson, were Paul Dickson, George Nicholson, Robert Powell, James Medford, Eunice Milton, John Greenbacker, Eric Van Loon, Ernest McCrary, Gary Waller, Stuart Matthews, John McSween, Henry Patterson. The North Carolina chapter of the ACLU, recently established in part because of the Speaker Ban law, supported the lawsuit. On February 19, 1968, a three-judge federal district court in Greensboro deliberated for 10 minutes before declaring the Speaker Ban Law invalid due to vagueness.

== Memorial ==
In 2011, an engraved granite marker with a bronze plaque was erected near the spot where Aptheker and Wilkinson spoke.
