= Holloman (surname) =

Family name

Holloman is a surname. Notable people with the surname include:

- Bill Holloman (born c. 1956), American saxophonist and trumpet player
- Bobo Holloman (1923–1987), American baseball player
- DeVonte Holloman (born 1991), American football player
- George V. Holloman (1902–1946), American aviator
- Laurel Holloman (born 1971), American painter and actress
- Michaé Holloman (born 1981), American beauty pageant winner
- Robert Lee Holloman (1953–2007), American politician

== See also ==
- Hollyman
