= University of North Carolina =

Public university system in North Carolina

Coordinates: 35°54′31″N 79°2′57″W

- Type: Public university system
- Established: 1789 (Chapel Hill); 1972 (current structure)
- President: Peter Hans
- Governing body: UNC Board of Governors
- Faculty: 13,564 (2008 fall)
- Administrative staff: 30,664 (2008 fall)
- Students: 244,507 (2021 fall)
- Undergraduates: 191,517 (2021 fall)
- Postgraduates: 52,990 (2021 fall)
- Location: Chapel Hill, North Carolina, United States
- Campus: 17 campuses
- Website: northcarolina.edu

University of North Carolina System locations
- Durham – NC Central and NCSSM-Durham
- Greensboro – UNC Greensboro and NC A&T
- Winston-Salem – WSSU and UNCSA

The University of North Carolina is the public university system for the state of North Carolina. Overseeing the state's 16 public universities and the public high school North Carolina School of Science and Mathematics, it is commonly referred to as the UNC System to differentiate it from its first campus, UNC-Chapel Hill.

The university system has a total enrollment of 256,530 students as of fall 2025. UNC campuses conferred 62,930 degrees in 2020–2021, the bulk of which were at the bachelor's level, with 44,309 degrees awarded. In 2008, the UNC System conferred over 75% of all baccalaureate degrees in North Carolina.

== History ==
=== Foundations ===
Founded in 1789, the University of North Carolina at Chapel Hill (at the time called the University of North Carolina) is one of three schools to claim the title of oldest public university in the United States. It closed from 1871 to 1875, faced with serious financial and enrollment problems during the Reconstruction era. In 1877, the state of North Carolina began sponsoring additional higher education institutions. Over time, the state added a women's college (now known as the University of North Carolina at Greensboro), a land-grant university (North Carolina State University), five historically black institutions (North Carolina A&T State University, North Carolina Central University, Winston-Salem State University, Fayetteville State University, and Elizabeth City State University) and one to educate American Indians (the University of North Carolina at Pembroke). Others were created to prepare teachers for public education and to instruct performing artists.

=== Initial Consolidation ===
During the Great Depression, the North Carolina General Assembly searched for cost savings within state government. Towards this effort in 1931, it redefined the University of North Carolina, which at the time referred exclusively to the University of North Carolina at Chapel Hill; the new Consolidated University of North Carolina was created to include the existing campuses of University of North Carolina at Chapel Hill, North Carolina State College (now North Carolina State University), and the Woman's College (now the University of North Carolina at Greensboro). The three campuses came under the leadership of a single board of trustees and a single president, with "Deans of Administration" serving as day-to-day leaders of the three campuses. In 1945, the title "Dean of Administration" was changed to "Chancellor". By 1969, three additional campuses had joined the Consolidated University through legislative action: the University of North Carolina at Charlotte, the University of North Carolina at Asheville, and the University of North Carolina at Wilmington.

=== 1971 to present ===
In 1971, North Carolina passed legislation bringing into the University of North Carolina all 16 public institutions that confer bachelor's degrees. This latest round of consolidation gave each constituent school its own chancellor and board of trustees. In 1985, the North Carolina School of Science and Mathematics, the nation's first public residential high school for gifted students, was declared an affiliated school of the university. In 2007, the high school became a full member of the university.

Beginning with the 2026-27 academic year, the UNC system lowered its minimum ACT score for admission from 19 to 17.

=== Presidents ===
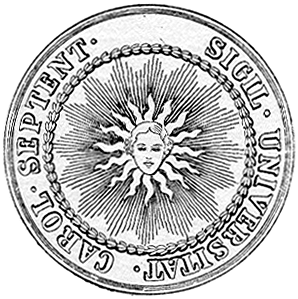
Original seal of the University of North Carolina c. 1791

Until 1931, the president (under various titles) was chief executive of the original campus in Chapel Hill. Since 1931, the president has headed the UNC system.

Number	Name	Term
1	Joseph Caldwell	1804–1812
2	Robert Hett Chapman	1812–1816
-	Joseph Caldwell	1816–1835
*	Elisha Mitchell*	1835
3	David Lowry Swain	1835–1868
4	Solomon Pool	1869–1872
**	Charles Phillips**	1875–1876
5	Kemp Plummer Battle	1876–1891
6	George Tayloe Winston	1891–1896
7	Edwin Anderson Alderman	1896–1900
8	Francis Preston Venable	1900–1914
9	Edward Kidder Graham	1914–1918
*	Marvin Hendrix Stacy*	1918–1919
10	Harry Woodburn Chase	1919–1930
11	Frank Porter Graham	1930–1949 (UNC Consolidation in 1931)
*	William Donald Carmichael, Jr. *	1949–1950
12	Gordon Gray	1950–1955
*	J. Harris Purks*	1955–1956
13	William Clyde Friday	1956–1986 (acting until 1957)
14	Clemmie Spangler	1986–1997
15	Molly Corbett Broad	1997–2006
16	Erskine Bowles	2006–2011
17	Thomas W. Ross	2011–2016
*	Junius J. Gonzales*	2016
18	Margaret Spellings	2016–2019
*	William L. Roper*	2019–2020
19	Peter Hans	2020–present

An asterisk (*) denotes acting president. Two asterisks (**) denotes chairman of the faculty.

== Legal mandate ==
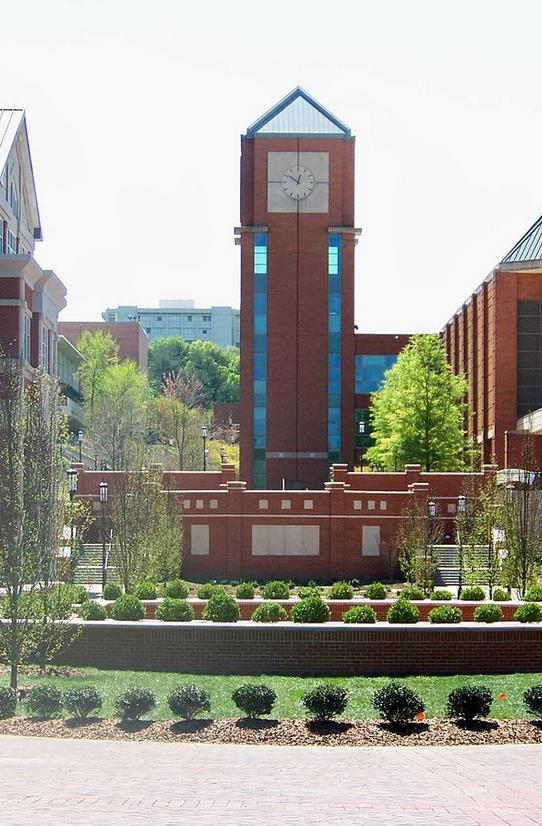
UNC Charlotte. The university expanded significantly in the 1960s and 1970s.

The legal authority and mandate for the University of North Carolina is contained in the State's first Constitution (1776), which provided in Article XLI

That a school or schools shall be established by the Legislature, for the convenient instruction of youth, ... and all useful learning shall be duly encouraged, and promoted, in one or more universities,

The state legislature granted a charter and funding for the university in 1789.

Article IX of the 1971 North Carolina Constitution deals with all forms of public education in the state. Sections 8 and 9 of that article address higher education.

- Sec. 8. Higher education.

The General Assembly shall maintain a public system of higher education, comprising The University of North Carolina and such other institutions of higher education as the General Assembly may deem wise. The General Assembly shall provide for the selection of trustees of The University of North Carolina and of the other institutions of higher education, in whom shall be vested all the privileges, rights, franchises, and endowments heretofore granted to or conferred upon the trustees of these institutions. The General Assembly may enact laws necessary and expedient for the maintenance and management of The University of North Carolina and the other public institutions of higher education.

- Sec. 9. Benefits of public institutions of higher education.

The General Assembly shall provide that the benefits of The University of North Carolina and other public institutions of higher education, as far as practicable, be extended to the people of the State free of expense.

Statutory provisions stipulate the current function and cost to students of the University of North Carolina.

== Institutions ==
Within its seventeen campuses, UNC houses two medical schools and one teaching hospital, ten nursing programs, two schools of dentistry, one veterinary school and hospital, and a school of pharmacy, as well as a two law schools, 15 schools of education, three schools of engineering, and a school for performing artists. The oldest university, the University of North Carolina at Chapel Hill, first admitted students in 1795. The smallest and newest member is the North Carolina School of Science and Mathematics, a residential two-year high school, founded in 1980 and a full member of the university since 2007. The largest is North Carolina State University, with 37,323 students as of fall 2023.

While the official names of each campus are determined by the North Carolina General Assembly, abbreviations are determined by the individual school.

Official name (previous name)	Official abbrev.	Location	Enrollment As of fall 2023	Carnegie Classification	Founded	Athletics (affiliation)	Joined system	Refs
Appalachian State University (Appalachian State Teacher's College, until 1967)	ASU, App State (for athletics)	Boone, Watauga County	21,253	master's university	1899	Mountaineers (NCAA D-I, Sun Belt)	1972	
East Carolina University (East Carolina College, until 1967)	ECU, East Carolina (for athletics)	Greenville, Pitt County	26,785	doctoral/research university	1907	Pirates (NCAA D-I, American)	1972	
Elizabeth City State University (Elizabeth City State College, until 1969)	ECSU	Elizabeth City, Pasquotank County	2,165	baccalaureate college	1891	Vikings (NCAA D-II, CIAA)	1972	
Fayetteville State University (Fayetteville State College, until 1969)	FSU	Fayetteville, Cumberland County	6,847	master's university	1867	Broncos (NCAA D-II, CIAA)	1972	
North Carolina A&T State University (The Agricultural and Technical College of North Carolina, until 1969)	NC A&T	Greensboro, Guilford County	13,885	doctoral/research university	1891	Aggies (NCAA D-I, CAA)	1972	
North Carolina Central University (North Carolina College at Durham, until 1969)	NCCU, NC Central (for athletics)	Durham, Durham County	7,965	master's university	1909	Eagles (NCAA D-I, MEAC)	1972	
North Carolina State University (North Carolina State College of Agriculture and Engineering, until 1963)	NCSU, NC State or State (for athletics)	Raleigh, Wake County	37,323	doctoral/research university	1887	Wolfpack (NCAA D-I, ACC)	1932	
University of North Carolina at Asheville (Asheville-Biltmore College until 1969)	UNCA or Asheville	Asheville, Buncombe County	2,925	baccalaureate college	1927	Bulldogs (NCAA D-I, Big South)	1969	
University of North Carolina at Chapel Hill (University of North Carolina, until 1963)	UNC-Chapel Hill, UNC-CH, North Carolina, or Carolina (for athletics)	Chapel Hill, Orange County	32,234	doctoral/research university	1789	Tar Heels (NCAA D-I, ACC)	1932	
University of North Carolina at Charlotte (Charlotte College, until 1965)	UNC Charlotte, Charlotte (for athletics)	Charlotte, Mecklenburg County	30,298	doctoral/research university	1946	49ers (NCAA D-I, American)	1965	
University of North Carolina at Greensboro (The Woman's College of the University of North Carolina, until 1963)	UNCG	Greensboro, Guilford County	17,743	doctoral/research university	1891	Spartans (NCAA D-I, SoCon)	1932	
University of North Carolina at Pembroke (Pembroke State University, until 1996)	UNCP	Pembroke, Robeson County	7,630	master's university	1887	Braves (NCAA D-II, Carolinas)	1972	
University of North Carolina Wilmington (Wilmington College, until 1969)	UNCW	Wilmington, New Hanover County	17,987	doctoral/research university	1947	Seahawks (NCAA D-I, CAA)	1969	
University of North Carolina School of the Arts (North Carolina School of the Arts, until 2008)	UNCSA	Winston-Salem, Forsyth County	1,074	special-focus institution	1963	The Fighting Pickle (N/A)	1972	
Western Carolina University (Western Carolina College, until 1967)	WCU, Western Carolina (for athletics)	Cullowhee, Jackson County	11,628	master's university	1889	Catamounts (NCAA D-I, SoCon)	1972	
Winston-Salem State University (Winston-Salem Teacher's College, until 1969)	WSSU	Winston-Salem, Forsyth County	4,776	baccalaureate college	1892	Rams (NCAA D-II, CIAA)	1972	
North Carolina School of Science and Mathematics	NCSSM	Durham, Durham County Morganton, Burke County	680 300	residential high school	1980 2022	Unicorns (NCHSAA) Dragons (NCHSAA)	2007	

=== Notes ===
The enrollment numbers are the official headcounts (including all full-time and part-time, undergrad and postgrad students) from University of North Carolina website. This does not include the North Carolina School of Science and Mathematics; the figure for NCSSM is taken from its own website.

The following universities became four-year institutions after their founding (date each became a four-year institution in parentheses):

- East Carolina University (1920)
- North Carolina Central University (1925)
- Winston-Salem State University (1925)
- Western Carolina University (1929)
- Appalachian State University (1929)
- Elizabeth City State University (1937)
- University of North Carolina at Pembroke (1939)
- Fayetteville State University (1939)
- University of North Carolina at Asheville (1963)
- University of North Carolina at Charlotte (1963)
- University of North Carolina at Wilmington (1963)

With the exception of the University of North Carolina at Pembroke and the University of North Carolina School of the Arts, the institutions that joined the University of North Carolina in 1972 did so under their current name. As of 1972, all public four-year institutions in North Carolina are members of the university.

== Affiliates ==
Name	Location	Founded
North Carolina Arboretum	Asheville, Buncombe County	1989
North Carolina Center for International Understanding	Raleigh, Wake County	
North Carolina Center for Nursing	Raleigh, Wake County	
North Carolina State Approving Agency	Raleigh, Wake County	
North Carolina State Education Assistance Authority	Raleigh, Wake County	
UNC Center for Public Media (PBS NC)	Research Triangle Park, Durham County	1955
UNC Faculty Assembly	Chapel Hill, Orange County	
University of North Carolina Press	Chapel Hill, Orange County	1922
UNC Staff Assembly	Chapel Hill, Orange County	

== See also ==
- List of colleges and universities in North Carolina
- North Carolina Community College System
