= David Ker =

American professor and judge (1758–1805)

The Reverend David Ker
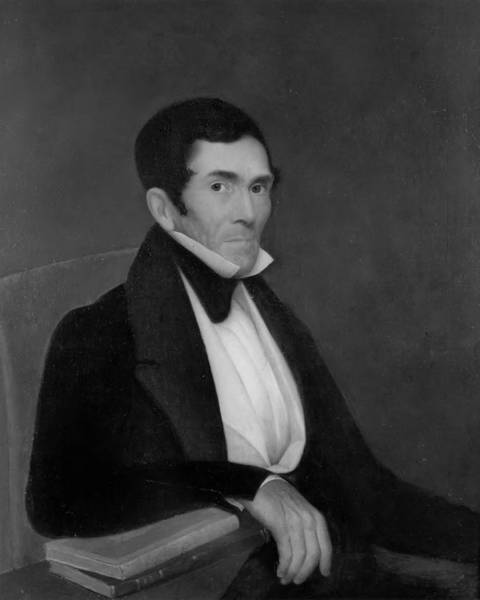

1st Presiding Professor of the University of North Carolina
- In office 1794–1796
- Succeeded by: Charles Wilson Harris

Justice of the Supreme Court of the Mississippi Territory
- In office 1802–1805
- Appointed by: Thomas Jefferson
- Preceded by: Daniel Tilton

Personal details
- Born: February 1758 Downpatrick, Ireland
- Died: January 21, 1805 (aged 46) Natchez, Mississippi Territory
- Party: Democratic-Republican
- Spouse: Mary Boggs Ker
- Children: David; John; Sarah; Eliza; Martha
- Education: Trinity College Dublin
- Profession: Educator, Religious Minister

David Ker (February 1758 – January 21, 1805), was an Irish-born American Presbyterian minister, educator, lawyer and judge. He was the first presiding professor (equivalent of a modern-day university president) of the University of North Carolina.

== Early life ==
David Ker was born in February 1758 in Downpatrick, Ireland. He was of Scottish ancestry. He graduated from Trinity College in Dublin.

Ker became a Presbyterian minister with the Temple Patrick Presbytery and married Mary Boggs. Ker emigrated with his family to the United States in the 1780s and was recorded in Orange County, North Carolina, by 1789, when their son was born there.

== Career ==
In 1791, Ker served as a Presbyterian minister in Fayetteville, North Carolina. He was a schoolteacher on weekdays and gave sermons in the courthouse on Sundays.

Ker moved to Chapel Hill, North Carolina, in 1794, where he conducted the high school prior to being chosen as the first presiding professor (the position is now known as president) of the University of North Carolina. At the university, Ker was the professor of languages. He was one of the earliest donors to the University of North Carolina library, and donated three volumes. He resigned two years after taking the position, in 1796, after arguing with the trustees and students. William S. Powell wrote that the trustees had tried to demote him to Professor of Languages, but he refused. After it became evident that they wouldn't budge, he decided to leave. Kemp P. Battle's History of the University of North Carolina: From its Beginning to the Death of President Swain, 1789–1868 mentions that after eighteen months of being president, Ker resigned after he "went off into infidelity and wild democracy", and made "two sets of enemies in the Board of Trustees, Christians and Federalists". Charles Wilson Harris, who succeeded him as presiding professor, said that Ker was "a man of talent" and "a furious Republican".

Ker moved to Lumberton, North Carolina. He served as the first president of an academy founded by John Willis, a Brigadier General in the American Revolutionary War who owned a large plantation in Lumberton, in the 1790s. Meanwhile, he passed the bar exam.

Ker moved to Natchez, Mississippi Territory with John Willis in 1800. He established the first public school for women in the Mississippi Territory. His wife and daughters taught at the school. Shortly after, he was appointed to the clerkship of the Superior Court of Adams County, Mississippi Territory, by governor W. C. C. Claiborne, and soon after made Sheriff of the County. Two years later, in 1802, he was made a judge of the Supreme Court of the Mississippi Territory by President Thomas Jefferson, replacing Judge Daniel Tilton, after being recommended by then-Senator David Stone.

== Personal life ==
Ker married Mary Boggs, who was born in Ireland. They had five children:

- David Ker. He died unmarried at the age of twenty-three. A David Ker was sheriff of Adams County, Mississippi Territory in 1802.
- John Ker. He married Mary Baker, the daughter of Joshua Baker, the 22nd Governor of Louisiana, and became a surgeon, planter and politician.
- Sarah Ker. She married Mr Cowden.
- Eliza Ker. She married Rush Nutt who owned Laurel Hill Plantation.
- Martha Ker. She married William Terry.

== Death and legacy ==
Ker died while serving as judge of the Mississippi Territory on January 21, 1805, in Natchez, Mississippi Territory. His widow burned many of his papers after his death, fearing they might inappropriately influence others. Ker's portrait is preserved at the Southern Historical Collection of the University of North Carolina at Chapel Hill.

== See also ==
- List of Mississippi Territory judges

Academic offices
Preceded by None	1st Presiding Professor of the University of North Carolina; 1794–1796	Succeeded by Charles Wilson Harris
Legal offices
Preceded by Daniel Tilton	Judge of the Supreme Court of the Mississippi Territory; 1802–1805	Unknown
