= Zener–Hollomon parameter =

In materials science, the Zener–Hollomon parameter, typically denoted as Z, is used to relate changes in temperature or strain-rate to the stress-strain behavior of a material. It has been most extensively applied to the forming of steels at increased temperature, when creep is active. It is given by

$$Z= \dot {\varepsilon} \exp(Q/RT)$$

where $\dot {\varepsilon}$ is the strain rate, Q is the activation energy, R is the gas constant, and T is the temperature. The Zener–Hollomon parameter is also known as the temperature compensated strain rate, since the two are inversely proportional in the definition. It is named after Clarence Zener and John Herbert Hollomon, Jr. who established the formula based on the stress-strain behavior in steel.

When plastically deforming a material, the flow stress depends heavily on both the strain-rate and temperature. During forming processes, Z may help determine appropriate changes in strain-rate or temperature when the other variable is altered, in order to keep material flowing properly. Z has also been applied to some metals over a large range of strain rates and temperatures and shown comparable microstructures at the end-of-processing, as long as Z remained similar. This is because the relative activity of various deformation mechanisms is typically inversely proportional to temperature or strain-rate, such that decreasing strain rate or increasing temperature will increase Z and promote plastic deformation.

== See also ==
- Hollomon–Jaffe parameter
