= Joseph Caldwell =

American educator and Presbyterian minister

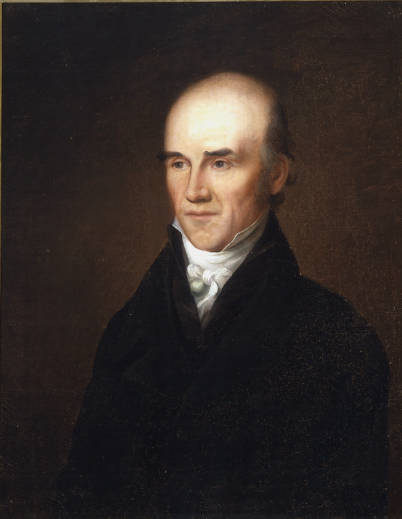
- Portrait of Caldwell.
- Born: April 21, 1773; Lamington, New Jersey, British America
- Died: January 27, 1835 (aged 61); Chapel Hill, North Carolina, U.S.
- Education: Princeton University
- Occupations: Mathematician, Educator, Religious Minister, Astronomer
- Known for: 1st President of the University of North Carolina
- Term: 1796-1797 (presiding professor); 1799-1804 (presiding professor); 1804-1812; 1816-1835
- Predecessor: Charles Wilson Harris; James Smiley Gillaspie
- Successor: James Smiley Gillaspie; Robert Hett Chapman; David Lowry Swain
- Spouses: Susan Rowan; Helen Hogg Hooper

Joseph Caldwell (April 21, 1773 – January 27, 1835) was a U.S. educator, Presbyterian minister, mathematician, and astronomer. He was the first president of the University of North Carolina at Chapel Hill, holding the office from 1804 until 1812, and from 1816 until his death in 1835.

== Early life and ministry ==
Caldwell was born in Lamington, New Jersey and graduated from the College of New Jersey (now Princeton) as Latin salutatorian in 1791. After graduation he worked as a tutor and was an assistant teacher in Elizabethtown before studying for the ministry and obtaining a license to preach from the Presbytery of New Brunswick. He was ordained in North Carolina in 1811.

On October 5, 1822, the North Carolina Synod (Presbyterian) created the Education Society of North Carolina for "the education of indigent and pious youth for the ministry of the gospel", appointing Caldwell as its president.

== Educator at the University of North Carolina ==
He became the presiding professor of mathematics at the University of North Carolina at Chapel Hill in 1797 and later became its president. After writing the textbook A Compendious System of Elementary Geometry (1822) and other academic works, Caldwell went on to write a series of letters, some under the pen name "Carlton", to advocate for a public education system and for improved transportation in North Carolina.

== Writings as "Carlton" ==
In "The Numbers of Carlton", a set of 22 essays written in 1827-1828, Caldwell presented mathematical analyses to show that a building a central railroad for North Carolina would have economic and accessibility advantages over a system of canals. These essays, distributed as pamphlets and compiled in book form (in 1828) were influential in winning public support for the railroad. Newspapers like the Raleigh Register and the Hillsborough Recorder published them weekly.

== Astronomer ==
In 1809, Caldwell was appointed as the "Astronomer" to the commission determining the boundary between North and South Carolina. When the university declined his request to fund an astronomy program, he purchased telescopes from France with his own money in 1824. When he constructed the university's astronomical observatory in 1830 in his backyard, it was the first one built solely for educational purposes in the United States.

== Legacy ==
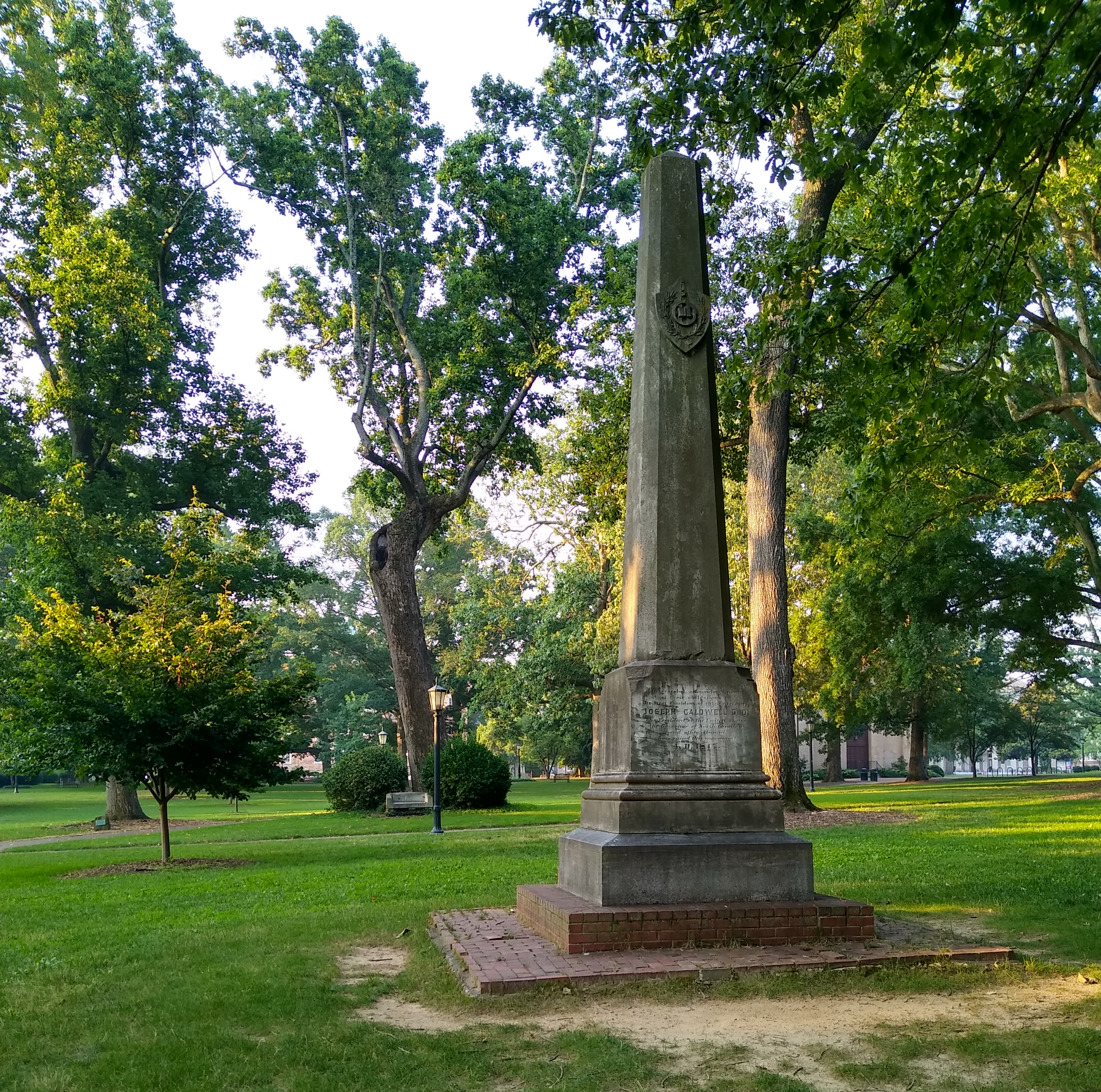
Monument to Joseph Caldwell on UNC campus, with Davie Poplar in the background

In 1841, Caldwell County in western North Carolina was named for him.

In October 2013, the University of North Carolina at Chapel Hill hosted a display to commemorate the role of Masons in the establishment of the first public university in the United States. Among items on display were the 18th and 19th-century papers from Eagle Lodge No. 19 in Hillsborough documenting the applications, or “petitions,” of Caldwell to receive the first and second degrees of Masonry.
