= Robert Hett Chapman =

American Presbyterian minister (1771-1833)

President of the University of North Carolina
- In office 1812–1816
- Preceded by: Joseph Caldwell
- Succeeded by: Joseph Caldwell

Personal details
- Born: March 15, 1771 Orangedale, New Jersey
- Died: June 18, 1833 (aged 62) Winchester, Virginia
- Spouse: Hannah Arnett
- Education: Princeton University
- Profession: Educator, Religious Minister

Robert Hett Chapman (March 15, 1771 – June 18, 1833) was a Presbyterian minister and missionary and the second president of the University of North Carolina.

== Personal life ==
Robert Hett Chapman was born second of three children of Reverend Jedediah Chapman and his wife, Blanche Smith and was born on March 15, 1771, in Orangedale (now Orange), New Jersey. He was married to Hannah Arnett in 1797, while serving as a Presbyterian minister.

== Presbyterian minister ==
Robert graduated from Nassau Hall, now known as Princeton University, in 1789 with his bachelor's degree in theology. His next step would be to get his licenses with the Presbytery in New Jersey. After this he was installed as the pastor at the Presbyterian Church in Rahway, New Jersey. Robert remained in Rahway from 1796 to 1799.

== President of the University of North Carolina ==
On December 12, 1812, was elected president by the board of trustees at the University of North Carolina, Chapel Hill. Robert contributed to UNC in many ways such as “instituting Bible study for students and helped to establish a local church” He did not stay long at UNC. He gave in his letter of resignation on November 23, 1816, and his session ended immediately but was still given half of a years severance pay and was still allowed to stay in the house he lived in on the campus.

== Later life ==
After resigning from UNC, he traveled as a minister and missionary throughout Virginia, where he was a pastor in Leesburg, Loudon and Winchester. He also traveled some in North Carolina and Tennessee. He “died unexpectedly of an intestinal ailment” in Winchester, Virginia on the June 18, 1833. At the time of his death, he was a resident of Tipton County, TN. In memory of Robert Hett Chapman there is a “framed silhouette” of him “in the North Carolina Collection, University of North Carolina, Chapel Hill”
