= Charles Wilson Harris =

American academic administrator

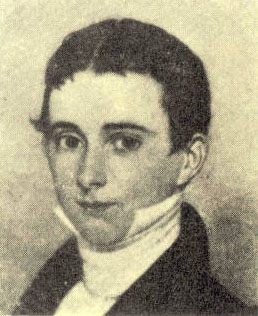

Presiding Professor of the University of North Carolina
- In office 1796–1796
- Preceded by: David Ker
- Succeeded by: Joseph Caldwell

Personal details
- Born: 1771 Concord, North Carolina
- Died: January 15, 1804 (aged 32–33) Anson County, North Carolina, United States
- Profession: Educator

Charles Wilson Harris (1771 – January 15, 1804) was an American educator and lawyer. He was briefly presiding professor (equivalent of a modern-day university president) of the University of North Carolina during 1796.

== Biography ==
=== Early life ===
Charles Wilson Harris was born in 1771. He was the son of Col. Robert Harris (1737–1803) and Mary Wilson. His maternal grandfather, Zaccheus Wilson, was a signer of the Mecklenberg Declaration. His elementary education was at a classical school conducted in association with the Poplar Tent Presbyterian Church, of which his father was a presiding elder. He attended the College of New Jersey (now Princeton University) and was awarded the Mathematical Oration at his 1792 graduation.

=== Career ===
Harris was a close associate of William Richardson Davie. He was Davie's law clerk and assumed Davie's legal caseload during the latter's absences from Halifax, North Carolina when he was governor and ambassador to France.

He served as the second presiding professor (now known as university president) of the University of North Carolina at Chapel Hill in Chapel Hill, North Carolina, in 1796.

=== Personal life ===
He was a freemason. He never married. He died of consumption on January 15, 1804, in his early thirties, in Anson County.
