= Hollomon–Jaffe parameter =

Parameter describing the effect of a heat treatment at a temperature for a certain time

The Hollomon–Jaffe parameter (HP), also generally known as the Larson–Miller parameter, describes the effect of a heat treatment at a temperature for a certain time. This parameter is especially used to describe the tempering of steels, so that it is also called tempering parameter.

== Effect ==
The effect of the heat treatment depends on its temperature and its time. The same effect can be achieved with a low temperature and a long holding time, or with a higher temperature and a short holding time.

== Formula ==
In the Hollomon–Jaffe parameter, this exchangeability of time and temperature can be described by the following formula:

$$H_p = \frac {(273.15 + T)}{1000} \cdot (C + \log(t))$$

This formula is not consistent concerning the units; the parameters must be entered in a certain manner. T is in degrees Celsius. The argument of the logarithmic function has the unit hours. C is a parameter unique to the material used. The Hollomon parameter itself is unitless and realistic numeric values vary between 15 and 21.

$$H_p = T (C + \log(t)) \,$$

where T is in millikelvin, t is in hours, and C is the same as above.

Hollomon and Jaffe determined the value of C experimentally by plotting hardness versus tempering time for a series of tempering temperatures of interest and interpolating the data to obtain the time necessary to yield a number of different hardness values. This work was based on six different heats of plain carbon steels with carbon contents varying from 0.35%–1.15%. The value of C was found to vary somewhat for different steels and decrease linearly with the carbon content of a steel grade. Hollomon and Jaffe proposed that C = 19.5 for carbon and alloy steels with carbon contents of 0.25%–0.4%; and C = 15 for tool steels with carbon contents of 0.9%–1.2%.

== See also ==
- Zener–Hollomon parameter
