= Oldest public university in the United States =

The title of oldest public university in the United States is claimed by three universities: the University of Georgia, the University of North Carolina at Chapel Hill, and the College of William and Mary. Each has a distinct basis for the claim: North Carolina being the first to hold classes and graduate students as a public institution, Georgia being the first created by state charter, and William & Mary having the oldest founding and operations dates of any current public university, but it was a private institution for over 200 years, until 1906.

== University of North Carolina at Chapel Hill ==
The Constitution of North Carolina of 1776 provided that "learning . . . be duly encouraged, and promoted, in one or more universities." The legislature chartered the University of North Carolina in 1789, and construction on the campus in Chapel Hill began in 1793. The university became the first public institution of higher learning in the U.S. to open in 1795 when it completed construction on its first building, Old East, and admitted its first students. Graduating its first class in 1798, UNC was the only public institution to confer degrees in the 18th century.

== University of Georgia ==
Located in Athens, Georgia, the University of Georgia received its charter from the state in 1785, making the University of Georgia the first state-chartered public university in the United States. As a result of this distinction, the University of Georgia brands itself as the "birthplace of the American system of higher education." A site was selected for the university, but it did not begin admitting students until 1801, six years after the University of North Carolina. The first graduation was held in 1804. The first building was completed in 1805.

== College of William & Mary ==
Now a public university, College of William & Mary in Williamsburg, Virginia, was founded by royal charter in 1693, making it the second-oldest college or university in the United States after Harvard University. The college severed formal ties with Britain after the colonies declared independence, but remained a private institution until financial troubles forced its closure after the Civil War. It re-opened in 1888, but did not become public until continued financial troubles forced it to accept funding from the Commonwealth of Virginia beginning in 1906.

== See also ==
- First university in the United States
