= Solomon Pool =

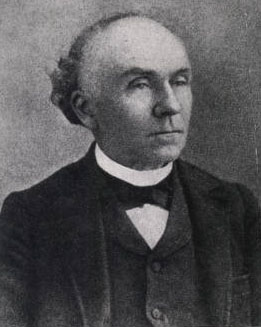

President of the University of North Carolina
- In office 1869–1872
- Preceded by: David Lowry Swain
- Succeeded by: Charles Phillips

Personal details
- Born: April 21, 1832 Elizabeth City, North Carolina
- Died: April 8, 1901 (aged 68) Greensboro, North Carolina
- Profession: Educator

Solomon Pool (April 21, 1832 – April 8, 1901) was the fourth president of the University of North Carolina. His father was a wealthy slave-holding planter of English descent, his mother was descended from French Huguenots. Pool entered the University of North Carolina in 1849 and graduated in 1853. Pool became president of the university in 1869.
