= Silent Sam =

Confederate statue in North Carolina

- The Confederate Monument; Soldiers Monument
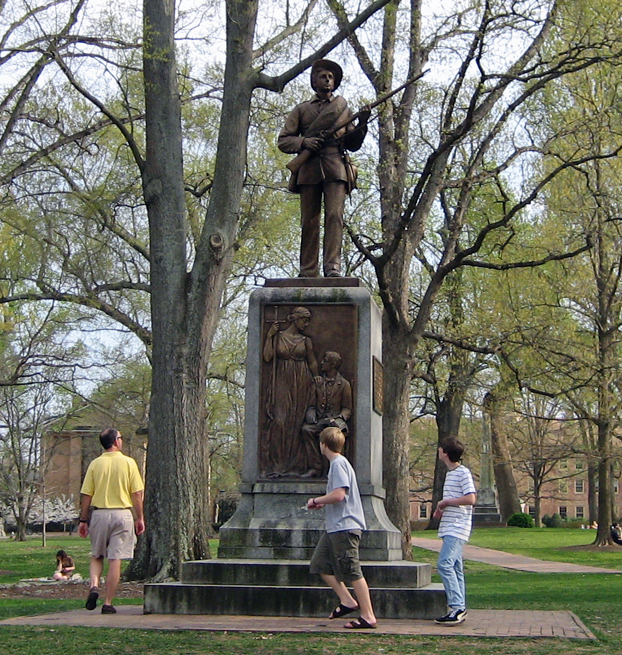
- The statue in 2007

- Location within North Carolina
- Artist: John A. Wilson
- Completion date: June 2, 1913; 113 years ago
- Medium: Bronze sculpture and plaques; Stone plinth
- Condition: Toppled by protesters, August 2018
- Location: (former) McCorkle Place, Chapel Hill, North Carolina, United States; 35°54′49.5″N 79°3′7.9″W
- Owner: University of North Carolina/Sons of Confederate Veterans (disputed)

The Confederate Monument, University of North Carolina, commonly known as Silent Sam, is a bronze statue of a Confederate soldier by Canadian sculptor John A. Wilson, which stood on McCorkle Place of the University of North Carolina at Chapel Hill (UNC) from 1913 until it was pulled down by protestors on August 20, 2018. Its former location has been described as "the front door" of the university and "a position of honor".

Establishing a Confederate monument at a Southern university became a goal of the North Carolina chapter of the United Daughters of the Confederacy (UDC) in 1907. UNC approved the group's request in 1908 and, with funding from UNC alumni, the UDC, and the university, Wilson designed the statue, using a young Boston man as his model. At the unveiling on June 2, 1913, local industrialist and UNC trustee Julian Carr gave a speech espousing white supremacy, while Governor Locke Craig, UNC President Francis Venable and members of the UDC praised the sacrifices made by students who had volunteered to fight for the Confederacy. The program for the unveiling simply referred to the statue as "the Confederate Monument", with the name "Soldiers Monument" also being used around the same time. The name Silent Sam is first recorded in 1954, in the student newspaper The Daily Tar Heel.

Beginning in the 1960s, the statue faced opposition on the grounds of its racist message, and it was vandalized several times during the civil rights movement. Protests and calls to remove the monument reached a higher profile in the 2010s, and in 2018, UNC Chancellor Carol L. Folt described the monument as detrimental to the university, and said that she would have the statue removed if not prohibited by state law. Increased protests and vandalism resulted in the university spending $390,000 (Note: equivalent to $500,033 in 2025) on security and cleaning for the statue in the 2017–18 academic year. On the day before fall classes started in August 2018, the statue was toppled by protesters, and later that night removed to a secure location by university authorities. A statement from Chancellor Folt said the statue's original location was "a cause for division and a threat to public safety," and that she was seeking input on a plan for a "safe, legal and alternative" new location.

UNC-Chapel Hill's board of trustees recommended in December 2018 that the statue be installed in a new "University History and Education Center" to be built on campus, at an estimated cost of $5.3 million, (Note: equivalent to $6.8 million in 2025) but this was rejected by the University of North Carolina Board of Governors. The pedestal base and inscription plaques were removed in January 2019, with a statement from Chancellor Folt citing public safety.

In 2019, UNC donated the statue to the Sons of Confederate Veterans (SCV) with a $2.5 million trust (Note: equivalent to $3.1 million in 2025) for its "care and preservation". However, the agreement was struck down by a judge, and the statue was returned to UNC in 2020.

As of 2024, UNC-Chapel Hill states the statue is in an undisclosed storage facility.

== Early history, 1909–1913 ==
=== Campaign ===
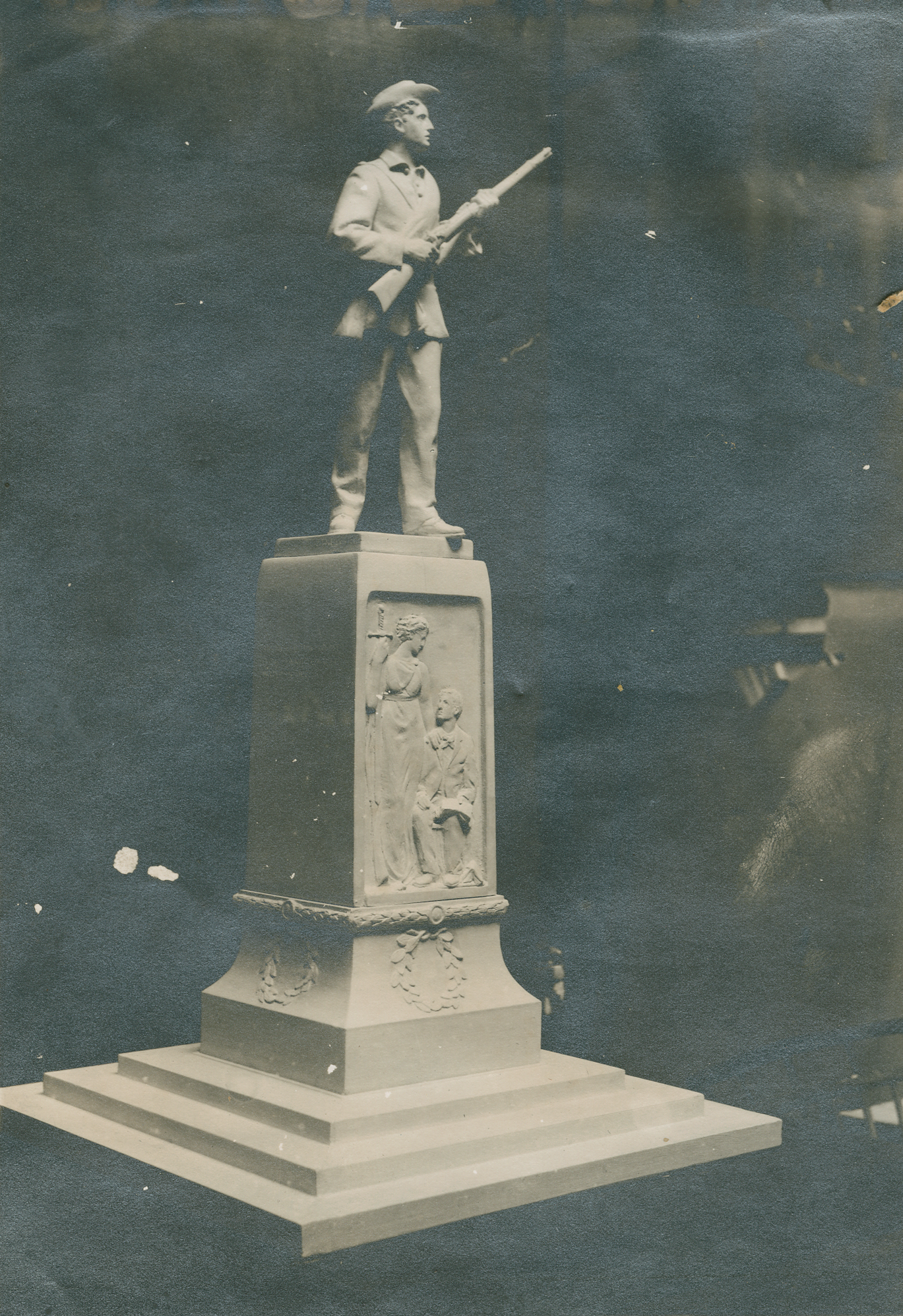
The statue in John A. Wilson's Waban Hill Road Studio, Chestnut Hill, Massachusetts

During the American Civil War, over 1,000 students and employees of the University of North Carolina at Chapel Hill (UNC) enlisted, of whom 287 are known to have lost their lives. University president David Lowry Swain had petitioned the Confederacy to exclude students in their final two years from conscription, and this was granted in 1863, but revoked a year later. Swain was able to keep the university open throughout the war by educating the few students unable to fight—those too young to enlist, exempt because of ill health, or discharged because of war injuries—though the senior class in the spring of 1865 had only one student.

In 1907, the North Carolina chapter of the United Daughters of the Confederacy (UDC) decided that its next major goal was to be "the erection, on the campus at the State University, of a monument to the students and faculty, who went out from its walls in 1861 to fight and die for the South." University President Francis Preston Venable spoke to the 1909 UDC Convention, approving of the plan for a monument, and saying that record of the students who enlisted "should ever be before the eyes of the present-day students". The request for a monument was presented to, and approved by, the UNC board of trustees on June 1, 1908.

The monument was funded by the university, alumni, and the UDC. UNC and the UDC spent until 1913 fundraising the $7,500 (Note: equivalent to $244,318 in 2025) that Canadian sculptor John Wilson charged for the statue, which he discounted from his asking price of $10,000. (Note: equivalent to $325,758 in 2025) The Daughters originally were slated to give $1,500 (Note: equivalent to $48,864 in 2025) of the cost of the statue, though their success at fundraising led the university to ask for them to cover $2,500 (Note: equivalent to $86,384 in 2025) by 1911. Most of the rest of the cost was covered by alumni donations. UNC eventually had to give $500 (Note: equivalent to $16,288 in 2025) to reach the contracted total of $7,500. The statue was planned to be in place by 1911 for the 50th anniversary of the beginning of the Civil War. Raising funds to pay for the statue delayed the project by two years.

=== Design ===
Unlike his earlier Daniel A. Bean sculpture (an unarmed 15-year-old Union Army enlistee), John A. Wilson depicted the infantryman armed with a rifle, but with no cartridge box on his belt. This has been explained as a choice to make the soldier "silent" by not providing ammunition to fire his gun. However, historian Adam H. Domby suggests that the lack of a cartridge box stemmed from Wilson's lack of knowledge about the requirements of mid-19th century weaponry, saying "In fact, he was never meant to be silent, and those who organized, funded, and dedicated the monument would be horrified at the thought that future generations would see Sam as a pacifist." As with the Bean sculpture, Wilson used a northerner, Harold Langlois of Boston, as his model. That was part of a tradition of "Silent Sentinels", statues created in the North, often mass-produced, depicting soldiers without ammunition or with their guns at parade rest. As with the other statues, the memorial was positioned to face north, towards the Union.

A bronze plaque in bas-relief on the front of the memorial's base depicted a woman, representing the state of North Carolina, convincing a young student to fight for the Southern cause as he dropped his books, representing students leaving their studies. A smaller bronze plaque on the left side of the base said:

Erected under the auspices of the North Carolina division of the United Daughters of the Confederacy aided by the alumni of the university (Note: The inscriptions are in all capital letters but are rendered here in sentence case for ease of reading.)

Another bronze plaque on the right read:

To the sons of the university who entered the War of 1861–65 in answer to the call of their country and whose lives taught the lesson of their great commander that duty is the sublimest word in the English language

"Duty is the sublimest word in the English language" is a quote from a letter attributed to Confederate commander Robert E. Lee, but revealed in 1914 to have been a forgery.

Pedestal plaques

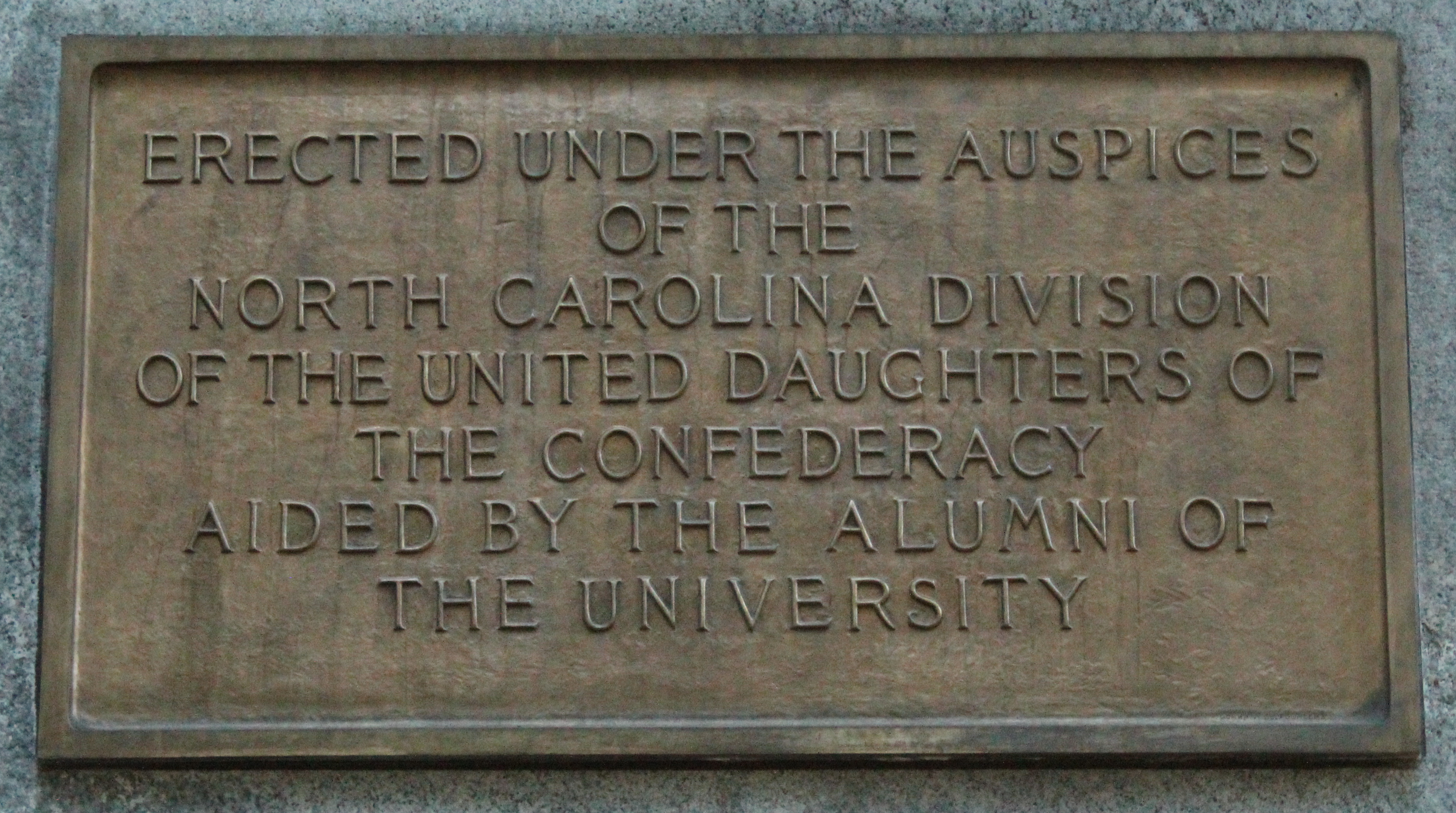
Left side

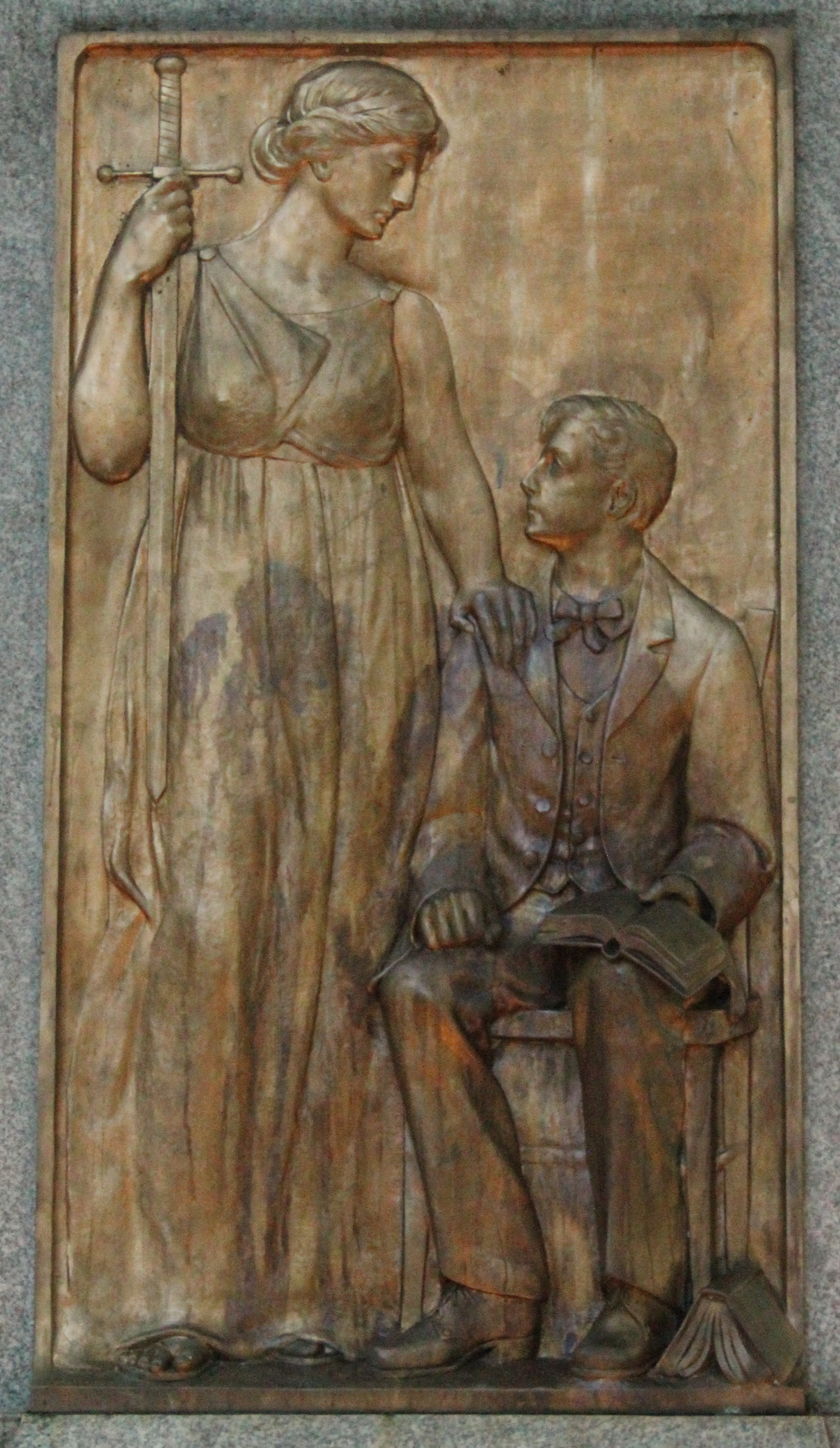
Front

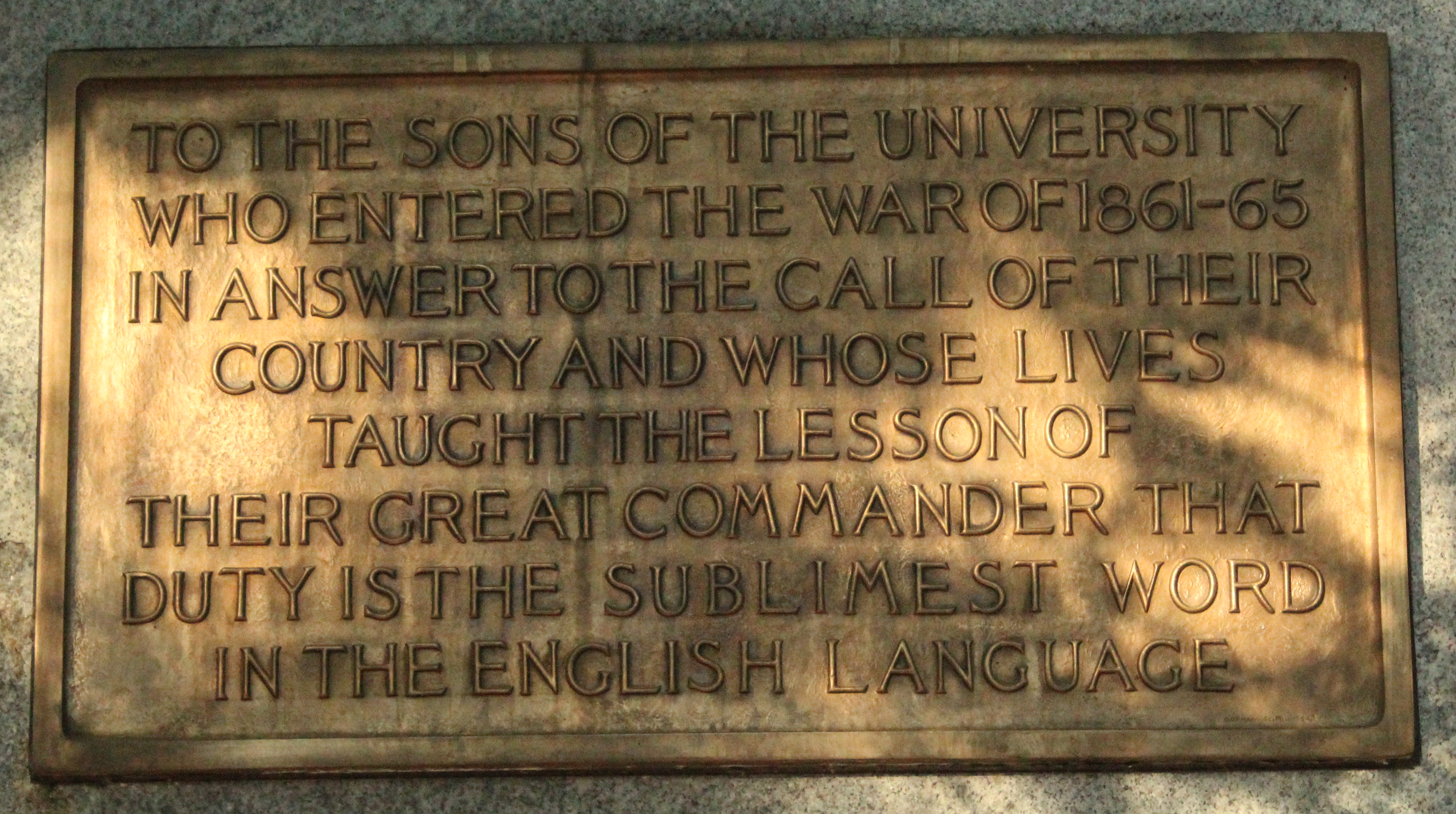
Right side

=== Dedication ===
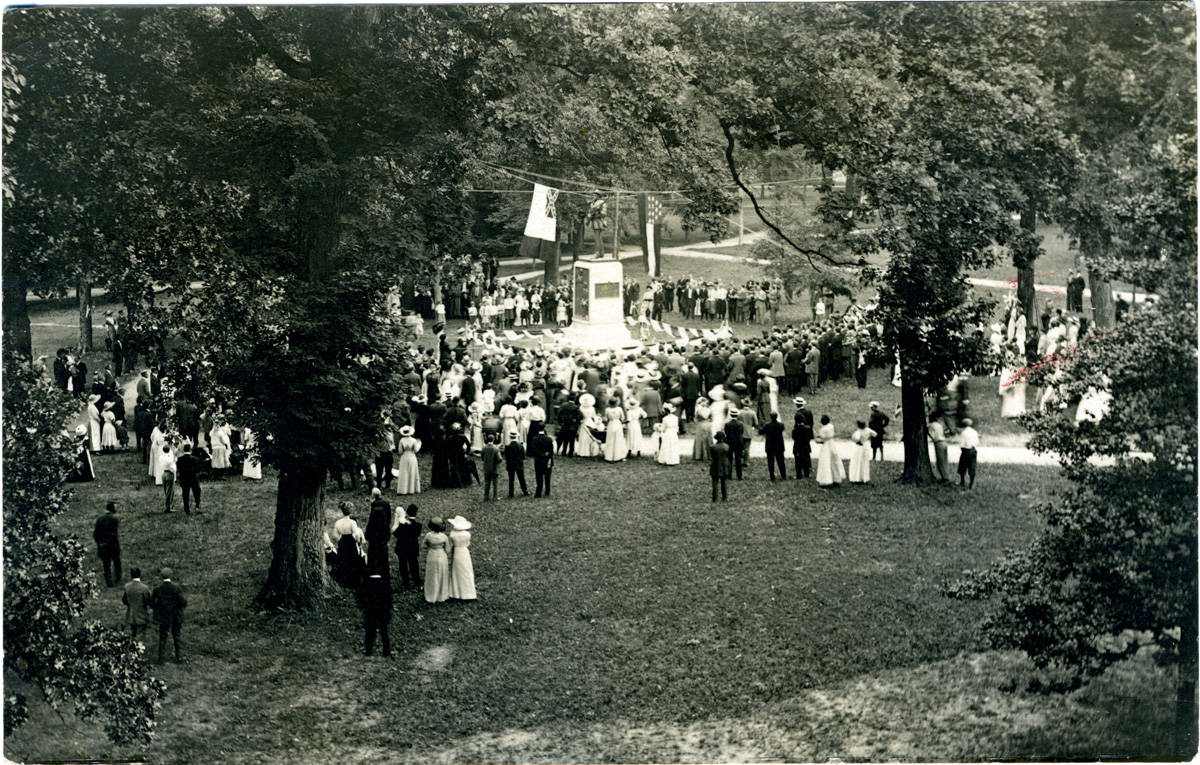
Unveiling of the monument on June 2, 1913

Ours is the task to build a State worthy of all patriotism and heroic deeds, a State that demands justice for herself and all her people, a State sounding with the music of victorious industry, a State whose awakened conscience shall lead the State to evolve from the forces of progress a new social order, with finer development for all conditions and classes of our people.

— from the dedication speech of Governor Locke Craig, June 2, 1913".

The program for the unveiling of the monument started at 3:30 pm, on June 2, 1913. Attendance was reported to be 1,000. Speeches were given by, among others, Mrs. Marshall Williams, president of the local division of the United Daughters of the Confederacy; and Francis Preston Venable, the university's president. The University Band played Dixie while "students formally accepted the monument", and the program concluded with a rendition by a quartet of "Tenting on the Old Camp Ground".

The Governor of North Carolina, Locke Craig, also spoke; regarding the service of students who died in the war:

In 1861 these students went to war. The boys who would have come here but for the war, left their homes to join the armies of Virginia and Tennessee...Nearly all the boys who left this institution to follow the flag of the Confederacy were killed or wounded in battle...The University laid upon the altar of Dixie the fairest and bravest of the world. This statue is a monument to their chivalry and devotion. It is an epic poem in bronze. Its beauty and its grandeur are not limited by the genius of the sculptor. The soul of the beholder will determine the revelation of its meaning. It will remind you, and those who come after you of the boys who left these peaceful classic shades for the hardships of armies at the front, for the fierce carnage of titanic battles, for suffering and for death. We unveil and dedicate this monument today, as a covenant that we, too, will do our task with fidelity and courage.

The dedication speech which has attracted the most subsequent notice was given by Julian Carr, a prominent industrialist, UNC alumnus and trustee, former Confederate soldier, and the largest single donor towards the construction of the monument.

This speech has been described by UNC history professor W. Fitzhugh Brundage as one in which Carr "unambiguously urged his audience to devote themselves to the maintenance of white supremacy with the same vigor that their Confederate ancestors had defended slavery." In it, Carr emphatically praised the student-soldiers and soldiers of the Confederate Army for their wartime valor and patriotism, adding that

the present generation ... scarcely takes note of what the Confederate soldier meant to the welfare of the Anglo Saxon race during the four years immediately succeeding the war ... Their courage and steadfastness saved the very life of the Anglo Saxon race in the South.

According to Brundage, Carr's phrase "the four years immediately succeeding the war" is a clear reference to the Reconstruction era, when the Ku Klux Klan, working to restore the dominance of traditional white hierarchy in the South, terrorized blacks and white Republicans. Later in the speech; Carr stated:

One hundred yards from where we stand, less than ninety days perhaps after my return from Appomattox, I horse-whipped a negro wench until her skirts hung in shreds, because upon the streets of this quiet village she had publicly insulted and maligned a Southern lady, and then rushed for protection to these University buildings where was stationed a garrison of 100 Federal soldiers. I performed the pleasing duty in the immediate presence of the entire garrison, and for thirty nights afterwards slept with a double-barrel shot gun under my head.

== 20th century ==
The monument appears on an undated, early 20th-century postcard. A picture from 1918, with two soldiers in front, appeared in the 1961 yearbook Yackity Yack.

The statue was called the "Soldiers Monument" in the first student newspaper reference to it in 1913, but was referred to as the "Confederate Monument" in the program for its unveiling, and this name was used from the 1920s through the 1940s.

The earliest known use of the name "Silent Sam" is from 1954, in the campus newspaper The Daily Tar Heel. A story developed that "Sam" would fire his gun if a virgin walked by, but never did (he was silent) because he never saw any. In 1937 this story was called an "old local wisecrack".

In 1971, the monument was defaced with paint following a basketball victory. In 1986, the statue was temporarily removed and shipped to Cincinnati, where it was cleaned and restored by bronze specialists Eleftherios and Mercene Karkadoulias. They repaired cracks, removed green oxidation, and gave the statue a protective wax coating. The refreshed statue was put back in place six months later. The cost was $8,600. (Note: equivalent to $25,260 in 2025)

== Controversies and protests ==
=== 1960–1970s ===
The monument has been a subject of controversy and a site of protest since the 1960s. In 1965, a discussion about the monument's meaning and history occurred in the letters to the editor of the UNC student newspaper, The Daily Tar Heel. In 1967, poet John Beecher "debated" Silent Sam, reading to the statue from his book of poetry To Live and Die in Dixie. Following the assassination of Martin Luther King Jr. in 1968, the monument was vandalized with orange, green, red, and yellow iridescent paint, including a hammer and sickle. In the early 1970s, the monument was the site of several demonstrations by the Black Student Movement.

=== 1990–2009 ===
Students gathered by the statue to speak out after Los Angeles police officers were found not guilty in the 1992 Rodney King trial. In 1997, a Martin Luther King Jr. Day march focusing on issues facing UNC housekeepers ended at the monument.

In 2003, Gerald Horne, at that time director of the Sonja Haynes Stone Center for Black Culture and History, in a letter to The Daily Tar Heel, called the monument "an eyesore".

=== 2010–2016 ===
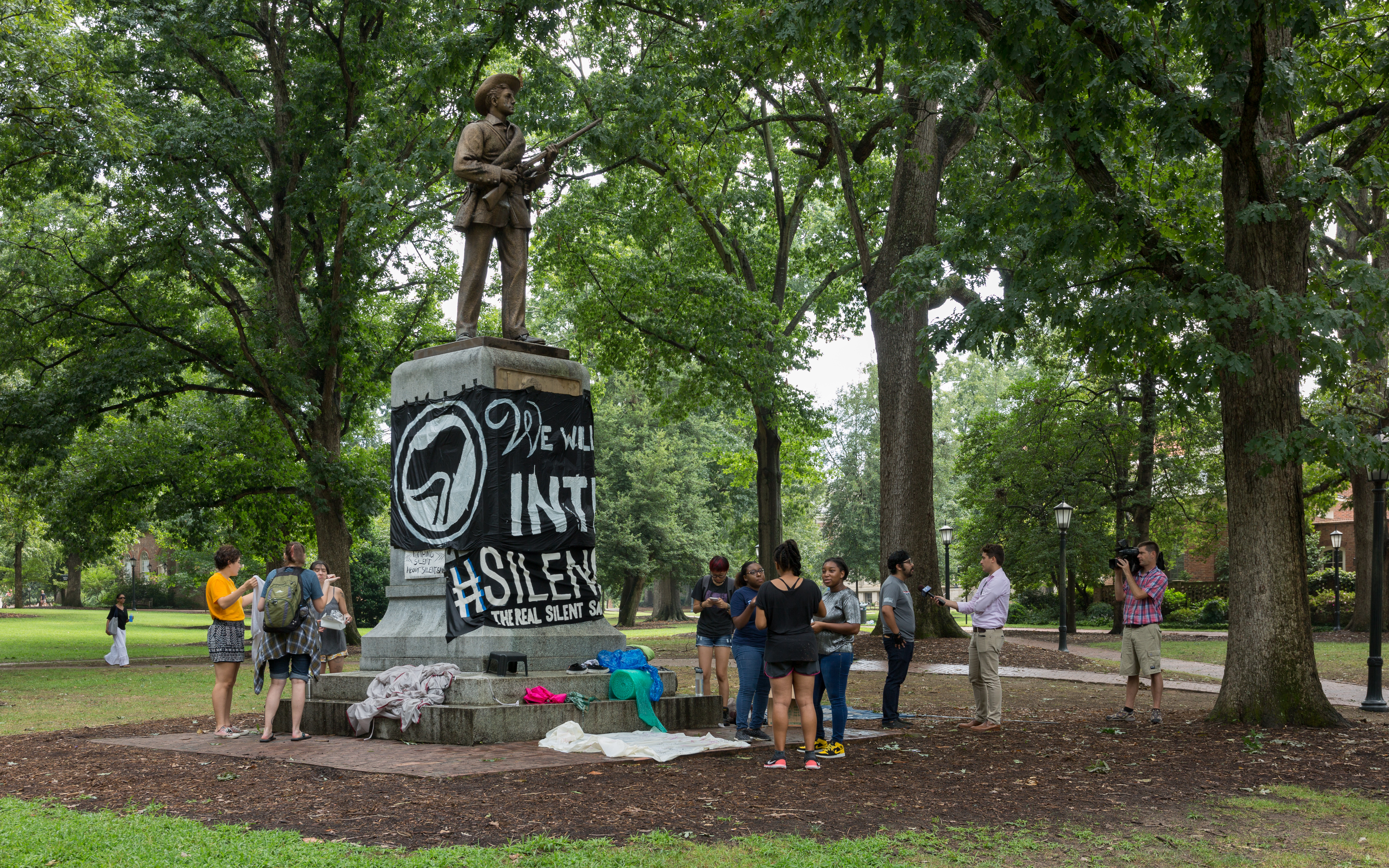
Protest against Silent Sam in August 2017

Several protests in the late 2010s were directed toward the statue, along with calls for its removal. In January 2011, Adam Domby (then a graduate student in history at UNC, later assistant professor of history at the College of Charleston), wrote a letter to The Daily Tar Heel entitled "Why Silent Sam was built: A historian's perspective". The letter highlighted Julian Carr's speech at the dedication of the statue, which Domby had uncovered in the university archives in 2009. Carr's speech, in which he praised the Confederate soldier as a defender of the "Anglo Saxon race" and bragged about whipping an African-American woman "until her skirts hung in shreds", became a galvanizing force in activists' efforts to get the statue removed.

On September 1, 2011, a group variously known as the Real Silent Sam Movement or Committee held a protest "to attract attention to the statue's history". That group "campaigned over the past two years [2011–2013] to replace the current plaque with one that tells what they call "the true history of the confederate soldier."

North Carolina NAACP President Reverend William Barber II spoke at a program held on the monument's centenary in 2013.

In July 2015, the statue was vandalized with the words "Black Lives Matter", KKK, and "murderer", during a wave of vandalism targeting Confederate monuments. A UNC history professor, Dr. Harry Watson, said that he believed the monument represented an important part of history but that its glorification promoted a false conception of the Civil War. A second protest was held on October 12, University Day, on the steps of Wilson Library.

Officials said that "a protective layer would be placed on the monument to ease cleaning efforts for future situations".

In late July 2015, the North Carolina General Assembly passed SL 2015–170, the Cultural History Artifact Management and Patriotism Act of 2015, which states that "An object of remembrance [defined as "monument, memorial, or work of art"] located on public property may not be permanently removed". It does allow an object to be permanently relocated, provided that it is "relocated to a site of similar prominence, honor, visibility, availability, and access, ...within the boundaries of the jurisdiction from which it was relocated." Approval of the North Carolina Historical Commission is required.

On the night of August 17–18, 2015, the statue, along with the Chapel Hill Post Office, were defaced with the words "Who is Sandra Bland?" On September 9, 2015, the monument was blindfolded with "a Confederate bandanna". Seeing how the monument was being defaced, a "Pro-Confederate Rally" in support of Silent Sam was announced for October 25; the protestors were from Alamance County, and had no connection with the university. They were met by three times as many counterdemonstrators, "most of them students". One of the students handed out 158 copies of W.E.B. DuBois' seminal 1903 book The Souls of Black Folk — 158 being, according to the student, the number of years between the foundation of the university and its admitting black students.

On October 12, 2015, University Day, a group of about two dozen students, calling itself The Real Silent Sam Coalition, interrupted a speech by Chancellor Folt, shouting "Tear it down, tear it down, or we'll shout you down". They received applause from some faculty present.

On January 12, 2016, UNC police arrested a man for "spray-painting a message on Silent Sam".

=== 2017–2018 ===
Already in August 2017, it was reported that Silent Sam "has been vandalized multiple times in recent years". "Silent Sam has been a target for protest and vandalism for decades." "The push to get UNC to remove the statue...took off in earnest in August 2017", after the proposed removal of Confederate statues in Charlottesville, Virginia led to the Unite the Right rally on August 11–12, and on August 14, the toppling of the Confederate Soldiers Memorial in nearby Durham. Beginning in August there was "a year of sit-ins, rallies and protests involving students, faculty and community members". On August 15, 2017, a video taken by a passer-by shows a man beating the statue with a hammer.

On August 17, 2017, Chapel Hill mayor Pam Hemminger sent a letter to the University of North Carolina at Chapel Hill, requesting that it petition the North Carolina Historical Commission to immediately remove Silent Sam from campus "in the interest of public safety." "The possibility of a breach of the peace is high, and with it the likelihood that Silent Sam could suffer substantial damage."

On August 20, 2017, protestors singing "We Shall Overcome" draped Silent Sam in black, as had just been proposed for the Charlottesville statues of Robert E. Lee and Stonewall Jackson, whose removal, at least for the moment, had recently been blocked (see Removal of Confederate monuments and memorials#Virginia).

On August 21 UNC Chancellor Carol Folt issued a message urging students not to attend the rally scheduled for the next day, "considering the potential for a highly charged atmosphere and the very real possibility for confrontation with outside groups." The rally was "being organized by groups not associated with the university... If we had the ability to immediately move the statue we would."

The same day, UNC Chancellor Folt, UNC President Margaret Spellings, UNC board-of-governors chairman Lou Bissette, and UNC trustee chairman Haywood Cochrane wrote to Governor Roy Cooper, warning of "significant safety and security threats" concerning Silent Sam: "it is only a matter of time before an attempt is made to pull down Silent Sam in much the same manner we saw in Durham ... An attempt may occur at any time." They also asked the governor to convene the North Carolina Historical Commission to take up the question of what to do with the statue," although "the panel has little leeway to remove the statue permanently." The danger was not just the physical risks of taking such a heavy object off a pedestal, it was the probable confrontations between pro- and anti-Confederate demonstrators from outside the university.

Folt stated that if UNC could remove the statue it would, but was prohibited by the 2015 law cited above. Cooper responded to Spellings, saying UNC could remove the statue if there was "a real risk to public safety," but did not himself say that the risk existed. Folt replied that despite the governor's advice, the university did not think it could say it was a "risk to public safety" in the sense intended by the 2015 law, which refers to "a building inspector or similar official" making that determination, "where the statue itself poses a physical hazard." As put on a separate occasion, "UNC...doesn't agree that it's received the green light by anyone with authority to relocate the statue." Removal would require legislative action. Folt received considerable criticism from UNC-CH students and faculty for not taking a stronger position on the removal of Silent Sam.

UNC's board of governors also criticized Folt for her request of the Governor, saying that the request "was a 'wholly unacceptable' unilateral decision by Spellings and Bissette". They said the letter to the governor should have been reviewed and approved by the entire board, instead of only the board's committee chairs. They said they would not have given their approval to send the letter to Cooper. "The letter exuded a weakness and hand wringing that does not accurately reflect the Board's opinion about how the potential of campus unrest should be treated", said the letter, which was dated August 22. According to UNC-CH officials, "any petition to the North Carolina Historical Commission requesting the removal of the statue would have to come from the UNC Board of Governors. That body has shown no public interest in doing so at this point."

UNC's board of trustees then released a statement supporting Folt, saying: "Above all, regardless of the circumstance, the chancellor has a responsibility to the people of North Carolina to uphold all state laws. With this new law, it is relatively easy for many individuals to speculate about its meaning or offer possible loopholes as ways to operate around the law. It would be unwise and imprudent for the University to take any action regarding the monument without additional legal clarity, and we would expect no less from our chancellor."

On August 22, 2017, at the beginning of the school year, a "Rally for Removal of Silent Sam", announced on a poster describing the day as "the first day of Silent Sam's last semester", attracted about 800 people. Thousands signed a change.org petition to remove it. Chanting "Hey, hey. Ho, ho. This racist statue has got to go" and "Tear it down", protestors marched to the official residence of University President Margaret Spellings, briefly blocking traffic on Franklin Street, Chapel Hill's main street, which adjoins the oldest part of the campus, where Silent Sam was located. The statue was surrounded by police in riot gear. Former UNC-CH Chancellor James Moeser, interviewed at the rally, said: "I used to be of the mind that we should contextualize history...but Charlottesville changed my mind." "Once statues like this become weaponized by the white supremacist[s] and the Nazis, keeping it up is untenable, I think it has to go. And I think it will go."

On September 6, 2017, demonstrators chanted and made noise with drums, pots and pans, birthday party horns, and "anything they could get their hands on" in front of South Building, where Chancellor Folt's office is. Their stated intent was "disrupt[ing] business as usual", and they unusuccessfully asked Chancellor Folt to listen to their reasons why they felt Silent Sam should be removed.

On September 21, the day before the North Carolina Historical Commission was to meet, UNC-CH issued a press release. It stated that the university was not making any proposal on Silent Sam to the Commission at that time. Given that the North Carolina Historical Commission had not yet made any ruling related to the 2015 law, and that Governor Cooper, through the North Carolina Department of Administration, had filed a petition to relocate three monuments located on the State Capitol grounds, "We are carefully following these proceedings, which we hope will shed light on what standards the commission will be using to evaluate such matters." (The decision, which arrived two days after Silent Sam was toppled, was negative, as the North Carolina Historical Commission found that the law did not allow them to approve the request.)

On October 26, 35 professors from the School of Law posted a statement saying:

To many in our community, the armed soldier expresses the idea that some in our community are not equal.
This disparaging and marginalizing symbol has no place at the core of an inclusive learning environment. We also believe that the message it sends undercuts the University's mission "to teach a diverse community of undergraduate, graduate, and professional students to become the next generation of leaders."
...
Maintaining this monument undercuts the value of equality protected by North Carolina law and the United States Constitution. We note that federal law obliges the University to provide an inclusive learning environment free of racial hostility
...
If the University remains uncertain of its legal ability to act, we ask it to seek a declaration in court to affirm UNC's right to remove the statue. This path would spare our students and faculty from the distraction, expense and pain of suing their home institution."

They linked the Silent Sam situation to another controversial issue, "the Board of Governors' recent ban on representation or counsel by the Center for Civil Rights."

In November 2017, Maya Little, graduate student in history and leader of Silent Sam protests during 2017–2018, posted documentation of the university's police department having used an undercover officer to gather information on the protestors, which the university confirmed. This discovery led to another rally outside South Building on November 14.

Several departments of the university issued statements on the issue:

- A November 1 statement (posted November 9) from the Department of Communication stated "We understand 'Silent Sam' to be a symbol of the history and legacies of racial slavery, anti-black racism, and white supremacy that persist in the state of North Carolina, the university, and our country.... [W]e have a moral obligation to remove this symbol of violent oppression from our midst, and continue the work of dismantling systemic racism."
- The UNC Department of Geography, in a letter reported on November 9, stated that Silent Sam "contradicts values of diversity, social justice and anti-violence that our discipline embraces.... The continued presence of the monument is damaging to all of us who share this campus, but disproportionately jeopardizes the wellbeing of students with marginalized identities."
- On November 27, the UNC School of Education posted a statement on its website, saying that the statue is and "was erected as a symbol of hatred, bigotry, and white supremacy". ... As educators, we have an obligation to continue the work of dismantling systemic racism."
- "Faculty, staff, students and graduates from the UNC School of Social Work", in a letter reported on December 15, added their support, saying "Whatever else the memorial may symbolize to some, it was erected to glorify White people in the South, and, by extension, to carry on the subjugation of Black people. Its presence continues to legitimize and incite violence, dehumanization, and oppression. Such racist symbolism is antithetical to the ethos of this vibrant, public university."

In late February 2018, an email was sent anonymously to Chancellor Folt, stating it was from 17 "senior faculty", "all Full Professors and Endowed Chaired [sic] Professors", who vowed "to move the statue themselves if the Chancellor has not done so by March 1st at midnight", saying they did not fear arrest. They claimed to be from the College of Arts and Sciences, the Medical School, the School of Public Health, and the School of Law, and quoted Edmund Burke: "the only thing necessary for the triumph of evil is for good people to do nothing". They said they would release the email to The Daily Tar Heel, the campus newspaper, if she did not reply first. On February 25 a university spokesperson confirmed the letter had been received. On the same day the email, accompanied by a press release, was sent to The Daily Tar Heel, which published them. The paper said it had met with a representative from the group, "who is a senior faculty member at UNC". In a statement on February 27, "the group said they received word...that Folt is preparing to ask Gov. Roy Cooper to petition the North Carolina Historical Commission for an urgent ruling to relocate Silent Sam", and "as a sign of good faith, understanding that the Chancellor is now seeking the quick removal of Silent Sam, we shall stand down for the present". Asked if Folt reached out or was planning to reach out to Cooper in response to the letter, Joanne Peters Denny, a UNC spokesperson, said these conversations were not happening: "We don't make our policy decisions based on threats from unauthenticated, anonymous groups".

On April 30, 2018, Maya Little defaced the statue, which she called "a symbol of UNC's commitment to white supremacy", with a mixture of red ink (some sources say paint) and her own blood. She described her action as "provid[ing] context": "This statue, Silent Sam, was built on white supremacy. It was built by white supremacists.... These statues symbolize the violence toward Black people. Without that blood on the statue, it's incomplete, in my opinion. It's not properly contextualized." The act was publicized in advance and news media and the UNC Police were present. She was arrested and charged with defacing a public statue, with a court date of August 20. She was also charged with a UNC Honor Code violation. The statue cleaning began within minutes, although at her trial, "a campus maintenance supervisor testified it took several days to remove red stains at a cost of about $4,000 (Note: equivalent to $5,129 in 2025) in supplies and labor". Faculty in the History Department issued a statement supporting her. At her trial on October 15, she admitted her guilt, but the judge withheld the verdict ("continued judgment"), so she received no sentence, and court fees and restitution were waived. A petition Little posted on change.org asking for the Honor Court charges to be dropped received 6,600 signatures.

In July 2018, Silent Sam, covered by a red X and the words "North Carolina needs a monumental change", was depicted in Raleigh on two identical billboards, on Blount Street near Hoke Street and on North Raleigh Boulevard near the intersection with Yonkers Road. They were paid for by the Make It Right Project, a project of the Independent Media Institute, which was working to have Silent Sam and nine other Confederate monuments removed. The stated audience the billboards were intended to reach — thus the Raleigh locations — were the members of the North Carolina Historical Commission. At about the same time, the Project printed posters with a picture of Silent Sam, an X over him, and the words "We need REAL heroes", and students put them up on the campus.

In a press release dated August 15, the North Carolina Historical Commission stated that it "has received requests from private individuals to relocate the 'Silent Sam' monument at the University of North Carolina at Chapel Hill, but has not received a petition from the university, the UNC system, or its governing body, the Board of Governors."

UNC had begun developing alternate signs and an interactive tour meant to place Silent Sam in context and tell the true history of UNC. From July 1, 2017, through June 30, 2018, UNC spent $390,000 on security for the monument. Of that, $3,000 (Note: equivalent to $3,846 in 2025) was for cleaning the monument. The $387,000 remainder (Note: equivalent to $496,187 in 2025) was spent on law enforcement personnel costs. Silent Sam was under 24-hour video surveillance via a monitor in the campus Police Department.

== Toppling ==
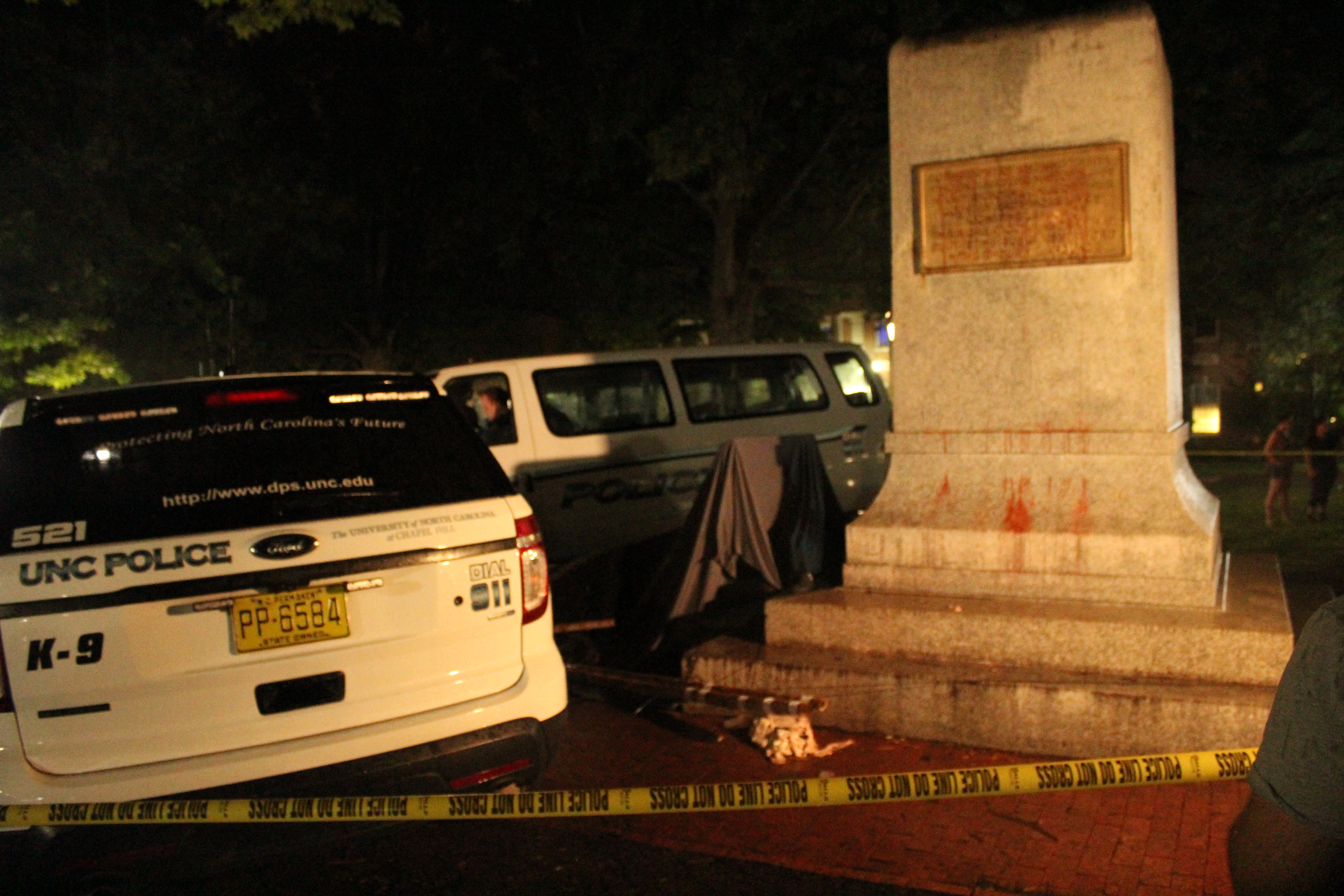
Silent Sam, center, draped in a black cloth

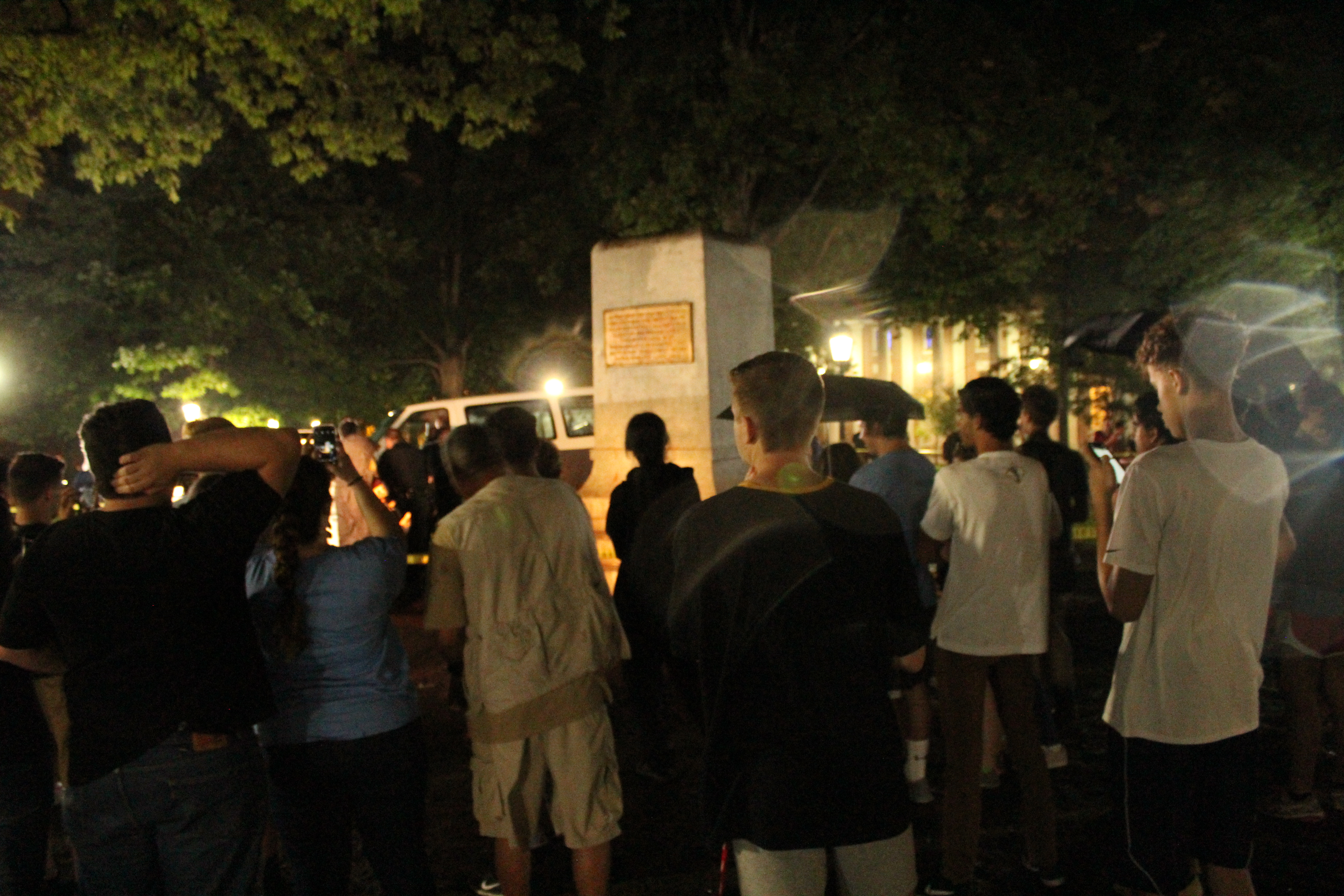
The base of Silent Sam on the night of August 20, 2018

I watched it groan and shiver and come asunder. I mean, it feels biblical. It's thundering and starting to rain. It's almost like heaven is trying to wash away the soiled contaminated remains.

— Dwayne Dixon, a UNC-CH professor

On the night of August 20, 2018, the day before the 2018–19 academic year began, another "Remove Silent Sam" rally was held, beginning with speakers at 7 p.m. The protest had been billed as a rally in support of graduate student Maya Little, whose original court appearance for defacing the monument was scheduled for that day. Protestors marched down and briefly blocked Franklin Street, Chapel Hill's main downtown street. In contrast with the 2017 rally, police stayed in the background, and video of the protest was reported as showing police moving away from the monument shortly before protesters pulled it down.

In a speech at the protest, Little said, "It's time to tear down Silent Sam. It's time to tear down UNC's institutional white supremacy".

Large signs with such inscriptions as "The whole world is watching", "Which side are you on?", "For a world without white supremacy", and a list of victims of racial violence (beginning with "Unnamed Black woman beaten by Julian Carr") were held around the monument, blocking it from view while heavy ropes were tied to it. A later report referred to "torches" as well. WUNC Managing Editor Dave DeWitt, who was present, called it "a well-planned and executed effort".

At 9:20 p.m., Silent Sam was felled; the crowd cheered. "People [were] screaming and jumping in disbelief." A newscaster on the scene described the mood as "jubilation". Holding signs and chanting "stand up, fight back" and "This is what democracy looks like", some protesters stamped on the statue or tried to cover it with dirt.

Police, who cordoned off the area around the pedestal, arrested one person who concealed their face in the public protest (prohibited in North Carolina). Some police are reported to have been smiling. Crowds remained around the base, and the Associated Press reported that students were drawn to see it as the news of the toppling spread.

Later that night, campus staff loaded the statue, which did not seem to be seriously damaged, onto a flat-bed dump truck and removed it from the site.

== Aftermath ==
On August 25 and 30 and on September 8, follow-up demonstrations were held at the site by supporters and critics of the toppling of the statue. The August 30 demonstration was convened as a "Silent Sam Twilight Service" by Alamance County Taking Back Alamance County (ACTBAC). ACTBAC was designated a hate group by the Southern Poverty Law Center. (See Flaggers.) Chancellor Folt asked people not to come to these events for safety reasons. Some of these protests led to arrests for assault, resisting arrest, and inciting a public disturbance. Supporters of Silent Sam were greatly outnumbered by counter-protesters.

=== University response ===
The morning after the toppling, UNC issued a statement on Twitter which read:

Last night's actions were unlawful and dangerous, and we are very fortunate that no one was injured. The police are investigating the vandalism and assessing the full extent of the damage.

A later statement from Chancellor Folt, UNC President Margaret Spellings, and other university leaders said, "Last night's rally was unlike any previous event on our campus. This protest was carried out in a highly organized manner and included a number of people unaffiliated with the University. While we respect that protesters have the right to demonstrate, they do not have the right to damage state property."

The State Bureau of Investigation agreed to help UNC police with their investigation into the toppling. The chair of the UNC board of governors, Harry Smith, said on August 22, 2018, that the board would engage an outside firm to investigate the actions of the university and police at the protest, adding that Chancellor Folt had not herself ordered police to take a hands-off approach.

On University Day, October 12, 2018, Chancellor Folt issued an apology for the university's connections to slavery, saying: "I reaffirm our university's commitment to facing squarely and working to right the wrongs of history so they are never again inflicted".

In November 2020, a tree was planted at the site of the statue.

=== Legality ===
As of September 7, 2018, only one person had been charged with the actual toppling of Silent Sam. At least 25 others had been arrested on charges of misdemeanor riot, misdemeanor defacing of a public monument, causing damage to property, causing a public disturbance, defacing a public building, concealing one's face, resisting arrest, simple assault, and affray (fighting). At a hearing on September 20, one person's charge was dropped, and that of another person was to be dropped following completion of community service.

=== Scrutiny of UNC Police ===
During 2017–2018, the UNC Police Department used an undercover police officer to gain information on the activities of campaigners against Silent Sam. This was discovered on November 2, 2017 when students saw the former "auto mechanic" in police uniform. The Police Department has confirmed this and defended what they did as "intelligence gathering". The use of an undercover officer was bitterly resented by some Silent Sam protestors, and was brought up repeatedly during later protests.

The actions or inaction on August 20, 2018, of the UNC Campus Police and the Chapel Hill Police Department, which differed from their actions at the 2017 protest, have been the subject of many comments. They were to be examined by outside investigators. One Chapel Hill officer was put on administrative leave with pay after his tattoo closely resembling that of a far-right group was seen during the Aug 20 protest. Eight persons, all of whom had been arrested, signed a document alleging police misconduct at the September 8 protest.

A Community Policing Advisory Committee meets monthly to receive feedback concerning the Campus Police. At the August meeting there were 2 attendees, "who wanted to speak about Silent Sam". The September 11 meeting had over 75 participants and was moved to the Chapel Hill Public Library. Campus Police Chief Chris Blue was asked to leave slightly after the meeting began, and he did so. More than 20 people spoke, all of them critical of various police actions: "The people who are there being violent are the police themselves," said an attorney who attended. Several speakers alleged that the police were more lenient with demonstrators from outside the university than they were with student participants.

At an earlier September 5 meeting on the campus, residents asked the town to reconsider its relationship with the Greensboro Police Department, whose Special Operations Division was called in to assist with crowd control during the August 30 protest.

On September 20, 2018, about 75 demonstrators in front of South Building protested "police brutality" and what they called "targeting, harassing, and spying on anti-racist protesters."

=== Reactions ===
==== Critics of the toppling ====
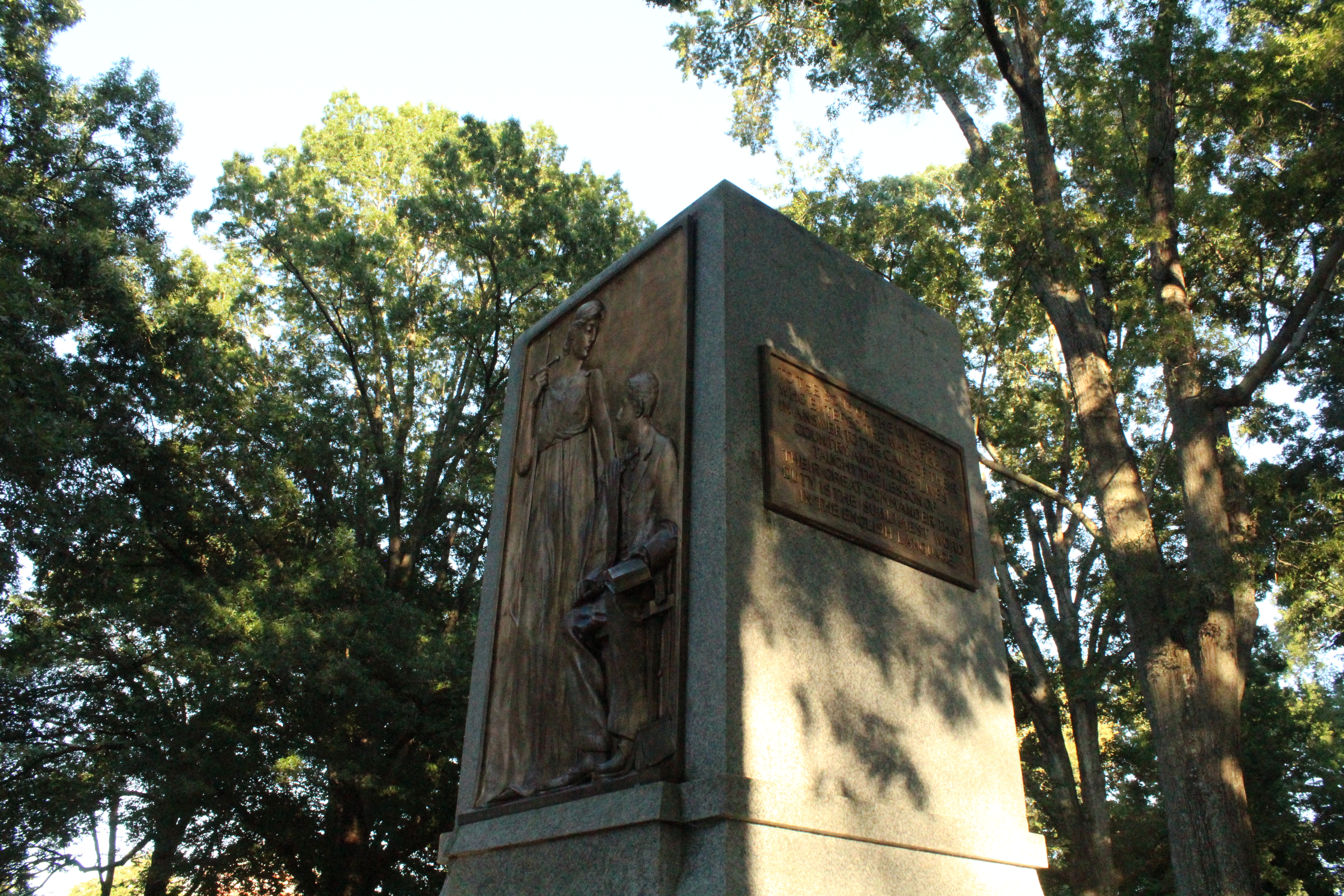
The pedestal remained in McCorkle Place without Silent Sam until January 14, 2019.

- Newspapers
  - Editorial in the Wilson Times: "When demonstrators pulled Silent Sam from his perch Monday night, the University of North Carolina joined an ignoble list of colleges where peaceful protest gives way to lawlessness and mob rule." "North Carolina...has become a focal point in the debate over what should be done with markers honoring the Confederacy."
- Legislators
  - State Representative Bob Steinburg: "It is absolutely inexcusable and those responsible, including security who stood by and let it happen, need to be prosecuted, no excuses!! ... Whoever was on that security detail that allowed this to take place and are seen in this video and can be identified ... need to lose their jobs."
  - State Representative Larry Pittman: "Chaos will be the result if nothing is done.... If we don't stand up and put a stop to this mob rule, it could lead to an actual civil war".
  - Senate leader Phil Berger: "Many of the wounds of racial injustice that still exist in our state and country were created by violent mobs and I can say with certainty that violent mobs won't heal those wounds. Only a civil society that adheres to the rule of law can heal these wounds and politicians – from the Governor down to the local District Attorney – must start that process by ending the deceitful mischaracterization of violent riots as 'rallies' and reestablishing the rule of law in each of our state's cities and counties."
  - House Speaker Tim Moore: "There is no place for the destruction of property on our college campuses or in any North Carolina community; the perpetrators should be arrested and prosecuted by public safety officials to make clear that mob rule and acts of violence will not be tolerated in our state."
- UNC's board of governors and president
  - Former state senator Thom Goolsby, a member of the board of governors: "NC State law is CLEAR. Silent Sam MUST be reinstalled." He was the only member of the board of governors to vote against giving the university until November 15 to develop a plan, "saying the situation should be resolved quickly".
  - Former Assistant U.S. Attorney Joseph Thomas Knott, a member of the board of governors, referred to the protestors as a "mob" and called for the immediate restoration of the monument. He went on to say: "If the leaders of the university heed the threats of violent people, we will be saying that the principles necessary for a civilized society: civility, lawfulness, reasoned debate; those principles we all say are non-negotiable are negotiable after all.”
  - A joint statement from UNC's board of governors chairman Harry Smith and UNC president Margaret Spellings: "The actions last evening were unacceptable, dangerous, and incomprehensible. We are a nation of laws — and mob rule and the intentional destruction of public property will not be tolerated."
- Governor and former governor
  - Governor Roy Cooper: "The actions that toppled Silent Sam bear witness to the strong feelings many North Carolinians have about Confederate monuments. I don't agree with or condone the way that monument came down, but protesters concluded that their leaders would not — could not — act on the frustration and pain it caused." His office issued a similar statement. Cooper has publicly stated his support for removal of Confederate monuments. The announcement that the North Carolina Historical Commission found that the 2015 law prohibited removing three Confederate monuments at the state capitol, which removal Cooper had sought, by coincidence came two days after Silent Sam was toppled. Cooper subsequently called for repeal of the 2015 law.
  - Former governor Pat McCrory, in an August 21 interview, labeled the toppling as mob rule and questioned whether people will begin to call for the destruction of the Washington Monument or Jefferson Memorial, since George Washington and Thomas Jefferson owned slaves. "Do you think these left-wing anarchists are going to end with Silent Sam?" McCrory said. At another stage in the interview, he compared the actions of the protesters to that of the Nazis who tore down statues and burned books.
- Polling: Harper Polling surveyed 500 North Carolina "likely voters" between September 4 and 7, 2018. 70% disapproved of the toppling, 22% approved, and 9% were unsure or declined to answer. 39% said they favor removing Confederate monuments legally, and 50% were opposed. Results broke along age and party lines. In a separate poll of "sixty North Carolina leaders in education, politics, business and advocacy" by The News & Observer, 30 of the 45 respondents said Confederate monuments should be removed. The News & Observer later said that "public opinion on the monument was about as polarized as any political issue these days."
- Alumni and the general public: According to the Chronicle of Higher Education, it and other publications have received "a deluge" of emails "demand[ing] that the statue be re-erected".
- On November 11, 2018, Veterans Day, a plane towing a Confederate flag and the banner "Restore Silent Sam Now" flew over Chapel Hill. "Kevin Stone, North Carolina Division Commander of the Sons of Confederate Veterans, took credit on Facebook for the flight."

==== Supporters of the toppling ====
- Newspapers
  - The editorial board of The Charlotte Observer, North Carolina's largest newspaper, saw the toppling of the statue as an act of civil disobedience, "a tradition that goes back at least to Henry David Thoreau, who famously argued that it is the citizen's duty not to acquiesce and allow the government to perpetrate injustice." The toppling of the statue is compared to Rosa Parks, who broke the law by refusing to give up her bus seat, the Greensboro four, and the Boston Tea Party. The Observer said the action was not "mob rule": "Mob rule was what happened at Little Rock Central High School in 1957 when nine black students, even armed with a U.S. Supreme Court ruling, were turned back by an angry and violent white mob."
  - Editorial board of the Winston-Salem Journal: "Silent Sam had to go.... Their cause was just, if not their methods. And it is easy to understand their mounting frustration and anger.... Blame 'mob rule' if you will. But it was poor leadership in Chapel Hill and Raleigh that ultimately led to Monday night."
  - Editorial board of The Fayetteville Observer: "The most surprising thing about the toppling of "Silent Sam" on the UNC-Chapel Hill campus Tuesday night was that it took so long to happen. ... And as cities and states across the South have seen frequent protests and have wrestled with decisions about the nature, meaning and location of their many monuments to the Civil War and the soldiers who fought in it, North Carolina's official position has been to do nothing. ... It's clear that Silent Sam was meant to be a reminder to blacks of the doctrine of white supremacy that was prevalent then and is still too much with us today." Myron Pitts, staff writer at The Fayetteville Observer, said in the newspaper "It was past time to remove UNC's Silent Sam. State and university officials' lack of leadership led to last week's events."
  - Editorial in The Daily Tar Heel, UNC-CH's student newspaper: "[I]t's heartening to hear that leaders in UNC and Orange County do not want Silent Sam replaced or reinstated, but at the end of the day, their lack of action in the moments that matter make them complicit in white supremacy. Finding [Maya] Little guilty and spending $400,000 (Note: equivalent to $512,854 in 2025) a year to keep a Confederate statue up relay the same message: The leaders in our community refuse to completely denounce white supremacy and its symbols.... When leaders refuse to completely denounce obvious symbols of white supremacy, no progress will be made toward systematic injustices that are woven into the culture of this University. The Editorial Board hopes community leaders will take substantive action in the future regarding Silent Sam and other Confederate symbols."
  - Editorial in Technician, NC State student newspaper, reprinted in The Daily Tar Heel : "[W]e fully support the actions of the protesters. The practice of vandalism is something that in normal circumstances, Technician does not condone. However, as all legal recourse had been pursued, and UNC students' authority to shape their own campus environment had been undermined by the state and the university, we support the risk taken by these individuals, in full knowledge of the legal repercussions they may face."
  - Editorial board of The Daily Reflector (Greenville, N.C.): "Frustrated at being given no alternatives, protesters took matters into their own hands.... Those responsible have to be charged and prosecuted.... But our history demonstrates the inevitability of the public's embrace of freedom and individual rights — and the progressive disappearance of institutions and symbols that stand in the way."
  - Editorial board of The Washington Post: "It's not a surprise that citizens would take matters into their own hands when arbitrary curbs had been placed on local democracy."
- UNC students
  - The UNC undergraduate student government executive branch posted a letter to all students, saying "the African-American activists had 'courage and resilience' and had 'corrected a moral and historical wrong that needed to be righted if we were ever to move forward as a university.'"
- UNC faculty
  - Groups
    - 42 UNC faculty members signed a letter published in The News & Observer on August 23 claiming UNC administration "dodged" the Silent Sam issue, leading to "not the most desirable" situation but one that had to come nonetheless. "The time is now for the university administration to show leadership, not bureaucratic obfuscation," the letter reads. "Show us that you and the university do indeed stand for Lux et Libertas, not sustaining and enforcing the symbols of human cruelty." The letter quoted John F. Kennedy: "Those who make peaceful revolution impossible make violent revolution inevitable."
    - 29 faculty members in the Department of History (August 23): "Civil disobedience, particularly among students, has a long and storied history in the United States, especially in the American South. The hyperbolic characterization of Silent Sam's toppling as 'lawlessness' and 'mob action' by Chancellor Folt and UNC System leaders demonstrates a purposeful, obdurate disregard for historical and social context."
    - The University of North Carolina's Center for the Study of the American South (August 23): "UNC's leadership refuses to recognize that their own inaction put our community in danger. We acknowledge the constraints they face but we urge them to stand on the right side of history and join us in rejecting simplistic interpretations of last night's actions as vandalism. Silent Sam was violence. Protestors who removed it sought to reorient our future toward non-violence."
    - The University of North Carolina's Center for Civil Rights (September 7): "Martin Luther King, Jr. and the civil rights demonstrators of the 1950s and 1960s knew that there were just laws and unjust laws, and they were prepared to pay the price of violating unjust laws. As those who train new generations of students in law, we at the UNC Center for Civil Rights cannot advocate lawlessness, but we can teach about the traditions of resistance to unjust laws. We did not urge protesters to take the actions that brought down Silent Sam, but we do believe that the University of North Carolina at Chapel Hill and the State of North Carolina will be better for having Silent Sam removed from its place of honor on the campus. Silent Sam was never silent."
  - Individuals
    - Joseph T. Glatthaar, Stephenson Distinguished Professor of American Civil War Studies, University of North Carolina: "I understand that many people want to honor the sacrifices and efforts of their ancestors, but Silent Sam represented the worst aspects and deeds of those ancestors.... The University and the state should offer magnanimous terms to those students and allow them to return to school unpunished."
    - Barbara Rimer, Dean of the Gillings School of Global Public Health at the University of North Carolina at Chapel Hill, in a public letter, "suggested a monument to a person who promoted peace, equity or prevention, instead of a return to Silent Sam." "An ever-potent symbol of a past we said we aimed to transcend, the statue sent a powerful, contradictory message. In its silence, it spoke loudly. It's no wonder that, as other states sought to move beyond the past by removing statues, our inability to do so caused wounds to fester until the pain became unbearable. It is not surprising that it happened Monday night. It is only surprising that it did not happen sooner."
    - Former UNC-CH Chancellor James Moeser: "I will confess to you that one of my failings as chancellor was not removing that monument when I had had a chance to do it. [When activists toppled the statue] I gave a private cheer when our students had the courage to do what I didn't have the courage to do."
- Scholars (see also Glatthaar, above)
  - In an op-ed in The New York Times, scholars of slavery Ethan J. Kytle and Blain Roberts, authors of Denmark Vesey's Garden. Slavery and Memory in the Cradle of the Confederacy (2018), professors of history at California State University, Fresno, with Ph.D.s in history from the University of North Carolina at Chapel Hill: "We once believed that Confederate statues should be left up but also placed in historical context.... Over time, however, we lost our enthusiasm for this approach.... The white supremacist intent of these monuments, in other words, is not a relic of the past.... The prominence of the memorials shows how white Southerners etched racism into the earth with impunity." Their recommendation: leaving the "empty pedestal — shorn all original images and inscriptions — eliminates the offending tribute while still preserving a record of what these communities did and where they did it.... The most effective way to commemorate the rise and fall of white supremacist monument-building is to preserve unoccupied pedestals as the ruins that they are — broken tributes to a morally bankrupt cause."
  - Karen Cox, professor of history at the University of North Carolina at Charlotte and the author of Dixie's Daughters: The United Daughters of the Confederacy and the Preservation of Confederate Culture (2003): "People seem to be at their wit's end. When people feel they're not being heard, when people don't have a place at the table, then this is the result."
  - Adam Domby, historian of the Civil War, Reconstruction, and the American South, with a Ph.D. in history from UNC at Chapel Hill: "I think ultimately what really did this (toppling) is the Heritage laws were really undemocratic.... They're taking away any recourse for communities who want to remove a monument." It was Domby who unearthed the Carr speech (see above).
- Legislators
  - In a joint statement, State Senator Valerie Foushee, Representative Verla Insko, and Representative Graig R. Meyer said the removal of UNC's Confederate statue was long overdue. "It was past time for Silent Sam to be moved from a place of honor on the campus of the University of the People. It is unfortunate that state legislators chose not to hear and pass the bill we filed earlier this year to move the monument to an indoor site where it would stand as a reminder of the bitter racial struggle that continues to burden our country.
  - U.S. Representative David Price: "It should not have taken an act of civil disobedience to remove this monument to hate. We should not condone actions that threaten public health or safety but neither should politicians in Raleigh prevent local communities from taking action through peaceful means."
- Religious leaders
  - Olin T. Binkley Memorial Baptist Church: "Racism is still not eradicated in this day. We, members of a Chapel Hill faith community, seek to follow a man named Jesus who, at every turn, identified with the outcasts and spoke truth to power. He did not wait until a convenient time to speak or act. We believe it was time to act in ridding the UNC campus of a very public Silent Sam.... We support placing a placard in place of the statue, reminding us of what once stood there and what it stood for."
- Museum director
  - Former Orange County Historical Museum director Candace Midgett: "James Grossman, the executive director of the American Historical Association, has said that these statues were meant to create 'legitimate garb for white supremacy,' and queries why we would put up a statue of Robert E. Lee or Stonewall Jackson—or, I would add, Silent Sam—in times of real suppression of civil rights of people of color in places like Raleigh, in places like Chapel Hill. There's only one meaning to be extracted from that, and that is that these monuments are about touting white supremacy and intimidating people of color. That is why they were made, and that's what they continue to reflect where they stand. I believe the board of the university and the administration have this one chance to be on the right side of history, and I'm hoping they find a way to take it."

=== Anniversary ===
- On August 20, 2019, the anniversary of the toppling, a "Silent Sam is Down: Anniversary Party!" was held at the new Peace and Justice Plaza on Franklin Street.

=== Documentary ===
A student documentary about the statue, "Silence Sam", was shown on November 30, 2018, at Duke University, under the sponsorship of Duke's Center for Documentary Studies.

=== Political repercussions ===
According to the Carolina Journal in September 2018, the controversy surrounding Silent Sam was becoming a political issue that could affect the 2018 elections in the state, "a development that, in most cases, would hurt Democrats". In a September poll, 76% of swing voters and 93% of Republicans disapproved of the toppling; as did 44% of Democrats, versus 41% who approved.

Also according to the Carolina Journal, the Silent Sam affair has national implications: "As public universities bend under the force of rampant—sometimes violent—political unrest, all eyes turn to UNC-Chapel Hill, where the toppling of a Confederate statue recharges a national conversation about public safety and the future of free speech... The University of North Carolina at Chapel Hill is poised to set a national example of allowing lawful protest while protecting free speech. But campus administrators and law enforcers so far have come up short, some experts say."

=== Archival material ===
In response to an August 21 request from WRAL-TV, on September 12 the UNC-CH administration released 800 pages of emails and texts relevant to the toppling.

== Disposition debate ==
From August 2018, Silent Sam was being kept in an undisclosed location because of safety concerns. In September 2019, a student reporter found what appeared to be the statue and pedestal under tarpaulins in a storage yard on the UNC campus. The university declined to confirm or deny the report.

The University of North Carolina system president, Margaret Spellings, summarised the situation: "The people who are paying the bills in the state of North Carolina, who underwrite in very significant ways the cost of operating that and every other institution in this system, by all polling and all accounts seem to support the restoration of the statue. Conversely, the community of Chapel Hill seems to feel very strongly that it should not be restored to its original place."

=== Reinstallation ===
Thom Goolsby, board of governors member and former state senator, has said that the law is "perfectly clear": "Silent Sam needs to go back up on that same spot. Anything short of that is giving into mob rule and anarchy, and I won't agree with it."

The administrative board of the library stated publicly that it did not want the statue in any university library, and recommended that it go to a location such as Raleigh's North Carolina Museum of History. On August 28, 41 department chairs in the College of Arts and Sciences sent a letter to Chancellor Folt opposing the return of Silent Sam to its pedestal or any prominent location on campus. At the end of August, 37 Chapel Hill faith leaders wrote an open letter saying that "returning Silent Sam to its previous location furthers the goal of those who originally put it there: venerating white supremacy, and denigrating people of color."

Mayor of Chapel Hill Pam Hemminger had written the university on August 17, 2017, requesting that Silent Sam be moved (see above). On September 21, 2018, Mayor Hemminger and the entire town council wrote Folt and other UNC leaders:

Prominent placement of the Silent Sam monument at McCorkle Place in downtown Chapel Hill is an offense to the entire Chapel Hill community, including African-American students, faculty members, university employees, local residents, and business persons who call Chapel Hill home, as well as to returning alumni and the countless fans and tourists who visit our Town every year. To them and to us, Silent Sam and its roots in pro-slavery, pro-segregation ideology represent the antithesis of the high value that UNC and the Town of Chapel Hill place on being a welcoming and inclusive place for all.

The Mayor also mentioned the threat to public safety, the negative impact on downtown Chapel Hill, and the "unsustainable strain" on finances and other resources that the statue represented. The North Carolina Attorney General, Josh Stein, also made a statement supporting the removal or relocation of "statues that...promote white supremacy".

=== Relocation on campus ===
Former Chancellor James Moeser said it was "inconceivable" that the statue go back on the pedestal, and proposed the creation of a civil rights museum on campus, perhaps in the Playmakers Theatre building, wherein the statue could be displayed.

On August 31, Chancellor Folt issued a statement saying that Silent Sam's original location was "a cause for division and a threat to public safety," and that, with the approval of the university system's board of governors, she was seeking input on a "safe, legal and alternative" location for the statue elsewhere on campus. On November 9, a further statement from Chancellor Folt said that a decision had not yet been made, and the board of governors had granted a "short extension" to this deadline.

On September 4, 2018, a letter from 450 UNC faculty members, supporting Folt's preference for relocating the statue, was sent to the board of governors, board of trustees, and key administrators. "The civic, economic, emotional, and cultural well-being of our community, as well as the university's educational mission, will suffer continued damage by the presence of the monument on McCorkle Place." On the same day, 8 alumni co-chairs of a fundraising committee, most former members of the trustees or the board of visitors, sent a letter to the board of trustees: This is an "increasingly dangerous situation impacting our students and faculty and threatening to tarnish the reputation of our nation's first public university, as well as the State of North Carolina.... Now that Silent Sam is down, we are united in agreeing that it should not return to its former location." The Chapel Hill-Carrboro Chamber of Commerce and the Chapel Hill Downtown Partnership also called for the permanent relocation of Silent Sam, saying the continued protests around the monument are hurting business and threatening the safety of the town.

=== Removal from campus ===
A September 7, 2018, statement in The Washington Post from 59 black UNC-CH faculty members asked that the university "permanently remove the Confederate statue and its pedestal from the University of North Carolina at Chapel Hill.... A symbol of racism, violence, and white supremacy has no place on our 21st century campus often called the 'University of the People'." 417 other UNC-CH faculty signed a letter of support.

On October 12, the Faculty Council, UNC's main faculty body, passed a resolution requesting the permanent removal of the statue and its base. "Returning the statue to the UNC-Chapel Hill campus would reaffirm the values of white supremacy that motivated its original installation," the resolution said. "Moreover, to do so would undermine the physical security of all members of our community."

== Overturned transfer to Sons of Confederate Veterans ==
In November 2019, the University of North Carolina's board of governors announced that ownership of the statue was being transferred to the North Carolina Division of the Sons of Confederate Veterans (SCV), on the condition that it not be displayed in any county in which the university has a campus. The university also agreed to fund an independent charitable trust—with $2.5 million in money not from the state—to be used for care and preservation of the statue. The announcement was part of a settlement of a lawsuit brought by the SCV.

The agreement was criticised by university staff, alumni and students, who accused the university of a back-room deal with white supremacists. There had been no public discussion on the disposition of the statue prior to the board of governors's announcement.

On February 12, 2020, after the statue and money had been handed over to the SCV, Orange County Superior Court Judge Allen Baddour, who had originally approved the settlement, overturned it, ruling that the Sons of Confederate Veterans lacked standing for the suit. The statue and money—minus legal expenses—were returned to the UNC system, and Baddour dismissed the lawsuit on April 28.

The Daily Tar Heel sued the UNC System alleging that the UNC had violated open meeting laws when making the decision. The suit was settled in 2021 and the UNC System stated that staff members, not the Board of Governors, negotiated the settlement with the SCV.

== See also ==
- List of Confederate monuments and memorials
- Monument and memorial controversies in the United States
- Removal of Confederate monuments and memorials
- Rhodes Must Fall
- Speaker Ban Memorial
- Unsung Founders Memorial
