= Cultural History Artifact Management and Patriotism Act of 2015 =

The Cultural History Artifact Management and Patriotism Act of 2015 is a law, SL 2015–170, passed by the General Assembly of North Carolina in 2015. The law's self-description is:

An act to ensure respectful treatment of the American flag and the North Carolina flag by state agencies and other political subdivisions of the state; to establish the Division of Veterans Affairs as the clearinghouse for the disposal of worn, tattered, and damaged flags; to provide for the protection of monuments and memorials commemorating events, persons, and military service in North Carolina history; and to transfer custody of certain historic documents in the possession of the Office of the Secretary of State to the Department of Cultural Resources and to facilitate public opportunity to view these documents.

"Many observers have inferred that the purpose of this legislation is the protection of these [Confederate] monuments, an inference that has had significant implications for the heated public debate surrounding the statute." "The North Carolina HPA is functionally a complete prohibition of monument removal."

The law was in the news in 2018 because Governor Roy Cooper called for the removal of three Confederate monuments on the grounds of the state capitol (see List of Confederate monuments and memorials#North Carolina). Since the law says that "a monument, memorial, or work of art owned by the State may not be removed, relocated, or altered in any way without the approval of the North Carolina Historical Commission", he, through the North Carolina Department of Administration, sent to the Commission in September 2017 a request that they approve the removal. In a statement issued on August 22, 2018, the Commission found that another part of the act ("an object of remembrance located on public property may not be permanently removed") prevented them from approving the Governor's request. Cooper subsequently called for the law's repeal.

Officials of the University of North Carolina at Chapel Hill have said many times that they wanted to remove Silent Sam, a Confederate monument located prominently at the original entrance to the campus, but were prohibited from doing so by this law. The monument was toppled by protestors on August 20, 2018.

== See also ==
- Silent Sam
- Confederate Soldiers Monument (Durham, North Carolina)
