= Sonja Haynes Stone Center for Black Culture and History =

Coordinates: 35.9079°N 79.0501°W

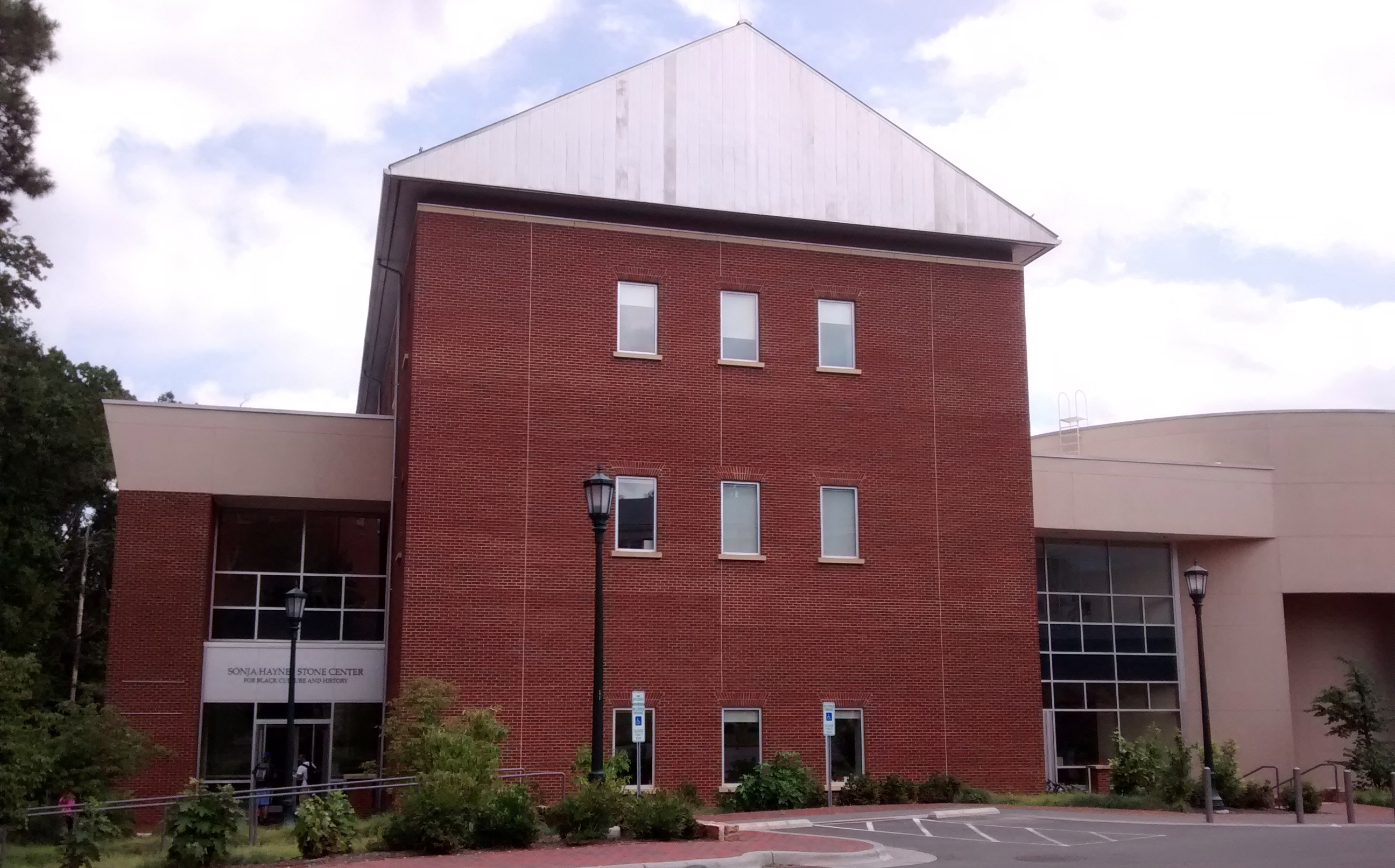

The Sonja Haynes Stone Center for Black Culture and History (originally the Black Cultural Center) was founded on July 1, 1988, at the University of North Carolina at Chapel Hill.

== Directors of the Stone Center ==
- Margo Crawford (1988 - 1994)
- Dr. Gerald Horne (1996 - 1999)
- Mr. Harry Amana (1999 - 2001, Interim)
- Dr. Joseph F. Jordan (2001 - 2022)
- Dr. LeRhonda S. Manigault-Bryant (2023–Present)

== Foundation and renaming ==
The center's goal, according to its first director, Margo Crawford, was to advance black literary and artistic endeavors while trying to understand the cultural diversity on campus. In the fall of 1991, after the successful lobbying of the UNC board of trustees by a group of students, the center was renamed for Dr. Sonja Haynes Stone, an associate professor of Afro-American studies who had died on August 10, 1991, at the age of 51, after suffering a stroke. Dr. Stone was director of the Afro-American Studies curriculum from 1974 to 1979, and from 1974 to 1980 she was adviser to the Black Student Movement, an organization that would later press for renaming the Black Cultural Center in her honor.

== Controversy and student movement: 1991–1992 ==
From its inception, the Black Cultural Center was in the midst of controversy. Soon after the Black Cultural Center's creation, university trustee John Pope was quoted as saying, "it seems to me if (black students) are interested in a Black Cultural Center, maybe those students should attend a black university." An editorial in UNC's student newspaper, The Daily Tar Heel, called Pope's comment "appalling." Students turned out to be very interested in a Black Cultural Center: the movement for a free-standing center was the largest student protest movement UNC had seen since the Vietnam War.

=== Students state their demands ===
On Tuesday, March 17, 1992, a hundred students assembled at South Building, the center of UNC's administration, to demand an answer from Chancellor Paul Hardin III about three demands: higher-wages for UNC's housekeepers, a free-standing Black Cultural Center, and an endowed professorship in Dr. Sonja Haynes Stone's name. Since its foundation nearly four years prior, the BCC had been located in a 900 square-foot renovated snack bar inside the Student Union, and both students and administrators alike agreed that it needed more space. But Hardin's answer was negative on all counts. He, like many other administrators, was concerned that a free-standing Black Cultural Center would lead to segregation and separatism, and he suggested an addition to the union as an alternative.

=== Students demonstrate ===
On Saturday, September 3, 300 demonstrators gathered outside Paul Hardin's house to shout their demands for a free-standing center. The students were broken up by the police around midnight. Student involvement continued to grow, and on Thursday, September 10, somewhere in the range of 600 to 1500 students peacefully marched into South Building and presented Chancellor Hardin with a letter demanding that he support a free-standing center and choose a site by November 13. Students reportedly waved from the windows chanting "black power," and disrupted work for 15 minutes. Their letter came with an ultimatum: "Failure to respond to this deadline will leave the people no other choice but to organize toward direct action." The event, which ended with a rally in the pit, UNC's social center, was organized by a coalition of black athletes, the Black Awareness Council. Margo Crawford, the Black Cultural Center's director at the time, attributed much of the movement's progress to the four football players - John Bradley, Jimmy Hitchcock, Malcolm Marshall, and Tim Smith - who founded the Black Awareness Council.

=== Chancellor Hardin asks for negotiations ===
On the Tuesday following the march on South Building, Chancellor Hardin called for student activists to sit with administrators and craft a proposal, which could be for a free-standing structure, to send to the board of trustees. Chuck Stone, syndicated columnist and journalism professor at UNC, noted that ""Hardin has changed his stance significantly," but student groups were still annoyed that Hardin had not spoken to them directly. In response to these complaints Hardin agreed on Wednesday to be present for negotiations.

=== Intervention of Spike Lee ===
On Friday, September 18, Spike Lee, filmmaker and spokesperson for black causes, spoke in support of the movement to an audience of 7000 students, about three fourths of whom were black, at UNC's Dean Smith Center. The rally began with chants of "What do you want? BCC! When do you want it? Now!" Lee, who is a cousin-by-marriage of the late Sonja Haynes Stone, for whom the center would be named, said that what most impressed him was "the fact that this movement is led by athletes", and most of his 10-minute speech discussed the power that black athletes have. Khalid Abdul Muhammad of the Nation of Islam was also present at the rally. Feeling alienated by the fierce rhetoric of "black power," many white students set out to collect petitions in favor of a multicultural center, which would better represent all minorities on campus.

=== Formation of a panel ===
On Wednesday, September 23, a thirteen-person panel was named "to find a home for UNC-CH's new Black Cultural Center." The panel included, among others, Doloris Jordan, mother of former UNC basketball player Michael Jordan, and Harvey Gantt, the first black mayor of Charlotte. Despite the efforts of Provost Richard McCormick and Chancellor Paul Hardin, the panel did not include any members from the student coalition that pressed for a freestanding center or members of the cultural center's advisory board, mostly students. According to McCormick, "any appropriate architectural forms and land sites will be considered in light of the programmatic plan that the working group develops." Students who supported the new center remained skeptical: Black Student Movement president, Michelle Thomas, asked "why start all over again? It's just another stall tactic."

=== Panel supports a free-standing black cultural center ===
On Monday, October 5, the panel formally supported a free-standing black cultural center with a 10-2 vote. After the decision, Richard "Stick" Williams resigned from the panel. Worried that the panel had too quickly made the difficult decision of whether to make the center free-standing, Williams said "We've made that decision quickly just so we could get the students to the table." The students, for their part, were waiting for a declaration of support from Chancellor Hardin. On Monday, October 12, more than 150 students marched to Memorial Hall to disrupt University Day, the day on which administrators and faculty in academic regalia celebrate the university's foundation. As the administrators and faculty filed in the students stood in silence holding signs that read "no more waiting," "no justice, no peace" and "Hardin's Plantation". As the ceremony was about to begin the students marched into the hall, singing "If you won't let us build a building, then put on your hoods and roll," to the applause of some in attendance.

=== Hardin's support for a free-standing black cultural center ===
Hardin issued a statement offering his support for a free-standing black cultural center on Thursday, October 15. Initially the students were suspicious of the Chancellor's language, which stated that he supported a "... free-standing facility to house the center ..." The activists thought that this might mean that the center would share a building with other programs, but a day later, after Provost McCormick personally clarified the ambiguity, the student activist leaders at last agreed to come to the table to help in the planning of the new facility. The students placed two stipulations on their participation: they wanted the planning to be done largely by the center's existing advisory committee; they wanted the center to remain student run for the most part. In an October 19 meeting of the panel, the students agreed to suspend their threat of "direct action" if Hardin did not support a free-standing center by November 13. The activist students had achieved a victory, but Black Student Movement President Michelle Thomas showed an awareness of the different challenges that lay ahead: "First we were concerned with step one, and that was the chancellor. Now, we're doing step two, which is the proposal. Once we get to step three—the trustees—we do what we have to do."
