= Confederate Soldiers Monument (Durham, North Carolina) =

- “The Boys Who Wore Gray”
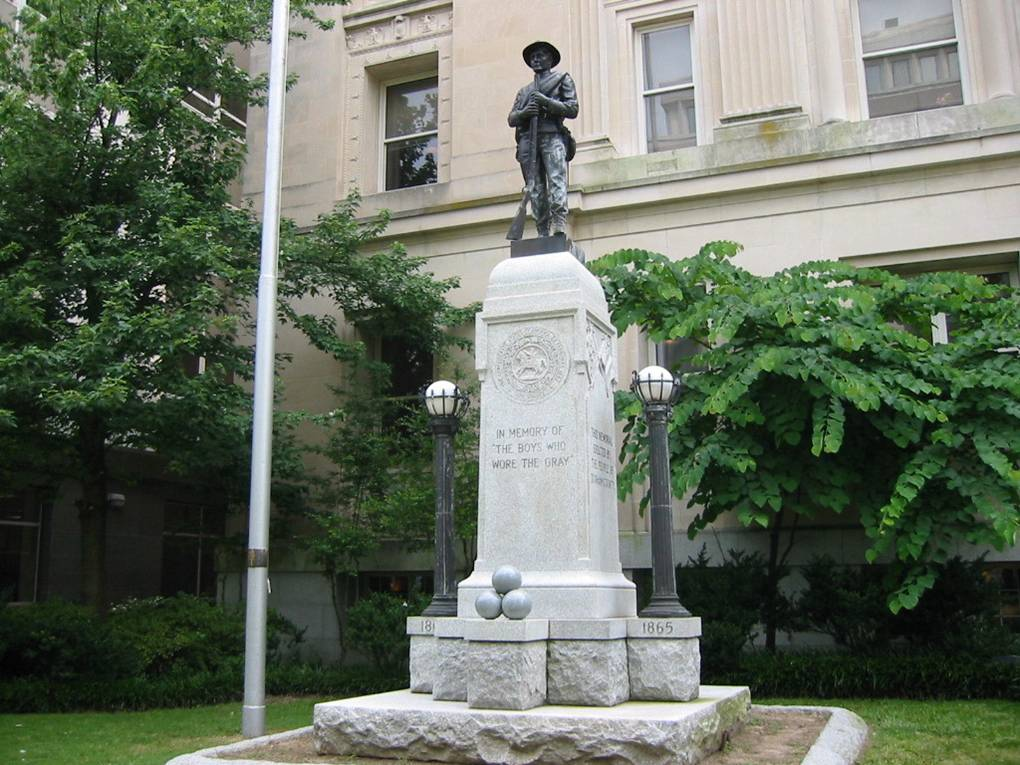
- The monument prior to its removal
- Year: 1924
- Medium: Bronze sculpture; granite (plinth)
- Dimensions: 4.6 m (15 ft)
- Condition: Partially removed
- Location: Durham, North Carolina, United States
- 35.993953°N 78.899012°W

The Confederate Soldiers Monument (popularly known as The Boys Who Wore Gray) was a memorial to the soldiers from Durham County who fought for the Confederate States of America in the American Civil War. The statue was seriously damaged by protestors and removed from public view on August 14, 2017.

== Description ==
The monument was a bronze sculpture (not solid) of a male armed and uniformed Confederate soldier atop a granite base. The plinth also held two lampposts and a pyramid of four cannonballs. The inscriptions on the base read (Note: The inscriptions are in all capital letters, but are rendered here in sentence case for ease of reading.) In memory of "The boys who wore the gray" on the front, This memorial erected by the people of Durham County on the right, and Dedicated May 10th, 1924 on the left.

== History ==
The monument was erected in 1924 in front of the Old Durham County Courthouse in Durham, North Carolina and dedicated on May 10, 1924. The United Daughters of the Confederacy advocated for the statue, but were unable to pay for it. It was paid for with public money—specifically one-half of one percent of local county taxes—through a provision that had to go through the state legislature.

The statue was pulled down and severely damaged by protestors on August 14, 2017, as part of nationwide demonstrations that followed the fatal attack on counterprotestors at Unite the Right rally in Charlottesville, Virginia. For the illegal removal of the statue, the Durham County sheriff's office arrested and charged 7 protestors with multiple felonies and misdemeanors, including felony inciting a riot and misdemeanor disorderly conduct by injury to a statue. (All charges against the protestors were dropped on February 20, 2018.)

Additional protests were held on August 18, 2017, among rumors of a possible KKK rally in opposition to the statue's removal. As part of the August 18 protests, a piece of paper reading "shame" was taped onto the inscription, causing it to read In shame of "The boys who wore the gray". "Death to the Klan" was written below this altered inscription in marker.

The damaged statue was placed into storage by the Durham police. Due to the state's Cultural History Artifact Management and Patriotism Act of 2015, changes to the statue or its base cannot occur without the permission of the North Carolina Historical Commission, and by the same law, the commission can only approve moves to a location equally prominent on the same site.

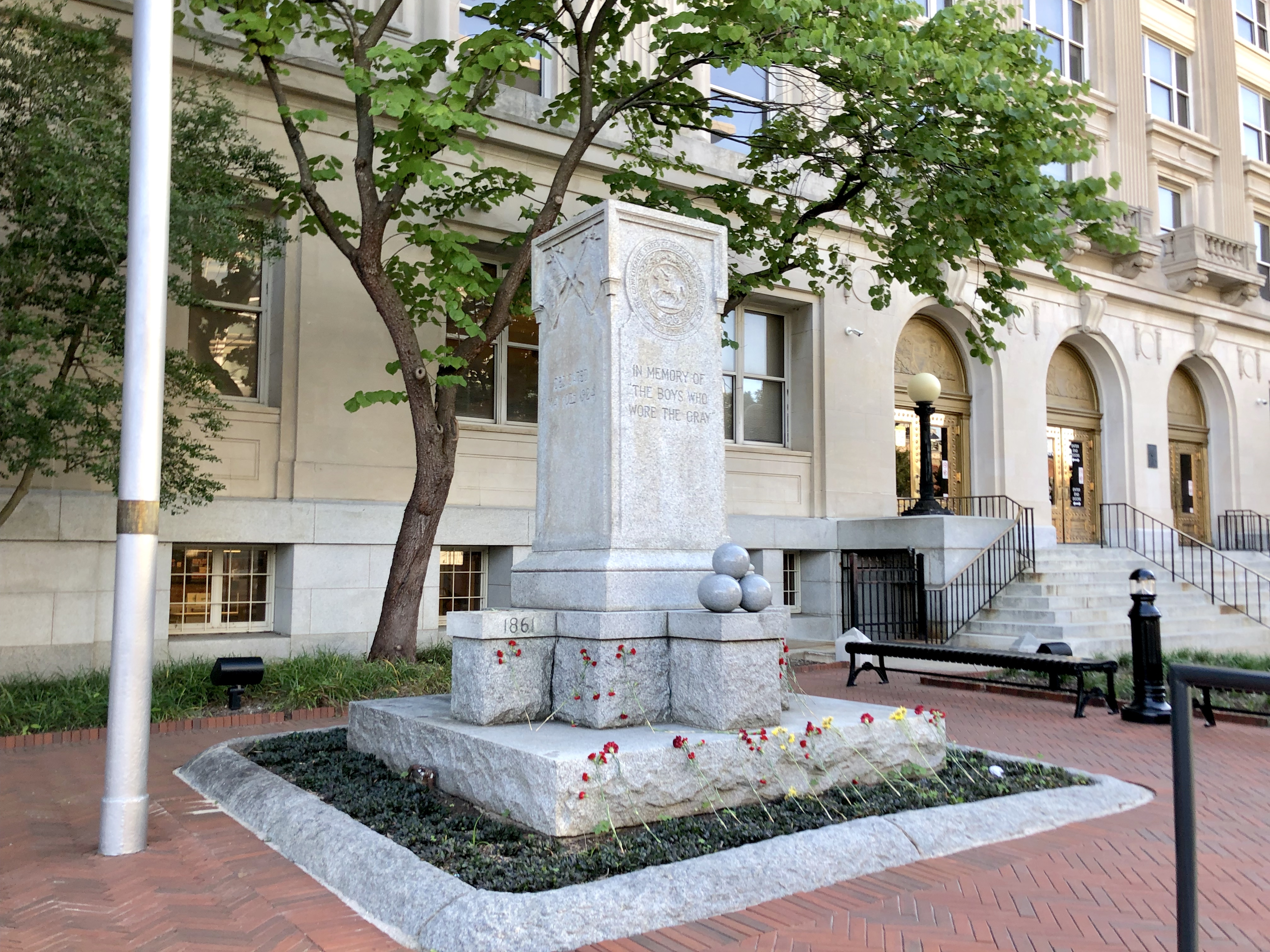
The monument after the statue was torn down

The Durham City-County Committee on Confederate Monuments and Memorials was created in response to the statue's removal and first convened in April 2018 to issue recommendations on what to do with the remaining base within the confines of this law, as well to catalog and issue recommendations on other Confederate memorials in the area. In early 2019, the Committee recommended that it be displayed inside the county administrative building in its crumpled state. "The committee said displaying the statue in its current damaged form would add important context. The proposal would leave the statue's pedestal in place and add outdoor markers honoring Union soldiers and enslaved people." The proposal needs approval from the Durham County Commission. Durham County maintains that the Cultural History Artifact Management and Patriotism Act of 2015 does not apply, since the law does not address damaged monuments.

Between midnight and 3:00am on Tuesday, August 11, 2020, the base of the monument was removed by officials and transported to an undisclosed location.

== See also ==
- 1924 in art
- List of Confederate monuments and memorials
- Removal of Confederate monuments and memorials
- Silent Sam, University of North Carolina at Chapel Hill—a Confederate statue which in August 2018 was similarly pulled down by protestors
