= Unsung Founders Memorial =

Coordinates: 35°54′49.1″N 79°3′6.2″W

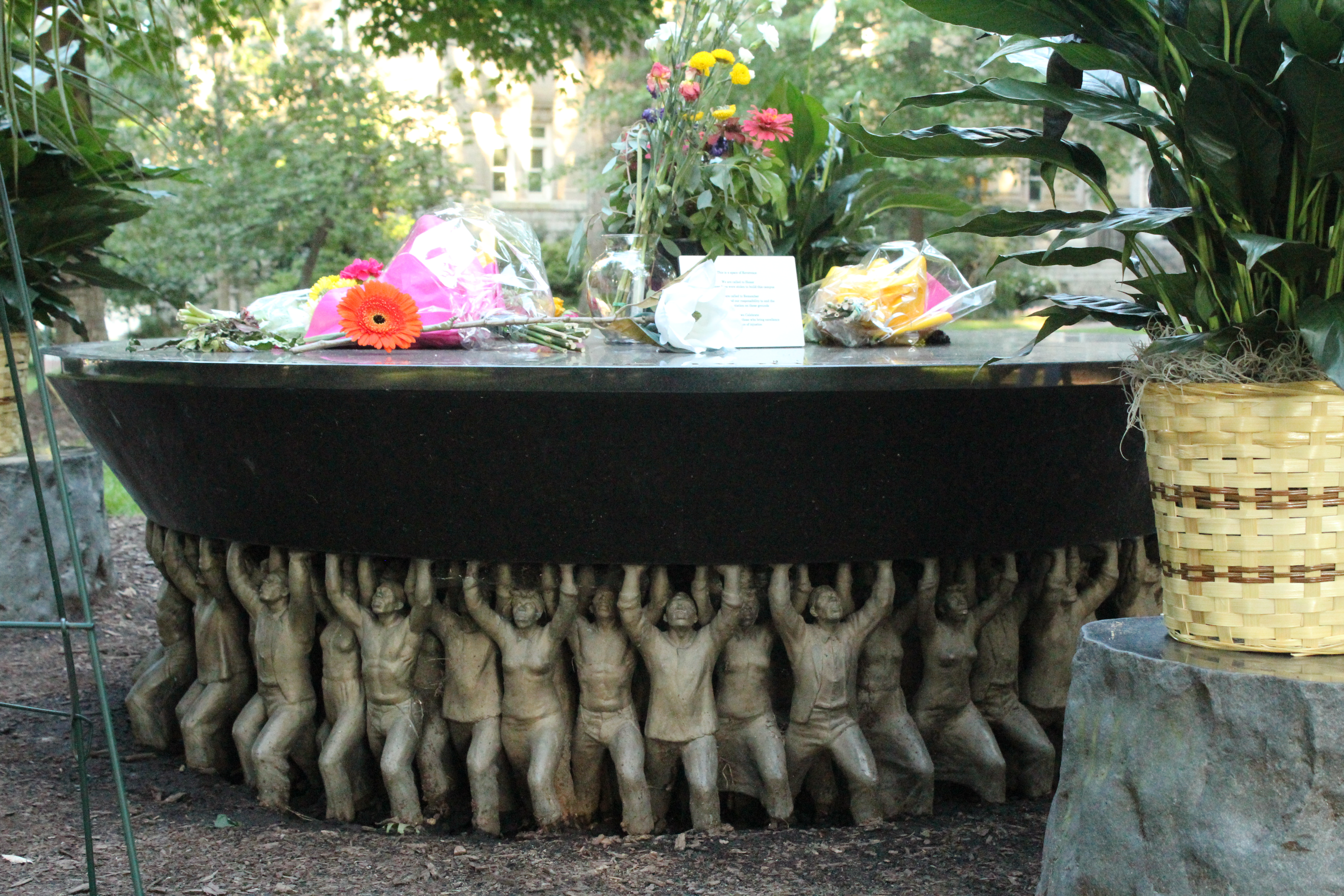
- The memorial with flowers in 2018
- Interactive map of Unsung Founders Memorial
- Location: University of North Carolina, Chapel Hill, North Carolina
- Dedicated: November 5, 2005

The Unsung Founders Memorial at the University of North Carolina at Chapel Hill is a memorial located in McCorkle Place, one of the University's quads. It consists of a black granite tabletop supported by 300 bronze figurines and surrounded by 5 black stone seats. The inscription around the edge of the table reads:

The Class Of 2002 Honors The University's Unsung Founders – The People Of Color, Bond And Free – Who Helped Build The Carolina That We Cherish Today.

The memorial was a class gift by the Class of 2002, described at the time of its construction as "the most successful senior class gift campaign".

== History and funding ==
The senior class of 2002 exceeded their goal of $40,000 by raising approximately $54,000 towards the construction of the memorial. The students themselves contributed $20,000 of this, with the rest donated by parents, friends, faculty and friends of the University. An additional $40,000 was secured from the university provost's office. The final cost of the memorial itself was around $80,000, and the remaining funds were used for preparation of the site and the installation ceremony.

Emily Stevens, director of the young alumni program for the Office of Development, said "The effort the class put forth to get the word out was a major factor".

Students sent requests to around seventy artists, receiving responses from eleven. They then narrowed the choice down to four artists, three of whom came to Chapel Hill for interviews. Korean artist Do-Ho Suh, who has a background in work exemplifying the concepts of collective versus individual and identity versus anonymity, was eventually selected to create the memorial.

The location for the memorial was selected by agreement between Suh and the 2002 senior class officers, with final approval by the UNC Building Grounds Committee. Suh identified three possible locations, which were reviewed by the committee to identify a prominent location which was sensitive to the existing tree planting on the campus.

== Dedication ==
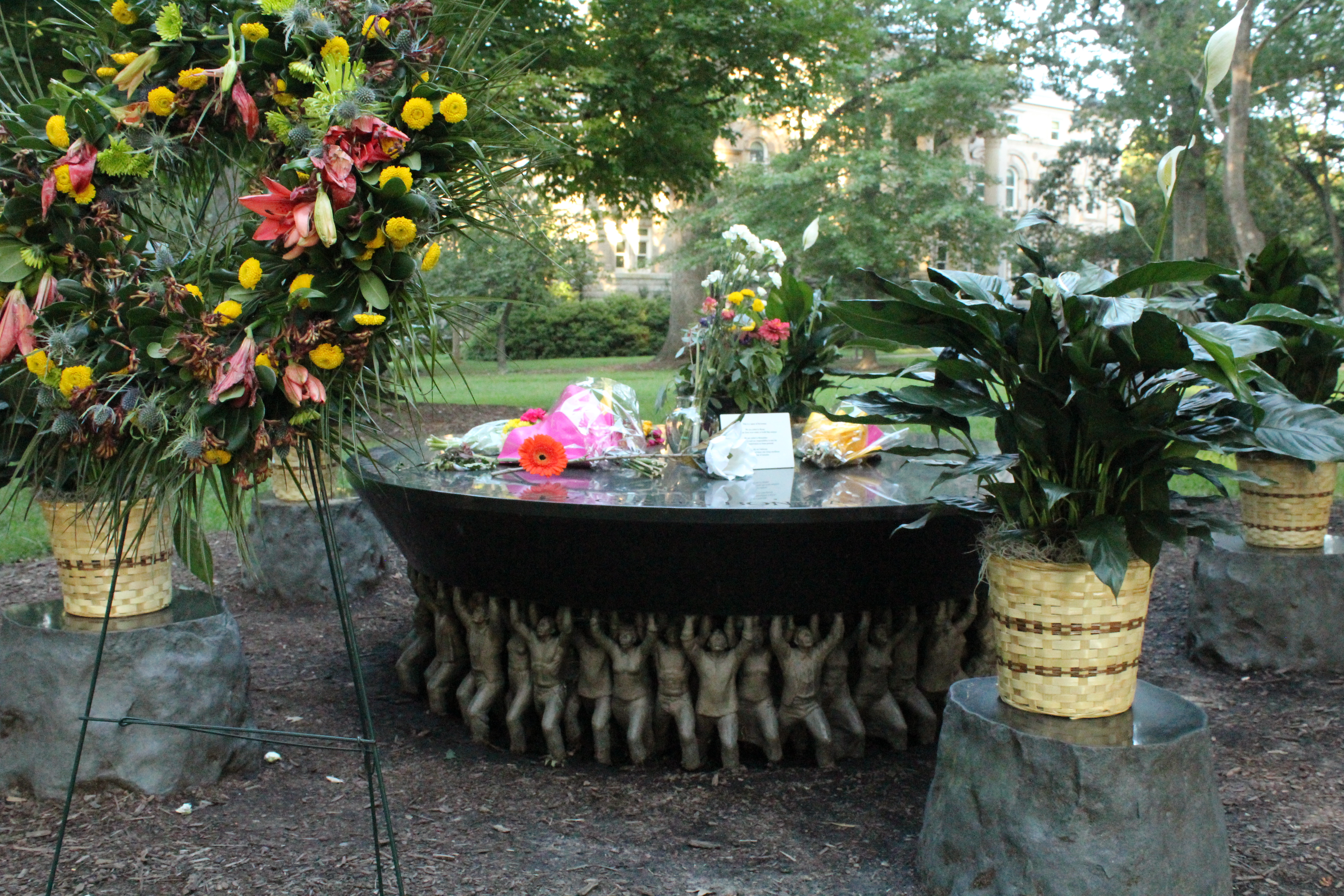
The memorial in 2018

The Installation of the Unsung Founders memorial occurred on May 11, 2005 and the dedication ceremony was held on November 5, 2005. The ceremony was held at 10 a.m. at the site of the memorial on McCorkle Place quadrangle in front of the Alumni Building, near Franklin Street, on the Carolina campus. The ceremony featured speakers including UNC Chancellor James Moeser and Dr. Bernadette Gray-Little, dean of the UNC College of Arts and Science, as well as 2002 senior class officers Ben Singer and Byron Wilson. Moeser said:

What we do today will not rectify what our ancestors did in the past, But this memorial, I believe, attests to our commitment to shed light on the darker corners of our history. Yes, the University's first leaders were slaveholders. It is also true that the contributions of African American servants and slaves were crucial to its success.

Moeser commented that the memorial did not emerge from some committee of campus administrators or panel of faculty experts, but "arose from the inspiration of our students." Furthermore, "The Class of 2002 voted overwhelmingly in favor of creating this as their senior class gift. They voted overwhelmingly to make an honest judgment on difficult events." He went on to state:

Suh's creation here on McCorkle Place is a splendid piece. One thing that has struck me is how it not only captures the spirit of the senior class's intent, but provides a functional space that passersby already have embraced. Students sit here to study notes before class, spreading their books across the tabletop. Others come to enjoy a picnic lunch. In fact, this piece does for us what the people it honors did for us — that is, makes Carolina a better place to be.

Gray-Little added that "One of the troublesome legacies of slavery is the pall that it casts over the family histories of those who were bought and sold, This monument finally recognizes the many unnamed whose toil and talent made the nation's first public university possible."

== Vandalism ==
In September 2019, Ryan Barnett and Nancy McCorkle were found guilty in Orange County Court, of damaging property for vandalism at the monument in March 2019. The following were written with markers on the monument: "Fuck this monument!!!" "Destroy this monument to racism!!!" "Confederate lives matter!!!" "Yankee go home, antifa sucks." "Racist—faggots—niger [sic]."

== See also ==
- Silent Sam
- Speaker Ban Memorial
