= Francis Preston Venable =

American chemist and educator

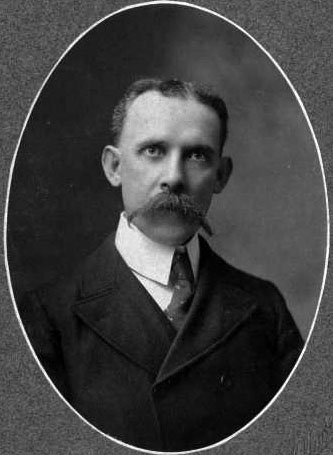
- Born: November 17, 1856; Farmville, Virginia, U.S.
- Died: March 17, 1934 (aged 77); Richmond, Virginia, U.S.
- Education: University of Virginia; University of Göttingen
- Occupations: Chemist, Educator
- Known for: 9th President of the University of North Carolina
- Term: 1900-1913
- Predecessor: Edwin Anderson Alderman
- Successor: Edward Kidder Graham
- Spouse: Sallie Charlton Manning

Francis Preston Venable (November 17, 1856 – March 17, 1934) was a chemist, educator, and president of the University of North Carolina (UNC).

== Biography ==
Born “near Farmville", Prince Edward County, Virginia to Charles Scott Venable, aide-de-camp to Gen. Robert E. Lee from 1862 to 1865 and professor of mathematics at the University of Virginia from 1865 to 1896, and Margaret Cantey (McDowell) Venable.

In 1879, Venable earned a master's degree in chemistry from the University of Virginia. He was offered the chair in the chemistry department at UNC in 1880. A year later, he earned a Ph.D. in chemistry from the University of Göttingen, and was elected fellow of the Chemical Society of London.

In 1893, Venable occupied the first endowed chair at UNC, the Mary Ann Smith Professorship. In collaboration with undergraduate students William R. Kenan, Jr. and Thomas Clarke and former student John Motley Morehead III, he identified calcium carbide, a discovery of great commercial importance that led to the development of acetylene and the founding of Union Carbide. In 1899, he was elected vice president of the chemistry section of the American Association for the Advancement of Science.

Venable served as president of UNC from 1900 to 1914. He took a one-year leave of absence due to illness in 1914, during which time Edward Kidder Graham served as acting president. In 1905, he was elected president of the American Chemical Society, a member of the American Philosophical Society, and he served as president of the Southern Association of Colleges and Schools. Venable resigned as president of UNC in 1914, was appointed Kenan Professor in 1918, and retired from teaching in 1930.

Venable was married to Sallie Charlton Manning in 1884, with whom he had 5 children. He died from pneumonia in Richmond, Virginia on March 17, 1934, and was buried in the Old Chapel Hill Cemetery.

== Published works ==
- A Course in Qualitative Chemical Analysis (1883)
- A Short History of Chemistry (1894)
- The Development of the Periodic Law (1896)
- Inorganic Chemistry (1898)
- A Brief Account of Radio-Activity (1917)
- Zirconium and Its Compounds (1922)
