= Black Student Movement =

The Black Student Movement (BSM) is an organization at the University of North Carolina at Chapel Hill. It is the second largest student-run organization and one of the largest cultural organizations on the school's campus. The organization was created on November 7, 1967, to combat problems of black recruit, admissions, and integration on UNC-CH campus.

== History ==
The Black Student Movement was established on November 7, 1967, as a result Black student dissatisfaction with the NAACP chapter on the campus and because of the slow enrollment of the black population on campus. In 1961 the NAACP chapter had been formed and had actively protested against segregation and discrimination, but by 1967 more militant students led by Preston Dobbins and Reggie Hawkins felt that the NAACP was overly conservative. They voted to disband the chapter and instead form the Black Student Movement. The NAACP's magazine, The Crisis, reported that the chapter president, Kelly Alexander Jr., opposed demands for separate facilities for black students, arguing against "any attempt to re-establish institutionalized segregation". The state NAACP leadership intervened and the two organizations then co-existed. Although the organization had white sympathizers, it was all-black. The Black Student Movement was officially recognized by the UNC administration in December 1967. In the fall of 1967, UNC reported 113 African American Students enrolled out of 13,352.

The Black Student Movement began taking form as the dominant organization who voiced the views and opinions of black students at the university. The ensuing year was momentous black students on the campus because it was within this time frame that the Dixon Resolution and the Phipps Committee were established. The Dixon Resolution, written by Professor John Dixon on May 3, 1968, requested that the chancellor appoint a five-person committee to generate recommendations for the faculty to help improve the academic climate among Black students. It was the Phillips Committee, led by Professor Dickson Phillips, that recommended an eight-step plan to improve the intellectual climate and remove educational disabilities on the basis of the race of Black students on campus and those to come.

On December 11, 1968, the Black Student Movement presented a list of 23 demands to J. Carlyle Sitterson (chancellor at the time) for improvements that they needed to see implemented, including better treatment of the campus workforce and more opportunity and representation at the university for African American students and members of the Chapel Hill community. The demands included the founding of an African-American Studies department at the university, an office titled, "Dean of Black Students" that would be responsive to black students' needs, and the university’s partnership with the local black community. On January 24, 1969, six weeks after being presented with the demands and during final exam periods, Sitterson issued a nineteen-page written reply, demonstrating his intent "to be responsive to the educational needs of...all races, colors and creeds" while also asserting that the university cannot, in policy or practice, provide unique treatment for any single race, color or creed", but promised open discussion and the establishment of a faculty-student committee based on minorities and the disadvantaged. Within the following weeks, BSM gained support from students and faculty through the Southern Student Organizing Committee (SSOC), the UNC Graduate Student Association, The Daily Tar Heel, and the New University Conference. Students and faculty alike felt as though the chancellor's response was dismissive and organized sit-ins. UNC faculty members organized a petition supporting the BSM. The SSOC organized a protest through the university, the town, and South Building in support of the BSM’s demands on February 7, 1969. The Chapel Hill community became nervous, given the student takeover of Allen administrative building at Duke University on February 13, 1969, which led to conflicts with students and the police who fired tear gas to control the crowd. The BSM held a rally on February 8 to discuss Chancellor Sitterson’s responses to their demands. Athletes Charlie Scott, the first black basketball player at the university, and Bill Chamberlain attended this rally and publicly supported the BSM.

=== BSM and food workers ===
A partnership between black students and food workers began in December 1968, after the BSM presented their demands. Amongst these demands was the urging of the university to "begin working immediately to alleviate the intolerable working conditions of the Black non-academic employees". The food workers wanted to address the low wages, lack of holding supervisors accountable, and some sexual harassment claims. They believed that their “supervisors who worked for the University were engaging in unfair labor practices.” Provoked by Sitterson's response to their demands, BSM met with food workers to address employee grievances. With encouragement from BSM core members, Preston Dobbins, Reggie Hawkins, Jack McLean and Eric Clay, the food workers remained determined to be taken seriously by administration.

After a conflict with workers and a supervisor, the workers met with the BSM to plan a protest that Sunday. On February 23, 1969, food workers came to work and set up their counters. When the doors were opened, workers walked out and sat down at cafeteria tables. BSM recruited about 400 students to stand in line and bang their trays on the counters. The following morning, nearly 100 dining hall employees refused to report to work, forcing 3 of the 4 dining facilities to close for the day. The protest would continue to last for almost a month marking UNC's first serious labor dispute. The protest was supported by the BSM, students (high school and college), faculty, community members, even people from other schools.

Upset with the lack of response from administration, particularly the chancellor, on Monday, March 3, 1969 the BSM partnering with Southern Students Organizing Committee changed their tactics, taking a more authoritative stance entering Lenoir and slowing down service to students. Their actions tried to force administration to deal with the issue. During the protest, the BSM, SSOC, and other students ran through Lenoir flipping tables, which forced police with riot gear to intervene. As a result, the administration closed Lenoir. In a meeting with Governor Robert W. Scott, Chancellor Sitterson and UNC System president William C. Friday argued to keep Lenoir Hall closed until Thursday lunch and downplayed the need to bring in the highway patrol to maintain order. As Sitterson prepared to announce his plan for reopening Lenoir, Governor Scott declared that four National Guard units were standing by in Durham, and that five squads of riot-trained highway patrol were being sent to Chapel Hill to ensure that Lenoir would open for breakfast on Thursday, March 6.

Many UNC students, white and black, and faculty were mobilized by the table-turning incident and the governor's response. The SSOC, the National Student Association Southern Area Conference, and representatives from Student Government attempted to act as mediators between the black students and food workers on one side and the university administration and North Carolina General Assembly on the other. Though the Faculty Council resolved to support the university administration, some faculty members signed petitions calling on Sitterson to recognize the validity of the BSM's demands and to increase wages and opportunities for promotion for campus non-academic workers.

During the protest, the BSM and food workers occupied Manning Hall, the former law school building. Workers created the “Soul Food Cafeteria” as a way to earn money and support the community. The BSM gave the food in exchange for donations from those who participated in the “Soul Food Cafeteria.” They were able to raise $35 per worker per week with this system.

On 13 March, the governor directed Chapel Hill police to arrest BSM members who refused to leave Manning Hall, which was then otherwise unused. Those arrested retained Charlotte attorneys Julius Chambers and Adam Stein to represent them.Ultimately, the UNC Non-Academic Employees Union was formed and its requests were prioritized: a minimum wage of $1.80 per hour, the appointment of a black supervisor, and time-and-a-half for overtime work. The strike came to an end on March 21, 1969, “when Gov. Scott agreed to pass legislation that would raise not only the Lenoir workers’ wages to $1.80 an hour, but also the wages of all other minimum wage workers across the state.”

=== Uprisings and strikes ===
During 1968, the Movement staged several protest marches following the Orangeburg Massacre and the assassination of Martin Luther King that featured the burning of an effigy of Governor Robert McNair and the Confederate flag, followed by a one-day strike with 95% adherence from black workers.

In March of 1969 along with the Southern Student Organizing Committee (SSOC), picketed alongside workers and boycotted the dining halls in solidarity. Faculty picketed as well, carrying signs that said "Faculty Supports Lenoir Workers". During the second strike, in November and December 1969, students from Black Student Movement chapters across the state planned to convene in Chapel Hill for "Black Monday" for a rally in support of the strikers. The police attacked a group of demonstrators from the Black Student Movement who allegedly refused to disperse from their picket lines. Nine people were arrested, including two union organizers. Charges included failure to disperse and disorderly conduct.

In November 1969, the BSM created the Black Ink newspaper as a counter to the Daily Tar Heel (DTH) student newspaper of the campus. The DTH was seen as a newspaper for white students. Therefore, Black Ink was created to represent the black community and black interests.

In January 1965, the BSM protested against guest speaker David Duke, the founder of the Knights of the Ku Klux Klan. Almost 200 students heckled and shouted at him, forcing him off the stage. Algenon Marbley, BSM president at the time, “was summoned to Undergraduate Court for allegedly leading the protest but was acquitted.”

In 1979, students were angry with the denying of tenure for Dr. Sonja Stone, the head of the African and Afro-American Studies department and BSM’s advisor. They held sit-ins and marched through South Building to protest the “closed-door” policy making. BSM further protested the minimal admittance of qualified African Americans into the university and that there was still not an office specific for minority concerns. Dr. Sonja Stone received tenure in the fall of 1980 and the Office of Minority Affairs was formed.

In October 1990 a sculpture, The Student Body, was installed to be representative of the UNC student body. Many students felt that the depictions of the characters were unrealistic. The statue showed a black woman balancing books on her head, a white woman looking up a man, and a black man with a basketball. BSM organized a study-in, where students studied around the statue showing what the student body actually looks like.

After the passing of Dr. Sonja Stone in 1991, the BSM protested to have a free standing academic building named after her to replace the Black Cultural Center. They gained support from students, faculty, student athletes, and Spike Lee. The building was approved in 1993 and was opened in 2004.

On November 14, 1998, to commemorate the BSM's 30th anniversary, students rallied in support of the Housekeeper and Groundskeeper Struggle, and presented Chancellor Michael Hooker with a list of 22 new demands.

On March 28, 2012 BSM, along with other student organizations, marched down Franklin Street in hoodies, Skittles, and tea in hand in response to the murder of an unarmed Trayvon Martin. It was a silent march that was used to inform people of the case and honor his life.

=== BSM Evolves ===
The Black Student Movement, commonly referred to as BSM has the mission: "We, the members of the Black Student Movement, embrace a culture distinct from the dominant culture found at the University of North Carolina at Chapel Hill. In view of this fact, it is the goal of this organization to strive for the continued existence of the unity among all its members, to voice the concerns and grievances of its members to the University, to offer outlets for expressing Black ideals and culture, and finally, to insure that the Black Student Movement members never lose contact with the Black community".

In November 1997, students on campus still felt as though their voices were not being heard. BSM presented Chancellor Michael Hooker with a list of concerns. The presentation coincided with BSM Awareness Day, remembering those who began the fight for equality thirty years earlier. On Friday afternoon, students presented readings, music and poetry to make the campus community aware of their cause. At the conclusion of their events, the students marched to the Officer of Chancellor Hooker and presented him with a list of demands. They presented 22 demands that were not different from the ones presented to Chancellor Sitterson in 1968, however there was an additional demand for a black cultural center on campus.

One of the demands presented at the second round was a free-standing black cultural center. When professor Sonja Haynes Stone died of a stroke in 1991, BSM members voiced their dissatisfaction with the small black cultural center in the Student Union and pushed for a freestanding building dedicated to the late professor.But former Chancellor Paul Hardin said the center should be "a forum and not a fortress," and the Black Cultural Center's suite in the Union was dedicated to Stone. After more than a decade of fundraising and rallying, BSM members were able to see the dedication of a freestanding Sonja Haynes Stone Center for Black Culture and History.

In addition to advocating for the minority voice, in recent years, the BSM has made an effort to promote change and voter participation. In 2009, the political action committee of BSM presented "Vote and Vote Smart", to encourage political participation.

The group presented the event in conjunction with the local chapter of the National Association for the Advancement of Colored People and the group United with the Northside Community Now.

BSM also has focused the 2011 year on self-identity, hosting "Same by Race, Different by Name", a panel discussion on identity in the black community as well as an in-depth look at stereotypes about Africans and American Americans and their relationship with one another.

BSM continues to encourage their subcommittee involvement from hosting Gospel Choir concerts, Harmonyx Acapella performances, and the BSM Ball, where they crown a Mr. and Ms. BSM. They also began partnership with other campus organizations to promote unity. BSM hosts “Culture on the Lawn” with Carolina For The Kids (CFTK) and the Homecoming Kickoff Powderpuff Game with Carolina Fever. The goal of unity allows for more cooperation and fluidity with “black issues.” For example, the Black Lives Matter movement gained support from many black students within BSM and outside of it. BSM supports the protests that occur on campus without having to lead the protests.

The “We Gon Be Alright Scholarship” was created by Miss BSM (2015-2016) Summer Holmes. The name of the scholarship comes from lyrics by Kendrick Lamar, which has become an anthem for the Black Lives Matter Movement. The mission of the scholarship is to award “underclassmen scholarship money based on their commitment to service and activism within and outside the Carolina community” and “to highlight the valiant efforts of those who have enacted change for the betterment of their constituents during times of institutional injustices and the disenfranchisement of minority populations.”

== See also ==
- Black Action Movement, University of Michigan
