= WCOM-LP =

Community radio station in Carrboro, North Carolina

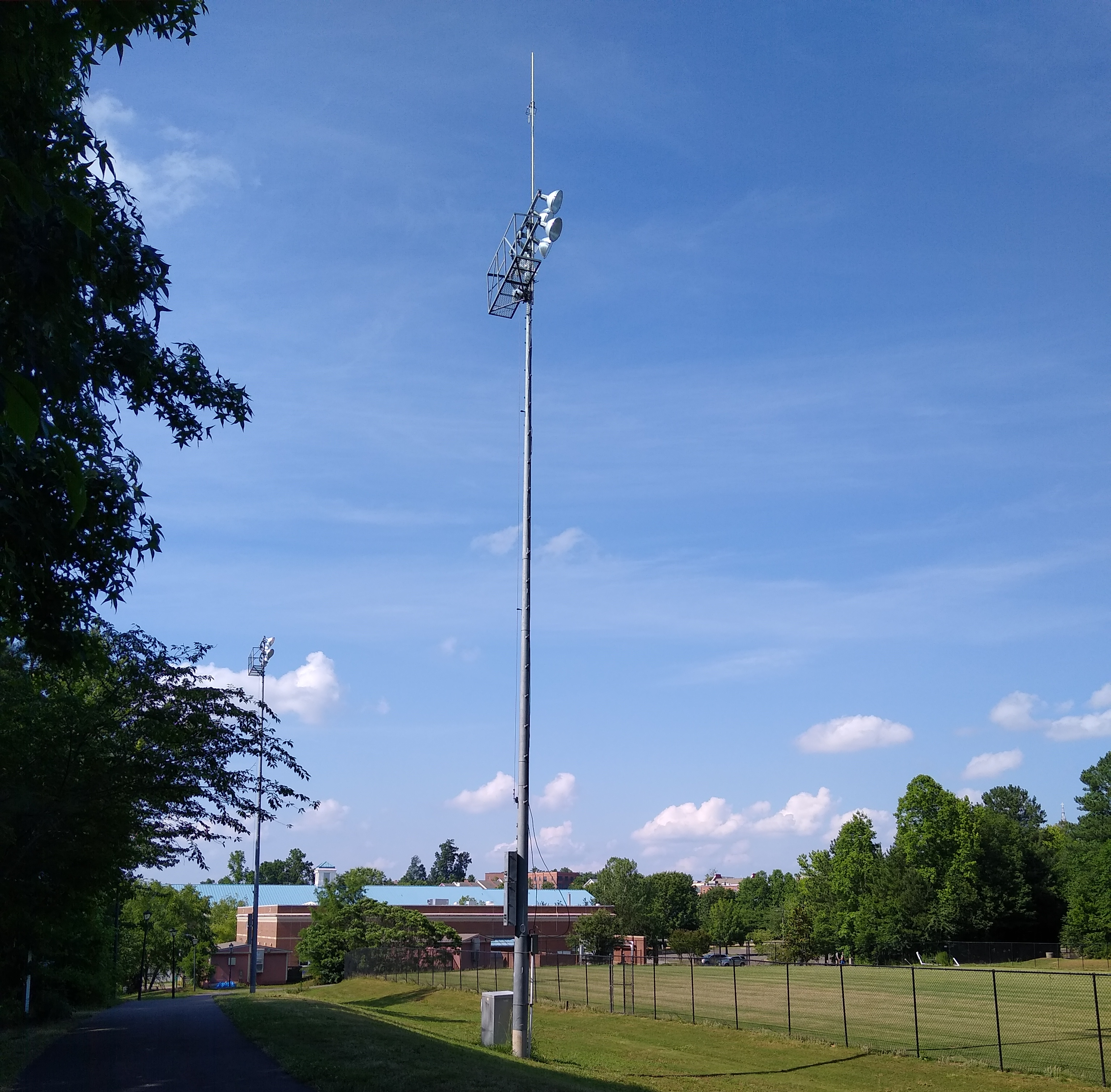
- WCOM-LP broadcast tower at Mary Scroggs Elementary School
- Chapel Hill, North Carolina; United States
- Broadcast area: Carrboro, North Carolina
- Frequency: 103.5 MHz

Programming
- Format: Variety
- Affiliations: Pacifica Radio

Ownership
- Owner: Public Gallery of Carrboro, Inc.

History
- First air date: September 9, 2004
- Call sign meaning: Community

Technical information
- Licensing authority: FCC
- Facility ID: 135187
- Class: L1
- ERP: 100 watts
- HAAT: 27.7 meters (91 ft)
- Transmitter coordinates: 35°52′38.5″N 79°4′8″W

Links
- Public license information: LMS
- Webcast: https://audio-mp3.ibiblio.org/wcom-hifi.mp3
- Website: wcomfm.org

WCOM-LP is a community low-power FM radio station, broadcasting from Carrboro, North Carolina. It broadcasts from a radio tower over Mary Scroggs Elementary School soccer field in Chapel Hill, North Carolina, and airs a variety format.. The station's studios are located in Carrboro at 300-G E. Main Street, near the Cat's Cradle. WCOM-LP is the first low-power FM station in the area, and began broadcasting in June 2004. In November 2004, the station began broadcasting a full lineup of local radio programming, including some Spanish language programming.

WCOM-LP is the first low-power FM community radio station in the area to be set up under a program established by the Federal Communications Commission (FCC) in 2000. The station was assigned the WCOM-LP call letters by the FCC on February 5, 2003.

== History ==
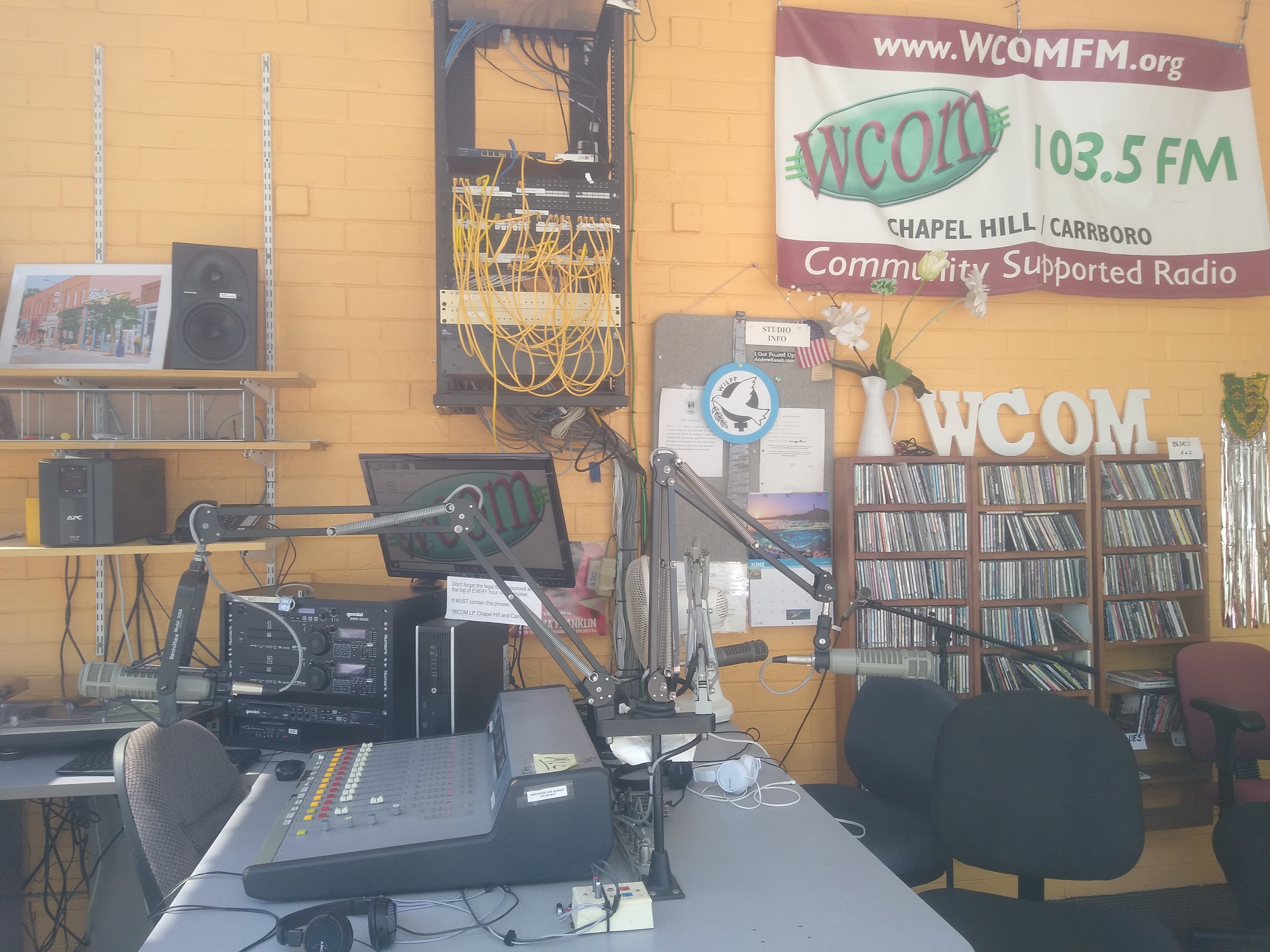
WCOM studio

WCOM originally planned to set up a broadcasting tower on the roof of the Southern Village branch of Weaver Street Market, then at Culbreth Middle School, but the first location was blocked by the city government and the second location was blocked by the FCC. Ultimately, the antenna was added to the top of a light pole at Scroggs Elementary School.

In June 2004, WCOM-LP "began broadcasting a test signal—a 30-minute loop in English and Spanish explaining the goals of the station. Since the technology was not yet in place to link the studio to the transmitter, that test signal came from a CD cabinet at the base of the transmitter at Scroggs."

== See also ==
- List of community radio stations in the United States
