= Hollywood Theatre =

Hollywood Theatre or Hollywood Theater may refer to:

- Hollywood Theater (Minneapolis), Minnesota, listed on the U.S. National Register of Historic Places (NRHP)
- Hollywood Theater (Chapel Hill, NC)
- Hollywood Theatre (Portland, Oregon), NRHP-listed
- Hollywood Theater (Leavenworth, Kansas), listed on the NRHP in Leavenworth County
- Hollywood Theatre (Las Vegas), at the MGM Grand Las Vegas
- Hollywood Theater (Los Angeles), the oldest theater in Hollywood and a contributing building to the Hollywood Boulevard Commercial and Entertainment District
- Hollywood Theatre (New York City), the original name of the Mark Hellinger Theatre
- Hollywood Theatre (Toronto), Toronto's first cinema built to show "talkies"

== See also ==
- Hollywood Cinema (New Zealand theatre)
