= Chapel Hill Transit =

Public transportation service in North Carolina, US

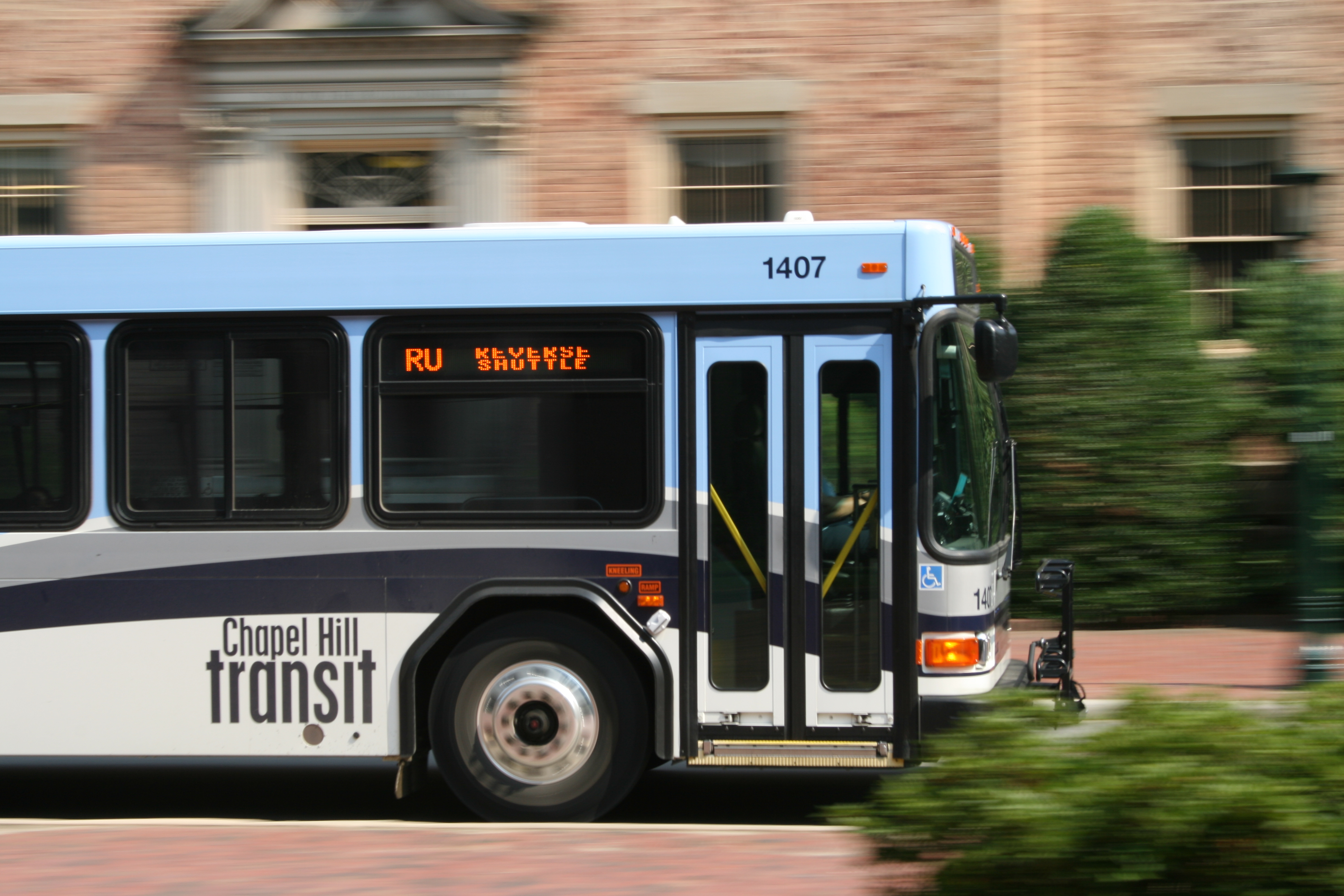
- Founded: 1974
- Headquarters: 6900 Millhouse Road; Chapel Hill, North Carolina
- Service area: Chapel Hill, Carrboro, and UNC
- Service type: bus service, paratransit
- Routes: 24
- Fleet: 105
- Daily ridership: 12,900 (weekdays, Q2 2026)
- Annual ridership: 4,305,300 (2025)
- Website: chtransit.org

Chapel Hill Transit operates public bus and van transportation services within the contiguous municipalities of Chapel Hill and Carrboro and the campus of the University of North Carolina at Chapel Hill in the southeast corner of Orange County in the Research Triangle metropolitan region of North Carolina. Chapel Hill Transit operates its fixed route system fare free due to a contractual agreement with the two towns and the university to share annual operating and capital costs. In 2025, the system had a ridership of 4,305,300, or about 12,900 per weekday as of the second quarter of 2026.

== History ==
A public transportation system serving Chapel Hill was suggested in 1965-66, when a member of the town's governing body, then called the Board of Alderman, proposed establishing transit service. Mayoral candidate Howard Lee made establishment of a bus system one of his priorities during his 1969 campaign, and moved to implement the system shortly after wining election as mayor. A trial system was implemented in 1970, but a town referendum to implement a permanent system failed by one vote in 1971. A subsequent study funded by the Urban Mass Transportation Administration (now the Federal Transit Administration) recommended establishment of a system funded by the towns and universities, and a 1973 town referendum was successful in Chapel Hill, garnering about 65 percent support. Service for the new Chapel Hill Community Transit system began on August 1, 1974.

Ridership History 2011-2026

In 1992, Chapel Hill Transit teamed up with the Triangle Clean Cities Coalition and Ebus, a California company that manufactures electric buses, to demonstrate a 22-passenger bus that promised cleaner air and reduced dependence on foreign fuels. This vehicle demonstration followed an earlier one arranged by the Public Transportation Division of the North Carolina Department of Transportation. In the earlier demonstration, a Transteq hybrid bus was transported from daily use in Denver, Colorado, and made available for test drives on the Chapel Hill Transit lot. In 2002, Chapel Hill Transit inaugurated fare-free service, allowing passengers to take trips without paying a fare on the bus. The fare-fee bus operations are funded through Chapel Hill and Carrboro town taxes, federal grants, and UNC student fees. In February 2006, K. Stephen Spade, a former Des Moines Metropolitan Transit Authority employee, was hired as the transportation director for the Town of Chapel Hill. The current director is Brian Litchfield, who served as assistant director under Spade beginning in 2008 before assuming his role in 2013.

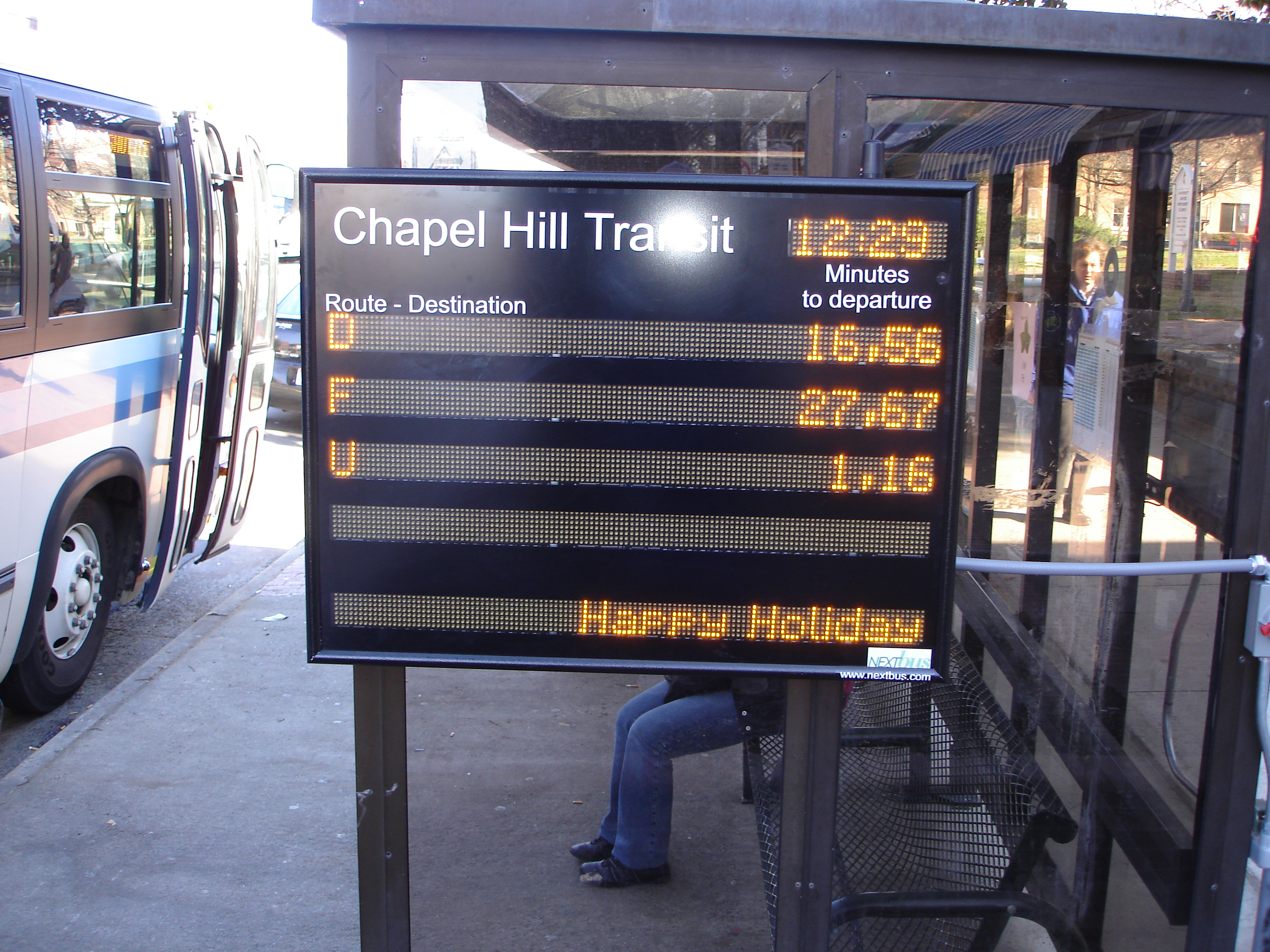
Digitized signs showing the estimated arrival times of buses.

In August 2006, Chapel Hill Transit announced that their buses will be equipped with GPS tracking devices, allowing the bus riders to check the arrival time of the buses using the internet and their cell phone. The project was completed by NextBus Inc. Fourteen bus stops would also have digitized signs showing the estimated arrival times of buses. These signs were controversial, as the cost of installing them was almost $1 million.

In September 2006, Chapel Hill Transit announced plans to begin purchasing hybrid buses. The town planned to buy as many as nineteen new buses: three hybrids, several extra-long and the rest standard size. In October 2006, the Chapel Hill Town Council approved the purchase of sixteen new Chapel Hill Transit buses at a cost of $5.8 million from Gillig Corp. Federal grants provided about $5.2 million, and the town provided approximately $600,000 in local funds. Three of these sixteen new buses are diesel-electric hybrids. The buses, delivered in July 2007, expanded the system and replaced older buses. The town had an additional $1.7 million in federal funding which was sufficient to purchase four 60-foot articulated buses.

== Fixed route service ==
The Chapel Hill Transit system consists of 20 routes, however, during weekends, only 9 routes run. 3 of the weekday routes are considered express routes and are designated with an X. The basic hours of operation are from early morning to evening. Connections to GoTriangle, Orange County Transportation Authority, and PART are available at Manning Drive. Each fixed-route vehicle is equipped with a bike rack, which can take two bikes, and Wi-Fi.

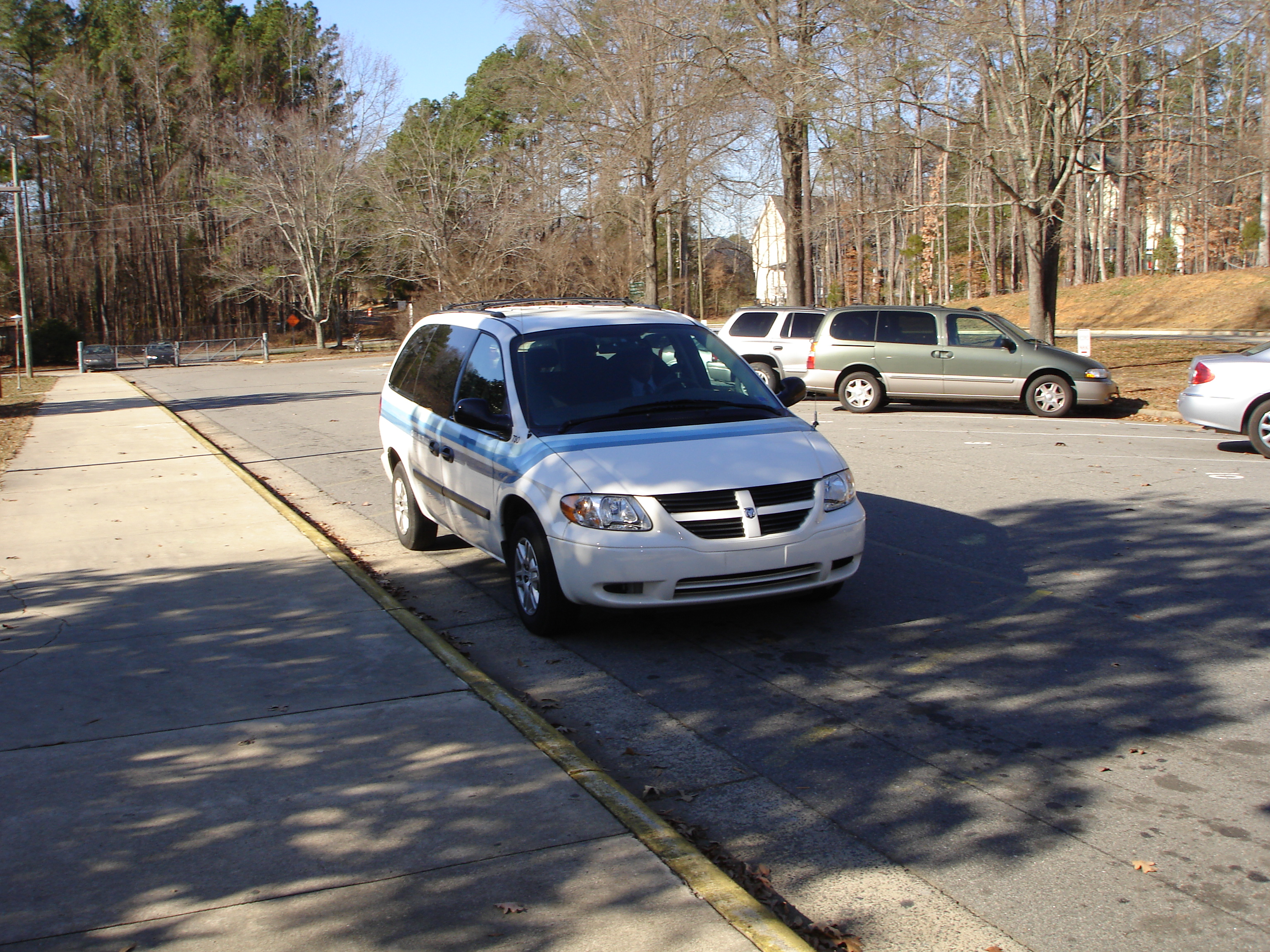
The Shared Ride Feeder service is available for passengers from areas that do not receive regular bus service.

A Senior Shuttle route operates weekdays making 7 stops each hour, in a loop, to destinations in Chapel Hill and Carrboro. The Senior Shuttle route uses alternative vehicles to accommodate passengers with restricted mobility.

All fixed routes and special service routes are fare free. The Tar Heel Express charges a $3 one way and $5 round trip fee for rides.

=== Route list ===
Route	Destinations			Name origin
A	Colonial Heights Weiner St	↔	University Place	to Airport Drive (Note: Following a 2020 redesign, the G no longer goes to Glen Lennox (now served by the A) and the A no longer goes through Airport Drive (now served by G), but the names have been kept)
B	UNC-Chapel Hill Mason Farm Rd	↔	Ronald McDonald House	to Baity Hill
C	UNC-Chapel Hill Pittsboro St at Credit Union	↔	Smith Level Rd BPW Club Rd	to Culbreth
CL	UNC-Chapel Hill East Dr at Jackson Circle	↔	Old Sterling Dr Eastowne Dr	to Colony Lake
CM	UNC-Chapel Hill Pittsboro St at Credit Union	↔	Jones Ferry Park & Ride	to Carrboro and Merritt Mill
CW	UNC-Chapel Hill Pittsboro St at Credit Union	↔	NC-54 Old Fayetteville Rd	to Carrboro West
D	UNC-Chapel Hill East Dr at Jackson Circle	↔	Old Chapel Hill Rd Huse St	towards Durham
F	Colony Woods Dr Overland Drive	↔	Jones Ferry Park & Ride	along Franklin
G	UNC-Chapel Hill Manning Drive	↔	Booker Creek Apartments	to Glen Lennox (Note: Following a 2020 redesign, the G no longer goes to Glen Lennox (now served by the A) and the A no longer goes through Airport Drive (now served by G), but the names have been kept.)
HS	E Franlin St Varsity Theater	↔	Morris Groove Elementary	to High School
J	UNC-Chapel Hill Pittsboro St at Credit Union	↔	Rock Haven Road	to Jones Ferry Road
N	Estes Park Apartments	↔	Friday Center Park & Ride	to North (Note: Following a 2020 redesign, the N no longer serves the North, and now covers the Friday Center that used to be covered by the decommissioned V)
NS	Eubanks Road Park & Ride	↔	Southern Village Park & Ride	North to South
NU	UNC-Chapel Hill Manning Drive	↔	RR Lot Park & Ride	North to University
S	UNC-Chapel Hill S Columbia St at South Rd	↔	Friday Center Park & Ride	to South
T	UNC-Chapel Hill S Columbia St at South Rd	↔	E. Chapel Hill High School Weaver Dairy Rd	to Timberlyne
U	UNC Loop Shuttle			University loop
RU	UNC Loop Shuttle			Reverse University loop
Express routes | Rush hours only
CCX	UNC-Chapel Hill Manning Drive	↔	Chatham County Park & Ride	Chatham County Express
FCX	UNC-Chapel Hill Manning Drive	↔	Friday Center Park & Ride	Friday Center Express
JFX	UNC-Chapel Hill Manning Drive	↔	Jones Ferry Road Park & Ride	Jones Ferry Express
GoTriangle routes operated by Chapel Hill Transit
420	Chapel Hill	↔	Hillsborough	GoTriangle 400s

==== Safe Ride service ====
The Safe Ride program is funded by the University of North Carolina to provide safe overnight service while UNC Chapel Hill is in session. It only runs on Tuesdays, Fridays, and Saturdays. 3 "Safe Ride" routes operate on Thursday, Friday, and Saturday late evenings when the university is in session. They all start in the Varsity Theater in E Franklin Street.

Route	Destination		
J	Varsity Theater	↔	The Village Apartments
G	Varsity Theater	↔	Friday Center Park & Ride
T	Varsity Theater	↔	Westminster Circle

==== Tar Heel Express shuttles ====
Chapel Hill Transit operates a "Tar Heel Express" special event shuttle service for UNC Football and Men's Basketball home games, in addition to special events. The shuttles provide continuous and fully accessible service, running every 10 to 15 minutes between the park and rides and Kenan Memorial Stadium or Dean E. Smith Center. Service ends 45 minutes after the game ends.

Pick-up locations	Begins
Friday Center	1.5 hours before game time
Southern Village	2 hours before game time
Downtown Chapel Hill	1.5 hours before game time

=== Discontinued routes ===
Designation	Route	End date	Replacement route(s)
CPX	Carrboro Plaza Express	August 3, 2020	CW
HU	UNC Hospitals/NC 54 Park & Ride/Hedrick Building	August 3, 2020	B
V	Southern Village/Meadowmont	August 3, 2020	N

== Paratransit ==
A fare-free "EZ Rider" paratransit service provides a demand-responsive transit service for the handicapped and elderly that are unable to use the regular fixed route service. The service operates from morning to evening on weekdays and on Saturdays. Advanced reservations and enrollment are required.

== Park & Ride ==
Chapel Hill Transit operates three Park & Ride lots throughout Chapel Hill and Carrboro. Parking fees are $2/day and can be paid using an on-site meter or the Parkmobile app. Monthly and annual permits are available for $21/month and $250/year. The University of North Carolina operates four other Park & Ride lots. Permitting for these lots is administered through the university's Commuter Alternatives Program (CAP) Office. UNC's Park & Ride lots are for UNC Employees and Students only; no public/daily parking is available. UNC Park & Ride permits are honored in all Chapel Hill Transit Park & Ride lots.

=== Chapel Hill Transit Park & Ride lots ===
Lot	Location	Served By	Parkmobile Zone
Eubanks Road	On Eubanks Rd, 1/2 mi west of MLK Jr Blvd	NS & CRX (GoTriangle)	8801
Jones Ferry	Just south of Old Fayetteville Rd and Jones Ferry Rd	CM, F, & JFX	8802
Southern Village	Just off US 15-501 South	NS	8804

=== UNC Park & Ride lots ===
Lot	Location	Served By
Friday Center	On Friday Center Dr and NC 54	FCX
MLK Jr Blvd	725 MLK Jr. Blvd	G, NS, T
NC 54 East	Friday Center Dr and NC 54	S
Chatham County	US 15-501 near Old Lystra	CCX

== Bus Rapid Transit ==
Chapel Hill Transit is planning to build an 8.2-mile (13.2 km) North-South Bus Rapid Transit (NSBRT) to run from the Eubanks Road Park & Ride lot to Southern Village. The route follows NC 86 (MLK Jr. Blvd.) from the northern edge of Chapel Hill into downtown, then follows Columbia St through the campus of UNC-Chapel Hill, and continues along US 15-501 to Southern Village. The proposed route is based on the NS route which consistently has the highest ridership of all routes. Projected cost is $96-105.9 million with $50-75 million provided by federal funding, to commence passenger service in 2028 and projected 12,000 daily trips (in 2040) with an annual operating cost of $3.4 million. The NSBRT will run every 8 minutes during peak hours and every 10-20 minutes in off-peak hours. The existing NS bus route is expected to be replaced by the NSBRT. Along most of the corridor, NSBRT will operate in dedicated lanes.

=== Proposed BRT stations ===
1. Eubanks Park & Ride
2. Weaver Dairy Road
3. New Parkside
4. Northfield
5. Piney Mountain
6. Estes
7. Hillsborough
8. Franklin
9. Cameron (northbound)
10. Carrington Hall (northbound)
11. Pittsboro / Credit Union (southbound)
12. Manning / East
13. NC 54
14. Culbreth
15. Southern Village Park & Ride
