= Hollywood Theater (Chapel Hill) =

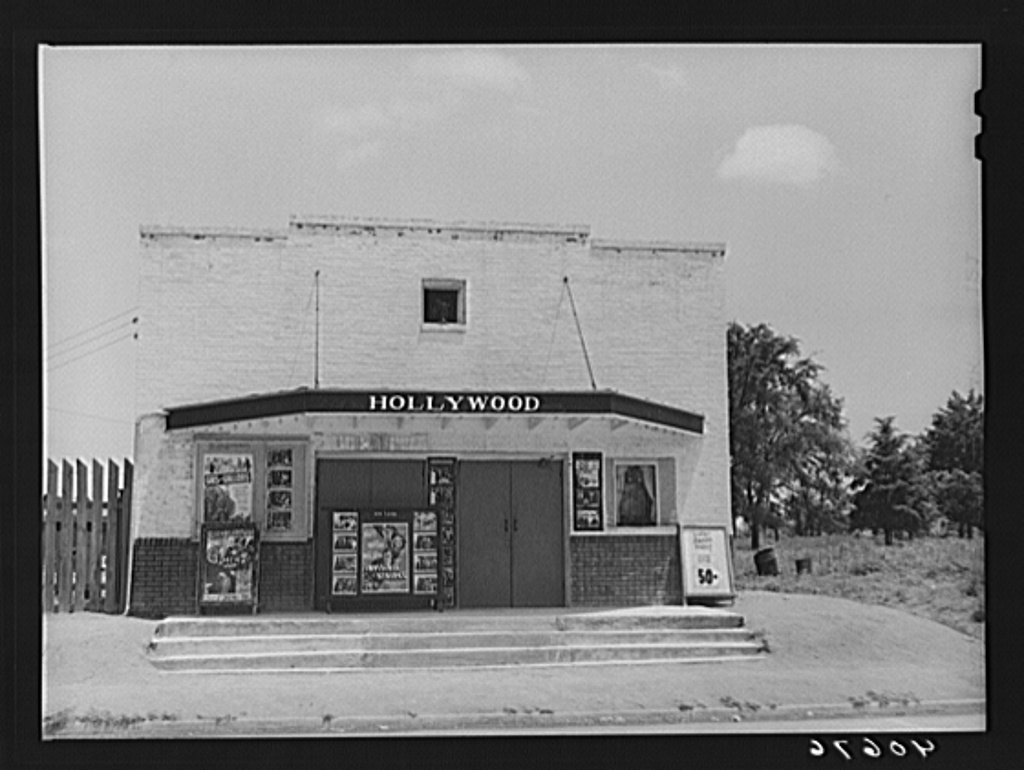
- The Hollywood Theater, May 1940
- Interactive map of Hollywood Theater
- Address: 405 E. Main Street, Carrboro, NC 27510; United States
- Coordinates: 35.910570°N 79.066260°W

The Hollywood Theater was a theater that primarily catered to Black patrons in Carrboro, North Carolina between 1939 and 1961. Open every day except for Sunday, the Hollywood Theater saw weekly attendance numbers between 1,300 and 1,500, including children and adults. The theater showed popular Hollywood movies as well as race films – films created for an African American audience featuring African American cast members.

== History ==
The Hollywood theater began operations in 1939 on East Main Street in Carrboro, North Carolina after E. Carrington Smith, the manager of the segregated Carolina Theater located on Franklin Street in Chapel Hill, saw a business opportunity in operating a local cinema. He appointed Kenneth Jones to be the manager of the theater. At the time, Hollywood Theater was one of three movie venues in the area open to Black patrons, the others being Durham's Carolina Theater and Wonderland Theater.

Following its establishment in 1939, the Hollywood Theater drove the once-popular Standard Theater out of business. The Standard Theater, which had been open since 1924, was owned and operated by African American entrepreneur, Durwood O’Kelly. The Hollywood Theater, as a white-owned business, sourced a great deal of their customers from the Standard Theater, proving to be the ultimate cause of its closure in the same year.

Hollywood Theater was known for showing popular films coming out of Hollywood as well as a collection of race films. First in 1939 and then again in 1941, the Hollywood had the opportunity to show documentaries of Chapel Hill's own Black community, some of which were shot by H. Lee Waters who traveled across North Carolina from 1936 to 1942 filming small communities. In his novel, The Moviegoer, southern author Walker Percy recounts his experience in Hollywood, writing that when someone sees a movie about their own neighborhood, it allows them to become a person who is Somewhere and not Anywhere.

By 1961, amid pressure to desegregate, Smith was forced to close the doors of the Hollywood Theater. He was still the owner of the more popular, all-white Carolina Theater only a few miles away, which was in the midst of gradually integrating. Starting with the admission of Black UNC students, the Carolina Theater eventually fully integrated on March 10, 1962, making it one of the first theaters in the South to do so.

== Civil Rights Significance ==
During the Civil Rights Movement, the Hollywood Theater served as a place for members of the Black community to gather. There was an overwhelmingly positive response to Black people having their own theater and being able to see themselves personified in a positive manner on screen, especially amidst a resurgence of the KKK. The decline of the Hollywood started as the Varsity Theater and Carolina Theater began to desegregate in April 1961. Starting with the admission of Black UNC students with IDs, the Varsity soon allowed all Black people to attend showings. The Carolina Theater followed suit not long after. The pressure of desegregation spreading rapidly throughout the state pushed white Chapel Hill to open all restaurants and other businesses to Black neighbors. This marked a turning point to the shrinking of the robust Black business district, a crucial economic source for the local Black community. Black people now had access to the other major theaters, so the smaller venue died out from a lack of revenue.

== Programming ==
The Hollywood Theater played a mix of blockbuster Hollywood films such as Tarzan, Shamble, and Gone with the Wind as well as lesser known films. These less accessible films catered to a Black audience, films that had Black directors and/or a predominantly Black cast. These films were often harder to acquire since they weren't as mass-produced as blockbuster Hollywood films. Herbert Lee Waters was a local filmmaker/photographer and shared his film collection at the Hollywood theater, one of which was Movies of Local People. The Movies of Local People was a collection of films that followed different North Carolina communities. One of the films in the collection shown at The Hollywood Theater followed Chapel Hill's local community. H. Lee Waters “...captured scenes of everyday life by setting up his equipment at gathering points like main intersections, schools and downtown”. The black-and-white silent film centered around local businesses and schools; the Orange County Training School, and Strowd Motor Company's Ford dealership, were featured in the film. It showcased the local community's daily routine, which was often the focus of Water's creations. Another popular film shown was The Ghost Breakers which starred the famous African-American actor Willie Best. Willie Best served as the focal point of the theater's advertisement program for the film, focusing on his role as an African American actor rather than highlighting the main white male actor, Bob Hope.

== Current Operations ==
The old Hollywood Theater became an art and antiques gallery on East Main Street. In addition, it had a monthly art display. The building became the headquarters of the national education organization Public Impact in 2013. In 2025, a fire devastated the building, leaving its future in question. In 2021, the Marian Cheek Jackson Center and the Chelsea Theater worked together to create a “Community Cinema” program for the Black community to continue sharing and collecting their living history. Eighty years after they were shown at the old Hollywood Theater, Chapel Hill residents gathered once more to watch the two film reels from 1939, Movies of Local People, that H. Lee Waters filmed in Chapel Hill.

== See also ==
- Desegregation of Movie Theaters in Durham, North Carolina
- African American Films
- African American Cinema
