= Thomas F. Lloyd =

American industrialist (1841-1911)

Thomas Franklin Lloyd (1 February 1841 – 24 May 1911) is one of the founders of Carrboro, North Carolina. He was a prominent North Carolina industrialist who built the Alberta Cotton Mill in 1898 in Carrboro; the former factory building is now home to the Carr Mill Mall.

He was part of a prominent family that settled in Orange County in the 1750-60s. After serving in the Confederate States Army during the Civil War in Company L, North Carolina 17th Infantry Regiment, Lloyd returned to his native Orange County. He quickly recognized the economic possibilities of the newly constructed State University Railroad in the town of West End, which is now known as Carrboro, and bought property adjacent to the railroad. There, Lloyd and a business partner, William Pritchard, built a steam-powered grist mill and cotton gin in 1883. This building, currently known as the Broad Street Building, still stands between Carr Mill Mall and the former railroad depot. In 1886, he bought out Pritchard's share in the grist mill and cotton gin, and had a flour mill built on the property.

In 1898, he built the Alberta Cotton Mill on the same property, spurring economic growth in the area. Lloyd had numerous mill houses built for his workers, some of which are still historic points of interest in the town.

In March 1909, North Carolina industrialist Julian S. Carr purchased the Alberta Cotton Mill from Lloyd. In February 1910, Lloyd, his brother Lueco, Isaac W. Pritchard, and W.S. Roberson formed a partnership and organized the Thomas F. Lloyd Manufacturing Company. They had a new mill constructed a few blocks south of the original Alberta Mill; construction was completed by mid-1911. This mill was also later purchased by Carr and the Durham Hosiery Mills.

Lloyd never learned to read or write until late in his life (having never received any formal education), though he displayed great business acumen and skill. At one point, Lloyd became the richest man in Carrboro and Chapel Hill. In 1885, Lloyd and his first wife, Caroline, purchased a brick, two-story antebellum home located at 412 West Cameron Avenue in Chapel Hill, now known as the Mason-Lloyd-Wiley House (built in 1860).

Lloyd died May 24, 1911, in Chapel Hill, and is buried in the Bethel Baptist Church cemetery located on 9326 Bethel Hickory Grove west of Chapel Hill.

There is a Thomas F. Lloyd Historic District (placed on the National Register August 14, 1986) in Carrboro that encompasses the mill village where residents of Lloyd's 1911 mill lived.

== See also ==
- Carr Mill Mall
- Weaver Street Market
- National Register of Historic Places listings in Orange County, North Carolina
