= Thomas and Mary Hogan House =

Historic house in North Carolina, United States

- U.S. National Register of Historic Places
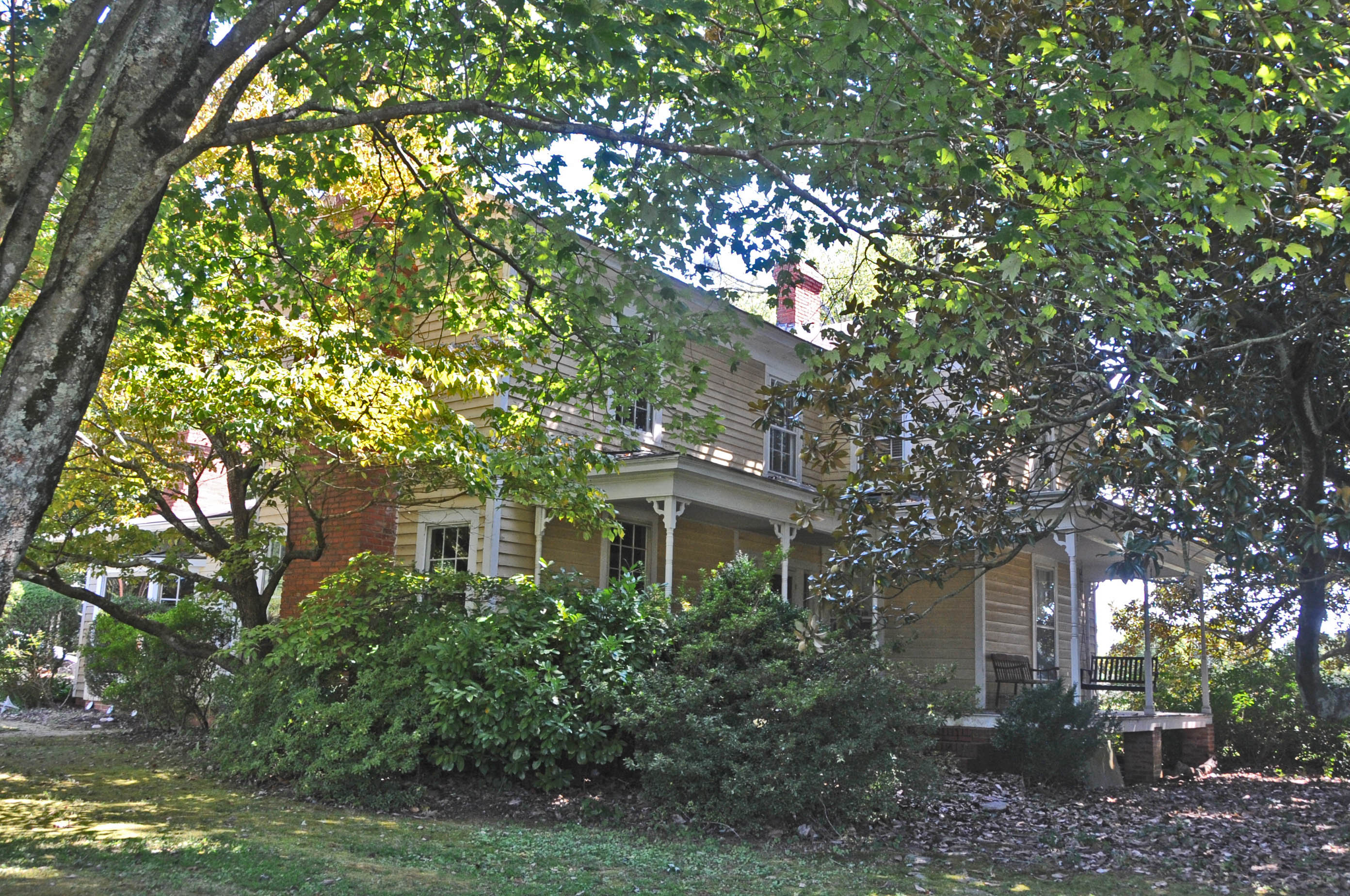
- Thomas and Mary Hogan House, March 2007

- Location within North Carolina Location within the United States
- Location: 9118 Hillsborough Rd., near Carrboro, North Carolina
- Coordinates: 35.93825°N 79.10424°W
- Area: 22 acres (8.9 ha)
- Built: c. 1860, c. 1890
- Built by: Hutchins, Moses
- Architectural style: Greek Revival, Queen Anne
- NRHP reference No.: 01000016
- Added to NRHP: January 26, 2001

Thomas and Mary Hogan House is a historic home located near Carrboro, Orange County, North Carolina. It was built about 1860, as a 1 1/2-story, Greek Revival style frame dwelling. It was enlarged to two-stories and updated with Queen Anne style design elements about 1890. The farmhouse is sheathed in plain weatherboard, has a gable-and-wing form, one gable end brick chimney, one interior brick chimney, and a one-story wraparound porch.

It was listed on the National Register of Historic Places in 2001.
