= Carrboro Citizen =

The Carrboro Citizen
- Type: newspaper
- Owner(s): Carrboro Citizen, LLC
- Publisher: Robert Dickson
- Editor: Susan Dickson
- Ceased publication: October 2012
- Language: English
- Headquarters: 309 Weaver Street, Suite 300, Carrboro, North Carolina United States
- Website: www.carrborocitizen.com

The Carrboro Citizen was a weekly newspaper based in Carrboro, North Carolina, US. The Citizen covered Carrboro, Chapel Hill, Hillsborough, Pittsboro, Orange County and northern Chatham County. It was published on Thursdays and distributed free in racks throughout the coverage area. The paper ceased publication in October 2012.

== History ==
The Citizen was launched in March 2007 by the publisher Robert Dickson, whose family also owns and operates the Raeford News-Journal in Hoke County, North Carolina, and Kirk Ross, who was the Citizen's editor until May 2011. The press run was originally 5,000 copies and grew to 7,000. The paper won several North Carolina Press Association awards for excellence in journalism, photography and design.

The Carrboro Citizen also published Mill, a monthly tabloid covering the arts, music and dining scene of the Carrboro/Chapel Hill area. Mill was inserted into the Citizen at the beginning of each month.

In May 2009, the Town of Carrboro approved a $50,000 loan at 2% interest to the paper. The loan was part of a revolving loan program that has been available to local businesses for several years. Alderwoman Jacqueline Gist said that the loan was a good idea because "The Citizen is an integral part of our community, and the only newspaper that provides local coverage." Robert Dickson put up his condominium appraised at $240,000 as collateral. Dickson discussed the loan in detail in a May 28, 2009, editorial.

In May 2011, Susan Dickson was named editor of the Citizen. She is a graduate of the UNC School of Journalism and has worked as a staff writer for the paper for several years. Dickson is the daughter of publisher Robert Dickson.

== Awards ==
- Isaac Sandlin, 2008 North Carolina Press Association News Photography award for "Eve Carson candlelight vigil"
- Taylor Sisk, 2008 North Carolina Press Association Profile Feature award for "A few moments with Beulah" and News Enterprise Reporting for "Rogers Road" and "Breakdown: A series on mental health"
- Liz Holm, 2009 North Carolina Press Association Best Ad Awards: first place in Best Full-Color Restaurant/Entertainment Ad, Best Full-Color Institutional Ad, and Best Special Section; second place in Best Full-Color Real Estate Ad, Best Full-Color Institutional Ad, and Best Shared Page; third place in Best Shared Page.
- General Excellence for Newspaper Websites, First Place, North Carolina Press Association 2009 Journalism Contest
- Liz Holm, 2010 North Carolina Press Association Best Ad Awards: first place in Best Full Color Retail Ad; second place in Best Shared Page; and third place in Best Full Color Restaurant/Entertainment Ad. (2010 winners have yet to be posted on the NCPA website.)
- General Excellence for Newspaper Websites, First Place, North Carolina Press Association 2010 Journalism Contest

== Online Archives ==
Archives, 2007-2012
