= Carrboro Commercial Historic District =

Historic district in North Carolina, United States

- U.S. National Register of Historic Places
- U.S. Historic district
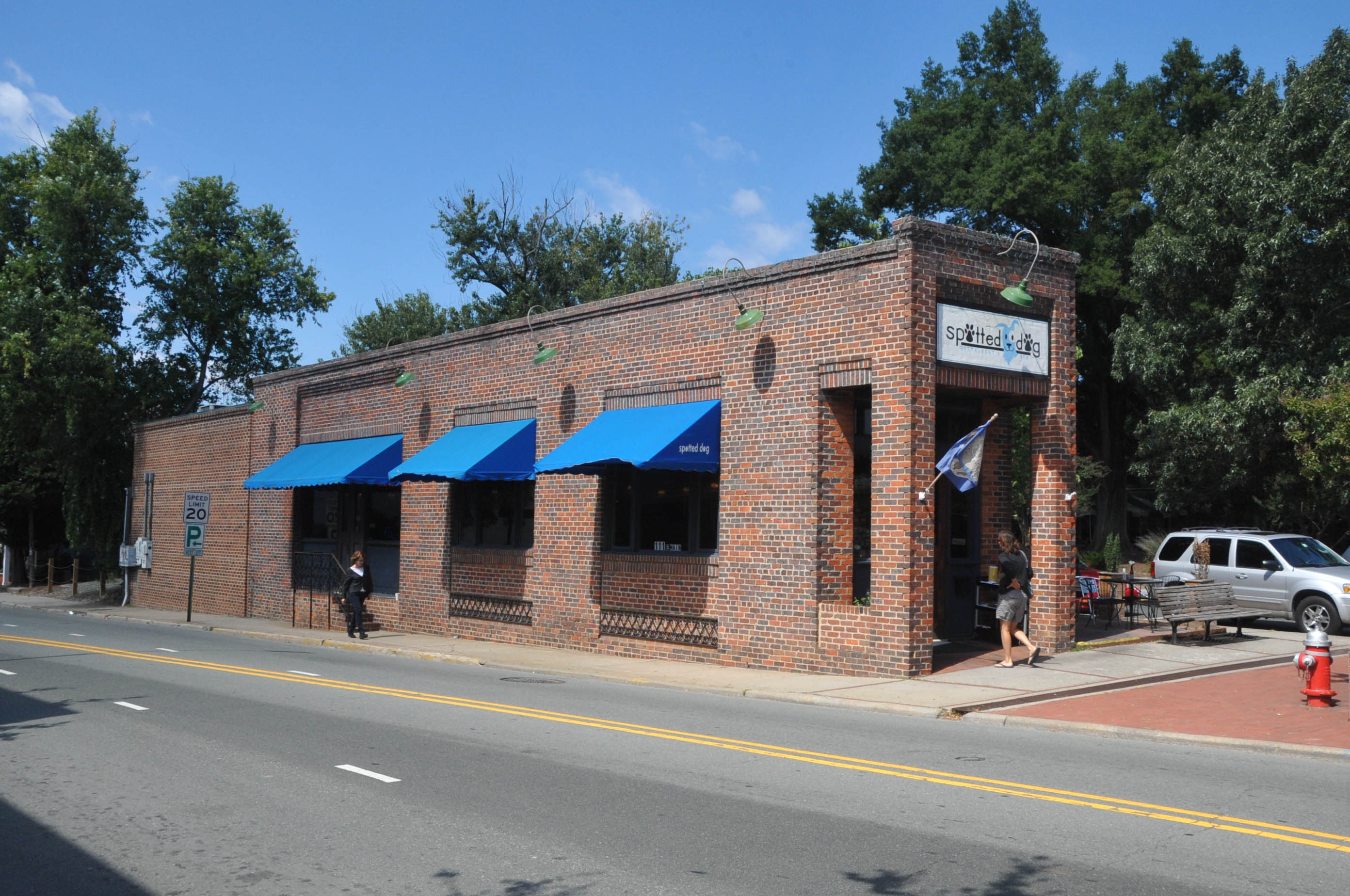
- "Flatiron Building," March 2007

- Location within North Carolina Location within the United States
- Location: 100 Blk. of E. Main St. between Greensboro Rd. & Roberson St., Carrboro, North Carolina
- Coordinates: 35°54′37″N 79°4′18″W
- Area: 2.8 acres (1.1 ha)
- Architect: Multiple
- NRHP reference No.: 85001339
- Added to NRHP: June 20, 1985

Carrboro Commercial Historic District is a national historic district located at Carrboro, Orange County, North Carolina. The district encompasses 12 contributing buildings in the central business district of Carrboro. The district's buildings date from about 1910 to the mid-1920s and are primarily one- and two-story brick commercial buildings. Notable buildings include the "Flatiron Building" (c. 1920), Hearn's Grocery (1924), a Bank and Jewelry Store (c. 1920–1924), the Miles Andrews House (c. 1910), Western Auto Store (c. 1924), and the building at 118-120 East Main Street (c. 1917–1920).

It was listed on the National Register of Historic Places in 1985.
