= Thomas F. Lloyd Historic District =

Historic district in North Carolina, United States

- U.S. National Register of Historic Places
- U.S. Historic district
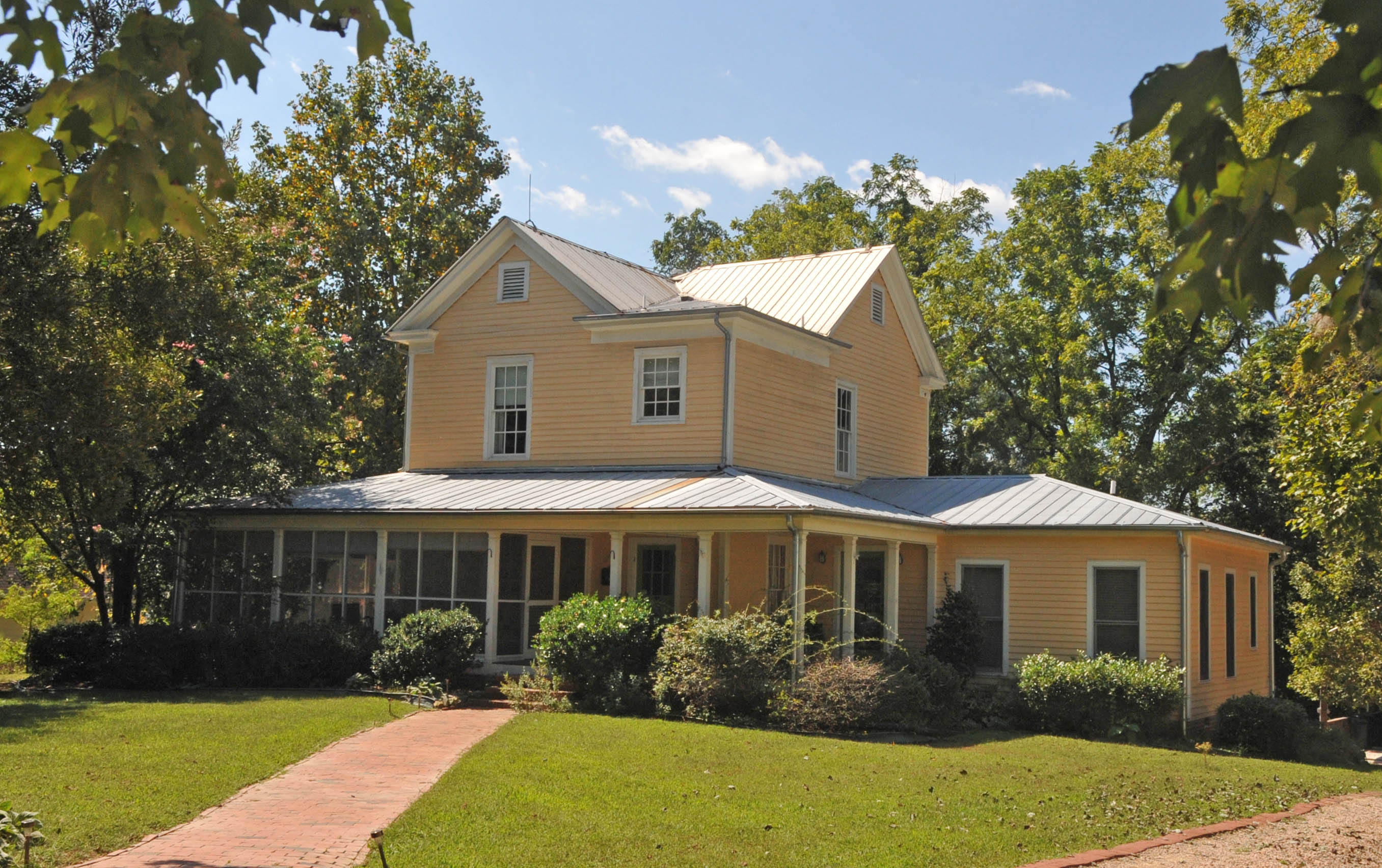
- Guest house for company visitors, March 2007

- Location within North Carolina Location within the United States
- Location: Roughly bounded by E. Carr St., Maple Ave., and S. Greensboro St., Carrboro, North Carolina
- Coordinates: 35°54′26″N 79°4′17″W
- Area: 10.2 acres (4.1 ha)
- Built: 1910-1915
- Architect: Lloyd, Thomas F.; Et al.
- Architectural style: Mill cottage type
- NRHP reference No.: 86001625
- Added to NRHP: August 14, 1986

Thomas F. Lloyd Historic District is a national historic district located at Carrboro, Orange County, North Carolina. The district encompasses 25 contributing buildings developed as housing for textile mill workers associated with the 1910 Thomas F. Lloyd Manufacturing Company. The district's buildings date between 1910 and 1915 and are primarily one- and two-story frame mill worker dwellings. A notable dwelling is located at 214 Maple Avenue, which was reportedly built by Thomas Lloyd as a "guest house" for the mill.

It was listed on the National Register of Historic Places in 1986.
