= William C. Friday =

American educator

Bill Friday
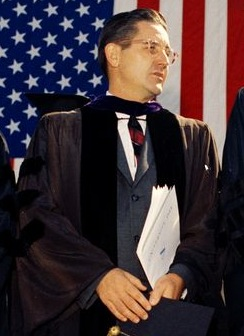
- Born: William Clyde Friday; July 13, 1920; Raphine, Virginia, U.S.
- Died: October 12, 2012 (aged 92); Chapel Hill, North Carolina, U.S.
- Education: North Carolina State University (BS); University of North Carolina, Chapel Hill (LLB)
- Occupations: Educator, TV Host
- Known for: 1st President of the University of North Carolina System
- Term: 1956–1986
- Predecessor: Harris Purks
- Successor: Clemmie Spangler
- Spouse: Ida Howell

William Clyde Friday (July 13, 1920 – October 12, 2012) was an American educator who served as the head of the University of North Carolina system from 1956 to 1986. He was born in Raphine, Virginia and raised in Dallas, North Carolina.

Friday graduated from Dallas High School in Dallas, North Carolina, where he played baseball and basketball. He held a bachelor's degree in textile manufacturing from North Carolina State University and a law degree from the University of North Carolina at Chapel Hill. While attending NCSU, Friday was elected president of the senior class of 1941. He was a member of Lambda Chi Alpha fraternity. Friday served in the United States Navy Reserve during World War II.

His entire professional life was spent in higher education. Friday was assistant dean of students at the University of North Carolina at Chapel Hill from 1948 to 1951, assistant to the President of the Consolidated University of North Carolina Gordon Gray from 1951 to 1955, then Secretary of the University of North Carolina system, and acting president of the system from 1956 to 1957, when he was named as permanent president. Friday would remain in this position until retiring in 1986.

Friday was the founding co-chairman of the Knight Foundation Commission on Intercollegiate Athletics and served in this role from 1989 to 2005.

After retirement, Friday remained an influential voice in North Carolina and hosted North Carolina People a talk show on the UNC-TV public television network, which he began while still president of the UNC system. In 2012, the show began its 42nd season. When Friday endorsed Erskine Bowles as the new president of the University in 2006, it was seen as helping "seal the deal" for Bowles to get the post.

Several educational institutions, or units of larger institutions, are named in Friday's honor. William C. Friday Middle School is located in Dallas, in Gaston County, Friday's home county. The William and Ida Friday Institute for Educational Innovation is located on the campus of North Carolina State University at Raleigh. The William and Ida Friday Center for Continuing Education is located on the campus of the University of North Carolina at Chapel Hill. He died in his sleep on October 12, 2012, UNC's University Day, aged 92.

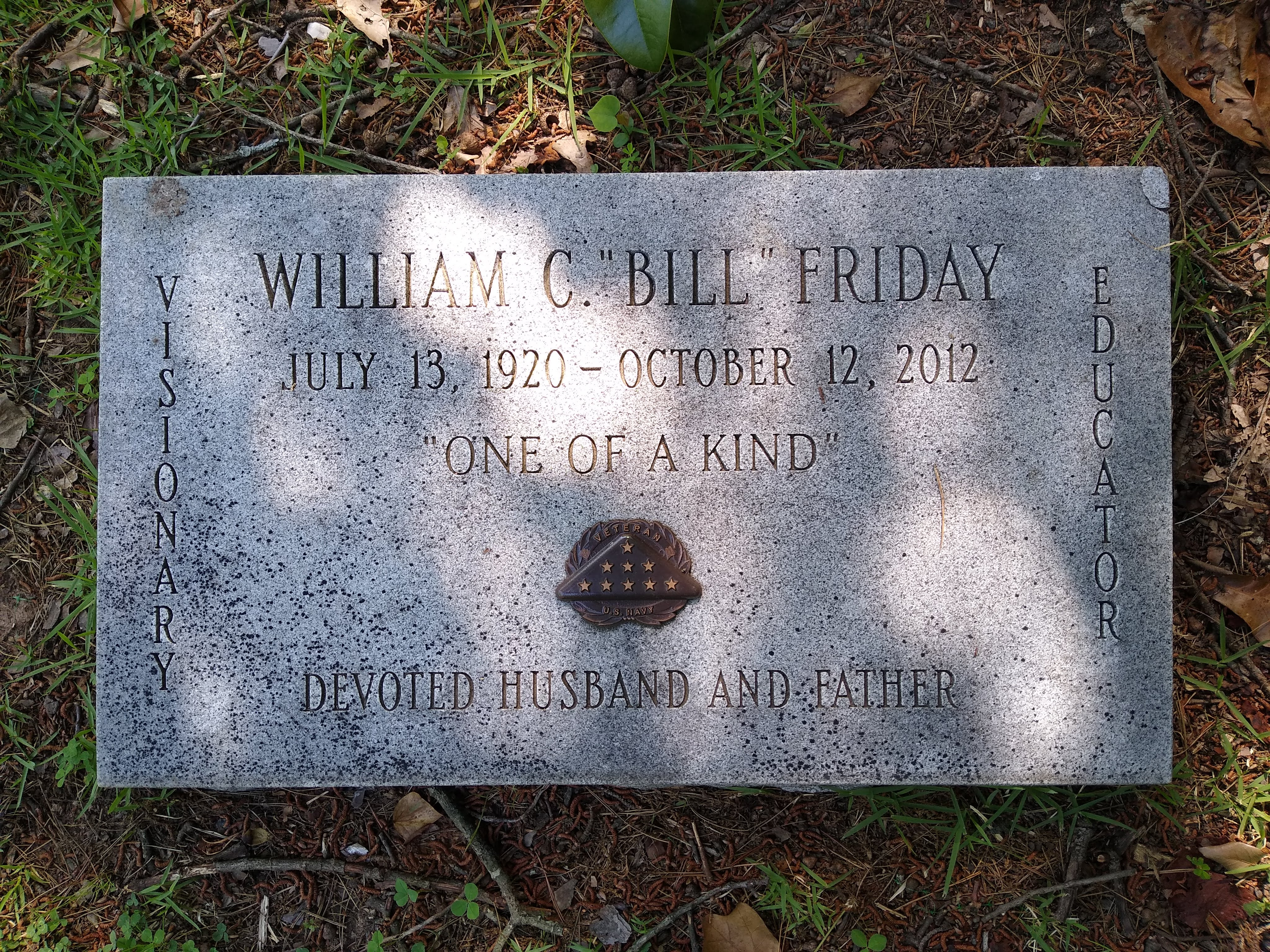
William C. Friday's grave at the Old Chapel Hill Cemetery

He is buried at the Old Chapel Hill Cemetery in Chapel Hill.
