= Herbert Lee Waters =

American film director

Herbert Lee Waters (1902–1997) was an American photographer and filmmaker. Waters was born in Caroleen, North Carolina. He worked as a studio photographer in Lexington, North Carolina. Waters also created over 252 short films that make up a series, Movies of Local People, depicting life in small towns in North Carolina, South Carolina, Tennessee, and Virginia. Waters arranged screenings of the short films at local cinemas. They were usually played before the feature film of the screening. Waters made the films profitable for himself through admission prices and contributions from local businesses that wished to appear in the films.

The films, produced between 1936 and 1942, provide insight into American life during the Great Depression. The subject matter of the films includes footage of school children, people at work, athletic events, scenes from city streets, and other everyday activities. Notably, in making his movies Waters often set up his camera in Black communities as well, and his Chapel Hill, NC films feature Black residents only.

Waters produced Movies of Local People primarily on 16mm black and white reversal film, using color film, typically Kodachrome, on occasion. He shot most of his films at 16 frames per second, and did most of his editing in camera. A collection of Waters' films is housed at the Rubenstein Rare Book & Manuscript Library at Duke University. A number of the films have been digitized and are available in Duke Digital Collections. Further information can be found in the Duke Libraries Guide to H. Lee Waters.

In 2004, the Library of Congress selected Waters' film called Kannapolis, N.C. for preservation in the National Film Registry as representative of his work and genre.
