= Carr Mill Mall =

- Alberta Mill Complex
- U.S. National Register of Historic Places
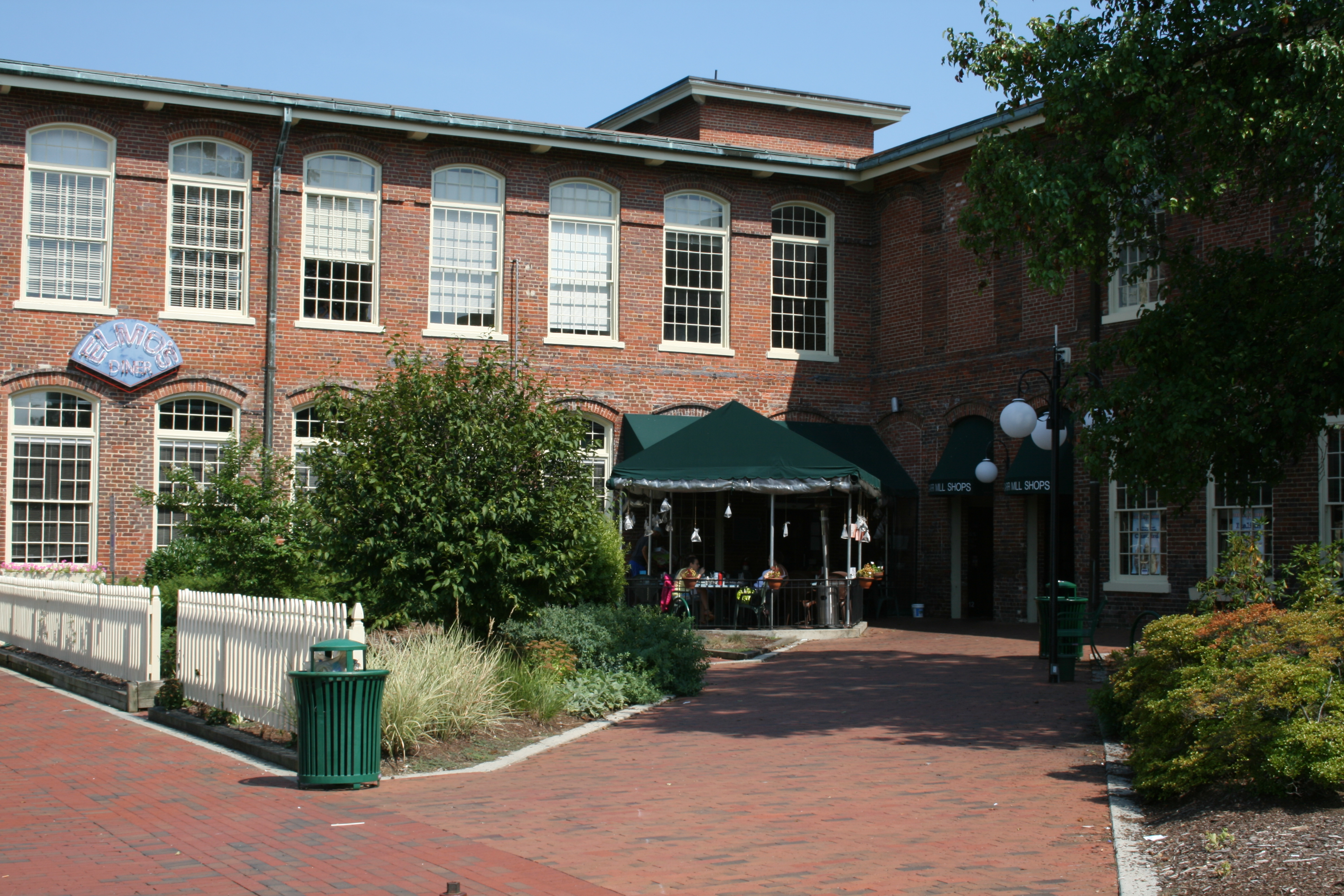
- Carr Mill Mall exterior

- Location within North Carolina Location within the United States
- Location: 200 North Greensboro Street, Carrboro, North Carolina
- Coordinates: 35°54′41″N 79°4′17″W
- Area: 10 acres (4.0 ha)
- Built: 1882
- NRHP reference No.: 76001332
- Added to NRHP: January 19, 1976

Carr Mill Mall is a small, local shopping mall located in Carrboro, North Carolina. It is listed on the National Register of Historic Places as the Alberta Mill Complex. It is also a host for numerous local live performances and other cultural events.

== History ==
Built in 1898 by Thomas F. Lloyd, it was formerly a cotton mill known as the Alberta Cotton Mill. By 1913, it had become one of the world's largest hardwood cross-tie makers, shipping them on train tracks adjacent to the mall that continue past Carrboro to the University of North Carolina at Chapel Hill. In 1909, the Julian Carr family bought the mill. In 1913, Carrboro, previously known as West End, was renamed "Venable" in honor of Francis P. Venable, the president of the University of North Carolina at that time. The mill closed by 1930. In 1945, the mill re-opened and remained open until the 1960s.

In 1974, the Carrboro Board of Aldermen voted to have the building torn down to build a shopping mall on the site. In light of community opposition to the plan, the idea was scrapped, and the mill complex was renovated and reopened as Carr Mill Mall. The complex now houses numerous restaurants and stores as well as commercial office space on its upper levels.

The song "Freight Train" by Elizabeth 'Libba" Cotten was inspired by the train that ran on the State University Railroad spur past her house on Lloyd St, and which served the needs of Carr Mill. Cotten wrote the song in the early 1900s, as a young teenager.
