= Hollywood Theatre (Toronto) =

Movie theatre in Ontario, Canada

Coordinates: 43.68953°N 79.39447°W

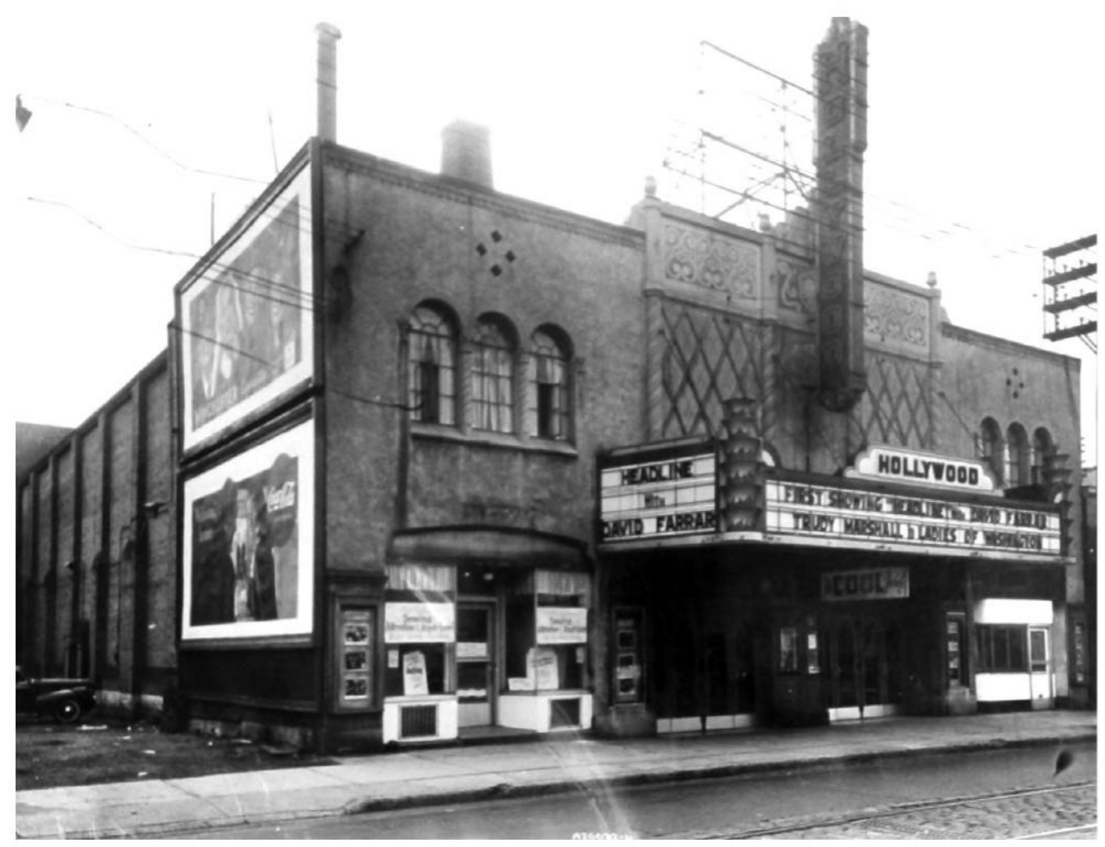
The Hollywood Theatre in 1945

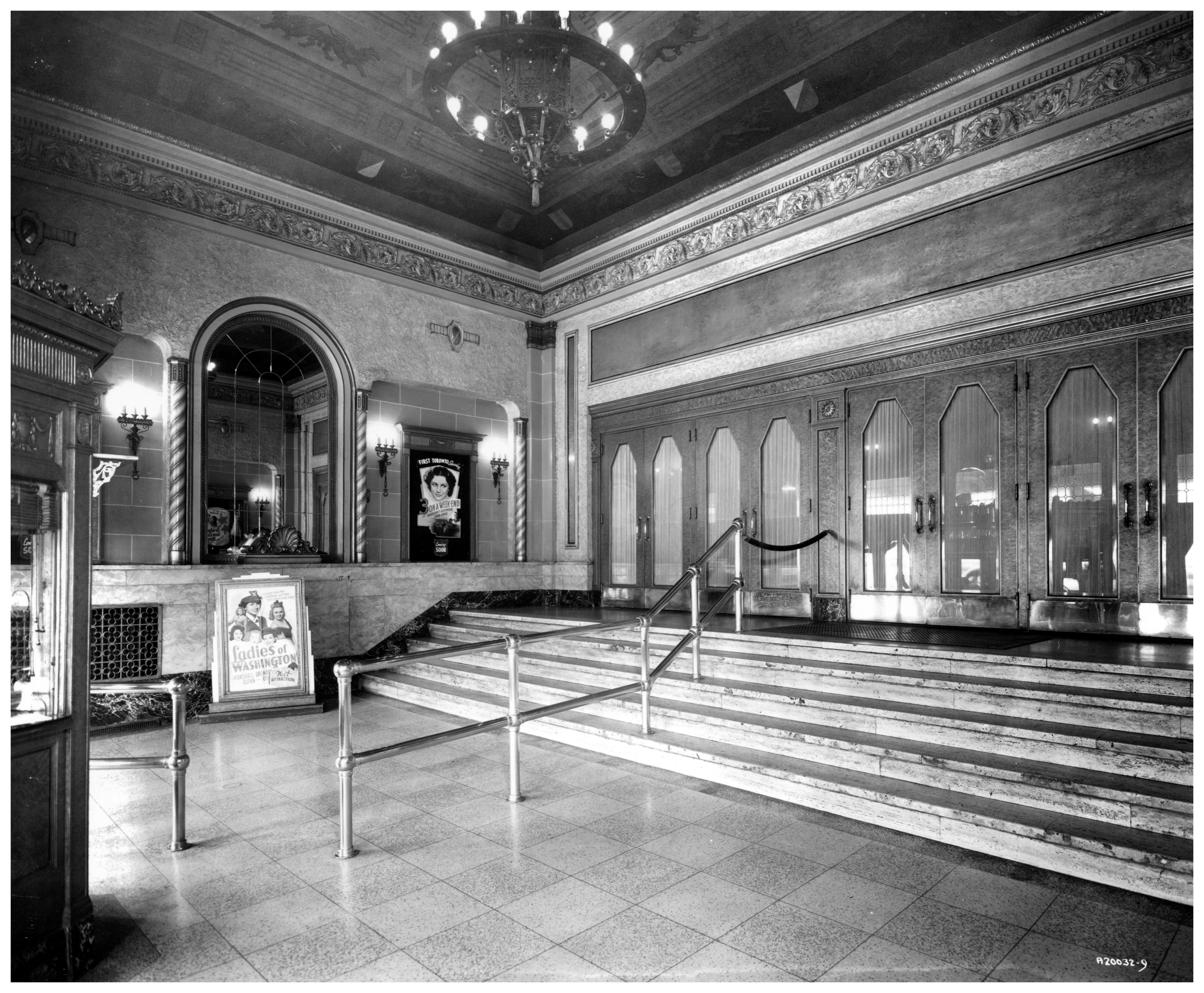
Inside the Hollywood Theatre, 1943

The Hollywood Theatre was a movie theatre at 1519 Yonge Street in Toronto, Ontario. It opened in 1930 and was located on the east side of Yonge Street, north of St. Clair Avenue.

== History ==
The Hollywood Theatre was the first cinema in Toronto specifically built to show talking pictures – movies with sound. It was designed by architect Herbert George Duerr, who designed it with a Moorish-style façade. As built, it contained 1,321 seats.

The building was renovated multiple times, adding a second auditorium, seating 800 patrons, in 1946. According to author Doug Taylor, it became the first cinema in Canada to have more than one auditorium.

The venue was operated by the Famous Players chain. In 1948, the Odeon Theatres chain built the Odeon Hyland cinema at 1501 Yonge Street, just south of the Hollywood Theatre.

In 1964, the film Mary Poppins played at the theatre for 44 weeks. 500,000 tickets were sold.

Famous Players closed the theatre in February 1999, and it was demolished later in 1999.
