= Desegregation of theaters in Durham, North Carolina =

Desegregation of theaters in Durham, North Carolina, United States, followed a series of protests between 1961 and 1963, as well as petitions to local government officials and eventually legal action. The protests eventually came to focus on the Carolina Theater. In March 1962, the theater's manager rejected a proposal from the local NAACP chapter to negotiate its desegregation and later refused the city council's request that it reconsider the decision. In response, the protesters began "round-robin" demonstrations. After a court order ended those demonstrations, activists took their case to the courts. Eventually, in July 1963, after mass demonstrations and support from new mayor Wense Grabarek, Durham's segregated movie theaters began to open to the public.

== Movie going and discrimination ==
=== Discrimination ===
At the beginning of the 1960s, some theaters in North Carolina only allowed white Americans, while others segregated white and black Americans by assigning them into different sections in the theater. In certain theaters, owners and managers differentiated tickets with stamps or hired ushers in order to guarantee that black Americans be seated only in top balconies, called “Buzzard’s Roosts”. In other cases, black Americans were forced to enter from a separate entrance or be restricted to late showings called 'midnight rambles'.

To take advantage of a new prosperous section of the Black population, entrepreneur Frederick King Watkins opened a number of black-only theaters. These seldom screened the latest Hollywood films, and often alternated films with all-black casts with western films.

=== Segregation on Public Lands ===
A court ruling in Greensboro, North Carolina, concerning a privately owned golf course operating on leased public property upheld that African Americans had a right to be on public lands despite ownership. The verdict was that segregation could not be maintained indirectly: the golf course remained public property despite the business being privately owned.

The Carolina Theater, established in 1926, was in 1961 privately owned by Charles Abercrombie, but the building, the Durham Auditorium, was leased for $10,000 a year. The similarities between the two situations provided a legal base upon which protestation against the desegregation of the municipally owned Carolina theaters rested.

=== Petitions and Mass Movements ===
On November 2, 1960 the Carolina Theater case was brought before the City Council. The NAACP petitioned for the integration of the Carolina Theater, among many other racial reforms. The City Council relegated the petition to the Mayor’s Human Resource Committee.

In January 1961, the NAACP issued a letter voicing its complaint about the segregation in theaters to the committee on Human Relations, City manager George Aull, and manager of the Carolina Theater Milo Crawford. In the letter, protestors stated their discontent with the “illegal” and “morally unjustified” policies of the theater. The NAACP acquired the signatures of students from nine different high schools and colleges: Duke University, North Carolina College, Durham High School, Henderson of Hills High School, Merrick-Moore High School, Whitted Junior High School, Deshazor’s Beauty College, Bull City Barber College, and Durham Business College.

On January 21, in front of the Center and Carolina Theaters, faculty and students from the all-black North Carolina College and Duke University joined together to stage a protest. They locked arms to block the entrance to the theater, forcing their way into the entrance, and staging sit-ins.

The new manager of the Carolina Theater, Charles Abercrombie, was persistent in his refusal to discuss the segregation issue, stating that “the question of whether or not to desegregate had been accepted by the Commission as a foregone conclusion”.

In March 1962, the Carolina Theater was integrated for the first time when fourteen African Americans students snuck past the ticket ushers. For two days, long lines were formed by over a thousand African Americans in front of the ticket box, in which each black participant who was refused a ticket to the white section returned to the end of the line to try again, a tactic called "round-robin". As students were denied their entrance to the theater, they attempted elicit a reason from the salesman in order to gather evidence that African Americans were being denied entrance due to race. When the box office moved to the inside of the Theater, white advocates aided in the effort by purchasing tickets for black moviegoers, who would then sneak into the side doors of the theater.

=== Response to Protests ===
In response to the two-day mass demonstration, Judge Hamilton Hobgood issued a restraining order for the 34 students of the NAACP Youth Group who were in charge of the demonstration to stay away from the theater. Claiming to have suffered tremendous financial and reputational losses from the student-run protest, Abercrombie demanded a total of $30,000 in compensation: $25,000 for punitive damages and $5,000 for disruption of the natural procession of the theater. The restraining order also restricted interfering with the normal business functions of the theater, blocking the incoming and outgoing of consumers, and re-entering the line after being refused a ticket. A copy of the restraining order was posted outside the theater and handed out to each of the 34 students.

=== Desegregation and aftermath ===
In 1963, the Mayor’s Interim Committee of Race Relations proposed a solution that both the theater managers and the chapters of NAACP and CORE supported. On July 15 the NAACP and CORE chapters initiated a twenty-day trial period in which most of Durham’s theaters, including the Carolina Theater, integrated blacks into the theaters in a controlled and spaced manner. Mrs. Bessie McLaurin, one of the adult supervisors in CORE, served as the scheduling manager for numerous theaters during the twenty-day trial. Black movie-goers interested in a particular showing had to contact McLaurin in order to schedule a time and date for their attendance. The idea was to gradually increase the number of African Americans allowed into each showing by each of the twenty trial days in order to slowly integrate them into the audience. On August 5, 1963, new mayor Wense Grabarek informed Miss Joyce Ware, the NAACP-CORE council chairman, that all movie houses except the Uptown Theater would be open to the entire public. This marked the end of the 20-day trial period and the integration of the Carolina Theater.
