= Weaver Street Market =

Market in North Carolina, US

Coordinates: 35.9111°N 79.0713°W

Weaver Street Market logo

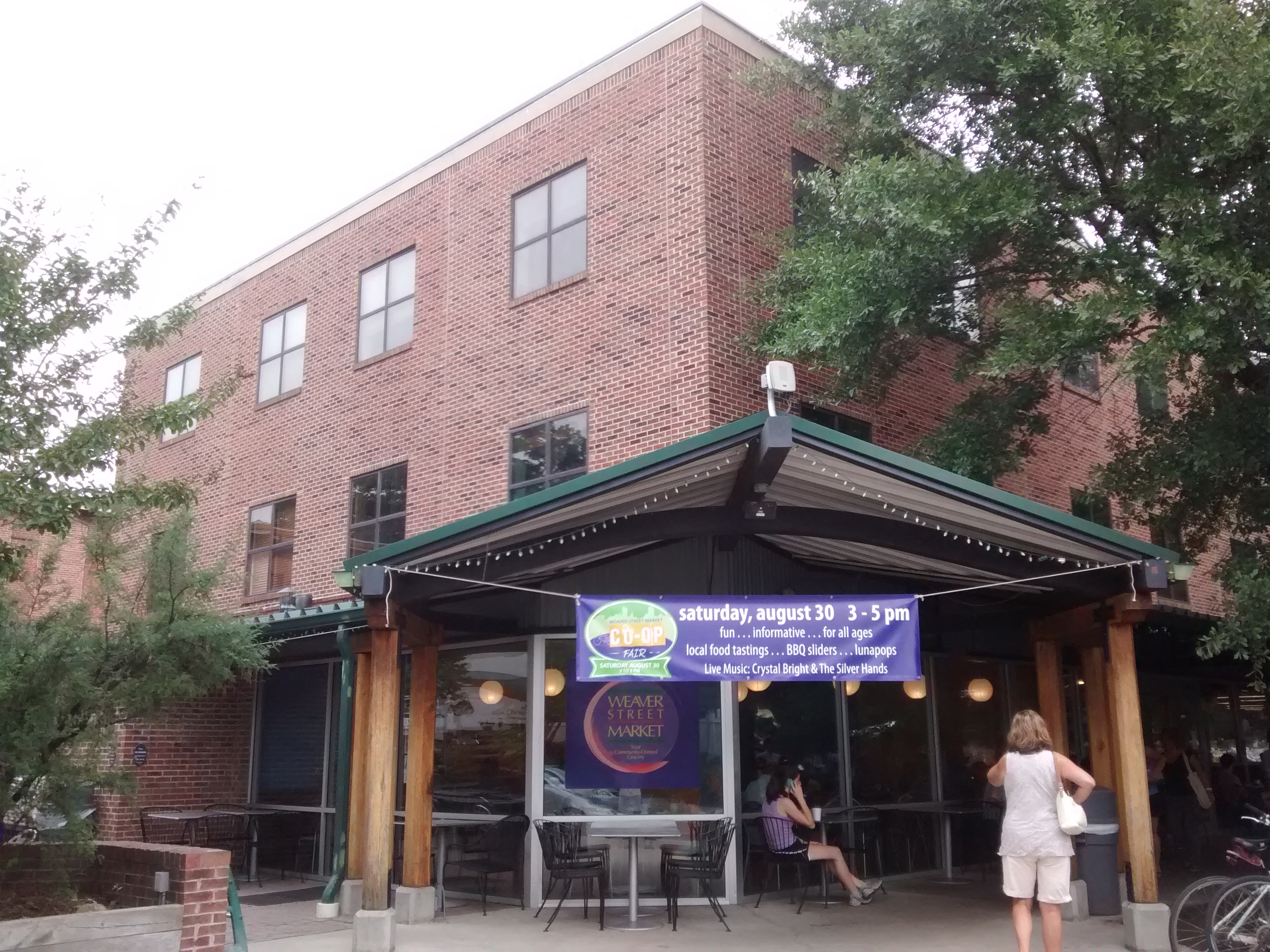
Weaver Street Market

Weaver Street Market is a worker- and consumer-owned cooperative selling natural and organic food with a focus on local and fair trade products. The original market is situated in the heart of Carrboro, North Carolina, in Carr Mill Mall and hosts many community events. It occupies a central location in the town of Carrboro and serves as a "community gathering place."

Besides the original Carrboro location, Weaver Street Market has expanded into three additional locations in Southern Village in Chapel Hill, historic downtown Hillsborough, North Carolina, and at The Dillon in Raleigh, North Carolina. Weaver Street Market previously operated a restaurant, Panzanella, featuring local food. In late December 2013, Panzanella officially ceased business operations.

== History ==
The market was established with a loan from the town of Carrboro.

In 2006, some local residents expressed concerns regarding new rules governing use of the market lawn. The rules stated that all performances on the market lawn must have signed permission in advance from the owners of Carr Mill Mall.

The next year, plans were announced to open a third store in Hillsborough, North Carolina, and move the market's food preparation operations to Hillsborough for greater efficiency. Even though the plans were announced in May 2007, plans and employee feedback were included in the decision-making process since 2006. About 100 workers presented a petition in opposition to the plan outlining their concerns that WSM was growing too large.

Plans have been made in other locales to copy the success of Weaver Street Market; one example is in Boynton Beach, Florida.
