= Southern Village, North Carolina =

Coordinates: 35.8817°N 79.0662°W

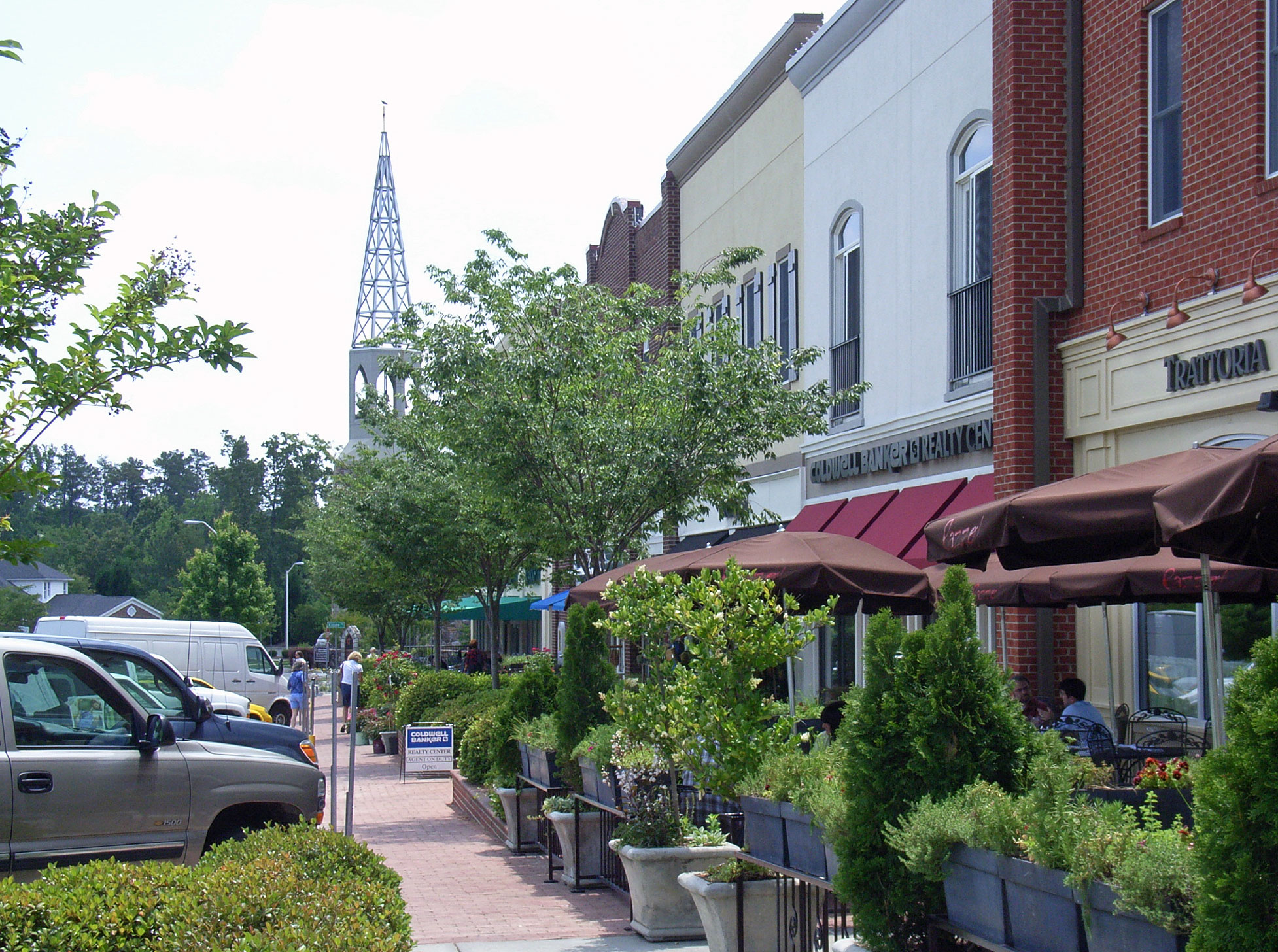
Market Street, Southern Village

Southern Village is a 312-acre (1.3 km^{2}) New Urbanism neighborhood located in Chapel Hill, North Carolina. Established in 1994, it includes 550 single-family homes, 375 townhomes and condominiums, 250 apartments, and 350,000 square feet (33,000 m^{2}) of retail, office, and civic space. Southern Village was the top selling neighborhood in the Triangle market from 1999 to 2001. Nationally recognized as an example of smart growth, Southern Village has been featured in numerous publications including TIME, Better Homes & Gardens, and Builder magazines.

Andrés Duany, the founder of New Urbanism, came to Chapel Hill and spoke to the Town Council about the future of New Urbanism in the town, which had a profound effect on a property developer named D.R. Bryan. Bryan then traveled to Pienza, Italy, to understand the concepts of New Urbanism by visiting their source. He returned with his own vision, and with the help of real estate broker Jim Earnhardt, Bryan became the architect and developer of Southern Village.

== Business District ==
The village's commercial options include a variety of restaurants and shops, medical clinics and a dentist, a gym, and other local businesses, as well as a Weaver Street Market co-op grocery store and the Lumina Theater movie cinema. In addition, Bryan Properties partnered with Beacon ING of Charlotte in early 2017 to develop a Hyatt Place just outside the main entrance of the community. “We are looking at it as the third anchor for the Village Center,” said developer D.R. Bryan.

== Education ==
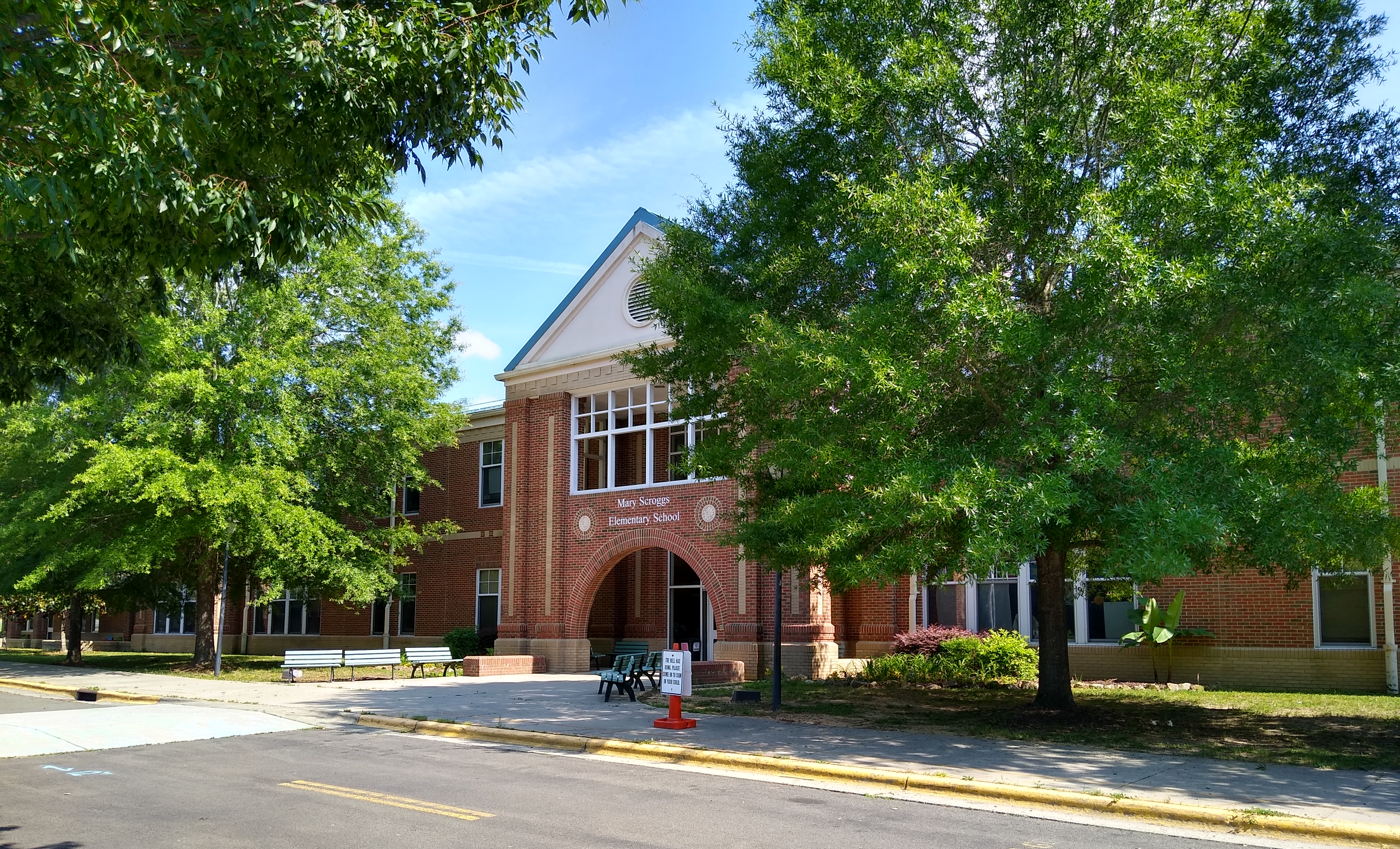
Mary Scroggs Elementary School

The neighborhood is home to Mary Scroggs Elementary School, with an adjacent private pre-school, and in walking distance to Culbreth Middle School which are a part of the Chapel Hill-Carrboro City Schools. Additionally, Carrboro High School, one of the top high schools in the state, is less than two miles away.

== Recreation ==
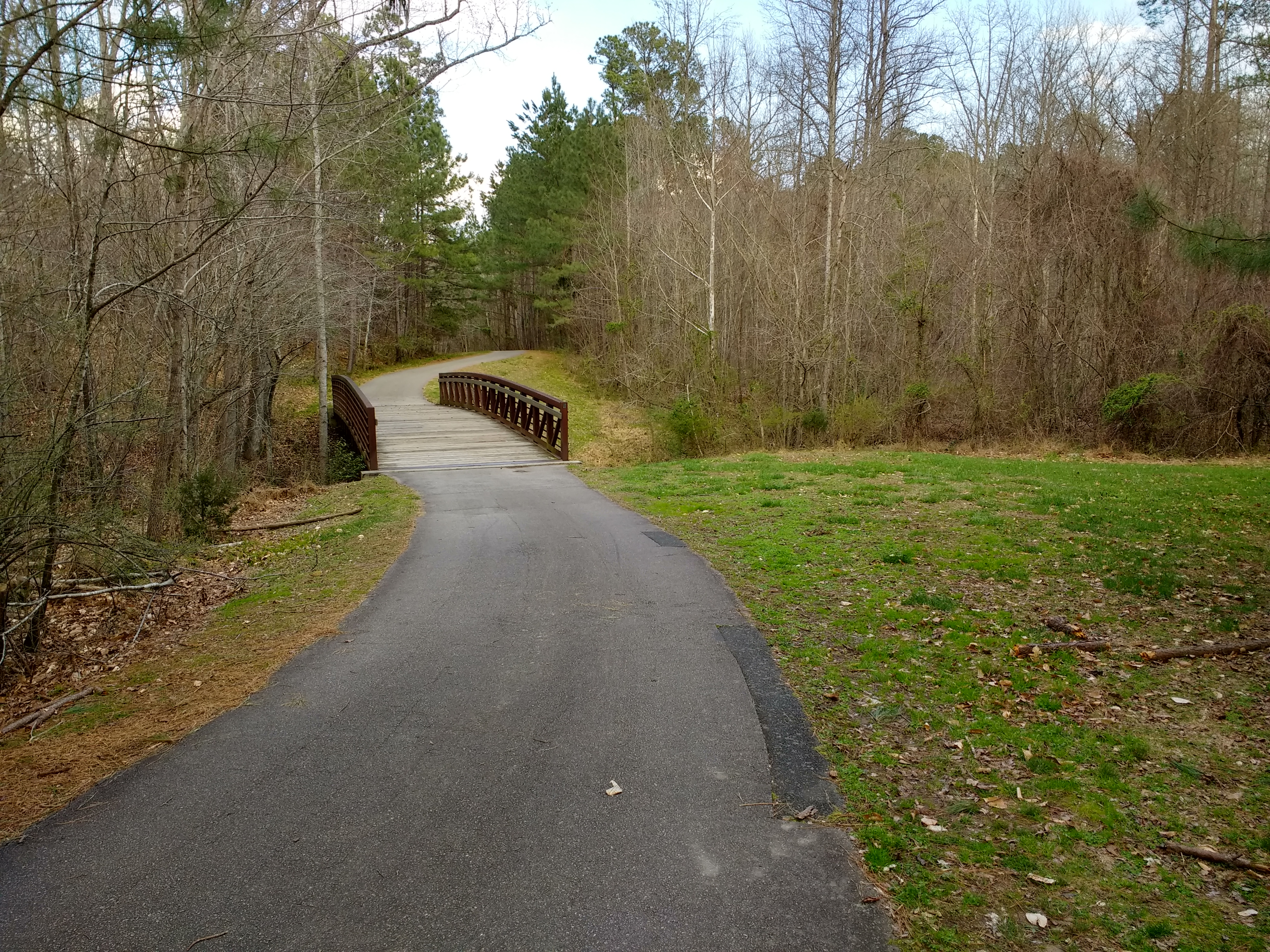
The Fan Branch Trail

The Lumina Theatre in Southern Village shows films year-round, but during the warmer months, moviegoers can bring their own chairs and blankets and catch family-friendly flicks outdoors on the Village Green. There are also free concerts on the Green on Sundays at 6pm.

The community is served by the southern, and only completed end, of the Fan Branch Trail. commonly called the greenway by local residents, this trail forms part of a bike trail system planned for the Chapel Hill area. This section of the trail leads form Meadows Pasture all the way to Mary Scroggs elementary, and The Southern Community Park, which abuts the Village offers soccer fields and a dog-walking park, a playground and cookout area, and a roller hockey rink, as well as an extension of the Fan Branch Trail.

== Culture ==
The North Carolina Symphony visits once a year to give a free outdoor concert on the Village Green. Pop pieces from films such as Mission Impossible, Star Wars and Superman are often featured, along with such favorites as Turkey in the Straw and the William Tell Overture. There are often festivals in the central area and during the summer (weather permitting) there are outdoor movies.

== Transportation ==
The village is served by Chapel Hill Transit, connecting the community Park and Ride lot with downtown Chapel Hill, and with the nearby University of North Carolina at Chapel Hill. Service is provided during full-service periods, Monday through Friday only, with a special "Safe Ride" late night service Thursday, Friday and Saturday nights.
