= Carrboro, North Carolina =

- Town
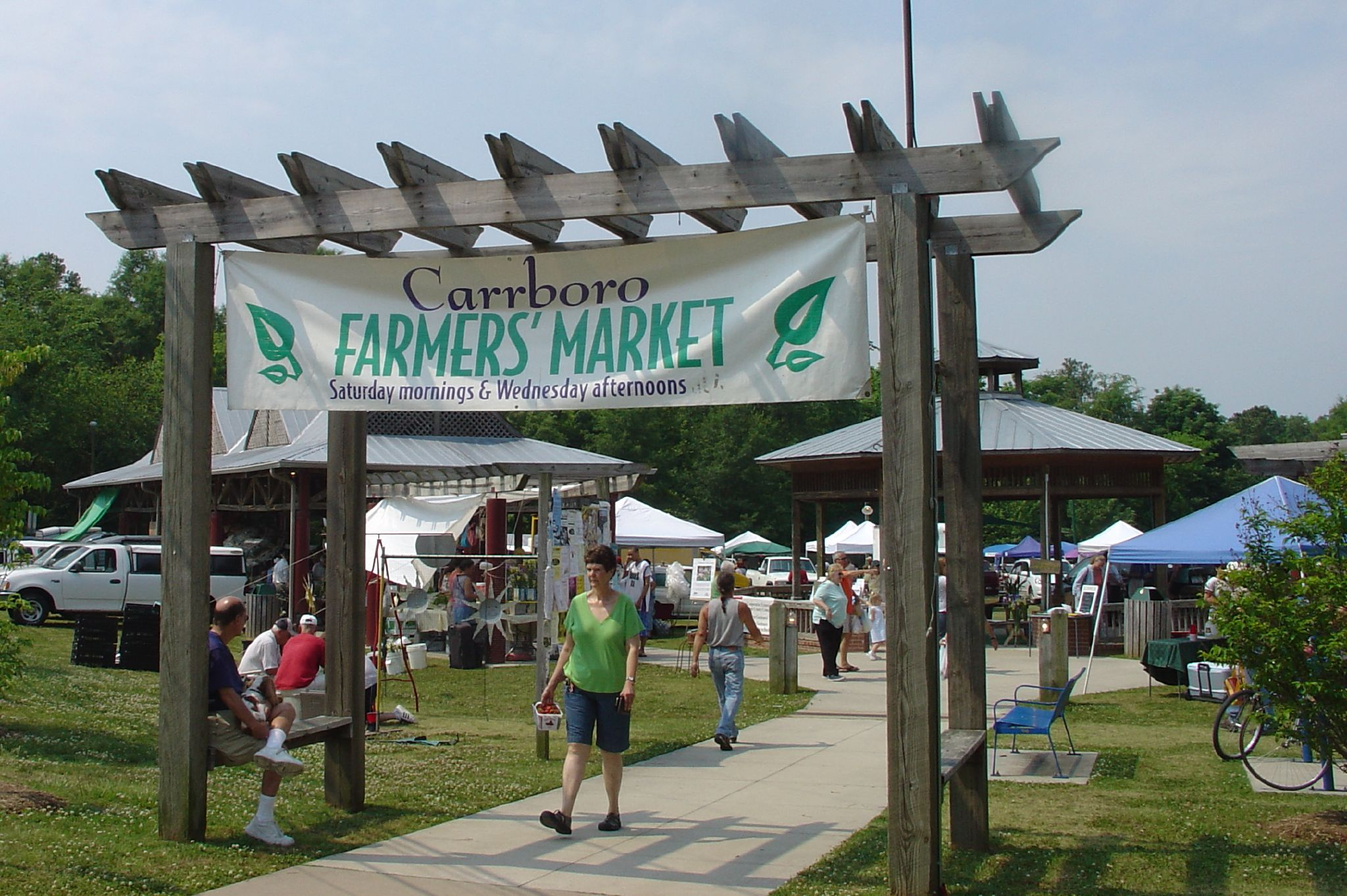
- The Carrboro Farmers' Market (2007)

- Flag Seal
- Nicknames: The Paris of the Piedmont, Shadow City
- Motto: "Feel Free"
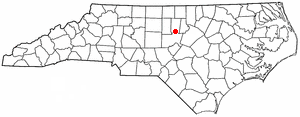
- Location of Carrboro, North Carolina
- Coordinates: 35°54′36″N 79°04′31″W
- Country: United States
- State: North Carolina
- County: Orange
- Settled: 1882
- Incorporated: 1911
- Named after: Julian Shakespeare Carr

Government
  - Type: Council–manager
  - Mayor: Barbara Foushee

Area
  - Total: 6.51 sq mi (16.85 km^{2})
  - Land: 6.47 sq mi (16.77 km^{2})
  - Water: 0.031 sq mi (0.08 km^{2})
- Elevation: 489 ft (149 m)

Population (2020)
  - Total: 21,295
  - Density: 3,288.6/sq mi (1,269.73/km^{2})
- Time zone: UTC−5 (EST)
  - Summer (DST): UTC−4 (EDT)
- ZIP code: 27510
- Area code: 919
- FIPS code: 37-10620
- GNIS feature ID: 2405383
- Website: townofcarrboro.org

Carrboro is a town in Orange County in the U.S. state of North Carolina. The population was 21,295 at the 2020 census. The town, which is part of the Raleigh-Durham-Chapel Hill combined statistical area, was named after North Carolina industrialist Julian S. Carr.

Located directly west of Chapel Hill, home of the University of North Carolina's flagship campus, Carrboro has a reputation as one of the most progressive communities in the Southeastern United States. It was the first municipality in North Carolina to elect an openly gay mayor (Michael R. Nelson in 1995) and the first municipality in the state to grant domestic-partner benefits to same-sex couples. In October 2002, Carrboro was among the first municipalities in the South to adopt resolutions opposing the Iraq War and the USA PATRIOT Act.

== History ==
Before European settlement, the Occaneechi Indians lived in the area of what is now Hillsborough, north of Carrboro. As part of North Carolina's piedmont region, European settlement in the area likely did not begin until at least the 1730s.

The history of Carrboro is similar to the history of many mill towns in North Carolina and largely parallels the histories of the State University Railroad and the Alberta Cotton Mill. Located just west of Chapel Hill, Carrboro was originally known as West End. It was settled in 1882 near the terminus "in a vacant field" of the 10.2 miles (16.4 km) State University Railroad spur from University Station in Glenn, North Carolina. (State law required that the railway be at least 1 mile (1.6 km) from the university campus "to guard against possible damage to student morals and habits of study," or as it was more cynically put, "to discourage students from leaving on the weekends and spending their money elsewhere.) Settlement in West End increased after 1898 when Thomas F. Lloyd of Chapel Hill built a steam-powered grist mill near the depot. This would become the Alberta Cotton Mill, and in 1900 the town briefly called itself Lloydville in his honor.

Durham businessman Julian S. Carr bought the mill and other nearby buildings in 1909, adding them to the chain of mills that became Durham Hosiery Mills. In 1911, West End was incorporated and named Venable in honor of chemistry professor and University of North Carolina president Francis Preston Venable, but only two years later was renamed Carrboro, after Carr provided electric power for the community and expanded the mill. In addition to the university and the textile mills, the railroad depot in Carrboro also served the local lumber industry, and in the 1920s and 1930s Carrboro became a major hub in the hardwood cross-tie market.

A 1920s building boom in Carrboro, sparked by a fire in the downtown business district, ended as business at the Durham Hosiery Mills declined towards the end of the decade. The Great Depression also took an economic toll and in 1930 the company closed Mill No. 4, the original Alberta Cotton Mill. Passenger service on the train line ended in 1936. In 1938 Durham Hosiery Mills closed Mill No. 7, across Main Street from Mill No. 4, and ceased operations altogether.

In 1937, the border between Carrboro and Chapel Hill was the site of a 1937 Chapel Hill Race Riot resulting from the mill closures, general economic hardship, racial tensions, and neglect of Chapel Hill's Black community. Geeta N. Kapur and John K. Chapman described the incident as a revolt by Black workers.

As a result of the riot, Carrboro and Chapel Hill leadership met to "sum up events and explore methods of suppressing future disorders." Chapel Hill Town Manager Caldwell made plans to purchase "a submachine gun with ammunition, twelve hand grenades, and 'three gas billies with twelve cartridges'". It was decided that Chapel Hill, Carrboro, and UNC would split the costs of the purchase, and ended up spending $164.50 each on the acquisition.

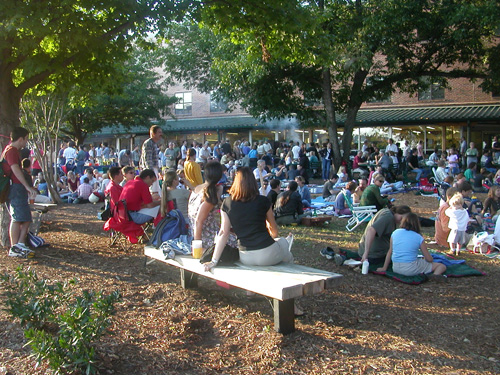
Weaver Street market

"Robert 'Bob' Drakeford, the town's first Black mayor, elected in 1977, recalled when Carrboro was a sundown town, where people of color knew not to be out after dark."

During World War II, Mill No. 7 became the site of a munitions factory. After the war, Pacific Mills bought both Mills No. 4 and 7 and operated them as Carrboro Woolen Mills. When Pacific Mills closed in the mid-1960s - the final activity at the mill was sorting and shipping BVD underwear - Carrboro was no longer able to depend upon the textile industry to sustain itself. The University of North Carolina and other businesses in the area were growing rapidly and provided work in a wide range of occupations and locations.

The mill remained abandoned for nearly a decade and changed hands several times. In 1975 the owner, with the assent of the Carrboro Board of Aldermen, intended to have it demolished. A community petition and fund-raising effort provided for its restoration as Carr Mill Mall. It has since grown into a bustling hub of activity, hosting many businesses such as Weaver Street Market.

In addition to the Alberta Mill Complex, the Carrboro Commercial Historic District, Thomas and Mary Hogan House, and Thomas F. Lloyd Historic District are listed on the National Register of Historic Places. Carrboro's origin story is closely tied to its historic railroad station, which was built in 1913. Initially known as "West Of" due to its proximity to Chapel Hill, the area around the station developed into a thriving settlement, eventually becoming the town of Carrboro.

=== Name ===
Carrboro was named for Julian S. Carr, a UNC alumnus, trustee, honorary degree recipient, industrialist, and philanthropist whose company brought electric power to the town. Carr was also a white supremacist who opposed Black suffrage, defended the Ku Klux Klan and lynchings, and endorsed the "Lost Cause" interpretation of the Civil War, during which he served as a private in the Confederate States Army. A 2011 letter to the University of North Carolina at Chapel Hill student newspaper, The Daily Tar Heel, called attention to Carr's remarks at the 1913 dedication of the Silent Sam monument on the University of North Carolina campus. The following passage, quoted in the letter, has become locally famous:

One hundred yards from where we stand, less than ninety days perhaps after my return from Appomattox, I horse whipped a negro wench until her skirts hung in shreds because she had maligned and insulted a Southern lady, and then rushed for protection to these University buildings where was stationed a garrison of 100 Federal soldiers. I performed the pleasing duty in the immediate presence of the entire garrison.

As a result of this publication, a petition to change the town's name arose, and former mayor Jim Porto in 2016 asked the Board of Aldermen to rename the town. According to Alderwoman Jacquie Gist, "Changing Carrboro's name is not a realistic option". A name change would require legislative approval, and according to former mayor Mark Chilton, "You change it to something besides Carrboro, you're really asking to be interfered with by the state legislature, and it won't be for the best." In 2019, Carrboro erected a truth plaque, distancing the town from the values and actions of Julian Carr.

The Carrboro Board of Aldermen passed a resolution in 2017 calling for the removal of Silent Sam.

== Geography ==
According to the US Census Bureau, the town has a total area of 6.5 square miles (16.8 km^{2}), of which 6.4 square miles (16.7 km^{2}) is land and 0.03 square miles (0.08 km^{2}) is water.

Carrboro's 27510 zip code covers the town's core, and is an enclave surrounded on all sides by Chapel Hill's 27516 zip code, which also covers the outer areas of Carrboro.

=== Climate ===
Carrboro typically has a North American humid subtropical climate. Summer conditions are hot and humid, with daily average high temperatures of 85 °F (29 °C) and higher. Winter temperatures tend to remain above or well above freezing, though snowfall does happen and occasional snow and ice storms are not unusual. The average high temperature in July, the hottest month of the year, is 89 °F (32 °C), and the average high temperature in January, the coldest month, is 49 °F (9 °C). Average monthly precipitation ranges from 3.2 to 4.5 inches (8.1 to 11.4 cm), with the heaviest precipitation occurring during the summer months.

Climate data for Carrboro, North Carolina
Month	Jan	Feb	Mar	Apr	May	Jun	Jul	Aug	Sep	Oct	Nov	Dec	Year
Mean daily maximum °F (°C)	49 (9)	52 (11)	62 (17)	71 (22)	78 (26)	85 (29)	89 (32)	87 (31)	82 (28)	72 (22)	63 (17)	53 (12)	70 (21)
Mean daily minimum °F (°C)	26 (−3)	28 (−2)	36 (2)	44 (7)	53 (12)	61 (16)	65 (18)	64 (18)	57 (14)	45 (7)	37 (3)	29 (−2)	45 (8)
Average precipitation inches (mm)	3.7 (94)	3.9 (99)	4.2 (110)	3.2 (81)	4.5 (110)	4.4 (110)	4.1 (100)	4.4 (110)	3.2 (81)	3.5 (89)	3.5 (89)	3.5 (89)	46.0 (1,170)
Source: Weatherbase

== Demographics ==
Historical population
Census	Pop.	Note	%±
1920	1,129		—
1930	1,242		10.0%
1940	1,455		17.1%
1950	1,795		23.4%
1960	1,997		11.3%
1970	5,058		153.3%
1980	7,336		45.0%
1990	12,134		65.4%
2000	16,782		38.3%
2010	19,582		16.7%
2020	21,295		8.7%
2025 (est.)	20,962	▼	−1.6%
U.S. Decennial Census

=== 2020 census ===
As of the 2020 census, there were 21,295 people and 9,363 households, including 4,640 families, residing in the town. The median age was 32.9 years. 21.3% of residents were under the age of 18 and 9.8% were 65 years of age or older. For every 100 females there were 91.2 males, and for every 100 females age 18 and over there were 88.0 males.

99.7% of residents lived in urban areas, while 0.3% lived in rural areas.

Of the 9,363 households, 28.3% had children under the age of 18 living in them. Of all households, 36.3% were married-couple households, 22.9% were households with a male householder and no spouse or partner present, and 32.7% were households with a female householder and no spouse or partner present. About 35.3% of all households were made up of individuals, and 7.7% had someone living alone who was 65 years of age or older.

There were 9,912 housing units, of which 5.5% were vacant. The homeowner vacancy rate was 0.8% and the rental vacancy rate was 5.6%.

Carrboro racial composition
Race	Number	Percentage
White (non-Hispanic)	13,238	62.16%
Black or African American (non-Hispanic)	2,142	10.06%
Native American	39	0.18%
Asian	1,881	8.83%
Pacific Islander	10	0.05%
Other/Mixed	1,262	5.93%
Hispanic or Latino	2,723	12.79%

=== 2010 census ===
As of the census of 2010, there were 19,582 people, 8,625 households, and 4,020 families residing in the town. The population density was 3,018.9 inhabitants per square mile (1,165.6/km^{2}). There were 9,258 housing units at an average density of 1,424.3 per square mile (549.9/km^{2}). The racial makeup of the town was 70.9% White, 10.1% African American, 0.4% Native American, 8.2% Asian, 0.004% Pacific Islander, 7.5% some other race, and 2.9% from two or more races. Hispanic or Latino people of any race were 13.8% of the population.

There were 8,625 households, out of which 26.2% had children under the age of 18 living with them. 34.5% of all households were headed by married couples living together, 8.8% had a female householder with no husband present, and 53.4% were non-families. 35.5% of all households were made up of individuals, and 5.3% had someone living alone who was 65 years of age or older. The average household size was 2.27 and the average family size was 3.07.

In the town, the population was spread out, with 21.5% under the age of 18, 15.6% from 18 to 24, 36.1% from 25 to 44, 21.7% from 45 to 64, and 5.3% who were 65 years of age or older. The median age was 30.1 years. For every 100 females, there were 93.7 males. For every 100 females age 18 and over, there were 91.5 males.

=== Economy ===
Over the period 2008–2012, the median income for a household in the town was $45,159, and the median income for a family was $73,893. Males had a median income of $28,622 versus $26,198 for females. The per capita income for the town was $32,604. About 11.9% of families and 16.1% of the population were below the poverty line, including 21.4% of those under age 18 and 11.4% of those age 65 or over.

=== Diversity ===
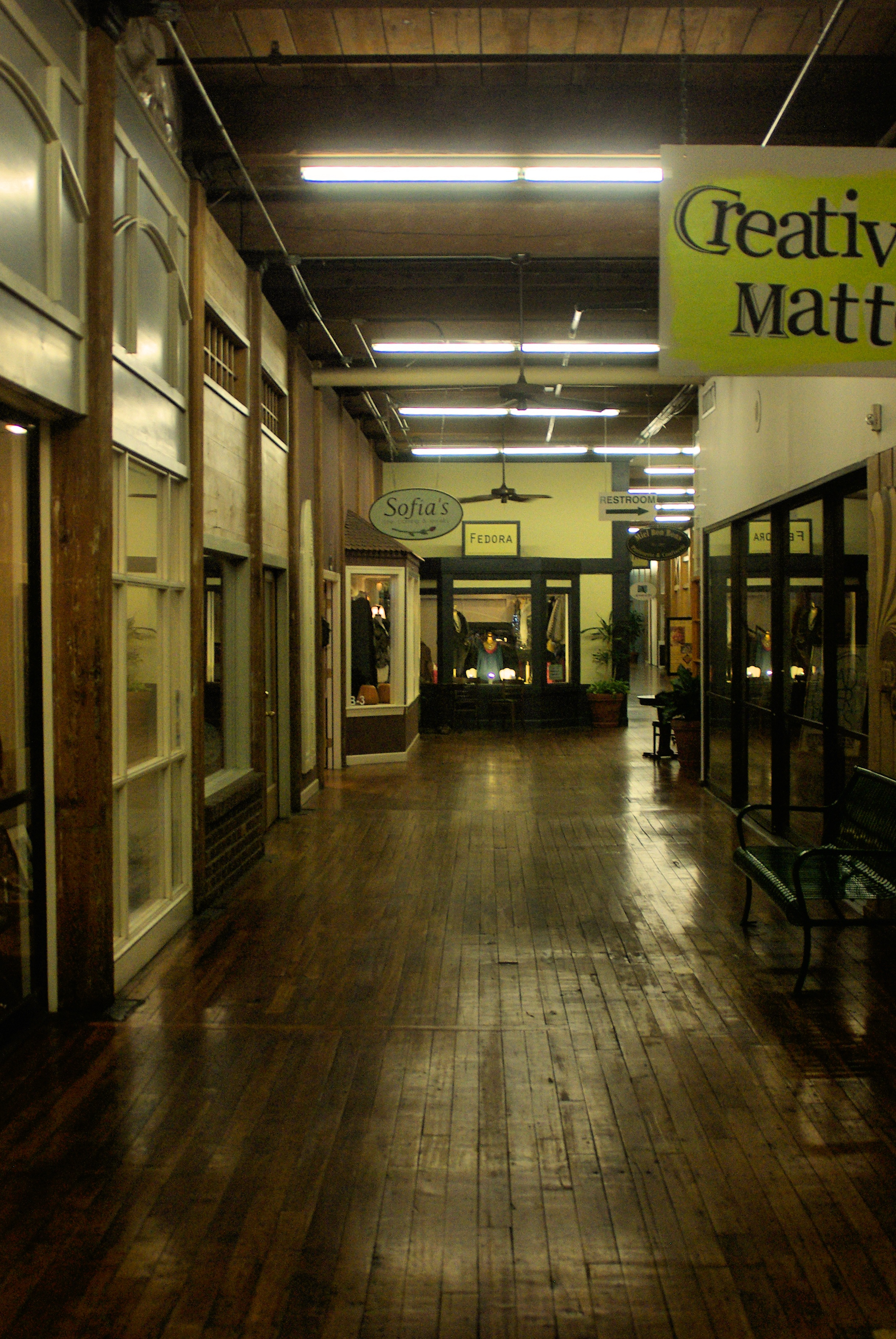
Interior of Carr Mill Mall

In the early 1990s, a sizable influx of Latino immigrants began moving to Carrboro, attracted by jobs in the building and service trades. The Hispanic population of Carrboro increased by 936% between 1990 and 2003, to 12% of the Carrboro population. As these immigrants settled in Carrboro, they brought the food and culture of their native countries to the town. Carrboro is now home to three Latino tiendas (grocery stores). Other businesses, including national grocery chains like Food Lion, adapted to the change in demographics by stocking a wider variety of Central and South American food products.

The Human Rights Center serves the Latinos, day laborers, Burmese and Karen populations. It petitioned the town government to adopt the Universal Declaration of Human Rights, which it did in 2009.

As with neighboring Chapel Hill, affordable housing has become a pressing local issue.

== Arts and culture ==
=== Attractions ===
One of Carrboro's attractions is the Carrboro Farmer's Market, which features local organic produce, locally produced cheeses, baked goods, and handmade crafts. Created in 1977, the Market was one of the first in the area to link farmers directly with their customers. The Market requires that everything sold must be produced within a 50-mile (80 km) radius of Carrboro. In addition to the Carrboro Farmers Market, the town eateries and specialty food shops have also garnered regional and national acclaim for their strong support of locally produced food. Carrboro is a favorite destination of UNC students for its relatively large number and diversity of restaurants. In 2005, Carrboro was named one of the 100 best art towns in America.

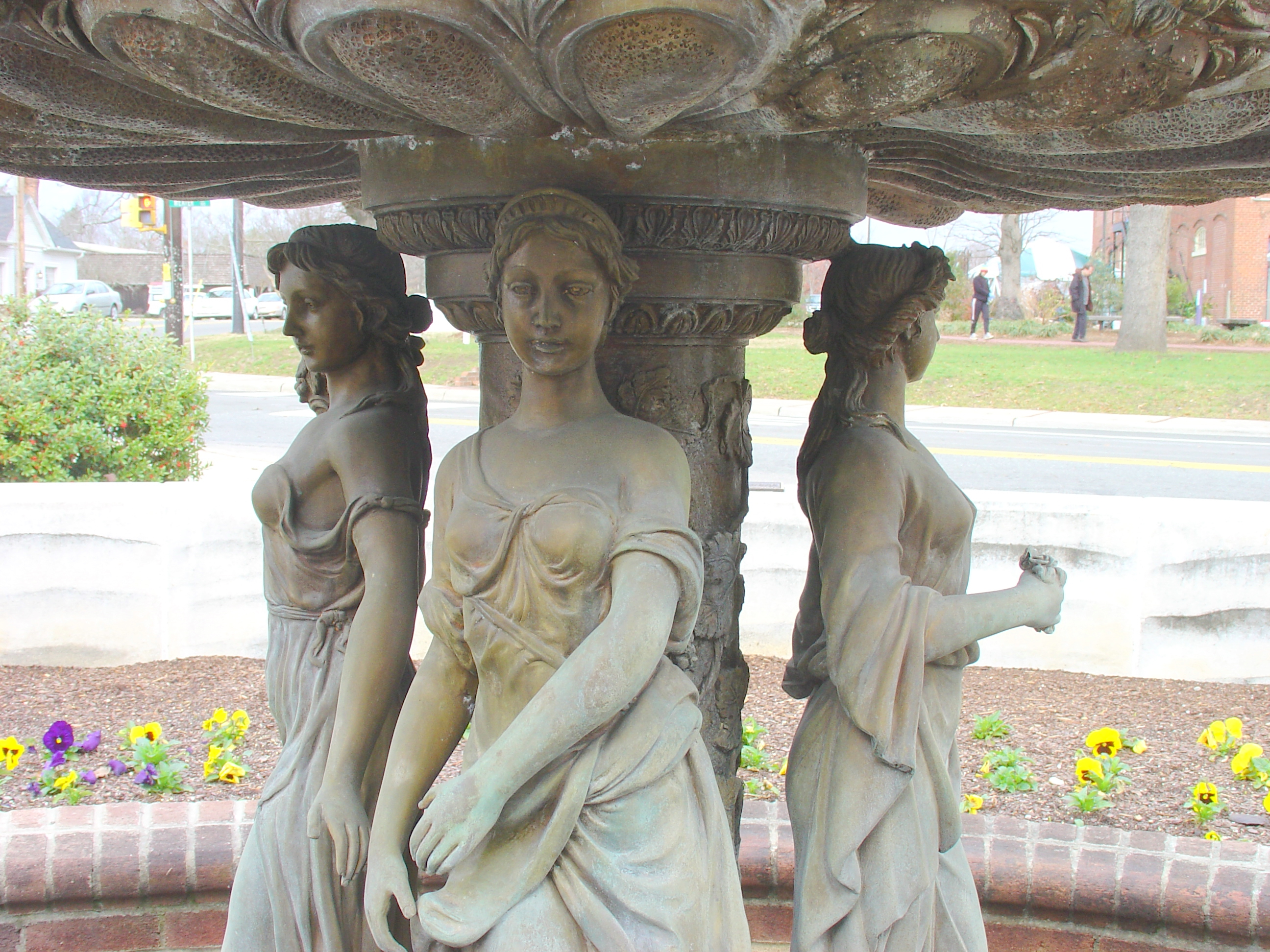
Millennium Fountain

Two music venues that host national and regional acts are located in Carrboro. The ArtsCenter has featured nationally known roots music acts, such as David Lindley, Leon Russell, and Dr. John as well as internationally known artists including Richard Thompson and k.d. lang. The ArtsCenter also holds art classes, dance classes, and art exhibitions. It was founded 1974 and moved from Main Street to its new location on Roberson Street summer 2023. The Cat's Cradle, open for more than 50 years, hosts a diverse range of national and international musicians and performers like Nirvana, Public Enemy, John Mayer, Joan Baez, and Iggy Pop.

The 84-seat Dirty South Institute (DSI) Comedy Theater in Carrboro, opened in 2006, boasted a local company of 50+ active performers and a national network of comedians. It was the home of the DSI Comedy School, which offered classes to the public every month in the art of improv, stand-up and sketch comedy. Amid scandal, DSI Comedy Theater closed on August 28, 2017. The space re-opened a few months later as the PIT Chapel Hill, a branch of the Peoples Improv Theater founded by Ali Reza Farahnakian, a former "Saturday Night Live" writer and UNC alumnus.

The Carrboro Historic District, north of downtown, contains the distinctive architecture of the approximately 150 mill houses built by Lloyd and Carr for the mill workers at the Alberta Cotton Mill and their families. Many of these homes have since been razed, but numerous others have been restored; a number of these homes, centered on Shelton Street, are occupied by (particularly graduate) students at the nearby University of North Carolina at Chapel Hill, however, increasing housing costs have resulted in a downwards trend in the student population of this area.

=== Annual cultural events ===
The town is known for the Carrboro Music Festival, a free all-day event which celebrates local music with over 150 acts performing at dozens of locations in the downtown area. The music festival began in 1998 as the Fête de la Musique, and was held on the summer solstice. In 2002, the name of the event was changed to the Carrboro Music Festival and, in order to increase attendance by avoiding the summer heat, moved to the fall. In 2013, the festival expanded to two days. Carrboro is also home to the annual West End Poetry Festival, which draws in a great selection of local poets.

In November, Carrboro hosts its annual film festival. The Carrboro Film Festival was started in 2006 by Carrboro Arts Committee members Jackie Helvey and Nic Beery, with support from Board of Aldermen and the Carrboro Recreation and Parks Department. The idea behind the Carrboro Film Festival is to promote local area shorts films that are twenty minutes or less. The first year, there were nearly 100 entires. From those, a day filled with fabulous films was created, and that tradition has continued over the years. In 2013, the festival expanded to two days, accepting submissions from across the entire state of North Carolina and beyond.

Carrboro has also had a yearly Pride Promenade, where a rainbow goat is escorted down to the town commons where food trucks, drag shows and other events take place.

=== Libraries ===
Carrboro is home to two branches of the Orange County Public Library System: the Carrboro Branch Library and the Carrboro Cybrary. Until early 2025, the Carrboro Branch Library was located in McDougle Elementary and Middle School. In March 2025, the Drakeford Library Complex opened in downtown Carrboro, housing the Orange County Public Library's Southern Branch. Services include a medium-sized circulating collection of books, audiobooks, movies on DVD and VHS, and music CDs; computer and Internet access; magazines; and local and national newspapers. The Carrboro Cybrary is located in the Century Center in downtown Carrboro. Services include a small circulating collection of contemporary fiction, nonfiction, audiobooks, and Spanish and English language learning materials; computer, Internet, and wireless access; magazines; and local and national newspapers. Orange County residents may access these services free of charge, and nonresidents may access the computers free of charge.

== Sports ==
Carrboro is home to some of the originators of the modern hooping movement. In 2001, Vivian Spiral began hooping on the Weaver Street Market lawn during the weekly music events. Julia Hartsell joined her for the 2002 music season. Jonathan Baxter, founder of the HoopPath, also lives and teaches hooping in Carrboro. The first annual HoopPath Retreat was held Carrboro in 2007 and still happens there every year. The Hoop Convergence, started in 2008, is also held annually in Carrboro and the surrounding area. Synergy FlowArts, a manufacturer of hoops and other flow props, was formed in 2010.

== Parks and recreation ==
Carrboro has 11 parks, from large community parks to small neighborhood parks and play areas. The 55-acre (220,000 m^{2}) Henry Anderson Community Park contains multiple lighted baseball fields, basketball courts, tennis courts, a large fenced dog park, a 2.4 acre fishing pond and other recreational facilities. The Adams Tract is a 27-acre (110,000 m^{2}) urban forest area near the center of town that contains 1.25 miles (2.01 km) of trails for walking and hiking. The Dr. Martin Luther King Jr. Park (10.2 acres) was planned with public input and opened in January 2020. It contains a multi-purpose field, community garden, bicycle pump track, play equipment, amphitheater, pavilions.Dr. Martin Luther King Jr. Park | Carrboro, NC - Official WebsiteCarrboro Cuts the Ribbon on New Dr. Martin Luther King Jr. Park Several neighborhood parks and other facilities provide multipurpose fields, playground equipment and restrooms. Athletic fields, meeting rooms, kitchen, and pavilions are available for reservation

== Government ==
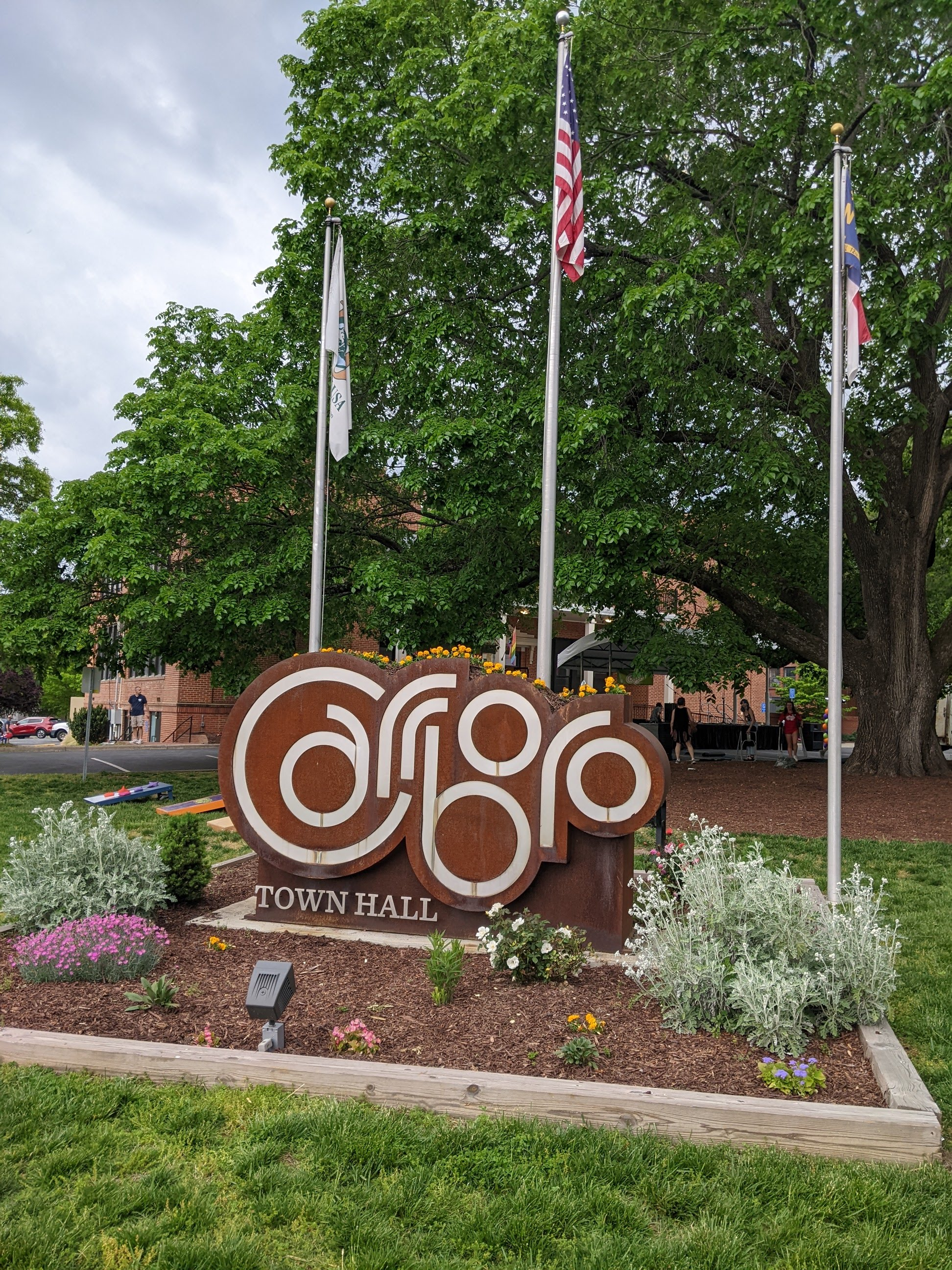
The Carrboro town hall sign, May 2022

Carrboro operates under a council–manager form of government. The governing body of the town, the Town Council, consists of a mayor and six council members. The mayor, who is elected every two years, presides at all meetings of the Town Council and votes on all issues to the same extent as any other member of the council. The council members are elected for staggered terms of four years. All city elections, which are held in November of odd-numbered years, are at-large and nonpartisan and are decided by a simple plurality. Town operations are managed by the town manager, who is appointed by the Town Council.

Carrboro is in the 4th Congressional district of North Carolina and is represented by Valerie Foushee. At the state level, Carrboro is in Senate district 23 (represented by Jonah Garson) and House district 56 (represented by Rep. Allen Buansi).

== Education ==
The Chapel Hill-Carrboro City Schools manages public primary and secondary education for more than 11,000 students in and around Carrboro and Chapel Hill. The Chapel Hill-Carrboro Public Schools consistently rank as number one in North Carolina in terms of graduation rate, test scores and percentage of college-bound seniors. Elementary school students in Carrboro attend Carrboro Elementary School, McDougle Elementary School, Morris Grove Elementary School, Frank Porter Graham Elementary School, or Seawell Elementary School. Middle school students in Carrboro attend Culbreth Middle School, McDougle Middle School, or Smith Middle School. High school students living in Carrboro attend either Carrboro High School or Chapel Hill High School.

== Media ==
Carrboro is served, along with Chapel Hill, by WCHL Radio (1360 AM, 97.9 FM) and its associated website chapelboro.com. Both communities are also served by the Chapel Hill News, a subsidiary of the Raleigh News & Observer, and the student newspaper at the University of North Carolina, The Daily Tar Heel.

In June 2004, WCOM began broadcasting at 103.5 FM in Carrboro and is streamed live over the internet at wcomfm.org. WCOM is a low-power FM (LPFM) radio station entirely volunteer-run featuring locally produced music and community affairs programming.

The Carrboro Citizen was a locally owned community newspaper based in Carrboro. Launched in March 2007, the Citizen was published weekly (on Thursdays) and was distributed free throughout town and the surrounding area. In 2012, the Citizen's owners sought a new owner to continue publication, but a buyer was not found. Its 290th and final issue was published on October 4, 2012.

== Notable people ==
- Jonathan Byrd, singer-songwriter
- Elizabeth 'Libba' Cotten, folk guitarist and author of "Freight Train"
- Whammy Douglas, Major League Baseball player
- Jesse Kalisher, photographer
- Anne-Claire Niver, singer-songwriter
- Joanna Pearson, novelist, poet, short-story writer
- Dexter Romweber, singer-songwriter
- Eliza McLamb, singer-songwriter

== Nickname ==
Carrboro's nickname, "The Paris of the Piedmont," stems from a sardonic comment by John Martin, a reporter for the Chapel Hill Weekly. In 1970, Nyle Frank, now a musician but then a graduate student in political science at the nearby University of North Carolina, organized an alternative "Invisible University," and announced plans to have himself crowned as the institution's "King" in Carrboro. Martin commented, "I can see it now − The Paris of the Piedmont."

== Sister cities ==
Carrboro has four sister cities:

- Celaya, Guanajuato, Mexico
- Juventino Rosas, Guanajuato, Mexico
- San Jorge, Nicaragua
- Saratov, Russia

== See also ==
- List of sundown towns in the United States
- Hollywood Theater
