= Friday Center for Continuing Education =

Coordinates: 35.8998°N 79.0124°W

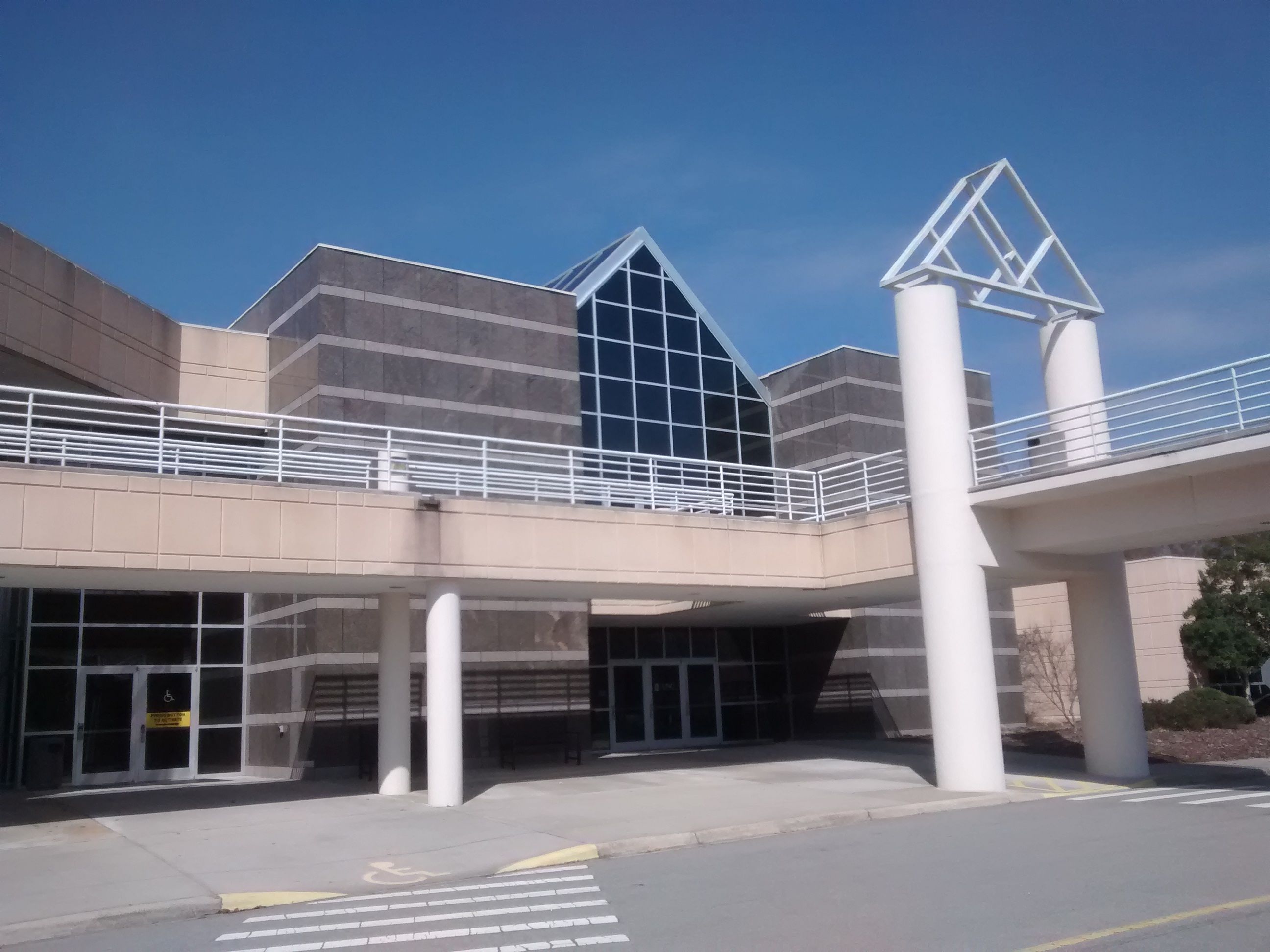
The William and Ida Friday Center for Continuing Education

Digital and Lifelong Learning at the Friday Conference Center is a unit of the University of North Carolina at Chapel Hill. The department was created to serve the needs of nontraditional students through continuing education programs and services.

== Digital and Lifelong Learning at the Friday Conference Center ==
Digital and Lifelong Learning has three main areas of operation: a conference center, credit programs for part-time students, and professional development and enrichment programs.

== Credit programs ==
Through the Friday Center's Credit Programs for Part-time Students, part-time learners can take classes on the UNC-Chapel Hill campus or from a distance. Distance education courses can be taken online or by correspondence, within a semester schedule or in self-paced format. Through Digital and Lifelong Learning, both undergraduate and post-baccalaureate students have access to most courses offered by UNC-Chapel Hill without needing to be admitted as full-time students.

== Professional development and enrichment programs ==
Digital and Lifelong Learning offers noncredit courses and seminars for personal enrichment and professional development.

Community Programs Each spring and fall, Digital and Lifelong learning announces a new collection of community program events in its Community Classroom Series. These events, led by UNC faculty and staff and local professionals, are typically held a few times per year.

Professional Development Digital and Lifelong Learning offers professional development programs and bootcamps on coding, marketing, data analytics, paralegal studies, RN refresher courses, primary care, academic leadership, product management, cybersecurity, and artificial intelligence. Digital and Lifelong Learning's professional development offerings are developed in partnership with university experts and professional associations.

== Conference facility ==
The Friday Conference Center facility was built in 1991, primarily to serve the conference facility needs of the university. Distinguishing elements of the building include a glass ceiling and polished granite interior walls. The center hosts approximately 600 events with around 50,000 participants annually. Meeting rooms and audiovisual support systems are designed to support the needs of adult learners. The building has 23 meeting areas. The building is located about three miles (5 km) from the heart of the UNC-Chapel Hill campus, with close access to major highways.

Meeting Rooms Meeting space consists of 25,000 square feet (2,300 m^{2}). Most rooms have built-in projection and sound systems, remote light-dimming systems, handicapped accessibility, and ergonomically designed seating. Meeting spaces include a 420-seat auditorium, a seminar room, large and small meeting rooms with flexible seating options, a smart classroom with 25 direct fiber-optic connections, an executive boardroom, a 416-seat dining room, lounges, and day offices.

Use Policy All programs conducted at the Friday Center must have a clearly identifiable continuing education component.

== William and Ida Friday ==
Digital and Lifelong Learning at the Friday Conference Center was originally the William and Ida Friday Center for Continuing Education and was named in honor of two prominent North Carolinians noted for lifetime service to education, the arts, and public health. William C. Friday served as president of the University of North Carolina for thirty years. A painter and sculptor, his wife Ida Friday has promoted the arts and has played an active role in North Carolina's civic, cultural, and educational organizations. The Fridays have received numerous awards and honors, including the North Carolina Public Service Award and the Long Leaf Pine Award for their service to the state. Mr. and Mrs. Friday are graduates of UNC-Chapel Hill, where Mr. Friday earned a degree in law and Mrs. Friday earned a master's degree in public health.
