= List of Pete Buttigieg 2020 presidential campaign endorsements =

Pete for America
- Campaign: 2020 United States presidential election (Democratic primaries)
- Candidate: Pete Buttigieg; Mayor of South Bend, Indiana (2012–2020)
- Affiliation: Democratic Party
- Status: Announced: April 14, 2019; Suspended: March 1, 2020
- Headquarters: South Bend, Indiana
- Receipts: US$51,549,046.28
- Slogan: It's time for a new generation of American leadership

Website
- www.peteforamerica.com

This is a list of notable individuals and organizations who have voiced their endorsement of Pete Buttigieg's campaign for the Democratic Party's nomination for the 2020 U.S. presidential election.

== Federal officials ==
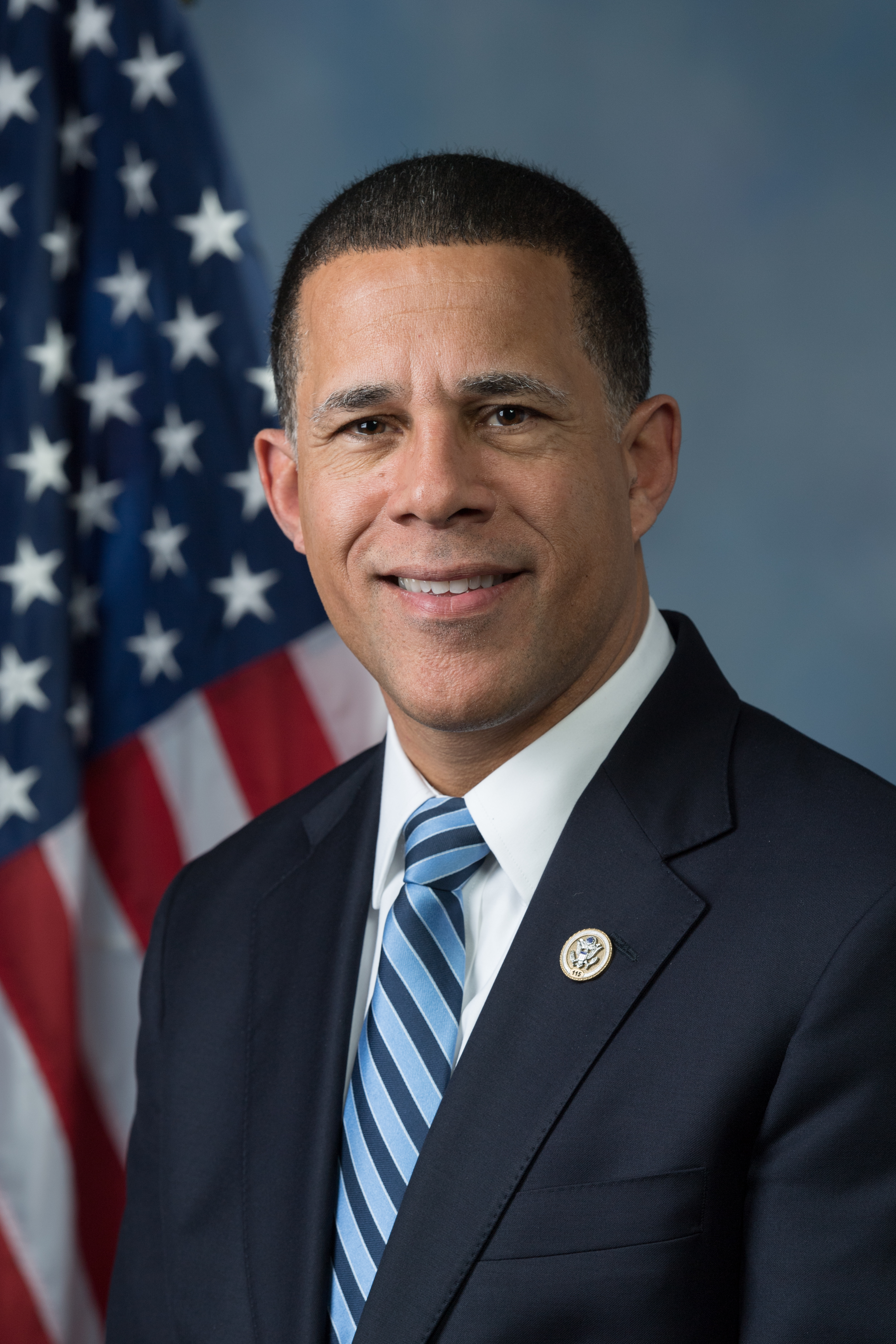
Anthony Brown

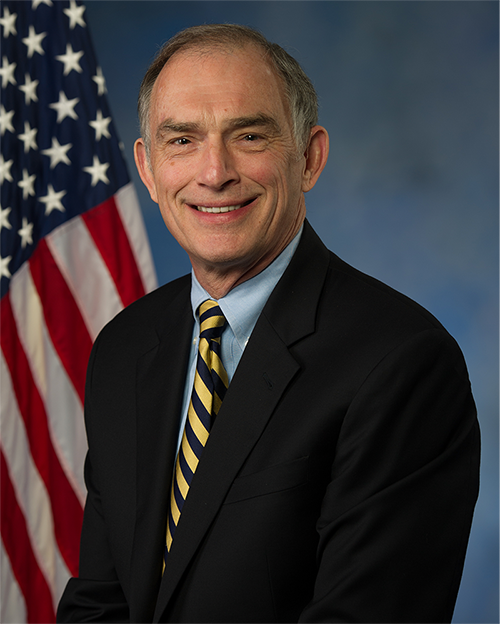
Pete Visclosky

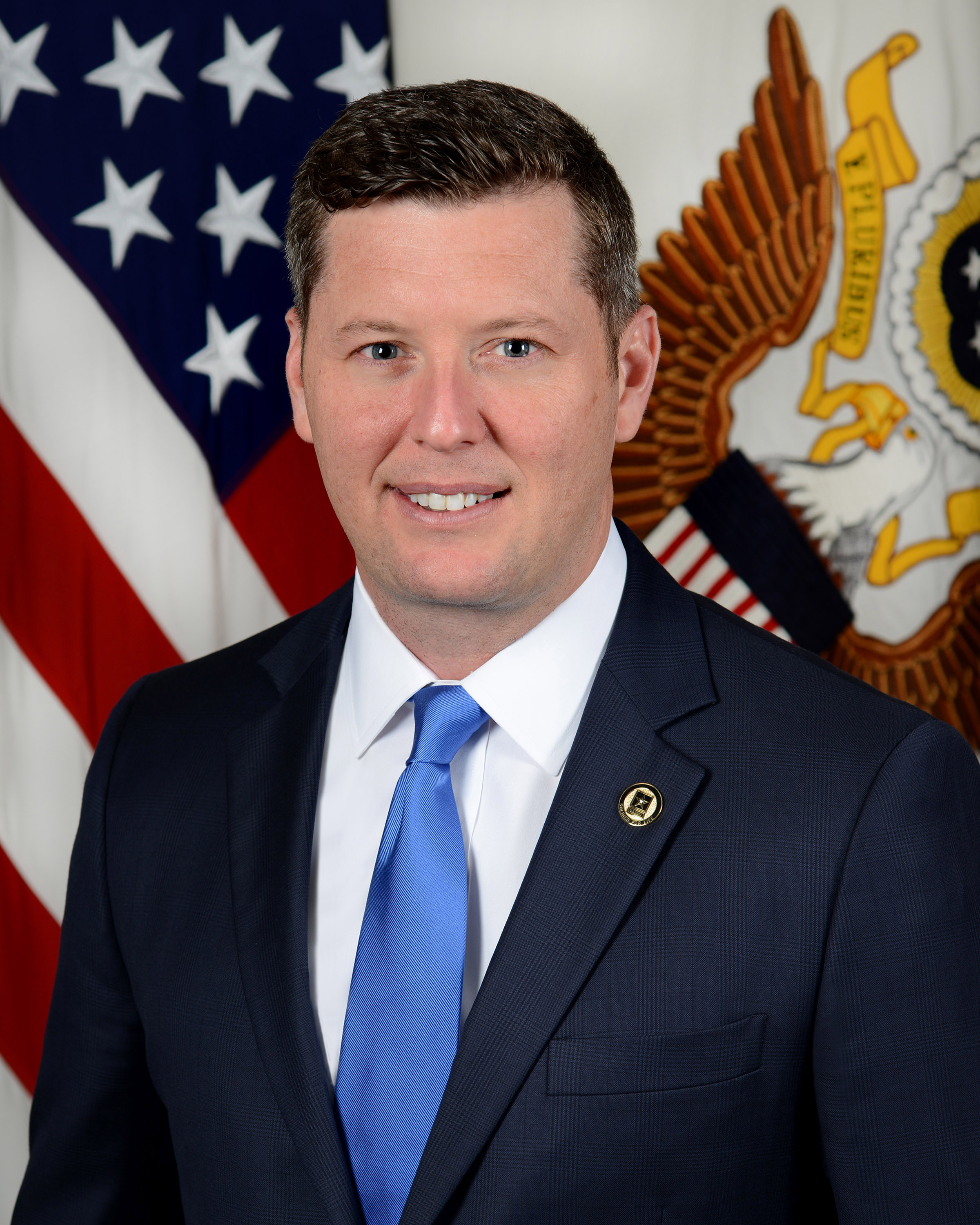
Patrick Murphy

=== U.S. representatives ===
==== Current ====
- Pete Visclosky, U.S. Representative from IN-01 since 1985
- Dave Loebsack, U.S. Representative from IA-02 since 2007
- Anthony Brown, U.S. Representative from MD-04 since 2017; former Lieutenant Governor of Maryland (2007–2015)
- Annie Kuster, U.S. Representative from NH-02 since 2013
- Kathleen Rice, U.S. Representative from NY-04 since 2015 (previously endorsed Beto O'Rourke)
- Don Beyer, U.S. Representative from VA-08 since 2015; former U.S. Ambassador to Switzerland and Liechtenstein (2009–2013); former Lieutenant Governor of Virginia (1990–1998)
- Andy Kim, U.S. Representative from NJ-03 since 2018 (previously endorsed Cory Booker)

==== Former ====
- Patrick Murphy, former U.S. Representative from PA-08 (2007–2011), former Under Secretary of the Army (2016–2017), former Acting United States Secretary of the Army (2016)

=== White House officials ===
==== Former ====
- David Cohen, former CIA Deputy Director for Operations (1995–1997)
- Linda Douglass, former director of communications for the White House Office of Health Reform
- Eric Fanning, former Secretary of the Army (2016–2017)
- Austan Goolsbee, former chairman of the Council of Economic Advisers
- Philip H. Gordon, former Assistant Secretary of State (2009–2013), former special assistant to Obama (2013–2015)
- Reggie Love, former special assistant and personal aide to Barack Obama
- Ned Price, former National Security Council Spokesman
- Frank Sanchez, former Under Secretary of Commerce for International Trade (2010–2013)
- Vali Nasr, former State Department advisor (2010–2012)

=== U.S. ambassadors ===
==== Former ====
- Tim Broas, former U.S. Ambassador to the Netherlands (2014–2016) (Co-endorsement with Joe Biden)
- William Eacho, former U.S. Ambassador to Austria (2009–2013) (Co-endorsement with Joe Biden)
- Peter Galbraith, former Deputy UN Envoy to Afghanistan (2009) and former U.S. Ambassador to Croatia (1993–1998)
- David Jacobson, former U.S. Ambassador to Canada (2009–2013)
- John R. Phillips, former U.S. Ambassador to Italy (2009–2013); former U.S. Ambassador to San Marino (2009–2013)
- Theodore Sedgwick, former U.S. Ambassador to Slovakia (2010–2015)
- Suzan "Suzi" LeVine, former U.S. Ambassador to Switzerland (2014–2017)

== State officials ==
=== State executive officials ===
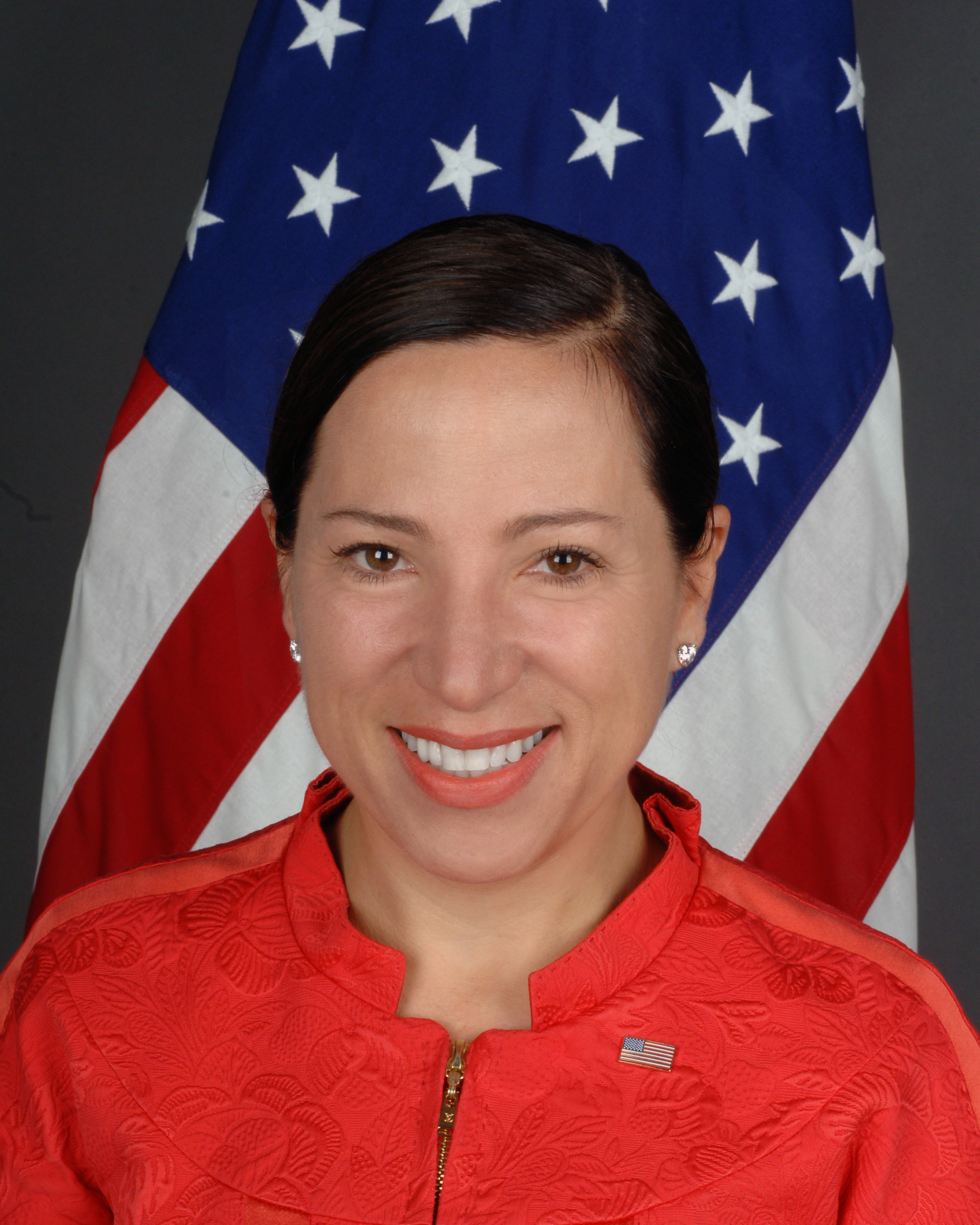
Eleni Kounalakis

==== Current ====
- Henry Beck, State Treasurer of Maine since 2019, former Member of the Maine House of Representatives (2008–2016)
- Cyrus Habib, Lieutenant Governor of Washington since 2017, former member of the Washington Senate (2015–2017), former member of the Washington House of Representatives (2013–2015)
- Eleni Kounalakis, Lieutenant Governor of California since 2019, former U.S. Ambassador to Hungary (2010–2013) (previously endorsed Kamala Harris)

=== State legislators ===
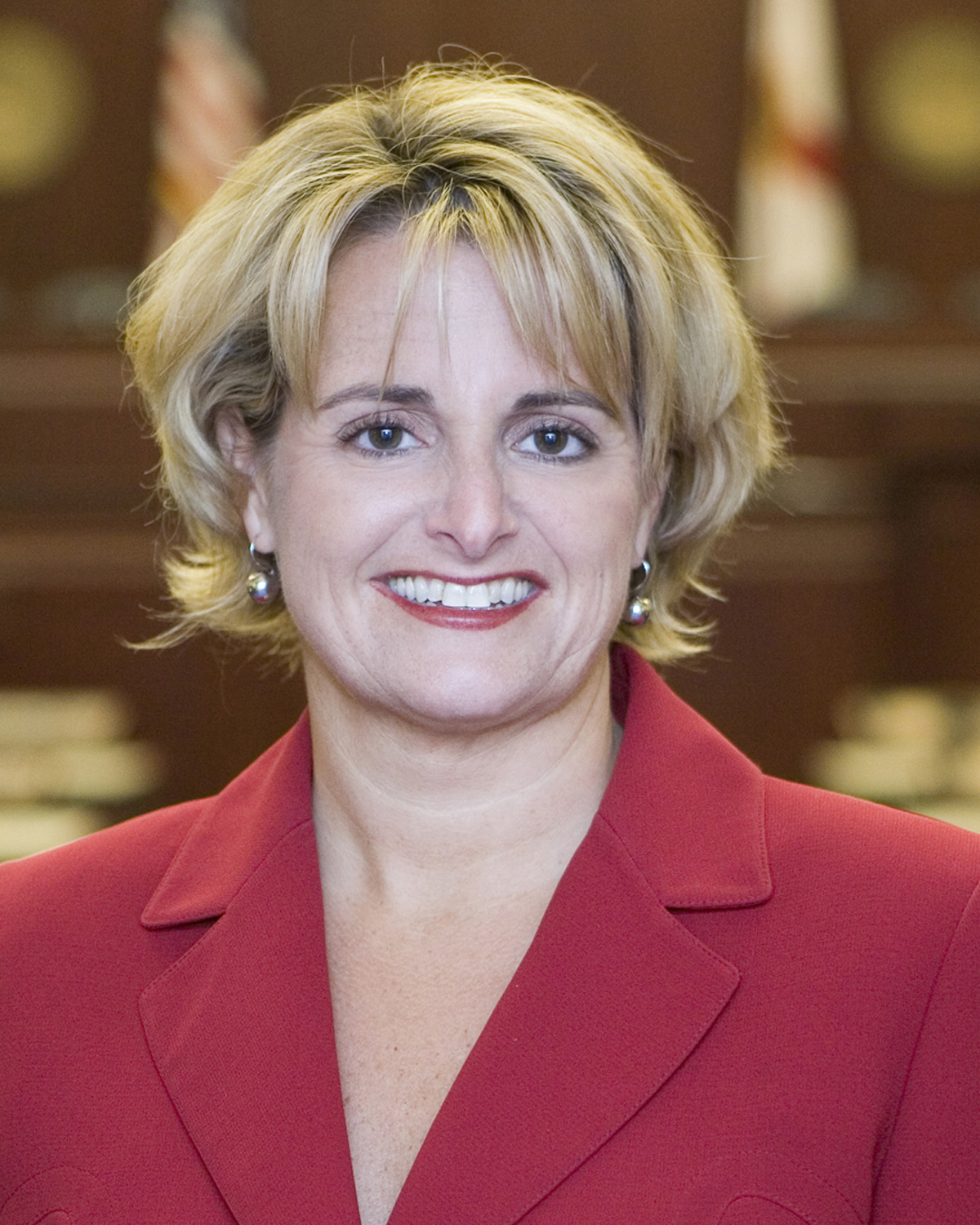
Loranne Ausley

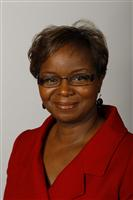
Deborah Berry

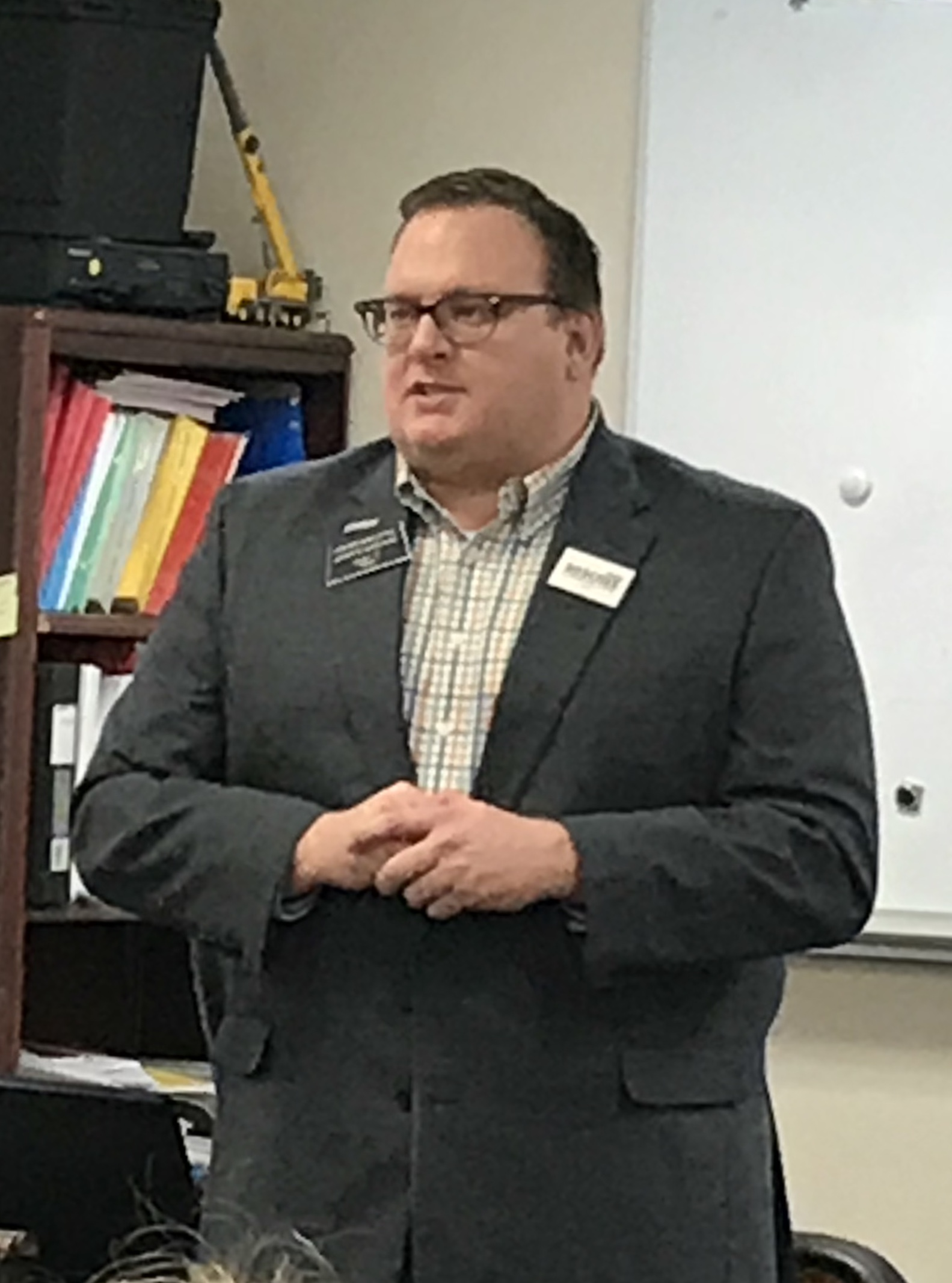
Joshua Boschee

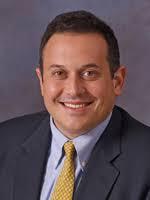
Ben Diamond

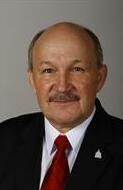
William Dotzler

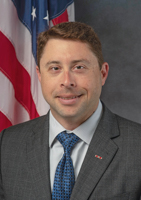
Adam Hattersley

==== Current ====
Sorted by states, role and family name

- Jennifer Arndt, Colorado Representative from the 53rd District of Colorado since 2015;
- Bob Duff, Connecticut State Senator and Majority Leader of the Connecticut State Senate since 2015; Connecticut State Representative from the 25th District since 2005
- Loranne Ausley, Florida State Representative from District 9 since 2016
- Ben Diamond, Florida State Representative from District 68 since 2016
- Adam Hattersley, Florida State Representative from District 59 since 2018
- Matthew Wilson, Georgia State Representative from District 80 since 2019
- Stephanie Kifowit, Illinois State Representative from District 84 since 2013
- Lamont Robinson, Illinois State Representative from the 5th District since 2019
- Tony Bisignano, Iowa State Senator from District 34 (1993–1997) and District 17 (2015–present); former Iowa State Representative from District 80 (1987–1993)
- William Dotzler, Iowa State Senator from the 11th district, former Iowa State Representative from District 26 (1997–2003)
- Brian Meyer, Iowa State Representative from District 33 since 2013 (Previously endorsed Beto O'Rourke)
- Jo Oldson, Iowa State Representative since 2003 from District 41 (since 2013) and from District 61 (2003–2013)
- Scott Ourth, Iowa State Representative from District 26 since 2013
- Kristin Sunde, Iowa State Representative from District 42 (2019–present)
- Phyllis Thede, Iowa State House Representative from District 93 since 2009 (previously endorsed Kamala Harris)
- Kirill Reznik, Maryland Delegate from the 39th district since 2007
- Pat Young, Maryland Delegate from the 44th district since 2015
- Will Smith, Maryland Senator from the 20th District since 2016
- Michael Rodrigues, Massachusetts State Senator from Bristol and Plymouth District 1 since 2011; former Massachusetts State Representative from Bristol District 8 (1996–2011)
- Adam Hollier, Michigan State Senator from the 2nd District since 2018
- Sandra Jauregui, Nevada Assemblywoman from the 41st District since 2016 (Previously endorsed Kamala Harris)
- Susan Almy, New Hampshire State Representative from Grafton District 13 since 1996
- Martha Hennessey, New Hampshire State Senator from New Hampshire's 5th State Senate District since 2016; New Hampshire State Representative from the Grafton 12th District 2014–2016 (Previously endorsed Cory Booker)
- Diane Langley, New Hampshire State Representative from Hillsborough District 8 since 2018
- Joelle Martin, New Hampshire State Representative from Hillsborough District 23 since 2016
- David Morrill, New Hampshire State Representative from Cheshire District 4 since 2018
- Andrew O'Hearne, New Hampshire State Representative from Sullivan District 3 since 2008
- Cole Riel, New Hampshire State Representative from Hillsborough District 6 since 2018
- Matthew Wilhelm, New Hampshire State Representative from Hillsborough District 42 since 2018
- Amy Paulin, New York State Assemblywoman from District 88 since 2001
- Robert J. Rodriguez, New York State Assemblyman from District 68 since 2011
- James Skoufis, New York State Senator from District 39 since 2019
- Grier Martin, Member of the North Carolina House of Representatives from Wake County since 2005
- Joshua Boschee, Minority Leader of the North Dakota House of Representatives since 2018; North Dakota House of Representatives from District 44 since 2012
- Casey Weinstein, Ohio State Representative from District 37 since 2019
- Ryan W. Pearson, Senior Deputy Majority Leader of the Rhode Island Senate since 2018; Rhode Island State Senator from District 19 since 2013
- K. Joseph Shekarchi, Majority Leader of the Rhode Island House of Representatives since 2017 and Rhode Island State Representative for District 23 since 2013
- Justine Caldwell, Rhode Island State Representative for District 30 since 2019
- J. A. Moore, South Carolina State Representative from District 15 since 2019 (previously endorsed Kamala Harris)
- Jeff Yarbro, Minority Leader of the Tennessee Senate since 2019; Tennessee State Senator from District 21 since 2015
- Adam Ebbin, Virginia State Senator from Alexandria, Arlington County and Fairfax County in the 30th district

==== Former ====
- Sean Shaw, former Florida State Representative from District 61 (2016–2018) and 2018 Democratic nominee for Attorney General of Florida
- Steve Warnstadt, former Iowa State Senator from District 1 (2003–2011); former Iowa State Representative from District 2 (1995–2003)
- Daryl Beall, former Iowa State Senator from District 5 (2003–2015)
- Jean Hall Lloyd-Jones, former Iowa State Senator from District 23 (1987–1995); former Iowa State Representative from District 73 (1979–1983) and District 46 (1983–1987); first Iowa woman nominated by a major party for the U.S. Senate
- John Wittneben, former Iowa State Representative for District 7 (2011–2013) (Previously endorsed Klobuchar)
- Andrew Wenthe, former Iowa State Representative for District 18 (2007–2013); mayor of Fayette, Iowa since 2014
- Paul Scherrman, former Iowa State Representative for District 33 (1997–2003)
- Michael Moreland, former Iowa State Representative for District 39 (1993–1998)
- Thomas Fey, former Iowa State Representative for District 81 (1982) and District 41 (1983–1990)
- Deborah Berry, former Iowa State Representative from District 22 (2003–2012) and District 62 (2012–2017)
- Patricia Farley, former Nevada State Senator for District 8 (2014–2018)
- Bonnie Parnell, former Nevada Assemblywoman for District 40 (2004–2010)
- Rick Trombly, former New Hampshire State Senator from District 7 (1998–2000); former New Hampshire State Representative from Merrimack 10 (1978–1984) and Merrimack 4 (1986–1998) and former New Hampshire House of Representatives Democratic Floor Leader; executive director of the New Hampshire State Teachers Association since 2012
- Mark Fernald, former New Hampshire State Senator for District 11 (1998–2002)
- Andy White, former New Hampshire State Representative for Grafton District 13 (2009–2018)
- Joe Schiavoni, former Ohio State Senator for District 33 (2009–2018), Former Senate Minority Leader of the Ohio Senate
- James Celebrezze, former Ohio State Representative from District 4 (1967–1974) and former judge on the Supreme Court of Ohio

== Municipal officials ==
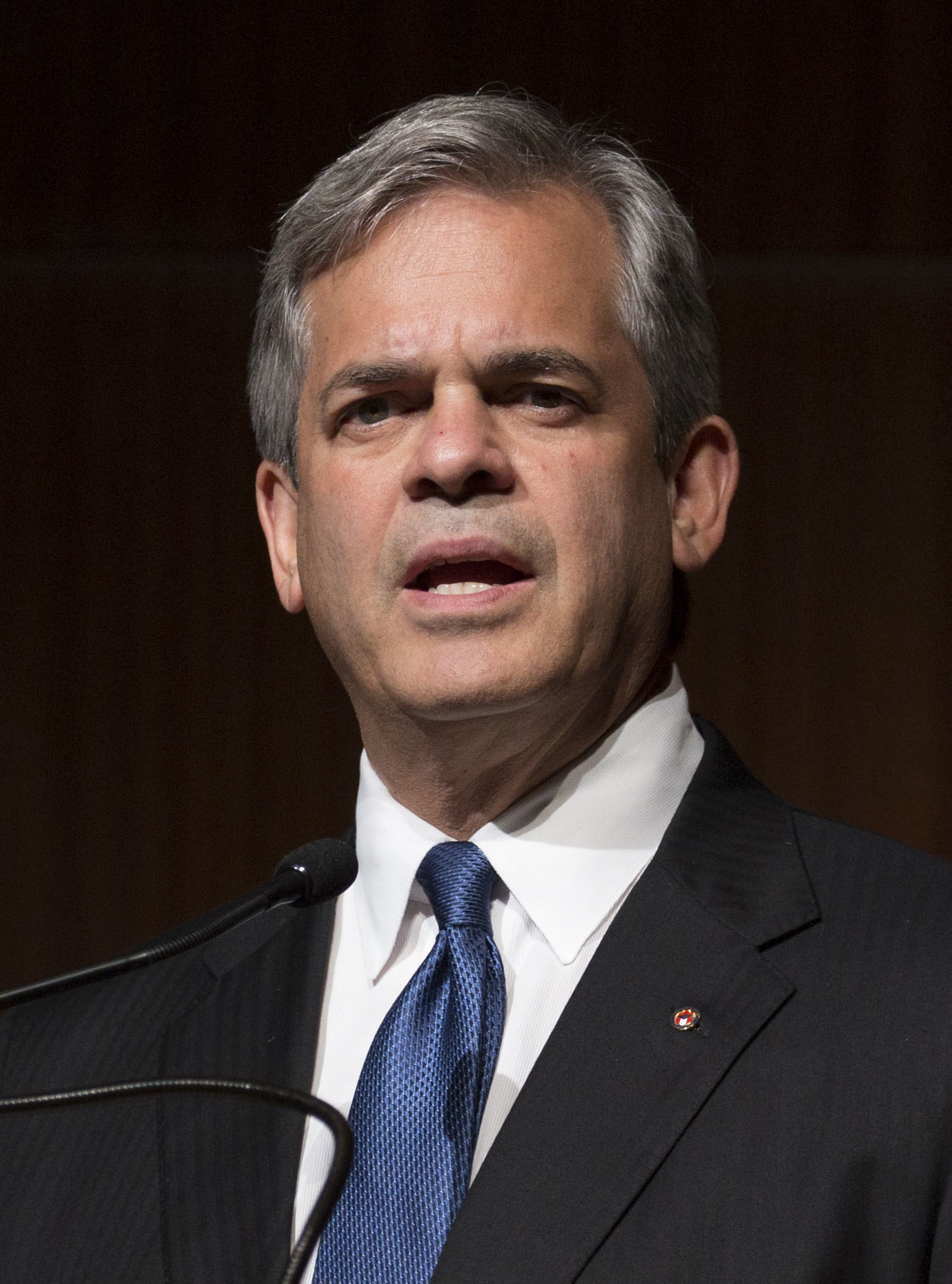
Steve Adler

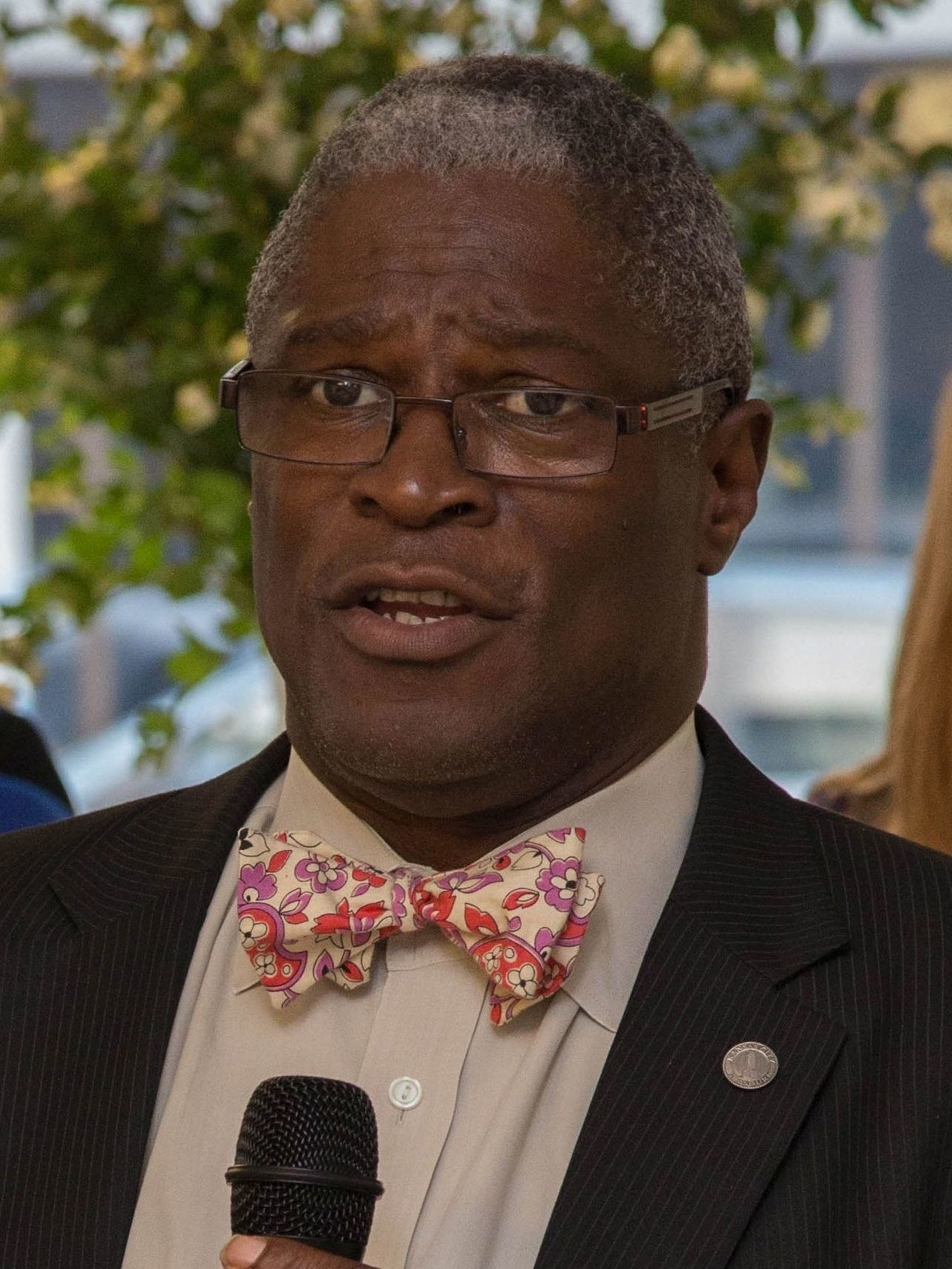
Sly James

=== Mayors ===
==== Current ====
- Steve Adler, Mayor of Austin, Texas since 2015
- Andy Berke, Mayor of Chattanooga, Tennessee since 2013
- Rosalynn Bliss, Mayor of Grand Rapids, Michigan since 2016
- Noam Bramson, Mayor of New Rochelle, New York since 2006
- Luke Bronin, Mayor of Hartford, Connecticut since 2016
- Christopher Cabaldon, Mayor of West Sacramento, California since 1998
- Tracie M. Clemons, Mayor of Norway, South Carolina since 2019
- John Cranley, Mayor of Cincinnati, Ohio since 2013
- Michelle De La Isla, Mayor of Topeka, Kansas since 2018
- Jim Donchess, Mayor of Nashua, New Hampshire, since 2015
- Jorge Elorza, Mayor of Providence, Rhode Island since 2015
- Leirion Gaylor Baird, Mayor of Lincoln, Nebraska since 2019
- Reed Gusciora, Mayor of Trenton, New Jersey since 2018
- Steve Hagerty, Mayor of Evanston, Illinois since 2017
- Joe Hogsett, Mayor of Indianapolis, Indiana since 2016
- Christine Hunschofsky, Mayor of Parkland, Florida since 2017
- Lydia Lavelle, Mayor of Carrboro, North Carolina since 2013
- Thomas McDermott Jr., Mayor of Hammond, Indiana since 2004
- Lauren McLean, Mayor of Boise, Idaho since 2020
- Erin Mendenhall, Mayor of Salt Lake City since 2020
- James Mueller, Mayor of South Bend, Indiana since 2020
- Tari Renner, Mayor of Bloomington, Illinois since 2013
- Terence Roberts, Mayor of Anderson, South Carolina since 2006 (previously endorsed Cory Booker)
- Dean Trantalis, Mayor of Fort Lauderdale, Florida since 2018
- Nan Whaley, Mayor of Dayton, Ohio since 2014
- Jenny Wilson, Mayor of Salt Lake County, Utah since 2019

==== Former ====
- Jim Gray, former mayor of Lexington, Kentucky (2011–2019)
- Betsy Hodges, former mayor of Minneapolis, Minnesota (2006–2014)
- Sly James, former mayor of Kansas City, Missouri (2011–2019)
- Mark Kleinschmidt, former mayor of Chapel Hill, North Carolina (2009–2015)
- Linda Langston, former Linn County, Iowa supervisor
- Nelda Martinez, former mayor of the City of Corpus Christi, Texas (2012–2016), former Member of Corpus Christi City Council from the at-large district (2007–2012)
- Annise Parker, former mayor of Houston, Texas (2010–2016), 14th City Controller of Houston (2004–2010), former Member of the Houston City Council (1998–2004)
- Michael Signer, former mayor of Charlottesville, Virginia (2016–2018)
- Ted Wilson, former mayor of Salt Lake City, Utah (1976–1985)

=== Other local officials ===
==== Current ====
- Sim Gill, district attorney for Salt Lake County, Utah since 2010
- Bryan Newland, chair of the Bay Mills Indian Community
- Danny O'Connor, Franklin County Auditor, Columbus, Ohio; 2018 special election nominee for the Ohio's 12th congressional district
- Pat Ryan, County Executive for Ulster County, New York since 2019

=== Former or retired local officials ===
- Ronnie Eldridge, New York City Councilwoman representing parts of Manhattan (1989-2001)

== Party officials ==
=== DNC members ===
==== Current ====
- Colleen Condon, chair of the Charleston County South Carolina Democratic Party
- Keith Harper, member of the 2020 Democratic National Committee

==== Former ====
- Steven Grossman, former chair of the Democratic National Committee (1997–1999); former chair of the Massachusetts Democratic Party (1991–1993)
- Susan W. Turnbull, former vice chair of the Democratic National Committee (2009–2011); former chair of the Maryland Democratic Party (2009–2011)

== Notable individuals ==
=== Businesspeople ===
- Paul Tudor Jones, hedge fund manager
- Gary Hirshberg, co-founder and former CEO of Stonyfield Farm
- Ken Harbaugh, former United States Navy veteran (1996–2005), Democratic nominee for Ohio's 7th congressional district in 2018 and nonprofit executive
- Jana McKeag, Cherokee Nation, president of Lowry Strategies

=== Activists ===
- David Mixner, civil rights activist and author

=== International politicians ===
- Sadiq Khan, current mayor of London

== Celebrities ==
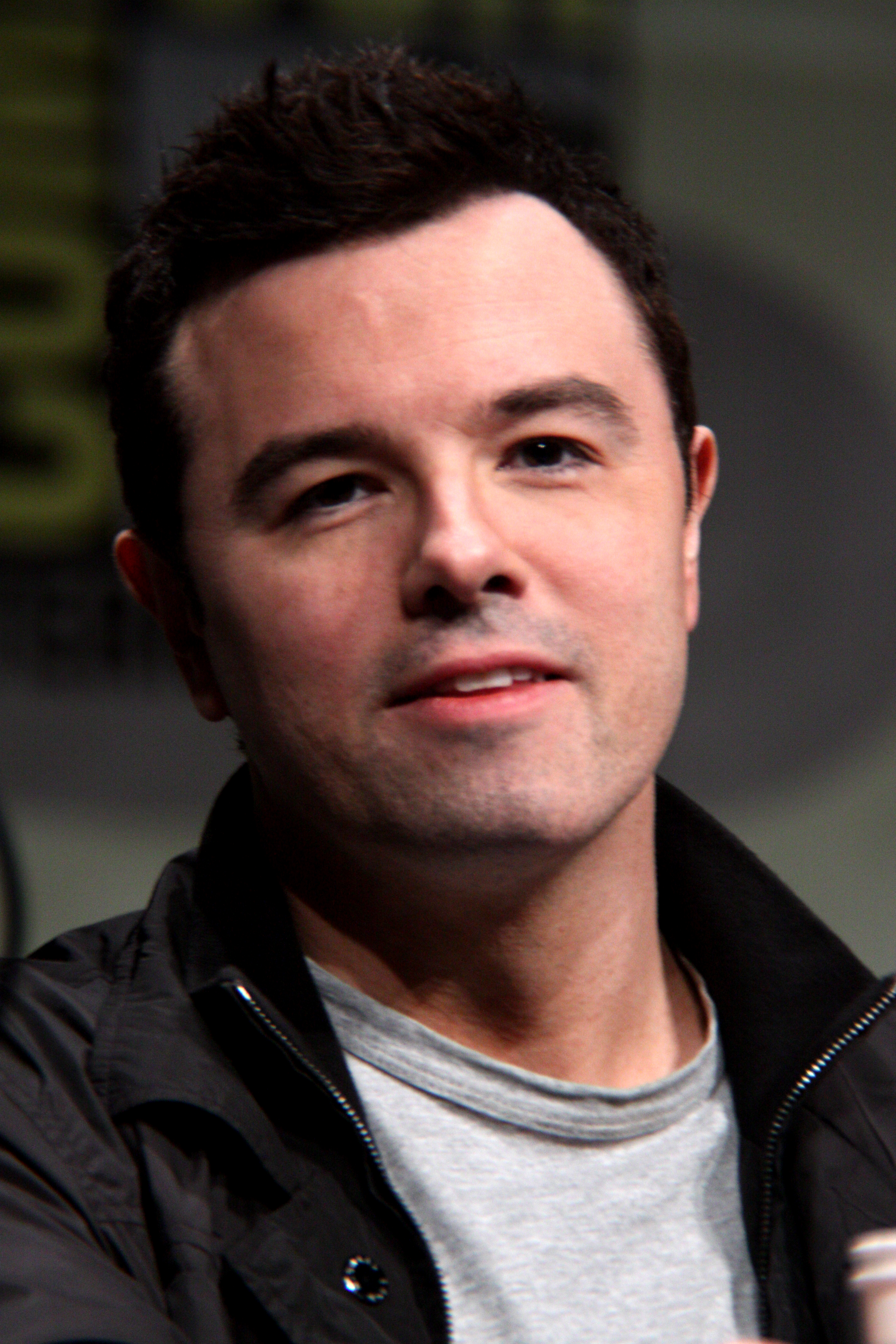
Seth MacFarlane

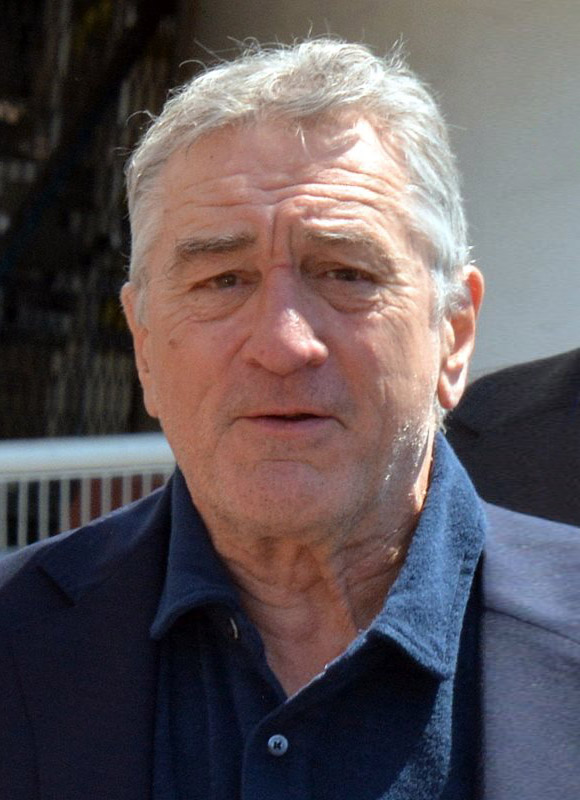
Robert De Niro

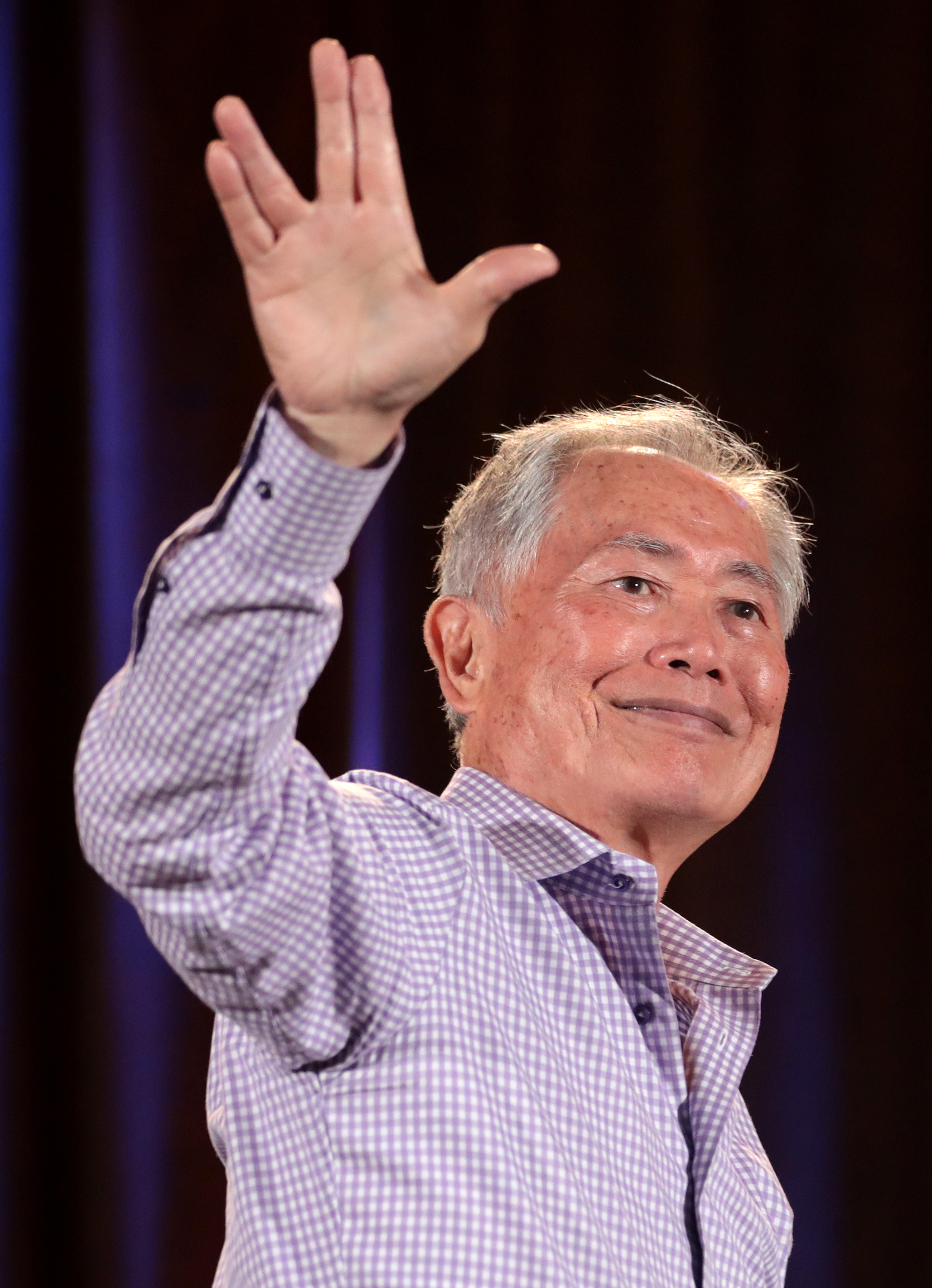
George Takei

=== Actors and artists ===
- Jennifer Aniston, actress
- Tom Colicchio, celebrity chef
- Kevin Costner, actor
- David Crosby, musician
- Alan Cumming, actor
- Lee Daniels, director
- Robert De Niro, actor
- Portia De Rossi, actress and model
- Mark Duplass, actor
- Shepard Fairey, artist
- Jenna Fischer, actress
- Michael J. Fox, actor
- Ben Harper, musician
- Jane Lynch, actress
- Seth MacFarlane, actor, animator and filmmaker
- Mandy Moore, singer-songwriter and actress
- Chloë Grace Moretz, actress
- Kevin Nash, professional wrestler and actor
- Gwyneth Paltrow, actress and businesswoman
- Sarah Jessica Parker, actress
- Pedro Pascal, actor
- Ben Platt, actor
- Rob Reiner, actor
- Ryan Reynolds, actor
- Anne Rice, author
- Emmy Rossum, actress, television director, singer-songwriter
- John Stamos, actor
- Sharon Stone, actress
- George Takei, actor and activist
- Lauren Tom, actress
- Bradley Whitford, actor

=== Athletes and sports figures ===
- Greg Louganis, diver
- Collin Martin, soccer player

=== Media personalities ===
- Ryann Richardson, Miss Black America 2018, political activist

== Organizations ==
=== Newspapers ===
The San Diego Union-Tribune

- El Paso Times
- Sentinel Colorado
- The State (newspaper)
- The San Diego Union-Tribune
- Bay Area Reporter
- Falls Church News-Press
- Orlando Sentinel

=== Political action committees ===
- Equality California
- LGBTQ Victory Fund
- VoteVets
- Garden State Equality
