= William C. Harrison =

American politician

William C. Harrison served as chairman of the North Carolina State Board of Education, which sets policy for the North Carolina Department of Public Instruction, from 2009 through 2013. He was the first person to serve as both State Board of Education Chairman and as "chief executive officer," a position created by Gov. Beverly Perdue in 2009 to consolidate authority and accountability for public schools in North Carolina. After a state superior court judge ruled that Perdue had overstepped her constitutional authority by making him CEO, Harrison stepped down from that role, while continuing to be chairman of the board.

A native of Pennsylvania, Dr. Harrison has served as Superintendent of local school systems in Cumberland County, Orange County, and Hoke County. He has also served as an Assistant Superintendent in Brunswick County Schools and as a principal and teacher. Dr. Harrison holds a bachelor's degree in Intermediate Education from Methodist College, a master's degree in Educational Administration and an Education Specialist degree in Education Administration from East Carolina University, and an Educational doctorate in Education Administration from Vanderbilt University.

Preceded by Howard Nathaniel Lee	Chairman, North Carolina State Board of Education; 2009-2013	Succeeded by Bill Cobey
