= Senator Kirk =

Senator Kirk may refer to:

== United States Senate members ==
- Mark Kirk (born 1959), U.S. Senator from Illinois from 2010 to 2017
- Paul G. Kirk (born 1938), U.S. Senator from Massachusetts from 2009 to 2010

== United States state senate members ==
- Phil Kirk, North Carolina State Senate
- Robert C. Kirk (1821–1898), Ohio State Senate
