= List of commissioners of Orange County, North Carolina =

This article contains an incomplete list of persons who have served on the Board of County Commissioners of Orange County, North Carolina. The Board of Commissioners is composed of seven members serving staggered terms of four years. Commissioners are elected by district and at-large in partisan elections. (Board membership increased from three members to five members in 1954 and from five members to seven members in 2008.)

== Current commissioners ==
- Marilyn Carter (2024- )
- Amy Fowler (2020- )
- Sally Greene (2018- )
- Jean Hamilton (2020- )
- Earl McKee (2010- )
- Phyllis Portie-Ascott (2022- )

== Former commissioners ==
- John H. Hanner (1932–1938)
- W. P. Berry (1932–1936)
- J C. Lloyd (1932–1936)
- Carl T. Durham (1936–1938)
- S. A. Nathan (1936–1938)
- Collier Cobb (1938–1952)
- J. Ed Laws (1938–1942)
- Ben Wilson (1938–1950)
- Sim Efland (1950–1956)
- Hubert G. Laws (1942–1951)
- R. O. Forrest (1951–1954)
- R. J. M. Hobbs (1952–1960)
- Henry S. Walker (1954–1974)
- Dwight M. Ray (1954–1958)
- Edwin S. Lanier (1954–1956)
- Donald Stanford (1956–1964)
- Claude T. Pope (1956–1957)
- Donald McDade (1957–1962)
- Clarence Jones (1958–1962)
- Harvey D. Bennett (1960–1972)
- Gordon Cleveland (1962–1966)
- Carl M. Smith (1962–1970)
- William C. Ray (1964–1972)
- Ira A. Ward (1966–1973)
- C. Norman Walker (1970–1986)
- Flora R. Garrett (1972–1976)
- Richard E. Whitted (1972–1984)
- Melvin Whitfield (1973–1974)
- Norman F. Gustaveson (1974–1982)
- Jan Pinney (1974–1978)
- Donald (Don) Willhoit (1976–1996)
- Anne C. Barnes (1978–1981)
- Shirley E. Marshall (1981–1990)
- Andrew B. (Ben) Lloyd, Jr. (1982–1986)
- John W. Hartwell (1986–1990)
- Verla C. Insko (1990–1994)
- William (Bill) L. Crowther (1994–1998)
- Margaret W. Brown (1996–2004)
- Stephen Halkiotis (1986–2006)
- Moses Carey, Jr. (1984–2008)
- Mike Nelson (2006-2010)
- Valerie P. Foushee (2004–2012)
- Pam Hemminger (2008–2012)
- Steve Yuhasz (2008–2012)
- Alice Gordon (1990–2014)
- Bernadette Pelissier (2008-2016)
- Barry Jacobs (1998-2018)
- Mia Burroughs (2014-2018)
- Penny Rich (2012-2020)
- Mark Marcoplos (2016-2020)
- Mark Dorosin (2012-2021)
- Renee Price (2012-2022)
- Anna Richards (2021-2024)
- Jamezetta Bedford (2018-2026)
