= Mark Kleinschmidt (politician) =

American politician

Mayor of Chapel Hill, North Carolina
- In office December 7, 2009 – December 2, 2015
- Preceded by: Kevin Foy
- Succeeded by: Pam Hemminger

Chapel Hill Town Council
- In office December 2001 – December 7, 2009

Personal details
- Born: March 25, 1970 (age 56) Scott Air Force Base, Illinois, U.S.
- Party: Democratic
- Spouse: Matt DeBellis
- Education: University of North Carolina School of Law
- Profession: Lawyer, teacher, politician

Mark J. Kleinschmidt (born March 25, 1970) is an American lawyer, teacher, and politician. He served as the Mayor of Chapel Hill, North Carolina, from 2009 until 2015.

Kleinschmidt is the first openly gay mayor in the town's history. He is also the third openly gay candidate to be elected mayor in North Carolina, following Mike Nelson of Carrboro (1995) and Elic Senter of Franklinton (2007).

== Biography ==
=== Early life and career ===
Kleinschmidt and his twin sister, Michelle, were born on March 25, on Scott Air Force Base in Belleville, Illinois, (although of Scottish and Chamorro descent) to Rebecca Hoover and David Nauta, a (now deceased) Master Sergeant, then adopted by (now retired) U.S. Air Force Chief Master Sergeant and Marge Kleinschmidt, a registered nurse. The Kleinschmidts lived in Hawaii and New Mexico, before settling in Goldsboro, North Carolina, when Mark was 10 years old.

Mark Kleinschmidt received a Bachelor of Arts in education from the University of North Carolina as part of UNC's first Teaching Fellows class in May 1992. He taught social studies at West Mecklenburg High School within the Charlotte-Mecklenburg school district. In 1997, Kleinschmidt enrolled in the University of North Carolina School of Law, where he received his J.D. degree in May 2000. In 2005, Kleinschmidt completed Harvard University's John F. Kennedy School of Government program for Senior Executives in State and Local Government as a David Bohnett LGBTQ Victory Institute Leadership Fellow.

=== Political career ===
Kleinschmidt was elected to the Chapel Hill Town Council in 2001. He served on the council for two terms from December 2001 to December 2009.

In May 2009, incumbent Chapel Hill mayor Kevin Foy announced that he would not seek re-election for a fifth term in office. Foy had served as mayor for four terms from 2001 to 2009. Kleinschmidt, a councilman since 2001, was one of four candidates to announce their candidacies to succeed Foy. In addition to Kleinschmidt, the three other candidates for the 2009 mayoral election were town councilman Matt Czajkowski, former chairman of the Orange County Republican Party Augustus Cho, and patent lawyer Kevin Wolff. Outgoing mayor Foy endorsed Kleinschmidt as his successor in October 2009, shortly before the mayoral election.

Kleinschmidt won the election on November 3, 2009, in a race described by local media as a "hard-fought but civil campaign." He narrowly defeated his closest rival, councilman Czajkowski, by just 106 votes. Mark Kleinschmidt was sworn in as Mayor of Chapel Hill on Monday, December 7, 2009.

Kleinschmidt easily won re-election to a second two-year term in 2011 with 5,442 votes (77.54 percent). Kevin Wolff placed second in while Tim Sookram came in third. Kleinschmidt won a third term unopposed on November 4, 2013, with 89.7 percent of the vote. Approximately 500 voters wrote in write-in candidates, stemming from controversies over development in Chapel Hill's Central West area. Kleinschmidt promised to continue revitalization efforts in the city's Ephesus Church – Fordham Boulevard district during his third term.

Kleinschmidt lost his bid for a fourth term on November 3, 2015 to Pam Hemminger. Hemminger received 4,651 total votes, roughly equivalent to 54 percent, to Kleinschmidt's 3,900. After hearing the results, Kleinschmidt expressed his gratitude to the town of Chapel Hill: "I’m grateful to have been mayor of the greatest town in America," Kleinschmidt said. "During my time as mayor, we were able to harness the voices of over 10,000 people who love this town. Thank you all for the greatest gift I could have received in my life in being the mayor of this town."

In February 2018, Kleinschmidt filed to compete in the Democratic primary to serve as Clerk of Court in Orange County. He defeated Jamie Stanford in the May 8th primary. In 2018, Kleinschmidt was elected as Orange County's Clerk of Superior Court, and he was re-elected in 2022.

== Electoral history ==
2009 Chapel Hill mayoral election results
Candidate	Votes	%
Mark Kleinschmidt	4,006	49.49
Matt Czajkowski	3,766	46.53
Augustus Cho	217	2.68
Kevin Wolff	94	1.16
Total votes	8,083	100

2011 Chapel Hill mayoral election results
Candidate	Votes	%
Mark Kleinschmidt	5,442	77.54
Kevin Wolff	1,243	17.71
Tim Sookram	292	4.16
Total votes	6,977	100

2013 Chapel Hill mayoral election results
Candidate	Votes	%
Mark Kleinschmidt	4,189	89.60
Write-in, E. Thomas Henkel	244	5.22
Write-in, Matt Czakowski	40	0.86
Write-in, Nancy Oates	5	0.11
Write-in, other	197	4.21
Total votes	4,675	100

2015 Chapel Hill mayoral election results
Candidate	Votes	%
Pam Hemminger	4,878	54.01
Mark Kleinschmidt	4,053	44.88
Gary Kahn	84	0.93
Write-in	16	0.17
Total votes	9,031	100

== See also ==
- List of mayors of Chapel Hill, North Carolina
