= Jessica Anderson (mayor) =

Mayor of Chapel Hill, North Carolina, since 2023

Jess Anderson
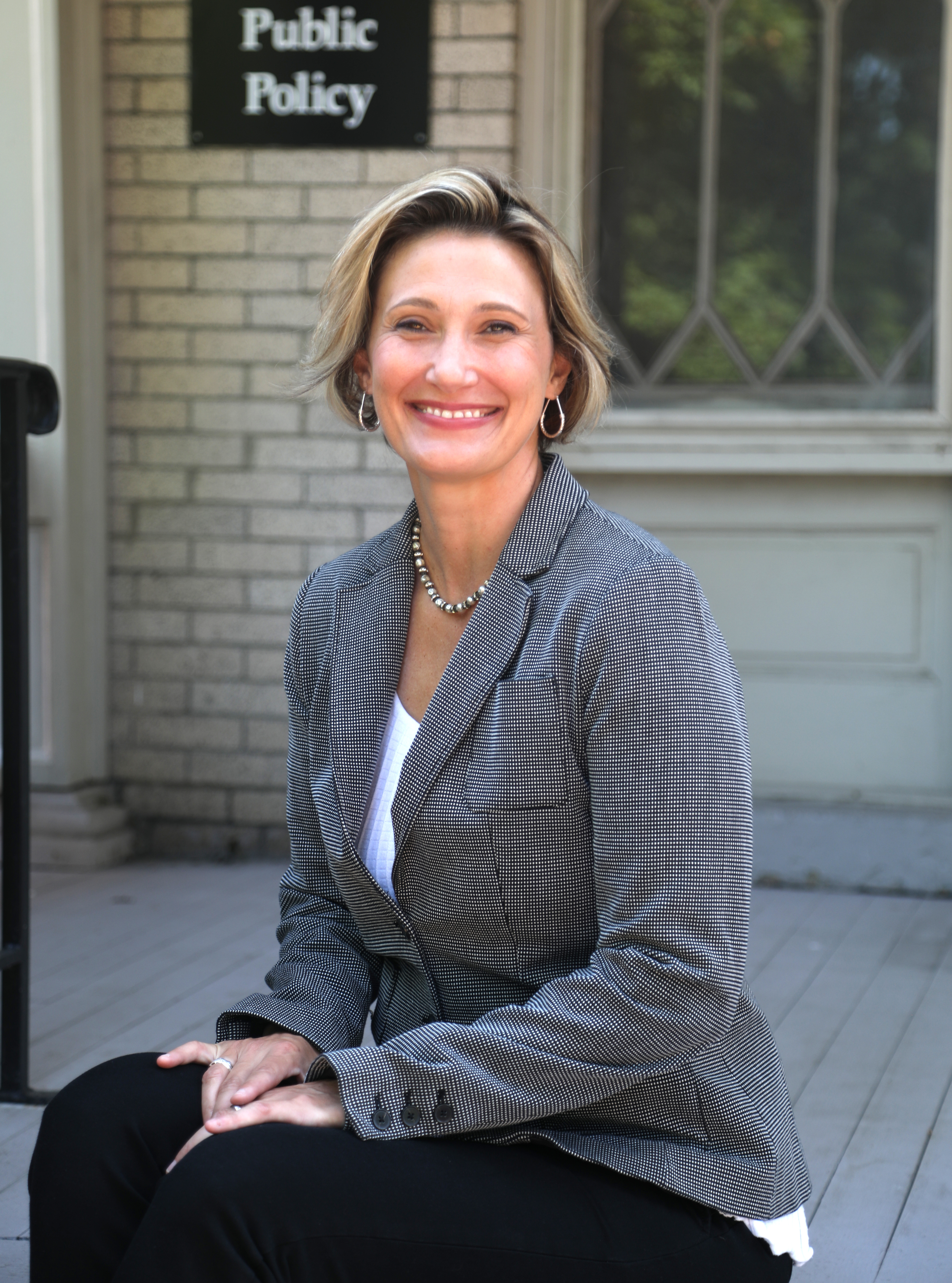
- Anderson in 2023

Mayor of Chapel Hill
- Incumbent
- Assumed office December 18, 2023
- Preceded by: Pam Hemminger

Member of the Chapel Hill Town Council
- In office December 2, 2015 – December 18, 2023

Personal details
- Born: Jessica Cooper Anderson; 1978 (age 47–48)
- Party: Democratic
- Spouse: Karthik Shyam
- Children: 2
- Education: Northeastern University (BA); Duke University (MPP)
- Occupation: Policy analyst; politician
- Website: jessformayor.org

Jessica Cooper Anderson (born 1978) is an American public policy analyst serving as the mayor of Chapel Hill, North Carolina, since December 18, 2023. She previously served on the Chapel Hill Town Council for eight years and has worked in the public policy department at the University of North Carolina at Chapel Hill since 2022. She is a member of the Democratic Party.

== Education and professional career ==
Anderson received her bachelor's degree in journalism at Northeastern University and earned her Master of Public Policy in social policy from the Sanford School of Public Policy at Duke University. She moved to Chapel Hill around 2010. She used to be a senior policy analyst at the SERVE Center at the University of North Carolina at Greensboro, assessing school districts in North Carolina and advising communities nationally on efforts to combat youth homelessness. She became a professor of the practice in the public policy department of the University of North Carolina at Chapel Hill in 2022.

== Political career ==
Anderson served two four-year terms on the Chapel Hill Town Council from 2015 to 2023. In her first election in 2015, she was endorsed by the new political action committee Chapel Hill Alliance for a Livable Town (CHALT) and received the most votes of any council candidate. She served as mayor pro tempore from 2017 to 2019 and was reelected to the council in 2019, again as the top vote getter. She led the town to hire its first urban designer and adopt a "Complete Community" framework, proposed by urban planner Jennifer Keesmaat, meant to promote sustainable development and affordable housing.

Anderson announced her mayoral candidacy in July 2023. She was endorsed by outgoing mayor Pam Hemminger, most of the incumbent town council, the Sierra Club, Indy Week, and the local advocacy group NEXT. As in past years, this election cycle—the most expensive in town history—was marked by disagreement over the direction of development. Opponent Adam Searing, a fellow council member, ran alongside a slate of council candidates opposed to the Complete Community strategy. Anderson won the November election with 7,092 votes (59%) to 4,943 (41%), and candidates aligned with her won three of the four open council seats.

Anderson was sworn in as mayor on December 18, 2023.

Anderson announced her second mayoral candidacy running as an incumbent in May 2025. She is stated to have focused her second run on reducing property taxes on families, seniors and renters. Jess Anderson won reelection as Chapel Hill mayor with 5,714 votes (95.06%). However, she ran unopposed, meaning there was no opposing mayoral candidate.

== Personal life ==
Anderson is married to Karthik Shyam, a communications strategist, and has two children, Elena and Nico. Along with their dog Ollie. Anderson lives in the Coker Hills area of Chapel Hill.

== Electoral history ==
2015 Chapel Hill town council election results
Candidate	Votes	%
Jessica Anderson	5,318	16.98
Donna Bell (incumbent)	4,485	14.32
Nancy Oates	4,449	14.20
Michael Parker	4,186	13.37
Jim Ward (incumbent)	4,063	12.97
David Schwartz	3,890	12.42
Lee Storrow (incumbent)	3,147	10.04
Adam W. Jones	906	2.89
Paul Neebe	771	2.46
Total votes	—	100

2019 Chapel Hill town council election results
Candidate	Votes	%
Jessica Anderson (incumbent)	5,434	18.22
Amy Ryan	4,407	14.77
Michael Parker (incumbent)	4,259	14.28
Tai Huynh	3,946	13.23
Nancy Oates (incumbent)	3,922	13.15
Sue Hunter	3,909	13.10
Renuka Soll	3,861	12.94
Total votes	—	100

2023 Chapel Hill mayoral election results
Candidate	Votes	%
Jessica Anderson	7,092	58.79
Adam Searing	4,943	40.97
Write-in	29	0.24
Total votes	12,064	100
