= North Carolina State Board of Education =

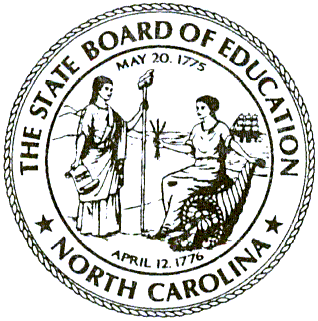
Seal of the North Carolina State Board of Education

The North Carolina State Board of Education, established by Article 9 of the Constitution of North Carolina, supervises and administers the public school systems of North Carolina. The board sets policy and general procedures for public school systems across the state, including teacher pay and qualifications, course content, testing requirements, and manages state education funds.

The North Carolina State Board of Education consists of the Lieutenant Governor, State Treasurer, and 11 members appointed by the Governor and confirmed by the General Assembly for eight-year terms (three at-large, eight from designated educational districts across the state). The North Carolina Superintendent of Public Instruction serves as the board's secretary. In 2009, Gov. Beverly Perdue asked the board "to redefine the duties of its chair to include the responsibilities of the newly created Chief Executive Officer, who will manage operations of the public school system." Superintendent June Atkinson sued the governor and the judge ruled that the superintendent had the constitutional authority to run the system.

== History ==
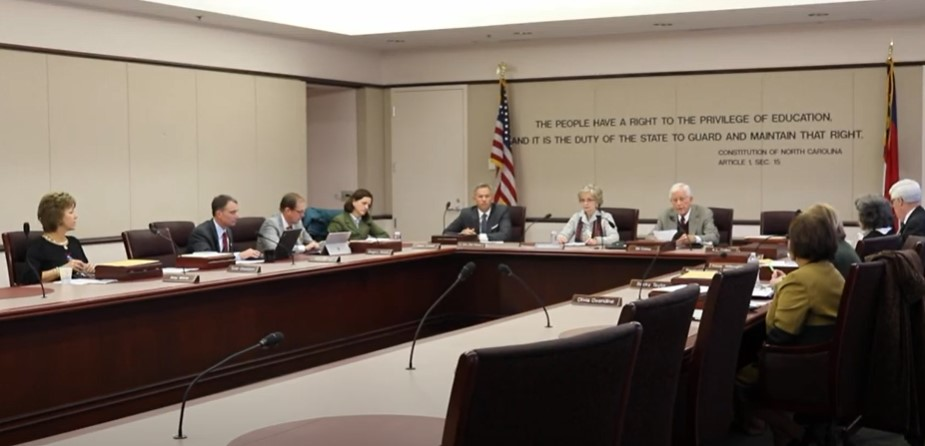
Meeting of the board in December 2016

In 1868 North Carolina ratified a constitution which provided for a system of public schools to be led by a Superintendent of Public Instruction and a State Board of Education. Under this framework, the board comprised the governor, lieutenant governor, secretary of state, state treasurer, state auditor, superintendent of public works (an office eliminated in 1873), attorney general, and the superintendent of public instruction. It was tasked by the constitution to "make all needful rules and regulations in relation to Free Public Schools and the Educational Fund of the State." In 1901 the legislature created an equalizing fund to subsidize education expenses in counties with fewer resources. The board was responsible for the fund until the duty of administering it was transferred to a new commission in 1927.

In 1943 the North Carolina General Assembly amended the constitution to modify the board's membership to comprise the governor, lieutenant governor, state treasurer, superintendent, and a delegate from each of the state's congressional districts. From 1943 to 1954, by informal arrangement, the lieutenant governor served as the board's chairman. The new constitution of 1971 established that the board was to "supervise and administer a free public school system and the educational funds provided for its support [...] and shall make all needed rules and regulations in relation, thereto". The document further revised the board's membership to consist of the lieutenant governor, state treasurer, and 11 gubernatorial appointees (one from each of the state's eight education districts and three others). The superintendent was removed from the board and made its chief administrator and secretary.

== Members ==
=== Current members ===
Below is a table of the current board members.

Member	District or Office	Serving since	Term expires	First appointed by
Eric C. Davis, chairman	At-Large	2015	March 31, 2029	Pat McCrory
Alan Duncan, vice chair	Piedmont Triad (5th)	2018	March 31, 2029	Roy Cooper
Jill Camnitz	Northeast (1st)	2018	March 31, 2027	Roy Cooper
Reginald Kenan	Southeast (2nd)	2009	March 31, 2033	Bev Perdue
Amy White	North Central (3rd)	2016	March 31, 2031	Pat McCrory
Dr. Olivia Holmes Oxendine	Sandhills (4th)	2013	March 31, 2029	Pat McCrory
James E. Ford	Southwest (6th)	2018	March 31, 2027	Roy Cooper
John Blackburn	Northwest (7th)	2022	March 31, 2031	Roy Cooper
Dr. Janet Harmon Mason	Western (8th)	2025	March 31, 2033	Josh Stein
J. Wendell Hall	At-Large	2019	March 31, 2033	Roy Cooper
Catty Moore	At-Large	2024	N/A	Roy Cooper
Rachel Hunt, ex officio	Lieutenant Governor	2025	December 31, 2028	elected
Brad Briner, ex officio	State Treasurer	2025	December 31, 2028	elected

==== The Secretary to the State Board ====
Mo Green (Superintendent of Public Instruction since 2025)

=== Notable former members ===
- Bill Cobey (2013–2018)
- Phil Kirk (1997–2003)
- Howard Nathaniel Lee (2003-2009)
- Dennis A. Wicker
- Patricia Willoughby (2001-2019)

== See also ==
- North Carolina State Board of Education Teaching Certification

== Works cited ==
- Adams, Steve; Bostic, Richard (November 1982). "The Lieutenant Governor – A Legislative or Executive Office?" (PDF). N.C. Insight. N.C. Center for Public Policy Research. pp. 2–10.
- Baxter, Andy (September 1990). "A Short Constitutional History of Public School Governance in North Carolina, 1776-1990" (PDF). N.C. Insight. N.C. Center for Public Policy Research. pp. 13–14.
