= Howard Nathaniel Lee =

American politician from North Carolina (born 1934)

Howard Lee
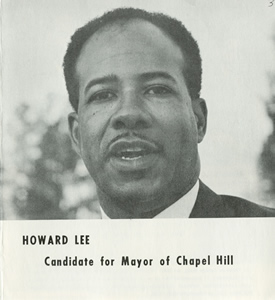
- Lee in a pamphlet published during his 1969 mayoral campaign

Chair of the North Carolina State Board of Education
- In office 2003–2009
- Governor: Mike Easley; Bev Perdue
- Preceded by: Phil Kirk
- Succeeded by: William C. Harrison

Member of the North Carolina Senate from the 16th district
- In office January 1, 1997 – January 1, 2003 Serving with Eleanor Kinnaird
- Preceded by: Fred M. Hobbs; Teena Smith Little
- Succeeded by: Eleanor Kinnaird (Redistricting)
- In office January 1, 1991 – January 1, 1995 Serving with Russell Grady Walker
- Preceded by: Wanda Holder Hunt
- Succeeded by: Fred M. Hobbs

Secretary of the North Carolina Department of Environmental and Natural Resources
- In office January 10, 1977 – July 31, 1981
- Governor: Jim Hunt
- Preceded by: George Little
- Succeeded by: Joseph W. Grimsley

28th Mayor of Chapel Hill
- In office 1969–1975
- Preceded by: Sandy McClamroch
- Succeeded by: James Wallace

Personal details
- Born: Howard Nathaniel Lee; July 28, 1934 (age 92) Lithonia, Georgia, U.S.
- Party: Democratic
- Spouse: Lillian Wesley (m. 1962)
- Education: Fort Valley State College

Military service
- Allegiance: United States
- Branch/service: United States Army
- Years of service: 1959–1961

Howard Nathaniel Lee (born July 28, 1934) is an American politician who served as Mayor of Chapel Hill, North Carolina, from 1969 to 1975. He was the first African-American mayor elected in Chapel Hill, and the first African American to be elected mayor of any majority-white city in the South. Later serving as North Carolina Secretary of Environmental and Natural Resources, Lee would also become the first African American to hold a state cabinet post in North Carolina.

== Early life and education ==
Howard Nathaniel Lee was born to Howard Lee and Lou Temple on July 28, 1934, on a sharecropper's farm outside Lithonia, Georgia. Lee graduated from Bruce Street High School in 1953, and began his freshman year at Clark College, a historically black college of Atlanta that fall. Lee transferred to Fort Valley State College in 1956 and graduated in 1959, the first member of his family to receive a college diploma.

Lee was drafted into the U.S. Army during the summer of 1959 and completed basic training at Fort Benning, Georgia. Lee received medical corpsman training at Fort Sam Houston, Texas, before being stationed at Fort Hood. While at Fort Hood, Lee organized two sit-ins in the town of Killeen to protest segregated public facilities. The second sit-in was reported back to Fort Hood, and Lee was stationed in Korea the next week. Lee served as an ambulance driver and assistant company clerk at Camp Casey until his honorable discharge in 1961.

Lee moved to Savannah, Georgia, where he served as a juvenile probation officer, and married Lillian Wesley in 1962. They moved to North Carolina in 1964, where he did graduate study, earning a master's degree in social work from the University of North Carolina at Chapel Hill. In 1965, he joined the faculties of Duke University and North Carolina Central University.

== Political career ==
After encountering racial tension in his predominantly white Chapel Hill neighborhood, Lee decided to enter local politics. In February 1969, Lee announced his mayoral candidacy. The ensuing election saw a record 4,734 votes cast. On May 6, 1969, Lee was elected mayor of Chapel Hill. He was the first African American to be elected as mayor in a majority-white city, and the first to be elected to such a position in the South since Reconstruction. He won by a narrow margin but was re-elected twice, earning increasing percentages of the vote: 64 percent in 1971 and 89 percent in 1973.

In 1976, Lee sought the Democratic Party nomination for Lieutenant Governor of North Carolina. He narrowly finished first in the initial primary but was defeated in the primary runoff by James C. Green. In 1977, Governor Jim Hunt appointed Lee as the Secretary of the North Carolina Department of Natural Resources and Community Development, a post which he held until 1981.

Lee returned to electoral politics in 1990 when he was elected to the North Carolina Senate. He served from 1990 to 1994, and again from 1996 to 2002. While in the Senate, he concentrated particularly on issues affecting public education.

On May 1, 2003, the North Carolina State Board of Education elected Lee as its chairman, succeeding Phil Kirk. In 2009, Gov. Beverly Perdue appointed Lee as the new executive director of the North Carolina Education Cabinet, composed of leaders of public schools, community colleges, and public and private universities. This meant Lee had to give up his seat on the Board of Education.

Lee also served as a member of the North Carolina Utilities Commission, having been appointed by Governor Mike Easley on April 1, 2005.

In 2009, Howard and Lillian Lee were nominated as "Town Treasures" by the Chapel Hill Historical Society

== Non-profit work ==
During his retirement, Lee founded the Howard N. Lee Institute, which "focuses on erasing the achievement gap and improving academic performance for minority males."

== See also ==
- List of first African-American mayors
- List of mayors of Chapel Hill, North Carolina

Political offices
Preceded by Sandy McClamroch	Mayor of Chapel Hill; 1969–1975	Succeeded by James Wallace
Preceded by George Little	Secretary of the North Carolina Department of Environmental and Natural Resources; 1977–1981	Succeeded by Joseph W. Grimsley
North Carolina Senate
Preceded by Wanda Holder Hunt	Member of the North Carolina Senate from the 16th district 1991–1995; Served alongside: Russell Grady Walker	Succeeded by Fred M. Hobbs; Teena Smith Little
Preceded by Fred M. Hobbs; Teena Smith Little	Member of the North Carolina Senate from the 16th district 1997–2003; Served alongside: Eleanor Kinnaird	Succeeded by Eric Miller Reeves
Political offices
Preceded by Phil Kirk	Chair of the North Carolina State Board of Education; 2003–2009	Succeeded by William C. Harrison
