= Pam Hemminger =

Mayor of Chapel Hill, North Carolina, from 2015 to 2023

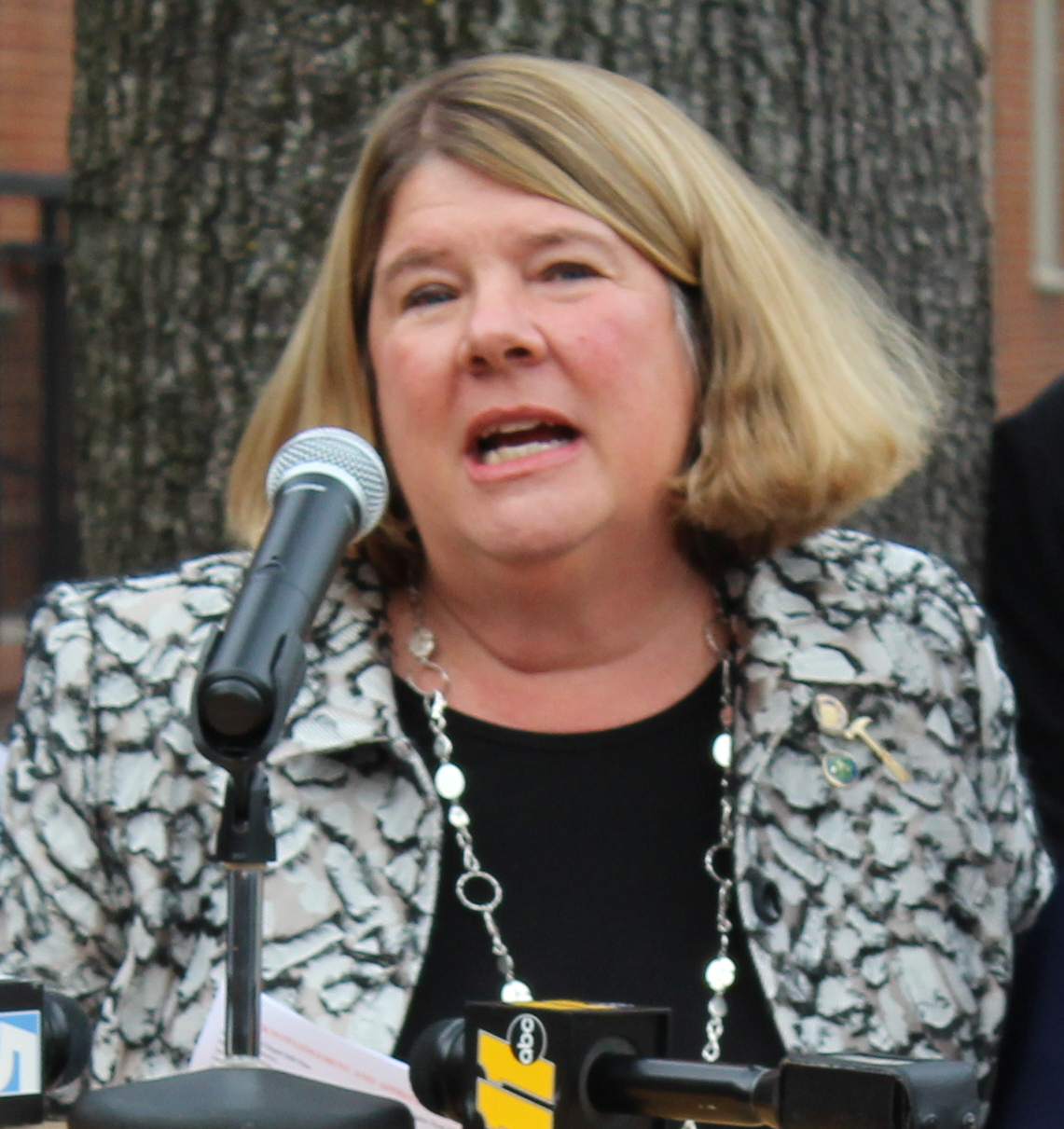
- Hemminger in 2019

Mayor of Chapel Hill
- In office December 2, 2015 – December 18, 2023
- Preceded by: Mark Kleinschmidt
- Succeeded by: Jessica Anderson

Orange County Commissioner
- In office 2008–2012

Chapel Hill-Carrboro City Schools Board of Education
- In office 2004–2008

Personal details
- Born: March 20, 1960 (age 66)
- Party: Democratic
- Spouse: Bradley Hemminger
- Children: 4
- Education: Vanderbilt University (BA)
- Occupation: Politician; business owner

Pamela Somers Hemminger (born March 20, 1960) is an American politician who served as the mayor of Chapel Hill, North Carolina, from 2015 to 2023. She owns a small real-estate company and previously served on the Chapel Hill-Carrboro City Schools board of education and the Orange County Board of County Commissioners. She is a member of the Democratic Party.

In the town's 2015 mayoral race, Hemminger was endorsed by a new local political action committee and unseated Mark Kleinschmidt by a 9% margin. She won reelection three times, in 2017, 2019, and 2021.

== Education and personal life ==
Hemminger graduated from Vanderbilt University in 1982 with a bachelor's degree in economics and German. Her husband, Bradley Mark Hemminger, is an associate professor at the University of North Carolina at Chapel Hill (UNC) School of Information and Library Science. They met at Vanderbilt and have four children, all of whom attended Chapel Hill-Carrboro City Schools and three of whom graduated from UNC. In 2004, Indy Week wrote: "You could call Pam Hemminger a power soccer mom", noting a decade of involvement with a local soccer league.

== Early political career (2004–2015) ==
In 2004, Hemminger unsuccessfully ran in the Democratic Party primary election for the Orange County Board of County Commissioners; after the election, in July, she said the campaign "was a really positive experience". The defining issue of the campaign was the possibility of merging Chapel Hill-Carrboro City Schools and Orange County Schools; the group NoMerger.org, seeking to oust incumbent Moses Carey, endorsed Hemminger and Valerie Foushee; it did not endorse incumbent Margaret Brown, for perceived unwillingness to pick a side. With 21% of the vote, Hemminger placed fourth of five candidates; the nominees were Foushee and Carey.

Hemminger was a member, from 2004 to 2008, of the Chapel Hill-Carrboro Board of Education, on which she served as both vice chair and chair. Elected along with Foushee in 2008, Hemminger served as an Orange County Commissioner until 2012. She also served in Chapel Hill's Greenways Commission, the town's Parks and Recreation Commission, and the Upper Neuse River Basin Authority, chairing the latter two.

At the time of her first election as mayor, in 2015, Hemminger had lived in Chapel Hill for 29 years. She was owner of Windaco Properties LLC, a real-estate management company. In 2018, Lauren Talley of The Daily Tar Heel reported that Hemminger's company managed five properties: "She does the bookkeeping – mainly on evenings and weekends – while another employee maintains the properties."

== Mayor of Chapel Hill (2015–2023) ==
=== Elections ===
With 54% of the vote, Hemminger won the 2015 mayoral election in Chapel Hill against incumbent Mayor Mark Kleinschmidt (45%) and Southern Village resident Gary Kahn (0.9%). Marked by debate over the future of development in the area, this was the first election in five decades in which an incumbent mayor in Chapel Hill was defeated. Hemminger raised $24,974 before the early voting period, while Kleinschmidt had raised $30,480. In late September, a Public Policy Polling survey found Kleinschmidt leading by 12 percentage points, but by early November, Hemminger led by 6 points.

In 2015, only one council member (of the four up for reelection) was reelected. The Chapel Hill Alliance for a Livable Town (CHALT) political action committee, which endorsed Hemminger, also supported two of the three new candidates who won election to the town council. CHALT, established in 2015, advocated a "more deliberate pace of growth" along with affordable housing, environmental protection, and energy efficiency. A former town council member said of the organization, "I think basically they advocate for slower or no growth ... They would argue that they're not against growth, they just want a different kind of growth." Indy Week reporter Billy Ball wrote: "This campaign has been unusually venomous by Chapel Hill standards, with malicious attacks, Internet trolling and a bitter wave of anti-incumbent sentiment, all in a town that, historically, tends to agree with itself more than it doesn't." During the campaign, as CHALT members criticized certain developments in town and certain people in government, Hemminger distanced herself from the group, saying, "I'm not for polarization."

Hemminger confirmed her first reelection bid during her weekly appearance on WCHL's The Aaron Keck Show in May 2017, and then she made a formal announcement in June. She was reelected to a second term on November 7, 2017, with 92.51% of the vote; former Chapel Hill-Carrboro NAACP leader Eugene Farrar challenged her in a write-in campaign. Hemminger focused on increasing and diversifying the tax base to fund affordable housing, community space for teenagers, parks and recreation, and additional cultural activities. As she later explained, "The longer view is changing and diversifying commercial space. We can't keep depending on residential property taxes and business property taxes to keep us going." She was endorsed by Indy Week, CHALT, Equality North Carolina, and the Sierra Club. Four new council members were elected, all endorsed by CHALT.

On July 8, 2019, Hemminger filed for reelection, seeking a third term as mayor. Facing a single challenger, 34-year-old ACLU canvasser and yoga and math teacher Joshua Levenson, she was again endorsed by CHALT, the Sierra Club, Equality North Carolina, and Indy Week, as well as The Daily Tar Heel and the local advocacy group NEXT. She won the election with 89% of the vote.

Hemminger was again re-elected with 61% of the vote in 2021 in a more hotly contested race against town council member Hongbin Gu and UNC law student Zachary Boyce. Hemminger was again endorsed by a number of organizations and media outlets, including Indy Week, the Sierra Club, NEXT Chapel Hill-Carrboro, Equality NC, The News & Observer, and The Daily Tar Heel; meanwhile local advocacy group CHALT endorsed Gu against the incumbent Hemminger, whom they had endorsed in prior election cycles.

=== Tenure ===
Hemminger was sworn in as mayor of Chapel Hill on December 2, 2015. She announced in July 2023 that she would not stand for a fourth reelection. She endorsed town council member Jessica Anderson, who won the 2023 election.

==== Development ====
In April 2017, the town council rezoned parts of Chapel Hill to attract business development; Hemminger said she wanted the change because "we're not able to react fast enough for some of these projects that we would most likely like to have". In December 2017, the town council voted to allow "conditional zoning" so that the council, in Hemminger's words, would "have more latitude for turning [development projects] down just because [council members] don't like it, or for asking for more conditions".

Saying she wanted the town to be a "regional foodie destination", Hemminger worked to bring new retailers to Chapel Hill, such as by approving construction of a Wegmans supermarket with $4 million in tax incentives. The town council also gave $2 million in tax incentives to a Charlotte development company to make new office buildings; Hemminger said the incentives were an unfortunate necessity, explaining, "We haven't had any office buildings; nothing else we tried has worked. In order to move forward, this is what the developer said it would take to be able to get them out of the ground, because it is very risky and speculative when you're building office in our community."

Hemminger supported the eventually scrapped Durham–Orange Light Rail Transit project, arguing that it would help with growth in town. She has called one instance of clearcutting "heartbreaking" and said that she preferred selection cutting. In 2017, the town bought a 36.2-acre (14.6 ha) property from the American Legion, which Hemminger said would eventually become a park, though the organization was leasing it from the town while the town paid off the $7.9-million property over three installments.

In December 2022, the town council approved a "Complete Communities Framework" proposed by urban planner Jennifer Keesmaat.

==== Energy ====
In a candidate questionnaire in 2015, Hemminger wrote: "I vow to continue Chapel Hill's strong track record of protecting our streams, encouraging energy-efficient building, and maintaining natural green spaces to balance the growing density of our built environment." In June 2017, the town council passed a resolution recommitting Chapel Hill to its goals for climate change mitigation as part of the Paris Agreement. Hemminger also signed a petition pledging to uphold the agreement after President Donald Trump announced the country's withdrawal from it. In January 2018, she signed a petition against the repeal of the Clean Power Plan announced by Scott Pruitt, the EPA administrator at the time. "To ignore climate change is ridiculous," she wrote. "To repeal things or go backwards makes no sense."

Later in 2018, David Boraks reported for WFAE that despite the announced national withdrawal from the Paris Agreement, some state and local governments had made their own efforts on climate change mitigation. Chapel Hill was among those governments; Hemminger said that "there's a great possibility of being successful no matter what the federal government's dictating". She said the town was reducing energy use, buying electric buses, building charging stations, installing LED lights in public buildings, and planting trees. She also said Duke Energy could do more to save energy.

The town council approved a Climate Action and Response Plan in April 2021.

==== Housing ====
In April 2017, Hemminger said the town had hired more staff to look into affordable housing. She said the town, in 2017, spent $6 million on affordable housing, and had set a goal of adding 400 units and renovating existing units in the coming four years. She also said she didn't want "any more [UNC] student housing downtown". In 2018, she said, "We really, really want to find ways to keep affordable housing in our communities and to create more affordable housing that doesn't come under constant pressure of this nature," referring in particular to a proposed redevelopment of a mobile home property, over which she said the town had no control. Also that year, the town council approved a $10 million bond for affordable housing, which voters approved. The next year, the council updated the town's public housing plan, calling for several kinds of renovations in all 336 of the town's public units (at the time housing 2 percent of the town's population). Hemminger also said "it's time to do something" regarding the construction of new public housing.

The town's first Affordable Housing Strategy was approved in September 2023.

==== Immigration ====
While Chapel Hill is not a sanctuary city, Hemminger argued in February 2017 that "we just have a community value that says, 'Yes, we're open for everyone'." Later that year, Hemminger claimed that the General Assembly might try to legislate for "intent" instead of "policies" in order to force municipalities to comply with federal law enforcement, saying, "It's hard to talk about [welcoming refugees] and not have state lawmakers come at us." In September, she spoke and signed a letter in support of the Deferred Action for Childhood Arrivals (DACA) program. In 2018, Chapel Hill started an initiative trying to get foreign-born residents more involved in local government. In April 2019, along with Lydia Lavelle, the mayor of neighboring Carrboro, Hemminger signed a letter opposing a bill (eventually vetoed by Governor Roy Cooper) that would have required county law enforcement to cooperate with U.S. Immigration and Customs Enforcement (ICE).

==== Silent Sam ====
In August 2017, Hemminger wrote to Carol Folt, UNC chancellor at the time, to ask for the Silent Sam statue on campus to be put into storage because it presented a "clear and present danger" to students if something happened during a protest. Shortly after the Charlottesville rally in August, she said the town was working with the university to protect students during protests. The next year, she said, "The statue belongs somewhere it can be referenced, used as a teaching tool and thought of in the correct context." On August 20, 2018, protesters toppled Silent Sam. Hemminger said town staff and police were working with the university to investigate the toppling, and added, "I encourage everyone to remember that our freedom of expression does not come at the expense of safety and public order." She also said the statue "doesn't represent our town values" and was "a public safety nightmare, as far as we're concerned", arguing that some people stayed away from downtown businesses when protests were held. She thanked police for their response to the toppling and said she wished UNC had gotten the statue removed earlier. The next year, as Folt stepped down, Hemminger said, "Our biggest concern has been that someone was going to get hurt."

==== Other issues ====
Hemminger developed the Food for the Summer program, based on an election promise; since 2016 and through 2019, it has served meals to food-insecure children throughout the summer, five days a week. Because "she helped create" Food for the Summer, Hemminger was recognized by WCHL as its weekly Hometown Hero on June 17, 2019.

In March 2016, the town council passed a resolution condemning the Public Facilities Privacy & Security Act (widely known as HB2). The next year, Hemminger said that the compromise bill partially repealing it "does not go far enough to address discrimination".

In 2017, Hemminger created the Historic Civil Rights Commemorations Task Force, which researched and recommended ways to commemorate the town's involvement in the civil rights movement, in particular the history of Chapel Hill Nine. The Task Force proposed the construction of a monument to honor the Chapel Hill Nine, which was approved for construction in 2019. The monument was dedicated on February 28, 2020, the 60th anniversary of the sit-in, with a ceremony including the four surviving members of the Nine. When the project finished, Hemminger said, "We finally get to tell our whole story, and that's just a wonderful gift this task force has put together for the entire community."

Hemminger endorsed Hillary Clinton, the Democratic nominee, in the 2016 presidential election. Hemminger has said she supports gun control measures such as stricter background checks and extended waiting periods. At a rally against gun violence on UNC's campus in 2018, she said, "The mayors across the nation are with you." Hemminger also supports limits on campaign donations in local municipal races; in her first mayoral election in Chapel Hill, the cap was $353 for individuals.

In April 2016, Chapel Hill hosted a delegation from the Israeli Knesset. Some community members criticized the visit, and one council member walked out of a meeting with the Israelis. Hemminger defended the decision to host the group, saying, "While you may not agree with everything – or any or part – it's always a good learning experience, and it's also a better opportunity to have change come when you bring people to the table and have the discussion rather than shutting them out." In June 2018, the town hosted officials of the Dutch embassy, who were visiting every "Orange County" in the United States; Hemminger said that in a meeting with the Dutch she discussed, among other things, "being a 'blue bubble in a red sea'."

== Electoral history ==
2004 Orange County Commissioner Democratic primary election results
Candidate	Votes	%
Valerie Foushee	6,933	25.2
Moses Carey Jr. (incumbent)	6,664	24.5
Margaret W. Brown (incumbent)	6,310	23.3
Pam Hemminger	5,881	21.3
Jack Lamb	1,507	5.6
Total votes	—	100

2008 Orange County Commissioner general election results, District 1
Candidate	Votes	%
Valerie Foushee (incumbent)	50,556	53.38
Pam Hemminger	44,155	46.62
Total votes	94,711	100

2015 Chapel Hill mayoral election results
Candidate	Votes	%
Pam Hemminger	4,878	54.01
Mark Kleinschmidt (incumbent)	4,053	44.88
Gary Kahn	84	0.93
Write-in	16	0.18
Total votes	9,031	100

2017 Chapel Hill mayoral election results
Candidate	Votes	%
Pam Hemminger (incumbent)	7,426	92.51
Write-in	601	7.49
Total votes	8,027	100

2019 Chapel Hill mayoral election results
Candidate	Votes	%
Pam Hemminger (incumbent)	7,064	88.54
Joshua Levenson	832	10.43
Write-in	82	1.03
Total votes	7,978	100

2021 Chapel Hill mayoral election results
Candidate	Votes	%
Pam Hemminger (incumbent)	6,256	61.16
Hongbin Gu	3,692	36.09
Zachary R. Boyce	255	2.49
Write-in	26	0.25
Total votes	10,229	100

== See also ==
- List of mayors of Chapel Hill, North Carolina
- List of commissioners of Orange County, North Carolina
