= Lydia Lavelle =

US politician and professor of law

Mayor of Carrboro
- In office December 3, 2013 – 2021
- Preceded by: Mark Chilton
- Succeeded by: Damon Seils

Carrboro Alderman
- In office 2007–2013

Personal details
- Born: Athens, Ohio, U.S.
- Education: St. Andrews University, North Carolina State University, North Carolina Central University
- Occupation: Law professor

Lydia E. Lavelle is an American academic and politician. She was the mayor of Carrboro, North Carolina, from 2013 to 2021, and is a professor of law at North Carolina Central University. She was first elected mayor in 2013, after serving on the Board of Aldermen of Carrboro for six years from 2007 to 2013. When she was elected, she became the first openly-lesbian mayor in North Carolina. She served on the board of the North Carolina Metropolitan Mayors Coalition and on the North Carolina Commission on Inclusion, to which she was appointed in 2018. As a law professor, she has researched the effects of anti-discrimination laws on LGBT people.

In 2014, she and her wife, Alicia Stemper, were the first gay couple to receive a marriage certificate in Orange County, North Carolina, after having two previous ceremonies of union prior to the legalization of gay marriage in North Carolina. In 2015, after receiving their marriage certificate, they held a public celebration of their marriage.

== Background ==
Lavelle was born in Athens, Ohio, and earned her bachelor's degree from St. Andrews University followed by a master's in parks and recreation administration from North Carolina State University. She worked in parks administration for several years, before earning her J.D. from North Carolina Central University in 1993. She then clerked for Clifton E. Johnson, North Carolina Court of Appeals judge from 1993 to 1995, and spent several years in private practice with Kevin Foy, who was mayor of Chapel Hill from 2001 to 2009.

== Positions ==
As a result of her research and her identity, she has led Carrboro in promoting policies inclusive of LGBT people and others. In response to the passage of House Bill 2 by the North Carolina General Assembly in 2016, the Carrboro Board of Alderman passed resolutions condemning the actions of the state legislature and Governor Pat McCrory. After the passage of the resolutions, she prepared a model resolution for other municipalities to use in condemning the bill. She has opposed raids by Immigrations and Customs Enforcement, alongside her counterpart in neighboring Chapel Hill, Pam Hemminger. She has also expressed an interest in continuing the development of public transportation in the region.

== Electoral history ==
Carrboro Board of Aldermen Election, 2011
Candidate	Votes	%
Michelle Johnson	2,196	29.89
Lydia Ellen Lavelle	2,191	29.82
Dan Coleman	1,907	25.95
Braxton Foushee	987	13.43
Write-In (Miscellaneous)	69	0.91

Carrboro Mayor Election, 2013
Candidate	Votes	%
Lydia E. Lavelle	1,838	96.18
Write-In (Miscellaneous)	63	3.30
Mark Chilton (Write-In)	5	0.26
Brian Voyce (Write-In)	5	0.26

Carrboro Mayor Election, 2015
Candidate	Votes	%
Lydia E. Lavelle	1,749	96.36
Write-In (Miscellaneous)	66	3.64

Carrboro Mayor Election, 2017
Candidate	Votes	%
Lydia E. Lavelle	3,211	87.85
Michael (Mike) Benson	421	11.52
Write-In (Miscellaneous)	23	0.63
