= Eleanor Kinnaird =

American politician from North Carolina

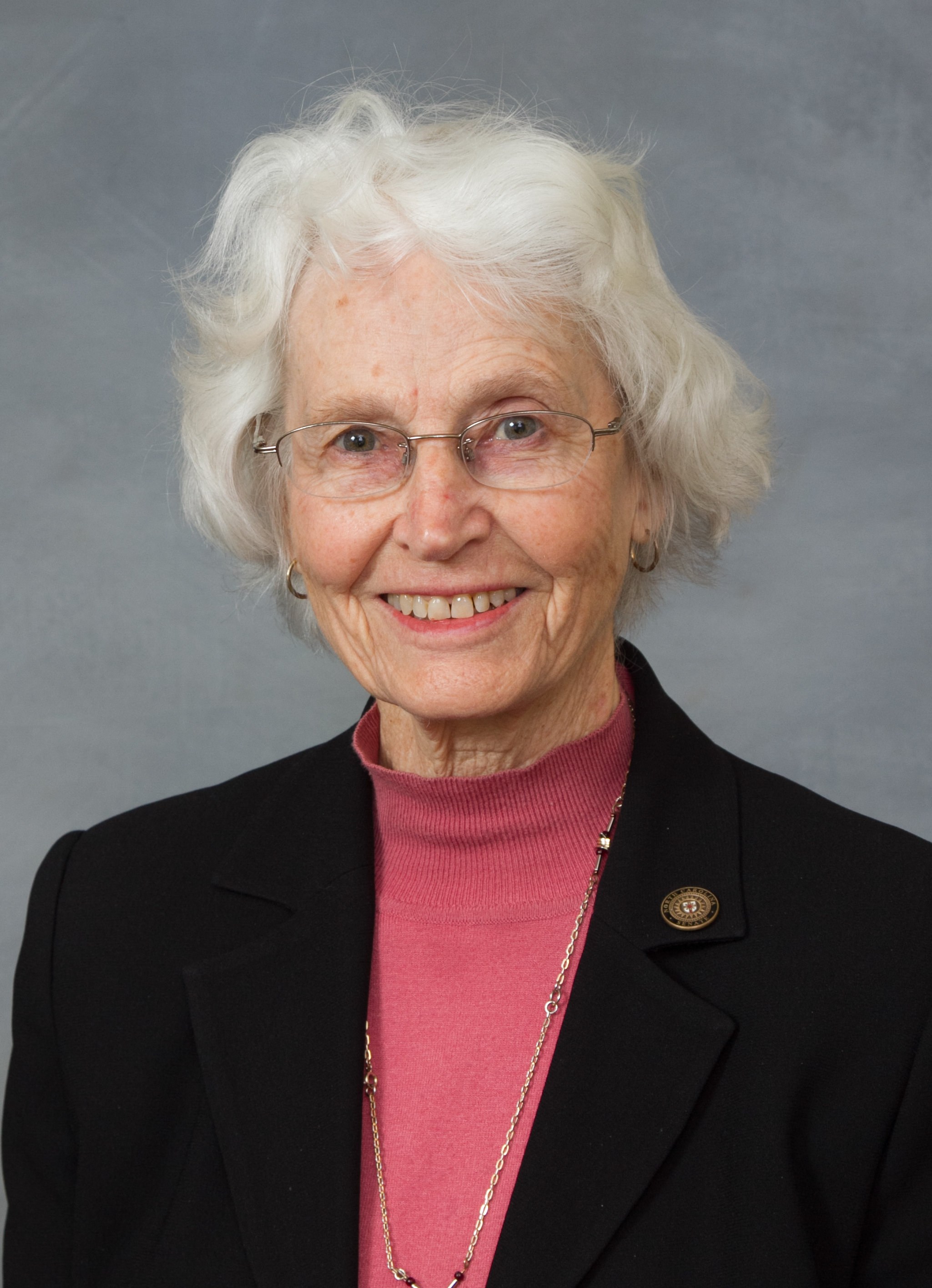

Member of the North Carolina Senate
- In office January 1, 1997 – August 19, 2013
- Preceded by: Fred M. Hobbs; Teena Smith Little
- Succeeded by: Valerie Foushee
- Constituency: 16th District (1997-2003); 23rd District (2003-2013)

Mayor of Carrboro
- In office 1987–1995
- Preceded by: James V. Porto Jr.
- Succeeded by: Mike Nelson

Personal details
- Born: November 14, 1931 (age 94) Rochester, Minnesota, U.S.
- Party: Democratic
- Spouse: Dan Pollit (Deceased)
- Education: Carleton College, University of North Carolina at Chapel Hill, North Carolina Central University,
- Profession: Politician, attorney

Eleanor Gates 'Ellie' Kinnaird (born November 14, 1931) is an American politician and attorney who served as a Democratic member of the North Carolina Senate from 1997 until her resignation in 2013. She was mayor of Carrboro, North Carolina from 1987 to 1996.

== Career ==
Kinnaird was mayor of Carrboro, North Carolina from 1987 to 1996; during that time, she also earned a Juris Doctor degree from North Carolina Central University (1992) and entered private practice. In 1996, she ran for and was elected to the North Carolina Senate. Her district included constituents in Orange and Chatham counties.

At one point, Kinnaird served as Chair of the Appropriations Committee on Justice and Public Safety, as Chair of the Mental Health and Youth Services committee and as Vice-Chair of the Agriculture/Environment/Natural Resources committee. In addition to these leadership positions and her other standing committee assignments on Appropriations/Base Budget, Finance, Health Care and Judiciary I (Civil), she was also a member of the NC Energy Policy Council and the Environmental Review Commission.

Senator Kinnaird is an advocate for electoral reform and lobby reform. For example, in 2005 she sponsored a bill to require that voting machine source code and election results in North Carolina can be audited; the bill passed the Senate 48-0 and was signed into law in August 2005.

Senator Kinnaird is also an advocate for environmental protection. She received a 100% rating from the Conservation Council of North Carolina.

A vocal opponent of the death penalty, in 2003 Senator Kinnaird sponsored a bill to initiate a moratorium on the death penalty in North Carolina; the bill passed the Senate 28-22, making the North Carolina Senate the first legislative body in the U.S. South to support a halt to executions.

=== Elections ===
In 2007, Kinnaird announced that she was contemplating whether or not to run in the next election, noting that she would like a woman to replace her in the Senate. She said that due to recent retirements and a dearth of female Senators, the Senate could be left with only three women if she retired, while there were seven women serving as Senators when she first took office.

As of October 2007 only three men (Moses Carey, John Herrera, and Mike Nelson) had announced their intentions to run for the Senate seat possibly being vacated by Kinnaird. Kinnaird announced she would seek re-election in 2008. Both Herrera and Nelson dropped out of the race after Kinnaird's announcement. Carey, however, stayed in and lost to Kinnaird by 64% to 36%.

Kinnaird won re-election in 2010 and in 2012.

Political offices
Preceded by James V. Porto Jr.	Mayor of Carrboro; 1987–1995	Succeeded by Mike Nelson
North Carolina Senate
Preceded by Fred M. Hobbs; Teena Smith Little	Member of the North Carolina Senate from the 16th district 1997–2003; Served alongside: Howard Lee	Succeeded by Eric Miller Reeves
Preceded by Cal Cunningham	Member of the North Carolina Senate from the 23rd district 2003–2013	Succeeded by Valerie Foushee
