= Jonathan Howes =

American politician (1937–2015)

Secretary of the North Carolina Department of Environment and Natural Resources
- In office 1992–1997
- Governor: Jim Hunt
- Preceded by: William W. Cobey, Jr.
- Succeeded by: Wayne McDevitt

Mayor of Chapel Hill, North Carolina
- In office 1987–1991
- Preceded by: James Wallace
- Succeeded by: Ken Broun

Personal details
- Born: April 11, 1937 Knoxville, Tennessee
- Died: May 31, 2015 (aged 78) Chapel Hill, North Carolina
- Party: Democratic
- Spouse: Mary Howes
- Children: Three
- Education: Wittenberg University (B.A.); University of North Carolina at Chapel Hill; Harvard University
- Profession: Politician

Jonathan Howes (April 11, 1937 – May 31, 2015) was an American politician and urban planner. He served as the director of the Center for Urban and Regional Studies at the University of North Carolina at Chapel Hill from 1970 until 1993. Howes began his political career as an elected member of the Chapel Hill Town Council from 1975 to 1987. He was then elected Mayor of Chapel Hill for two consecutive terms from 1987 to 1991. In 1991, North Carolina Governor Jim Hunt appointed Howes as Secretary of the North Carolina Department of Environment and Natural Resources, a state cabinet position he held from 1992 to 1997.

== Biography ==
=== Early life and career ===
Howes was raised in Fountain City, Tennessee, a neighborhood in northern Knoxville. He first visited Chapel Hill, North Carolina, in 1955 as a prospective student on high school student visitation to University of North Carolina at Chapel Hill (UNC). He enrolled at UNC as a freshman. However, he transferred to Wittenberg University after his freshman years with the goal of originally becoming a Lutheran minister. He received his bachelor's degree from Wittenberg in 1959. Howes re-enrolled at UNC for his graduate studies in 1959, obtaining a master's degree in city and regional planning.

He moved to Washington, D.C., in 1960 to take a position within the federal Department of Housing and Urban Development during the Kennedy administration. In 1966, Howes completed another master's degree in public administration from Harvard University.

In 1970, Howes and his family returned to Chapel Hill from the D.C. area to become the director of the Center for Urban and Regional Studies at the University of North Carolina at Chapel Hill. He served as the center's director for 23 years, from 1970 to 1993.

=== Political career ===
Howes was elected to the Chapel Hill Town Council in 1975 and served on continuously until 1987. He was elected Mayor of Chapel Hill in 1987, serving two terms until 1991. Howes focused on improving relations between UNC and the larger Chapel Hill community during his tenure as mayor. Under Howes, Chapel Hill constructed a new town hall, library, and expanded city parks and greenspaces. Additional neighborhoods were also annexed to Chapel Hill in 1990, which required attention to community relations.

As Mayor of Chapel Hill, Howes also contributed his expertise on regional planning during his tenure on as the Triangle J Council of Governments.

North Carolina Governor Jim Hunt appointed Howes as Secretary of the North Carolina Department of Environment and Natural Resources in 1992. Under Howes, the state government established the North Carolina Parks and Recreation Trust Fund, which provides funding for coastal access programs, state parks and local recreational areas. He served as Secretary for five years, from 1992 to 1997. Howes was later awarded the Order of the Long Leaf Pine, North Carolina's highest honor, for his contributions as secretary.

=== Return to UNC ===
In 1997, Howes was appointed Special Assistant to the Chancellor James Moeser for Community Affairs at UNC-Chapel Hill. Howes served as the Special Assistant for both Chancellor Moeser and his successor, Holden Thorp, until his retirement from UNC in 2010.

Howes oversaw UNC's "town-gown" relations between the university and the larger community as a special assistant to the chancellor. He and David Godschalk, a former Chapel Hill Town Council member and professor emeritus at the UNC Department of City and Regional Planning, co-chaired the 2000 Campus Master Plan project, which oversaw the planned 6 million square foot expansion of the existing UNC Chapel Hill campus.

In addition to his positions at UNC, Howes served as the interim general manager of WUNC Radio, the flagship National Public Radio member station for the Research Triangle area of North Carolina, from 2001 to 2002, while the station sought a permanent general manager. He was also a member of WUNC's Community Advisory Board. He served as the interim director of the North Carolina Botanical Garden for almost four months in 2015.

Jonathan Howes died of complications from heart disease at UNC Hospitals in Chapel Hill on May 31, 2015, at the age of 78. He was survived by his wife of 55 years, Mary Howes; their three children – Anne Anderson, Betsy Howes-Bean and Bo Howes; and eight grandchildren – Margaret, Elizabeth Karen, and David (Anne), Benjamin, and Rebecca (Betsy), and Jonathan, Maxwell, and Matthew (Bo).

== See also ==
- List of mayors of Chapel Hill, North Carolina
