= North Carolina State Board of Education Teaching Certification =

All professional employees of public schools must hold a license for the subject or grade level they teach or for the professional assignment they hold. Licenses are issued in administrative, supervisory, student service, and teaching areas. Teaching areas encompass birth through kindergarten, elementary (K-6), middle grades (6–9), secondary grades (9–12), special subjects (K-12), exceptional children (K-12), and vocational education. The standard basis for license is the completion of a National Council for Accreditation of Teacher Education (NCATE) approved education program at an accredited college or university (See North Carolina NCATE accredited programs below).

== History ==
=== 1845-1877 ===
North Carolina first made an effort to hire qualified teachers in 1845. This act required school committees to "contract with a suitable teacher for their respective district, with strict regard to be had to the qualification and moral character of said teacher." In 1847, the law was made more precise, and a committee of examination was created to appraise the adequacy of the teachers in the common schools. The provision stated, "the board of superintendents are authorized and empowered to appoint a committee of examination, consisting of not more than five persons, whose duty it shall be to examine into the qualifications, both mental and moral, of all such persons as may apply for employment as teachers in any of the common schools in their respective counties. No person shall be employed as a teacher in any of the common schools in any county of the State in which an examining committee is appointed, unless he obtain from a majority of the committee of examination for the county in which he seeks employment a certificate of his good moral character and sufficient mental qualifications as such teacher." In 1852, the law was amended, establishing a committee of no more than five persons, with whom the chairman of the board is established. The amended act also stated, "no certificate issued to a teacher shall be good for a term for more than one year, and shall not be good for any county other than the county that issued the certificate." A new administrative position was created in 1872, giving title to the new "County Examiner." The position duties involved, "the County Examiner of each county shall examine all applicants for teachers' certificates at the courthouse of each county on the first Thursday of January and July of every year, and continue the examination from day to day during the remainder of the week, if necessary, till all applicants are examined. He shall grant certificates to all applicants of sufficient moral and mental qualification. If any person shall apply for an examination and certificate at any other time, the applicant shall pay the Examiner a fee of one dollar. If the County Examiner shall become satisfied that any person to whom a teacher's certificate has been granted is guilty of any immoral or disreputable conduct, he shall revoke the certificate and give notice to the secretary of the County Board of Education."

=== 1877-1897 ===
In 1877, each county was required to provide for a "County Examiner", who was appointed by the County Board of Education. "The County Examiner of each county shall examine all applicants for teachers' certificates at the courthouse of the county on the second Thursday of August and October of every year, and continue the examination from day to day during the remainder of the week, if necessary, till all applicants are examined. He shall grant certificates to all applicants of sufficient moral and mental qualifications, and shall give certificates in three grades, as follows: If applicants are qualified to teach classes in the higher branches of English, they shall receive certificates of the first grade; if qualified to teach only in the ordinary branches of English, they shall be given a certificate of the second grade; and all applicants qualified to teach primary classes, only, shall be given certificates of the third grade." A revision of the 1872 and 1877 laws was made in 1881.

The 1881, "A Revisions of the Public School Laws Act" created the position of "County Superintendent of Public Instruction" who was to hold the examination for teachers' certificates. The grade of the certificate given was changed to be based upon a "per centum" grade. The County Superintendent of Public Instruction of each county shall examine all worthy applicants. The grade of the certificate to which the applicant may be entitled shall conform to the following standard of excellence: that is, one hundred being the maximum, a certificate shall not be issued to any applicant who makes less than fifty per centum in any one branch, or whose general average is less than seventy per centum. A general average of ninety per centum and over shall entitle an applicant to a first-grade certificate; a general average of eighty per centum or more shall entitle the applicant to a second-grade certificate; and a general average of seventy per centum or more shall entitle an applicant to a third-grade certificate; but a third-grade certificate may be issued if the applicant is proficient in spelling, reading, writing, and the four fundamental rules of arithmetic. The certificates shall be valid for one year from their dates and only in the county in which they are issued." Changes were made in 1889 with an, "Act to Amend Public School Laws." The act stated, "Partial third-grade certificates are hereby abolished. The conductor of any county institute, acting with the County Superintendent, may hold examinations and grant first-grade certificates, which shall be signed by both and shall be valid for three years. Such certificates may be made valid in any county by endorsement of the Superintendent thereof. That in addition to the requirement for obtaining a first-grade certificate, the applicant must, after one year from the ratification of this act, stand a satisfactory examination upon some books on school economy and theory and practice of teaching, to be selected by the State Superintendent of Public Instruction."

In 1893 the first law was passed which recognized a teacher's life certificate. This life certificate was given to those who had graduated from Peabody Normal College in Nashville, TN. "That the graduates from Peabody Normal College, Nashville, Tennessee, in the degree of Licentiate of Instruction, and any higher degrees conferred by said institution, shall be recognized in this State as certified for life as teachers in any and all public schools. That this privilege is subject to revocation by the State Superintendent of Public Instruction, or by the State Board of Education, at his or their discretion, for cause."

In 1897, a new board, the Board of Examiners was created to conduct examinations. It composed of three professional teachers to be appointed by the State Board of Education, with the State Superintendent of Public Instruction serving as the chairman. "The State Board of Education shall appoint biennially a State Board of Examiners, who shall consist of three professional teachers, and the State Superintendent of Public Instruction shall be ex officio chairman of the said board. The State Board of School Examiners shall have power to grant first-grade life certificates, which may be used in any county in the State, and shall furnish to the public, at least one month before the examination full information as to the nature and character of the requirements for such first-grade life certificates." Another change was adopted in 1897, permanent teachers' certificates were granted to applicants who passed the required examination, provided that applicants show that every five years that they had been and still were teaching. "Provided, that every first-grade life certificate, to continue valid and operative, shall be renewed by the State Board of School Examiners every five years, and before said board shall renew said certificate it shall be accompanied with an affidavit of the teacher holding said certificate that he or she has been actually engaged in teaching school since receiving said certificate, or since its last renewal; and no charge shall be made for such renewal."

=== 1897-1915 ===
"An Act to Revise and Consolidate the Public School Law of 1901" provides that the minimum age of persons to whom certificates shall be issued shall be eighteen years. Other provisions are that no third-grade certificate shall be renewed and no holder of a third-grade certificate shall be employed except as an assistant teacher.

During the same year an act was passed repealing the law granting graduates or students of institutions of learning certificates to teach. The law states, "That all laws and clauses of laws granting to, or conferring upon, the graduates or ex-students or students of any institution of learning, private or public, within the State or elsewhere, immunity, exemption, or freedom from the operation of laws of this State requiring persons who desire to teach in free public schools of the State to submit to and pass regular examinations before the County Superintendents of Education before being duly qualified to serve as such teachers, be and the same are hereby repealed."

During the legislative session of 1905 a law was passed empowering the State Superintendent of Public Instruction, at his discretion, to provide for a uniform system of gradation, examination, and certification of teachers. "The State Superintendent of Public Instruction may, in his discretion, provide for a uniform system of gradation, examination and certification of public school teachers, prescribing the examination, the time and manner of conducting the same, and also for making provision for the classification of teachers' certificates into primary, intermediate, and high school."

In 1907 an act was passed providing for a first-grade State certificate for teachers, to be valid for a period of 5 years. This law provides: "In addition to the three grades of certificates herein provided, a certificate known as State certificate, signed by the State Superintendent and Board of Examiners hereinafter provided, shall be issued to any person who upon examination by said Board of Examiners shall make a general average of not less than ninety per cent." Other requirements included, "That no person shall be permitted to stand such examination without first filing with the State Superintendent of Public Instruction a statement from the County Superintendent of Public Instruction of the county in which said applicant last taught that said applicant holds a first-grade certificate and has taught successfully at least one year." This first-grade State certificate was to be valid in any county in the State, and no other examination or certificate as a prerequisite for teaching a public school shall be required of any person holding the State certificate for a period of five years from the date of issue of said State certificate.

New laws of 1915 were more liberal than the previous one. Greater consideration was given to the teacher, offering a greater inducement to the teacher who had received professional and academic training at a higher institution of learning.

The teacher who was given a first-grade State certificate for five years was, previously, required to make an average marking of ninety per cent; the new law requires the applicant to make only seventy-five per cent to secure this certificate.

The more important and significant provision of the new law was, "that the Board of Examiners may, in their discretion, and in lieu of examination, allow certain credits for academic and professional work done in approved institutions and for successful experience; and said high school teacher's certificate shall be subject to renewal and may, in the discretion of the Board of Examiners, on its second renewal be converted into a life certificate."

== License categories ==
There are two professional educator's licensure categories in North Carolina.

=== Standard Professional 1 (SP1) Professional Educator's Licenses ===
These are intended for teachers with 0–2 years of teaching experience, and are valid for three years. To be issued a SP1 Professional Educator's License, an individual must have:

- Completed a state approved teacher education program from a regionally accredited college or university OR;
- Completed another state's approved alternative route to licensure, met the federal requirements to be designated as "Highly Qualified," and earned a bachelor's degree from a regionally accredited college.

=== Standard Professional 2 (SP2) Professional Educator's Licenses ===
These are intended for teachers with 3 or more years of teaching experience, and are valid for five years. To be issued a SP2 Professional Educator's License, an individual must be:

- Teachers who are fully licensed and "Highly Qualified" in another state who have three or more years of teaching experience in another state AND;
- Teachers meet NC's Praxis testing requirements OR;
- Have National Board Certification

== NCATE Accredited Education Institutions in North Carolina ==
The following North Carolina educational institutions are accredited by the National Council for Accreditation of Teacher Education (NCATE):

- Appalachian State University
- Barton College
- Bennett College for Women
- Campbell University
- Catawba College
- Chowan University
- Duke University
- East Carolina University
- Elizabeth City State University
- Elon University
- Fayetteville State University
- Gardner-Webb University
- Greensboro College
- High Point University
- Johnson C. Smith University
- Lees-McRae College
- Lenoir-Rhyne University
- Livingstone College
- Mars Hill College
- Meredith College
- Methodist University
- Montreat College
- North Carolina A & T State University
- North Carolina Central University
- North Carolina State University
- North Carolina Wesleyan College
- Pfeiffer University
- Queens University of Charlotte
- Saint Andrews Presbyterian College
- Saint Augustine's College
- Salem College
- Shaw University
- University of North Carolina at Asheville
- University of North Carolina at Pembroke
- University of North Carolina at Chapel Hill
- University of North Carolina at Charlotte
- University of North Carolina at Greensboro
- University of North Carolina at Wilmington
- Wake Forest University
- Western Carolina University
- Wingate University
- Winston-Salem State University
