= Michael R. Nelson =

American politician

Orange County Commissioner
- In office 2006–2009

Mayor of Carrboro, North Carolina
- In office December 5, 1995 – December 6, 2005
- Preceded by: Eleanor Kinnaird
- Succeeded by: Mark Chilton

Personal details
- Party: Democratic Party
- Education: University of North Carolina at Chapel Hill

Michael R. Nelson is an American politician who served as mayor of Carrboro, North Carolina from 1995 to 2005, and as a county commissioner for Orange County from 2006 to 2009. Nelson, who is a co-founder of Equality North Carolina, was the first openly gay mayor in North Carolina. At the time of his inauguration, he was one of five openly gay mayors in the United States. When he left office in 2005, he was the longest-serving mayor in Carrboro's history.

== Early life and education ==
Mike Nelson grew up in Jacksonville, North Carolina. His father was an attorney for the United States Marine Corps, and his mother was a teacher.

He attended the University of North Carolina at Chapel Hill, and came out as gay his sophomore year. He graduated in 1989 with a degree in political science, and eventually became a production manager for a clothing manufacturing company in Chapel Hill.

== Political career ==
In 1987, Nelson managed Joe Herzenberg's successful campaign for election to the Chapel Hill Town Council. He then started his own political career in the nearby town of Carrboro, and in 1989 he sought election to the town's board of aldermen, losing by 30 votes. In 1990, he participated in local campaign efforts for the Democratic Party, and thereafter co-founded North Carolina Pride PAC for Lesbian and Gay Equality, a political action committee which lobbied for the repeal of North Carolina's anti-sodomy law.

In 1993 he again sought election to the Carrboro Board of Aldermen, and won with backing from the Gay & Lesbian Victory Fund. During his tenure, Nelson convinced the board to pass two measures to recognize domestic partnerships, including offering health benefits to domestic partners of town employees.

In 1995, Nelson sought election as mayor of Carrboro, downplaying his sexuality and focusing on environmental issues, development, and taxation. He defeated two other candidates in the November election, earning almost 50 percent of the votes. Nelson was seated as mayor on December 5, 1995. His inauguration made him one of five openly gay mayors in the United States at the time, and the first openly gay mayor in North Carolina.

In 1997, he and the aldermen agreed to purchase the building of the former Carrboro Baptist Church, which was subsequently turned into town offices and an events center. The following year, the town created a Fête de la Musique committee, with Nelson serving as a founding member.

Nelson left office in 2005, departing as the longest-serving mayor in Carrboro's history. The following year, he was elected to a seat on the Orange County Board of Commissioners. In 2007, he registered as a candidate for a seat in the North Carolina General Assembly, but withdrew when incumbent Eleanor Kinnaird announced her intention to seek re-election. In 2009, he announced his decision to not seek reelection to the county commission. In 2017, he signed an open letter endorsing the Durham–Orange Light Rail Transit project.

== Works cited ==
- Otto, Dave; Ellington, Dave (2015). Carrboro. Arcadia Publishing. ISBN 9781467122467.

Political offices
Preceded by Eleanor Kinnaird	Mayor of Carrboro; 1995–2005	Succeeded by Mark Chilton
