= List of mayors of Carrboro, North Carolina =

Mayor of Carrboro
- Incumbent; Barbara Foushee since 2023
- Status: Active
- Formation: 1911
- First holder: William H. Parker
- Website: townofcarrboro.org

The mayor of Carrboro is the presiding member of the governing body of Carrboro, North Carolina, United States. The office has been occupied since the town's incorporation as the Town of Venable in 1911. The town council is composed of the mayor, who serves a term of two years, and six council members serving staggered terms of four years.

== List ==
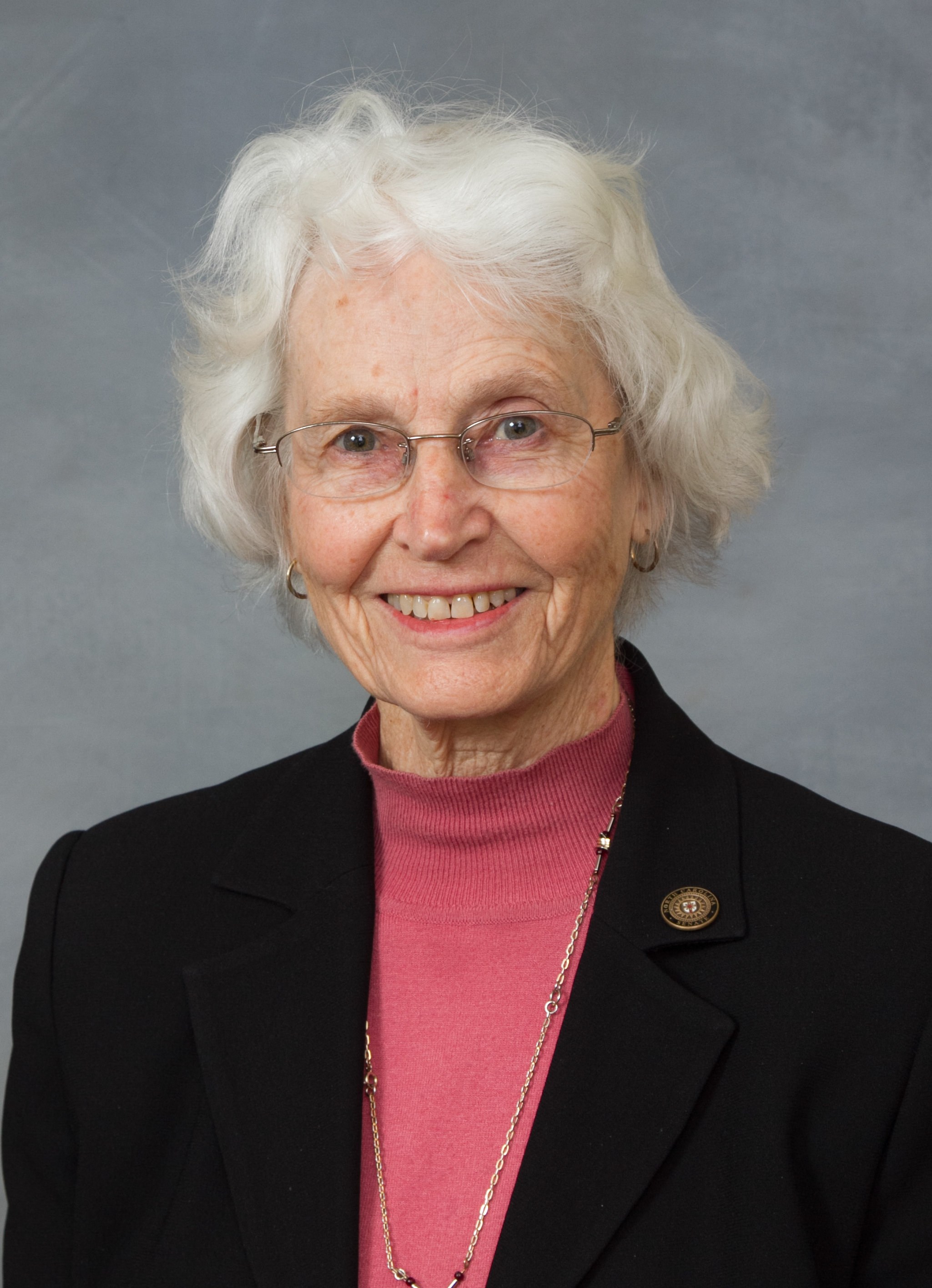
Eleanor Kinnaird was mayor of Carrboro from 1987 to 1995.

- William H. Parker (1911–1917; 1937–1941)
- Thomas "Newt" Mann (1917–1918; 1923–1927)
- Braxton Bynum Lloyd (1918–1919)
- Hyde Bryan Durham (1919–1923; 1927–1933)
- Seaton E. Lloyd (1923)
- Clifton C. Head (1933–1935)
- Roy Rigsbee (1935–1937)
- Robert B. Studebaker (1941–1943)
- Isaac A. West (1943–1949)
- Isaac F. "Dawson" Hardee (1949–1951)
- J. Sullivan "Hoot" Gibson (1951–1955)
- Robert B. Todd (1955–1960)
- Charles Taylor Ellington (1960–1966)
- H. Bryant Hackney (1966–1967)
- T. Hughes Lloyd (1967–1971)
- Robert J. Wells (1971–1975)
- Ruth West (1975–1977)
- Robert W. Drakeford (1977–1983)
- James V. Porto Jr (1983–1987)
- Eleanor Kinnaird (1987–1995)
- Michael R. Nelson (1995–2005)
- Mark Chilton (2005–2013)
- Lydia Lavelle (2013–2021)
- Damon Seils (2021–2023)
- Barbara Foushee (2023–)
