= Phil Kirk =

American politician

- Kirk c. 1971

Chairman of the North Carolina State Board of Education
- In office 1997–2003
- Succeeded by: Howard Nathaniel Lee

Secretary of the North Carolina Department of Human Resources
- In office 1985–1987
- Governor: James G. Martin
- Preceded by: Lucy H. Bode
- Succeeded by: Paul Kayye
- In office 1976–1977
- Governor: James Holshouser
- Preceded by: David Flaherty
- Succeeded by: Sarah T. Morrow

Phillip J. Kirk Jr. (born November 24, 1944) is a North Carolina political figure. He is a former chairman of the North Carolina State Board of Education (1997–2003) and a former president of the North Carolina Chamber of Commerce (then known as North Carolina Citizens for Business and Industry, or NCCBI).

Kirk, a native of Rowan County, North Carolina and a graduate of Catawba College, worked as a newspaper reporter and taught English and journalism in public schools before entering politics. In 1970, he became the youngest person ever elected to the North Carolina Senate up to that time, representing Rowan County as a Republican. He later served as chief of staff to U.S. Representative Jim Broyhill, and to North Carolina Governors Jim Holshouser and James G. Martin. He served twice as North Carolina Secretary of Human Resources. Kirk also served on the North Carolina Board of Community Colleges.

In 2006, upon leaving his position at NCCBI, Kirk became Vice President of External Relations at Catawba College, where he was formerly a member of the board of trustees.

In 2007, Kirk was elected chairman of the Public School Forum of North Carolina.
