= List of mayors of Chapel Hill, North Carolina =

Mayor of Chapel Hill
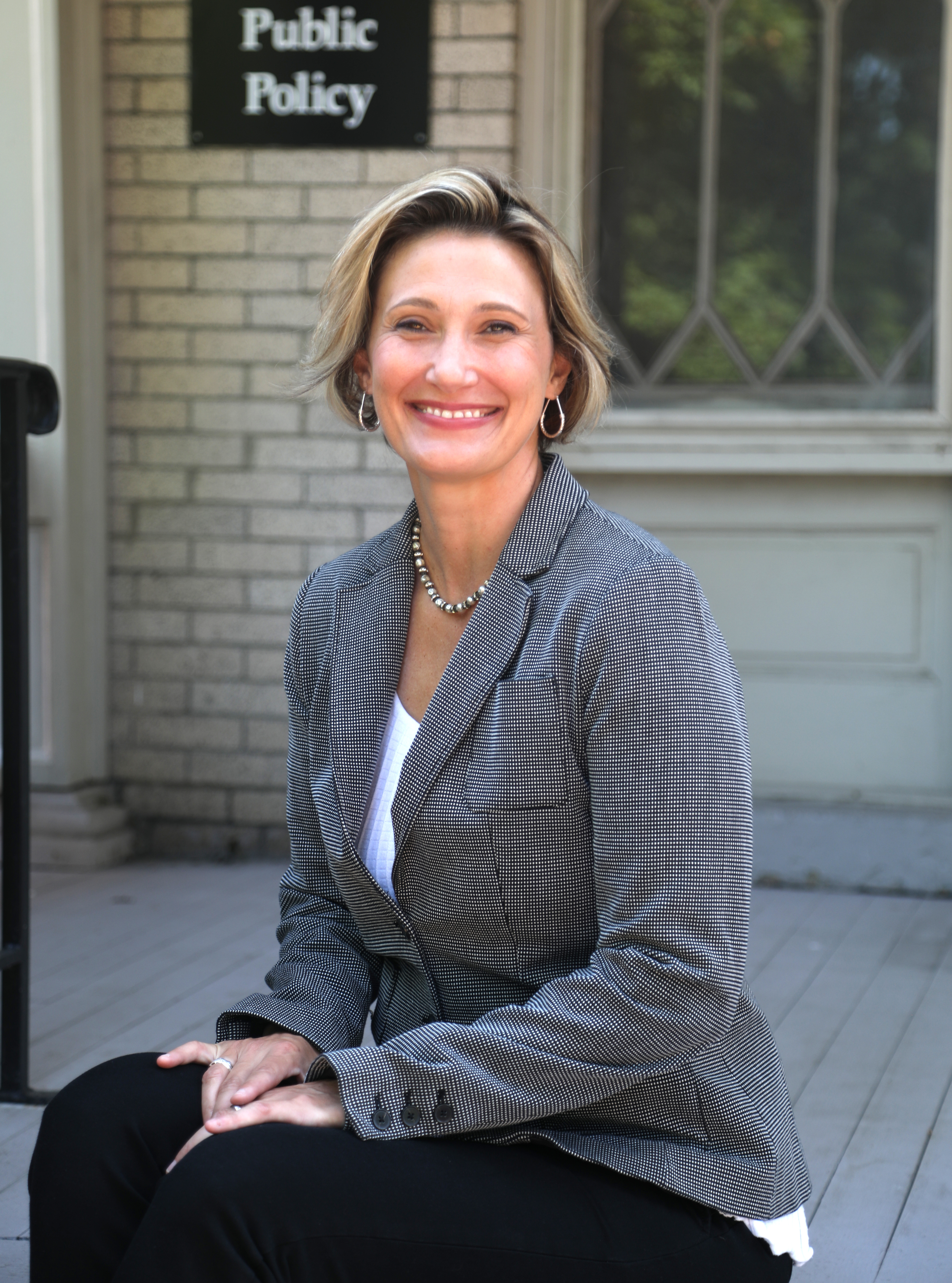
- Incumbent; Jessica Anderson since 2023
- Status: Active
- Formation: 1869
- First holder: Hugh Blair Guthrie
- Website: www.townofchapelhill.org

The Mayor of Chapel Hill is the head of the governing and legislative body of the town of Chapel Hill, North Carolina, United States. As chair of the eight-member town council, the mayor presides over all meetings of the council and may vote on all issues before the council.

The mayor is recognized as the official head of the town for civil processes by the courts and ceremonial processes by the public. The mayor is the principal representative of the council for relations with federal, state, and other local governments.

The duties of the town council – of which the mayor presides – are "to adopt and provide for the execution of such ordinances, rules, and regulations ... as may be necessary or appropriate to protect health, life, or property, or to preserve or promote the comfort, convenience, security, good order, better government, or the general welfare of the town or its inhabitants".

Members of the council are chosen in a nonpartisan election; councilors serve staggered four-year terms, and the mayor serves two-year terms. Candidates must be registered voters and residents of Chapel Hill but while in office not appointed to any other paid government position. Councilors and the mayor must disclose all property held in the town, as well as one's business interests.

As with all members of the council, the mayor may be excused from voting on matters involving the member's official or financial conduct. Otherwise, a member's lack of a vote when the member is present is deemed an affirmative vote.

A vacancy in the office is to be filled for the remainder of the term. Should a quorum on the council (of a majority of members) not be obtained, the mayor may appoint enough members to make a quorum, and the council shall fill the other vacancies. (In the absence of the mayor, the governor may fill the vacancies.)

Before 1879, the mayor was a magistrate hired by the Board of Commissioners to exercise police powers. An 1879 amendment to the town charter formalized this role. An 1895 charter amendment established the mayor as a position elected by the town's citizens. John H. Watson became the first person elected as mayor on May 5, 1895.

== List ==
#	Mayor	Term start	Term end
1	Hugh Blair Guthrie	1869	1872
2	John H. Watson	1872	1872
3	John W. Carr	1873	1874
4	John White	1874	1874
5	Andrew Mickel	1874	1876
6	John H. Watson	1876	1879
7	Merritt Cheek	1879	1882
8	Jones Watson	1882	1883
9	John H. Watson	1883	1884
10	A.J. McDade	1884	1885
11	John H. Watson	1885	1887
12	William N. Pritchard	1887	1888
13	A.J. McDade	1888	1891
14	John H. Watson	1891	1895
15	Algernon S. Barbee	1895	1901
16	James C. MacRae Jr.	1901	1903
17	William S. Roberson	1903	1907
18	Algernon S. Barbee	1907	1911
19	William S. Roberson	1911	1913
20	L.P. McLendon	1913	1914
21	William S. Roberson	1914	1927
22	Zebulon Council	1927	1933
23	John M. Foushee	1933	1942
24	R.W. Madry	1942	1949
25	Edwin S. Lanier	1949	1954
26	Oliver K. Cornwell	1954	1961
27	Roland McClamroch	1961	1969
28	Howard Nathaniel Lee	1969	1975
29	James Wallace	1975	1979
30	Joseph L. Nassif	1979	1985
31	James Wallace	1985	1987
32	Jonathan Howes	1987	1991
34	Kenneth Broun	1991	1995
35	Rosemary Waldorf	1995	2001
36	Kevin Foy	2001	2009
37	Mark Kleinschmidt	2009	2015
38	Pam Hemminger	2015	2023
39	Jessica Anderson	2023	Incumbent
