= The Preservation Society of Chapel Hill =

Historical/restoration society

Coordinates: 35.9178°N 79.0452°W

The logo of The Preservation Society of Chapel Hill, as it appears on its brochures and advertising.

The Preservation Society of Chapel Hill (PSCH) is a tax-exempt, nonprofit organization located in Chapel Hill, North Carolina. Founded in 1972 by Ida Friday (wife of William Friday) and Georgia Kyser (wife of Kay Kyser), the society works to save and restore Chapel Hill's natural and man-made, historic artifacts. PSCH is heavily involved in the preservation of local murals, rock walls, historic neighborhoods, and important local structures. In addition, the group works with the Town of Chapel Hill and other local governments to promote government zoning of historic locales and districts, and it promotes legislation that could aid conservationist efforts. To further increase the town's enthusiasm about its history, the society periodically gives tours of Chapel Hill's salient historic landmarks.

== Horace Williams House ==
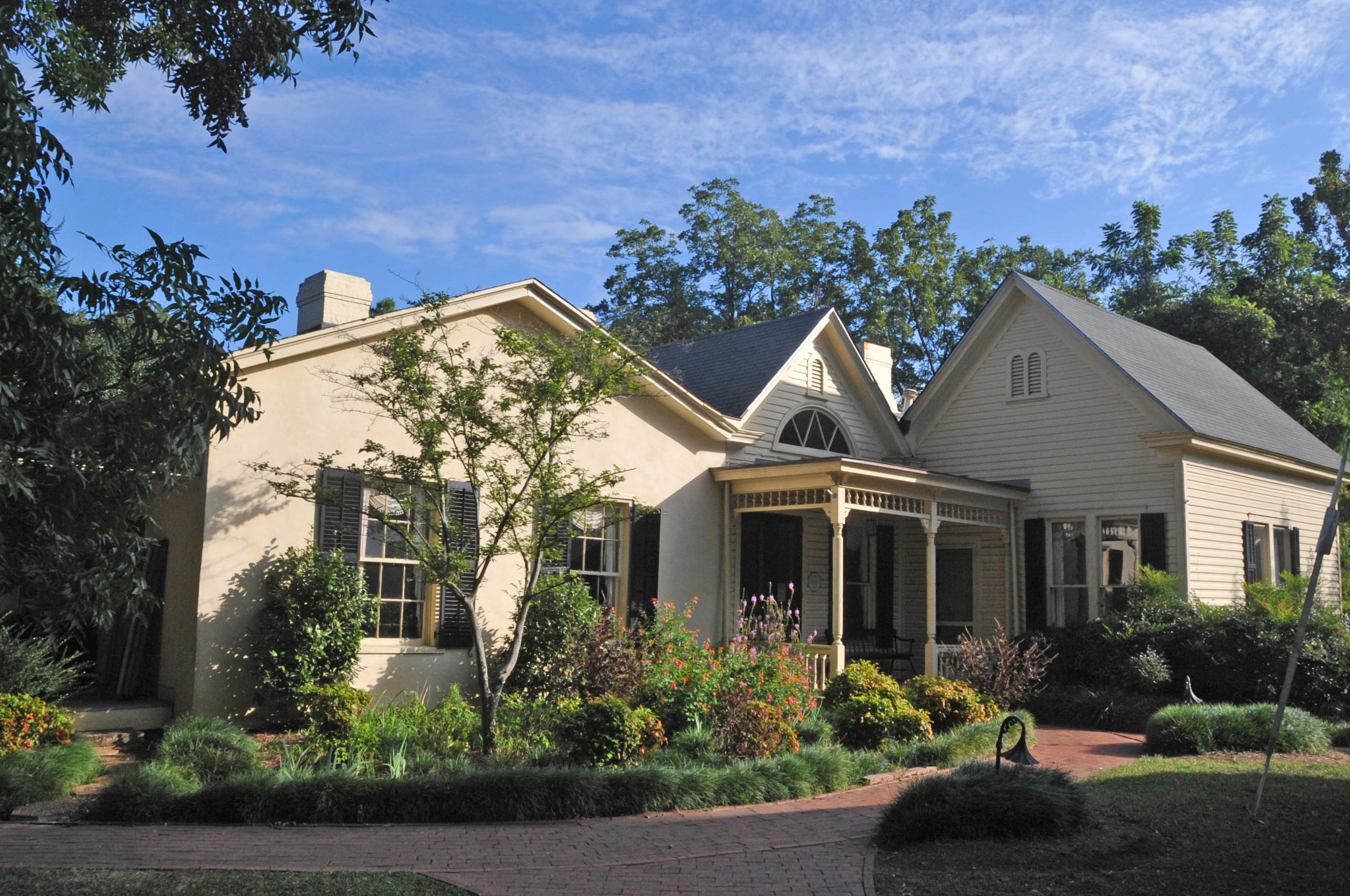
The Horace Williams House

The Preservation Society is headquartered in the Horace Williams House, the only historic site in Chapel Hill open to the public year-round. At this location, the organization hosts a variety of community events and art exhibitions, including theatrical productions, book readings, community art showings, musical performances, and "lunchbox" lectures.

== History ==
Professor Henry Horace Williams, owner of the Horace Williams House, was a professor of philosophy at the University of North Carolina at Chapel Hill from 1890 until his death in 1940. After his death, his house was bequeathed to UNC, and it was eventually restored to its current condition in 1974. Construction of the house began around 1840, and the house was finished in its early stages by Benjamin Hendrick in 1854. The house then went through a series of prominent owners- Professor H. Hosea Smith acquired the house in 1857, and University President George T. Winston acquired it in 1879. Horace Williams, finally, gained possession of the property in 1897. Later structural additions to the house were completed in the 1850s and 1880s.
