= Henry Horace Williams =

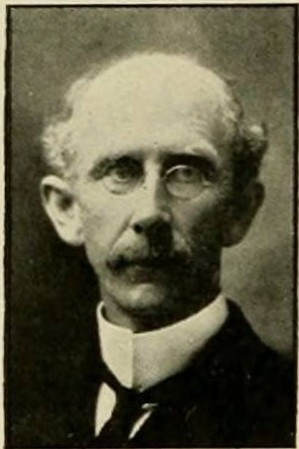
- Born: 1858; Gates County, North Carolina
- Died: 1940 (aged 81–82)
- Occupation: philosopher

Henry Horace Williams (1858–1940) was a professor of philosophy at the University of North Carolina at Chapel Hill from 1890 to 1940. From 1921 to 1935 he was a Kenan Professor of philosophy at UNC, and from 1936-1940 he was a professor emeritus. After being invited to teach at UNC, he became the first chair of the Mental and Moral Sciences Department, which is today better known as the Department of Philosophy.

His many interests were varied, yet his especial focus was logic and its humanistic aspects and evolution. He was an owner of the Horace Williams House in Chapel Hill, NC, where The Preservation Society of Chapel Hill is headquartered, beginning in 1897. Horace died in 1940 - nearing death, Horace donated his home and outlying properties to UNC's Philosophy Department. This outlying property eventually became the well-known Horace Williams Airport in Chapel Hill.

== Biography ==
Williams was born in 1858 in Gates County, North Carolina to a farming family; his father was a country doctor who did not attend college. Williams attended the Academy in Murfreesboro, North Carolina, where he had "an intellectual conversion which determined the direction of his whole future life" (Origin of Belief, p. 196). He went on to attend UNC in 1879 and later attended Yale Divinity School, where he achieved his B.D. degree in 1888.

While he was a student in the Yale Divinity School he was not infrequently called before the committee, not for any fault in his conduct but because he openly questioned, even rejected, some of the statements of his orthodox professors... The only authority which he recognized as final was the authority of truth. -Origin of Belief, p.196

He went on to teach philosophy courses at Harvard.

Williams was well known in Chapel Hill. Robert Watson Winston wrote a book called Horace Williams: Gadfly of Chapel Hill. He also appears in Thomas Wolfe's Look Homeward, Angel as Professor Vergil Weldon.

Notable students:

- Sam Ervin, chair of the Senate Watergate Committee
- Edward Kidder Graham, acting president of UNC in 1914
- Graham Kenan
- Thomas Wolfe, American novelist
- Anna Forbes Liddell, one of the first two women to earn a Ph.D. at the University of North Carolina

== Published works ==
- The Evolution of Logic (1925)
- Modern Logic (1927)
- The Education of Horace Williams (1936)
- The Good Teacher (1945)
- Logic for Living (1951)
- The Origin of Belief (1978)
