= Alexander Hogan Plantation =

- U.S. National Register of Historic Places
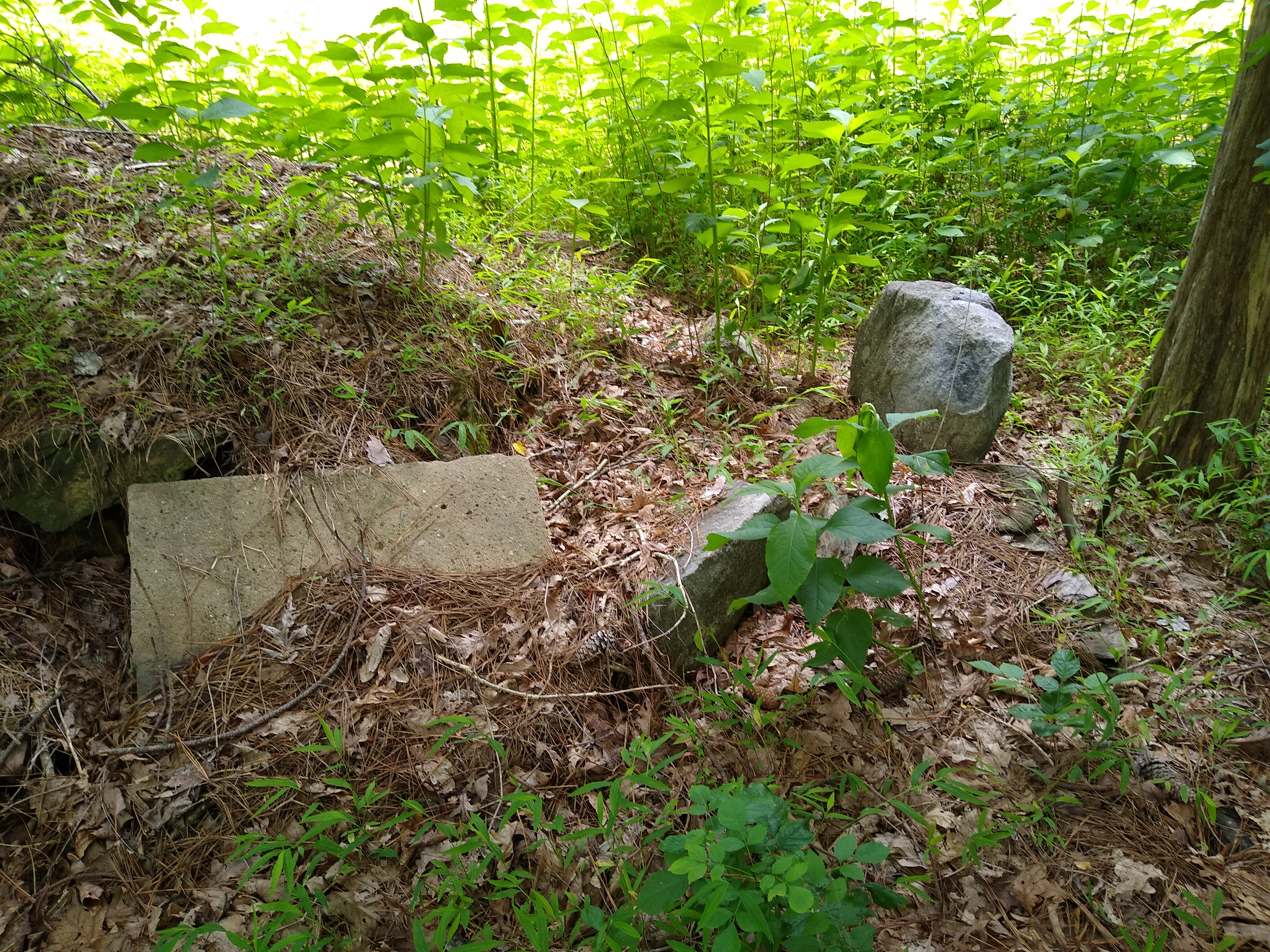
- Nearest city: Chapel Hill, North Carolina
- Area: 12.4 acres (5.0 ha)
- NRHP reference No.: 96000186
- Added to NRHP: March 4, 1996

Alexander Hogan Plantation is a historic archaeological site located near Chapel Hill, Orange County, North Carolina. The site was inhabited between 1838 and 1890, and consists of four stone outbuilding foundations, a chimney fall, and a cemetery.

It was listed on the National Register of Historic Places in 1996.

== Gallery ==
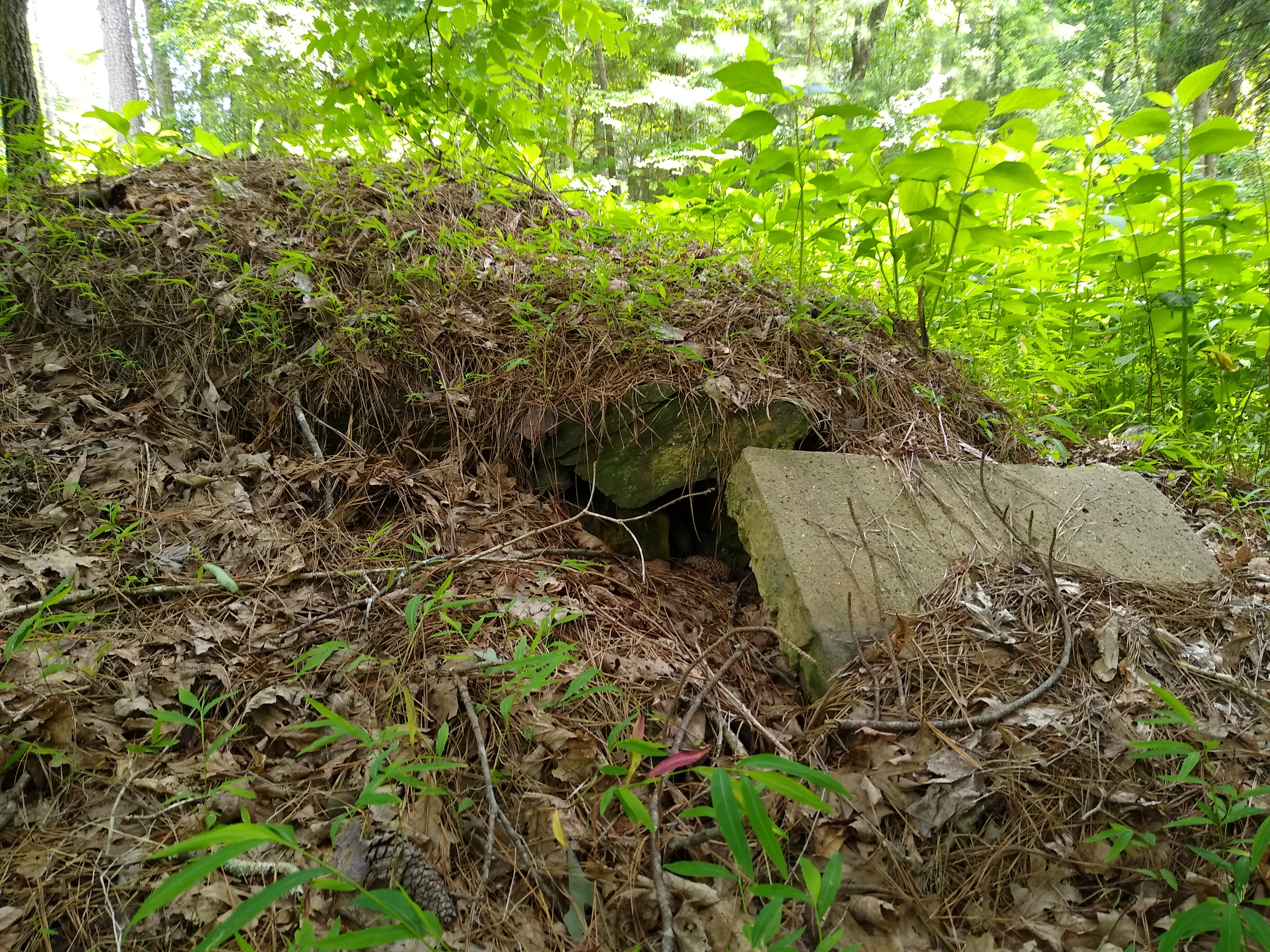

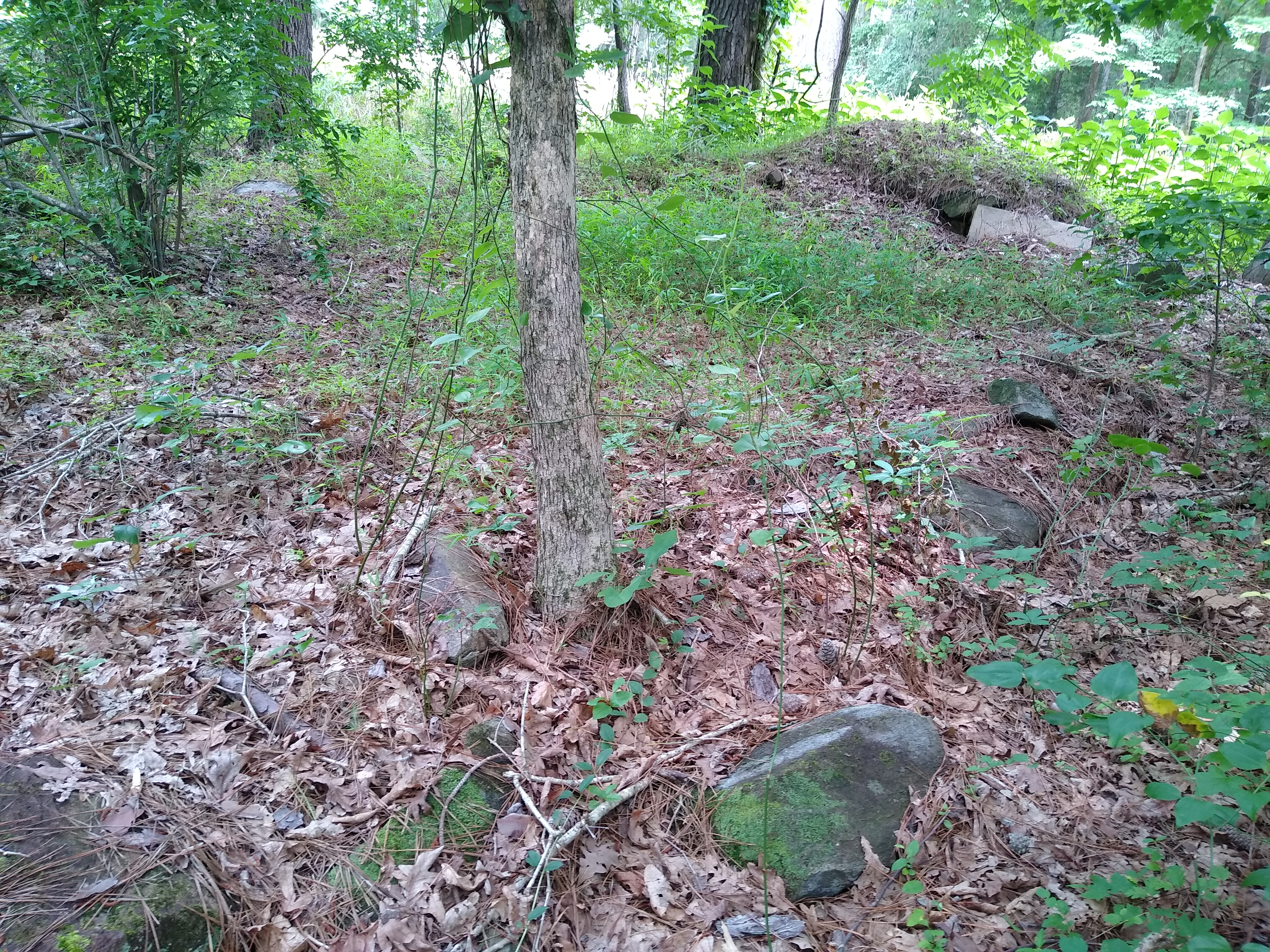

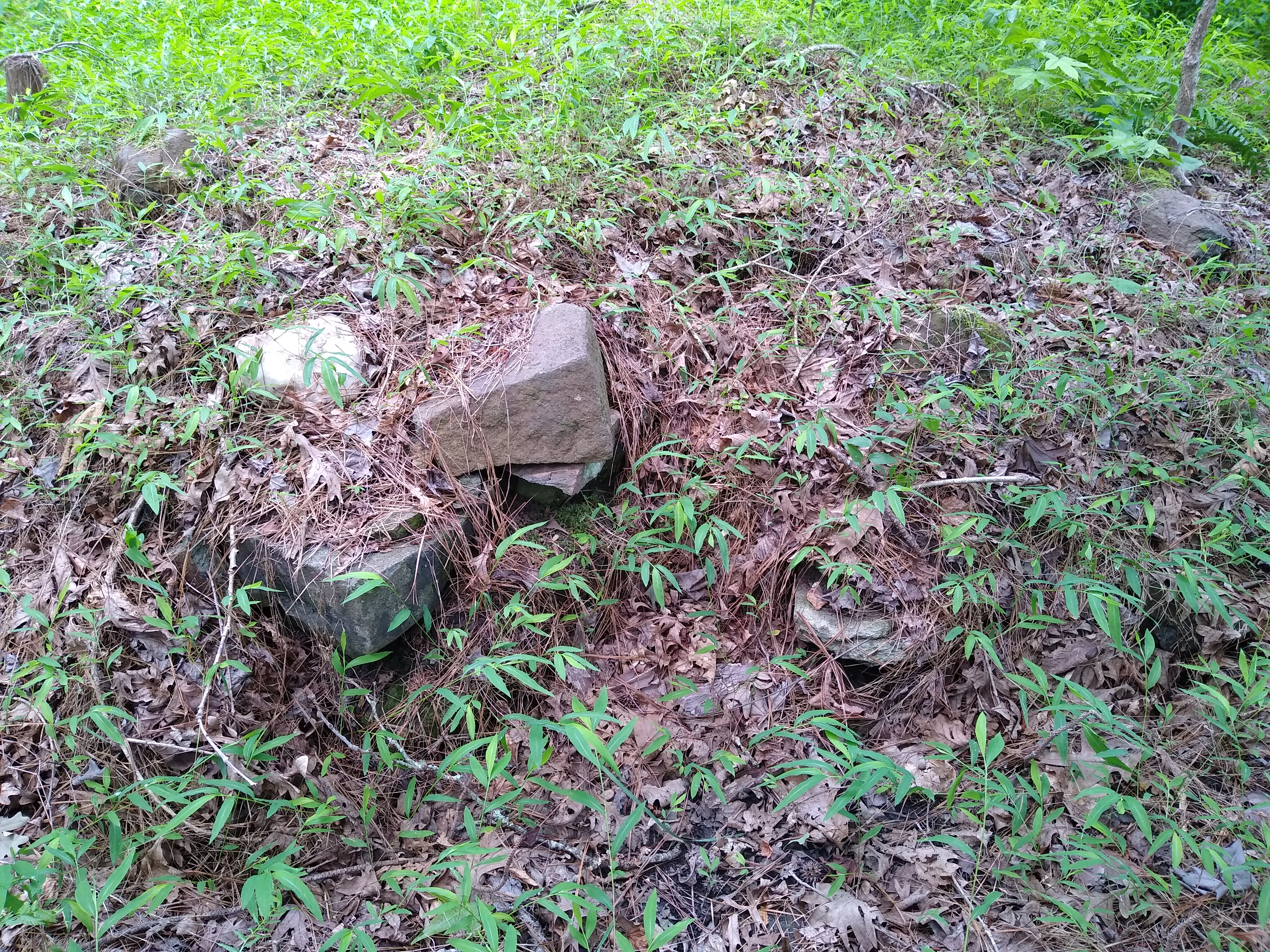

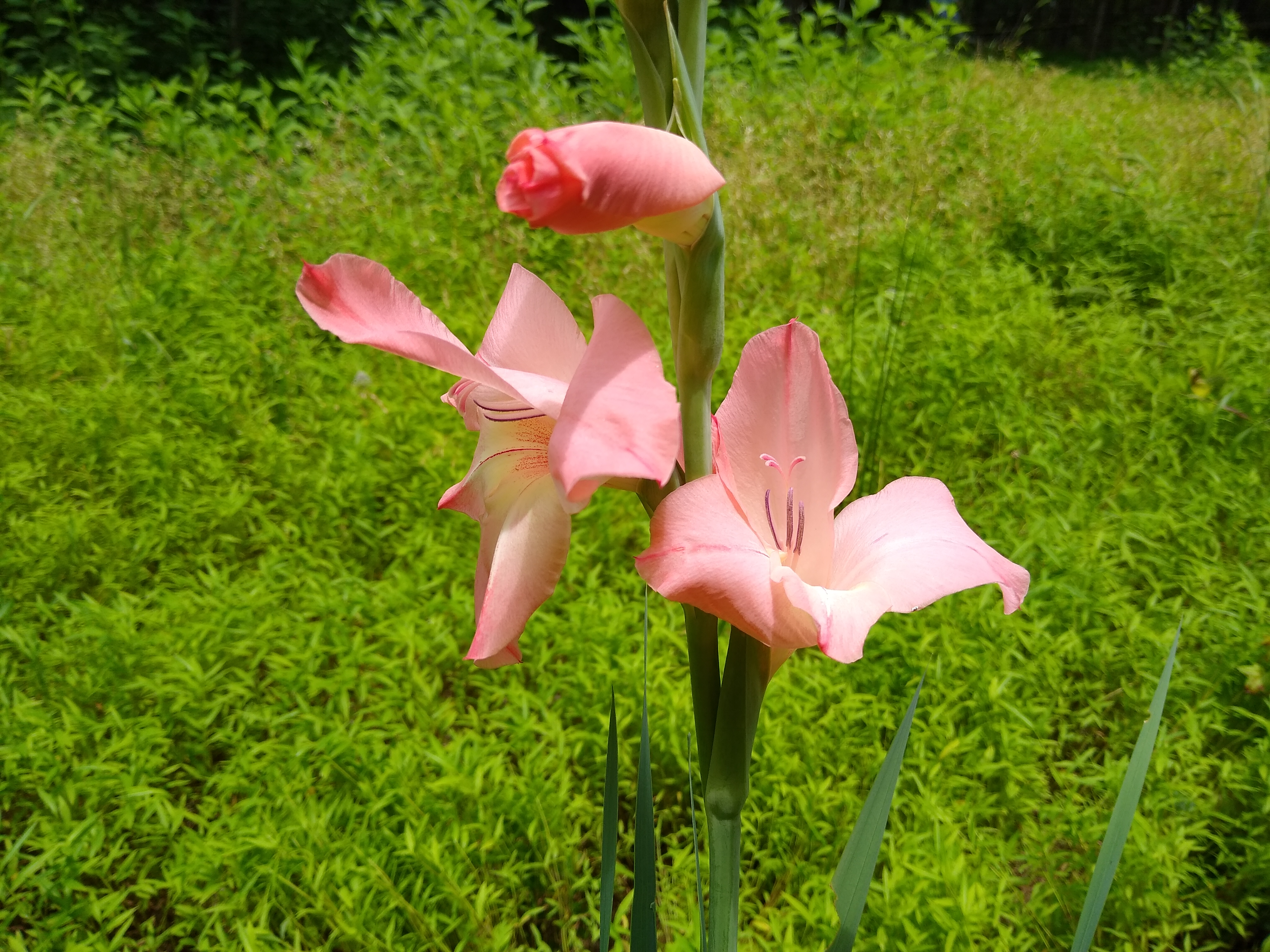

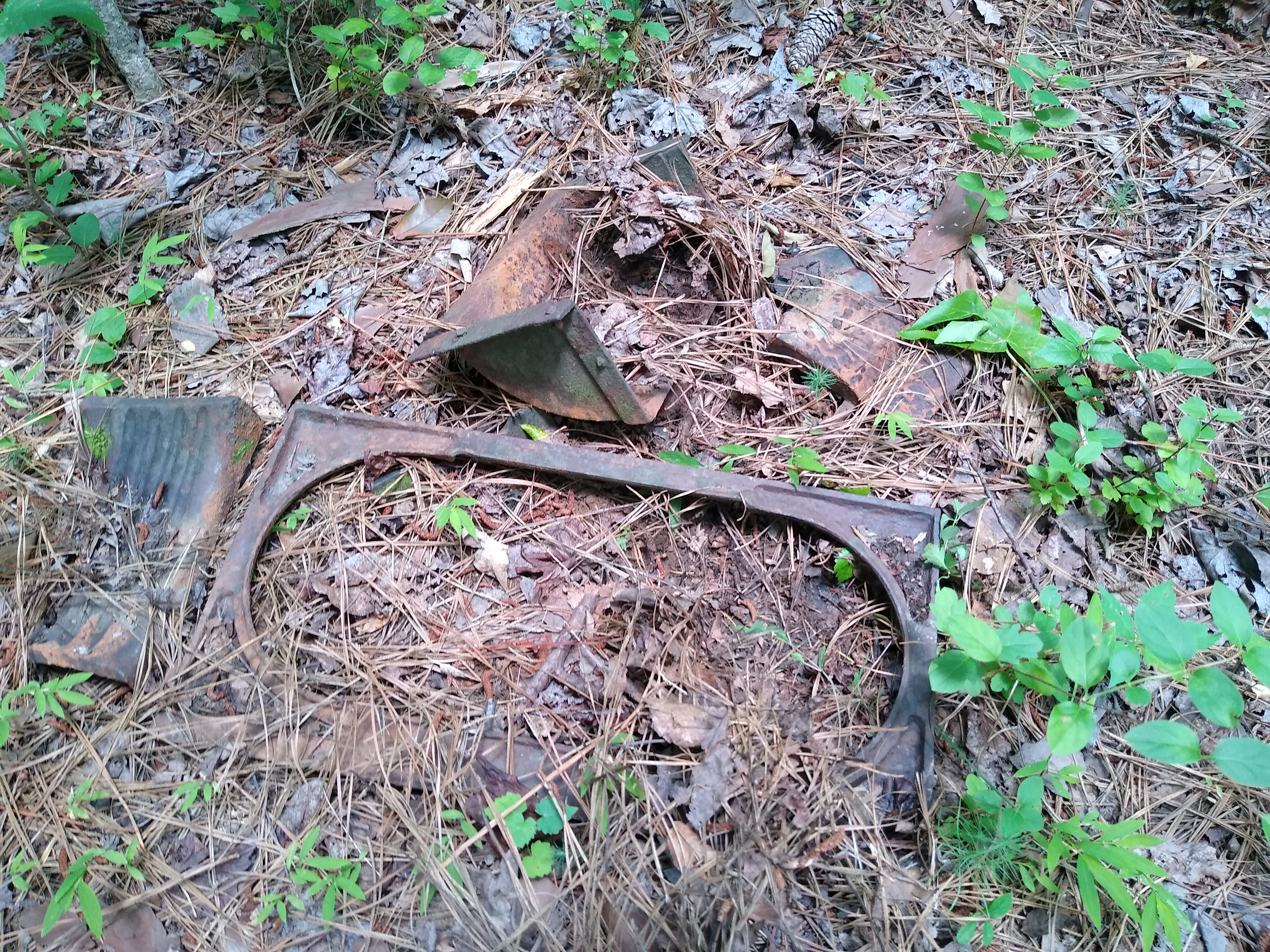
