= Rocky Ridge Farm Historic District =

Historic house in North Carolina, United States

- U.S. National Register of Historic Places
- U.S. Historic district
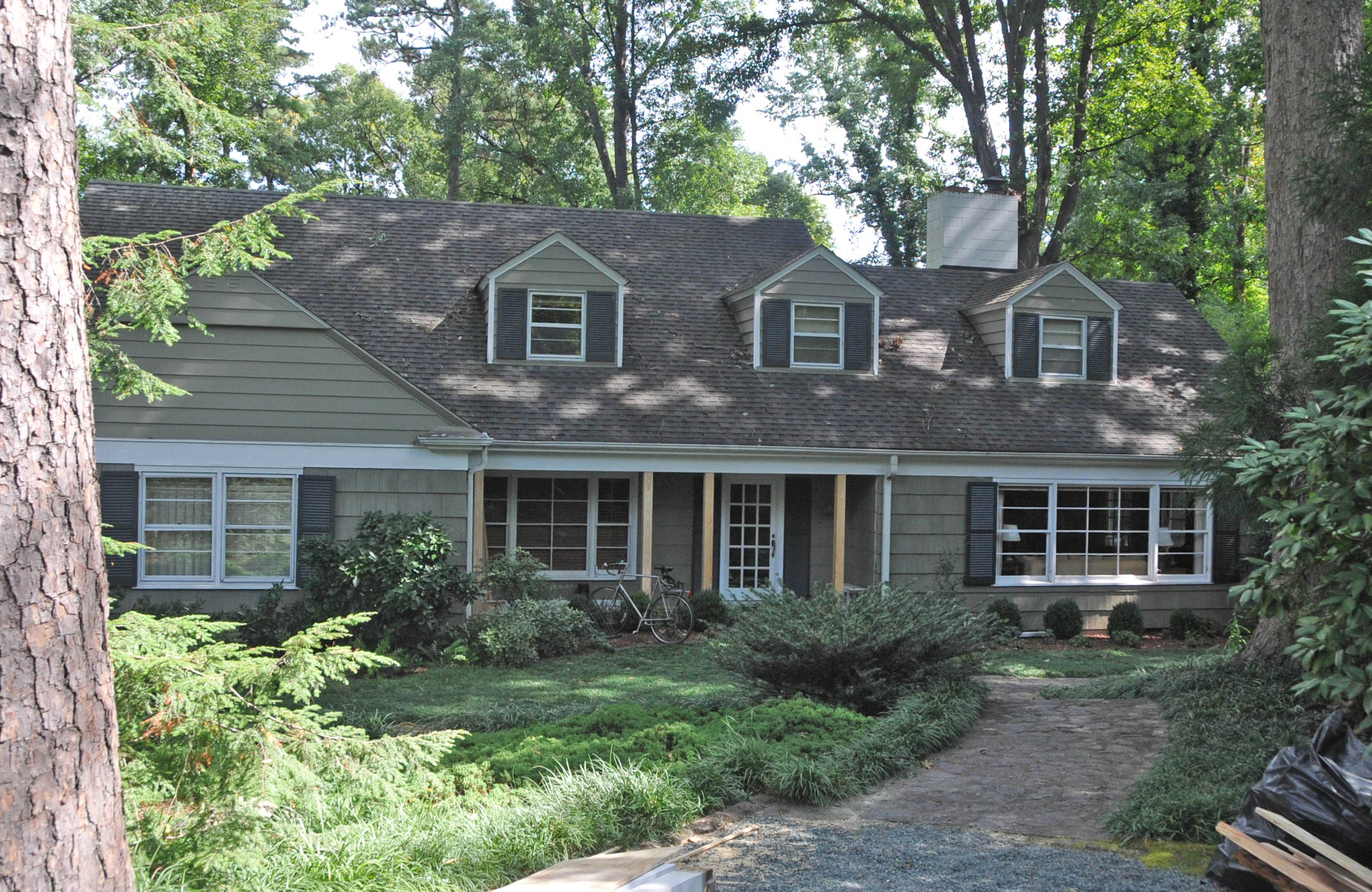
- Bernard and Thelma Boyd House (1954), March 2007

- Location within North Carolina Location within the United States
- Location: Roughly bounded by Rocky Ridge Rd., Country Club Rd., Laurel Hill Rd., Laurel Hill Cir., and Buttons Dr.; also portions of Country Club Rd., Laurel Hill Rd., and Ledge Ln., and all of Round Hill Rd. Chapel Hill, North Carolina
- Coordinates: 35°54′21″N 79°02′21″W
- Area: 570 acres (230 ha)
- Built: 1927
- Architect: Carr, George Watts; Sprinkle, William Van; Webb, James; Matsumoto, G.
- Architectural style: Colonial Revival, Tudor Revival, International Style, Ranch
- NRHP reference No.: 89001039, 07001501 (Boundary Increase)
- Added to NRHP: August 8, 1989, January 30, 2008 (Boundary Increase)

Rocky Ridge Farm Historic District is a national historic district located at Chapel Hill, Orange County, North Carolina. The district encompasses 51 contributing buildings, 3 contributing sites, and 5 contributing structures in a predominantly residential section of Chapel Hill. The district developed in two periods, 1928-1930 and 1936–1960, and includes notable examples of Colonial Revival, Tudor Revival, and International Style architecture.

It was listed on the National Register of Historic Places in 1989, with a boundary increase in 2008.
