= Durham–Orange Light Rail Transit =

Planned train line in North Carolina, US

Durham–Orange Light Rail Transit (DOLRT) was a planned 17.7-mile (28.5 km) light rail line in central North Carolina. It was intended to start operating in 2028 between North Carolina Central University (NCCU) in eastern Durham and the UNC Medical Center in Orange County. This line was being developed by regional transit agency GoTriangle, and was in the engineering phase of the federal grant approval process when it was discontinued.

== History ==
Chapel Hill and Durham are the home to major academic institutions and employers in the healthcare and service industries, and are the geographically closer of three cities in the Research Triangle region. Due to increasing traffic and development around the area, local governments and regional organizations conducted multiple studies to preserve and expand mobility between the two cities.

=== 1986–2009: Major Investment Study ===
While the Research Triangle Park's birth in the 1950s and regional events like the 1987 Olympics Festival began to culturally unify the Triangle as a single metropolitan area, it still lacked a regional, integrated network of infrastructure in fields such as public transportation in the mid-late 20th century. A study from UNC-Chapel Hill first addressed this demand in June 1987, arguing for local governments to proactively implement strategies for land use and mobility instead of reacting to changing transportation patterns. The report recommended Triangle governments to:

- strategize land use patterns as a region by preserving rights-of-way;
- proactively designing master plans through a regional transit agency, and;
- creating a fixed-guide transit system once denser development is available.

In response, the North Carolina General Assembly chartered GoTriangle (then branded as the Triangle Transit Authority, or TTA) in 1989 and charged it with developing a regional transit plan for the Triangle.

Chapel Hill, Durham, private landowners, and the state department of transportation drafted a "corridor master plan" from 1993 to 1994, and identified "areas of congestion and methods to improve mobility" between the two cities. Using this conclusion, TTA continued to identify transit management methods and potential environmental impacts in developing the corridor, and held workshops with UNC and Duke University on those topics. These efforts culminated with TTA formally identifying "a need for rail or bus transit fixed guideway between Durham and Chapel Hill" in its 2001 Major Investment Study (MIS). The first and second phases of the MIS considered the Durham-Chapel Hill connection as an expansion of the Raleigh-Durham regional rail project, and together compared the following options:

- a no-build alternative (i.e. control group)
- transportation system demand management (i.e. optimizing existing bus services)
- extending diesel train (DMU) service from the Raleigh-Durham project
- upgrading the arterial US-15/501 into a freeway
- adding HOV lanes to US-15/501
- bus rapid transit (BRT), then termed as an "exclusive busway"
- busway/mixed traffic (a hybrid of BRT and bus operations in roads)
- light rail transit (LRT)

The MIS recommended that Durham and Chapel Hill be connected by a new fixed-route transit corridor. However, the report cited concerns that "assumptions [in its ridership projection models] may have overprojected" ridership and cost performance estimates, and recommended further studies before identifying a specific transit technology for the corridor. Despite this, Durham and Orange counties adopted and integrated the MIS recommendations into its transit and regional development plans.

TTA moved forward with conducting environmental studies for the Raleigh-Durham segment of its regional rail concept, with the intent of funding it through a three-step grant program by the Federal Transit Administration (FTA) and kickstarting studies on the Durham-Chapel Hill section. However, TTA failed to provide adequate rider and financial projections of its proposed system, a requirement in the grant program, resulting in a "low" overall project rating. Rather than addressing the FTA's concerns to continue the development process, TTA withdrew its regional rail proposal from the New Starts program in August 2006.

=== 2007–2014: transit referendum and BRT proposal ===
Following the results of the regional rail study, TTA (then rebranded to Triangle Transit) revised its strategies on transit planning by establishing a Special Transit Advisory Commission in 2007.

On August 27, 2009, the North Carolina General Assembly passed a bill to allow local governments to fund local transit projects through a 1/2-cent sales tax increase; the Orange and Durham counties passed the tax increases by referendums in 2011 and 2012, allowing for new transit improvements to be partially self-funded.

The alternatives analysis (AA), the first required step in planning and developing an FTA-funded project, once again compared light rail, BRT, and transportation system management with updated models and development assumptions. The AA imposed that the following requirements be fulfilled to identify the best option for an improved Durham-Chapel Hill connection:

- Improve mobility through and within the Durham/Chapel Hill corridor
- Increase transit efficiency and quality of service
- Improve transit connections
- Support local/regional economic development and planned growth management initiatives
- Foster environmental stewardship
- Provide cost-effective transit investment

The resulting report found that light rail and BRT, both of which would share roughly similar routes, equally meet the mobility and environmental stewardship demands posed by the AA. However, BRT performed worse than light rail in "supporting compact development and economic growth, travel time savings, and the cost effectiveness of expanding long-term transit capacity". Furthermore, BRT would have required Triangle Transit to acquire additional private property for required road widening, as well to avoid right-of-way conflicts with nearby freight rail operators. Representatives from North Carolina Railroad, CSX, and Norfolk Southern, commented that they "would not accept the operation of busway/HOV lanes in any railroad corridor in which they operated" unlike for light rail. While the AA noted BRT's lower construction cost with respect to light rail, comparisons to existing BRT systems such as the South Busway in Pittsburgh or Cleveland's HealthLine failed to demonstrate "public support and a proven record of producing local and regional economic development benefits by enhancing and focusing growth". Recommended with light rail over BRT on the grounds of improved operational costs, development opportunities, and perceived ridership, Triangle Transit finalized its locally-preferred alternative (LPA) of light rail in April 2012.

The LPA also considered interlining existing bus services (i.e. running GoDurham and Chapel Hill Transit buses partly in the same route as BRT or light rail) and comparing its performance to a non-interlined service. While this scenario resulted in ridership estimates for BRT that were similar to light rail, the LPA noted that estimates "do not account for passengers that would transfer from feeder buses to BRT if the feeder buses were not sharing the BRT guideway". Given these considerations as well as difficulties in safety, logistics, and design expressed by Triangle Transit, interlining was eventually dropped as a possible design feature.

With the alternatives study accepted by the FTA, Triangle Transit continued with scoping studies to formally outline the need and environmental constraints of its light rail proposal. The further studies culminated in an environment impact statement and record of decision, which was approved in 2016.

=== 2019: Discontinuation ===
On March 27, 2019, the GoTriangle board of trustees voted to discontinue the project. Board members stated that it had become impossible to meet increased expenses and address difficulty acquiring right of way along Duke University's campus by deadlines set in state law. The final cost of planning the cancelled project amounted to $157 million.

In the wake of the cancelled project, GoTriangle began studying the possibility of initiating a commuter rail service using existing rail corridors.

== Proposed route ==
The proposed route would have connected downtown Chapel Hill with western and downtown Durham.

The route started just south of UNC Hospitals, and continued east past the Dean Smith Center towards the Meadowmont neighborhood of Chapel Hill. It would then pass through Leigh Village, a planned transit-oriented development, and run parallel alongside the region's major commuting pathways of I-40 and US-15/501.

DOLRT's proposed route continued northwards through the medical campus of Duke University, then ran parallel to the North Carolina Railroad alignment through the Ninth Street shopping district, and the Brightleaf, American Tobacco, and downtown Durham historic districts. Finally, the route continued through the historic Hayti "Black Wall Street" business district before terminating at North Carolina Central University.

The line was projected to begin construction in 2020 and be completed by 2028. End-to-end travel time would have been 42–44 minutes.

=== Carrboro extension ===
Orange County's transit plan also included a provision to study the idea to extend light rail westward to the neighboring town of Carrboro between 2035 and 2045. However, this was contingent on further studies and the repeal of transit funding restrictions imposed by the General Assembly.

== Project development ==
The original project was estimated at $1.4 billion (in 2011) with 25% from local taxpayers, 25% from the state, and 50% from the Federal government. The final project was estimated to cost $2.5 billion (year of expenditure) with 40% from local taxpayers, 10% from the state, and 50% from the Federal government — or $141 million per mile with an annual operating cost of $28.7 million. As of April 2018, the maximum available state funding was $183 million (or approximately 7.3% of the total estimate).

A final environmental impact statement was released by GoTriangle in February 2016, projecting 23,020 daily trips in 2040. The plan was amended to extend to NCCU in November 2016, projecting 26,880 daily trips in 2040.

== Proposed stations ==
The line would have had 18 stations (4 stations in Orange County, 14 stations in Durham County), with an additional station proposed in downtown Durham. These stations are as follows.

- UNC Hospital
- Mason Farm Road
- Hamilton Road
- Friday Center Drive
- Woodmont
- Leigh Village
- Gateway
- Patterson Place
- Martin Luther King Jr. Parkway
- South Square
- LaSalle Street
- Duke / VA Medical Center
- Ninth Street
- Buchanan Boulevard
- Durham station
- Blackwell/Mangum (proposed)
- Dillard Street
- Alston Avenue
- NCCU

== Controversies ==
=== Strategic disagreements ===
Public comments about DOLRT often focus on the limited scope of the project, especially how it would not extend to Research Triangle Park or Raleigh-Durham International Airport. While a 2007 analysis by the Special Transit Advisory Commission acknowledged that an airport rail link is a valid need that GoTriangle also envisions, a joint study with the airport found that "final decisions on a specific alignment" would be "premature" without a separate study.

=== Cost uncertainty ===
Due to the shifting scope of the project and GoTriangle's access to funding sources, cost estimates for planning and constructing the Durham-Orange light rail regularly changed.

==== General Assembly intervention ====
On September 14, 2015, the North Carolina General Assembly released a budget amendment that capped the maximum funding for regional transit projects to $500,000.

==== Downtown Durham right-of-way ====
Michael Goodmon, vice president of real estate for the local media conglomerate Capitol Broadcasting Company, and Brad Brinegar, chairman of the McKinney advertising agency, resigned from their board positions in GoTriangle's fundraising arm in November 2018. Goodmon was the chairman of GoTransit Partners prior to his resignation.

=== Construction of a Rail Operation and Maintenance Facility ===
The locally-preferred alternative of light rail in 2012 included provisions for potential locations for a maintenance center, which included one near Farrington Road in southwest Durham. While this location was selected due to it being the cheapest option and causing the least environmental and noise impacts, it also required the displacement of six homes and rezoning.

=== Objections by Duke University ===
Vincent Price, the president of Duke University, appointed the school's executive vice president Dr. Tallman Trask III as its point of contact in November 2018. Trask was charged with the "sole authority to provide information and make decisions on all operational issues" in addressing Duke's concerns on patient and ambulance access to hospital facilities, traffic pattern changes near the American Tobacco campus, and operational interruptions from construction.

In response to these concerns, GoTriangle released a report on the potential of electromagnetic interference by light rail on medical and scientific instruments, as well as potential strategies for its mitigation. Furthermore, GoTriangle also developed additional design changes to maintain power and ambulance access, address and closely monitor noise and vibration from construction, and prevent special event traffic from being obstructed by light rail.

Despite extensive negotiations and accommodations, Duke ultimately declined to sign a cooperative agreement on February 27, 2019. Duke previously had helped kill off an earlier rail project in the 1990s connecting Raleigh to Durham via a diesel self-contained DMU vehicle. Duke officials noted that the proposed route would go through the heart of Duke's medical facilities. They contended that the level of vibration caused by construction, as well as electromagnetic interference from trains, posed an unacceptable risk to the medical facilities. This was despite similar light rail projects being successful at medical facilities in Houston and Minneapolis. At the last minute, Duke also demanded an unprecedented $2 billion liability policy from GoTriangle for insurance in the event of a major incident on the line, making any reasonable agreement impossible. Local community members and elected representatives voiced disapproval and accusations of poor faith in response, including a suggestion by Durham city council member Mark-Anthony Middleton to invoke eminent domain.
