= Walter R. Davis =

Texas oil tycoon and philanthropist

Walter Royal Davis (January 11, 1920 – May 19, 2008) was a Texas oil tycoon and philanthropist originally from Elizabeth City, North Carolina. He was also an influential figure in state politics and higher education. Davis Library, the main library at the University of North Carolina at Chapel Hill since it opened in 1984, is named for him, he having been a trustee at the university for 16 years. He died at his home in Chapel Hill, North Carolina, at the age of 88. He also had a home in Midland, Texas.

== Early life ==
Davis was born in Pasquotank County in poor, rural northeastern North Carolina, the youngest of seven children of modest farming parents. He graduated from Hargrave Military Academy in 1938. He supported himself with jobs in Elizabeth City, North Carolina, Roanoke, Virginia, and as a truck driver in California, eventually joining management at a trucking firm.

== Businessman ==
In 1952, he moved to Texas, where he borrowed $1,000 to buy five trucks that could carry crude oil from wells in the Permian Basin to distant refineries. By the 1960s, this investment had grown into the Permian Corporation, a multimillion-dollar business and the world's largest independent petroleum transport company, with 1,100 employees, a tractor-trailer fleet of 550 vehicles and a strong presence in 15 oil states. After selling his company to Occidental Petroleum in 1966, Davis became the top executive after CEO Armand Hammer, helping lead Occidental as the company developed the first oil wells in the Middle East. Davis broke with Hammer and started a second oil transport company, bought refineries, and invested in oil and gas drilling ventures and other businesses. He also invested in real-estate projects in his home state, including Kildaire Farms in Cary, North Carolina, and Bald Head Island and Southern Shores along the N.C. coast. Permian was later sold to National Intergroup, a holding company created by National Steel Corporation, in 1985. Six years later, in 1991, it was bought by Ashland Inc. in a deal valued at $250 million and merged with Scurlock Oil Company to create a subsidiary company known as Scurlock Permian Corporation. Ashland agreed to sell Scurlock Permian to Plains All American Pipeline in 1999.

== Philanthropist ==
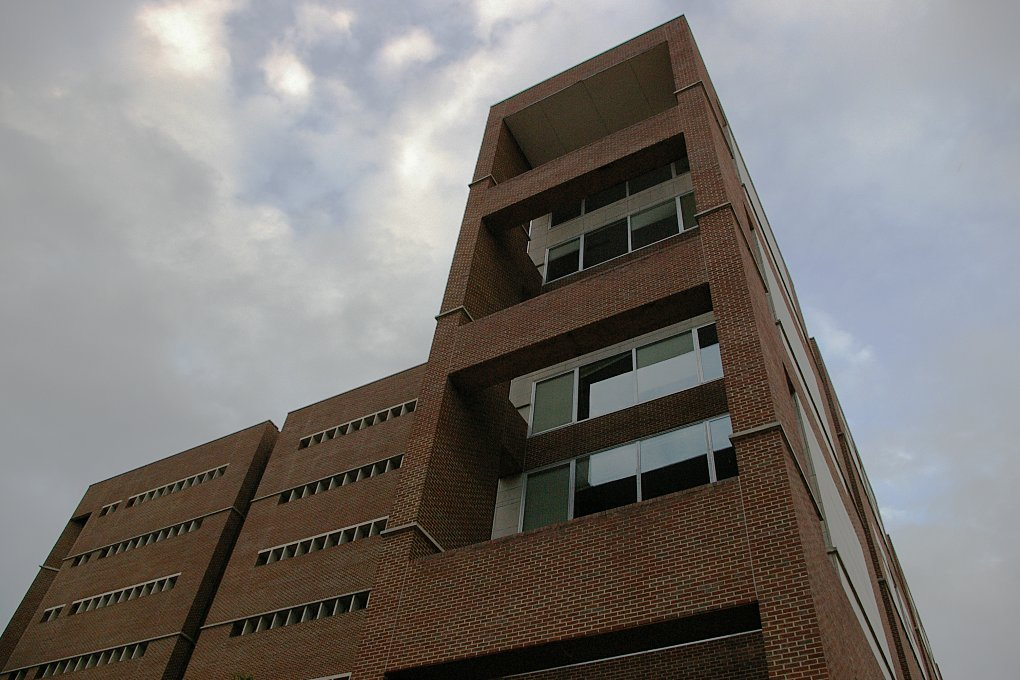
Walter Royal Davis Library at UNC-Chapel Hill

Despite finding his tremendous success elsewhere, Davis never forgot the state of his birth, to which he returned in the 1970s. He became a great benefactor to North Carolina's environment and its institutions. An unlettered man himself, but always aware of the power of education, he rose to the rank of trustee at UNC-Chapel Hill, a post he held for 16 years, two of them as chairman of the board. During this time he shared his hard-earned wealth in a number of ways, including establishing scholarships and helping the less advantaged earn degrees. It was also during this time, in the 1970s, that he successfully fought to claim $32 million in funds from the state legislature from the sale of the university's utilities. It is from these funds that Davis Library became a reality, as well as renovations to Wilson Library and the Health Sciences Library. His many gifts have provided funds for students, faculty, campus buildings, research and strategic initiatives such as the Davis Oral History Fund supporting scholarly works in the Southern Oral History Program, a component of the Center for the Study of the American South. Davis said that the reason he worked so hard to provide higher education opportunities to others was that he never had that opportunity.

Davis was also a major donor to the Dean Smith Center, which opened in 1986 and is still the home court of the UNC-Chapel Hill men's basketball team, and a scholarship program for students who agreed to teach in poor counties in northeastern North Carolina. In 1999 during a trustee meeting, then UNC-Chapel Hill student body president Nic Heinke asked his fellow board members to give a donation to Hurricane Floyd relief efforts. Heinke passed around his baseball cap and came up with $400 in donations from trustees. When the hat got to Davis, he dropped in a check for $100,000. Then at age 79, Davis had to ask a fellow trustee to fill out the check because his eyesight was poor. He asked that the money go to displaced students at hard-hit East Carolina University in Greenville, North Carolina.

In the spring of 1999, Reyna Walters, student body president at UNC-Chapel Hill, chatted with Davis about her plan to earn money over the summer for a trip to Europe. He said he would make the trip happen, and soon after, a $10,000 check for Walters arrived from Davis. He was also known to leave five-thousand-dollar tips for struggling clerks and waitresses.

== Honors ==
In 1994, Walter Davis was awarded the Distinguished Service Medal from the General Alumni Association of UNC-Chapel Hill. He has also been awarded the William Richardson Davie Award from the UNC-Chapel Hill board of trustees, and in 2004 was the inaugural recipient of the Light on the Hill Award. Davis also served on the Duke University board of trustees, and was a member of the University of North Carolina board of governors for 10 years.
