= Emerson Waldorf School =

Waldorf school in Chapel Hill, North Carolina, US

Coordinates: 35°59′16″N 79°04′44″W

The Emerson Waldorf School, founded in 1984, is a Pre-K to Grade 12 Waldorf school with about 260 enrolled students. The 54-acre (0.22 km^{2}) campus is located in Chapel Hill, North Carolina. The school offers a curriculum based on the philosophical and pedagogical indications of Rudolf Steiner, designed to promote interdisciplinary and multi-sensory learning. The school celebrated its twenty-fifth anniversary in 2009.

== Curriculum ==
While the Waldorf curriculum contains a traditional academic focus, there are a number of distinctive aspects to the education:

- A classical humanities curriculum begins in second and third grade with mythology and legends and takes the children from Greece and Rome- through medieval history, the Renaissance, the Reformation, the Age of Exploration, up to the present day. The High School curriculum includes English literature (mythology, comedy and tragedy, the Odyssey, poetry, Shakespeare, Parzival, Dante, Faust and Transcendentalism), class plays, history (revolutions, ancient history, history through art, medieval history, ancient Asia, history through film, history through music, history through architecture, history since 1945). In January 2009, the Grade 11 class attended the presidential inauguration in Washington, DC.
- Mathematics in the High School includes algebra, geometry, trigonometry, probability, projective geometry, pre-calculus and calculus.
- The sciences include the biological sciences (botany, biology, anatomy, embryology and zoology), chemistry (inorganic and organic chemistry, acids bases and salts, chemistry of the elements and atomic theory), physics (sound, mechanics, thermodynamics, kinetics, electromagnetism and optics), and the earth sciences (meteorology, astronomy, geology, environmental science). The sciences are taught phenomenologically and experientially.
- Spanish is taught beginning in the first grade.
- The arts - Drama, painting, drawing, music, practical arts and modeling are integrated into the academic curriculum, including mathematics and the sciences. Practical arts include clay modeling, woodworking, copper-smithing and blacksmithing. Handwork includes knitting, crochet, sewing and embroidery in the Lower School and, in the High School, includes book-binding, basketry and weaving. Extracurricular activities in the High School include marionette construction and performances.
- The class teacher takes the same class of children through the elementary and middle school grades, teaching all the main subjects. In the High School, the subjects are taught by teachers who specialize in that subject area.
- Textbooks are generally not used in the elementary and middle school grades. Instead, the teacher creates the presentation and the children make their individual books for each subject taught, recording and illustrating the lessons.
- Athletics - Physical education is taught throughout the grades. The sports offered in the High School include: Fall (co-ed soccer, boys/girls cross-country), Winter (boys/girls basketball), Spring (ultimate Frisbee.). The High School is a Charter Member of the Central Carolina Athletic League, which was founded in September 2006. The High School competes in end of season conference tournaments for co-ed soccer, boys basketball and co-ed ultimate frisbee.

== Celebrations and festivals ==
The School holds a "Rose Ceremony" at the beginning of the school year to welcome first graders to the Lower School. Various festivals are held each year, including Michaelmas, Martinmas Lantern Walk, the Spiral of Light, Santa Lucia, and a May Day celebration. In addition, festivals from other cultures are arranged from time to time, such as Las Posadas. The School also hosts two community-wide celebrations, a Holiday Fair in November–December and a May Faire.

== School policies ==
- Governance - Instead of a principal or headmaster, the school is governed by three bodies: the College of Teachers is responsible for all teaching and curriculum, the Board of Directors provides legal and financial oversight, and the administration manages enrollment and financial operations.
- Media - The school generally discourages the watching of television and similar media and use of electronic games. Computer use is introduced in the high school.
- Tuition Assistance is offered on the philosophy that every family should have the financial option of sending their children to the school.
