= Murals of Chapel Hill =

Murals in Chapel Hill, North Carolina

Chapel Hill, North Carolina, in the United States, has more than 30 distinctive murals, most by University of North Carolina at Chapel Hill alumnus Michael Brown.

The murals have been funded by the town and county governments, as well as by local businesses. Some, like the mural Dogwoods, which adorns the exterior wall of the Orange County Visitor Center, have been commissioned directly by the town of Chapel Hill, and others have been painted on private property with the town's permission. Many of Brown's early murals, including his first, Blue Mural, were painted as part of an annual local arts event that ran continuously until 2001. The event relied on the assistance of student volunteers who helped Brown paint the murals, turning them into collaborative community arts projects.

Brown's latest complete mural, Ramses, resides on the inside of UNC's Student Stores. He is also currently working on an as yet untitled mural that will decorate the side of the new Mellow Mushroom restaurant that is set to open on Franklin street. Painting should continue through December 2012.

Besides Brown, artists such as Loren Pease (Sweetpease Art), David Wilson, Scott Nurkin and Casey Robertson have contributed to the Chapel Hill area's outdoor art. Several collaborative murals have been painted exclusively by local volunteers, and other projects have used volunteer efforts to complete designs by professional artists. Although Brown is not the first or only artist to contribute to the public murals of downtown Chapel Hill, his prolific work has helped characterize the town's appearance and begun a trend of local community involvement with mural painting.

== Early murals ==
=== Laying the Cornerstone of Old East ===
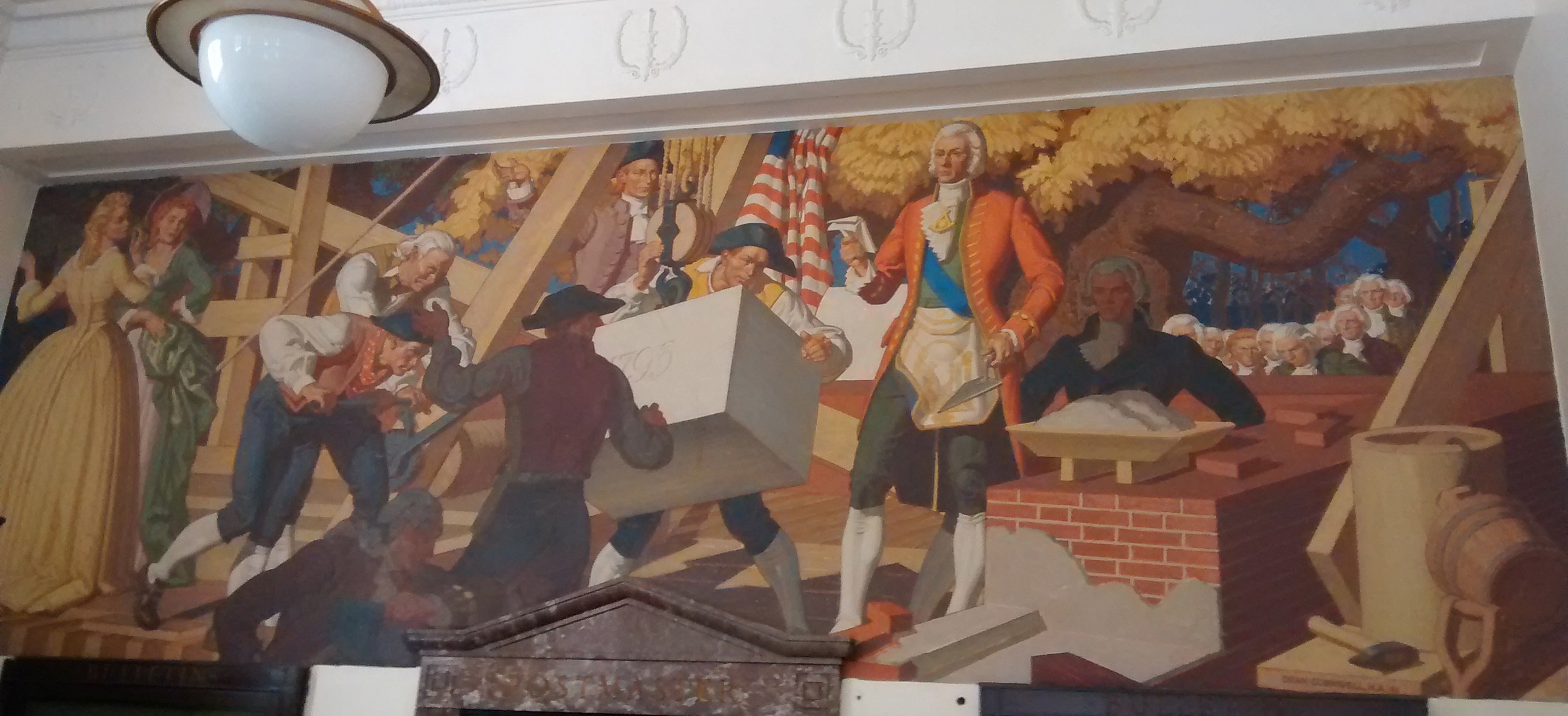
Laying the Cornerstone of Old East.

In 1941, commercial artist Dean Cornwell painted the earliest public mural still currently visible in Chapel Hill. It depicts William Richardson Davie laying the cornerstone of Old East, the first building constructed on the campus of the University of North Carolina at Chapel Hill. It can be seen on an interior wall of the Chapel Hill Post Office.

Although Cornwell's artwork proves that murals existed in Chapel Hill before Michael Brown began painting, the beginning of the town's outdoor mural tradition is attributed to him. In 1993, Brown painted a companion mural on another interior wall of the building, titled The Auctioning of the Lots. It was completed for the town's bicentennial and follows the style of Cornwell's piece.

=== Blue Mural ===
Michael's Brown's first mural in Chapel, the Blue Mural features a night-time cityscape of Chapel Hill and was completed in 1989. It can be viewed from a public parking lot on the corner of Rosemary Street and North Columbia Street and is based on Brown's memories of Franklin Street's appearance when he worked as a dishwasher at Ye Olde Waffle Shop.

Brown had graduated from the art department at UNC-Chapel Hill in 1977 and was looking for work as an artist when the opportunity emerged to complete a project for the Downtown Commission in Chapel Hill. Although Brown had some experience painting houses and had worked on mural projects in his youth, Blue Mural turned out to be the project that established his reputation in Chapel Hill and led to subsequent requests for murals in the area at a rate of about one per year.

Since the Downtown Commission and the Chapel Hill-Carrboro School System co-sponsored the mural, Brown was required to work with young student volunteers on the project. Brown has stated that he chose a pointillist style for the mural because he thought the technique might help unify the contributions of volunteers who had little experience painting. Brown also typically starts his murals by painting the background color and a grid, then filling in the grid from a planned drawing, a method that can make it easier to communicate his design to volunteers and to supervise the project. The annual collaboration quickly became a spring tradition in Chapel Hill, with the last mural, Paint by Numbers completed in 2003.

=== Hands ===
Brown's second mural, Hands, was completed in 1990 with help from 20 local students, 50 passers-by and one UNC basketball player. It features several large handprint shapes that have been filled in with the participants' actual handprints and adorns an exterior wall of the Chapel Hill Cleaner's building on Franklin Street. Since the mural was once again co-sponsored by the Downtown Commission and Chapel Hill-Carrboro School System and involved local volunteers, the handprinting technique became a clever solution for the problem of uniting their contributions into a single artwork.

According to Brown, the large Carolina blue handprints were inspired by a student tradition for celebrating basketball victories at UNC. "I was struggling for an idea when an old childhood memory came to me," Brown said. "I used to enjoy walking past Sloan's Drug Store because you could still see some faded Carolina blue hand prints put there by students after Carolina's 1957 National Championship win."

The 14 by 50 foot mural is in poor shape and is a candidate for the Painted Walls Project.

== Popular murals ==
Though Brown has been painting murals in Chapel Hill for more than 20 years, a few pieces of his work remain iconic. Many of Brown's most famous works are up for restoration as part of the Painted Walls Project.

=== Sea Turtles ===
Sea Turtles, originally painted in 1993 and restored in 2011, was painted at the intersection of North Columbia Street and East Rosemary Street. on the side of a parking deck. Brown originally wanted to feature dinosaurs but the Chapel Hill Design Review Board rejected the idea. Instead of dinosaurs, Brown adorned the 30 by 70 foot mural with another prehistoric animal.

"First, in my youth, I used to keep pet turtles, sometimes dozens at a time," Brown said. "Another reason was that one of my elementary school teachers back in 1963 told me that during the age of the dinosaurs we here in Chapel Hill were under water. As a kid I enjoyed walking around uptown and imagining dinosaurs swimming past the planetarium. Maybe one still lived, I thought, in the UNC steam tunnels."

In order to restore the mural, a local artist painted Pets in 2011 to raise money.

=== Pencil ===
Brown originally wanted to paint a 100 foot long chameleon, but when Chapel Hill's Appearance Commission rejected the idea as too scary and inappropriate, he settled on a 140-foot pencil.

"They thought it might frighten children," Brown said. "They also felt it was an undignified image to have so close to a church."

The mural, painted on a wall on the side of Henderson Street in pop art style, features the words "is mightier than the sword" upside down to prevent it from being considered a billboard by the Appearance Commission. The mural was originally painted in 1991 and restored in 2007. Brown said the idea came to him by accident.

"Irritated with (the Appearance Commission), I went back to the drawing board, but nothing seemed to be working," Brown said. "I threw down my pencil in disgust. It rolled across the table and stopped on the plans."

=== Paint by Numbers ===
Sometimes known as Pantana Bob's for the name of the restaurant on which this mural is located, Paint by Numbers is the last mural Brown painted as part of the annual Mural Project supported by the Downtown Commission. He envisioned the 2003 mural as an homage to those who had helped him over the course of his work.

"These 'painted painters' are about halfway through their project, so the mural becomes a painting about making a painting," Brown said. "I think it is a nice tribute to all the school kids who have helped me each spring for 18 years."

When the Downtown Commission reformed to become the Downtown Partnership, the yearly project stopped.

"I must have somehow sensed that this might be the last mural," Brown said. "The painted painters will never finish their mural, and I didn't want my program to be finished either."

== Painted Walls Project ==
The Painted Walls Project is an ongoing effort to restore and preserve damaged murals in downtown Chapel Hill. The town government had expressed interest in repairing certain murals as early as 1995, allocating $2,065 to Michael Brown for the purpose of "Downtown Mural Preservation" in the summer of that year. The Painted Walls Project, however, represents a more concentrated effort to bring together various groups with an interest in preserving the murals that have become characteristic of downtown Chapel Hill. In the summer of 2008, the Chapel Hill Historical Society, Preservation Society of Chapel Hill, and the Chapel Hill Museum began collaboration on the Painted Walls Project. Since then, the project has successfully restored the murals Musical Youth, The Blue Mural, Porthole Alley, and Pencil. Other murals titled Hands, Wall Walkers, Pantana Bob's, The Postcards, Earth as Atoms, Comic Book, the Cave Paintings, Walt's Grill, and Puzzle Pieces have also been featured on the Chapel Hill Preservation Society website as murals in need of restoration. All restored murals and murals considered in need of preservation so far are Michael Brown's work.

In 2010, UNC-Chapel Hill's campus newspaper The Daily Tar Heel reported on the project, at that point citing The Chapel Hill Preservation Society and the Chapel Hill Downtown Partnership as the project's primary supporters. It also attested to the popularity of Michael Brown's murals as an integral piece of the atmosphere of downtown Chapel Hill, and therefore worthy of restoration.

In order to raise funds for the project, Sadie Rapp, then 14 years old, painted the mural Pets in 2011. It served as her eighth grade project at the Duke School, and she stated: "Part of the project involves doing research, so I studied the effects of public art on communities," Rapp said. "And in doing that, I saw an article in The Daily Tar Heel about Michael Brown and the Painted Walls Project. So I thought, 'Why not use my mural to help that one?'"

The mural contains 33 dogs and one cat. Residents could "adopt" the dogs for a $50 donation and Rapp auctioned off the cat for $110. It went on to raise $1,700. Michael Brown painted a small turtle on the Rapp's mural as a thank you.

Donations can be made by visiting the Painted Walls Project Page.

== Other artists ==
Other artists and organizations have made their marks on the Chapel Hill area's walls, though none so prolifically as Michael Brown.

Casey Robertson painted The Girl in 2010 at 104 West Main Street and Arrows at 709 West Rosemary Street in 2011. Both murals feature a street art style.

Scott Nurkin, who studied under Michael Brown from 2000 to 2004, assisted on many of Brown's murals. In October 2013 he completed the mural "1941 Curt Teich Postcard" located on the backside of the outdoor bar He's Not Here, which commemorates various landmarks on the campus of UNC. Additionally 8 more of his murals can be seen in the courtyard of that establishment. He completed "Carrboro Man" at 705 West Rosemary Street in June 2013. Many of his murals can also be seen in Chapel Hill establishments such as Syd's Hairshop, the Cave, Chapel Hill Underground, and Goodfella's Pub. The University of Chapel Hill recently purchased his NC Musicians Mural which formerly hung in the now defunct, Pepper's Pizza. The 18 paintings which comprised the mural now hang in the School of Music in Hill Hall on the University of North Carolina's campus.

David Wilson created five murals for the Hargraves Community Center in 2004. Each 7 by 14 foot panel outlines a specific portion of African-American history and accomplishment in Chapel Hill. Each of the large outdoor panels are digital enlargements of smaller painting that hang inside the center.

Emily Eve Weinstein painted the Strowd Roses Community Mural that decorates an exterior wall of the Jade Palace Restaurant on Franklin Street in 2009, two years after her original mural was painted over by vandals posing as property owners. Like many of Michael Brown's projects, the mural relied heavily on local student volunteers who helped complete Weinstein's design. It is named for the Strowed Roses Foundation, a local nonprofit organization that provided the grant funding the project, and the artwork depicts wild climbing roses.

Other muralists include David Sovero, Babatola Oguntoyinbo, Mary McCarthy, Scott Stewart, Jim Tuten, and Ryan Robidoux.

== List of murals by artist and date ==
Title	Artist	Year Painted
Laying the Cornerstone of Old East	Dean Cornwell	1941
The Blue Mural	Michael Brown	1989
Hands	Michael Brown	1990
Pencil	Michael Brown	1991
Gates of Beauty	Michael Brown	1992
The Cave	Michael Brown	1992
Trees and Seasons	Michael Brown	1992
Fishing Village	Scott Stewart	1993
Sea Turtles	Michael Brown	1993
Auctioning of the Lots	Michael Brown	1994
Marathon	Michael Brown	1994
Walking Up the Wall	Michael Brown	1996
Quilt Pattern	Michael Brown	1996
Parade of Humanity	Michael Brown	1997
Super Heroes	Michael Brown	1997
Carolina Car Wash	Babatola Oguntoyinbo	1998
Amber Alley	Michael Brown	1999
Democracy Express	Jim Tuten	1999
Jigsaw Puzzle	Michael Brown	1999
Arts Center	Michael Brown	2000
Chapel Hill Postcards	Michael Brown	2000
Franklin Street Scene	Earl Kluttz Thomson and Raines Thompson	2001
Musical Youth	Michael Brown	2001
Earth as Atoms	Michael Brown	2002
Paint by Numbers	Michael Brown	2003
Hargraves	David Wilson	2004
Nation of Many Colors	El Centro Latino Volunteers	2005
New York City Street Scene	Mary McCarthy	2005
Club Nova	Volunteers	2007
Dogwoods	Michael Brown	2009-2011
Strowd Roses Community Mural	Emily Eve Weinstein	2009
Pets	Sadie Rapp	2010
The Girl	Casey Robertson	2010
Wootini Gallery	Ryan Robidoux	2010
Arrows	Casey Robertson	2011
WCOM	David Sovero	2011
Ramses	Michael Brown	2012
Mellow Mushroom	Michael Brown	2013
Carrboro Man	Scott Nurkin	2013
1941 Curt Teich Postcard	Scott Nurkin	2013
