= Anna Forbes Liddell =

American academic and feminist

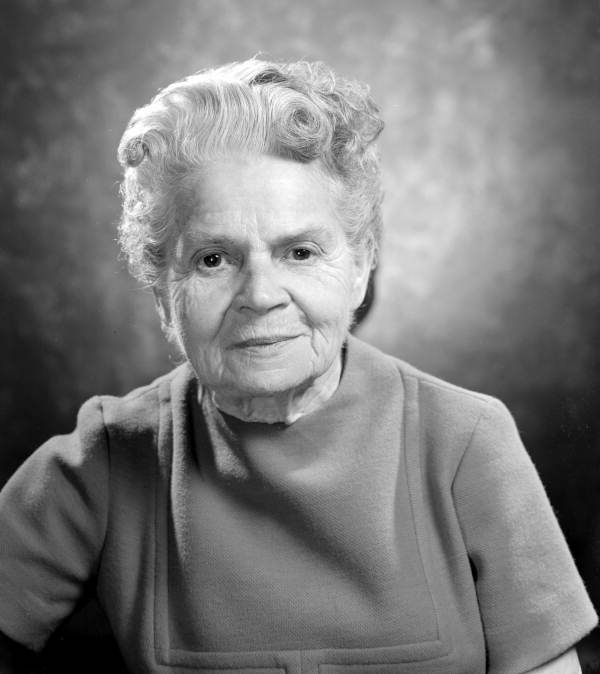
- Liddell in 1969
- Born: December 6, 1891; Charlotte, North Carolina
- Died: August 30, 1979 (aged 87)
- Education: Presbyterian Female College; University of Tennessee; Columbia University; University of North Carolina at Chapel Hill; Cornell University
- Occupations: Educator, Suffragist

Anna Forbes Liddell (December 6, 1891 – August 30, 1979) was an American academic and feminist, active in the suffrage movement in North Carolina as a young woman, and a Robert O. Lawton Distinguished Professor of Philosophy at Florida State University.

== Early life and education ==
Anna Forbes Liddell was born in Charlotte, North Carolina, the daughter of Walter Scott Liddell, a manufacturer, and Helen Sherman Ogden Liddell. She was a student at Queens University of Charlotte (then called Presbyterian Female College), then briefly at University of Tennessee and Columbia University as a young woman. In 1918, she completed undergraduate studies at the University of North Carolina at Chapel Hill, where she studied philosophy with Henry Horace Williams. In 1922, she earned a master's degree at Cornell University, and in 1924 she was one of the first two women to finish a Ph.D. at the University of North Carolina (the other was Irene Dillard Elliott). Her dissertation was titled "The Logical Relationship of the Philosophy of Hegel to the Philosophies of Spinoza and Kant." She pursued some post-doctoral education at the University of Heidelberg.

== Career ==
During her college years, Liddell wrote for magazines and newspapers, and worked in advertising and publishing. One of her articles, a short piece titled "Feminism," was published in Life magazine in the June 1914 issue. In 1913, Forbes Liddell and Susanne Bynum organized the North Carolina Equal Suffrage League. Between college and graduate school, she taught school in North Carolina.

After earning her Ph.D., Liddell was first on the faculty at Chowan College as a professor of social studies. In 1926, she began teaching at the Florida State College for Women, and stayed as it became Florida State University in 1947, until she retired in 1962. She headed the Department of Philosophy and Religion, and was selected as the Robert O. Lawton Distinguished Professor of the Year at Florida State, in 1959. She was the first Southern woman philosopher on the program at the International Congress of Philosophy when it was held in Prague in 1934. During her appearance at the Eighth International Congress of Philosophy, Liddell compared the topics of religion and philosophy. She was the first professor at her university to teach a course on closed circuit television. In 1932, she was elected president of the Southern Society of Philosophy and Psychology.

Throughout her career, Liddell wrote a variety of articles on ethics and philosophy. Several of her articles appeared in The Journal of Philosophy. Her piece “In Defense of Absolute Ethics” was published in the 1930 edition. A second piece by Liddell, titled “Communication: A Personal Tribute to Ernst Hoffman (1880-1952)”, was published in the 1952 edition. In addition to this, Liddell wrote several pieces for The Personalist. Her piece “The Relation of Philosophy to Religion,” was published in the 1936 edition. A second piece by Liddell, titled “Philosophical Mysticism and Modern Science”, was published in the 1951 edition.

In the 1970s, in her eighties and using a wheelchair, Liddell testified for the Equal Rights Amendment in the Florida House of Representatives.

== Personal life ==
Liddell died in 1979 at the age of 87. In recognition of her contributions to literature and education, a small collection of her personal papers, correspondence, and unpublished writings is preserved in the archives at Florida State University. These materials provide insight into her academic career, literary works, and involvement in early 20th-century literary circles. The archive remains a valuable resource for scholars researching women writers of the period and the cultural history of the American South.
