= Meadowmont, North Carolina =

Historic house in North Carolina, United States

- Meadowmont
- U.S. National Register of Historic Places
- U.S. Historic district
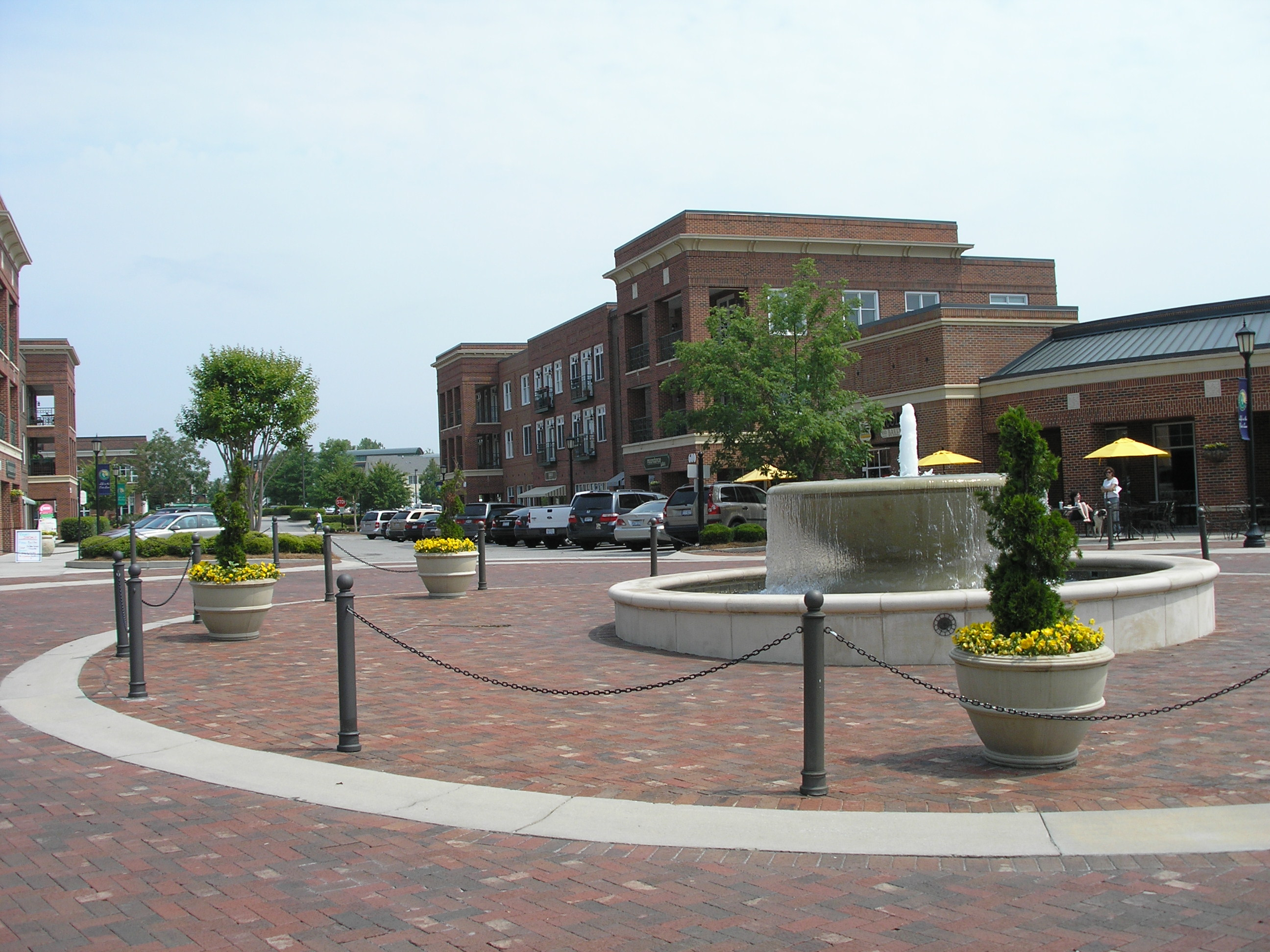

- Location within North Carolina Location within the United States
- Location: Off NC 54, near Chapel Hill, North Carolina
- Coordinates: 35°54′26″N 79°00′38″W
- Area: 435 acres (176 ha)
- Built: 1933
- Architect: Crisp and Edmunds; Kane, George W.
- Architectural style: Colonial Revival, Georgian Revival
- NRHP reference No.: 85001554
- Added to NRHP: July 11, 1985

Meadowmont is a mixed-use community in Chapel Hill, North Carolina, which contains the Meadowmont House and Meadowmont Village, among other notable locations, in addition to residential areas, shopping, and office space and has been profiled in recent years in local periodicals such as Chapel Hill Magazine.

== History ==
There was considerable controversy about the development of this community. Ground was officially broken in 1999 after 8 years of planning.

== Meadowmont House ==
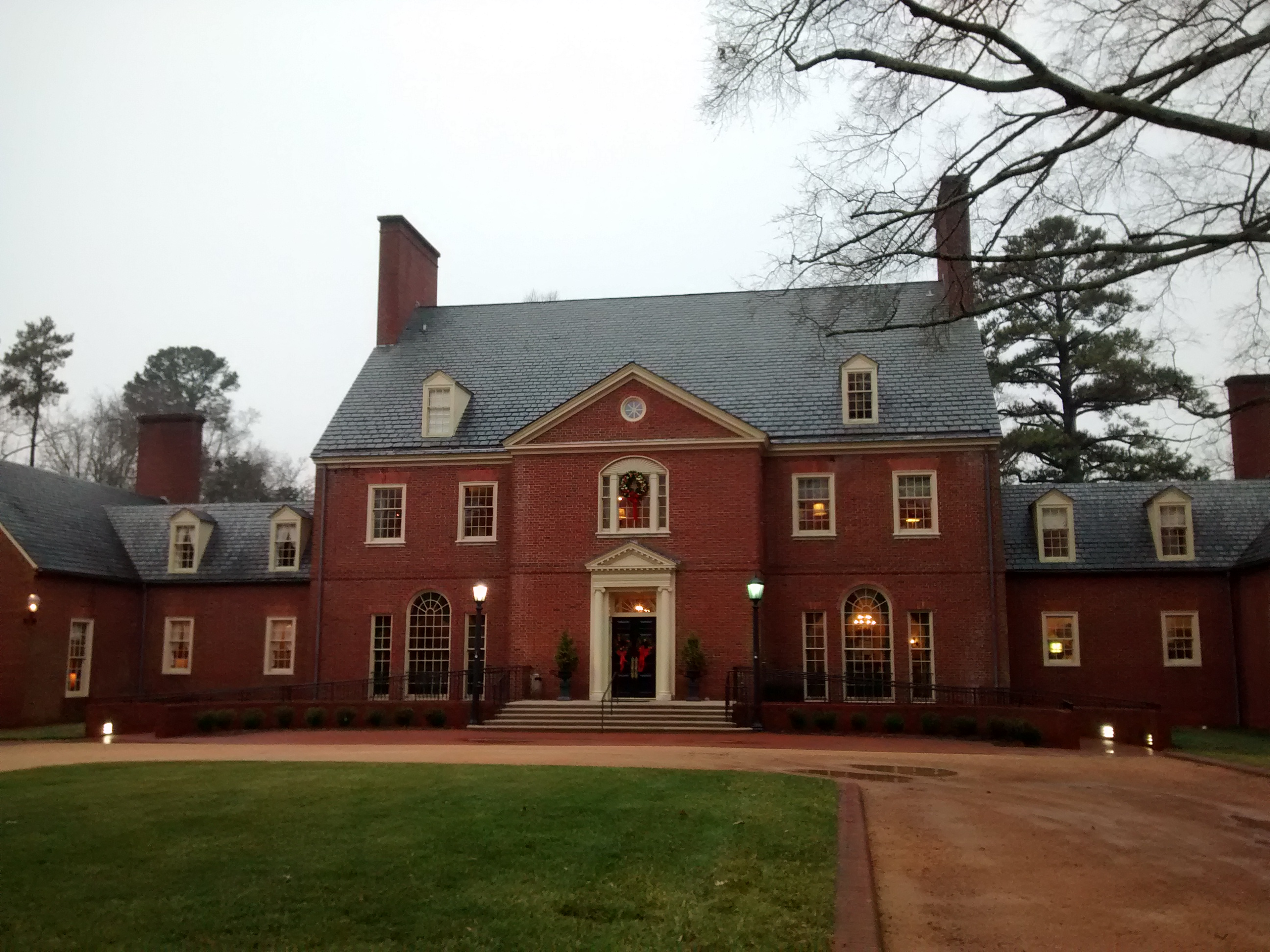
The Meadowmont House

The Meadowmont House, built in 1933 by David St. Pierre DuBose and Valinda Hill DuBose, was one of the first private homes in the United States equipped with central air conditioning. The Georgian Revival style manor house consists of a 2 1/2-story main block with 1 1/2-story flanking wings connected by 1 1/2-story hyphens. It is a steel frame and concrete building with a brick veneer. The front facade features a two-story portico and Palladian window. Associated with the house are eight contributing buildings and three contributing structures including: the play house; pool house and pool; the vegetable garden; garage; well house; poultry house; and stable.

It was listed on the National Register of Historic Places in 1985 by the National Park Service of the United States Department of the Interior as a national historic district. The community was subsequently named for this property.

The Rizzo Conference Center of UNC Chapel Hill's Kenan-Flagler Business School, which also includes other buildings, incorporates this historic property.

== Meadowmont Village ==
Meadowmont Village is a shopping center built and located in Meadowmont and is an example of New Urbanist architecture.
