= Tallman Trask =

American university administrator

Tallman Trask III
- Education: Occidental College (BA)

Tallman Trask III is an American former university administrator who served as the executive vice president at Duke University from 1995 to 2020.

== Career ==
Trask previously served as vice chancellor for academic administration at UCLA, and executive vice president of the University of Washington, where he was from 1987 to 1995.

=== Duke University ===
Trask was appointed executive vice president in 1995.

On August 30, 2014, Trask was accused of hitting parking attendant Shelvia Underwood with his car, and calling her a “dumb, dumb stupid [n-word]". The incident occurred prior to a before a Duke football game against Elon University. Underwood subsequently filed a police report with the Duke University Police Department.

The incident was among several listed by students as examples of Duke University's mistreatment of its workers, with a group of nine students occupying the Allen Building during a sit-in. On April 4, 2016, Trask issued an apology to Underwood for hitting her, but denied the usage of the racial slur.

In November 2018, Trask was appointed by Duke's president Vincent Price to be the university's point of contact regarding the planned Durham–Orange Light Rail Transit project. Price, Trask, and Duke University Health System President and CEO A. Eugene Washington sent a joint letter to GoTriangle in February 2019, declining to sign a cooperative agreement for the light rail, and the project did not proceed.

In October 2019, Trask announced his retirement. In September 2025, Trask was awarded a 2025 University Medal for Distinguished Meritorious Service, Duke University's highest honor.
