= Chapel Hill, North Carolina =

Town in the United States

Chapel Hill
- Town
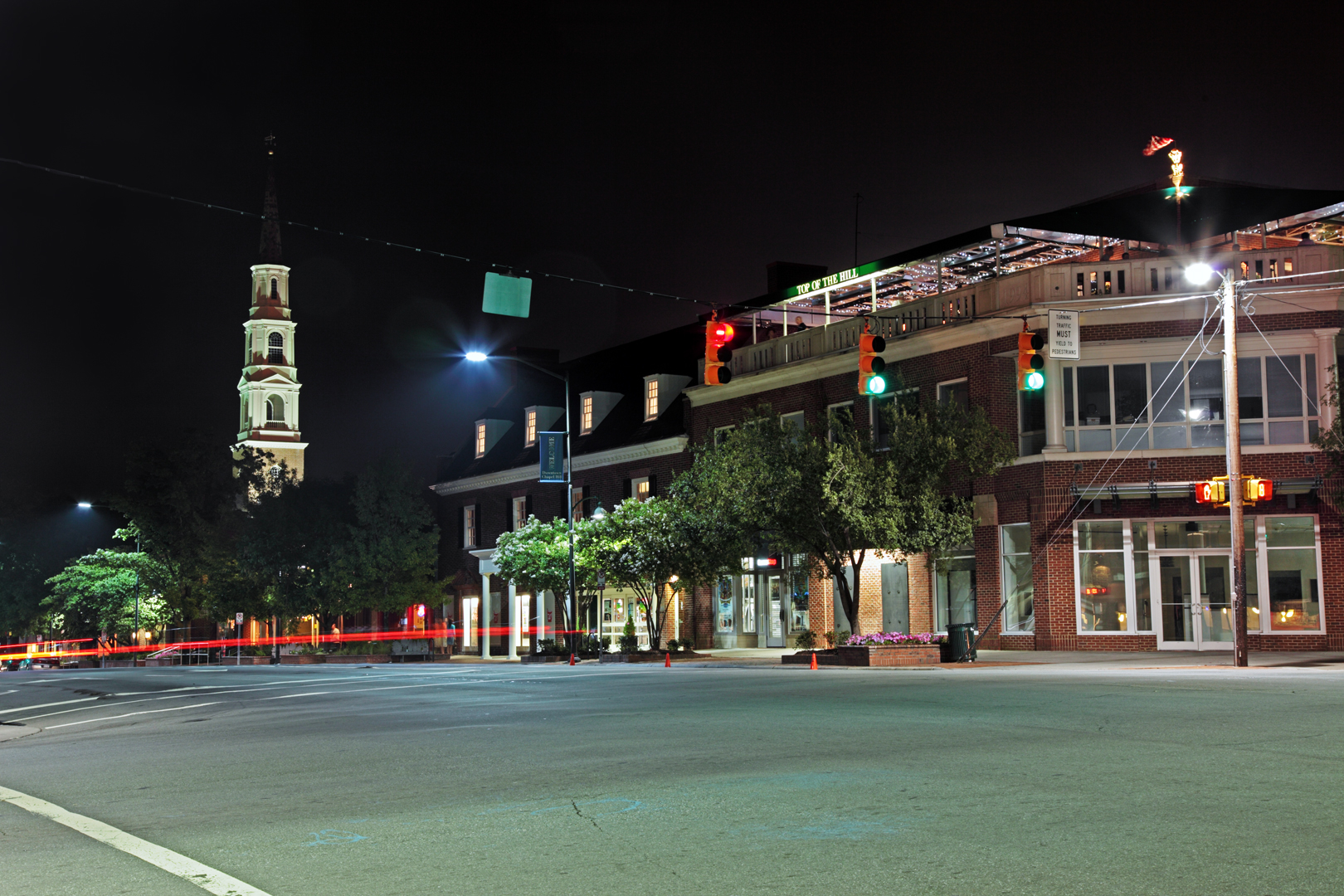
- Franklin Street

- Flag Seal
- Nickname: Southern Part of Heaven
- Motto: Learning, Serving & Working Together To Build A Community Where People Thrive.
- Interactive map of Chapel Hill
- Location within North Carolina Location within the United States
- Coordinates: 35°55′38″N 79°02′21″W
- Country: United States
- State: North Carolina
- Counties: Durham (small portion), Orange (mostly)
- Founded: 1793
- Chartered: 1851
- Named for: New Hope Chapel

Government
  - Type: Council–manager
  - Mayor: Jessica Anderson (D)

Area
  - Total: 21.75 sq mi (56.32 km^{2})
  - Land: 21.59 sq mi (55.93 km^{2})
  - Water: 0.15 sq mi (0.39 km^{2}) 0.69%
- Elevation: 262 ft (80 m)

Population (2024)
  - Total: 61,960
  - Estimate (2024): 62,043
  - Density: 2,869.1/sq mi (1,107.75/km^{2})
- Demonym: Chapel Hillian
- Time zone: UTC-5 (EST)
  - Summer (DST): UTC-4 (EDT)
- ZIP codes: 27514-27517
- Area codes: 919, 984
- FIPS code: 37-11800
- GNIS feature ID: 2406255
- Primary Airport: RDU
- Website: www.chapelhillnc.gov

Chapel Hill is an incorporated municipality in the counties of Orange and Durham, North Carolina, United States. Its population was 61,960 in the 2020 United States census, making Chapel Hill the 17th-most populous municipality in the state. Chapel Hill and Durham make up the Durham–Chapel Hill, NC Metropolitan Statistical Area, which had an estimated population of 608,879 in 2023. When it is combined with Raleigh, the state capital, they make up the corners of the Research Triangle (officially the Raleigh–Durham–Cary, NC Combined Statistical Area), which had an estimated population of 2,368,947 in 2023.

Chapel Hill was founded in 1793 and is centered on Franklin Street, covering 21.3 square miles (55 km^{2}). It contains several districts and buildings listed on the National Register of Historic Places. The University of North Carolina at Chapel Hill and UNC Health Care are a major part of the economy and town influence. Local artists have created many murals in the town.

== History ==
=== Pre-establishment and colonial era ===
The area was the home place of early settler William Barbee of Middlesex County, Virginia, whose 1753 grant of 585 acres on the north and south side of "Lick Branch" from John Carteret, 2nd Earl Granville was the first of two land grants in what is now the Chapel Hill-Durham area. Though William Barbee died shortly after settling there in 1758, one of his eight children, Christopher Barbee, became an important contributor to his father's adopted community and to the fledgling University of North Carolina. In 1792, he offered the trustees of UNC 221 acres on which the university is now built, making him the university's largest donor.

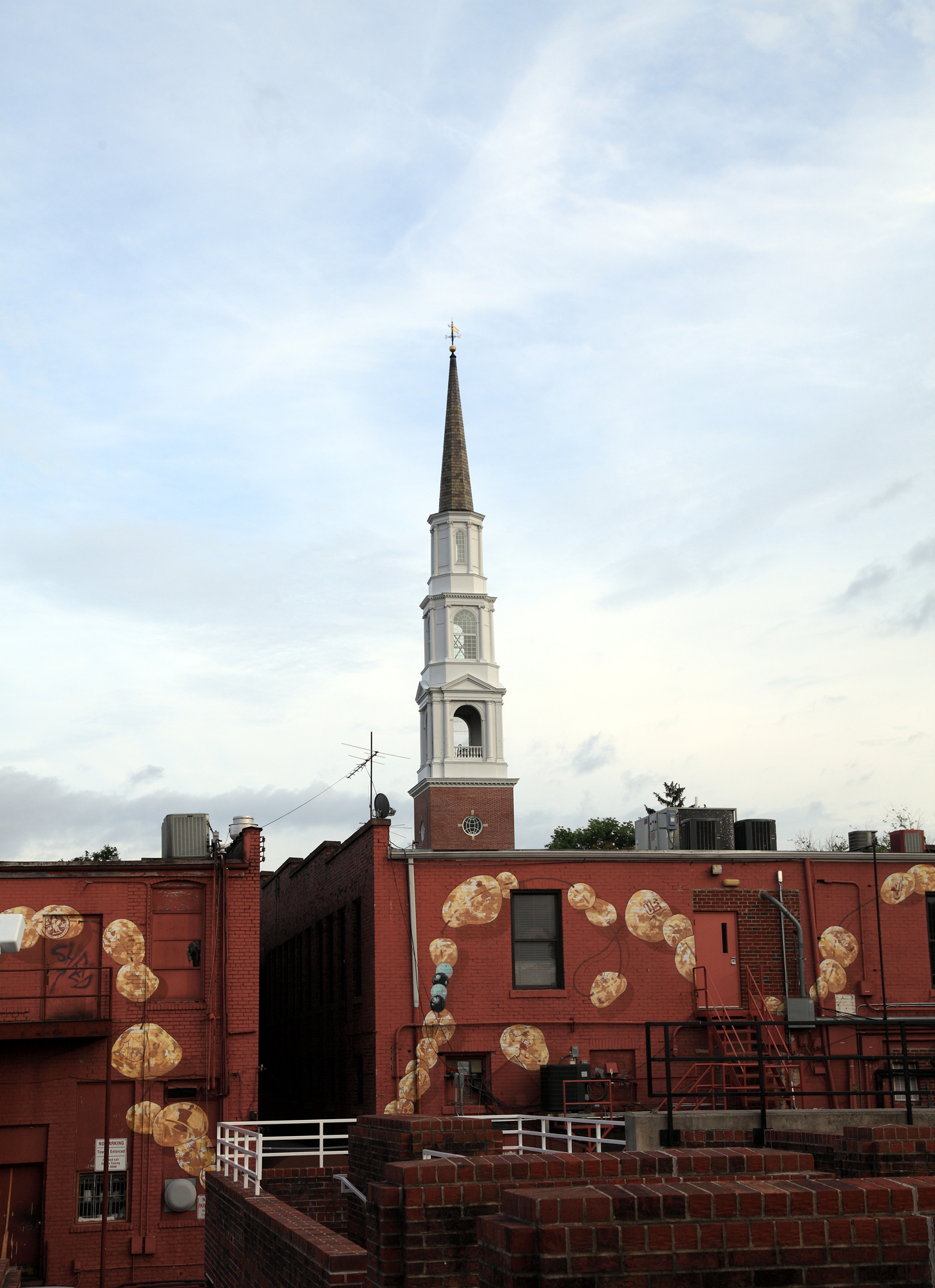
A mural at Amber Alley between Franklin and Rosemary streets

Chapel Hill has developed along a hill; the crest was the original site of a small Anglican "chapel of ease", built in 1752, known as New Hope Chapel. The Carolina Inn now occupies this site. In 1819, the town was founded by the NC General Assembly to serve the University of North Carolina and developed around it. The town was chartered in 1851, and its main street, Franklin Street, was named in memory of Benjamin Franklin.

=== Antebellum ===
Of Chapel Hill during slavery, Kemp Plummer Battle wrote,

The government of the village of Chapel Hill was primitive. All white males between 21 and 50 years of age were distributed into classes and in turn patrolled the streets at night. Slaves were liable to a whipping of ten lashes, or a fine of one dollar, for being absent from home without a written permit from the owner. Nor could a slave hire his own time.

=== Civil War ===
Four in ten Chapel Hillians were enslaved at the start of the Civil War, and about half of the town was Black. In April 1865, as the war ended, the 9th Michigan Cavalry rode into Chapel Hill and occupied the university and the town for more than two weeks.

=== Reconstruction ===
In 1869, in the lead-up to the Kirk-Holden War, Governor William Holden sent a detective into Chapel Hill to investigate the presence of the Ku Klux Klan, whose members had been riding through Chapel Hill and nearby towns committing crimes and terrorizing the populace. Once in Chapel Hill, the detective was tied to the town pump by a group of men and given sixty lashes.

In 1870, a group of Chapel Hill Conservatives attempted to overthrow the Chapel Hill Board of Commissioners. On February 28, they held a fraudulent election and installed a new Board, which seized the town records and began holding regular meetings. They appointed members of their group as Magistrate of Police, Town Constable, and Town Clerk. In early April, the Conservative Board began to face scrutiny, and on April 7, it fell apart, as their own attorney informed them that their February 28 election was not valid.

=== Great Depression ===
In 1937, Chapel Hill was the site of a race riot resulting from racial tensions, economic hardship, and neglect of Chapel Hill's black community. Geeta N. Kapur and John K. Chapman described the incident as a revolt by Black workers.

As a result of the riot, the White and Black upper class of Chapel Hill collaborated to raise money for a black community center. According to Chapman, this was with the intention of pacifying black men to prevent further unrest. In 1939, land was purchased for the Hargraves Community Center. Construction completed in 1945.

=== Civil rights era ===
In 1960, a group of Black students from Lincoln High School, called the Chapel Hill Nine, participated a sit-in at Colonial Drugstore to protest the store's refusal to serve dine-in black customers.

In 1969, a year after the town fully integrated its schools, Chapel Hill elected Howard Lee as mayor. It was the first majority-white municipality in the South to elect an African-American mayor. Serving from 1969 to 1975, Lee helped establish Chapel Hill Transit, the town's bus system, and the Mountains-to-Sea trail.

Riding Chapel Hill Transit has been fare free to passengers since 2002. The bus operations are funded through Chapel Hill and Carrboro town taxes, federal grants, and UNC student fees. The change has resulted in a large increase in ridership, taking many cars off the roads. The town’s bus fleet includes traditional, hybrid, articulated, and electric buses. All buses carry GPS transmitters to report their location in real-time to a tracking web site. Buses can transport bicycles and have wheelchair lifts.

In 1993, the town celebrated its bicentennial and founded the Chapel Hill Museum. This cultural community resource "exhibiting the character and characters of Chapel Hill, North Carolina" included among its permanent exhibits Alexander Julian, History of the Chapel Hill Fire Department, Chapel Hill's 1914 Fire Truck, The James Taylor Story, Farmer/James Pottery, and The Paul Green Legacy.

In addition to the Carolina Inn, the Beta Theta Pi Fraternity House, Chapel Hill Historic District, Chapel Hill Town Hall, Chapel of the Cross, Gimghoul Neighborhood Historic District, Alexander Hogan Plantation, Old Chapel Hill Cemetery, Old East, University of North Carolina, Playmakers Theatre, Rocky Ridge Farm Historic District, and West Chapel Hill Historic District are listed on the National Register of Historic Places.

== Geography and climate ==
Chapel Hill is located in the southeast corner of Orange County, with a small part extending east into Durham County. It is bounded on the west by the town of Carrboro and on the northeast by the city of Durham. However, most of Chapel Hill's borders are adjacent to unincorporated portions of Orange and Durham Counties rather than shared with another municipality. According to the United States Census Bureau, it has a total area of 21.75 square miles (56.3 km^{2}), of which 21.60 square miles (55.9 km^{2}) is land and 0.15 square miles (0.39 km^{2}) (0.69%) is water.

Climate data for Chapel Hill, NC (1991–2020 normals, extremes 1891–present)
Month	Jan	Feb	Mar	Apr	May	Jun	Jul	Aug	Sep	Oct	Nov	Dec	Year
Record high °F (°C)	85 (29)	85 (29)	92 (33)	98 (37)	98 (37)	104 (40)	107 (42)	106 (41)	104 (40)	99 (37)	88 (31)	84 (29)	107 (42)
Mean daily maximum °F (°C)	50.7 (10.4)	54.3 (12.4)	61.8 (16.6)	71.5 (21.9)	78.6 (25.9)	85.7 (29.8)	89.5 (31.9)	87.5 (30.8)	81.8 (27.7)	72.1 (22.3)	62.0 (16.7)	53.7 (12.1)	70.8 (21.6)
Daily mean °F (°C)	40.0 (4.4)	42.8 (6.0)	49.9 (9.9)	59.2 (15.1)	67.5 (19.7)	75.4 (24.1)	79.4 (26.3)	77.6 (25.3)	71.7 (22.1)	60.3 (15.7)	49.9 (9.9)	43.1 (6.2)	59.7 (15.4)
Mean daily minimum °F (°C)	29.4 (−1.4)	31.3 (−0.4)	38.0 (3.3)	46.8 (8.2)	56.3 (13.5)	65.0 (18.3)	69.3 (20.7)	67.7 (19.8)	61.5 (16.4)	48.5 (9.2)	37.8 (3.2)	32.4 (0.2)	48.7 (9.3)
Record low °F (°C)	−8 (−22)	−6 (−21)	9 (−13)	20 (−7)	29 (−2)	40 (4)	48 (9)	42 (6)	35 (2)	20 (−7)	12 (−11)	0 (−18)	−8 (−22)
Average precipitation inches (mm)	3.95 (100)	3.27 (83)	4.39 (112)	3.71 (94)	3.78 (96)	4.08 (104)	4.82 (122)	4.30 (109)	5.42 (138)	3.77 (96)	3.50 (89)	3.87 (98)	48.86 (1,241)
Average snowfall inches (cm)	1.5 (3.8)	0.9 (2.3)	0.1 (0.25)	0.0 (0.0)	0.0 (0.0)	0.0 (0.0)	0.0 (0.0)	0.0 (0.0)	0.0 (0.0)	0.0 (0.0)	0.1 (0.25)	0.2 (0.51)	2.8 (7.1)
Average precipitation days (≥ 0.01 in)	11.3	10.4	11.5	9.9	10.3	10.7	10.9	10.7	9.1	8.5	9.2	11.3	123.8
Average snowy days (≥ 0.1 in)	0.9	0.7	0.1	0.0	0.0	0.0	0.0	0.0	0.0	0.0	0.0	0.2	1.9
Source: NOAA

== Demographics ==
Historical population
Census	Pop.	Note	%±
1880	831		—
1890	1,017		22.4%
1900	1,099		8.1%
1910	1,149		4.5%
1920	1,483		29.1%
1930	2,699		82.0%
1940	3,654		35.4%
1950	9,177		151.1%
1960	12,573		37.0%
1970	26,199		108.4%
1980	32,421		23.7%
1990	38,719		19.4%
2000	48,715		25.8%
2010	57,233		17.5%
2020	61,960		8.3%
2025 (est.)	63,565	▲	2.6%
U.S. Decennial Census; 2020

=== 2020 census ===
Chapel Hill racial composition
Race	Number	Percentage
White (non-Hispanic)	38,678	62.42%
Black or African American (non-Hispanic)	5,848	9.44%
Native American	151	0.24%
Asian	9,275	14.97%
Pacific Islander	19	0.03%
Other/Mixed	3,255	5.25%
Hispanic or Latino	4,734	7.64%

As of the 2020 census, Chapel Hill had a population of 61,960. There were 22,118 households and 10,552 families residing in the town. The median age was 26.5 years. 16.0% of residents were under the age of 18 and 12.6% were 65 years of age or older. For every 100 females, there were 86.5 males, and for every 100 females age 18 and over, there were 83.3 males age 18 and over.

According to the 2020 census, 100.0% of residents lived in urban areas and 0.0% lived in rural areas.

Of the 22,118 households, 25.7% had children under the age of 18 living in them. Of all households, 39.2% were married-couple households, 21.5% were households with a male householder and no spouse or partner present, and 33.7% were households with a female householder and no spouse or partner present. About 32.4% of all households were made up of individuals, and 10.4% had someone living alone who was 65 years of age or older.

There were 23,713 housing units, of which 6.7% were vacant. The homeowner vacancy rate was 1.2% and the rental vacancy rate was 5.1%.

=== Demographic estimates ===
Chapel Hill is largely known for hosting the University of North Carolina at Chapel Hill. The proportion of alumni staying in the same metro area coming from a public four-year institution is 47%, whereas the proportion of alumni staying in the same state is 68%. This data explains many of the unique demographic qualities of this town.

The demographic structure of Chapel Hill is further defined by its role within the Research Triangle region. While the university attracts a continuous flow of young adults, the broader metro area is a powerful magnet for retaining and attracting skilled workers in science and technology fields. This creates a dynamic where Chapel Hill serves as an initial feeder for future professionals, with many graduates subsequently migrating to other parts of the Triangle for employment, contributing to the regions overall gain even as the town itself experiences a constant cycle of student in- and out-migration.

In 2023, Chapel Hill had a population of 59,889. The median age in Chapel Hill was 25.8 years, dramatically lower than the North Carolina state median of 39.1. This is one of the lowest median ages of any incorporated municipality in the state and is direct reflection of the university's large student population.

The town exhibits a distinct economic profile common to major college towns. These are characterized by a paradox of high median income along with high poverty rate. The 2023 median household income was $85,825, which is about 25% higher than the state median. Conversely, the poverty rate was 19.6%. This is quite a bit higher than the state average of 13.2%. The statistical contrast can be attributed to the inclusion of the student population. As is common for students, many have little to no personal income. The largest sectors of employment were Educational Services, Professional, Scientific, and Technical Services, and Health Care and Social Assistance. This profile is mainly spurred by the reputation of the educational institution of UNC as a research hub.

The five largest ethnic groups in Chapel Hill were White (Non-Hispanic), Asian (Non-Hispanic), Black or African American (Non-Hispanic), individuals of two or more races (Non-Hispanic), and White (Hispanic) (see figure 1). The foreign-born population accounted for 14.9% of residents, and 91.8% of the population were U.S. citizens.

The town has a highly educated population, with over 77% of all adult residents holding a bachelor's degree or higher, more than double the state average of 34.7%. Given the largest areas of employment and the large university, the disparity between the state population averages and the town population average is not an unexplainable phenomenon.

The housing market in Chapel Hill is characterized by high costs and a high proportion of renters, consistent with a transient student and academic population. The median property value was $576,500, more than double the North Carolina median. The homeownership rate was 48.7%, with renter-occupied households slightly outnumbering owner-occupied households.

The average commute time was 19.6 minutes, shorter than the state average. The most common means of transportation to work were driving alone at 48.1%, working from home at 27.1%, and walking at 7.7%.

=== 2010 census ===
At the 2010 census, there were 57,233 people in 20,564 households residing in the town. The population density was 2,687 people per square mile (1,037 people/km^{2}). The racial composition of the town was 72.8% White, 9.7% African American, 0.3% Native American, 11.9% Asian, 0.02% Pacific Islander, 2.7% some other race, and 2.7% of two or more races. About 6.4% of the population was Hispanic or Latino of any race.

Of the 20,564 households, 51.1% were families, 26.2% of all households had children under the age of 18 living with them, 40.2% were headed by married couples living together, 8.2% had a female householder with no husband present, and 48.9% were not families. About 30.6% of all households were made up of individuals, and 7.7% had someone living alone who was 65 years of age or older. The average household size was 2.35 and the average family size was 2.98.

In the town, the population was distributed as 17.4% under the age of 18, Individuals aged 18–24 make up the single largest age group consisting of 31.5%, 23.6% from 25 to 44, 18.4% from 45 to 64, and 9.2% who were 65 years of age or older. The median age was 25.6 years. For every 100 females, there were 87.2 males. For every 100 females age 18 and over, there were 83.6 males.

=== Income and poverty ===
According to estimates released by the U.S. Census Bureau, over the three-year period of 2005 through 2007, the median income for a household in the town was $51,690, and for a family was $91,049. Males had a median income of $50,258 versus $32,917 for females. The per capita income for the town was $35,796. About 8.6% of families and 19.8% of the population were below the poverty line, including 8.6% of those under age 18 and 5.6% of those age 65 or over.

=== Education levels ===
Chapel Hill is North Carolina's best-educated municipality, proportionately, with 77% of adult residents (25 and older) holding an associate degree or higher, and 73% of adults possessing a baccalaureate degree or higher.

== Government ==
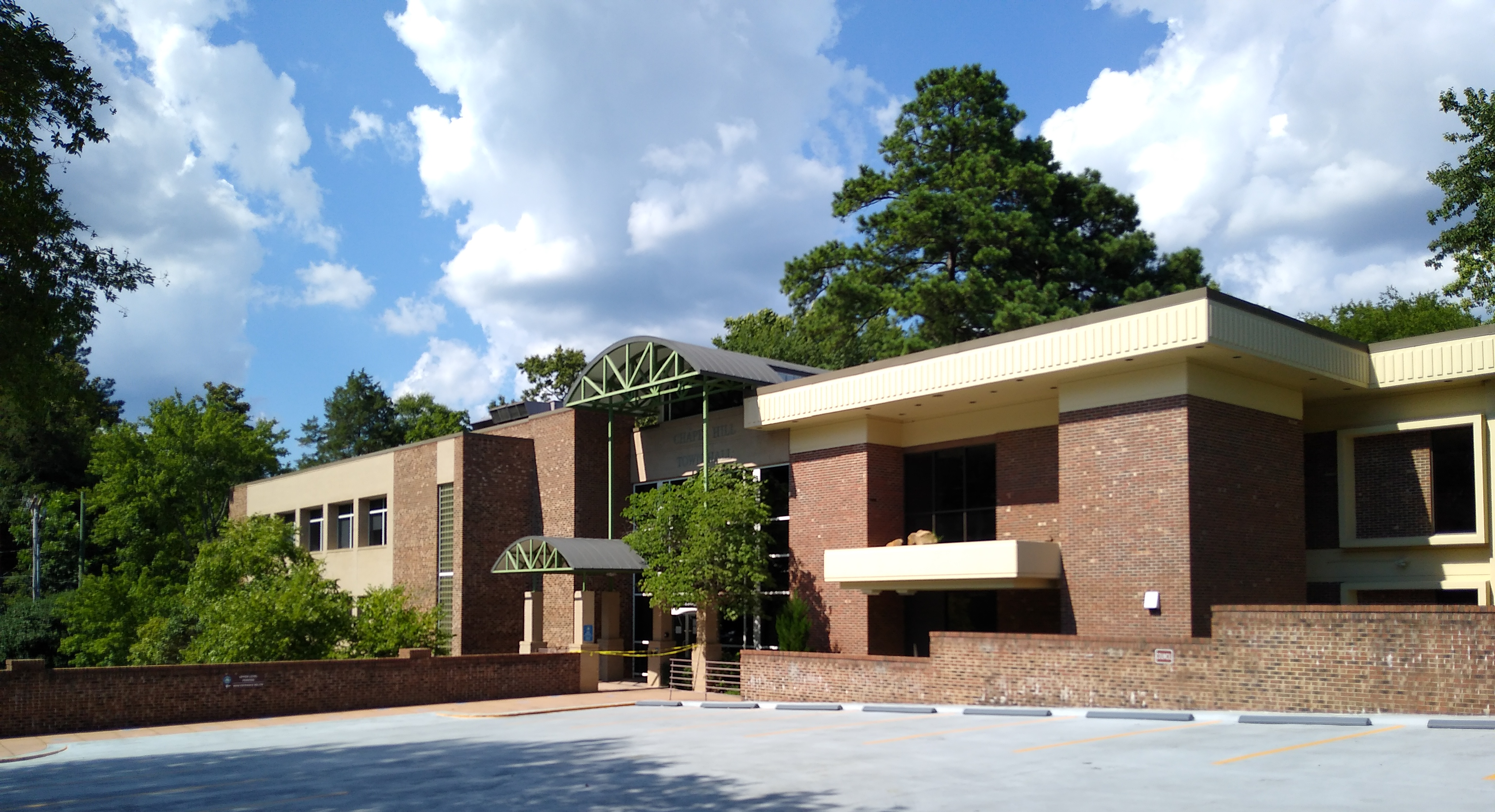
Chapel Hill Town Hall

Chapel Hill uses a council–manager form of government. The community elects a mayor and eight council members. Mayors serve two-year terms, and council members serve staggered four-year terms, all elected by the town at large; town elections are held in November of odd-numbered years. Mayor Jessica Anderson, a former council member, succeeded four-term mayor Pam Hemminger in 2023. In 2015, Hemminger defeated incumbent Mark Kleinschmidt, who had been elected in 2009 as the first openly gay mayor of Chapel Hill, succeeding outgoing four-term mayor Kevin Foy.

The town adopted its flag in 1990. According to flag designer Spring Davis, the blue represents the town and the University of North Carolina (whose colors are Carolina blue and white); the green represents "environmental awareness"; and the "townscape" in the inverted chevron represents "a sense of home, friends, and community."

The town's seal, has, since the 1930s, depicted Athena, the Greek goddess of wisdom and protector of cities. Having gone through several revisions, the seal was most recently updated in 2005 to a visually simpler version. The town introduced a new simplified logo in January 2026.

== Education ==
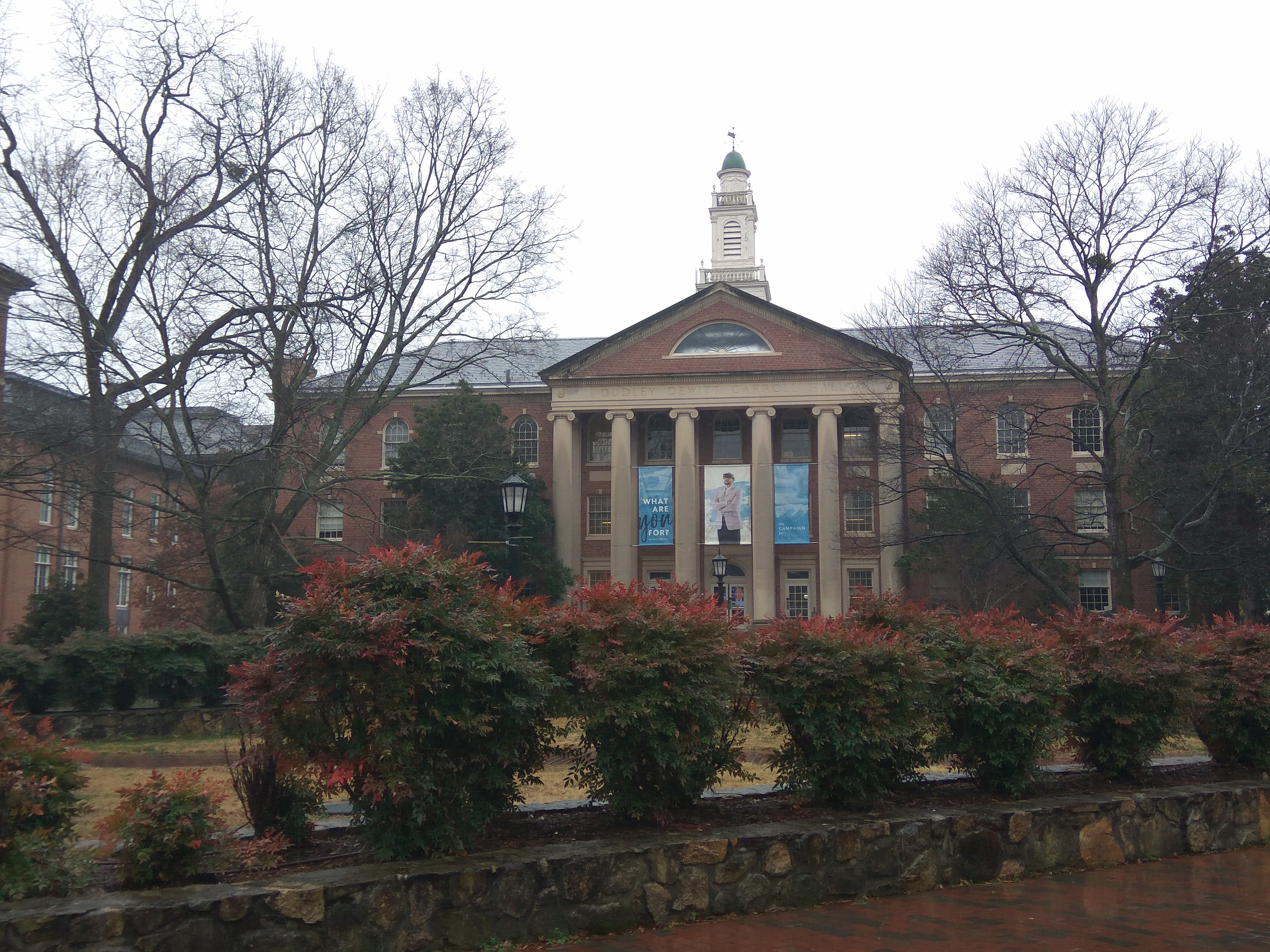
Caroll Hall which houses the UNC Hussman School of Journalism and Media at the University of North Carolina at Chapel Hill

Chapel Hill-Carrboro City Schools covers most of Chapel Hill and all of Carrboro, along with portions of unincorporated Orange County. East Chapel Hill High School, Carrboro High School, and Chapel Hill High School have all received national recognition for excellence, with Newsweek in 2008 ranking East Chapel Hill High as the 88th-best high school in the nation, and the highest-ranked standard public high school in North Carolina.

The small portion of Chapel Hill located in Durham County is part of Durham Public Schools.

There are several private K-12 schools in Chapel Hill, including Emerson Waldorf School.

Founded in 1789, the University of North Carolina at Chapel Hill is a public research university and is the flagship of the University of North Carolina System.

The state's main youth orchestra, Piedmont Youth Orchestra, is based in Chapel Hill.

The town also operates its own library system. Since 2024, its director is Atlas Logan.

== Culture ==
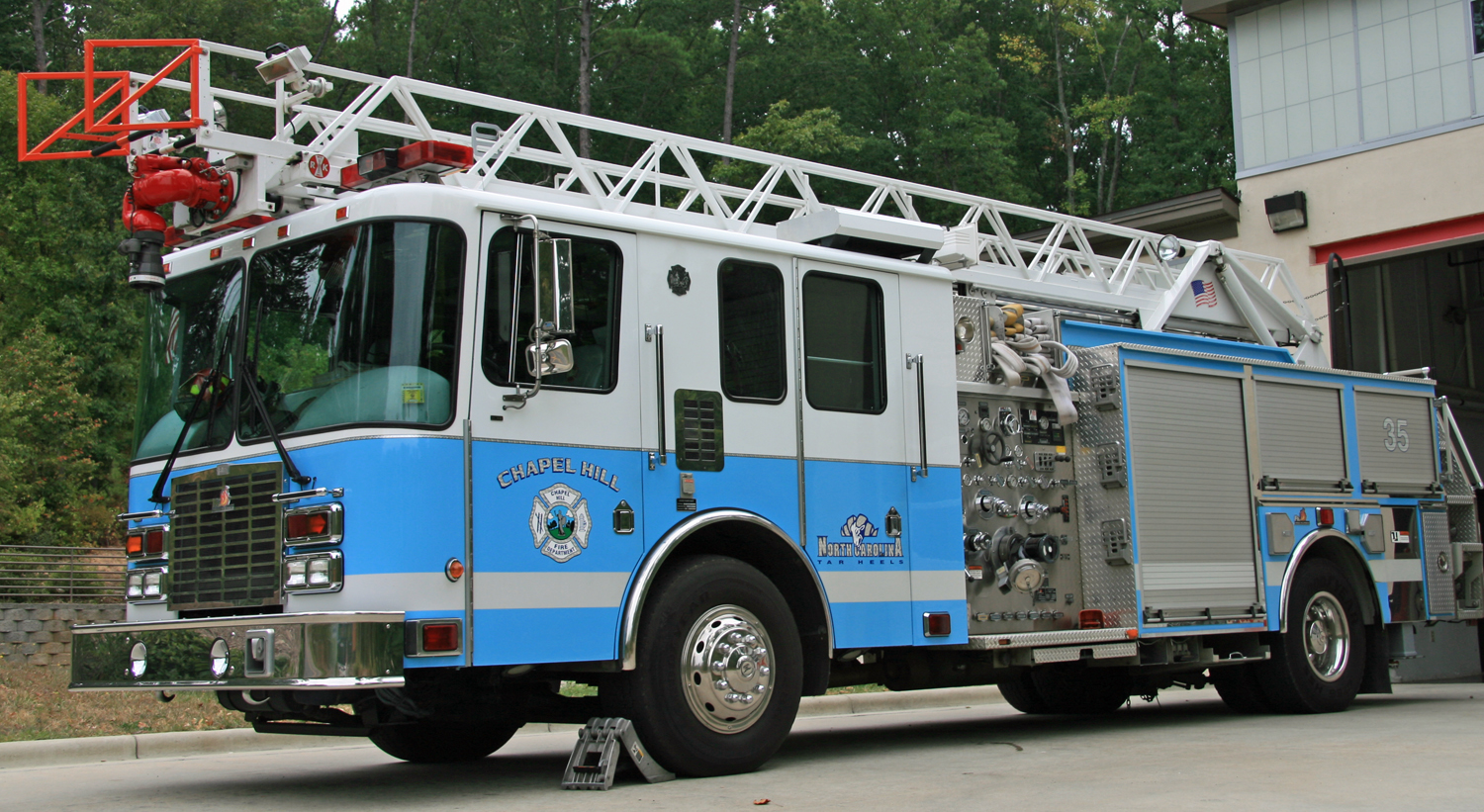
Chapel Hill fire truck, painted with the colors of the University of North Carolina at Chapel Hill

Though Chapel Hill is a principal town of a large metropolitan area, it retains a relatively small-town feel. Combined with its close neighbor, the Chapel Hill-Carrboro area has roughly 85,000 residents. Many large murals can be seen painted on the buildings. Most of these murals were painted by UNC alumnus Michael Brown. Also, for more than 30 years, Chapel Hill has sponsored the annual street fair, Festifall, in October. The fair offer booths to artists, craftsmakers, nonprofits, and food vendors. Performance space is also available for musicians, martial artists, and other groups. The fair is attended by tens of thousands each year.

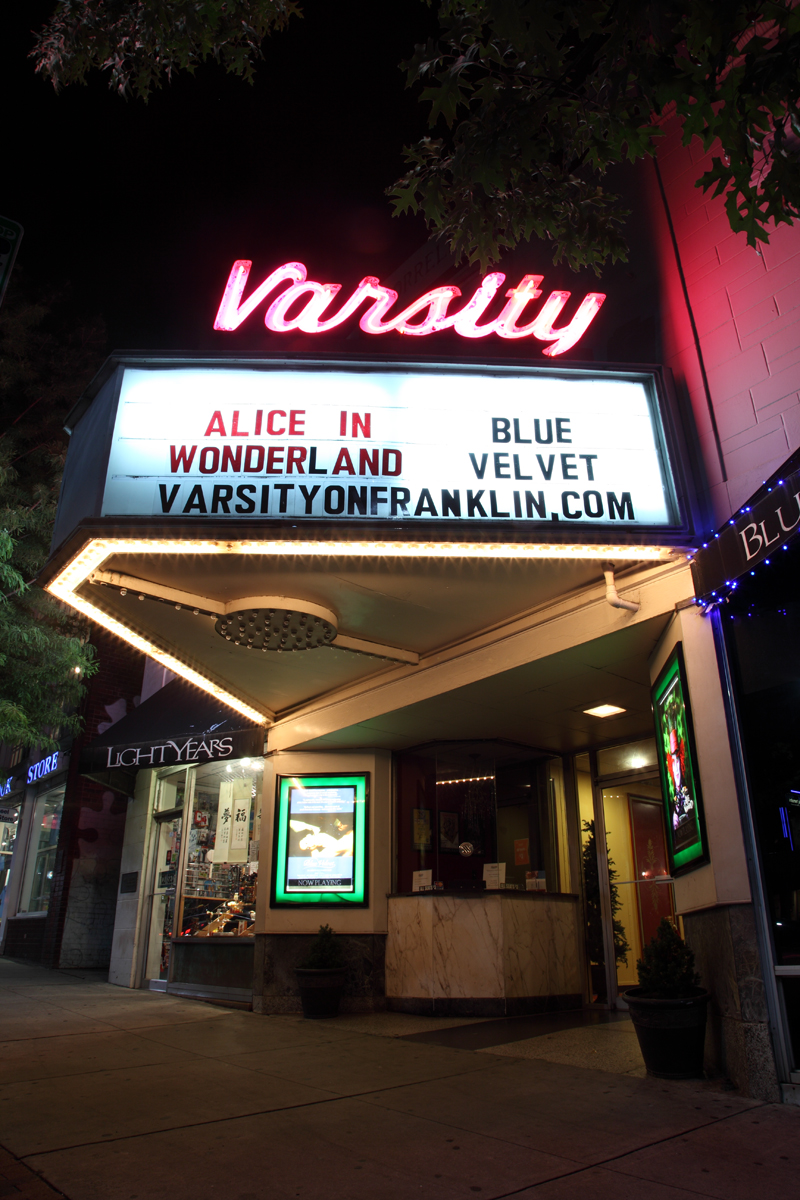
The Sorrell building on Franklin Street has housed a movie theater (currently called the Varsity Theatre) since its construction in 1927.

The Morehead Planetarium and Science Center was the first planetarium built on a U.S. college campus. When it opened in 1949, it was one of six planetariums in the nation and has remained an important town landmark. During the Mercury, Gemini, and Apollo programs, astronauts were trained there. One of the town's hallmark features is the giant sundial, located in the green square in front of the planetarium on Franklin Street.

Influences of the university are seen throughout the town, even in the fire departments. Each fire station in Chapel Hill has a fire engine (numbers 31, 32, 33, 34, and 35) that is Carolina blue. These engines are also decorated with different UNC decals, including a firefighter Rameses.

Chapel Hill also has some new urbanist village communities, such as Meadowmont Village and Southern Village. Meadowmont and Southern Village both have shopping centers, green space where concerts, movies, and other outdoor events have taken place, community pools, and schools. Also, a traditional-style mall with a mix of national and local retailers is located at University Place.

=== Food ===
Described as one of America's Foodiest Small Towns by Bon Appétit, it has nationally noted restaurants such as Mama Dip's (Food Network's $40 A Day With Rachael Ray), Sunrise Biscuit Kitchen (The Splendid Table), caffè Driade (Food Network's $40 A Day With Rachael Ray), Lantern Restaurant (Food & Wine, Southern Living), and Vimala's Curryblossom Cafe.

=== Music ===
In the realm of popular music, James Taylor, George Hamilton IV, Southern Culture on the Skids, Superchunk, Polvo, Archers of Loaf, Ben Folds Five, The Kingsbury Manx, Spider Bags and more recently Porter Robinson, are among the most notable musical artists and acts whose careers began in Chapel Hill. The town has also been a center for the modern revival of old-time music and bluegrass with composer as Elizabeth Cotten and such bands as the Ayr Mountaineers, Hollow Rock String band, Watchhouse (formerly known as Mandolin Orange), Steep Canyon Rangers, Mipso, the Tug Creek Ramblers, Two Dollar Pistols, the Fuzzy Mountain String band, Big Fat Gap and the Red Clay Ramblers.

Chapel Hill was also the founding home of now Durham-based Merge Records. Bruce Springsteen has made a point to visit the town on four occasions. His most recent appearance was on September 15, 2003, at Kenan Memorial Stadium with the E Street Band. U2 also performed at Kenan on the first American date of their 1983 War Tour, where Bono climbed up to the top of the stage, during pouring rain and lightning, holding up a white flag for peace. The 2011 John Craigie song, "Chapel Hill", is about the singer's first visit there. One song from Dirty, a Sonic Youth album, is named after the town.

=== Sports ===
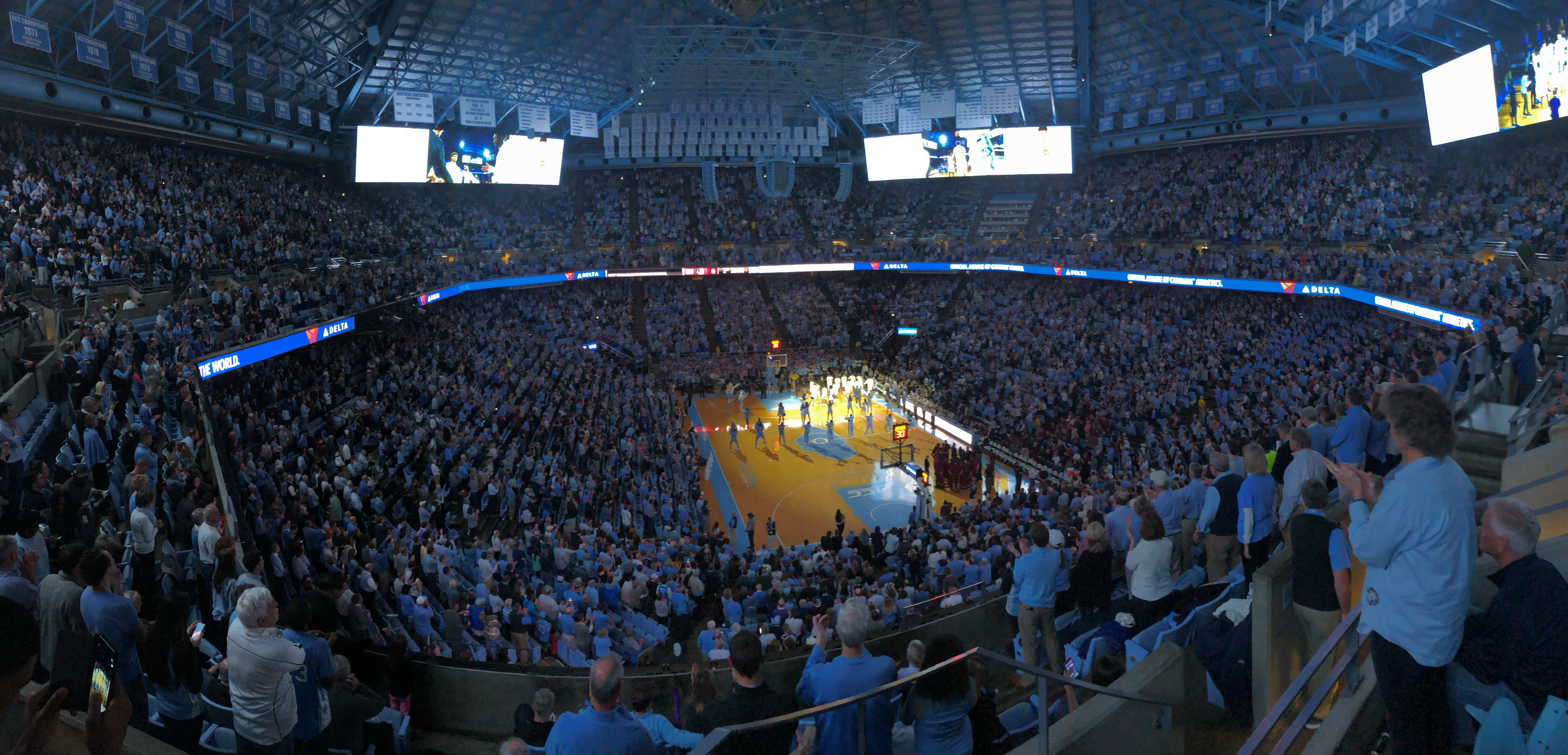
The Dean Smith Center, home of North Carolina Tar Heels men's basketball

The University of North Carolina has a strong tradition in college basketball and women's soccer, and interest in these sports has been a distinctive feature of the town's culture, fueled by the Tobacco Road rivalry among North Carolina's four ACC teams: the North Carolina Tar Heels, the Duke Blue Devils, the NC State Wolfpack, and the Wake Forest Demon Deacons.

The two largest sports venues in the town both house UNC teams. The Dean Smith Center is home to the men's basketball team, while Kenan Memorial Stadium is home to the football team. In addition, Chapel Hill is also home to Carmichael Arena which formerly housed the UNC men's basketball team, and currently is home to the women's team, and to the new Dorrance Field, home to men's and women's soccer and lacrosse teams.

Many walking/biking trails are in Chapel Hill. Some of these include Battle Branch Trail, Morgan Creek Trail and Bolin Creek Trail, Chapel Hill's oldest trail and most popular greenway.

=== Media ===
- WCHL: local AM radio station (1360AM, 97.9FM) providing talk radio, news, and local sports coverage as the flagship station of the Tar Heel Sports Network.
- WUNC: local public radio station (91.5FM) located on the UNC campus.
- WXYC: noncommercial student-run radio station (89.3FM) on the UNC campus. In 1994, it became the first radio station in the world to broadcast over the internet.
- The Daily Tar Heel is the nationally ranked, independent student newspaper that serves the university and the town. The free newspaper is printed thrice weekly during the academic year and weekly during summer sessions.
- The Sun Magazine is an independent, ad-free magazine that for more than 40 years has published personal essays, interviews, short stories, poetry, and photographs.
- Carrboro Citizen was a locally owned community newspaper covering local news, politics and town government of Chapel Hill and Carrboro. The last issue was published in October 2012.
- The metro area has TV broadcasting stations that serve the Raleigh-Durham Designated Market Area (DMA) as defined by Nielsen Media Research.

== Transit ==
=== Bus ===
Chapel Hill has no-fee intracity bus service via Chapel Hill Transit. Park & Ride lots provide financial support for the service, and fees are collected through UNC Parking. The connecting services are fee-based, but subsidized for UNC students, staff, and faculty. Go Triangle provides connection to the rest of the Triangle (Raleigh, Durham, and Hillsborough), of which the Hillsborough service is operated by Chapel Hill Transit, and supplemented mid-day by a county shuttle.

=== Light rail ===
The Canceled Durham–Orange Light Rail line was a project which, would have run between Chapel Hill and Durham, entered planning and engineering phases in August 2017. The project was discontinued in April 2019.

== Notable people ==
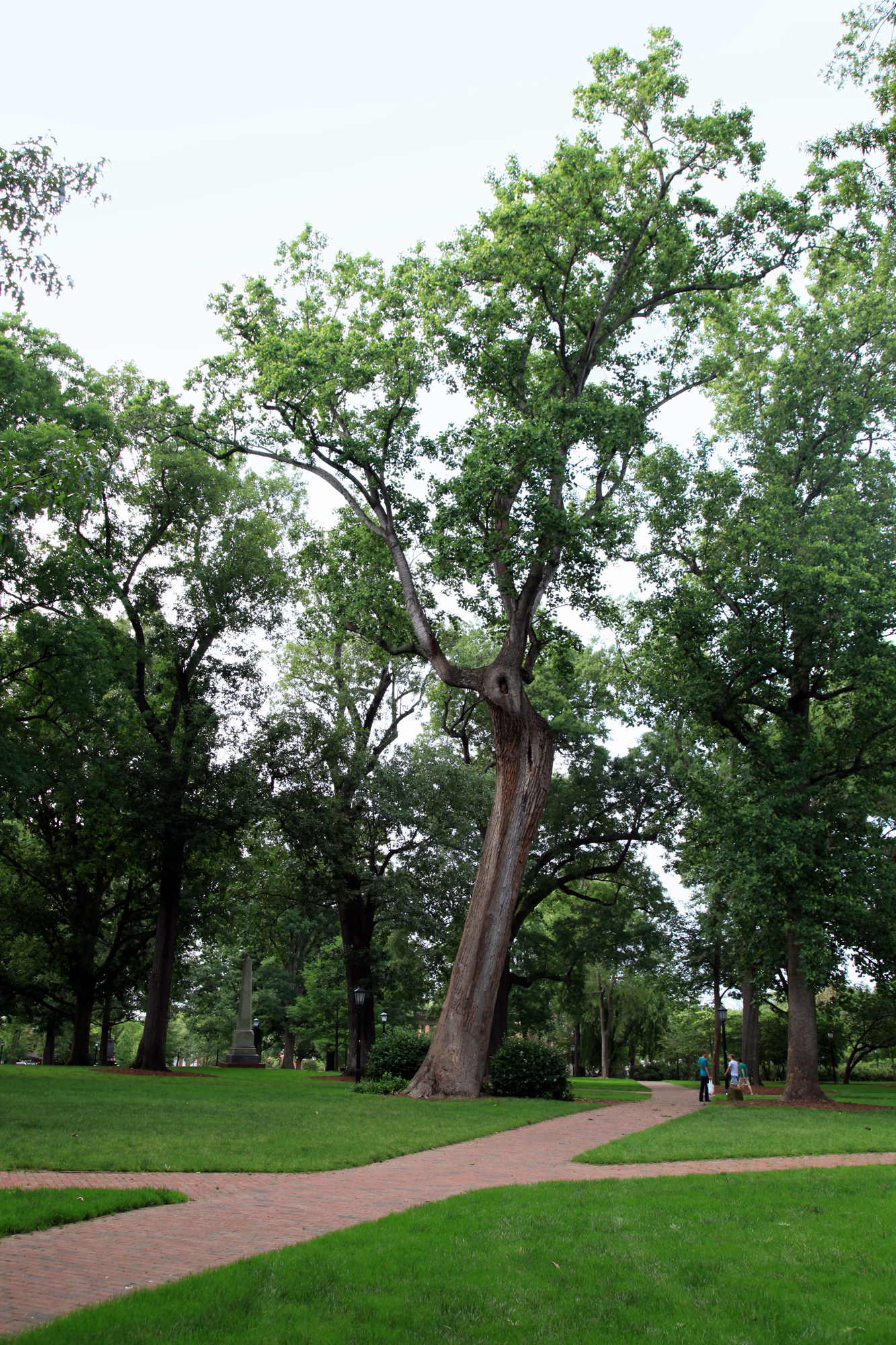
UNC's wooded campus buffers the town center

- Alice Adams, author
- Emil Amos, musician
- Owen Astrachan, Duke Professor of Computer Science
- John David Roy Atchison (1954–2007), Assistant US Attorney and children's sports coach, committed suicide in prison after being charged with soliciting sex from a five-year-old girl
- George A. Baer (1903–1994), bookbinder
- Stephen Barrett, retired psychiatrist, webmaster of Quackwatch
- Lewis Black, stand-up comedian, author, actor
- Ash Bowie, musician
- Steve Breedlove, clergyman, bishop in the Anglican Church in North America
- Sean Bridgers, actor, screenwriter, director, producer
- Fred Brooks, computer scientist
- Christopher Browning, historian
- Cam Cameron, football coach
- Spencer Chamberlain, musician
- Doug Clark and the Hot Nuts, band.
- Anna Clendening, singer, songwriter.
- Fred C. Cole, librarian and historian
- Elizabeth Cotten, musician
- Floyd Council, blues singer, the "Floyd" after which Pink Floyd is named
- Butch Davis, former UNC football coach
- Hubert Davis, UNC basketball coach, ESPN analyst, former NBA basketball player
- Walter Royal Davis, North Carolina philanthropist and oil tycoon
- Anoop Desai, finalist on American Idol, singer
- Sarah Dessen, author
- Michelle Dorrance, dancer and MacArthur Fellowship recipient
- David Drake, science fiction and fantasy novelist and small-press publisher
- Elizabeth Edwards, late wife of former U.S. Senator of North Carolina John Edwards
- John Edwards, former presidential candidate
- Lawrence Ferlinghetti, Beat Generation poet and co-founder of City Lights Book Sellers & Publishers. Earned a B.A. in journalism from UNC-Chapel Hill in 1941.
- Ben Folds, musician
- Valerie Foushee, U.S. representative for North Carolina
- Paul Green, playwright
- John Grisham, author
- Meredith Hagner, actress, portrays Liberty Ciccone on As the World Turns
- Bernardo Harris, former NFL linebacker
- Dave Haywood, musician, member of the country music group Lady Antebellum
- Bunn Hearn, MLB pitcher
- Jack Hogan, actor, noted for his role as Private William Kirby on Combat! television series, 1962–1967
- Laurel Holloman, artist and actress. Known for The L Word television series.
- George Moses Horton, a slave poet, called "the black bard of Chapel Hill"
- Paul Jones, computer technologist
- Alexander Julian, fashion designer
- Michelle Kasold, Olympic field hockey player
- Jackson Koivun, golfer
- Charles Kuralt, journalist
- Kay Kyser, big band leader, entertainer
- Howard Lee, first black mayor of a predominantly white municipality in the South
- William Leuchtenberg, historian
- William Carter Love, U.S. representative for North Carolina
- Mandolin Orange, Andrew Marlin and Emily Frantz, a folk/Americana duo
- Mac McCaughan, musician
- Nick McCrory, Olympic bronze medalist in diving
- Richard McKenna, novelist, The Sand Pebbles
- Mark Newhouse, professional poker player
- Mojo Nixon, singer
- Howard Thomas Odum (1924–2002), ecologist
- Marty Ravellette, armless hero
- David Rees, political satirist, cartoonist of Get Your War On
- Porter Robinson, electronic music producer
- Brian Roberts, former MLB second baseman, two-time All-Star
- Dexter Romweber, rockabilly roots-rocker
- Aziz Sancar, winner of the 2015 Nobel Prize in Chemistry
- Betty Smith, novelist, A Tree Grows in Brooklyn
- Dean Smith, former basketball coach
- Oliver Smithies, physical biochemist and genetecist, Nobel prizewinner
- Elizabeth Spencer, author of The Light in the Piazza
- Silda Wall Spitzer, wife of former New York governor Eliot Spitzer
- Chris Stamey, musician
- Josh Stein, governor and former attorney general of North Carolina
- Brook Steppe, former NBA player
- Leo Sternbach, chemist and discoverer of benzodiazepines
- Matt Stevens, former NFL safety
- James Taylor, musician
- Paul B. Thompson, author and UNC alumnus
- Blair Tindall, author and musician
- Richard Trice, blues guitarist, singer and songwriter
- Willie Trice, blues guitarist, singer, songwriter and record producer. Elder brother of above
- Karl Edward Wagner, horror writer, editor, and small-press publisher
- Daniel Wallace, writer, author of Big Fish: A Novel of Mythic Proportions
- Manly Wade Wellman, novelist
- Roy Williams, men's basketball coach
- Thomas Wolfe, author. UNC alumnus. Chapel Hill appears as "Pulpit Hill" in his posthumous novel You Can't Go Home Again.
- Bayard Wootten (1875–1959), photographer and suffragette

== Sister cities ==
- Puerto Baquerizo Moreno, San Cristóbal (Galápagos, Ecuador)

== See also ==
- List of municipalities in North Carolina
- Chapel Hill Transit
- UNC Health Care
- University of North Carolina at Chapel Hill
- Carolina Brewery
- Chapel Hill Zen Center
