= Educational Services of America =

Educational Services of America (ESA) is an alternative school management company. Its divisions include Ombudsman Educational Services, EAP (Early Autism Project) and Spectrum Center. It is based in Nashville, Tennessee. The company partners with school districts It was founded in 1999 and is based in Knoxville, Tennessee. Mark Claypool is the company's president and Chief Executive Officer.
