= Chapel Hill =

Chapel Hill or Chapelhill may refer to:

== Places ==
=== Antarctica ===
- Chapel Hill (Antarctica)

=== Australia ===
- Chapel Hill, Queensland, a suburb of Brisbane
- Chapel Hill, South Australia, in the Mount Barker council area

=== Canada ===
- Chapel Hill, Ottawa, a neighbourhood of Ottawa

=== Ireland ===
- Chapelhill (townland), in County Laois

=== United Kingdom ===
- Chapel Hill, Lincolnshire, England
- Chapel Hill, Monmouthshire, Wales
- Chapel Hill, North Yorkshire, England

=== United States ===
- Chapel Hill, Alabama (disambiguation)
- Chapel Hills Mall, Colorado Springs, Colorado
- Chapel Hill, Indiana
- Chapel Hill, Indianapolis, a neighborhood on the west side of Indianapolis, Indiana
- Chapel Hill Historic District (Cumberland, Maryland), listed on the NRHP in Allegany County
- Chapel Hill, New Jersey, an unincorporated community
- Chapel Hill Bible Church, Marlboro, New York, listed on the NRHP in Ulster County
- Chapel Hill, North Carolina, a town
  - Chapel Hill Historic District (Chapel Hill, North Carolina), listed on the NRHP in Orange County
  - Chapel Hill Town Hall, listed on the NRHP in Orange County, North Carolina
  - Old Chapel Hill Cemetery, listed on the NRHP in Orange County, North Carolina
  - University of North Carolina at Chapel Hill, a university within the town
  - West Chapel Hill Historic District, North Carolina
- Chapel Hill, a neighborhood centered on Chapel Hill Mall in Akron, Ohio
- Chapel Hill, Tennessee, a town
  - Chapel Hill Cumberland Presbyterian Church, Chapel Hill, Tennessee, listed on the NRHP in Marshall County
- Chapel Hill (Berryville, Virginia), listed on the NRHP in Clarke County
- Chapel Hill (Lexington, Virginia), listed on the NRHP in Rockbridge County
- Chapel Hill (Mint Spring, Virginia), listed on the NRHP in Augusta County

== Music ==
- "Chapel Hill", a song by John Craigie from the album October is the Kindest Month
- "Chapel Hill", a song by Sonic Youth from the album Dirty

== See also ==
- Chapel Hill High School (disambiguation)
- Chapel Hill Historic District (disambiguation)
