= Chappell (surname) =

Chappell is an English surname. Notable people with the surname include:

- Absalom Harris Chappell (1801–1878), American politician, lawyer
- Alex Chappell (born 1988), American journalist
- Bob Chappell (died 2009), Australian murder victim
- Charles Richard Chappell (born 1943), American physicist and astronaut candidate
- Christopher Chappell (born 1955), Canadian cricketer
- Crystal Chappell (born 1965), American soap opera star
- Darrin Chappell, American politician
- Ellise Chappell (born 1992), English actress
- Emma C. Chappell (1941–2021), American banker
- Eric Chappell (1933–2022), English TV writer
- Ernest Chappell (1903–1983), American broadcaster
- Frederick Chappell (1849–1907), English footballer
- Jan Chappell (born 1949), British actress
- Jim Chappell (born 1955), American smooth jazz pianist
- John J. Chappell (1782–1871), U.S. Representative from South Carolina
- Joseph Harris Chappell (1849–1906), American university president, author, and educator
- Julie Chappell (born 1978), British diplomat and communications specialist
- Katherine Chappell (1985–2015), visual effects editor
- Kevin Chappell (born 1986), American professional golfer
- Lisa Chappell (born 1968), New Zealand actress
- Lucy Chappell, English obstetrician
- Marisa Chappell, American historian
- Roy W. Chappell (1896–1982), British military aviator
- Samuel Chappell (1782–1834), co-founder of Chappell & Co.
- Steve Chappell (born 1969/70), American aerospace engineer and mountain climber
- Sydney Chappell (1915–1987), Welsh professional footballer
- The Chappell family of Australian cricketers:
  - Ian Chappell (born 1943), batsman and captain
  - Greg Chappell (born 1948), batsman and captain
  - Trevor Chappell (born 1952), batsman and bowler
- Tom Chappell (19th century), British music publisher of Chappell & Co.
- Tom Chappell (born 1943), American business man and manufacturer
- Tyreek Chappell (born 2002), American football player
- Urso Chappell (1967–2020), American graphic designer and world's fair historian
- Walter Chappell (1925–2000), American photographer and poet
- Warren Chappell (1904–1991), American author, illustrator and book designer
- William Chappell (disambiguation), several people

== See also ==
- Chapple (disambiguation)
