= Chapel (disambiguation) =

A chapel is a Christian place of prayer and worship that is usually relatively small.

Chapel or chapels may also refer to:

== Places ==
=== United Kingdom ===
- Chapel, Cornwall, England
- Chapel, Cumbria, England
- Chapels, Cumbria, England
- Chapel, Fife, Scotland

=== United States ===
- Chapel, Howell County, Missouri
- Chapel, Putnam County, Missouri
- Chapel, West Virginia

== Fictional characters ==
- Chapel (character), a comic character
- Billy Chapel, protagonist of the 1991 novel For Love of the Game and the 1999 film adaptation
- Christine Chapel, in the Star Trek universe
- Mr. Chapel, in the Vengeance Unlimited TV series

== People ==
- Alain Chapel (1937-1990), French chef
- Billy Chapel, bronze medalist in the 1966 U.S. Figure Skating Championships
- Charles Edward Chapel (died 1967), American politician and author
- Jean Chapel (Opal Jean Amburgey, 1925-1995), American country singer and songwriter

== Other uses ==
- Chapel (music), a group of musicians
- Chapel, a sub-branch of a local union
- Chapel Music, formerly Chapel Records, a record label
- Chapel (programming language), developed by Cray Inc.
- The Chapel (film), 2023 Spanish film

== See also ==
- Chapel Hill (disambiguation)
- Chapel Island (disambiguation)
- Chappel (disambiguation)
- Chappell (disambiguation)
- Kapelle (disambiguation)
- Faith Chapel (disambiguation)
- Chapel Church, in Brussels, Belgium
- Chapel inclined plane, a cable railway in Derbyshire, England
- Chapel Street, Melbourne, Australia, a shopping, dining and entertainment precinct
- Chapels, Cumbria, a hamlet in England
