= Chapple =

Chapple may refer to:

== People ==
=== Surname ===
- Alex Chapple, Canadian director and actor
- Belinda Chapple, Australian singer
- Brian Chapple, English composer
- David Chapple, American football player and artist
- Derek Barton-Chapple, English actor
- Eliot Chapple, American anthropologist
- Ewart Chapple (1901–1995), Australian pianist, broadcasting executive
- Frank Chapple, English unionist
- Frederic Chapple (1845–1924), headmaster of Prince Alfred College
- Frederick Chapple, English footballer
- Geoff Chapple, English football manager
- Geoff Chapple, New Zealand author and journalist
- Glen Chapple, English cricketer
- James Chapple, New Zealand pacifist
- Jane Chapple-Hyam, English racehorse trainer
- Jem Chapple, British jockey
- John Chapple (disambiguation)
- Lee Chapple, American football quarterback
- Les Chapple, Australian rules footballer
- Murray Chapple, New Zealand cricketer
- Peter Chapple-Hyam, English racehorse trainer
- Phil Chapple, English footballer
- Phoebe Chapple MM (1879–1967), South Australian medico
- Robin Chapple, Australian politician
- Thomas William Chapple, Canadian politician
- William Chapple (disambiguation)

=== Given name ===
- Chapple Norton, British army colonel and politician

== Places ==
- Chapple Cornes, Michigan, United States
- Chapple, Ontario, Canada

== See also ==
- Chappel (disambiguation)
- Chappell (disambiguation)
- Chapples Park, Thunder Bay, Ontario, Canada
