= Chapel Hill Historic District =

Chapel Hill Historic District may refer to:

- Chapel Hill Historic District (Cumberland, Maryland), listed on the National Register of Historic Places (NRHP)
- Chapel Hill Historic District (Chapel Hill, North Carolina), NRHP-listed

== See also ==
- West Chapel Hill Historic District, Chapel Hill, North Carolina, NRHP-listed
