= Beta Theta Pi Fraternity House (Chapel Hill, North Carolina) =

- U.S. National Register of Historic Places
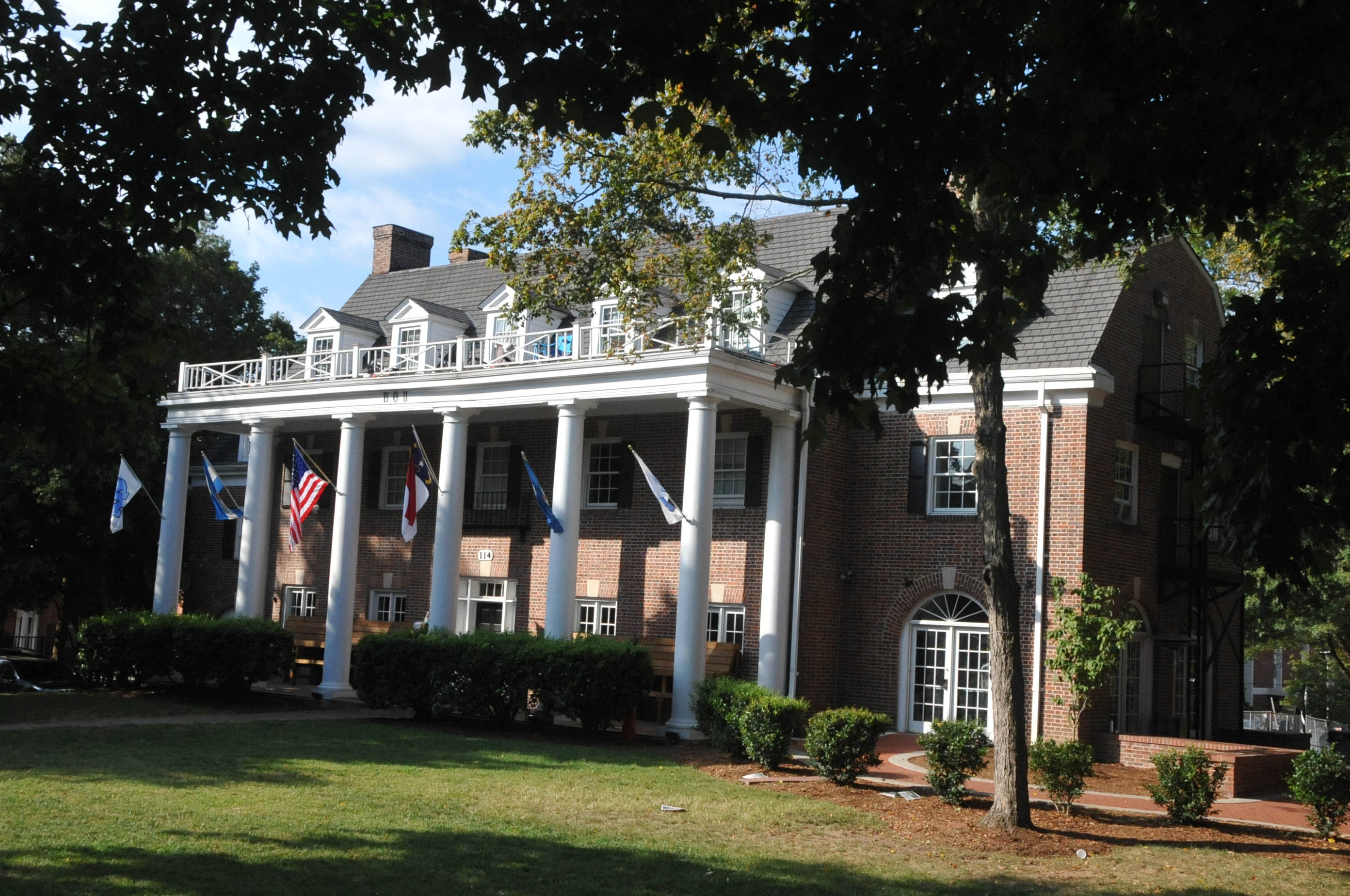
- Beta Theta Pi Fraternity House, March 2007

- Location within North Carolina Location within the United States
- Location: 114 South Columbia St., Chapel Hill, North Carolina
- Coordinates: 35°54′49″N 79°3′20″W
- Area: 1 acre (0.40 ha)
- Built: 1929
- Built by: McAlester, B.
- Architectural style: Colonial Revival
- NRHP reference No.: 05000325
- Added to NRHP: April 20, 2005

Beta Theta Pi Fraternity House, also known as the Eta chapter of Beta Theta Pi, is a historic fraternity house located at Chapel Hill, Orange County, North Carolina. The fraternity house was listed on the National Register of Historic Places on April 20, 2005.

== History ==
The Eta chapter of Beta Theta Pi was first active at the University of North Carolina at Chapel Hill (UNC) as the Star of the South chapter of the Mystical Seven fraternity from 1852 to 1859, going dormant during the Civil War. After the war, fraternities were banned on campus for several years.

The chapter was reestablished in 1884 and was absorbed by Beta Theta Pi, becoming its Eta chapter. It is one of the oldest fraternities on at UNC. In 1905, the chapter built a house on Fraternity Row, located on the edge of campus. Members first occupied the chapter house in April 1905. The new chapter house led to an increase in members, with the growth continuing until World War I.

A fire destroyed three of the houses on Fraternity Row on January 9, 1919; because of the risk to campus buildings, UNC offered a land swap to encourage the fraternities to relocate. Beta Theta Pi sold its house to Delta Sigma Pi. However, the former Beta chapter house was destroyed in a fire on December 12, 1929.

Beta Theta Pi purchased the George Pickard house on Columbia Street for $25,000 on May 28, 1925. The fraternity moved into the Pickard house in September 1925. In 1926, the Pickard house was moved to the rear of the property to make way for a new chapter house; it was divided into small units for future use as an income-generating rental property. However, construction of the new chapter house was delayed. The drawings were prepared in December 1927. The chapter moved into its new house in 1929. The Beta Theta Pi Fraternity House cost around $50,000 ($909,305 in 2022 money).

During World War II, the chapter house was used as quarters for midshipmen who were training at UNC. Both the university and the fraternity expanded during the 1950s and 1960s. However, the fraternity's membership and financial resources declined during the Vietnam War era and the 1980s.

In the summer of 1988, there was a fire in the house, which was empty at the time. The fire was started by a torch being used to remove paint and caused $2,000 in damages. The house was undergoing $100,000 in general renovations. In the 1990s, Beta Theta Pi alumni started a campaign to renovate and update the chapter house to current building codes.

The fraternity house was listed on the National Register of Historic Places on April 20, 2005. The house is also part of the West Chapel Hill Historic District.

== Architecture ==
Beta Theta Pi Fraternity House is located at 114 S. Columbia Street in Chapel Hill, North Carolina. According to its blueprints, it was built or designed by B. McAlester of Columbia, Missouri. The architect is unknown; it may have been a stock plan created by McAlester. The drawings were prepared in December 1927. The Chapel Hill News reported that the same contractor that constructed the Beta Theta Pi Fraternity House also built the Phi Delta Theta and Pi Kappa Phi chapter houses around the same time.

Beta Theta Pi is a 2 1/2-story brick structure with a basement. With its wings, the house is 9,000 square feet (840 m^{2}). It features five bays by three bays and has a modified side-gambrel roof. The house is in the Southern Colonial Revival style and features a full-width, flat-roof portico with Doric order columns. The Greek letters ΒΘΠ are affixed to the portico. There are sidelights on either side of the front door, which is topped by a transom and keystone. In addition, four sets of French doors open to the portico. The chapter house's second-story windows feature flat brick arches with keystones. The front view of the attic level has five pedimented dormers.

Inside, the central structure includes an entry hall, a living room, a trophy room, and a stairway (replaced in 1962). The living room has an original brick wall, quarry tile flooring, and a wooden fireplace mantel with paneled pilasters. The basement has a kitchen, dining room, chapter room, and storage. The second and third floors include dormitory rooms; there are a total of 21 bedrooms in the house.

The central building is flanked by lower 2 1/2-story, brick wings with gambrel roofs. The windows of the wings match the main house. The north wing originally had a recessed porch with openings that were rounded arches; these were replaced with a fanlight and French door. The south wing was originally a porte-cochere and openings that were round arches. It was expanded from one story to 2 1/2 stories around 1962; the opening was filled with fanlights and French doors, making it match the north wing from the exterior. However, it has an exterior metal fire escape. The south wing includes a television room.

To the rear of the property, there is a frame annex and deck, constructed in 1962. It was added as a social hall and is not a contributing building to the National Register status. The chapter house's windows were replaced in 1988. In 1997, the house was renovated under architect Arthur Cogswell Jr. of Chapel Hill, a fraternity member. This project included adding fire suppression sprinklers.

== See also ==
- North American fraternity and sorority housing
