= Redan High School =

Public secondary school in Redan, Georgia, United States

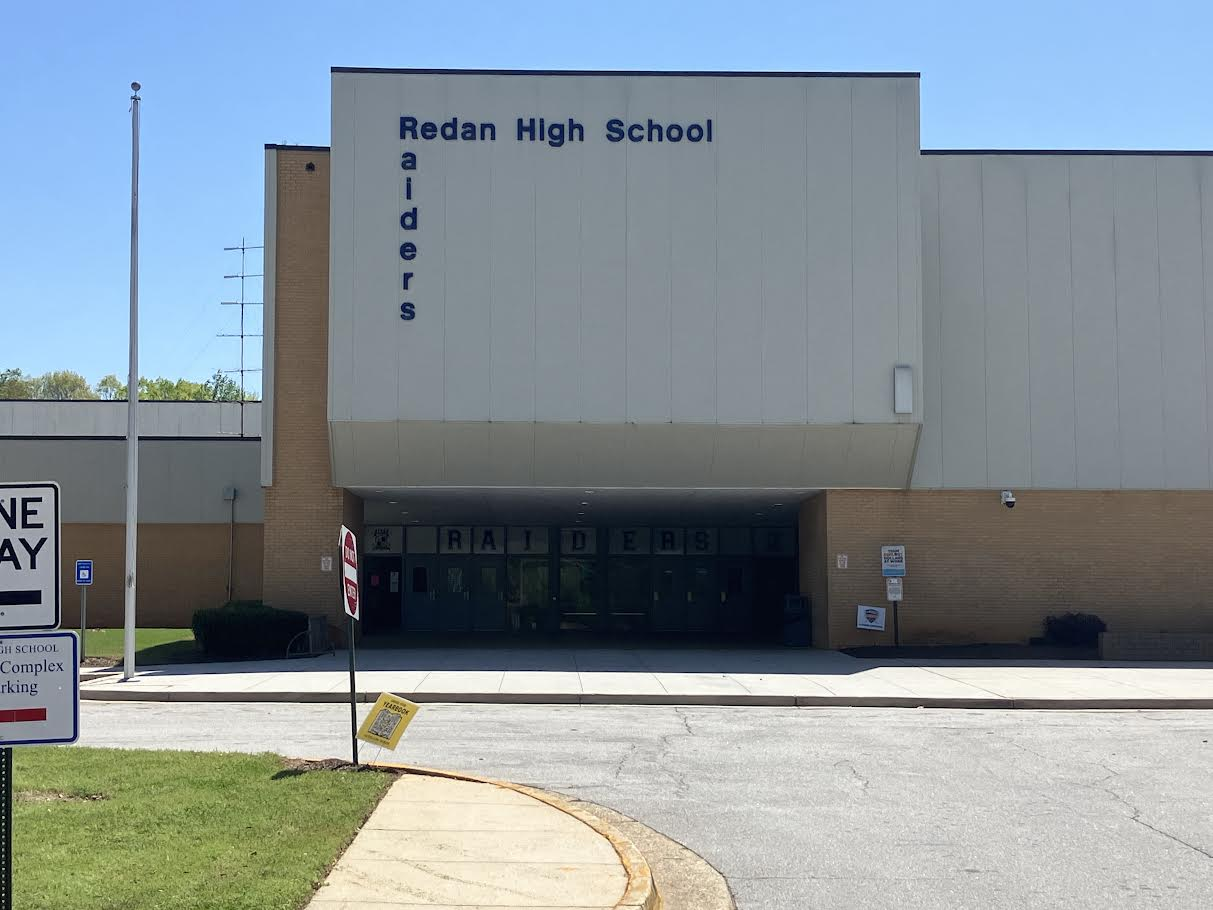
- Front of School(April 2025)

Location
- 5247 Redan Rd; Stone Mountain, Georgia 30088; United States; 33°45′31″N 84°10′41″W

Information
- Type: Public
- Motto: Breaking the spirit of average
- Established: 1976
- Principal: Tuqwan Taylor
- Teaching staff: 50.00 (FTE)
- Grades: 9–12
- Enrollment: 951 (2022–2023)
- Student to teacher ratio: 19.02
- Campus: Suburban
- Colors: Navy and silver
- Mascot: Raiders
- Affiliations: DeKalb County School District
- Website: Redan High School

Redan High School is a public secondary school of the DeKalb County School District located in Redan, Georgia.

Redan was established in 1976 by the DeKalb County School District. The school's mascot is the Raider. Both Redan High School and its "twin," Stone Mountain High School, were built without any main windows on their exteriors (except for in the main common area). The windowless construction was for energy-saving purposes during the "energy crunch" of the mid-to-late 1970s.

As part of the DeKalb County School District, the school is accredited through AdvancED through 2022.

== Campus ==
The school is in Redan, a census-designated place in unincorporated DeKalb County, Georgia, United States. The school is south of the city of Stone Mountain and has a Stone Mountain mailing address.

== Marching band ==
The Redan High School "Blue Thunder" Marching Band is one of the largest high school marching bands in the state of Georgia and in the southeast. The band has won the national VH1 Save the Music Battle of the Bands twice, the only high school band invited to perform in this competition to do so.

The band performs consistently highly in both marching band and concert band competitions, and was considered for inclusion in the inaugural parade of President Barack Obama in January 2009.

The band was featured in the blockbuster movie Drumline and the Disneyland Christmas parade, and shot a live commercial while performing at the Atlanta Football Classic. The band has recorded live commercials for several Fortune 500 companies and featured on releases by a number of recording artists. In November 2009, the Marching Blue Thunder was asked to perform in the movie Stomp the Yard 2: Homecoming, released in 2010.

The band has performed for many college and university halftime shows, including the Florida A&M Homecoming Celebration, Jackson State University, Bethune–Cookman University, Norfolk State University, and Tennessee State University, as well as major international events including the Chinese Festival in Beijing, China.

Among traditional marching bands, the Marching Blue Thunder is currently ranked number two in the United States and in the Southeast, number one in the South, and the number one ranked "High Stepping" high school marching band in Georgia. The band earns thousands of dollars annually in scholarship and tuition funds.

== Athletics ==
The Redan baseball program has a history of producing competitive athletes who reach elite levels of play.

In 1979, Kevin Butler set a high school record with a 59-yard field goal while playing for the Redan Raiders, the same year the team won the AAA State Championship.

In 2013, the Raiders baseball team won the 4A State Championship, becoming the first all-African American team to win a baseball state championship in the state of Georgia.

The school’s Lady Raiders basketball team won the 5A State Championship in both 2009 and 2014.

== Feeder schools ==
The following elementary and middle schools feed into Redan High School:

=== Elementary ===
- Eldridge Miller Elementary School
- Shadow Rock Elementary School
- Panola Way Elementary School (partial, about 15%)
- Redan Elementary School (partial, about 45%)
- Woodridge Elementary School

=== Middle ===
- Redan Middle School
- Freedom Middle School
- Miller Grove Middle School

== Notable alumni ==
- La La Anthony - actress and television personality
- Taj Bradley - professional baseball player (Tampa Bay Rays)
- Domonic Brown - former professional baseball player (Philadelphia Phillies)
- Charles W. "Chuck" Bryant - co-host of Stuff You Should Know
- Kevin Butler - former professional football player (Chicago Bears, Arizona Cardinals)
- Urso Chappell - graphic designer, writer, and World's Fair historian
- Cyhi the Prynce - rapper
- Danger Mouse - Grammy Award-winning producer
- Chris Gardocki - former college and professional football player (Clemson Tigers, Chicago Bears, Indianapolis Colts, Cleveland Browns, Pittsburgh Steelers)
- T. J. Hassan - actor
- Milt Hill - former professional baseball player (Cincinnati Reds, Atlanta Braves, Seattle Mariners)
- Jagged Edge - R&B group
- Wally Joyner - former professional baseball player (California Angels, Kansas City Royals, San Diego Padres, Atlanta Braves); former assistant hitting coach for the Philadelphia Phillies and Detroit Tigers
- Terance Mathis - former professional football player (New York Jets, Atlanta Falcons, Pittsburgh Steelers)
- Chris Nelson - former professional baseball player (Colorado Rockies, New York Yankees, Los Angeles Angels, San Diego Padres)
- Brandon Phillips - professional baseball player (Cleveland Indians, Cincinnati Reds)
- Silentó - rapper
- Armond Smith - former professional football player (Carolina Panthers, Cleveland Browns)
- Everett Stull - former professional baseball player (Montreal Expos, Atlanta Braves, Milwaukee Brewers)
- Natasha Trethewey, United States Poet Laureate 2012–2014, awarded the 2007 Pulitzer Prize for Poetry; Poet Laureate of Mississippi
