= Chappel (disambiguation) =

Chappel is a village and civil parish in the City of Colchester district of Essex, England.

Chappel may also refer to:

- Chappel, Georgia, U.S., unincorporated community
- Chappel, Texas, U.S., unincorporated community
- Chappel Island, Antarctica

== People with the surname ==
- Alonzo Chappel (1828–1887), American historical painter
- Brian Chappel (1895–1964), British major-general
- Doug Chappel (born 20th century), Australian comedian
- John Chappel (active 1637–1639), Irish dean
- Tim Chappel (born 1966 or 1967), Australian costume designer
- Tony Chappel (born 1960), Welsh snooker player
- William Haighton Chappel (1860–1922), British Anglican priest and educator

== See also ==
- Chapel (disambiguation)
- Chappell (disambiguation)
- Chapple (disambiguation)
