= Chris Gardocki =

American football player (born 1970)

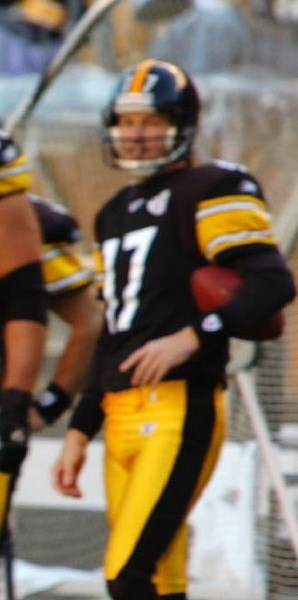
- Gardocki with the Pittsburgh Steelers in 2006

No. 17
- Position: Punter

Personal information
- Born: February 7, 1970 (age 56); Stone Mountain, Georgia, U.S.
- Listed height: 6 ft 1 in (1.85 m)
- Listed weight: 192 lb (87 kg)

Career information
- High school: Redan (Redan, Georgia)
- College: Clemson
- NFL draft: 1991: 3rd round, 78th overall pick

Career history
- Chicago Bears (1991–1994); Indianapolis Colts (1995–1998); Cleveland Browns (1999–2003); Pittsburgh Steelers (2004–2006)

Awards and highlights
- Super Bowl champion (XL); First-team All-Pro (1996); Second-team All-Pro (2000); Pro Bowl (1996); 2× NFL punting yards leader (1999, 2000); Second-team All-American (1990); Third-team All-American (1989); 2× First-team All-ACC (1989, 1990)

Career NFL statistics
- Punts: 1,177
- Punting yards: 50,336
- Punting average: 42.8
- Longest punt: 72
- Inside 20: 322
- Stats at Pro Football Reference

Christopher Allen Gardocki (born February 7, 1970) is an American former professional football player who was a punter in the National Football League (NFL). He played for the Chicago Bears, the Indianapolis Colts, the Cleveland Browns, and the Pittsburgh Steelers from 1991 to 2006. He won Super Bowl XL with the Steelers.

== Early life ==
Gardocki played as the quarterback, kicker, and punter for Redan High School in Stone Mountain, Georgia. He declared for the NFL after his junior year at Clemson University.

== Professional career ==
Gardocki was selected in the third round of the 1991 NFL draft by the Chicago Bears with the 78th overall pick. Through the end of the 2006 NFL regular season, Gardocki holds the NFL record for most consecutive punts (1,177 for his career) with no blocks. Gardocki averaged a career-best 45.7 yards per punt for the Colts in 1996 and was selected for the Pro Bowl. After playing for both AFC North rivals Cleveland and Pittsburgh, Gardocki was released by the Steelers on May 23, 2007, less than a month after the team selected Baylor punter Daniel Sepulveda in the 2007 NFL draft.

Gardocki is best remembered by some for an incident while playing for the Browns in a September 2000 game against the Steelers in Cleveland Browns Stadium. After being tackled by Steelers linebacker Joey Porter following a punt that left Gardocki briefly motionless (Porter would be penalized for roughing the punter), Gardocki flipped the middle finger twice to Steelers head coach Bill Cowher. The incident, caught on live television, resulted in a $5,000 fine for Gardocki.

== NFL career statistics ==
Legend
	Won the Super Bowl
	Led the league
**Bold**	Career high

Year	Team	Punting									
Year	Team	GP	Punts	Yds	Net Yds	Lng	Avg	Net Avg	Blk	Ins20	TB
1992	CHI	16	79	3,393	2,862	61	42.9	36.2	0	19	9
1993	CHI	16	80	3,080	2,925	58	38.5	36.6	0	**28**	2
1994	CHI	16	76	2,871	2,466	57	37.8	32.4	0	23	9
1995	IND	16	63	2,681	2,105	69	42.6	33.4	0	16	7
1996	IND	16	68	3,105	2,652	61	**45.7**	**39.0**	0	23	2
1997	IND	16	67	3,034	2,423	**72**	45.3	36.2	0	18	6
1998	IND	16	79	3,583	2,932	62	45.4	37.1	0	23	10
1999	CLE	16	106	4,645	3,663	61	43.8	34.6	0	20	**11**
2000	CLE	16	**108**	**4,919**	**4,026**	67	45.5	37.3	0	25	5
2001	CLE	16	99	4,249	3,422	69	42.9	34.6	0	25	9
2002	CLE	16	81	3,388	2,860	59	41.8	35.3	0	27	6
2003	CLE	16	72	3,019	2,503	60	41.9	34.8	0	18	10
2004	PIT	16	67	2,879	2,507	61	43.0	37.4	0	24	6
2005	PIT	16	67	2,803	2,327	65	41.8	34.7	0	22	7
2006	PIT	16	65	2,687	2,388	56	41.3	36.7	0	11	4
Career		244	1,177	50,336	42,061	72	42.8	35.7	0	322	103

== Personal life ==
Chris' wife, Sally Gardocki, is a real estate attorney. They have a son named Cole, born in 1995, and raised on Hilton Head Island, South Carolina. In 1997, Sally, an attorney and author, wrote a book titled "The Wives Room", which provided a behind-the-scenes look at the life of an NFL wife. Both donate time to several non-profit organizations including the Boys and Girls Club and the Taste of the NFL, and have regularly served turkey dinners to area residents during the holidays.

== See also ==
- List of most consecutive starts and games played by National Football League players
