= Chapel Hill, Alabama =

Chapel Hill, Alabama can refer to:

- Chapel Hill, Chambers County, Alabama, a place in Alabama, United States
- Chapel Hill, Choctaw County, Alabama, a place in Alabama, United States
- Chapel Hill, Covington County, Alabama, United States
- Chapel Hill, Jefferson County, Alabama, a place in Alabama, United States
- Chapel Hill, Walker County, Alabama, a place in Alabama, United States
- Chapel Hill, Washington County, Alabama, a place in Alabama, United States

== See also ==
- Chapel Hill (disambiguation)
