= Chappell =

Chappell may refer to:

== People ==
- Chappell (surname) includes a list of people with the surname
- Chappell Batchelor (1822–1884), English organist and cricketer
- Chappell Dossett (1883–1961), British actor
- Chappell Hayes (1948–1994), political activist
- Chappell Roan (born 1998), American singer-songwriter

== Places ==
- Chappell, Nebraska, United States
- Chappells, South Carolina, United States
- Chappell (crater) on the Moon
- Mount Chappell Island, Tasmania, Australia
- North West Mount Chappell Islet, Tasmania, Australia

== Organisations ==
- Chappell & Co., English music publisher and piano manufacturer
- Chappell of Bond Street, historic London music retailer

== See also ==
- Chapel (disambiguation)
- Chapelle (disambiguation)
- Chappel (disambiguation)
