= Faith Chapel =

Faith Chapel may refer to:

- Faith Chapel Christian Center, in Birmingham, Alabama, U.S.
- Faith Chapel (Jekyll Island, Georgia), U.S.
- Faith Chapel, SanDiego, U.S., involved in the Faith Chapel Church ritual abuse case

== See also ==
- Chapel - a Christian place of prayer and worship that is usually relatively small.
- Chapel (disambiguation)
