= Redan, Georgia =

- Unincorporated community Census-designated place
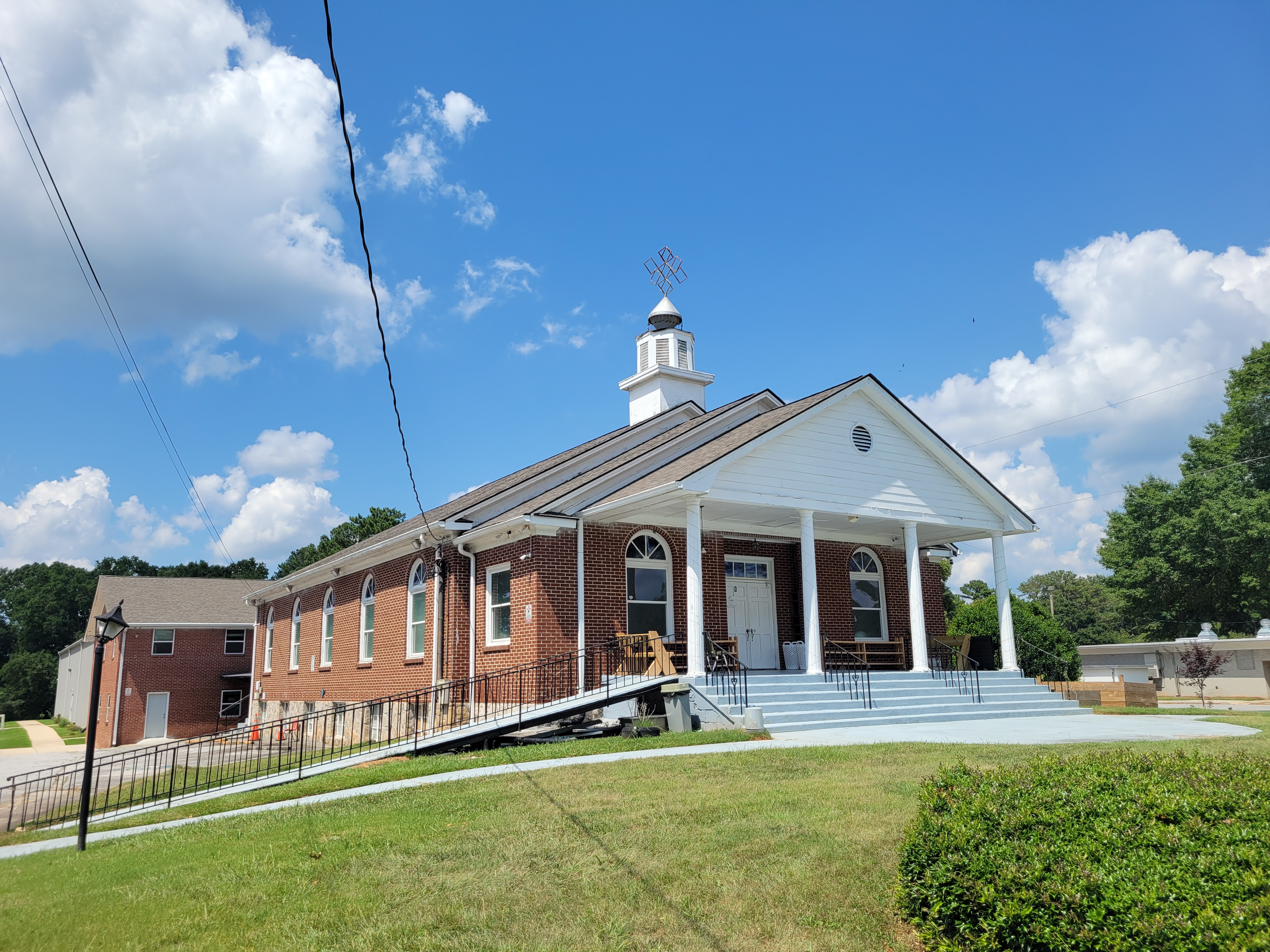
- Debre Geezan Medhanealem Eritrean Orthodox Tewahdo Church

- Location in DeKalb County and the state of Georgia

- Location in the United States
- Coordinates: 33°44′21″N 84°9′57″W
- Country: United States
- State: Georgia
- County: DeKalb

Area
  - Total: 8.13 sq mi (21.05 km^{2})
  - Land: 8.09 sq mi (20.95 km^{2})
  - Water: 0.039 sq mi (0.10 km^{2})
- Elevation: 981 ft (299 m)

Population (2020)
  - Total: 31,749
  - Density: 3,925.2/sq mi (1,515.53/km^{2})
- Time zone: UTC-5 (Eastern (EST))
  - Summer (DST): UTC-4 (EDT)
- ZIP code: 30074
- Area code: 770
- FIPS code: 13-63952
- GNIS feature ID: 0332813
- Website: www.hometownusa.com/ga/history/Redan.html

Redan is an unincorporated community and census-designated place (CDP) in DeKalb County, Georgia, United States. As of the 2020 census, the CDP had a total population of 31,749. It is a predominantly African American community in eastern DeKalb County, and is a suburb of Atlanta.

According to tradition, the name "Redan" is an amalgamation of the names of two early settlers: N. M. Reid and Annie Alford. Redan High School is located in Redan CDP, and Lithonia High School was formerly in the Redan CDP.

== Geography ==
Redan is located at 33°44′21″N 84°9′57″W (33.739256, -84.165781). According to the United States Census Bureau, the CDP has a total area of 9.6 square miles (25 km^{2}), of which 0.1 square miles (0.26 km^{2}), or 0.52%, is water.

== Demographics ==
Historical population
Census	Pop.	Note	%±
1990	24,376		—
2000	33,841		38.8%
2010	33,015		−2.4%
2020	31,749		−3.8%
U.S. Decennial Census; 1850-1870 1870-1880; 1890-1910 1920-1930; 1940 1950 1960; 1970 1980 1990; 2000 2010 2020

Redan was first listed as a census designated place in the 1990 U.S. census.

=== Racial and ethnic composition ===
Redan CDP, Georgia – Racial and ethnic composition Note: the US Census treats Hispanic/Latino as an ethnic category. This table excludes Latinos from the racial categories and assigns them to a separate category. Hispanics/Latinos may be of any race.
Race / Ethnicity (NH = Non-Hispanic)	Pop 2000	Pop 2010	Pop 2020	% 2000	% 2010	% 2020
White alone (NH)	1,791	852	804	5.29%	2.58%	2.53%
Black or African American alone (NH)	30,668	30,600	28,252	90.62%	92.69%	88.99%
Native American or Alaska Native alone (NH)	40	70	59	0.12%	0.21%	0.19%
Asian alone (NH)	237	166	236	0.70%	0.50%	0.74%
Native Hawaiian or Pacific Islander alone (NH)	9	8	7	0.03%	0.02%	0.02%
Other race alone (NH)	75	65	174	0.22%	0.20%	0.55%
Mixed race or Multiracial (NH)	418	455	1,036	1.24%	1.38%	3.26%
Hispanic or Latino (any race)	603	799	1,181	1.78%	2.42%	3.72%
Total	33,841	33,015	31,749	100.00%	100.00%	100.00%

=== 2020 census ===
As of the 2020 census, Redan had a population of 31,749 with 11,579 households and 7,143 families. The median age was 35.9 years. 23.5% of residents were under the age of 18 and 11.8% of residents were 65 years of age or older. For every 100 females there were 82.0 males, and for every 100 females age 18 and over there were 77.1 males age 18 and over.

100.0% of residents lived in urban areas, while 0.0% lived in rural areas.

There were 11,579 households in Redan, of which 32.6% had children under the age of 18 living in them. Of all households, 28.5% were married-couple households, 19.3% were households with a male householder and no spouse or partner present, and 45.0% were households with a female householder and no spouse or partner present. About 27.4% of all households were made up of individuals and 7.0% had someone living alone who was 65 years of age or older.

There were 12,195 housing units, of which 5.1% were vacant. The homeowner vacancy rate was 1.5% and the rental vacancy rate was 6.8%.

Racial composition as of the 2020 census
Race	Number	Percent
White	872	2.7%
Black or African American	28,571	90.0%
American Indian and Alaska Native	92	0.3%
Asian	245	0.8%
Native Hawaiian and Other Pacific Islander	8	0.0%
Some other race	591	1.9%
Two or more races	1,370	4.3%

== Education ==
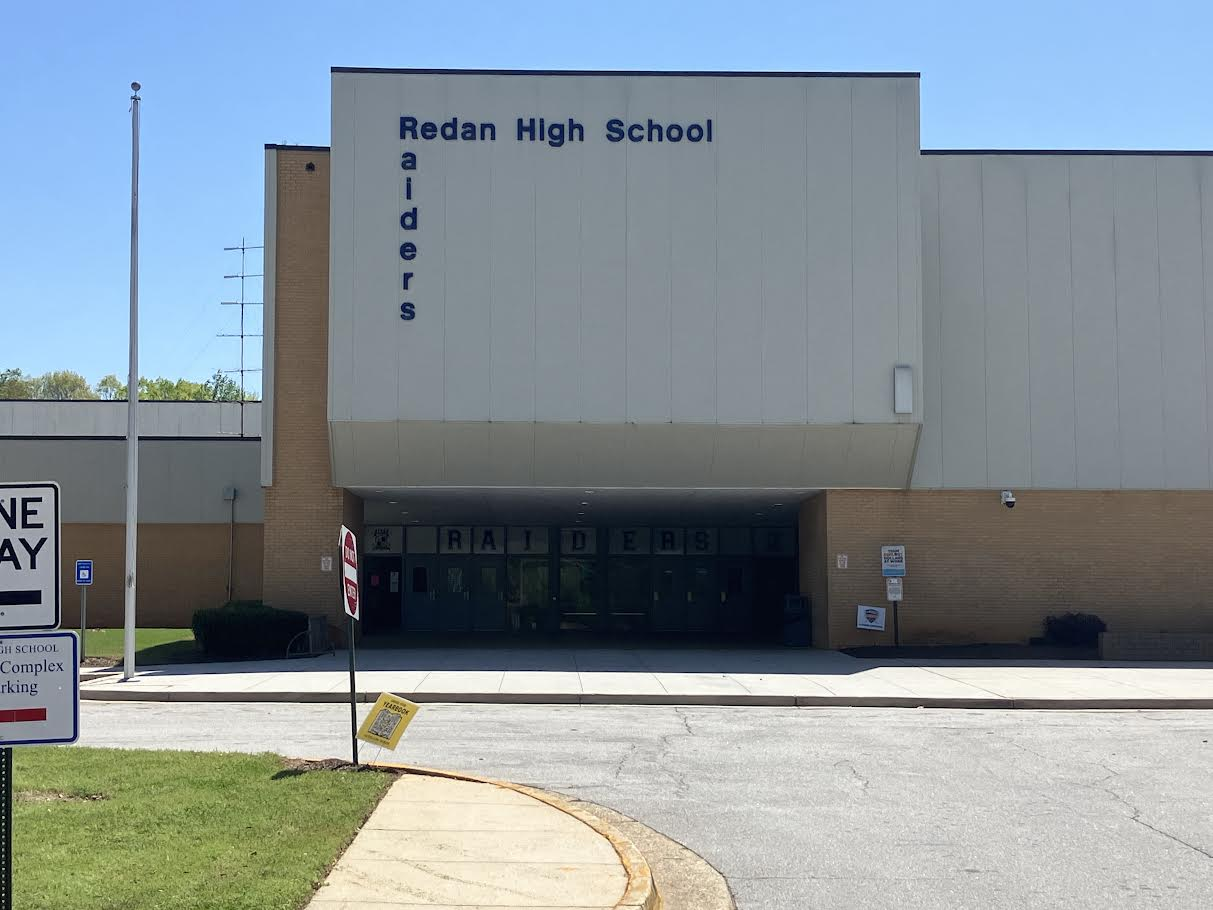
Redan High School Front (April 2025)

DeKalb County School District serves the CDP.

Elementary schools serving parts of Redan CDP:

- Redan Elementary School (Redan CDP)
- Panola Way Elementary School (Stonecrest, formerly Redan CDP as of 2010)
- Woodridge Elementary School
- E. L. Miller Elementary School
- Shadow Rock Elementary School

Some areas formerly in the CDP are zoned to Stoneview Elementary School, in Stonecrest.

Middle schools serving parts of Redan CDP:

- Redan Middle School (Redan CDP)
- Lithonia Middle School (Lithonia)
- Miller Grove Middle School

Redan High School is in Redan CDP. Lithonia High School, formerly in the CDP, is now in Stonecrest. They, along with Miller Grove High School in Stonecrest, serve portions of the CDP.

There are the following DeKalb County Public Library branches:

- Redan-Trotti
- Hairston Crossing
