= Julie Chappell =

British diplomat

Julie Louise Jo "Jules" Chappell OBE (born 2 April 1978) is a British diplomat who served as British Ambassador to Guatemala, El Salvador, and Honduras from 2009 to 2012. At age 31, she was Britain's youngest-ever ambassador.

== Early life and education ==
Chappell was born in Poole and raised in Shapwick, Dorset, and won a scholarship to St Swithun's School, Winchester. She studied Philosophy, Politics and Economics at Brasenose College, Oxford, graduating with a BA degree in 1999. She was captain of Oxford University women's lacrosse team and went on to represent England at lacrosse, winning a bronze medal at the under-19s world championship in the USA.

== Career ==
After graduating, Chappell joined the Foreign and Commonwealth Office (FCO). In 2003 she was posted to Baghdad, Iraq, as a member of the Coalition's governance team after the fall of Saddam Hussein's regime. She was appointed OBE in 2004 "in recognition of services to the reconstruction of Iraq and towards its transition to democracy."

In 2008, Chappell was appointed to be British ambassador to Guatemala, and also non-resident ambassador to El Salvador and Honduras. She took up her post in Guatemala on 28 May 2009 becoming, at the time, the United Kingdom's youngest ever ambassador at the age of 31. During her time in Guatemala, Chappell made issues surrounding domestic violence in the country a key part of her mission.

In 2012, Chappell led the GREAT Britain campaign and Emerging Powers department at the FCO, promoting the United Kingdom as a destination for international trade and tourism, subsequently being awarded a Civil Service Award for her work. A year later, in 2013, she won a Women of the Future for the Public Sector award.

in 2014, Chappell left the FCO and joined Hawthorn Advisors, a London-based communications firm specialising in finance and corporate strategy, as head of international relations. She later became a partner. She is now managing director, business, at London and Partners. Since leaving the FCO she has styled herself "Jules Chappell".

Since July 2017, Chappell has been an Advisory Board Member of the St James's Roundtable at Chatham House. She continues her promotion of women in the business and financial world; in 2016, she was named a World Economic Forum Young Global Leader. She is currently managing director, business, at London and Partners.

== Personal life ==
Chappell is married and lives in London with her two twins, Lily and Charlotte.

Chappell regularly participates in sport and is currently a member of the Clapham Lacrosse Premiership team, having the highest scoring rate of the team for the 2017/2018 season.
