= Chapel, Cumbria =

Hamlet in Cumbria, England

Coordinates: 54.673°N 3.199°W

Chapel
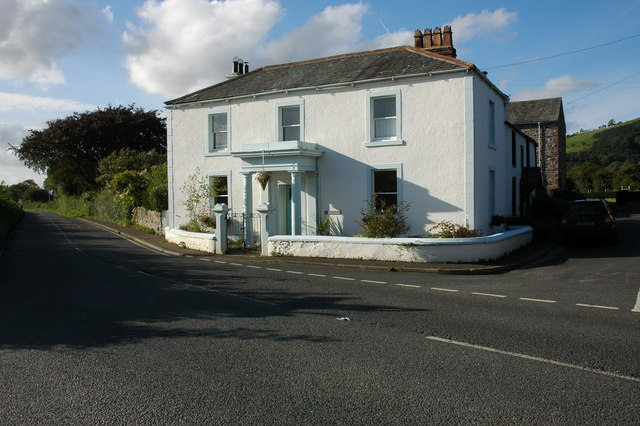
- Chapel House, Chapel

- Location in Allerdale, Cumbria Location within Cumbria
- OS grid reference: NY226315
- Civil parish: Bassenthwaite
- Unitary authority: Cumberland
- Ceremonial county: Cumbria
- Region: North West
- Country: England
- Sovereign state: United Kingdom
- Post town: KESWICK
- Postcode district: CA12
- Dialling code: 017687
- Police: Cumbria
- Fire: Cumbria
- Ambulance: North West
- UK Parliament: Penrith and Solway

Chapel is a hamlet in the English county of Cumbria.

Chapel is located on the A591 road between Bassenthwaite and Bassenthwaite Lake. The Cumbria Way crosses the main road at Chapel. Today it is a beautiful camping site and national park.
