= Chapel Island (disambiguation) =

Chapel Island is an island in the Islands of Furness, Cumbria, England

Chapel Island may also refer to:

- Chapel Island (Canada), in Bras d'Or Lake, Richmond County, Nova Scotia
  - Chapel Island 5, an Indian Reserve
  - Potlotek First Nation, or Chapel Island, a Mi'kmaw community
- Dongding Island, or Chapel Island, in the Taiwan Strait, Jinhu Township, Kinmen County, Taiwan
