= Chapel Hill Cumberland Presbyterian Church =

Historic church in Tennessee, United States

- U.S. National Register of Historic Places
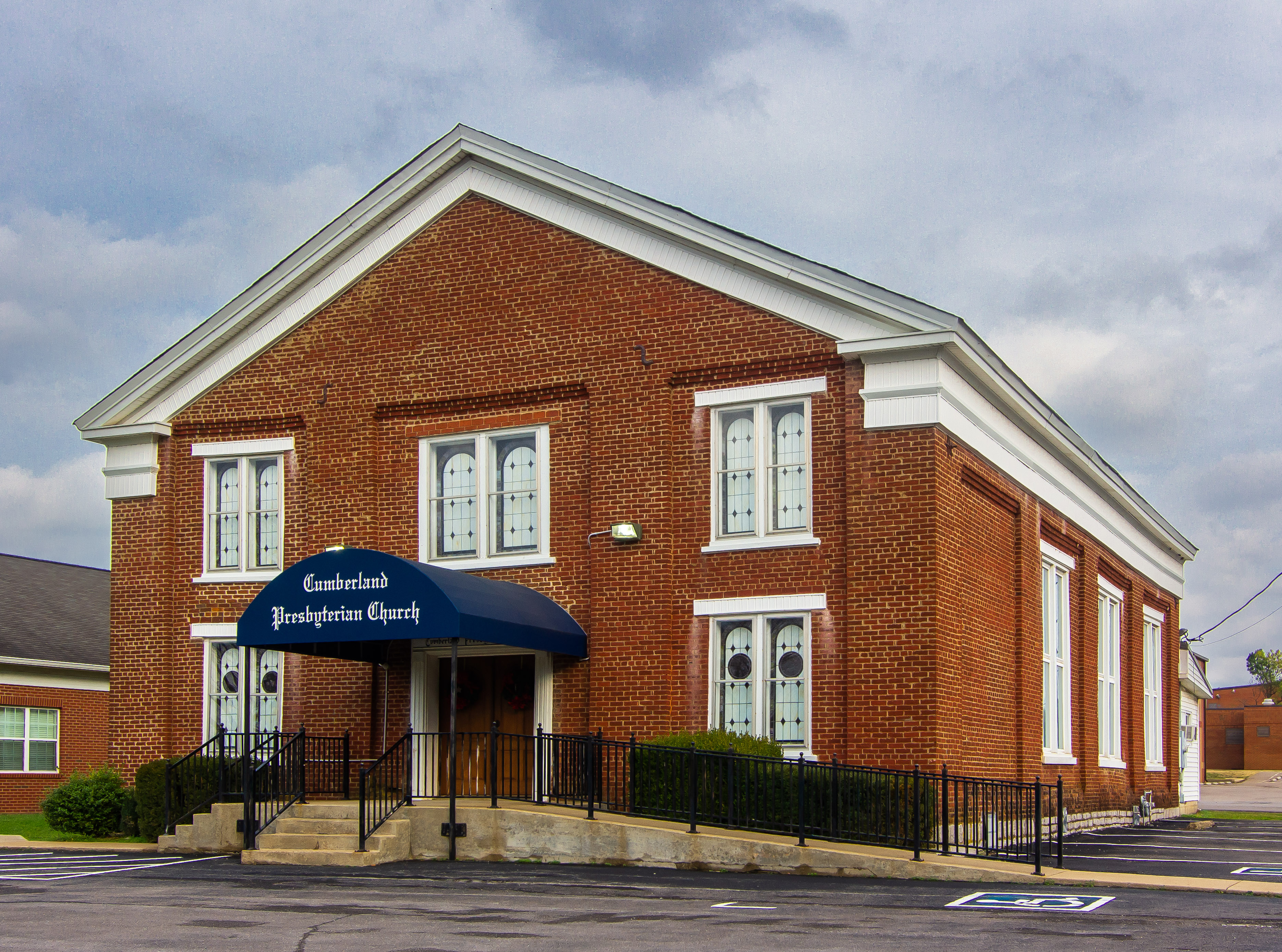

- Location within Tennessee Location within the United States
- Location: 302 N. Horton Pkwy., Chapel Hill, Tennessee
- Coordinates: 35°37′46″N 86°41′28″W
- Area: 1 acre (0.40 ha)
- Built: 1866
- Architectural style: Greek Revival
- NRHP reference No.: 85001897
- Added to NRHP: August 30, 1985

Chapel Hill Cumberland Presbyterian Church is a historic Cumberland Presbyterian church in Chapel Hill, Tennessee.

The church building, on Main Street in Chapel Hill, was built in 1866 and added to the National Register of Historic Places in 1985.
