= John Chapple =

John Chapple may refer to:

- John Chapple (Royal Navy officer) (1859–1925), British admiral and courtier
- John Chapple (British Army officer) (1931–2022), governor of Gibraltar
- John B. Chapple (1899–1989), political candidate in Wisconsin.
- John C. Chapple (1875–1946), American newspaper editor and politician
- John Boyle Chapple (1909–1990), Canadian politician
- John Starling Chapple (1840–1922), English stonemason and architect
