= William Chapple =

William Chapple may refer to:

- William Chapple (New Zealand politician) (1864–1936), member of both the New Zealand House of Representatives and the House of Commons of the United Kingdom
- Sir William Chapple (judge) (c. 1676–1745), British lawyer, judge and politician
- William Chapple (surveyor) (1718–1781), English surveyor and mathematician
- William D. Chapple (1868–1956), Massachusetts lawyer and politician

== See also ==
- William Chappell (disambiguation)
