= Chappel, Georgia =

Unincorporated community in Georgia, U.S.

Coordinates: 33°10′40″N 84°05′51″W

Chappel is an unincorporated community in Lamar County, in the U.S. state of Georgia.

== History ==
Variant names were "Chappell" and "Unionville". The community was named after H. A. Chappel.
