= Chapel Hill, New Jersey =

Populated place in Monmouth County, New Jersey, US

- Unincorporated community
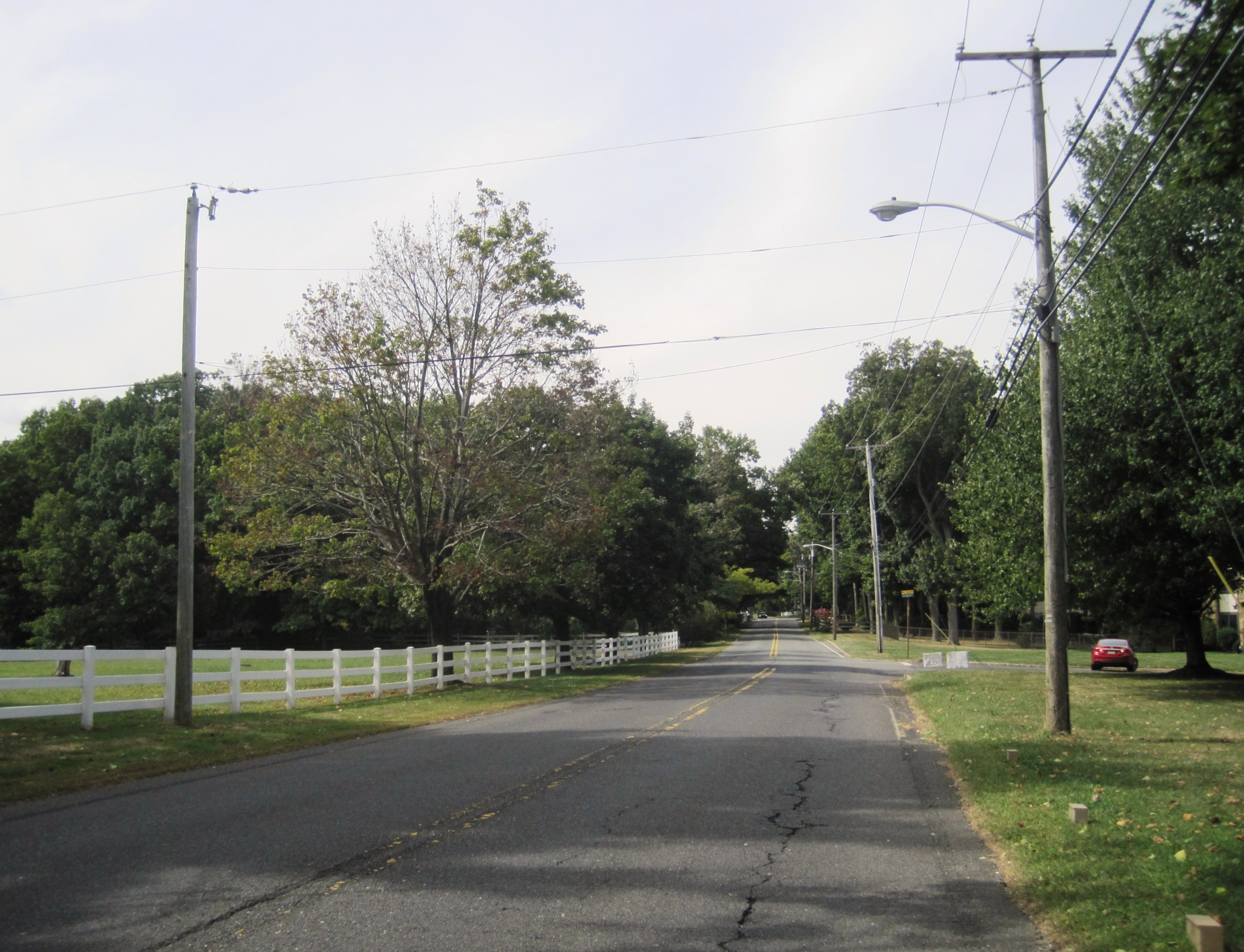
- Along Kings Highway

- Location in Monmouth County Location in New Jersey Location in the United States
- Coordinates: 40°23′50″N 74°04′14″W
- Country: United States
- State: New Jersey
- County: Monmouth
- Township: Middletown
- Elevation: 210 ft (64 m)
- Time zone: UTC−05:00 (Eastern (EST))
  - Summer (DST): UTC−04:00 (EDT)
- Area codes: 732 & 848
- GNIS feature ID: 882974

Chapel Hill is an unincorporated community located within Middletown Township, in Monmouth County, in the U.S. state of New Jersey. As its name implies, the area is on a high spot within the township between Fairview and Leonardo just south of the Naval Weapons Station Earle Waterfront Section. Unlike other areas of Middletown Township, the Chapel Hill section is not as developed with single-family homes; only a few housing developments are located off the area's main roads, Kings Highway and Chapel Hill Road. The rest of the area outside NWS Earle consists of horse farms and forestland.

The section of the township was the site of a Project Nike missile site located off Normandy Road, a road and railroad corridor connecting the two portions of NWS Earle. On May 22, 1958, an explosion of ordinances at the site killed ten workers on site. The United States Army operated the site until 1960 and all military activity ceased in 1963. A memorial to the deceased sits at nearby Fort Hancock in Sandy Hook.
