= Chapel Hill Town Hall =

- U.S. National Register of Historic Places
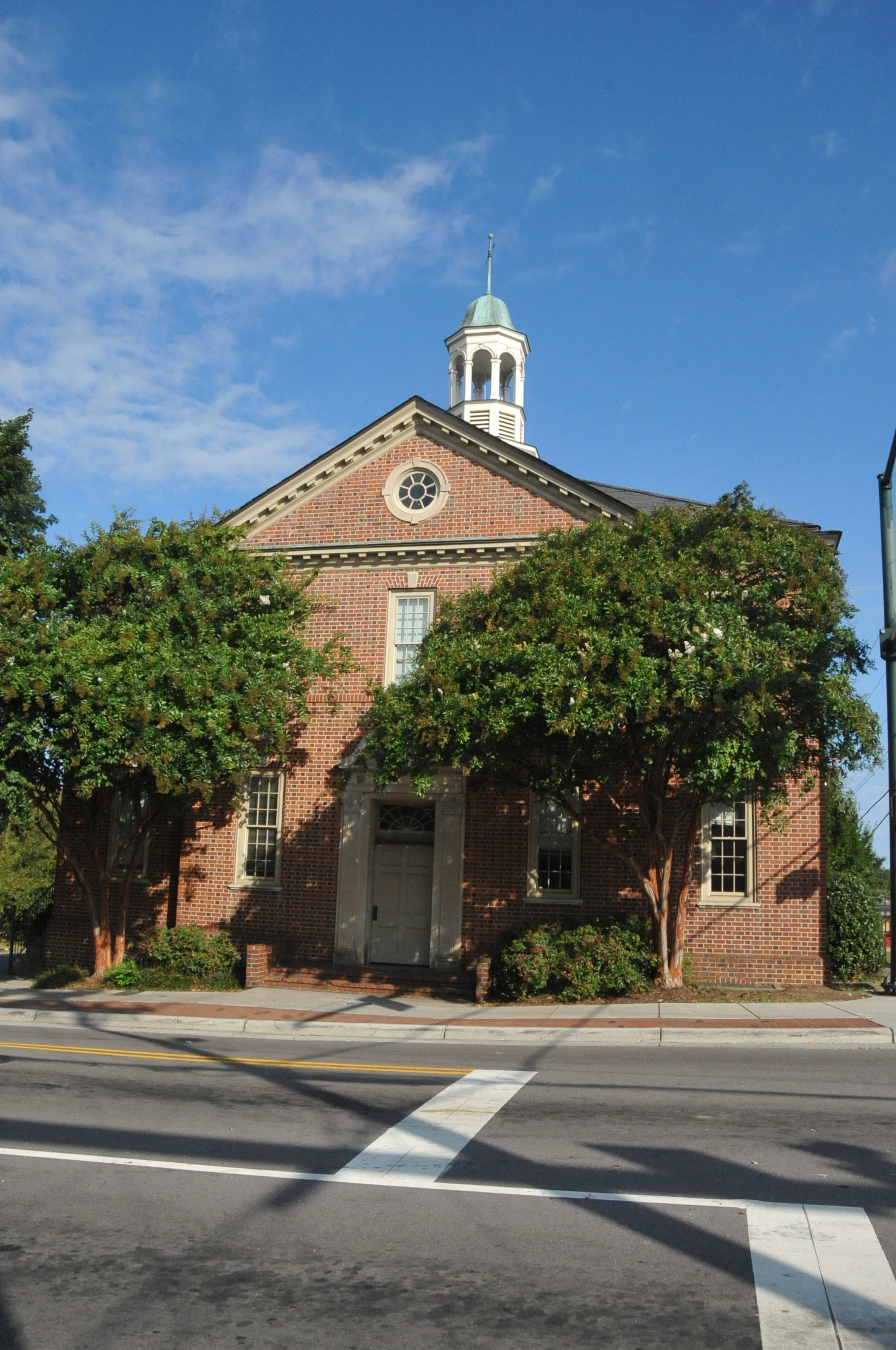

- Location within North Carolina Location within the United States
- Location: Rosemary and Columbia Sts., Chapel Hill, North Carolina
- Coordinates: 35°54′51″N 79°3′25″W
- Area: less than one acre
- Built: 1938
- Built by: Mitchell, H.F.
- Architect: Atwood & Weeks
- Architectural style: Colonial Revival
- NRHP reference No.: 90000364
- Added to NRHP: March 20, 1990

Chapel Hill Town Hall is a historic town hall located at Chapel Hill, Orange County, North Carolina. It built in 1938, and is a two-story, red brick, Colonial Revival style building. It has a full basement and a hipped slate roof topped by an octagonal wooden cupola.

It was listed on the National Register of Historic Places in 1990.
