= Sydney Chappell =

Welsh footballer

Personal information
- Full name: Sydney Chappell
- Date of birth: 13 November 1915
- Place of birth: Bridgend, Wales
- Date of death: June 1987 (aged 71)
- Place of death: Stockport, Greater Manchester, England
- Position: Half-back

Senior career*
Years	Team	Apps	(Gls)
1939	York City	1	(0)
Total		1	(0)
- * Club domestic league appearances and goals

Sydney Chappell (13 November 1915 – June 1987) was a Welsh professional footballer who played as a half-back in the Football League for York City.
