= Chapel Hill (Lexington, Virginia) =

Historic house in Virginia, United States

- U.S. National Register of Historic Places
- Virginia Landmarks Register
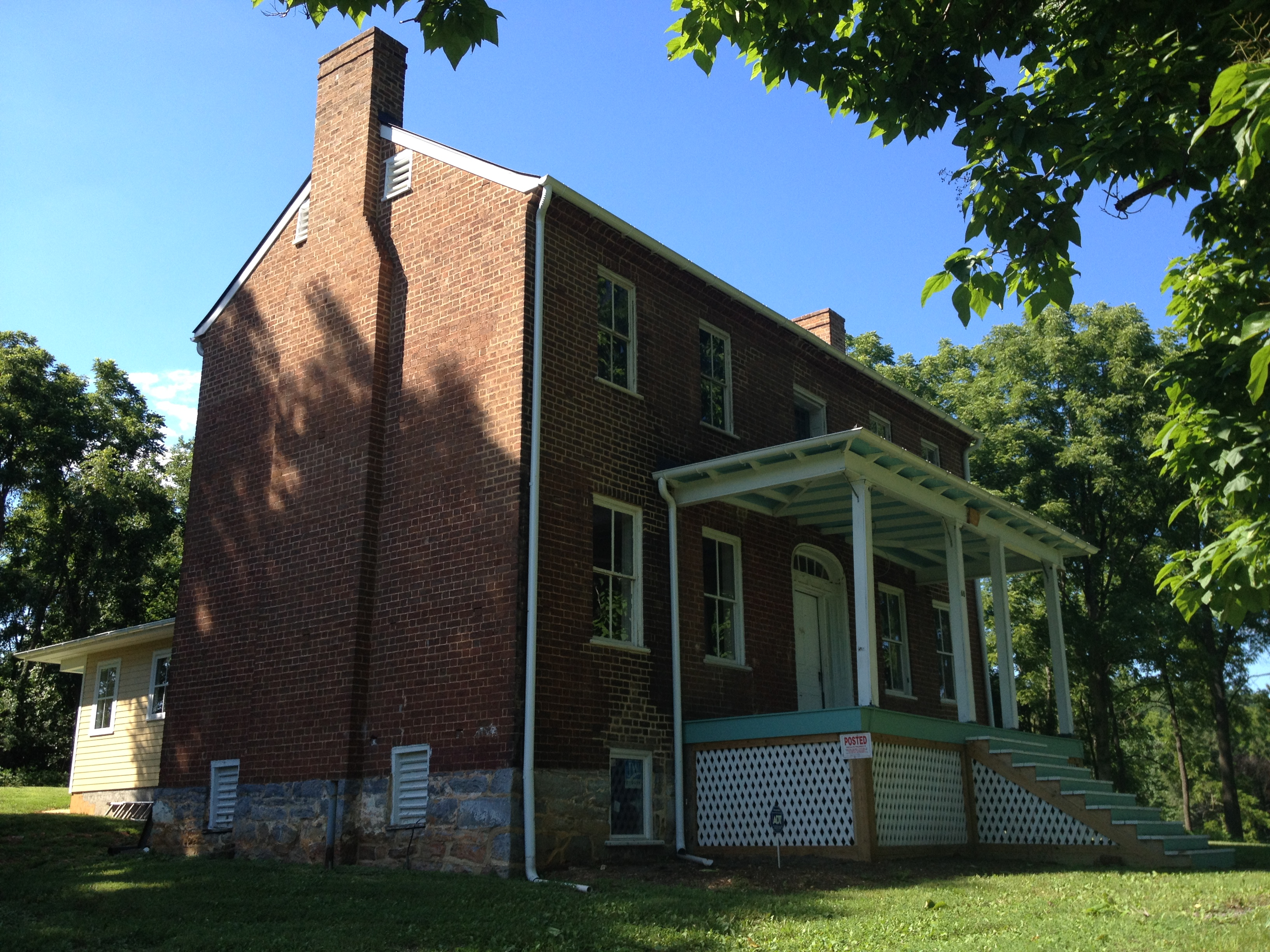

- Location within Virginia Location within the United States
- Location: 68 Charming Ln., near Lexington, Virginia
- Coordinates: 37°43′14″N 79°24′42″W
- Area: 2.3 acres (0.93 ha)
- Built: c. 1842, c. 1910
- Architectural style: Federal
- NRHP reference No.: 11000350
- VLR No.: 081-0521

Significant dates
- Added to NRHP: June 8, 2011
- Designated VLR: March 17, 2011

Chapel Hill is a historic home located near Lexington, Rockbridge County, Virginia. It was built about 1842, and is a two-story, Federal style brick dwelling. It has a lower two-story rear wing with a brick first story and weatherboard-sided second story add about 1910. It features a molded cyma recta brick cornices below a metal sheathed side-gable roof. It has highly unusual vernacular mantels and a stone chimney from a former outbuilding.

It was listed on the National Register of Historic Places in 2011.
