= William Chappell =

William Chappell may refer to:

- William Chappell (bishop) (1582–1649), English scholar and Church of Ireland bishop of Cork and Ross
- William Chappell (writer) (1809–1888), English writer on music, a member of the London musical firm of Chappell & Co
- William Chappell (Wisconsin politician) (1813–1872), Wisconsin state legislator
- William Chappell (dancer) (1907–1994), British dancer, ballet designer and producer
- Bill Chappell (1922–1989), U.S. Representative from Florida

== See also ==
- William Haighton Chappel (1860–1922), Anglican priest and educator
- William Chapple (disambiguation)
- Bill Chappelle (1881–1944), American baseball player
