= Brian Chapple =

British composer

Brian Chapple (born 1945, London) is a British composer who has won the BBC Monarchy 1000 prize and been featured on the BBC Proms. He was educated at Highgate School and studied at the Royal Academy of Music with Lennox Berkeley.

Chapple's "Hymn to God the Father", which was commissioned by Wells Cathedral for its new music festival 2014, was premiered by the Cathedral Choir on 13 May 2014.

== Compositions include ==
- Green and Pleasant, prize-winning entry for the BBC Monarchy 1000 prize in 1973
- Scherzos for four pianos
- Choral symphony In Ecclesiis
- Piano Concerto
- In The Pink
- Venus Fly Trap
- Keeping Busy
- Missa Brevis
- Tango
- Little Symphony
- Lamentations of Jeremiah
- Ave Verum Corpus
- Cantica
- Magnificat
- Songs of Innocence
- In Memoriam
- Three Motets
- Five Blake Songs
- Five Shakespeare Songs
- Five volumes of piano pieces: In the Pink, Lazy Days, On the Cool Side, Swing's The Thing, Home and Dry
- Bagatelles Diverses
- Six Bagatelles for organ
- Three Sacred Pieces
- Ecce lignum crucis
- St Paul's Service
- Burlesque
- Missa Brevis Exoniensis
- What Child is this?
- Safe where I cannot lie yet
- Praeludiana for Organ (1973)
