= Chapel Hill High School =

There are several schools in the United States called Chapel Hill High School:

- Chapel Hill High School (Chapel Hill, North Carolina)
- Chapel Hill High School (Douglasville, Georgia)
- Chapel Hill High School (Tyler, Texas)
- East Chapel Hill High School (Chapel Hill, North Carolina)
