= Urso Chappell =

American world's fair historian (1967–2020)

Urso Chappell was an American graphic designer, writer and world's fair historian born in 1967 in St Louis who died in December 2020.

He created ExpoMuseum.com in 1998 and the World's Fair Podcast in 2009. In 2004, he won the international competition to design the exterior of the Expo 2005 Linimo train. In 2010, he wrote a series of articles for China Daily about world's fairs in conjunction with Expo 2010. At Expo 2015, he created the Expo 2015+100 Archive project in conjunction with Expo 2015's social media effort. As a designer, he created many visual identities including that of ZipRealty. He supported United States membership in the Bureau International des Expositions (BIE).
