= Chapel Hill Historic District (Cumberland, Maryland) =

Historic district in Maryland, United States

- U.S. National Register of Historic Places
- U.S. Historic district
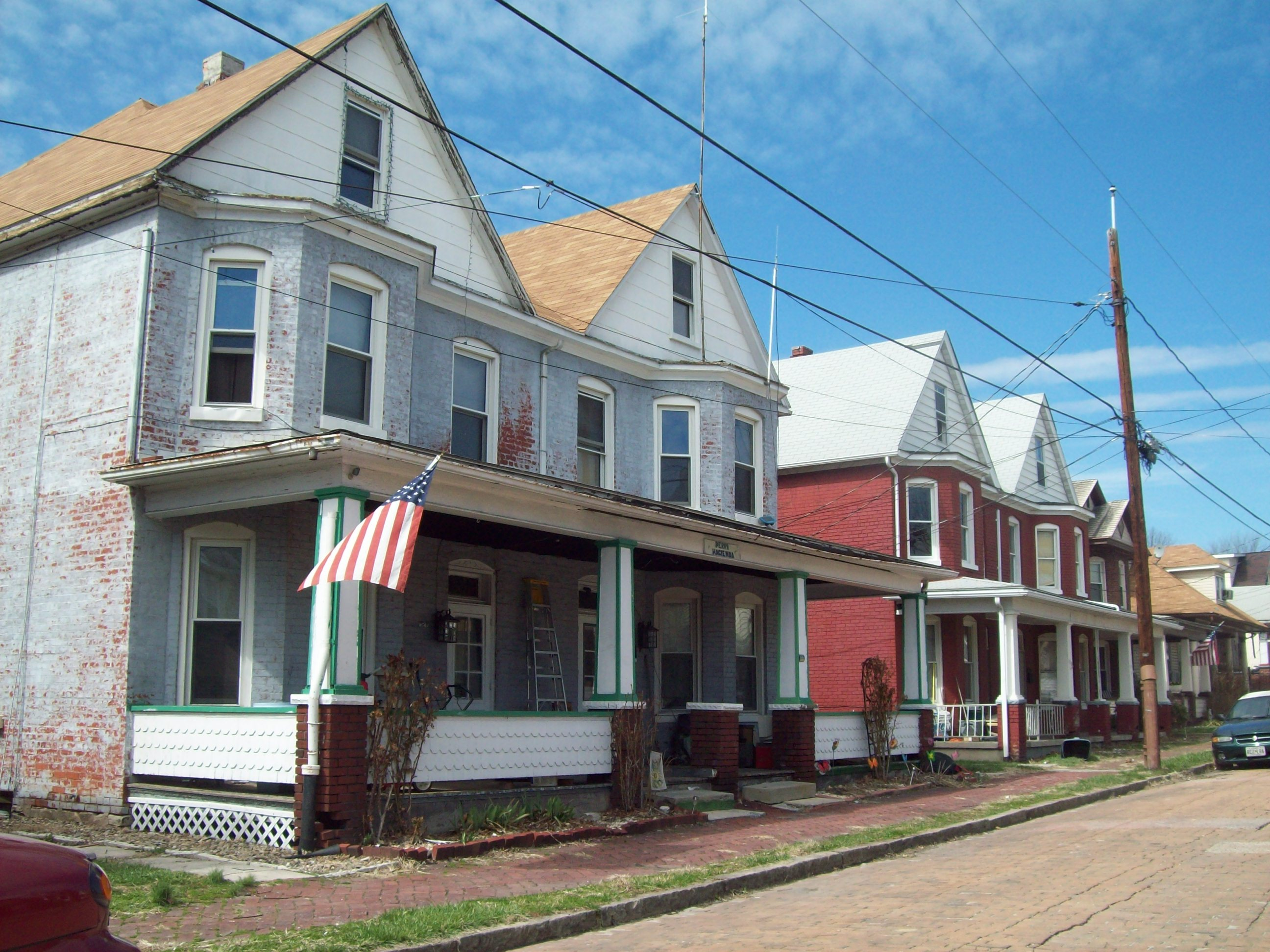
- Chapel Hill Historic District, March 2011

- Location within Maryland Location within the United States
- Location: Roughly bounded by Industrial Blvd., unnamed alley E of South St., and E. Oldtown Rd., Cumberland, Maryland
- Coordinates: 39°38′16″N 78°45′43″W
- Area: 145 acres (59 ha)
- Architect: Stansbury, George
- Architectural style: Late 19th And Early 20th Century American Movements, Federal
- NRHP reference No.: 05001477
- Added to NRHP: December 28, 2005

The Chapel Hill Historic District is a national historic district in Cumberland, Allegany County, Maryland. It is a mixed-use historic district of 810 contributing resources on 145 acres (0.59 km^{2}) located on the southeast side of Cumberland. It contains a mix of residential, commercial, and institutional buildings, with St. Mary's Roman Catholic Church on the highest point. The vast majority of the buildings were built between 1900 and 1910, and includes an extraordinary collection of double houses built for the industrial working class of the city.

It was listed on the National Register of Historic Places in 2005.
