= West Chapel Hill Historic District =

Historic district in North Carolina, United States

- U.S. National Register of Historic Places
- U.S. Historic district
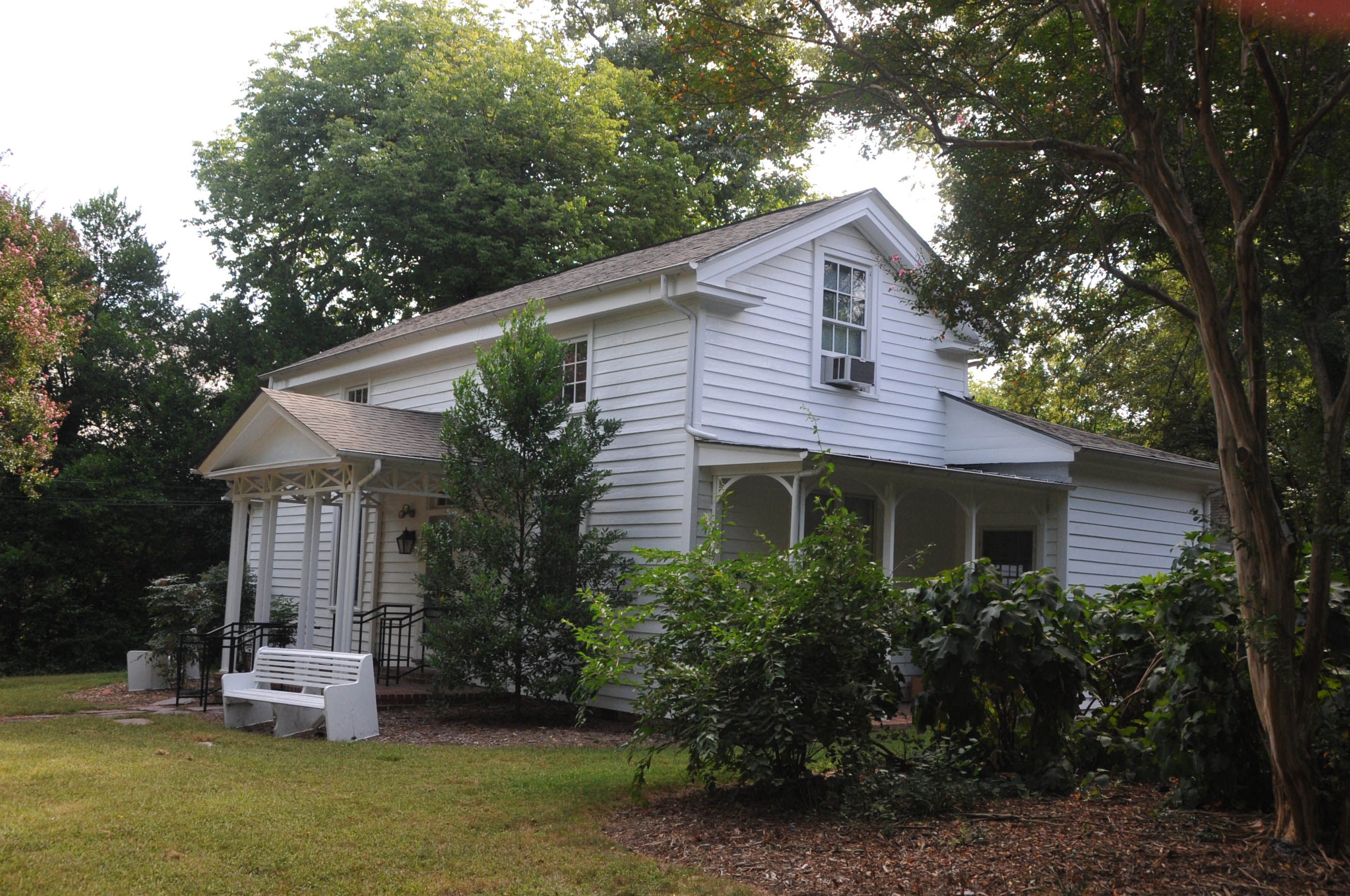
- Mallette-Wilson-Maurice House

- Location within North Carolina Location within the United States
- Location: Chapel Hill, North Carolina
- Coordinates: 35°54′23″N 79°03′31″W
- Architect: Jones, Jesse, Blackwell, James
- Architectural style: Colonial Revival, Bungalow/Craftsman, Greek Revival
- NRHP reference No.: 98001528 (original); 100003930 (increase)
- Boundary increase: May 9, 2019

The West Chapel Hill Historic District is a national historic district in Chapel Hill, North Carolina. The district comprises several small neighborhoods and is roughly bounded by West Cameron Avenue, Malette Street, Ransom Street, Pittsboro Street, University Drive and the Westwood Subdivision. The district was added to the National Register of Historic Places in 1998, and was enlarged in 2019. The district encompasses an upper-middle class residential neighborhood that developed during the nineteenth and twentieth centuries. The growth of the district is related to the development of the University of North Carolina at Chapel Hill and the town of Chapel Hill.

== Town development ==
=== 18th and 19th centuries ===
The history of the town of Chapel Hill begins with the birth of the University of North Carolina at Chapel Hill when local settlers donated 1,386 acres of land to the North Carolina General Assembly to encourage the selection of Chapel Hill to be the location of a university. The university was chartered by the General Assembly on December 11, 1789, and opened its doors for instruction in 1795.

In the first part of the nineteenth century, the village grew slowly, but experienced more rapid growth in the 1850s as funding and enrollment of the university expanded. Also, in 1851, Chapel Hill as a town was incorporated; the district was included within the town limits. Until the incorporation of the town and consequently the district, the area west of the university was considered an outlying area. Most residential development occurred around Franklin Street and Rosemary Lane, which were Chapel Hill's two main streets at the time.

=== Early 20th century ===
In the 1900s, many new residents came to the town to work and start businesses, and a public school system was established and began operating in 1909. After 1900, the growth of the university resulted in the influx of faculty families, and the residential neighborhoods comprising West Chapel Hill provided dwellings and land to accommodate them. The economic base of Chapel Hill has always been centered on education, and the town's leading citizens have been professors, many of whom bought and sold land as a hobby. These professors bought, developed and sold land at a profit. Other citizens who had prominent positions in politics, banking and mercantile trades became attracted to the area in the early twentieth century, making the town and specifically the neighborhoods within the West Chapel Hill Historic District home to Chapel Hill's wealthiest citizens.

==== Emergence of urban planning philosophies ====
Communities throughout the United States began to focus on improving currently developing residential suburbs as a result of the City Beautiful Movement, which followed the 1893 Chicago World's Fair. The movement itself emphasized the positive effect of beautiful city spaces on human behavior. During the 1920s, the neighborhood's growth was influenced by the movement and is exhibited by the large lawns and other park-like amenities and walkways featured around many of the houses built during this era.

The Neighborhood Movement also emerged in the 1920s and was based on the idea that attractive and stimulating neighborhood environments positively affected and shaped human behavior. This philosophy spurned neighborhood planning and resulted in the land along McCauley and Vance Streets being subdivided into smaller and more regularly sized lots than those along West Cameron Avenue.

==== Great Depression ====
The Great Depression negatively influenced Chapel Hill's economy in the form of a reduced university appropriation (25% of its 1928 budget in 1929, 20% of that in 1930, and 22% in 1932). As a result, professors' salaries were reduced and supplemented their lower income by renting rooms to students. In 1935, the university appropriation was reinstated to 1929 levels, and residential construction improved. The town continued to grow as the university expanded in order to accommodate new businesses, which resulted in increased demand for housing.

Between 1933 and 1937, professor and developer W.F. Prouty subdivided lots in the Westwood area. Westwood Drive, which forms a loop beginning and ending at South Columbia Street, was the first street to be developed. In 1950, the town limits expanded for the first time since 1851. The following year, the Westwood area was annexed into the town of Chapel Hill on December 25.

=== Late 20th century and today ===
The population of Chapel Hill grew from 9,177 people in 1950 to 25,573 people in 1970 (Footnote 13 - Amy's source eval 1 book). According to the 2010 U.S. census, there were 57,233 people in 20,564 households. This population boom was largely due to continued growth of the university, as well as the establishment of Research Triangle Park. Today, the continuous flow of students, faculty and staff into Chapel Hill and their demand for housing near the University of North Carolina at Chapel Hill campus maintains the link between the West Chapel Hill Historic District and the university.

== Main Streets ==
Within the West Chapel Hill Historic District, there are two main streets: Cameron Avenue and McCauley Street. Both streets were named for prominent citizens of Chapel Hill.

=== Cameron Avenue ===
Cameron Avenue is a road that runs through the University of North Carolina at Chapel Hill campus and divides McCorkle Place and Polk Place. The street was named Cameron Avenue in 1885 in recognition of Paul Carrington Cameron. Previously, the street was referred to as "College Avenue" and was the southern boundary of the university's campus. After the university closed during Reconstruction on December 1, 1870, Cameron worked to reopen the university in 1875. Cameron lived in Chapel Hill during the mid-nineteenth century and became the richest man in the state due to investments in real estate. Cameron also made a loan to the university to complete the construction of Memorial Hall. In the 1880s, Cameron Avenue was extended west, beyond the campus, and subsequently became a main artery of what is now the West Chapel Hill Historic District.

=== McCauley Street ===
McCauley Street is a road that runs through a residential neighborhood west of the University of North Carolina at Chapel Hill campus. The street is named after David McCauley, who was a prominent merchant and the largest landowner in Chapel Hill by 1875. McCauley was the great-grandson of William and Matthew McCauley, who were original donors of land given to help found the university. McCauley named the street after himself. He also named Vance Street and Ransom Street, both of which are located within the West Chapel Hill Historic District. McCauley named the streets after two of his favorite Democratic politicians, Governor Zebulon Vance and Dr. Edward Ransom, a prominent legislator.

== Architecture ==
The district consists mainly of residential buildings constructed between 1845 and 1948. The dwellings built within the district exhibit some of the following architectural styles: Colonial Revival, Craftsman Bungalow, Tudor Revival, Queen Anne and Ranch.

=== Houses ===
There are 12 historic houses in the West Chapel Hill Historic District as recognized by the NRHP:

1. John O'Daniel
  Address: 237 McCauley Street
  Date Built: 1900
  Architectural Style: Queen Anne cottage, exhibits transition to Colonial Revival with classical porch
2. Webb House (Caldwell-Mitchell House)
  Address: 211 McCauley Street
  Date Built: 1913
  Architectural Style: Colonial Revival
3. Dewitt Neville House
  Address: 311 Patterson Place
  Date Built: 1927
  Architectural Style: Craftsman Bungalow
4. United Church of Christ
  Address: 211 W. Cameron Avenue
  Date Built: 1914
  Architectural Style: Gothic Revival
5. Pool-Harris House
  Address: 206 W. Cameron Avenue
  Date Built: 1870
  Architectural Style: Late-Nineteenth Century
6. Mallette-Wilson-Maurice House
  Address: 215 W. Cameron AvenueDate Built: 1845
  Architectural Style: Late-Nineteenth Century
7. Scott-Smith-Gattis House
  Address: 400 W. Cameron Avenue
  Date Built: 1860
  Architectural Style: Late-Nineteenth Century
8. Mason-Lloyd Wiley House
  Address: 412 W. Cameron Avenue
  Date Built: 1860
  Architectural Style: Late-Nineteenth Century
9. Pool-Harris Patterson House
  Address: 403 W. Cameron Avenue
  Date Built: 1870
  Architectural Style: Late-Nineteenth Century
10. Warriole-Tilley House
  Address: 113 Mallette Street
  Date Built: 1890–1900
  Architectural Style: Late-Nineteenth Century
11. Morris-Gore-Hocutt House
  Address: 117 Mallette Street
  Date Built: 1850
  Architectural Style: Late-Nineteenth Century
12. Sallie Davis-Clyde Eubanks House
  Address: 129 Mallette Street
  Date Built: 1880
  Architectural Style: Late-Nineteenth Century
