= Liberal Arts and Science Academy =

Liberal Arts & Science Academy

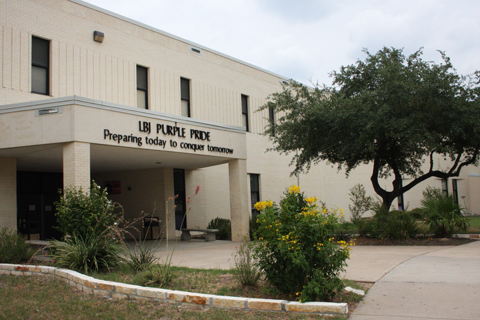
- LASA's location from 2007 to 2021 at LBJ Early College High School

Location
- 1012 Arthur Stiles Road; Austin, Texas 78721; United States

Information
- Type: Public Magnet
- Motto: Sapere aude (Dare to think)
- Established: 2007
- School district: Austin Independent School District
- CEEB code: 440069
- Principal: Stacia Crescenzi
- Grades: 9-12
- Enrollment: 1,578 (2025-2026)
- Colors: Navy & White (2020- ) Purple (2007-2020)
- Athletics conference: UIL Class 5A
- Mascot: Raptor
- USNWR ranking: 32nd
- Newspaper: The Liberator
- Yearbook: Stetson
- Website: lasa.austinschools.org

Liberal Arts and Science Academy (LASA) is a selective public magnet high school in Austin, Texas, United States. Although LASA is open to all Austin residents and charges no tuition, competition for admission can be strong and is contingent on submission of an application, prior academic record, and the Cognitive Abilities Test.

LASA is often ranked as one of the best public schools in Texas, ranking #4 by U.S. News & World Report in 2023. To apply to LASA, applicants must live inside Austin ISD boundaries.

== History ==
In 1928, the Austin City Council approved a plan to segregate the city, effectively forcing black populations to move to certain areas of the city. After a national movement for desegregation of public schools began, AISD announced that it would begin efforts to desegregate schools, even though the school district continued to not allow busing. In 1968, the U.S. Department of Justice sued AISD for not integrating schools fast enough, and after many years of litigation, school boundaries were redrawn. LBJ High School opened in 1974 as a product of this reorganization of the school system. Enrollment at LBJ steadily dropped in the years after its founding, as white parents took their kids out of public schools. This prompted the AISD school board to take further action.

In 1985, to stem white flight and create more diverse public schools, and to address demands from the Austin business community for a more skilled workforce, the Science Academy (SA) of Austin was created as a magnet program embedded within LBJ. SA students took classes in math and science with each other, but classes in other subjects with their non-magnet peers. Following the 1997 establishment of automatic admission to state-funded universities for the top 10 percent of every Texas high school's graduating class, non-magnet students at LBJ were placed at a unique disadvantage in terms of college admissions; the solution came in 2001, when a bill sponsored by Rep. Dawnna Dukes separated SA and non-magnet students at LBJ into distinct ranked lists for the purpose of determining top 10 percent eligibility. The SA was merged with Johnston High School's Liberal Arts Academy (LAA) in 2002, forming the Liberal Arts and Science Academy (LASA). At this point, the school didn't have a distinct federal ID number, and thus was still considered a part of LBJ. In 2007, so that LBJ could receive a grant from the Bill and Melinda Gates Foundation, LBJ and LASA were split into separate schools. After the split, classes besides fine arts were no longer shared, and teachers taught at either LASA or LBJ, but typically not at both. The two schools continued to share athletic programs until 2020 and fine arts programs until 2021.

=== Campus ===
LASA shared its campus with Lyndon B. Johnson Early College High School from its founding in 2007 to 2021. LASA was located on the second floor while LBJ was on the first floor. Melissa B. Taboada of the Austin American-Statesman stated in 2015 that some members of the Austin community "say the division [was] a constant blemish on the campus". As part of the Austin Independent School District's November 2017 bond, LASA relocated from the LBJ campus to the Johnston Campus, which was previously occupied by Eastside Early College High School. The campus originally opened in 1960 as Johnston High School. As part of the move, LASA chose a new mascot and school colors. The move took place in summer 2021.

== Admission ==
Admission is based on multiple criteria including grades, standardized test scores, essays, teacher recommendations, extracurricular activities, awards earned, three short answer prompts, a creative project, and an admissions exam (currently the Cognitive Abilities Test (CogAT)). The creative project portion was added in 2021. Students must be enrolled in AISD and have proof of residence to apply.

== Student body ==
As of October 2022, 43% of LASA students are white, 24.4% are Asian, 21.9% are Hispanic, 8% are of mixed race, 2.7% are African American, and 0.1% are American Indian. 13.6% of LASA students are low income. The percentages of low income, black, and Hispanic students at LASA decreased circa 2010-2015. The move to the Johnston Campus saw the school increase enrollment significantly, adding nearly 200 students between 2021 and 2023. The student to body ratio is 1 teacher to 17.2 students.

As of 2010, the school spends $3,665 per student for academic programs and $5,919 per student for all school functions.

== National Merit Finalists ==
LASA routinely has more students qualify as National Merit Scholars than the rest of AISD high schools combined.

== School rankings ==
Niche's 2022-23 rankings placed LASA at #24 nationally, #12 among magnet schools, and #2 in the state of Texas. Newsweek's Best STEM Schools 2020 ranked LASA #6 nationally and #3 in Texas. 33 out of the 293 students in the LASA Class of 2022 were National Merit Finalists.

== Traditions ==
=== Senior Assassins ===
The traditional "Senior Assassins" game was ended in 2014 after word of the game leaked to the media. The game began in 2006. Seniors would collect an entry fee, then chase each other in hallways during class breaks, trying to mark and "tag" each other with markers. A student who got marked was "dead". The last survivor claimed the cash prize. In 2013, students were injured in the hallway by running seniors. Walls were rammed and holes had to be repaired. The game finally ended that year when a male student chased a female into the women's bathroom and she complained. In 2014, the administration helped organize the game, setting additional rules. A parent alerted the media and the subsequent attention caused the district to order the principal to shut the game down. The game was restarted off-campus during the 2021–22 school year.

=== Mascot ===
The official LASA mascot is the Raptor (short for velociraptor), dubbed Blue. It was decided upon via school-wide and alumni voting in February 2020. Prior to separation from LBJ, LASA shared LBJ's mascot, the Jaguar, in University Interscholastic League and other collaborative events across the schools.

=== Culture Festival ===
Since 2016, LASA's student-run Diversity Council has hosted an annual "Culture Festival" (or culture fest) supported by the administration. Early in the spring semesters, students spend a half-day of school engaging in activities dedicated to learning about other cultures. This time is spent attending events run by volunteer speakers, performers and teachers.

== Sports ==
LASA hosts the University Interscholastic League and intramural sports, including ultimate frisbee, golf, lacrosse, swimming, cross-country, and tennis. LASA split its UIL athletic teams from LBJ's in the 2020–2021 school year and formed its own football, basketball, and other sports teams. The school offers 18 UIL sports and 2 intramural sports.

== Clubs and student organizations ==
As of May 2024, LASA offers 150 clubs and student organizations. These vary with each school year, and students may apply to create new clubs.

=== Computer science ===
LASA{CS} clubs cater to a variety of interests within the field of computer science and includes CS Club, Women+ in Computer Science (WICS+), CyberPatriot, Hack Club, Raptor Works, and Programming in Practice.

The CS Club promotes various contests including preparing for and competing in the statewide UIL Computer Science contest. LASA has placed first in the State UIL 5A Computer Science contest a total of 7 times.

The CyberPatriot Club prepares and organizes the Cyberpatriot competitions. Many teams have been in the top tier in the state and 2 teams have qualified for nationals (for which only 12 teams out of 3000 qualify annually.

=== Debate ===
LASA's debate team competes in Policy Debate. The team is nationally ranked and has qualified a team to the Tournament of Champions every year since 2016. In 2017, LASA had their first team on the Coaches Poll and they finished the year ranked 14th. The same team made it to octofinals of the Tournament of Champions that year and won the Texas Forensic Association State Tournament and the Harvard Debate Tournament. In the final 2018 coaches poll, LASA finished the year ranked 15th in the country.

In the 2020–21 school year, the program was able to qualify 3 teams to the Tournament of Champions for the first time and a fourth team qualified via the at-large application process. That year, the team also won the Bingham Policy Invitational.

In the 2021–22 season, LASA won the Grapevine tournament and had 3 of the 4 teams in the semifinal round. In the Texas Forensic Association State Tournament, LASA was 5 of the 19 teams that made it to elimination rounds and made it to the final round. At the Tournament of Champions, they had 2 teams in octofinals, the strongest performance in school history to date. In the last coaches poll that year, LASA was ranked 7th and 9th by the best debate coaches nationwide.

In the 2022–23 season, LASA won the Grapevine tournament for the second year in a row and also won the Westminster tournament and Greenhill Classic. At the St. Marks Heart of Texas tournament, the team won the Junior Varsity and Varsity divisions. At state that year, LASA had 6 teams make it to elimination rounds and one team was in finals. Alexandrea Huang and Sam Church won the Tournament of Champions that year, becoming the first Texan public school to win the tournament.

=== Quiz Bowl ===
LASA's Quiz Bowl club won national titles at NAQT's High School National Championship titles in 2013 and 2014, as well as the PACE NSC in 2014 and 2016. They have also had numerous top 4 finishes at both tournaments. As of 2022, LASA is one of two schools to have won two National Championship titles in the Varsity Division of the National History Bowl, along with Hunter College High School in New York City.

=== Science Olympiad ===
Science Olympiad is also offered at LASA as a club. LASA placed in the top 3 in Texas every year from 2005 to 2021 and in 2023, including a streak of first-place finishes from 2007 to 2012. In 2015, the Science Olympiad team placed 3rd in Nationals.

=== K5LBJ Amateur Radio Club ===
On the air since April 2004, LASA offers an Amateur Radio Club that participates in all different aspects of the Amateur Radio Service. The club placed first in the High School division of the American Radio Relay League School Club Round-Up in 2006, 2010, 2014, 2017, and 2019.

== Curriculum ==
To graduate with LASA's magnet endorsement, students must complete a minimum of 15 magnet classes, including a minimum three years of one Language Other Than English (LOTE) or two years each of two different LOTEs, four years of English, three years of social studies, four years of math (or until they complete multivariable calculus), and four years of science. LASA offers Advanced Placement (AP) courses covering 30 Advanced Placement tests. Some AP courses, such as AP World History, AP English, and AP Physics, are mandatory for students at LASA. To add on, AP physics may be taken as Left, Right, or Whole (split). Physics Left and Right allow students to take AP Physics 1 and AP Physics 2 in the same year while Physics Whole has students take the class in 2 years. Students may begin taking AP classes in 9th grade.

Additionally, LASA high school offers specialized electives such as How To Be An Adult, Astronomy, Medical Microbiology, Biotechnology, Amateur Radio, and Modern Physics. As of 2019, LASA has 20 elective science classes, including astronomy, forensic science, and modern physics. Electives for humanities include creative writing, women's literature, amateur radio, and constitutional law.

For some classes, such as AP US History and AP Government, summer dual credit at Austin Community College may be used to gain a credit without taking the required class at LASA.

=== Languages ===
LASA offers seven languages: French, German, Latin, Japanese, Spanish, Chinese, and American Sign Language. Students are required to earn either three credits of in one language or two credits in two languages. Students who have already met their language requirement will still be required to earn a language credit at LASA.

=== Firefighting ===
LASA students are eligible to participate in the LBJ Fire Academy, a two-year firefighting and EMT training course. The Fire Academy is a Texas Commission on Fire Protection (TCFP) approved firefighter certification program and a Texas Department of State Health Services approved EMT certification program. At the time of the program's founding in 2006, it was exclusive to LBJ students. The Fire Academy later expanded to allow students from 7 AISD high schools; LASA, Anderson, Austin, McCallum, Navarro, and Northeast. Students begin the program their junior year with firefighter training, before switching to EMT coursework early in their senior year. The classes are "double-block", meaning students attend the academy for two class periods (three hours) every other day. Additional skills training is completed in 8-hour blocks on certain Saturdays. Students complete their "ride-outs" with the Austin Fire Department.

=== Computer Science ===
LASA{CS}, the computer science program at LASA, offers courses that cover Java, C++, data structures, Python, web and mobile applications, and digital electronics. Additionally, there is an independent study class to allow more advanced students to work on their own projects. There are also many computer science clubs, such as Hack Club, CS Club, Raptor Works, Programming in Practice, CyberPatriot, and Women in Computer Science (WICS).

=== Publications ===
LASA publishes its own newspaper, The Liberator, as well as its own yearbook, Stetson. The Liberator was originally LBJ's newspaper; it was named after the abolitionist newspaper published in Boston in the 1800s. With the formal separation of LASA and LBJ in 2007, The Liberator became the official newspaper of both schools. LBJ withdrew from the joint publication at the start of the 2016–17 school year, due in part to the inclusion of an offensive graphic in the newspaper's February 2016 issue. However, the schools were already beginning to separate several courses and electives by that time. Stetson was previously LBJ's yearbook. When LASA and LBJ began to share a campus, LASA produced the book for both campuses. In 2016, LBJ began its own yearbook again, and LASA kept the Stetson name.

=== Signature Courses ===
Students must take two "Signature Courses" in both their freshman and sophomore years. These Signature Courses are semester-long classes, with one period every day. Freshmen must take Introduction to Engineering ("SciTech") and Graphic Design and Illustration ("E-Zine"); sophomores take Introduction to the Humanities ("Great Ideas") and Biogeology ("Planet Earth" or "Plearth"). SciTech is an engineering course, where Freshmen will learn how to build, and also make projects. E-Zine is a graphic design class, where Freshman make a digital magazine on a topic of their choosing.
