= Lyndon B. Johnson High School (Austin, Texas) =

Coordinates: 30°18′47″N 97°39′24″W

Lyndon B. Johnson High School (LBJ)

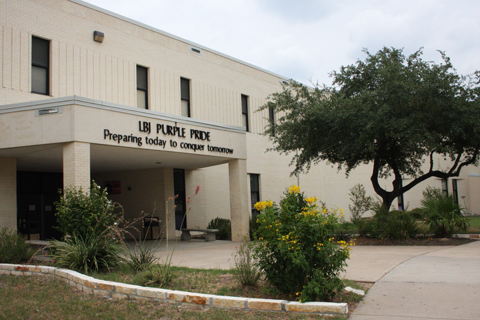

Location
- 7309 Lazy Creek Drive; Austin, Texas 78724; United States

Information
- Type: Public School
- Established: 1974
- Principal: Randy Bryant (interim)
- Teaching staff: 51.39 (FTE)
- Grades: 9–12
- Enrollment: 907 (2025–2026)
- Student to teacher ratio: 14.85
- Color: Purple
- Athletics conference: UIL Class 4A
- Mascot: Jaguar
- USNWR ranking: 16th
- Website: lbjechs.austinschools.org

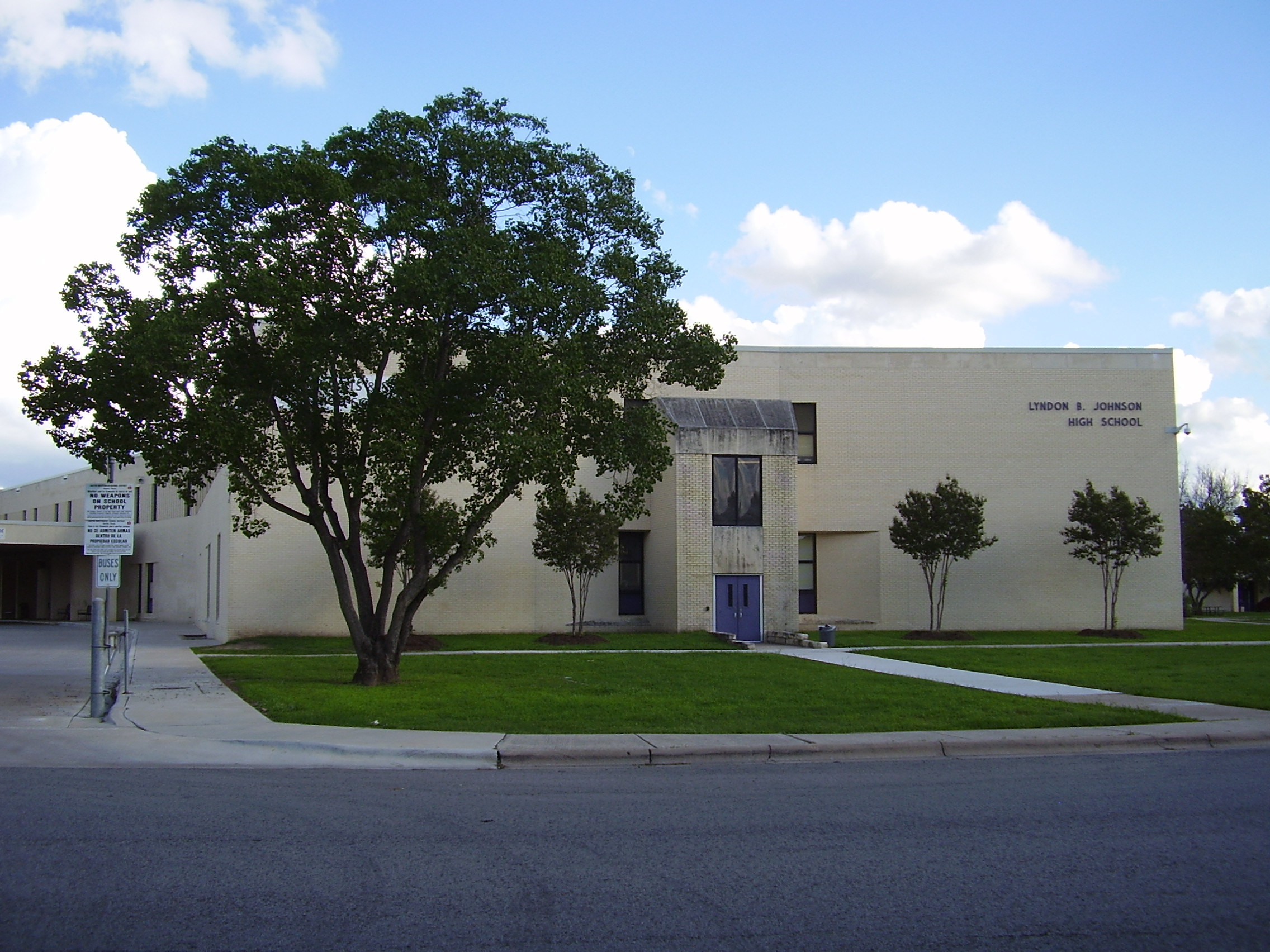
Lyndon B. Johnson Early College High School

Lyndon Baines Johnson (LBJ) Early College High School is a public high school in northeast Austin, Texas. At the time of its opening in 1974, LBJ was only the second high school in the U.S. (after the former Johnson City High School) to be named for the 36th President. In 1985, LBJ became the host of a new academic magnet program, the Science Academy of Austin (SA), which drew students from all over the city. A second high school magnet program, the Liberal Arts Academy of Austin (LAA), was opened at Albert Sidney Johnston High School in 1987; the two programs were merged in 2002, forming the Liberal Arts and Science Academy (LASA) magnet within LBJ. In 2007, the Austin Independent School District split LASA and LBJ into separate high schools with their own principals, faculty, and staff in order for LBJ to be eligible for a grant from the Bill & Melinda Gates Foundation to implement the "First Things First" educational enrichment program. After the split, LBJ and LASA were housed on the same campus, though largely on different floors. The two schools continued to share athletic teams through the end of the 2019–20 school year, but shared certain extracurricular activities and electives (band, theater, newspaper, yearbook, choir, orchestra, etc.) through the end of the 2020–21 school year. In 2011, via a partnership with the Austin Community College, LBJ established a new program through which students could earn up to 60 college credits while still in high school, earning it the "Early College High School" (ECHS) designation it bears today. In 2021, LASA relocated to the former Eastside Memorial Early College High School campus.

LBJ Early College High School's mascot is the Jaguar, and the school's colors are purple and white.

The current (interim) principal of LBJ Early College High School is Randy Bryant. Previous LBJ principals include Dr. Dorothy Orebo (1982–1992), who was the first Black woman principal of any AISD high school, Patrick Patterson (2004–2010), Sheila Henry (2012–2018, plus 2023–2024 as interim), and Dr. Joseph Welch (2021–2023).

From 2007 to 2021, the school occupied the first floor of its campus, while LASA was on the second floor. Melissa B. Taboada of the Austin American-Statesman stated that some members of the Austin community "say the division [was] a constant blemish on the campus".

== Student body ==
As of November 2020, LBJ's student body is 33.4% African American, 63.1% Hispanic, and 3.5% other racial groups. 73.9% of students are economically disadvantaged.

== Academic performance ==
In 2015 Taboada stated "LBJ has struggled academically for years."

== Campus ==
The LBJ campus opened in Northeast Austin in 1974 to relieve overcrowding at the nearby Northeast Early College High School (then known as Reagan High School.) The school went through various renovations in summer 2010, funded by AISD's 2008 bond, including remodeling many of the science labs (at the time used by LASA.) The school's theatre is located in a separate building from the rest of the campus; the building is named the Don T. Haynes III Performing Arts Center, after LBJ's band director for 39 years from 1975 to 2014. As LBJ is built upon a hill, the lowest level of the main school building is partially underground and has no windows. It is fondly referred to as "The Dungeon" throughout campus. The outside of the campus is maintained by a volunteer group of students and parents.

The most well known feature on the LBJ campus is "The Texas," a large granite statue in the shape of the state's outline. The statue, a gift from the class of 1978, sits outside the front of the school. In 2002, a group of seniors started a Northeast-LBJ tradition by wrapping the Texas in saran wrap to protect it from vandals. The night before the annual Northeast-LBJ football game, seniors wrap the Texas in saran wrap and spend the night keeping it and other parts of the campus safe from vandalism by students of their rival Northeast High School.

== Notable people ==
- Yaseen Abdalla (Class of 2019), long-distance runner
- Marshall Brown (Class of 2003), professional basketball player
- Sean Fresch (class of 2020), NFL player
- Eric Holle (Class of 1979), NFL player
- Chris Houston (Class of 2003), NFL player
- Kerry Hyder (Class of 2009), Dallas Cowboys and Texas Tech player
- John M. Jackson (social studies faculty 1975–1979), actor (Adm. Chegwidden on "JAG", and many other television and movie roles)
- Ray Jackson (Class of 1991), member of the Michigan "Fab 5" star freshman basketball players
- Chris Lowe and Scott Romig (Class of 1989), who comprise 40% of the band Dexter Freebish
- Quinlan Aquirre McAfee (Quin NFN), rapper
- Latrell McCutchin Sr. (Class of 2021), NFL football player
- Andrew Mukuba (Class of 2021), NFL football player

== See also ==
Liberal Arts and Science Academy (LASA) - LASA and LBJ students shared the same campus, newspaper, yearbook, band, theatre, orchestra, choir, and many other curricular or extracurricular programs from 2007 to 2021.
