= KLBJ =

KLBJ may refer to:

- KLBJ (AM), a radio station (590 AM) licensed to Austin, Texas, United States.
- KLBJ-FM, a radio station (93.7 FM) licensed to Austin, Texas, United States.

KLBJ could be confused with:

- K5LBJ, an amateur radio club operating in Austin, Texas, United States.
