= 2006 Texas Comptroller of Public Accounts election =

- November 7, 2006
- Turnout: 32.8%
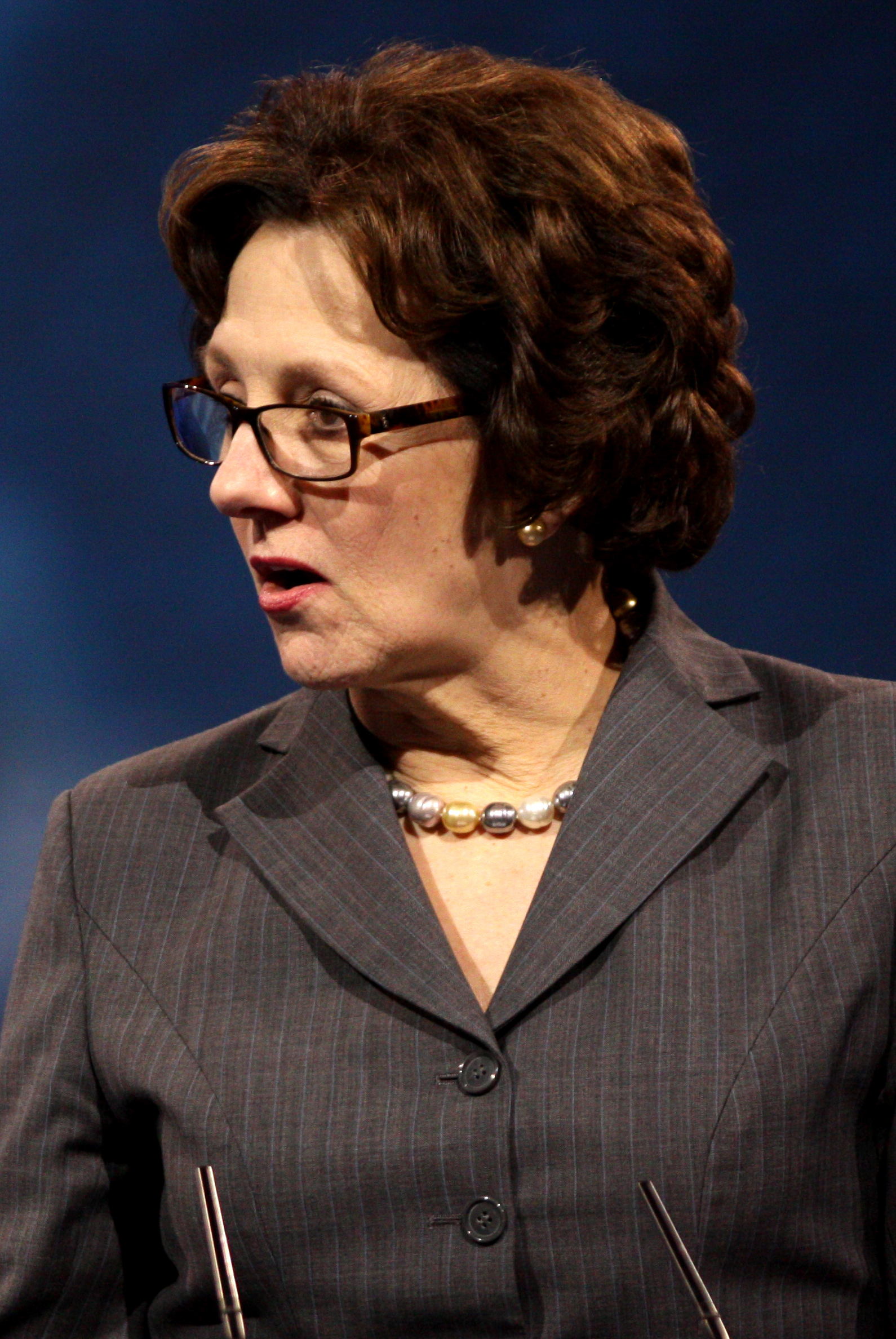

Nominee	Susan Combs	Fred Head
Party	Republican	Democratic
Popular vote	2,547,323	1,585,362
Percentage	59.47%	37.01%
- County results Combs: 40–50% 50–60% 60–70% 70–80% 80–90% Head: 40–50% 50–60% 60–70% 70–80% 80–90%
Comptroller before election
Carole Keeton Strayhorn
Republican
Elected Comptroller
Susan Combs
Republican

The 2006 Texas Comptroller of Public Accounts election took place on November 7, 2006, to elect the Comptroller of Public Accounts of Texas. Incumbent Republican comptroller Carole Keeton Strayhorn chose to retire to run for Governor of Texas as a third-party candidate. In the Republican primary, incumbent Texas Agriculture Commissioner Susan Combs won the nomination unopposed. In the Democratic primary, former state representative Fred Head won the nomination unopposed. Combs won the general election in a landslide, earning 59% of the vote to Head's 37%.

== Republican primary ==
=== Candidates ===
- Susan Combs, Texas Agriculture Commissioner

=== Results ===
Republican primary results
Party	Candidate	Votes	%
Republican	Susan Combs	792,228	100.00
Total votes		792,228	100.0

== Democratic primary ==
=== Candidates ===
- Fred Head (D), former state representative from the 15th district (1967–1973) and 14th district (1973–1981)

Democratic primary results
Party	Candidate	Votes	%
Democratic	Fred Head	412,981	100.0%
Total votes		412,981	100.0%

== General election ==
=== Candidates ===
- Susan Combs (R), Texas Agriculture Commissioner
- Fred Head (D), former state representative from the 15th district (1967–1973) and 14th district (1973–1981)
- Mike Burris (L)

=== Results ===
2006 election for Comptroller of Public Accounts
Party	Candidate	Votes	%	±%
Republican	Susan Combs	2,547,323	59.47	
Democratic	Fred Head	1,585,362	37.01	
Libertarian	Mike Burris	150,565	3.51	
Majority		961,961	22.46	
Total votes		4,283,250	100.00	
Republican hold				

== See also ==
- Texas Comptroller of Public Accounts
