= Columbia blue =

Color named after Columbia University

Columbia Blue

Color coordinates
- Hex triplet: #B9D9EB
- sRGB^{B} (r, g, b): (185, 217, 235)
- HSV (h, s, v): (202°, 21%, 92%)
- CIELCh_{uv} (L, C, h): (85, 25, 226°)
- Source: Columbia University
- ISCC–NBS descriptor: Very light greenish blue
- B: Normalized to [0–255] (byte)

Columbia blue is a light blue color named after Columbia University. The color itself derives from the official hue of the Philolexian Society, the university's oldest student organization. Although Columbia blue is often identified with Pantone 292, the Philolexian Society first used it in the early 19th century, before the standardization of colors. Pantone 290, a slightly lighter shade of blue, has also been specified by some Columbia University offices, and is the current official color listed by the Columbia University visual communications office. Several other shades are also used by parts of the university in an official capacity.

The color has been adopted by several fraternities and sororities across the United States as well as by numerous secondary schools and other colleges and universities including Johns Hopkins University. It has also been used as the official color of a number of sports teams, including the Houston Oilers, the Buffalo Braves, the Albany Attack, and the Tampa Bay Rays.

== History ==
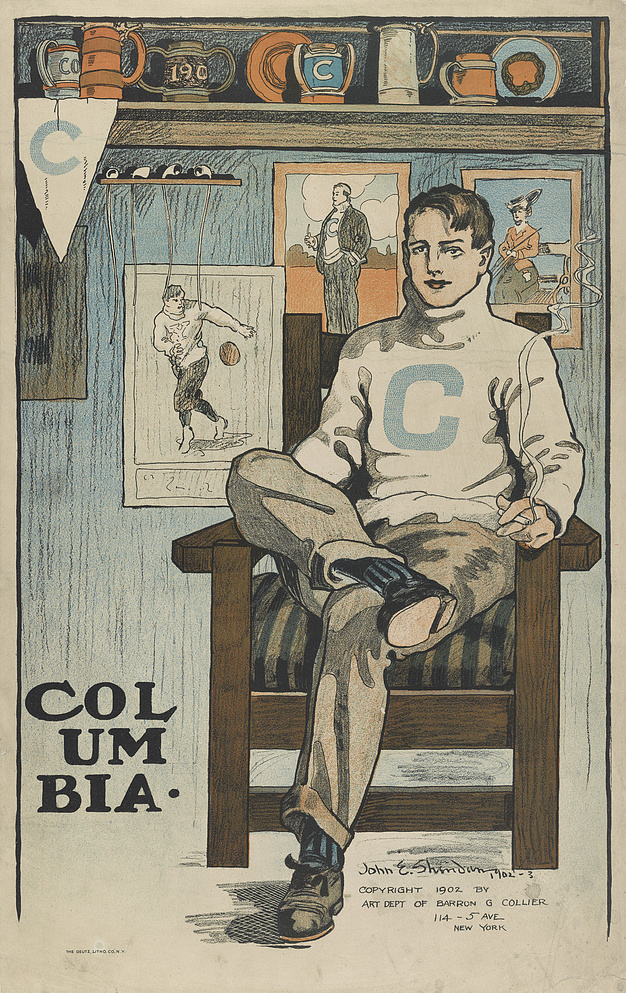
Poster depicting the archetypal Columbia University man, by John Emmet Sheridan, 1902.

Columbia blue derives from the official colors of the Philolexian Society, which was founded at Columbia in 1802. Members of the society have been reported to have worn blue satin rosettes and silver tassels as part of their academic regalia, while members of the rival Peithologian Society would wear white rosettes and gold tassels. The color was first combined with white to represent the university in 1852, during a joint event between the two societies. Both parties wishing to be represented in the promotion of the event, and having decided that using all four colors would be excessive, they picked the color scheme of blue and white, the former borrowed from the Philolexian Society, and the latter from the Peithologian. The two colors were quickly adopted by students to represent the college. According to John Howard Van Amringe, the color first entered official use during a boat race in 1873.

== Tones ==
In a 2009 publication, the university officially lists Columbia blue as Pantone 290, though a darker shade, such as Pantone 292, may still be called Columbia blue when used on a light background. "Secondary Blues" used by the university include Pantone 284, 285, 286, and 280, while the Columbia University Irving Medical Center uses Pantone 7686 and 3005. In one of the first attempts at standardization, the university's athletics department declared Columbia blue to be Pantone 292 in 1999, though, as of 2016, the Columbia Lions actually use Pantone 291; however, Pantone 292 still remains a popular byword for Columbia blue and the university as a whole.

As of 2026, Columbia's official website lists Columbia Blue as Pantone 290C.

Pantone 292 is also referenced by name in the song "Reno Dakota" on The Magnetic Fields album 69 Love Songs, which was largely written in New York.

Shades of Columbia blue
Pantone 290	Pantone 292	Pantone 284	Pantone 285
#B9D9EB	#69B3E7	#6CACE4	#0072CE

== Usage ==
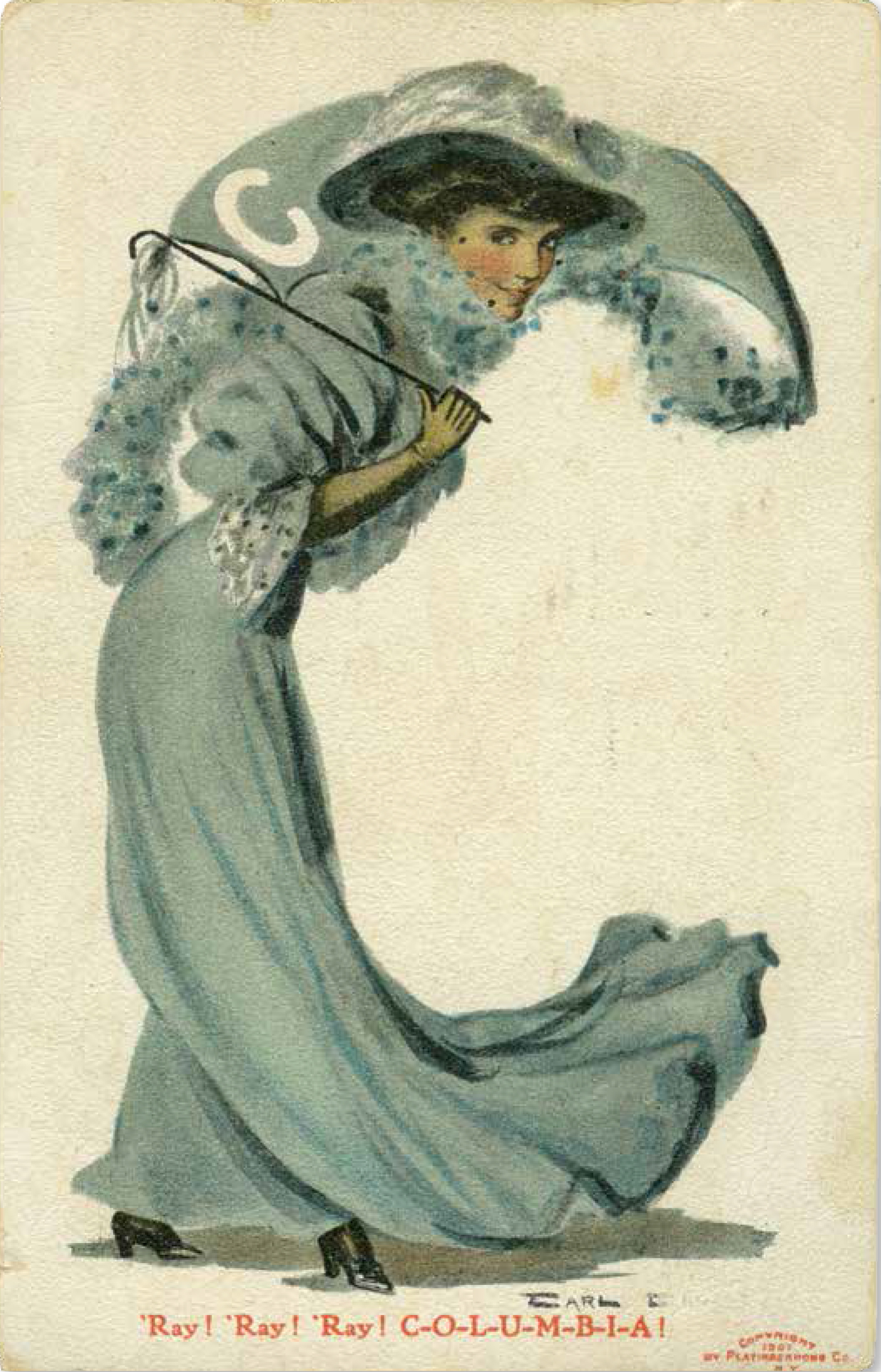
Postcard representing Columbia featuring a woman dressed in Columbia blue, by F. Earl Christy, 1907.

=== Fraternities and sororities ===
Organizations, fraternities and sororities that use Columbia blue for their colors:

- Delta Phi
- Acacia
- Lambda Kappa Sigma
- Philolexian Society
- Eta Chi Gamma of New York Institute of Technology

=== Colleges and universities ===
- Columbia Basin College
- Columbia University
- Delaware State University
- Johns Hopkins University
- Lewis–Clark State College
- Livingstone College
- Moorpark College
- Richard Stockton College
- Southern University and A&M College
- Sonoma State University
- Spelman College
- Stockton University
- University of Dayton (until 1994)
- University of San Diego
- Warner Pacific College

=== Secondary schools ===
Columbia blue is used as one of the two or three color symbols for the following colleges, universities and high schools:

- A.B. Lucas Secondary School (London, Ontario, Canada)
- Airline High School (Bossier City, Louisiana)
- Albert Einstein High School (Kensington, Maryland)
- Allen Central High School (Eastern, Kentucky)
- Antonian College Preparatory (San Antonio, Texas)
- Archbishop Molloy High School (Queens, New York)
- Arrowhead High School (Hartland, Wisconsin)
- Arroyo High School (California)
- Austin-East High School (Knoxville, Tennessee)
- Bath High School (Lima, Ohio)
- Battle Lake High School (Minnesota)
- Bartlesville High School (Oklahoma)
- Benjamin Elijah Mays High School (Georgia)
- Bishop Canevin High School (Pittsburgh, Pennsylvania)
- Bishop Mora Salesian College Preparatory (Los Angeles, California)
- Bloomington Jefferson High School (Minnesota)
- Bowsher High School (Toledo, Ohio)
- Bridgeport High School (Ohio)
- Buena High School (California)
- Cactus High School (Arizona)
- Camden County High School (Georgia)
- Captain John L. Chapin High School (Texas)
- Cascade High School (Clayton, Indiana)
- Cedar Grove High School (Georgia)
- Centennial High School (Illinois)
- Central Linn High School (Halsey, Oregon)
- Central Valley High School (Veradale, Washington)
- Centreville High School (Virginia)
- Chanute High School (Kansas)
- Chapin High School (South Carolina)
- Charlotte Catholic High School (North Carolina)
- Chief Sealth International High School (Seattle, Washington)
- China Spring High School (Texas)
- C. Leon King High School (Florida)
- Clements High School (Texas)
- Columbia Grammar & Preparatory School (New York)
- Columbia High School (New York) (East Greenbush, New York)
- Columbia Secondary School (New York)
- Comstock High School (Kalamazoo, Michigan)
- Crescenta Valley High School (La Crescenta, California)
- Corvallis High School (Oregon)
- Cumberland County High School (Crossville, Tennessee)
- Digital Harbor High School (Maryland)
- Dougherty Valley High School (California)
- Dracut High School (Massachusetts)
- Dubuque Senior High School (Iowa)
- East Buchanan High School (Iowa)
- Eleanor Roosevelt High School (Greenbelt, Maryland)
- English High School (Boston, Massachusetts)
- Enrico Fermi High School (Connecticut)
- Fashion Institute of Technology (New York)
- Father Judge High School (Pennsylvania)
- First Colonial High School (Virginia)
- Finneytown High School (Cincinnati, Ohio)
- Forest Hills Northern High School (Grand Rapids, Michigan)
- Franklin Roosevelt High School (Dallas, Texas)
- Garber High School (Essexville, Michigan)
- George C. Marshall High School (Falls Church, Virginia)
- Gibbs High School (Corryton, Tennessee)
- Glendale High School (Missouri)
- Goddard High School (New Mexico)
- Governor John R. Rogers High School (Washington)
- Grand Rapids Christian High School (Michigan)
- Greater Johnstown High School (Pennsylvania)
- Greeley West High School (Colorado)
- Guilford High School (Illinois)
- Har-Ber High School (Springdale, Arkansas)
- Heritage High School (Tennessee)
- Heritage High School (California)
- Hillcrest High School (Country Club Hills)
- Hillsdale High School (California)
- Hirschi High School (Wichita Falls, Texas)
- Holy Name Central Catholic High School (Worcester, Massachusetts)
- Illinois Mathematics and Science Academy
- Interlake High School (Bellevue, Washington)
- Jean Ribault High School (Jacksonville, Florida)
- Thomas Jefferson High School (Iowa)
- Jersey Community High School (Illinois)
- John H. Reagan High School (Austin, Texas)
- Johns Jay Senior High School
- Albert Sidney Johnston High School (Austin, Texas)
- Kankakee High School (Kankakee, Illinois)
- Kings High School (Kings Mills, Ohio)
- L.D. Bell High School (Hurst, Texas)
- Lady Bird Johnson High School (San Antonio, Texas)
- Lake High School (Millbury, Ohio)
- Lakeland Junior Senior Highschool (LaGrange, Indiana)
- Lakeridge High School (Lake Oswego, Oregon)
- Liberty High School (Hillsboro, Oregon)
- Lima Central Catholic High School (Lima, Ohio)
- Lower Cape May Regional High School (Cape May, New Jersey)
- Loyola College Prapatory High School (Shreveport, Louisiana)
- Maconaquah High School (Indiana)
- Madison High School (Portland, Oregon)
- Mahwah High School (Mahwah, New Jersey)
- Maine West High School (Des Plaines, Illinois
- Martha Layne Collins High School (Shelbyville, Kentucky)
- The Mary Louis Academy (New York)
- McMinn Central High School (Englewood, Tennessee)
- Meadowdale High School (Washington)
- Mira Loma High School (Sacramento, California)
- Montclair High School (California)
- Montpelier High School (Ohio)
- Monterey High School (Lubbock, Texas)
- Moore County High School (Lynchburg, Tennessee)
- Mount Rainier High School (Washington)
- Mountainside High School (Oregon)
- Nicolet High School (Wisconsin)
- North Fayette Valley High School (West Union, Iowa)
- North Forsyth High School (North Carolina)
- North Iredell High School (Olin, North Carolina)
- North Penn High School (Lansdale, Pennsylvania)
- North Pike High School (Mississippi)
- North Stafford High School (Virginia) (phased out after 2000)
- Oak Glen High School (West Virginia)
- Oakmont High School (Roseville, California)
- Olympia High School (Illinois)
- Page County High School (Virginia)
- Pace Academy (Georgia)
- Palisades Charter High School (California)
- Patrick Henry High School(Virginia)
- Paul M. Dorman High School (South Carolina)
- Penn Cambria High School (Pennsylvania)
- Pinckneyville Community High School (Illinois)
- Pleasant Valley High School (California)
- Pleasant Valley High School (Jacksonville, Alabama)
- Prospect High School (Illinois)
- Pueblo West High School (Colorado)
- Pueblo High School (Arizona)
- Putnam City West High School (Oklahoma)
- R B Stall High School (South Carolina)
- Ralston High School (Ralston, Nebraska)
- Ramona High School (Riverside, California)
- Ridgedale High School (Morral, Ohio)
- Roncalli High School (Wisconsin)
- Rye Neck High School (New York)
- Sam Rayburn High School (Pasadena, Texas)
- Sandwich High School (Massachusetts)
- St. Joseph's High School (South Bend, Indiana)
- St. Gregory College Preparatory School (Tucson, Arizona)
- St. Mary Catholic High School (Neenah, Wisconsin)
- Saugus High School (Santa Clarita, California)
- School of Education and Social Services (Texas)
- Seekonk High School (Massachusetts)
- Shawnee Mission East High School (Kansas)
- Simley High School (Inver Grove Heights, Minnesota)
- Skyline High School (Ann Arbor, Michigan)
- Skyline High School (Pratt, Kansas)
- Sky View High School (Smithfield, Utah)
- Willoughby South High School (Ohio)
- South Mountain High School (Phoenix, Arizona)
- South Salem High School (Oregon)
- Southside High School (Fort Smith, Arkansas)
- Springbrook High School (Maryland)
- Sunnyvale High School of Sunnyvale, California
- Thomas More High School (Milwaukee, Wisconsin)
- Thornridge High School (Dolton, Illinois)
- Toms River High School East (Toms River, New Jersey)
- Twin Falls High School (Idaho)
- Saint Elmo High School (Illinois)
- Union Grove Independent School District of Gladewater, Texas
- University Academy (Missouri)
- University City High School
- University High School (California)
- Veritas Academy (Savannah, Georgia)
- Villa Angela-St. Joseph High School (Ohio)
- Villa Park High School (California)
- Walt Whitman High School (Maryland)
- Webb City High School (Missouri)
- Waukesha North High School (Wisconsin)
- West Morris Central High School (New Jersey)
- West Orange High School (New Jersey)
- Wichita High School East (Kansas)
- Willowbrook High School (Illinois)
- Yorktown High School (Virginia)
- York High School (Maine)

=== Sports ===
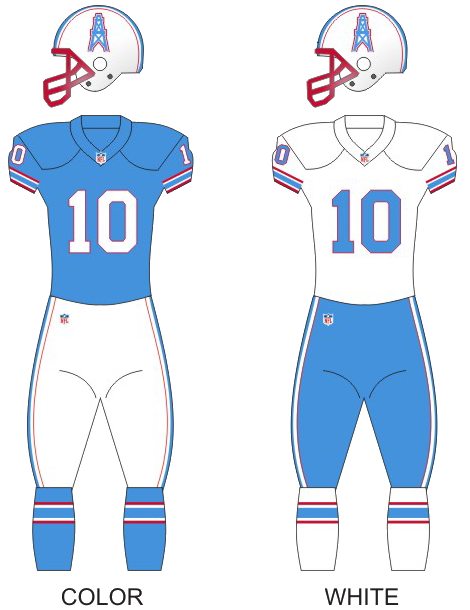
The uniforms for the Houston Oilers, in use from 1987 to 1996

- The Buffalo Braves (now the Los Angeles Clippers)
- The Denver Nuggets wore Columbia blue road jerseys from the 2003–04 NBA season to the 2016-17 NBA season
- The Kansas Jayhawks football team used Columbia blue in the early 1960s and wore Columbia blue in an October 2011 homecoming football game against the Texas Tech Red Raiders to honor their 1961 Bluebonnet Bowl champions
- The Kansas City Royals "powder blue" uniforms that debuted in 2008 are actually Columbia blue
- The Louisiana Tech Lady Techsters basketball team wears their traditional Columbia blue jerseys instead of the university's official color Reflex blue
- The Memphis Grizzlies introduced an alternate Columbia blue road jersey in 2009, which is actually "smoke blue"
- The Tampa Bay Rays selected Columbia blue as one of its three color symbols in September 2007. The color is used in the team's logos, uniforms and official merchandise
- The Houston Oilers used Columbia blue in their color scheme throughout their entire franchise history from 1960 to 1996. The Oilers moved to Tennessee in 1997 to become the Tennessee Oilers, and in 1999 would change their names and uniforms to become the present-day Tennessee Titans, including a switch to the slightly darker "Titans Blue"
- The Tennessee Lady Volunteers basketball team wears Columbia blue accents on their uniforms
- The Utah Jazz wore Columbia blue alternate road jerseys from 2006 to 2010
- The Houston Texans have had an alternate uniform that includes Columbia blue accents since 2024

== See also ==
- List of colors
