= Frank Wilson (American football, born 1958) =

American football player (born 1958)

No. 37
- Positions: Fullback, tight end

Personal information
- Born: October 11, 1958 (age 68); Austin, Texas, U.S.
- Listed height: 6 ft 2 in (1.88 m)
- Listed weight: 233 lb (106 kg)

Career information
- High school: Eastside Memorial (Austin)
- College: Rice
- NFL draft: 1981: 8th round, 209th overall pick

Career history
- Pittsburgh Steelers (1981–1982); Los Angeles Raiders (1984)*; BC Lions (1984)*; Portland Breakers (1985)
- * Offseason or practice squad member only
- Stats at Pro Football Reference

Frank Henry Wilson (born October 11, 1958) is an American former professional football player who played for the Pittsburgh Steelers of the National Football League (NFL). He played college football for the Rice Owls and was selected by the Steelers in the eighth round of the 1981 NFL draft.

== Early life ==
Frank Henry Wilson was born on October 11, 1958, in Austin, Texas. He attended Eastside Memorial High School in Austin.

== College career ==
Wilson enrolled at Rice University to play college football for the Owls. He was a four-year letterman from 1977 to 1980. He was a linebacker his first two seasons and also saw some time at tight end, catching one pass for 12 yards in 1977. He then played running back from 1979 to 1980, finishing his college career with totals of 156 carries for 558 yards, 13 receptions for 104 yards and one touchdown, and 12 kick returns for 188 yards.

== Professional career ==
Wilson was selected by the Pittsburgh Steelers in the eighth round, with the 209th overall pick, of the 1981 NFL draft. He missed the entire 1981 season due to injury. He was released before the start of the 1982 regular season but re-signed on September 9, 1982. Wilson then played in one game for the Steelers before being placed on season-ending injured reserve on September 17. He was placed on injured reserve again on August 16, 1983, and was released on September 5, 1983.

Wilson signed with the Los Angeles Raiders on May 20, 1984, to play defensive end. He was released on August 27, 1984, before the start of the regular season.

On October 11, 1984, it was reported that Wilson had signed a 21-day-trial with the BC Lions of the Canadian Football League as a defensive lineman. However, he left the team before ever playing for them, stating "It just wasn’t the same game. Three downs, the field, all the passing. It was a totally different game. I just wasn’t used to it. So I told them I appreciated them bringing me in but it wasn’t going to work out."

Wilson then started working as a schoolteacher. The Portland Breakers of the United States Football League (USFL) wanted to sign him to a contract but he told them to call him again after the school year had ended. He later played in the final four games of the 1985 USFL season for the Breakers and recorded one interception for 68 yards. The USFL folded after the 1985 season.
