= Albert Sidney Johnston High School =

High school in Texas, United States

Coordinates: 30°15′29″N 97°40′53″W

- Austin, Texas; United States

Information
- School type: Public high school
- Opened: 1960
- Closed: 2008
- School district: Austin Independent School District
- Grades: 9–12
- Campus: Urban
- Colors: Scarlet and Columbia blue
- Mascot: Ram
- Nickname: Rams

Albert Sidney Johnston High School served as a comprehensive, coeducational high school in the Austin Independent School District from 1960 to 2008. Located in Austin, Texas, the school was named after General Albert Sidney Johnston, who served as Secretary of War for the Republic of Texas and as a brigadier general for the Texian Army of the Republic of Texas, the United States Army, and the Confederate States Army.

From its inception in 1960, Johnston High School was well known for a wide variety of vocational and technical programs that prepared students for work in such fields as cosmetology, printing, auto mechanics, industry and business. Primarily a school for the Hispanic and African-American students of East Austin, Johnston High School grew to be a 5A school and weathered the challenges of desegregation, forced busing, and the end of desegregation.

From 1988 to 2002, Johnston High School housed the signature Liberal Arts Academy, a college-preparatory liberal arts magnet program that brought students to Johnston High School from throughout the Austin independent school District. Beginning in 2004, Johnston High School hosted International High School, a "school within a school" that provided an intensive English program for ninth- and tenth-grade immigrant and refugee students who were bused to Johnston High School from throughout Austin.

In 2008, Johnston High School was the first school in Texas to be closed and reconstituted under the accountability system of Texas Education Agency Commissioner Robert Scott.

== School information ==
=== School name ===
In 1958, the Austin School Board approved the construction of a new high school in East Austin, some 3,000 feet from a bend in the Colorado River. Construction on the facility—originally named Riverside High School—began in 1959.

The program for the school's 25th jubilee in 1985 suggests that the school was named Riverside High School "partly because it was on the [Colorado] river, but also because there was a well-known high school in Fort Worth at the time named Riverside High School." The school's 1985 yearbook similarly shares, "While under construction, Johnston was called Riverside High School because it was near the Colorado River. Things soon changed. 'River rats' wasn't an appropriate nickname [for a mascot]." The 1985 jubilee program confirms that even before the school was opened, "the nickname 'Riverside Rats' was already being applied. So several students at Allan Junior High, who would be coming to the new high school, petitioned the school board to change the name. Besides, hidden in the school board regulations was a ruling that stated that all schools in Austin must be named for a person and that person must be dead."

Students of Allan Junior High submitted a list of possible names for a renamed school. The list of possible names that came before the Austin School Board included such heroes as David Crockett, John H. Reagan, Sidney Lanier, and Albert Sidney Johnston, an American Civil War hero buried in Austin.

Board minutes reflect that the school board ceded to the request of future students to change the name of the school to honor "some historical or educational figure such as the other high schools of the city." Three names were ultimately considered by the Board: Davy Crockett High School, Coronado High School, and Albert Sidney Johnston High School.

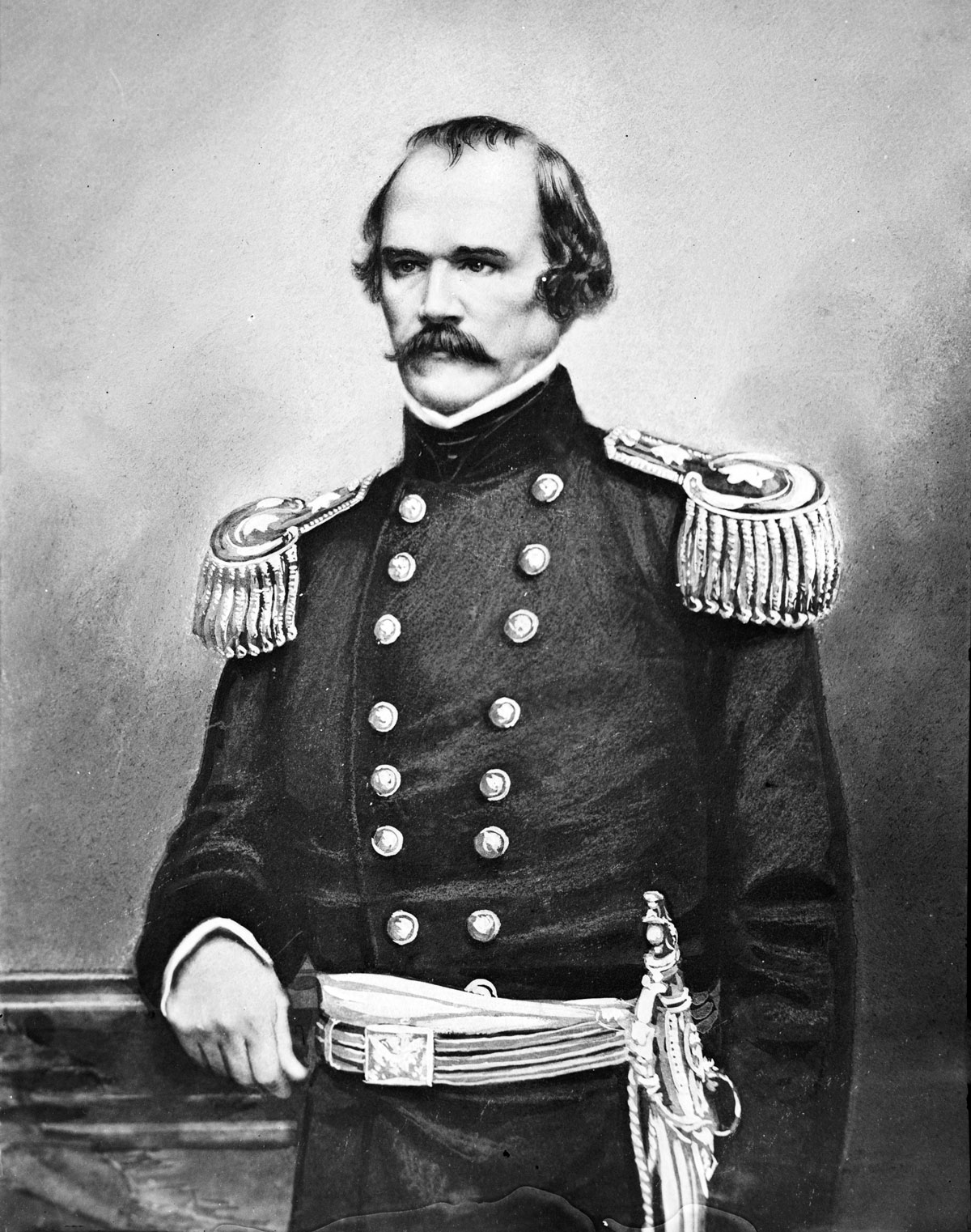
Confederate General Albert Sidney Johnston

With heightened activities focused on the centennial celebration of the American Civil War (1860–1865), the school was renamed after Albert Sidney Johnston, an American Civil War general buried at the Texas State Cemetery, 3.5 miles west of the school. The next two high schools built by the Austin Public Schools during the centennial celebration would also be named for Confederate heroes: Sidney Lanier High School (which opened in 1961) and John H. Reagan High School (which opened in 1965), prompting some to speculate that the naming of these three schools for Confederate heroes was a "push to glorify the Confederacy as a deliberate slap in the face to minorities and the federal government after the 1954 Supreme Court school desegregation decision Brown v. Board of Education."

It seems that Albert Sidney Johnston, a native-Kentuckian, was relatively unknown at that time. In an Austin Statesman article entitled, "Yes, Ma'm, He's Texan," Anita Brewer wrote, "Some Austinites are perplexed about this man, Johnston. Just who was this fellow? Why was he important enough for the Austin Board of Education and the future students of Austin's new eastside high school to scuttle a perfectly good name like 'Riverside' to name the school for Johnston? The School Board voted unanimously Monday night to rename the new school the Albert Sidney Johnston High School…. Historians are cheering the board's decision as a fine one and a belated and overdue tribute to one of the greatest of the early Texans." A photo of Johnston's tomb at the Texas State Cemetery was featured in the newspaper, with the caption, "Johnston interest is revived as School Board names new high school for famed Confederate."

With Founding Principal Gordon Bailey's death thirty years later, on January 27, 1990, alumni rallied to rename Johnston High School for their longtime principal of happy memory. In May 1990, a petition was brought by alumni to the board of trustees of the Austin independent school District, to rename the school for Bailey. The school's newspaper reported: "'Papa Bailey,' as he was affectionately called, often met his students at the door each day. His devotion to the school was deep, working weekends and coming in to help do school repairs himself. It is this kind of spirit that moved his alumni to attempt to honor him with a renaming of the school [to which] he gave so much. But many students now attending Johnston reacted with disbelief and protest. 'When you take the name, you also take our identity,' Joy A. Foster said." The Board did not rename the school for Bailey in 1990, but broke ground in 1992 for a middle school in Austin named in Bailey's memory.

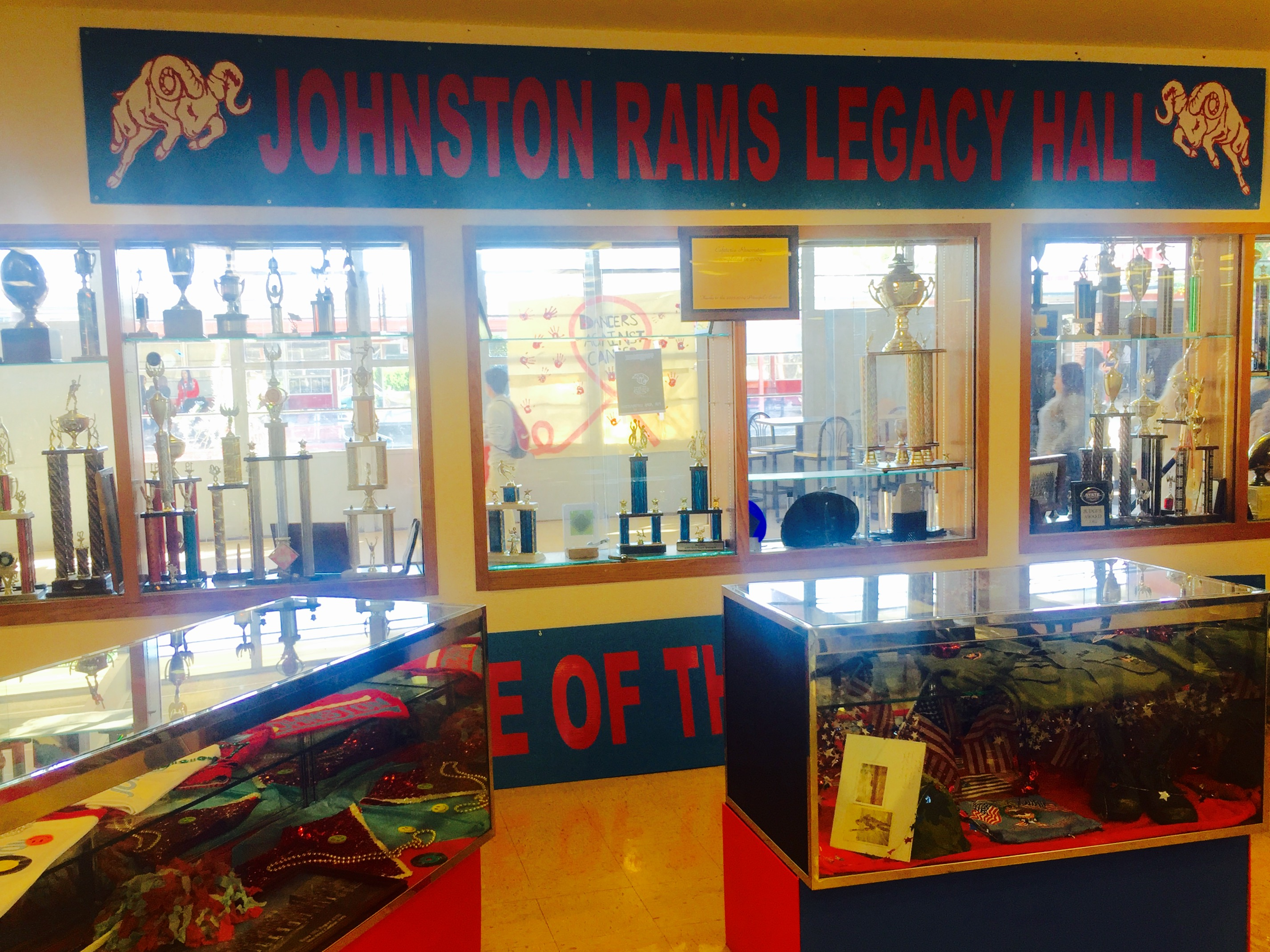
The Johnston Rams Legacy Hall at the Liberal Arts and Science Academy, which occupies the former Johnston campus.

In 2008, Johnston High School was the first high school in Texas to be closed under a new state accountability system. In August 2008, a new high school, Eastside Memorial High School, was opened in the same facility. In 2009, the school was divided into two campuses: Eastside Green Tech and Eastside Global Tech. On May 23, 2011, partly to honor the legacy of Johnston High School, the school was renamed Eastside Memorial High School at the Johnston Campus.

Memorabilia from Johnston High School can be found at the Johnston Rams Legacy Hall, located inside the cafeteria of Eastside Memorial High School at the Johnston Campus.

=== School colors ===
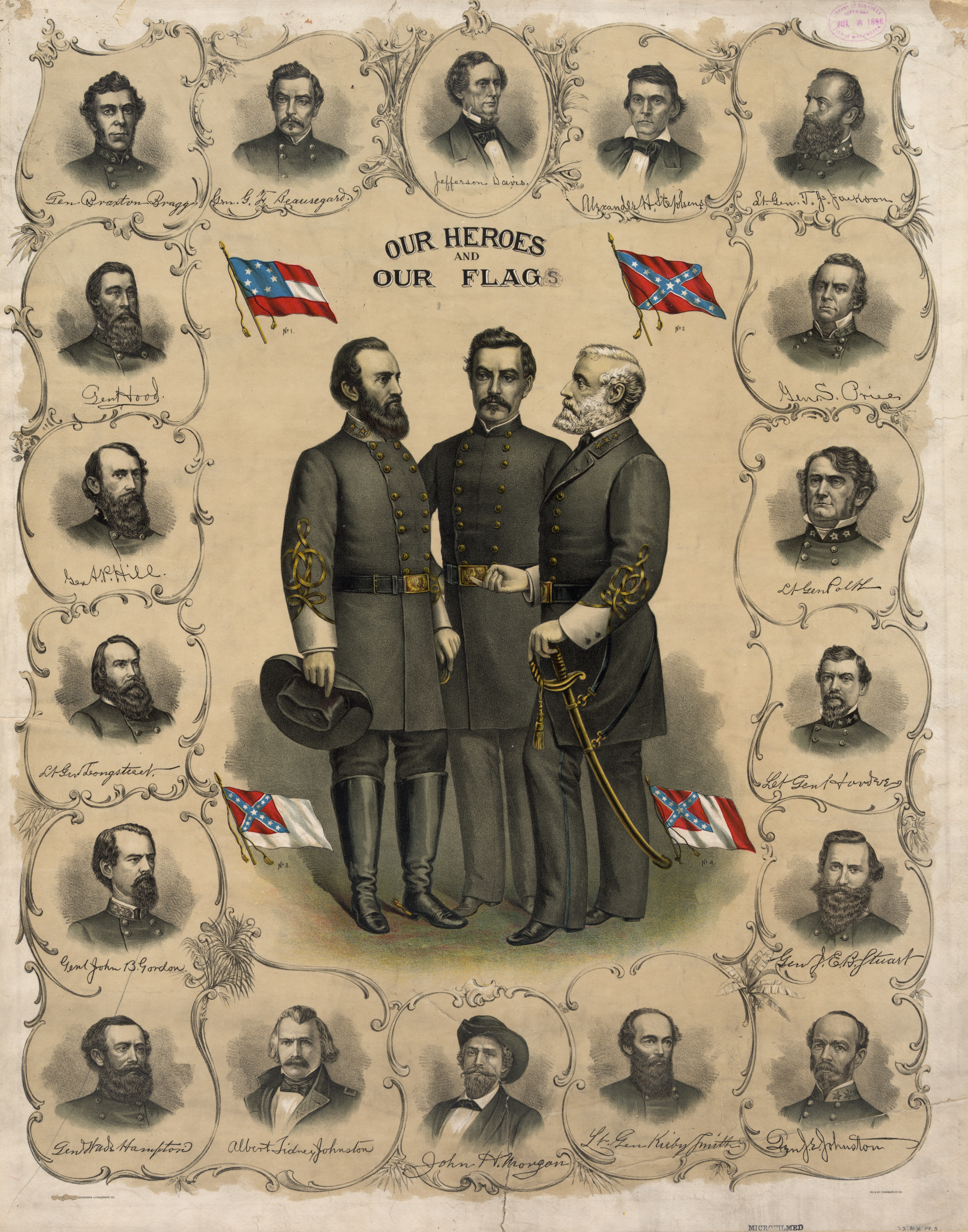
Confederate heroes & flags, with Albert Sidney Johnston pictured in the bottom row (second to the left). Note that the primary colors of the Confederate flags are scarlet and Columbia blue, the colors of A.S. Johnston High School in Austin, Texas.

The Johnston High School colors were scarlet and Columbia blue, colors often associated with the flags of the Confederate States of America. The program for the school's 25th jubilee shares that "students of the new school chose everything. It was their school" and that the choice of Columbia blue was "somewhat rare as a school color at the time." The choice of Columbia blue is interesting insofar as Confederate flags typically contain navy blue; a lighter blue, similar to Columbia blue, was contained in the Second Confederate Navy Jack (1863–1865).

School spirit often centered around "the Red & Blue", and various school programs and events incorporated the colors.

=== School songs ===
The Johnston High School song, or alma mater, was "Loyal Hearts", which was sung to the tune of Jean Sibelius' "Finlandia". The words were: "With loyal hearts, we hail our alma mater, praising her name for all the world to hear. Her colors fly up in the sky triumphantly and wave us on to glorious victory. Her Red & Blue, her spirits true do testify of (or 'to') praises sung for mighty Johnston High!" The lyrics are attributed to Jacqueline McGee, an English teacher & yearbook sponsors at Johnston High School, who would later become the school's first Dean of Girls, then Austin's first woman principal, first at Burnet Junior High and later at Stephen F. Austin High School.

The program for the school's 25th jubilee in 1985 notes that "the tradition of linking little fingers during the school song was, according to Mr. Bailey, a common tradition among high schools at the time and a symbol of unity among the students."

Johnston also had a fight song entitled "Fighting Rams". Its lyrics were: "We are the Rams of Johnston High. Invincible we stand, united in our praises of the best school in the land. Let's give a cheer, a rousing cheer. Let's fight to win the game. In victory, we'll crown our school with glory and fame. Let's fight! Let's fight! For Johnston High, let's fight! Let's fight for the Red & Blue and victory tonight! Go! Fight! Go, Rams! Go!"

=== School mascot ===
The mascot of Johnston High School was the ram.

The program for the school's 25th jubilee in 1985 shares that "students of the new school chose everything. It was their school, …and the principal, Mr. Bailey, was determined that they should have a voice in selecting everything from its mascot to its yearbook name." The school's 1985 yearbook shares that "rumors circulate that a ram was selected since a ram once roamed free around the school when it was first built and nothing but cow pastures surrounded the school. Another version accounting for the name was that since the Los Angeles Rams were a popular and powerful football team at the time Johnston was seeking a mascot, the Rams were a likely choice." The program for the school's 25th jubilee confirms, "The students selected the Ram as their mascot because the Los Angeles Rams were a powerful football team at the time."

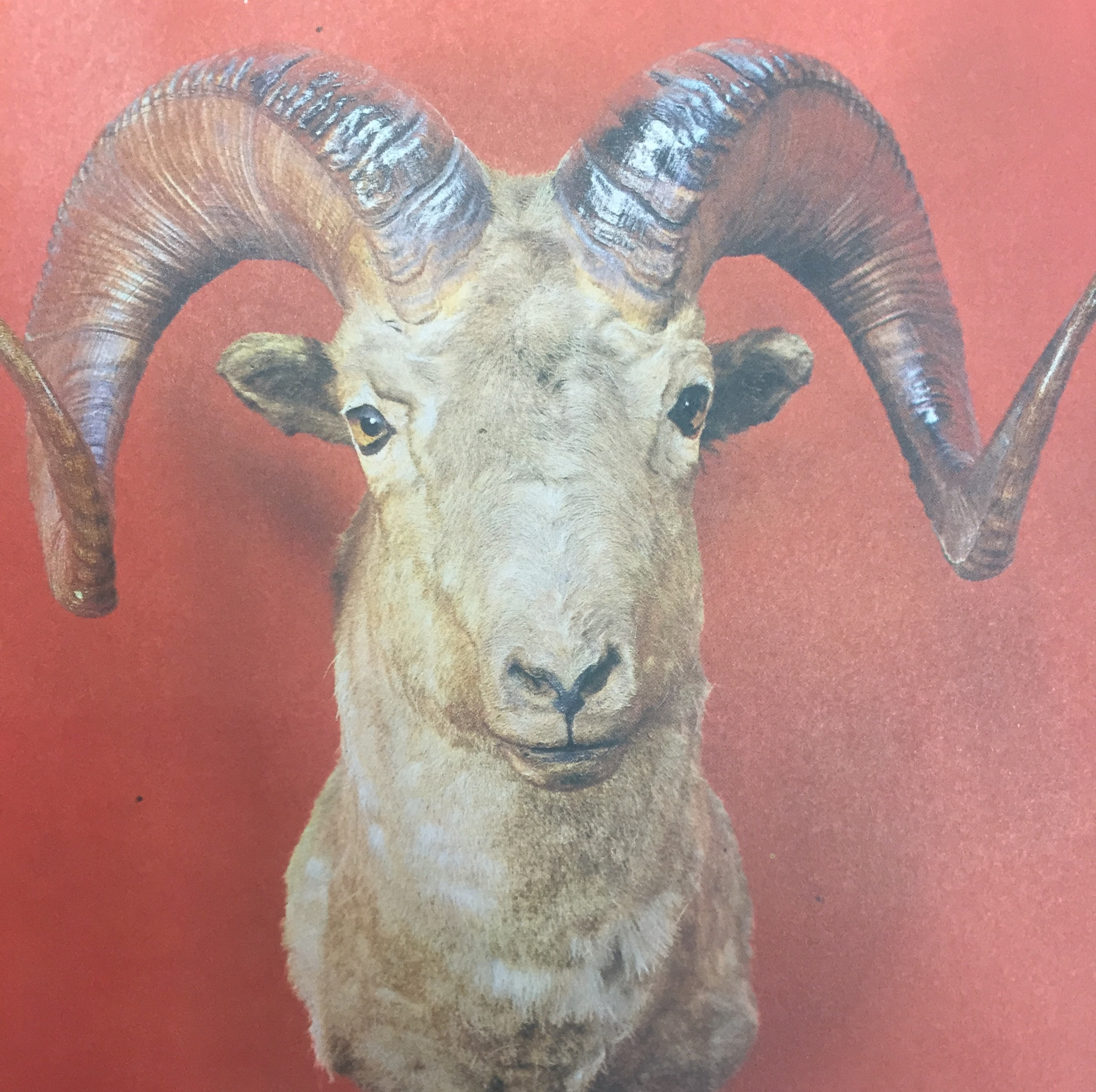
The head of King Ramses I (the former mascot of Johnston High School in Austin, Texas) which used to hang in the office of the school

School yearbooks suggest that during the school's first year, the Fall Student Council led an effort to purchase a ram, named "King Ramses I", which accompanied students to athletic competitions. During the school's second year, the Boys' Service Club was formed to take care of the mascot and to transport it to and from athletic competitions. After the death of King Ramses I in 1964, the Boys' Service Club mounted its head in the front hall of the school, and a new mascot by the same name was purchased.

The program for the school's 25th jubilee in 1985 offers a slightly different history: that "many high schools had live mascots in the 60s, and Johnston was no exception. A live ram was given to the school by a student's father; he was promptly named Ramses. He was kept at a student's house, but he went to all football games. At one game, another team was represented by a live horse with a student rider. The horse was spooked by Ramses and nearly threw his rider. The school board then ruled that no school could have a live mascot. So Johnston had to get rid of Ramses! A student group at the time, perhaps the Boys' Club, decided to slaughter him and use the cooked meat as a fundraiser. The feast was held at a local restaurant, and Ramses' head was stuffed and mounted and hung in the main hall of Johnston. The head was taken down in 1983 because of its dirtied condition and is being cleaned."

The program continues: "After the demise of Ramses, the school was adopted by a second 'mascot.' A small black-and-white dog decided he would be Johnston's mascot, guard dog, and general care-taker. His name seems to be lost in the caverns of individual memories; some people claim he was called 'Ramsey,' others 'Ramses II,' and others say he was simply 'Ram.' At any rate, he was allowed to roam the halls and eat in the cafeteria. He had enough sense not to disturb classes, and the students had enough sense not to take him to football games. Ramsey and Johnston were very happy together until—one day, the circus came to town. And when the circus left, Ramsey was gone. Whether he was dog-napped, was killed, or voluntarily left for excitement and adventure was never known. But Johnston has not had a live mascot since."

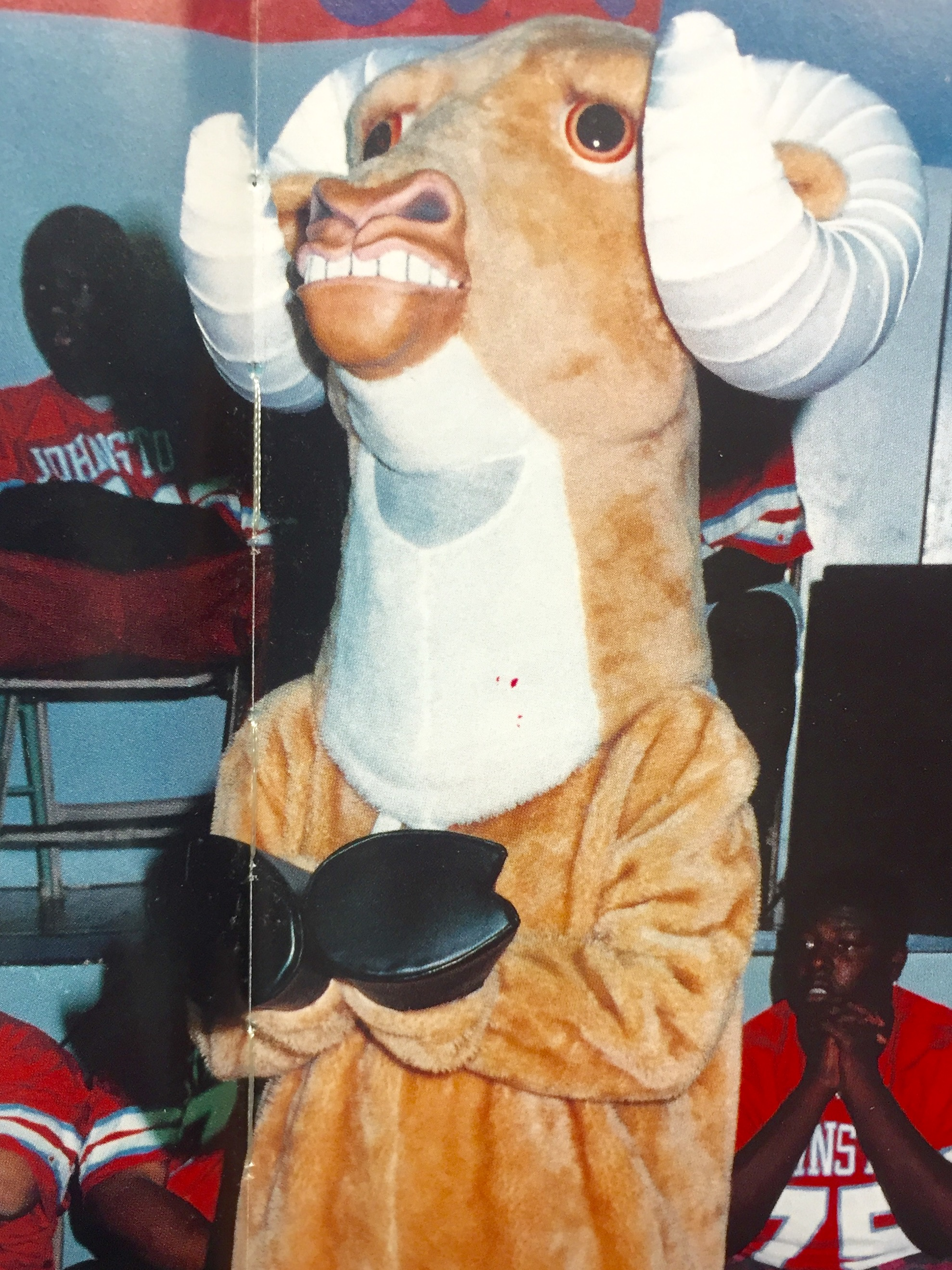
"Rambo", the later mascot of Johnston High School.

The school later purchased the costume of a ram for a new mascot, which was named "Rambo" after the protagonist John Rambo in the 1980s film series starring Sylvester Stallone. By 2001, the costume had suffered enough wear that a new Rambo costume was purchased.

Because the school mascot was the ram, the school was often referred to as "Ramland", and students and athletes alike were often referred to as Rams and Ramettes.

== History ==
=== Opening ===
In 1958, the Austin School Board approved a new high school in East Austin for students graduating from the nearby Allan Junior High School, which desegregated that same year. Construction on the facility—originally named Riverside High School—began in 1959.

In 1960, with heightened activity focused on the centennial celebration of the American Civil War (1860–1865), the school was renamed after Albert Sidney Johnston, a Civil War general buried at the Texas State Cemetery, 3.5 miles west of the school.

Albert Sidney Johnston High School opened in 1960 under the leadership of Austin Public Schools Superintendent Dr. Irby B. Carruth and Johnston High School Principal Gordon A. Bailey, who led the school for 12 years.

The school's 1985 Jubilee program notes that Johnston High School was opened in February 1960 with a single administrator, Mr. Bailey, overseeing the education of 325 sophomores and juniors. The following Fall, another administrator, Vice Principal Wallace Dockall, was added to help oversee the growing student body, which now comprised sophomores, juniors and seniors. Albert Sidney Johnston High School graduated its first senior class of 80 students in 1961. In the Fall of 1962, the ninth-grade class was moved from Allan Junior High School, making Johnston High School a full, four-year high school.

=== Desegregation and resegregation ===
The desegregation of public schools in Austin was a long and arduous process. The U.S. Department of Education had accepted the district's plan for desegregation in 1955, but the plan was still not implemented in 1966.

In 1956, 13 African-American students were integrated into Austin's "White" high schools; integration did not occur at the junior high level until 1958 when the first African-American student was integrated into the "White" Allan Junior High School, near Johnston High School.

The first integration of faculty in Austin did not occur until 1964 when world history teacher William Akins (after whom Akins High School in the Austin independent school District is named) was the first African-American teacher to be integrated at Johnston High School. Akins was one of three teachers to be integrated into "White" schools in 1964, with the other two, B.T. Snell and Narveline Drennan, being assigned to teach at the nearby Allan Junior High School.

In July 1971, after various failed attempts by the Austin ISD to desegregate its schools, a U.S. District Court judge ordered the immediate implementation of a busing plan that would transport over 13,000 Austin students to integrated schools at a cost of more than $1 million. Two pages of the 1972 Johnston High School yearbook were dedicated to largely negative reactions to busing by students. One student was reported as saying, "They ought to hang [busing] up. It's not contributing to education. It's just causing more hatred amongst the Black and White pupils because they can't get along with each other." The same yearbook reported that violent incidents erupted "as well as some well-spread rumors of upcoming violence," and that "thousands of students stayed away from school on May 1 [1972], which was being called 'Bloody Monday,' because of expected violence on local [Austin] campuses."

While forced busing was appealed through the courts, the school's 1974 yearbook reported a great deal of persistent segregation. A White world geography teacher shared, "The browns sit together, the blacks sit together, and the whites sit by me." Other teachers observed, "My students tend to segregate themselves," "there is a lot of racial prejudice but it is well contained," and "[students] get along fine because all the browns sit together and all the blacks sit together. There are a few that mix."

According to the school's 1980 yearbook, "desegregation, busing, rumor and question marks occupied students, faculty in winter of '79." In January 1980, a series of desegregation appeals were finally settled by Judge Jack Roberts, and a tri-ethnic desegregation plan of forced busing, affirmative action hiring, and bilingual education was implemented for the Austin ISD in the Fall of 1980 with $3.4 million of emergency aid from the federal government. The school's yearbook reported, "The almost decade-long desegregation case of AISD was finally coming to an end; Johnston High was in the midst of the issue. When school began, students, parents, and faculty knew of the changes coming to Johnston High School. What kind of changes? That was still not decided when school began. Yet, we decided not to wait for the final outcome of the court battles, appeals and counter-appeals."

After the court-ordered busing was effected, students were bused to Johnston from northwest, southwest and south Austin. The demographics of Johnston High School quickly and dramatically changed, as evidenced by the White faces of the school's homecoming court and the "Who's Who" section of its subsequent yearbooks. In 1985, the school's homecoming court was entirely White, and only one of 24 students in the "Who's Who" section of the yearbook had a Hispanic surname. The White editor of the 1984 yearbook shared an idyllic view of racial integration: "Busing would take kids from the different parts of town and all the different walks of life, and gather them all together in one school. Both parents and students alike objected to the busing. Many people went to private schools, or moved into a different school district. Those that went along with busing did suffer some, but the majority of the students had no regrets later. The Johnston Senior Class was one made up of all sorts of people and, through the years, they became very close. No integration was fully satisfied, but the Senior Class has made the first step in creating a unified bond between the different sections of the city."

For many, Johnston High School was a model for desegregation. An April 25, 1983, article in Time magazine noted how the school used to be, in the words of Principal Adan Salgado, "the doormat of the district", but that "the administration [subsequently] began beefing up the academic program, installing the school system's first computer center and adding advanced courses in French, Latin, math, biology and chemistry…. In 1980, 90% of the students were below grade level in math; by 1982, the figure had improved to 54%."

Johnston High School again made the news when President Ronald Reagan cited the Time magazine article during a press conference on May 17, 1983, noting how local officials were taking the initiative to transform schools without federal aid and the court-ordered desegregation that Reagan often opposed. The New York Times offered a corrective, noting that court-ordered busing and $368,000 in federal aid "transformed the Johnston High School from a decaying slum school into an institution that has gained national attention for educational excellence." The paper quoted Principal Adan Salgado, who shared that President Reagan "did not really understand our situation. He did not have all the facts." Salgado noted that the President's decision to eliminate federal funding under the Emergency School Assistance Act negatively impacted the Johnston community, which, before desegregation through busing, was "99 percent Mexican-American and black, …the 'doormat of the district.'" The article continued: "Before that, Mr. Salgado said, his school was deteriorating badly, suffering from poor attendance, low achievement and lack of parental involvement. He said the Federal aid allowed him to keep promises to parents about school improvements. New classrooms were built, the gymnasium and locker rooms were remodeled, courses in Latin and computer sciences were added, and new band uniforms were purchased."

The school's 1985 jubilee program shared that 55% of Johnston students at that time were bused to the school from other parts of Austin and that the school was then 50% Anglo, 30% Mexican-American and 20% African-American, "thus reflecting the general population of Austin."

Within seven years, desegregation ended. By 1983, the Fifth U.S. Circuit Court of Appeals had determined that the Austin ISD had removed all remaining vestiges of segregation and was now free from federal interventions, like the busing mandate, paving the way for the district's decision to end forced busing in 1987. The school's 1987 yearbook reported, "Topping the local news in 1986–87 was the Austin independent school Board's decision to stop desegregation. As a result of this decision, most students will be attending neighborhood schools, regardless of racial distribution. The new districting plan will make Johnston a vocational magnet school."

By 2006, the Daily Texan would report that Austin ISD schools "had begun to slip into patterns of racial isolation mirroring the east-west residential divide" and that "Austin ISD is part of a nationwide trend of school re-segregation caused by the dismantling of court-ordered desegregation plans". The article pointed out that with the end of busing, the percentage of students who passed state standardized tests fell from 60% to 20%.

== Leadership ==
=== Principals of Johnston High School ===
- Gordon A. Bailey (1960–1972)
- Leroy Fenstemaker (1973–1974)
- Adan C. Salgado (1975–1986)
- Irma Novoa (1987–1991)
- Hector Montenegro (1992–1995)
- Phil Rambikur (interim 1996)
- James Wilson (1999)
- Alejandro Mindiz-Melton (1999–2000) resigned
- Dorothy Orebo (interim 2000)
- James Richardson (2000) resigned
- Darrel Baker (interim 2000)
- Cathy Cunningham (interim 2001)
- Sal Cavazos (2001–2002) resigned
- Donna Calzada (interim 2002–2003)
- Tabita Gutierrez (2004–2005)
- Celina Estrada-Thomas (2005–2008)

=== Magnet School and Academy Directors ===
• Director of the Liberal Arts Academy at Johnston High School, Paula Tyler (1987–2002)

- Director of the Academy of Arts and Humanities, Jacquelyn Robertson (2005–2008)
- Director of the Academy of Scientific Inquiry and Design, Jonathan Harris (2005–2008)
- Director of Academy of Technology, Scott Lipton (2005–2007)
