= Austin shooting =

Austin shooting may refer to:

- 1966 University of Texas tower shooting
- 2021 Austin shooting
- 2023 Central Texas shootings, some of which took place in Austin
- 2026 Austin bar shooting
