= 2023 Central Texas shootings =

Spree shooting in Texas, U.S.

2023 Central Texas spree killings
- Location: Austin and Bexar County, Texas, United States
- Date: December 4–5, 2023; 10:40 am – 6:54 pm (CST)
- Attack type: Spree shooting; mass shooting; parricide; mass murder
- Weapon: .45-caliber Inland Manufacturing 1911A1 handgun
- Deaths: 6
- Injuries: 3
- Perpetrator: Shane Matthew James Jr.
- Motive: Under investigation

On December 5, 2023, a shooting spree in Texas that spanned from Bexar County to Austin left six people dead and three others injured. The perpetrator, Shane Matthew James Jr., is the son of two of the victims of the shooting.

== Shootings ==
=== Austin ===
At around 10:40 am. CST, a resource officer was shot and injured near Northeast Early College High School. The sergeant, who is responsible for several campuses, was shot in the leg during his daily check on the high school. During the shooting, the officer reported that he was taking gunfire, and another resource officer arrived to provide backup to the injured sergeant. The shooting caused the campus to go into lockdown, and the Austin Police Department responded at around 10:47. After, the school did a controlled release of its students.

At 11:59 am, a double homicide was reported near Shadywood Lane, where a man and a woman were killed. Police said that the victims had "obvious signs of trauma to their bodies". One of the victims was found dead at the scene, while the other died from their injuries at a local hospital. Fox 7 Austin reported that the suspect saw 32-year-old Emmanuel Pop Ba sitting in his car, and then shot him through the passenger window. 24-year-old Sabrina Rahman then came out to see what happened, and the suspect chased and then shot her.

At 4:57 pm, a cyclist riding on West Slaughter Lane was shot and injured. The man was said to have suffered non-life-threatening injuries.

At 6:54 pm, officers responded to a burglary on Austral Loop. An officer who responded found the suspect in the house's backyard, and they both exchanged fire. During the shootout, the suspect shot and injured the officer. The officer shot back but wasn't able to hit the suspect. The suspect then fled the scene. The officer was said to have suffered non-fatal injuries. Police found the bodies of two women, 30-year old Lauren Short and 56-year old Katherine Short, inside the home that had been burglarized, both of which suffered from shot and killed.

After fleeing the shooting on Austral Loop, the suspect got into a police chase. He drove a stolen Acura, and reached speeds of up to 90 mph. The chase ended at around 7:14 p.m. when the suspect crashed his vehicle near FM 1826 and MoPac. Police found a 1911 A1 .45-caliber pistol and handgun magazines on him.

=== Bexar County ===
Bexar County Sheriff Javier Salazar said that police discovered two bodies in a home in the San Antonio area. The bodies were "wedged inside a very small room". After learning about the suspect in the Austin shootings, Salazar said that he had "links" to the home. Phyllis James and Shane James, the suspect's parents, are believed to be the victims.

=== Victims ===
- Shane M. James Sr.
- Phyllis James
- Emmanuel Pop Ba, 32
- Sabrina Rahman, 24
- Katherine Short, 56
- Lauren Short, 30

== Perpetrator ==
The suspect, Shane Matthew James Jr. of San Antonio, was 34 years old at the time of the shootings. James reportedly had a history of violence and suffered from mental health issues. He is a veteran of the U.S. Army. In January 2022, James was arrested in relation to a domestic violence incident and subsequently released on bail. In August 2023, police were called due to reports that James was suffering from a mental health episode but they "left the residence without taking him into custody on the misdemeanor warrants to avoid a possible violent confrontation."

Following his arrest in relation to the December 2023 shootings, James was charged with four counts of capital murder and held without bond.

In October 2024, a Travis County, Texas judge ruled that James was not competent to stand trial and ordered the prosecution to be paused. In July 2025, James was found to be competent to stand trial, and his case was returned to the 147th Criminal District Court for further action.

On November 9, 2026, James was found guilty in the Austin murders and was sentenced to life in prison without the possibility of parole.

== Reactions ==
President Biden called on Republicans to ban assault weapons and urged them to help take action on gun control after the shootings in Central Texas and the University of Nevada, Las Vegas. Biden also said that he and Jill Biden joined citizens across the nation in praying for the fallen.

Texas Governor Greg Abbott, on a post on X, described the shootings as heinous, and said that James, the perpetrator, must "never see the light of day". Abbott also said that he and his wife Cecilia were praying for the recovery of the injured, and thanked law enforcement for risking their lives to apprehend James.
