= Juan Navarro High School =

Navarro Early College High School

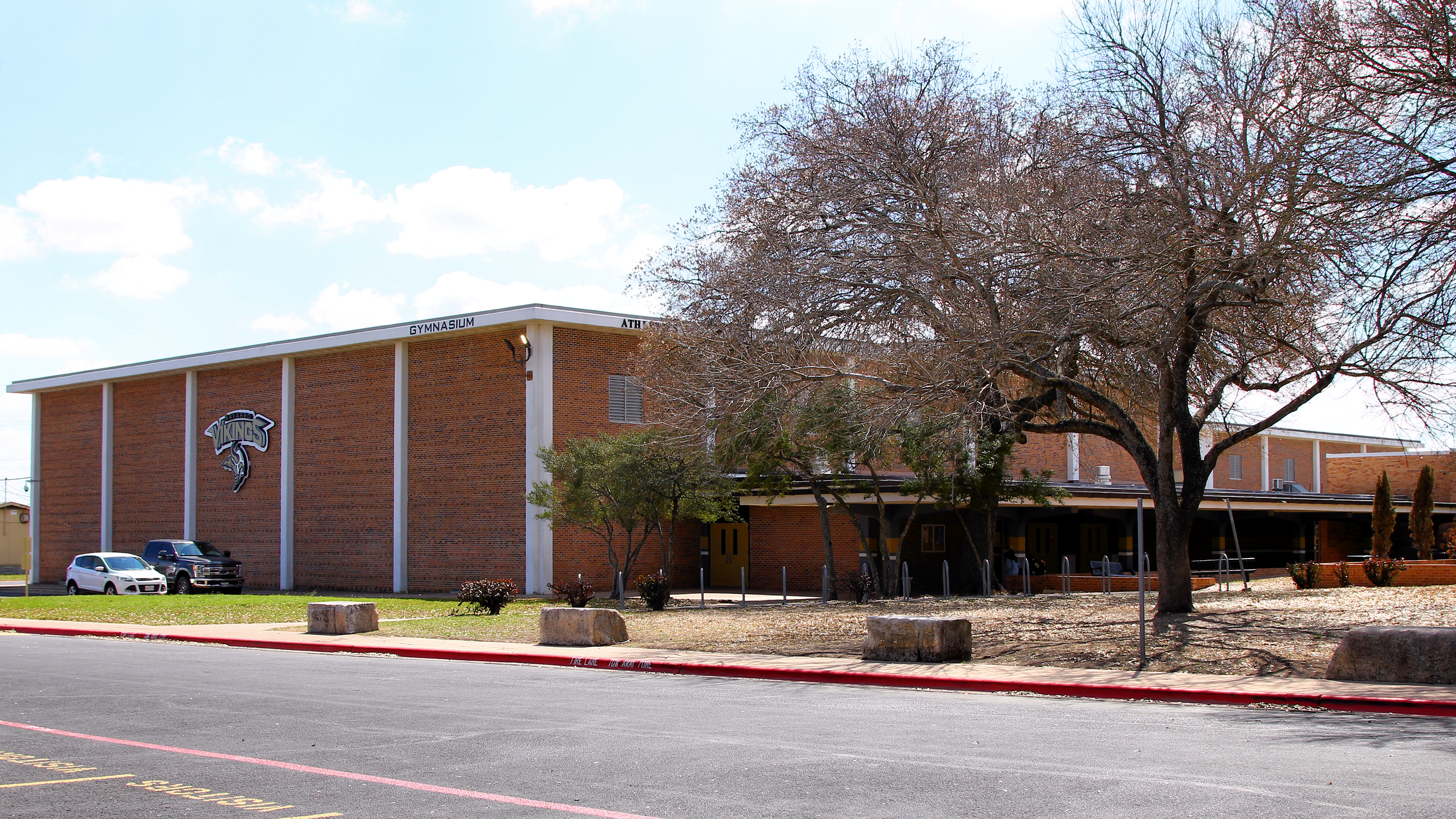

Location
- 1201 Payton Gin Road; Austin, Texas; 78758; United States; 30°21′37″N 97°42′28″W

Information
- Motto: "What Starts Here Changes Education"
- Established: 1961
- School district: Austin Independent School District
- Principal: Steven Covin
- Teaching staff: 109.13 (FTE)
- Grades: 9-12
- Enrollment: 1,466 (2025-2026)
- Student to teacher ratio: 15.71
- Colors: Black, White and Old Gold
- Athletics conference: UIL Class 5A
- Mascot: Viking
- Nickname: LHS
- Team name: The Vikings, Lady Vikings
- Rival: Northeast ECHS

Juan Navarro Early College High School (formerly Sidney Lanier High School) was established in 1961 as the sixth high school in the Austin Independent School District (AISD) and was originally located in the building which today houses Burnet Middle School. Lanier was named in honor of the Southern poet and Confederate veteran Sidney Lanier.

The current campus, opened in 1966, is located on Payton Gin Road. In 1997, Lanier was nationally recognized as a Blue Ribbon School, the highest honor a school could receive at the time. When it first opened, Lanier had virtually an all White student base with a highly active FFA chapter, but over the years it has become a primarily Mexican-American school with over 85% of its students being Hispanic.

The AISD Board of Trustees voted on March 24, 2019, to rename the school Juan Navarro High School. Juan Navarro was a 2007 graduate who died in Afghanistan from an improvised explosive device in July 2012.

== Notable alumni ==
- Tommy Boggs — first round draft pick and Major League Baseball pitcher
- Albert Burditt — professional basketball player
- Derrick Strait — professional football player
- Ken Harvey — four-time NFL Pro Bowl football player
