= Dawnna Dukes =

American politician (born 1963)

Member of the Texas House of Representatives from the 46th district
- In office January 14, 2003 – January 8, 2019
- Preceded by: Libby Linebarger
- Succeeded by: Sheryl Cole

Member of the Texas House of Representatives from the 50th district
- In office January 10, 1995 – January 14, 2003
- Preceded by: Wilhelmina Ruth Delco
- Succeeded by: Jack Stick (redistricting)

Personal details
- Born: Dawnna Mathilda Dukes; September 3, 1963 (age 63) Austin, Texas, U.S.
- Party: Democratic
- Education: Texas A&M University (BS)

Dawnna Mathilda Dukes (born September 3, 1963) is a former Democratic member of the Texas House of Representatives. First elected in 1994, Dukes represented Districts 50 and 46 (East Austin) within Travis County from 1995 to 2019.

On October 23, 2017, Travis County prosecutors dropped all charges against Dukes with prosecutors stating the charges should have never been filed in the first place. In 2017, Dukes was indicted by a grand jury on 13 felony charges and two misdemeanor charges related to abuse of public office. Later that year, all criminal charges against Dukes were dropped, with prosecutors saying the charges should not have been brought forward. Dukes announced plans to resign her seat but changed her mind and ran for re-election. She was defeated in the Democratic primary election on March 6, 2018.

== Background ==
After attending Texas A&M University, Dukes graduated with a B.S. in psychology. She worked as a criminal justice facilities planner from 1987 to 1993. Dukes then became the owner/ business consultant for DM Dukes and Associates, Inc., a consulting firm. Dukes is a member of the Flemming Fellowship Program, Alpha Kappa Alpha sorority, Center for Policy Alternative, Leadership Austin, and the Atlanta Council of Young Political Leaders.

== Political career ==
Dukes served in every legislative session from 1995–2018. In re-elections from 2008–2016, Dukes won by a margin of over 50 points. In 2018, she was defeated in the Democratic primary, receiving 10% of the vote, and coming in third in a field of six candidates.

Dukes served on the following committees: member of the Appropriations Committee, member of the International Trade and Intergovernmental Affairs, Vice Chair of Article II Subcommittee, and Vice Chair of Culture, Recreation, and Tourism.

Dukes was named one of the "Worst Legislators" in Texas by Texas Monthly magazine in 2017.

== False Criminal indictment ==
On October 23, 2017, Travis County prosecutors dropped all charges against Dukes with prosecutors stating the charges should have never been filed in the first place.

On January 18, 2017, a Travis County grand jury indicted Dukes on 15 criminal indictments (13 felonies and 2 misdemeanors) for tampering with a governmental record and abuse of official capacity by a public servant. According to the Austin American Statesman, "The 13 charges for tampering with public records concern allegations that Dukes collected pay from the state during the 2014 legislative interim for days that she did not travel to the Capitol, which is required under House rules. The American-Statesman in May reported that a former Dukes staffer had accused the legislator of filing requests for per diem payments for days that she never traveled to the Capitol and may not have worked at all." In addition, Dukes is also accused of failing to turn over her personal cell phone to investigators.

== Personal life ==
Dukes is Catholic.
