= Libby Linebarger =

American politician

Member of the Texas House of Representatives from the 46th district
- In office January 12, 1993 – January 10, 1995
- Preceded by: Edmund Kuempel
- Succeeded by: Alec Rhodes

Member of the Texas House of Representatives from the 47th district
- In office January 10, 1989 – January 12, 1993
- Preceded by: Anne Cooper
- Succeeded by: Susan Combs

Personal details
- Born: Elizabeth Ann Linebarger; November 29, 1947 Sinton, Texas
- Died: December 1, 2021 (aged 74) Austin, Texas
- Party: Democratic

Libby Linebarger (November 29, 1947 – December 1, 2021) was an American politician who served in the Texas House of Representatives from 1989 to 1995.

She died of pulmonary fibrosis on December 1, 2021, in Austin, Texas at age 74.
