= Susan Combs =

American politician (born 1945)

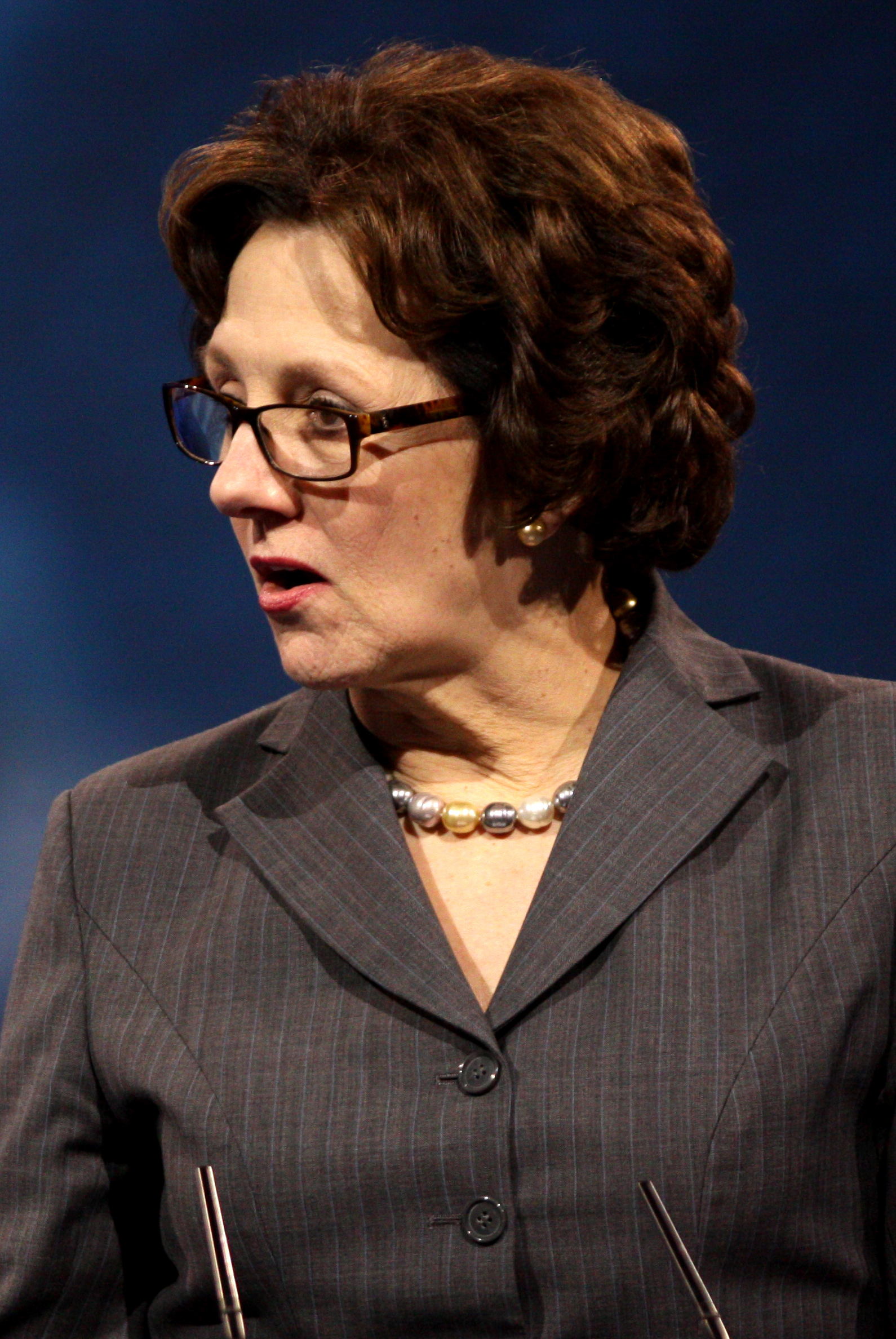
- Combs in 2013

Assistant Secretary of the Interior for Policy, Management, and Budget
- In office June 5, 2019 – April 25, 2020
- President: Donald Trump
- Preceded by: Rhea Suh
- Succeeded by: Winnie Stachelberg

37th Comptroller of Texas
- In office January 1, 2007 – January 1, 2015
- Governor: Rick Perry
- Preceded by: Carole Keeton
- Succeeded by: Glenn Hegar

10th Agriculture Commissioner of Texas
- In office January 5, 1999 – January 1, 2007
- Governor: George W. Bush; Rick Perry
- Preceded by: Rick Perry
- Succeeded by: Todd Staples

Member of the Texas House of Representatives from the 47th district
- In office January 12, 1993 – January 26, 1996
- Preceded by: Libby Linebarger
- Succeeded by: Patty Keel

Personal details
- Born: February 26, 1945 (age 81) San Antonio, Texas, U.S.
- Party: Republican
- Spouse: Joe Duran
- Children: 3
- Education: Vassar College (AB); University of Texas at Austin (JD)

Susan Combs (born February 26, 1945) is an American politician, having served elected office in Texas and as the assistant secretary of policy, management and budget at the U.S. Department of the Interior under President Donald Trump.

A member of the Republican Party, she served from 2007 to 2015 as the Texas Comptroller of Public Accounts. Prior to her tenure as comptroller, Combs had served two terms as commissioner of the Texas Department of Agriculture from 1999 to 2007, taking the reins as the first woman elected to that office in 1998. Combs also served two terms in the Texas House of Representatives.

== Early life and family ==
Combs was born in San Antonio. She grew up in a ranching family in West Texas. She runs a cow-calf operation on her family's ranch in Brewster County; the ranch has been in her family since the turn of the 20th century. She lives in Austin with her husband, Joe W. Duran, a computer scientist. She is the mother of three sons. Combs graduated from Vassar College in Poughkeepsie, New York, majoring in French and religion. She worked in international advertising in New York City, in the financial markets on Wall Street, and for the U.S. government before returning to Texas to obtain credentials from the University of Texas Law School at Austin. After graduation from law school, she served as an assistant district attorney in Dallas, Texas.

== Political career ==
Combs' first electoral outing was for the 47th legislative district, in Travis County. She won the Republican runoff election by seven votes over intraparty challenger Bill Welch. Combs polled 2,279 votes (50.07 percent) to Welch's 2,272 (49.92 percent). The two had led a five-candidate field in the primary. In the general election, Combs handily defeated the Democrat Jimmy Day, 45,355 (65.4 percent) to 23,987 (34.6 percent). Combs served two terms in the Texas House of Representatives from 1993 and 1996, resigning midway in her second term to join the staff of U.S. Senator Kay Bailey Hutchison as the lawmaker's state director. She was succeeded by fellow Republican Patty Keel of Austin.

=== Texas agriculture commissioner ===
Combs served as the Texas agriculture commissioner from 1999 to 2007, being the first woman to serve in the position. She succeeded Rick Perry as commissioner, who was instead elected as lieutenant governor.

As agriculture commissioner, Combs worked with the Environmental Defense Fund to protect the golden-cheeked warbler. In partnership with Combs and the Texas Department of Agriculture and a coalition of other organizations, Environmental Defense Fund coordinated the development of a market-based credit exchange. It allowed Fort Hood to quickly obtain offsets from nearby landowners to counteract losses from live-fire training activities and troop movement through core habitat areas.

=== Texas comptroller of public accounts ===
Combs was elected as Texas comptroller of public accounts to succeed Carole Strayhorn. Combs served as comptroller from 2007 to 2015. In 2010, Combs was unopposed for a second term as comptroller in the Republican primary, and she faced no Democratic opponent in the November 2 general election. Unsuccessful nominees of the Green and Libertarian parties did seek the position. Combs did not seek reelection to a third term as comptroller or any other statewide office in the 2014 elections.

In 2015, Combs endorsed Carly Fiorina for president.

=== Assistant secretary of the interior ===
On July 10, 2017, U.S. president Donald Trump nominated Combs to be the assistant secretary for policy, management, and budget at the United States Department of the Interior. Earlier in the year, Trump had considered naming Combs to be the secretary of agriculture, a position which went instead to Sonny Perdue, a former governor of Georgia. Her nomination to be the assistant secretary for policy, management, and budget was approved on a party-line vote in the Senate Energy and Natural Resources Committee. However, the full Senate did not take up her nomination and sent it back to the White House at the end of 2017. In 2018, the Trump administration re-nominated Combs to the same position. More than 70 conservation organizations sent a letter to the Senate opposing her nomination. She was confirmed by the United States Senate with a vote of 57–36 on June 5, 2019. On April 13, 2020, Combs submitted her resignation, which went into effect on April 25, 2020.

== Other activities ==
Combs served on the boards of the Texas and Southwestern Cattle Raisers Association in Fort Worth and the Texas Wildlife Association. She has also served on the boards of the Texas Beef Council and the Texas Production Credit Association.

After leaving state politics in 2015, Combs launched the Texas Smart Schools Initiative, intended for parents and officials as a data-driven approach to show which public schools and districts are achieving the highest student performance for the lowest cost. The material, arranged on a five-star scale, was made available without charge. It is funded from her leftover campaign contributions. "Public education is one of the largest items in the state budget; so Texans need to know where their dollars are getting the highest return in terms of student performance," Combs said. Also with leftover campaign cash, Combs formed a 501(c)(4) nonprofit called the Anywhere Woman Project, an online platform aiming to help women ask questions and exchange ideas.

In 2016, Combs launched "HERdacity" a "nonprofit online platform and mobile app" intended to "give women with shared interests and career ambitions a forum to exchange ideas and offer each other support." HERdacity's goal is to help women have the "audacity" to seek their own paths. In addition, she wrote a memoir entitled Texas Tenacity and two novels, Perfect Match and Up There. Her book Perfect Match caused political controversy.

As a member of the Texas House of Representatives in the 1990s, Combs championed legislation prohibiting state wildlife officials from gathering endangered species data from private lands without permission, according to the Austin Chronicle. It also sought to restrict the state from sharing endangered species data with the Fish and Wildlife Service.

In August 2019, the Women's Suffrage Celebration Commission elevated Combs to chairwoman. Prior to that, Combs was a Commission member, appointed to that position in December 2018.

== Awards ==
At the December 2, 2014, meeting of the Texas Interagency Task Force on Economic Growth and Endangered Species, Dr. Benjamin Tuggle presented Susan Combs, Texas Comptroller and Chair of the Task Force, with a plaque in recognition of her efforts to promote conservation in the State of Texas and the Southwest Region. Dr. Tuggle thanked the Comptroller for her dedication and commitment to expanding species research efforts and supporting on the ground conservation efforts in the State of Texas. He praised the Comptroller for her ability to bring together diverse stakeholder groups to tackle difficult conservation issues for a number of species including the dunes sagebrush lizard, the lesser prairie-chicken and the golden-cheeked warbler. Her willingness to work with the Fish and Wildlife Service on challenging issues benefited both the wildlife in Texas as well as the State's landowners and economy.

Party political offices
Preceded by Rick Perry	Republican nominee for Agriculture Commissioner of Texas; 1998, 2002	Succeeded by Todd Staples
Preceded by Carole Keeton Strayhorn	Republican nominee for Texas Comptroller of Public Accounts; 2006, 2010	Succeeded by Glenn Hegar
Texas House of Representatives
Preceded by Libby Linebarger	Member of the Texas House of Representatives from the 47th district 1993–1996	Succeeded by Patty Keel
Political offices
Preceded by Rick Perry	Agriculture Commissioner of Texas; 1999–2007	Succeeded by Todd Staples
Preceded by Carole Keeton	Comptroller of Texas; 2007–2015	Succeeded by Glenn Hegar
Preceded by ???	Assistant Secretary of the United States Department of the Interior; 2019–present	Succeeded by ???
