= Eastside High School (Austin, Texas) =

Coordinates: 30.2687°N 97.7088°W

Eastside Early College High School

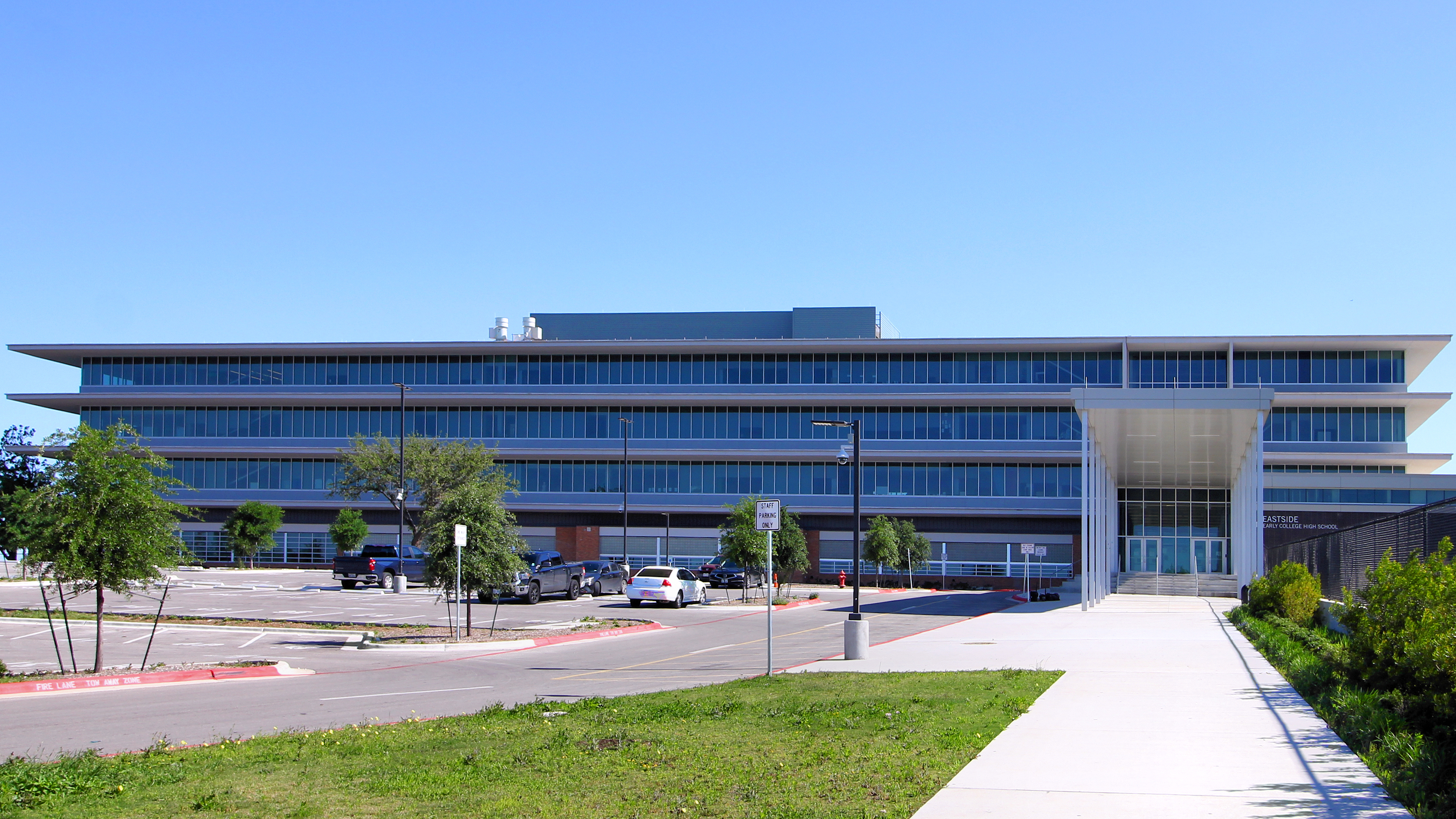

Location
- 900 Thompson Street; Austin, Texas 78702

Information
- School type: High School
- Established: 2008
- Principal: Susan Thames (Interim)
- Grades: 9-12th
- Enrollment: 629 (2025-2026)
- Language: English
- Area: East Austin, Texas
- Colors: Black and Silver
- Athletics conference: UIL Class 4A
- Mascot: Panthers
- Website: https://eastside.austinschools.org/

Eastside Early College High School (formerly Johnston High School, Eastside Memorial High School) is located in Austin, Texas. It is a part of the Austin Independent School District (AISD).

== History ==
In August 2008, Eastside Memorial High School opened in accord with AISD's reconstitution plan for the former Albert Sidney Johnston High School. The following year in August 2009, AISD's board of trustees voted to split the school into two separate programs, each with its own principal. The resultant schools were Eastside Memorial Global Tech (for grades 9-10,) under the leadership of Moises Ortiz, and Eastside Memorial Green Tech (for grades 9-12), under the leadership of Connor Grady. The two programs were merged back into a single school in May 2011, using the Public Education Information Management System (PEIMS) number of Green Tech. In October 2011, AISD Superintendent Meria Carstarphen announced a proposal the Eastside Memorial High School and Allan Elementary School could be managed by IDEA Public Schools, a charter organization from the Rio Grande Valley. In December, AISD's board of trustees approved the proposal for Allan Elementary School, with the charter expanding into Eastside Memorial in Fall 2013. One year later, in December 2014, the contract with IDEA was cancelled for both schools.

In December 2011, principal Joseph Coburn resigned, and Bryan Miller was named Interim Principal. Miller was confirmed as principal by AISD's board of trustees in March 2012.

The AISD Board of Trustees voted unanimously to contract with Talent Development Secondary of Johns Hopkins University to manage Eastside Memorial High School in May 2013. In April 2017, the Texas Education Agency announced that Eastside Memorial would become one of 3 high schools in AISD to offer an early college high school program where students have the opportunity to earn high school diploma and associate degree. The school would be officially renamed to Eastside Memorial Early College High School in August 2017.

As part of AISD's 2017 Bond program, Eastside Memorial relocated from the Johnston Campus to the Original L.C. Anderson High School campus. A new school building was built on the site. Since the school's namesake memorial remained at the Johnston campus, the school was renamed to Eastside Early College High School in April 2021.

== Sports ==
- Football
- Volleyball
- Baseball
- Softball
- Boys and Girls Cross Country
- Boys and Girls Basketball
- Boys and Girls Wrestling
- Boys and Girls Soccer
- Boys and Girls Track
- Boys and Girls Tennis
