= Northeast High School (Austin, Texas) =

Coordinates: 30.32414°N 97.691265°W

Northeast Early College High School

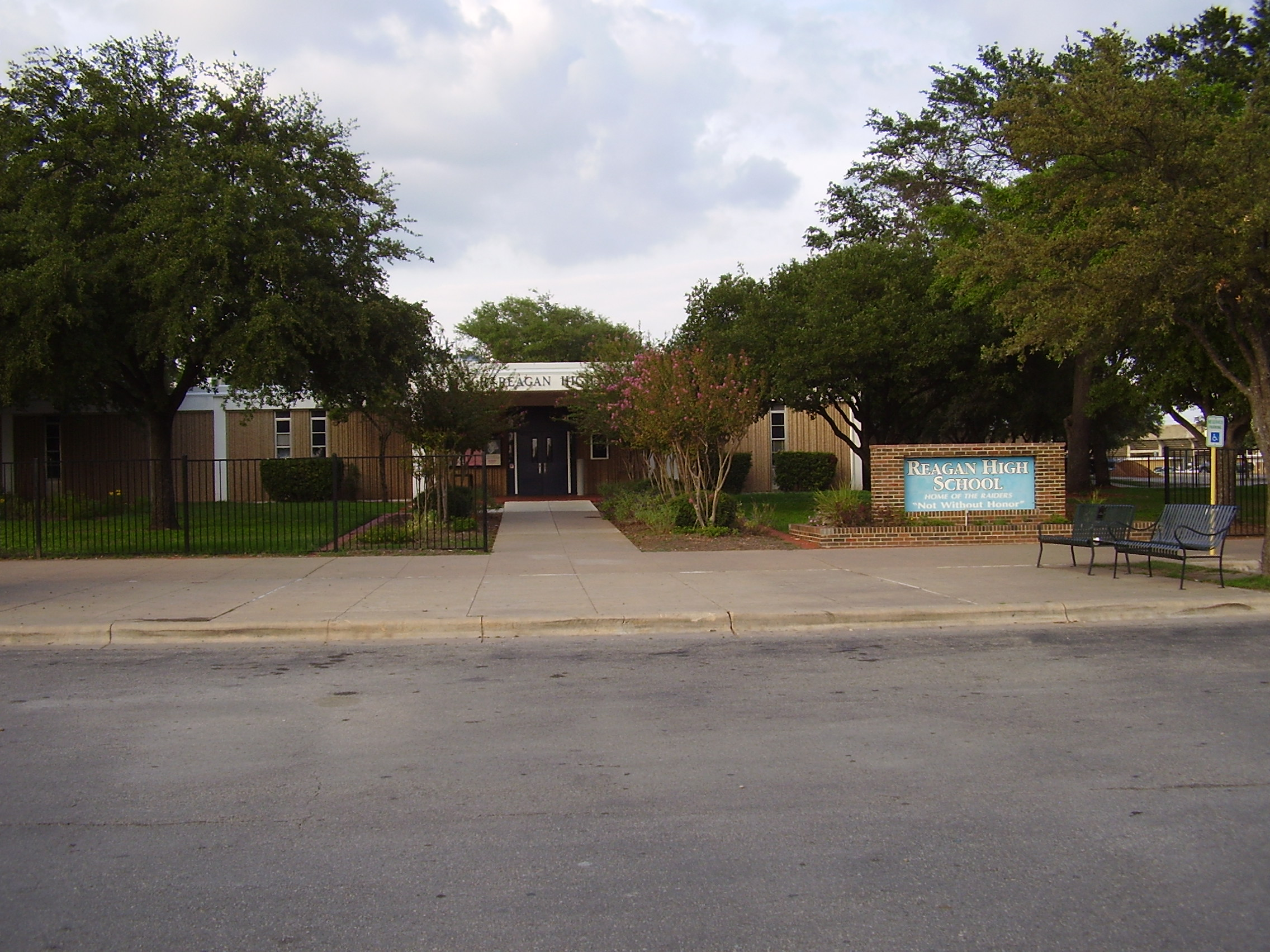

Location
- 7104 Berkman Drive; Austin, Texas; Austin, Travis 78752; United States

Information
- Opened: 1965
- School district: Austin Independent School District
- Principal: Nathan Neal
- Grades: 9-12
- Enrollment: 1,073 (2025-2026)
- Colors: Light blue and white
- Athletics conference: UIL Class 4A
- Mascot: Raider
- Rival: LBJ Early College High School
- Website: northeastechs.austinschools.org

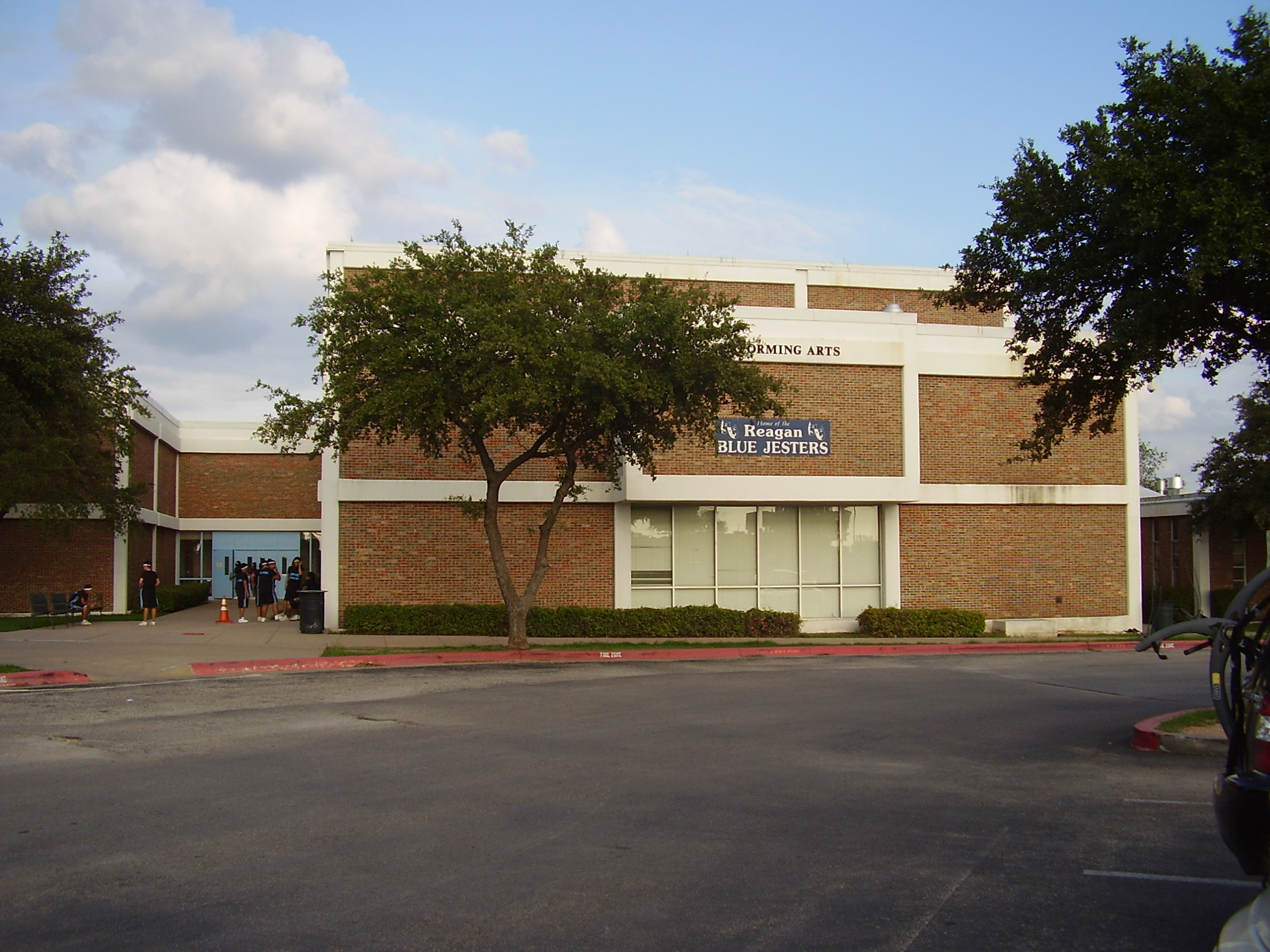
Performing Arts Building

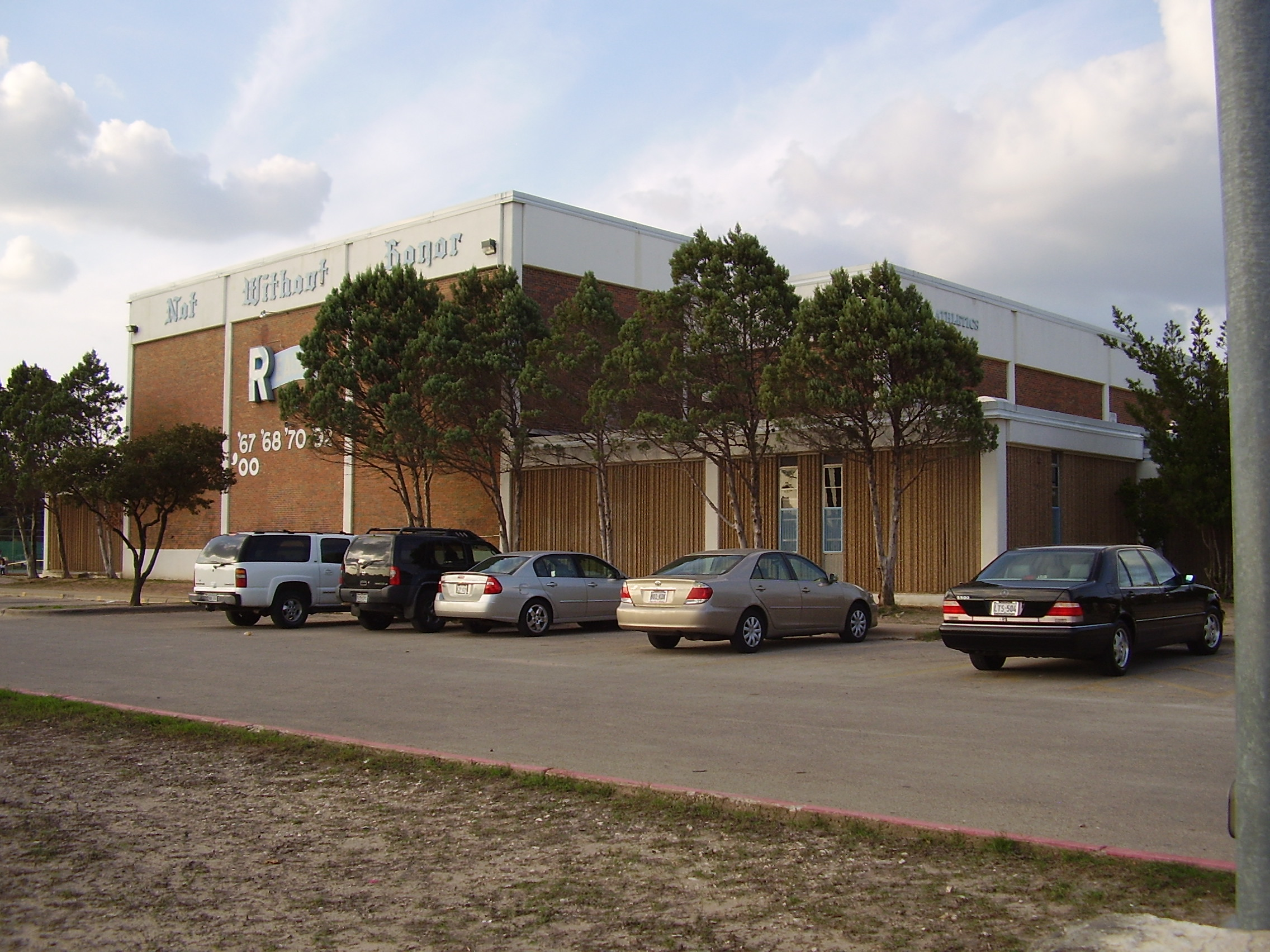
Athletics building

Northeast Early College High School is a public, coeducational secondary school in Austin, Texas. It is part of the Austin Independent School District. Northeast High School opened in 1965 and was originally named for John Henninger Reagan, a 19th–century U.S. Senator from Texas and the postmaster general of the Confederate States of America. Northeast High School was renamed before the 2019–2020 school year.

== 2023 shooting ==
On December 5, 2023, while school resource officer Sergeant Val Barnes was conducting his daily check at the high school, he was shot by 34–year–old Shane Matthew James Jr., as part of the 2023 Austin shootings. James Jr.'s attack on Sergeant Barnes was described as unprovoked as there had been no interaction between the two before James Jr. opened fire on the officer. The shooting prompted the campus to go into lockdown and James Jr. fled the scene and he would go on to kill four others and wound two others in the city, including another police officer before he was arrested following a car chase. Classes and all after–school activities were cancelled for the following day as a result of the attack.

== Athletics ==
For the first two decades of its existence, Reagan High School hosted a highly successful football program. Under coaches Travis Raven, Carroll Lundin and Wally Freytag, the Reagan Raiders formed a dynasty in Texas high school football from 1967 to 1994. In 1967, 1968 and 1970 the Raiders won Texas State Championships as well as being declared National Champions by then–US President Richard M. Nixon in 1970. In 1986, Donald Carr was the quarterback of a semifinalist playoff run in the Texas State Championships.

The program experienced another resurgence in football from 1998 to 2003 under head coach Andrew Jackson culminating with the Raiders losing to Bay City in the 2001 state semi–final game. From 2008 through 2010, Reagan High School experienced a significant resurgence in sports, going to the playoffs in consecutive years in basketball, having four students finish tops in wrestling, and the track team for boys and girls performing as one of the top teams in state.

== Music Program ==
Early in June, 1965, members from thirteen local and out–of–town bands, working with Northeast's first band director R.B. Hunger, formed the first 4A Raider Band. Early hours, hard practice and determination preceded the band's first public performance as the official Austin Aqua Festival Band. Two concerts, one for the dedication of John H. Reagan High School and another for the Texas School Administrators and School Board Convention, kicked off a colorful marching season topped by a Division I Rating in the early November marching contest. Long before Christmas, band members began preparations for U.I.L. solo and ensemble contest. Their diligence paid off in fifty–six Division I ratings. Immediately, work was begun on the remaining activities: a spring concert, a school–wide assembly, concert contest, awards day and finally, graduation ceremonies. The year ended successfully with a Division I in concert and, as Mr. Hunger said, we had a band that could sight–read like no other! From pep rallies to planting the flower bed to rivalry with the RR's, the first Raider Band showed a spirit and loyalty which proved them to be truly "NOT WITHOUT HONOR". Notes by Susan Osborn

The Northeast choir traditionally ended choir concerts, graduation and other school events by singing "The Lord Bless you and Keep you", by Peter Lutkin. This tradition began with Northeast's first choir director, Jim Sheppard.

Archival footage of the school’s marching band, performing in a 1969 parade in honor of Apollo 11 astronaut Neil Armstrong, is seen during the closing credits of Operation Avalanche, a 2016 film built on the premise of faking the Moon landing portion of the Apollo 11 mission.

== Notable alumni ==
- Elliott Hill, current CEO of Nike, Inc; graduated 1982
- Reggie Brown, Detroit Lions linebacker; graduated 1992
- Brendan Christian, Olympic sprinter; graduated 2002
- Dawnna Dukes, former Texas State Representative; graduated 1981
- Bill Greif, San Diego Padres pitcher; graduated 1968
- Donna Howard, Texas State Representative; graduated 1969
- Ron Kirk, former U.S. Trade Representative; former Mayor of Dallas; graduated 1972
- Austin Ligon, Co–founder and retired CEO of CarMax; graduated 1969
- Mark Welsh, former Chief of Staff, United States Air Force, and current president of Texas A&M University; graduated 1971
