= Macomb High School =

Location
- 1525 S Johnson Street; Macomb, McDonough, Illinois 61455; United States; 40.4437°N 90.67345°W

Information
- Type: Public
- School district: Macomb Community Unit School District 185
- Principal: James Heuer
- Faculty: 75
- Teaching staff: 43.7 (FTE)
- Grades: 9–12
- Enrollment: 607 (2024-2025)
- Student to teacher ratio: 18:1
- Campus: City
- Colors: Orange; Black
- Athletics: IHSA
- Athletics conference: Prairieland Conference
- Team name: Bombers
- Website: www.macomb185.org/176/Macomb-Senior-High-School

Macomb High School is a public four-year high school located in Macomb, Illinois, a city in McDonough County, Illinois, in the United States. MHS is part of Macomb Community Unit School District 185, which also includes MacArthur Early Childhood Center, Lincoln Elementary School, Edison Elementary School, and Macomb Middle School. The school draws students from the communities of Macomb, Bardolph, Adair, and Georgetown. Macomb Middle School was built just south of Macomb High School and was completed in 2023.

== Academics ==
Macomb High School is currently Fully Recognized by making adequate yearly progress and complying with state tests and standards. In 2009, 71% of students tested met or exceeded standards. MHS made Adequate Yearly Progress in 2009 on the Prairie State Achievement Examination, a state test that is part of the No Child Left Behind Act. The school's average high school graduation rate in 2025 was 86.9%. School enrollment decreased from 623 to 565 (9%) in the period of 2000–2009.

In 2025, the faculty consisted of 52 teachers, of whom 51% held an advanced degree. The average class size was 18.7. The student to faculty ratio was 18:1. The district's instructional expenditure per student was $16,375.

== Athletics ==
Macomb High School competes in the Prairieland Conference and is a member school in the Illinois High School Association.

=== Boys ===
- Baseball
- Basketball
- Cross Country
- Football
- Golf
- Soccer
- Swimming
- Tennis
- Track & Field
- Wrestling

=== Girls ===
- Basketball
- Cheerleading
- Cross Country
- Dance
- Golf
- Softball
- Soccer
- Swimming
- Tennis
- Track & Field
- Volleyball
- Wrestling

=== Notable Team State Finishes ===
- Drama: 1942–43 (1st)
- Scholastic Bowl:
  - IHSA State Finals:
    - 2024-25 (5th in the Small Schools Division)
    - 2012-13 (3rd)
    - 2011-12 (2nd)
    - 2010–11 (2nd)
    - 2009–10 (3rd)

=== Notable Team National Finishes ===
- Scholastic Bowl:
  - NAQT National Championship Tournament (SSNCT - 500 students or less per grade):
    - 2024-25 (5th)
    - 2023-24 (13th)
    - 2022-23 (13th)
    - 2021-22 (11th)
    - 2020-21 (2nd)
    - 2018-19 (5th)
    - 2017-18 (15th)
    - 2016-17 (4th)
    - 2015-16 (2nd)
    - 2014-15 (7th)
    - 2013-14 (7th)
    - 2012-13 National Champions

== Consolidations ==
Adair High School consolidated into Macomb High School in 1952 and Bardolph High School consolidated into Macomb High School in 1973.

== Notable faculty ==
- Molly Selders, 2022 Yale Educator Award Winner for Excellence in High School Education.

== Notable alumni ==
- Phil Bradley, Former MLB player (Seattle Mariners, Philadelphia Phillies, Baltimore Orioles, Chicago White Sox).
- C. T. Vivian, civil rights leader and 2013 recipient of the Presidential Medal of Freedom.
