= National Tournament of Academic Excellence =

The National Tournament of Academic Excellence (NTAE) (formerly known as the Panasonic Academic Challenge [PAC]) is a national high school academic competition run by the Florida Department of Education. The tournament resembles the Florida's own Commissioner's Academic Challenge, which is a type of quiz bowl format. The NTAE had been run in June starting in 1988. Sponsorship from Panasonic ended in 2008 and after 2009 the tournament was not held for several years until was it revived again in 2014.

== Match format ==
The format used in the NTAE is unique among all other national tournaments, and is based on the format used for the Commissioner's Academic Challenge, which is Florida's quizbowl state tournament for school districts. This is also the tournament used to select the team that represents Florida at the NTAE.

While most tournaments involve two teams playing in a head-to-head format, the NTAE involves matches of between four and six teams playing against each other in the same competition room. Each team starts with 100 points.

Each match is divided into three untimed periods. The first period consists of 20 questions, each worth five points. The second period consists of 20 questions, each worth ten points, and the final round consists of 25 questions, each worth fifteen points. Each question has a one-minute time limit in which teams may answer. Teams answering incorrectly are penalized the point value of the question. A team is eliminated from competition if their point total reaches zero, but this a very rare occurrence.

At the end of each period, each team participates in a written team question which has a variable time limit, and a variable number of questions. The written team question after each of the three periods is worth (respectively) a maximum of ten, twenty, and thirty points. There are no penalties for incorrect answers in this phase of the competition. These written questions are non-competitive, and each team may earn the maximum number of points.

At the end of each match, teams are ranked according to their point totals. A tie-breaker occurs only if a tie results among teams that will be advancing to a future match.

Aside from the written team questions, there are no bonus questions which are prevalent in most other quizbowl formats. There is also the absence of "rebounding" a missed question. That is, once a question is attempted, whether the answer given is correct or incorrect, the question ends, and no other team is given the opportunity to answer.

Adding to the challenge, each team is permitted only one button to indicate they are ready to answer, and to lock out other teams from responding (aka "buzzer"). Most other formats allow each player to have their own buzzer.

== Topic and question formats ==
The questions used in the NTAE are wholly unique among national tournaments. Unlike most other tournaments there are multiple choice and matching questions, some of which can be deceptively difficult. There are also "fill-in-the-blank style questions," as well as free response questions (standard to high school quizbowl).

While topics range across the academic canon, there is an overall de-emphasis of pop culture questions, and a marked increase in the number of mathematics questions (teams are provided calculators). Foreign language is also utilized often, with teams usually choosing from amongst French or Spanish questions (in the past, German and Latin were options, but these have been discontinued).

There are also visual questions displayed on a television monitor, and audio questions played from recordings. While these two question formats can be used for any question category, audio questions are most often used for music and foreign language questions, while video questions are most often used for art questions.

== Tournament format ==
The tournament is usually held during the second or third week of June, starting on a Sunday, and ending on a Tuesday. The tournament is usually held at the convention center of the Contemporary Resort Hotel at Walt Disney World in Orlando, Florida.

Teams are randomly assigned to a first round match. Historically, each first round match has either four or five teams in each competition room. Winning teams automatically advance to the semifinals. Teams not winning in the first round are randomly assigned to a consolation match, and compete on Monday. Winners of each consolation match also advance to the semifinals.

There are usually three semifinal matches played on Tuesday morning. The top two teams from each semifinal advance to the championship round, held on Tuesday afternoon.

Coaches are not permitted to challenge the game officials, though players are permitted to do so. Each match generally has at least one judge who is a specialist in each academic area.

== Team qualifications ==
An unusual feature of this tournament is that teams do not necessarily qualify based on performance during the past season, as is the case in most other national quizbowl tournaments. The Board of Education (or equivalent body) of each U.S. state and territory is given the power to select a team in any way they see fit. Some teams come from a single school, and are usually the quizbowl champion of that state. In other cases, the Board of Education gives selection power to a committee who chooses an all-star team from among that state's best players. Thus each state or territory can enter only one team, and is referred to at the tournament as (for example) Team Alabama or Team Oklahoma.

== Sponsorship and prizes ==
Another unique fixture of this tournament are the resources committed by corporate and government sponsorship. Since its inception, the tournament has been sponsored by the school systems of the Florida counties of Pinellas and Polk, with the Florida Department of Education joining in the tournament's third year. Herff Jones has also been sponsors since the first year of the tournament. Other past corporate sponsors have included Publix Super Markets and Disney.

From 1992 to 2008, Panasonic was the title sponsor of the event. The Pepsi Bottling Group was also a longtime sponsor.

This corporate sponsorship allows for one of the largest prize packages in high school quizbowl. The top six teams each earn trophies, which are sent to the governors of the respective states or territories. The members of each of the top three teams earn scholarships ($2000, $1000, and $500 per team member, respectively), and earn championship rings. An "all-tournament" team is selected based on geography and individual performance in the first round of competition. These players earn medals and scholarship money.

== Past NTAE results ==
YEAR	CHAMPION	RUNNER-UP	THIRD PLACE	FOURTH PLACE	FIFTH PLACE	SIXTH PLACE
1988	Maryland	Tennessee	New York	Louisiana	Florida	Georgia
1989	Maryland	Ohio	Virginia	South Carolina	New York	Michigan
1990	Kentucky	Georgia	Maryland	Florida	Wisconsin	New York
1991	South Carolina	Virginia	Wisconsin	Indiana	Oklahoma	New Jersey
1992	Maryland	Kentucky	New Jersey	Florida	South Carolina	Georgia
1993	California	Maryland	South Carolina	Kentucky	Iowa	Oregon
1994	Virginia	Wisconsin	Kentucky			
1995	Florida	South Carolina	Maryland	Pennsylvania		
1996	Maryland	South Carolina	Alabama	Oklahoma	Pennsylvania	Georgia
1997	Texas	Maryland	Wisconsin	unknown	Minnesota	Pennsylvania
1998	Maryland	Florida	District of Columbia	unknown	Illinois	unknown
1999	Florida	South Carolina	Maryland	Missouri	Tennessee	Texas
2000	Maryland	Kentucky	Missouri	Illinois	Georgia	Alabama
2001	District of Columbia	Florida	Maryland	Vermont	Kentucky	South Carolina
2002	Maryland	Illinois	South Carolina	Virginia	Georgia	Texas
2003	Virginia	Florida	South Carolina	Texas	Pennsylvania	Ohio
2004	Virginia	Missouri	Illinois	District of Columbia	Kentucky	Colorado
2005	Virginia	Maryland	Illinois	Florida	Colorado	Wisconsin
2006	Maryland	Florida	Missouri	Pennsylvania	Virginia	Tennessee
2007	Illinois	Missouri	Florida	California	District of Columbia	Kentucky
2008	Illinois	Florida	South Carolina	Kentucky	Tennessee	California
2009	Kentucky	Oklahoma	Colorado	South Carolina	Florida	Ohio
2014	Florida	Pennsylvania	Oklahoma	Colorado	Louisiana	Ohio
2015	Colorado	Ohio	Oklahoma	Louisiana	Florida	Pennsylvania

== See also ==
- NAQT
- PACE
