= ECG (disambiguation) =

ECG may refer to:

== Science and medicine ==
- Electrocardiogram
- Electrocardiography
- Epicatechin gallate
- Equine chorionic gonadotropin

== Other uses ==
- The Early College at Guilford, in Greensboro, North Carolina, United States
- East Central German, a dialect of German
- East Coast Greenway, a long-distance trail in the United States
- Economy for the Common Good
- Electricity Company of Ghana
- Elizabeth City Regional Airport, in North Carolina, United States
- Environment Conservation Group, an Indian conservation organization
- Essex County Ground, a cricket ground in Chelmsford, England
