= National Academic Quiz Tournaments =

American quiz bowl company

- Type: Limited liability company
- Industry: Quiz bowl
- Headquarters: Shawnee, Kansas; Twin Cities, Minnesota, U.S.
- Key people: Seth Teitler (President); Jonah Greenthal (Vice President for Operations); Jeff Hoppes (Vice President for Communication); Chad Kubicek (Chief Financial Officer); Jason Thompson (Chief Editor)
- Services: Question writing, tournament organizing
- Website: naqt.com/

National Academic Quiz Tournaments, LLC is a question-writing and quiz bowl tournament-organizing company founded by former players in 1996. It is unique among U.S. quiz organizations for supplying questions and hosting championships at the middle school, high school, and college levels. NAQT operates out of Shawnee, Kansas and Minneapolis–Saint Paul.

The company mostly writes practice questions and questions for high school and middle school invitational tournaments, as well as for some game shows. Its involvement in college quiz bowl is mostly restricted to sectional tournaments and the Intercollegiate Championship Tournament.

== Rules ==
NAQT's rules are similar to those of other quiz bowl tournaments. These are about qualification, packets, and gameplay.

=== Qualification ===
To qualify for the MSNCT or HSNCT, a team from a school must place in the top 20% of a tournament, rounded up. SSNCT has the same requirement, however only Small Schools (500≤ students in the top 3 grades) are considered. A school can get more teams also depending on pool size. The events which you must qualify at must be organized and accepted and using NAQT packets. Qualifying once in multiple tournaments does not yield multiple invitations. To receive multiple invitations, a school must meet the requirements on multiple teams at the same tournament (usually labeled SCHOOLNAME A, B, C, etc.)

=== Packets ===
NAQT creates their own packets for tournaments along for studying, such as specific subject, lightning rounds, Thumbs Up! and more. They consist of 24 tossups and 24 bonuses. For certain packets, tossups and bonuses are on the same page, but for HSNCT, MSNCT, and SSNCT, the tossups and bonuses are on separate pages. They consist of clues that become easier and end in 'For 10 points'. They will also provide pronunciation on certain words and provide what to accept, prompt, or say is incorrect.

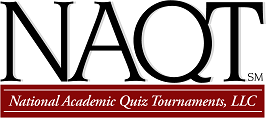
The old logo of NAQT which was changed in mid 2025

=== Gameplay ===
The rules about negs and powers are that negs give -5, but if another team interrupts and gets it wrong, it is a 0. Correct answers before the power mark, or (*), give 15 points. Protests can be made at timeouts, halftime, or the end of the game. If a player answers incorrectly, their team is locked for the tossup. Bounce-backs are not allowed in NAQT tournaments, but may be used in tournaments using NAQT questions. Timeouts can be called at the very beginning of any tossup, but a team is limited to 1 tossup per match. A score-check is allowed during the timeouts and halftime.

== At the college level ==
The ICT is divided into divisions, unlike ACF Nationals, so that a clear undergraduate champion is determined (all formats allow graduate students to compete in some form).

=== Collegiate divisions ===
==== Division I Overall ====
NAQT's eligibility rules state that any student taking at least three credit hours towards a degree at a university may compete on that university's team, and indeed may not compete independently if such a team exists. If no program exists at their university's campus, they may compete on the team for another campus of the same university, with the provision that they must leave that team should their home campus organize a program.

If any member of the team has an undergraduate degree, the team competes in the Division I competition, and is only eligible for the open championship (i.e. the overall championship).

==== Division I Undergraduate ====
At Sectional Championship Tournaments (SCTs) and the Intercollegiate Championship Tournament (ICT), teams that do not meet the Division II requirements play together. However, awards are given, including bids to the ICT, for the top undergraduate team. A team is eligible for the undergraduate championship if all members of the team are undergraduate students, and none of them have played in four years of NAQT collegiate competition prior to the current year. The undergraduate championship was first awarded in 1998.

==== Division II ====
Also introduced in 1998, Division II is intended to give first- and second-year students an opportunity to compete against other players and teams of the same level of experience. The rules of Division II eligibility are that one must be eligible for DI Undergraduate (i.e. no degree, and less than four years of experience), and in no year prior qualified for or participated in ICT.

Exceptions to the eligibility rules have been granted to deal with special circumstances in past years; however, as they are controversial when they occur, they do not occur often.

==== Community colleges ====
Two-year colleges usually compete in separate SCTs each February (it is permitted, but rare, for teams from these schools to compete in DI). Eight teams qualify for the Division II ICT, where they compete alongside other DII teams in a manner analogous to that of DI Undergraduate teams. However, students at two-year colleges are exempt from the DII eligibility restrictions. In fact, they have three years of eligibility at the DII level.

=== Winners of NAQT Intercollegiate Championship Tournament ===
Year	Host / Location	Division I Overall	Division I Undergraduate	Division II Overall	Division II Community College
1997	Penn	Chicago	—N/a	—N/a	—N/a
1998	Vanderbilt	Stanford	Swarthmore	Harvard	—N/a
1999	Michigan	Chicago	Carleton	Princeton	—N/a
2000	Boston U	Illinois	Princeton	Harvard	—N/a
2001	WUSTL	Chicago	Princeton	Pittsburgh	—N/a
2002	North Carolina	Michigan	Princeton	Yale	Valencia CC
2003	UCLA and Caltech	Chicago	Harvard	California	Valencia CC
2004	WUSTL	California	Illinois	UCLA	Valencia CC
2005	Tulane	Michigan	VCU	Chicago	Faulkner St CC
2006	Maryland	California	Williams College	Stanford	Broward CC
2007	Minnesota	Chicago	Carleton	Maryland	Valencia CC
2008	WUSTL	Maryland	Harvard	Carleton	Valencia CC
2009	Dallas, Texas	Chicago	Minnesota (Note: Though Harvard had initially won these titles, NAQT vacated their wins in 2013 after Harvard player Andy Watkins was found to have had unauthorized access to the questions prior to the tournaments.)	Chicago	Northeast Alabama CC
2010	Chicago, Illinois	Chicago	Minnesota	Brown	St. Charles CC
2011	Chicago, Illinois	Minnesota	VCU	Yale	Chipola
2012	Chicago, Illinois	Virginia	Ohio State (Note: MIT had initially won the 2012 ICT DI Undergraduate title, but their win was vacated after MIT player Joshua Alman was found to have had unauthorized access to the questions prior to the tournament.)	Harvard	Chipola
2013	Chicago, Illinois	Yale	Ohio State	Stanford	Chipola
2014	Chicago, Illinois	Virginia	Yale	Harvard	Valencia CC
2015	Atlanta, Georgia	Virginia	Maryland	Texas	State College-Manatee
2016	Chicago, Illinois	Chicago	California	Chicago	Jefferson
2017	Chicago, Illinois	Michigan	Oklahoma	California	Chipola
2018	Chicago, Illinois	Yale	California	Chicago	Chipola
2019	Chicago, Illinois	Yale	Michigan State	Maryland	De Anza
2020	Canceled	N/A	N/A	N/A	Valencia CC
2021	Online	Columbia	Brown	Vanderbilt	Jefferson
2022	Chicago, Illinois	Stanford	Georgia Tech	Yale	Inver Hills CC
2023	Chicago, Illinois	Cornell	Brown	Waterloo	Tallahassee CC
2024	Chicago, Illinois	Chicago	WUSTL	Waterloo	Chipola
2025	Chicago, Illinois	Chicago	Cornell	Harvard	Chipola
2026	Chicago, Illinois	California	Virginia Tech	Columbia	Chipola

== At the high school level ==
Teams qualify to the High School National Championship Tournament through a variety of methods. Most commonly, a team qualifies by finishing in the top 15% of the field at a tournament that uses NAQT questions. If a school wants to send more than one team to nationals, the school must qualify all said teams at the same time during a single tournament.

The small school award is given to a public school with a non-selective admissions policy and less than 500 students in grades 10 through 12. Up until and including 2013, the small school champion was decided on a playoff between top finishing teams at the High School National Championship Tournament. Since 2014, a separate national championship tournament has been held for small schools.

=== Winners of NAQT High School National Championship Tournament ===
The winners of the NAQT High School National Championship Tournament:

Year	Location	Champion	2nd	3rd	Small school
1999	Norman, Oklahoma	Detroit Catholic Central	Walton	Brookwood A	—N/a
2000	Atlanta, Georgia	State College A	Maggie Walker A	Eleanor Roosevelt	—N/a
2001	Ann Arbor, Michigan	Detroit Catholic Central	Detroit Country Day	State College A	—N/a
2002	Austin, Texas	St. John's School	Irmo	Detroit Catholic Central	Kent City
2003	Myrtle Beach, South Carolina	Thomas Jefferson A	Dorman A	St. John's	Cutter–Morning Star
2004	Houston, Texas	Thomas Jefferson A	Maggie Walker	St. John's A	Cutter–Morning Star
2005	Chicago, Illinois	Thomas Jefferson A	Lakeside	State College A	Danville
2006	Chicago, Illinois	Richard Montgomery	State College A	Maggie Walker A	Danville
2007	Chicago, Illinois	Maggie Walker A	State College A	Thomas Jefferson A	Danville
2008	Chicago, Illinois	Thomas Jefferson A	Charter School of Wilmington A	Walt Whitman A	Russell
2009	Chicago, Illinois	Charter School of Wilmington A	Dorman A	State College A	Ottawa Hills
2010	Chicago, Illinois	Maggie Walker	State College A	LASA A	South Range
2011	Atlanta, Georgia	State College A	LASA A	Bellarmine	George Mason
2012	Atlanta, Georgia	Bellarmine A	Detroit Catholic Central A	LASA A	Beachwood
2013	Atlanta, Georgia	LASA A	Ladue A	Loyola	Macomb
2014	Chicago, Illinois	LASA A	St. John's A	LASA B	Hallsville
2015	Chicago, Illinois	Arcadia A	LASA A	Detroit Catholic Central A	Harmony Science North Austin
2016	Dallas, Texas	Hunter A	Thomas Jefferson A	Detroit Catholic Central A	Advanced Math & Science
2017	Atlanta, Georgia	Hunter A	Detroit Catholic Central A	Naperville North	Glasgow and St. Mark's
2018	Atlanta, Georgia	Plano West A	Hunter A	LASA A	Glasgow and Early College at Guilford
2019	Atlanta, Georgia	Beavercreek	University Lab	Chattahoochee A	Glasgow and Miami Valley
2020	Canceled	N/A	N/A	N/A	N/A
2021	Online	Barrington	University Lab	Detroit Country Day	Westmont and St. Mark's
2022	Atlanta, Georgia	Detroit Catholic Central A	Hunter A	East Chapel Hill A	Glasgow and St. Mark's
2023	Atlanta, Georgia	Barrington A	Buffalo Grove	Detroit Country Day A	Fair Grove and BASIS McLean
2024	Atlanta, Georgia	Barrington A	St. Mark's	Livingston A	Hastings and St. Mark's
2025	Atlanta, Georgia	Livingston A	Northview	Wade Hampton	West Point and St. Mark's
2026	Atlanta, Georgia	Stevenson A	Lexington A	Strake Jesuit A	Russell and Park Tudor

== At the middle school level ==
In the 2010–2011 academic year, NAQT introduced a program for middle school. A corresponding middle school national championship, called the MSNCT, was held in 2011 in Chicago.

MSNCT is primarily held at the Hyatt Regency O'Hare in Rosemont, Illinois.

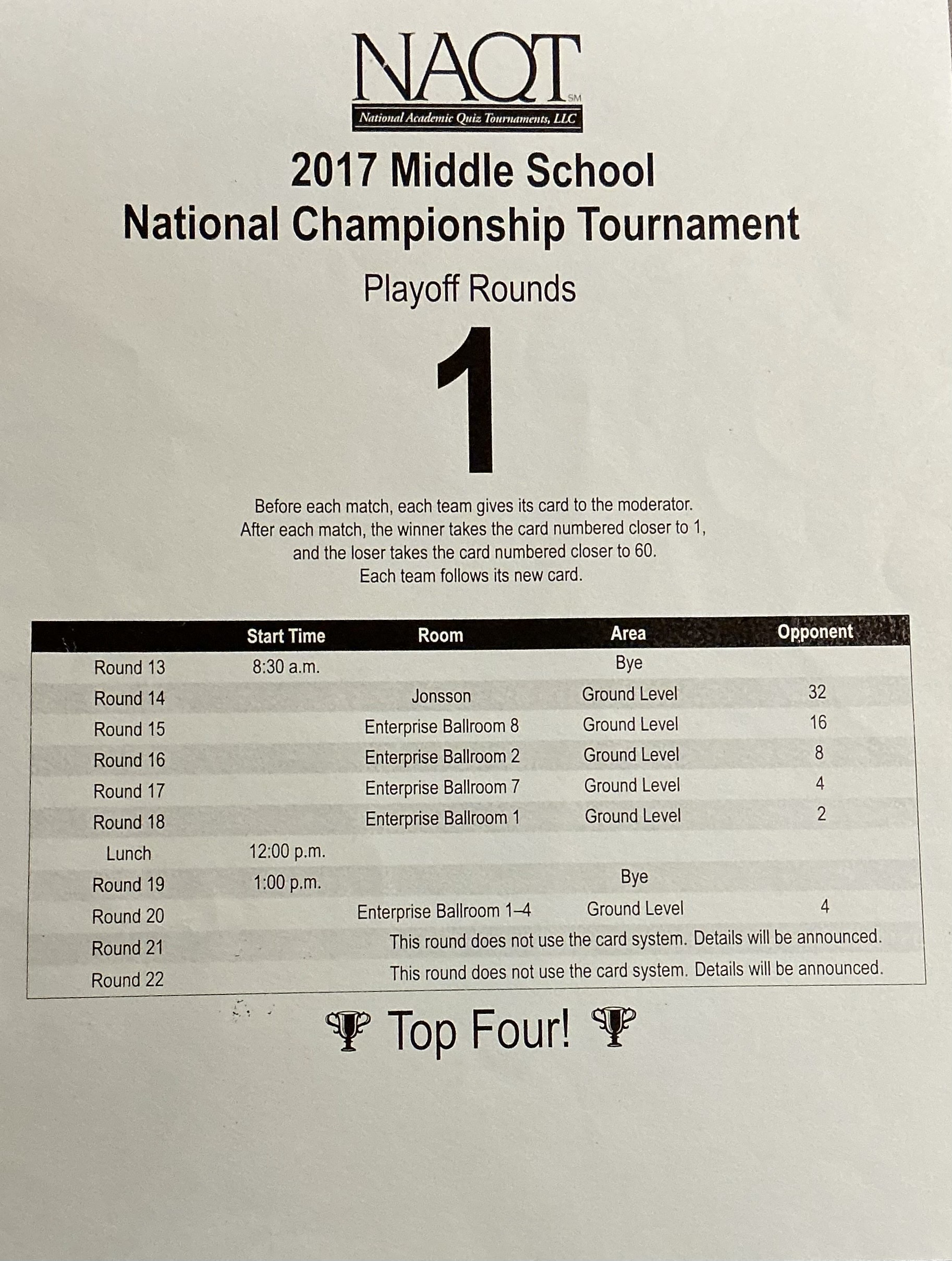
The 1 card from the 2017 NAQT MSNCT playoffs.

=== Winners of NAQT Middle School National Championship Tournament ===
Year	Location	Champion	2nd	3rd
2011	Chicago, Illinois	Kealing A	Barrington-Station A	Longfellow
2012	Chicago, Illinois	Kealing A	Longfellow A	Westminster A
2013	Chicago, Illinois	Barrington-Station A	Kealing A	Mesa Verde
2014	Atlanta, Georgia	Harmony Excellence-Houston	St. Mark's	Trickum
2015	Dallas, Texas	Kealing A	T. H. Rogers A	River Trail A
2016	Atlanta, Georgia	Middlesex A	Longfellow A	Challenger-Ardenwood
2017	Dallas, Texas	Aptakisic	Mounds Park	Middlesex A
2018	Chicago, Illinois	Pi-oneers (Note: Home-school collective from Cupertino, California)	BASIS Silicon Valley A	Longfellow A
2019	Chicago, Illinois	Hunter A	Churchill A	Hopkins
2020	Canceled	N/A	N/A	N/A
2021	Online	Churchill A	Longfellow A	Burleigh Manor A
2022	Chicago, Illinois	Longfellow A	Chenery	Greenhill A
2023	Chicago, Illinois	Chenery	River Trail A	Cooper A
2024	Chicago, Illinois	River Trail A	Sycamore A	Hopkins A
2025	Chicago, Illinois	Smith A	Coppell West	Meyzeek A
2026	Chicago, Illinois	St. Mark's A	Riverwatch A	Challenger-Strawberry Park

== Jeopardy! ==
Various NAQT employees and former NAQT players have appeared on the game show Jeopardy! Over 30 NAQT players or employees have participated on the show, including 17 who qualified for the Ultimate Tournament of Champions, including two finalists, Brad Rutter and Ken Jennings. Jennings writes questions and edits the literature and mythology categories for NAQT. Due to the success of these players, adults trying out must now declare any affiliation to NAQT or quizbowl on their information sheet. (See Jeopardy! audition process for further discussion.)

In 2006, competitors in the High School National Championship Tournament were given the opportunity to audition for the Jeopardy! Teen Tournament and the Jeopardy! College Championship. Ben Schenkel of Moravian Academy (Allentown, Pennsylvania) qualified for the Teen Tournament at this tryout, and finished as the tournament's first runner-up. Meryl Federman of Livingston High School (Livingston, New Jersey) qualified for the second edition of the teen tournament, called the Jeopardy! Teen Tournament Summer Games, and won.

== See also ==
- Quiz bowl
- PACE
- United States Academic Decathlon
- Academic Competition Federation
- National History Bee and Bowl
- College Bowl
