= Richard Montgomery High School =

Public high school in Maryland, US

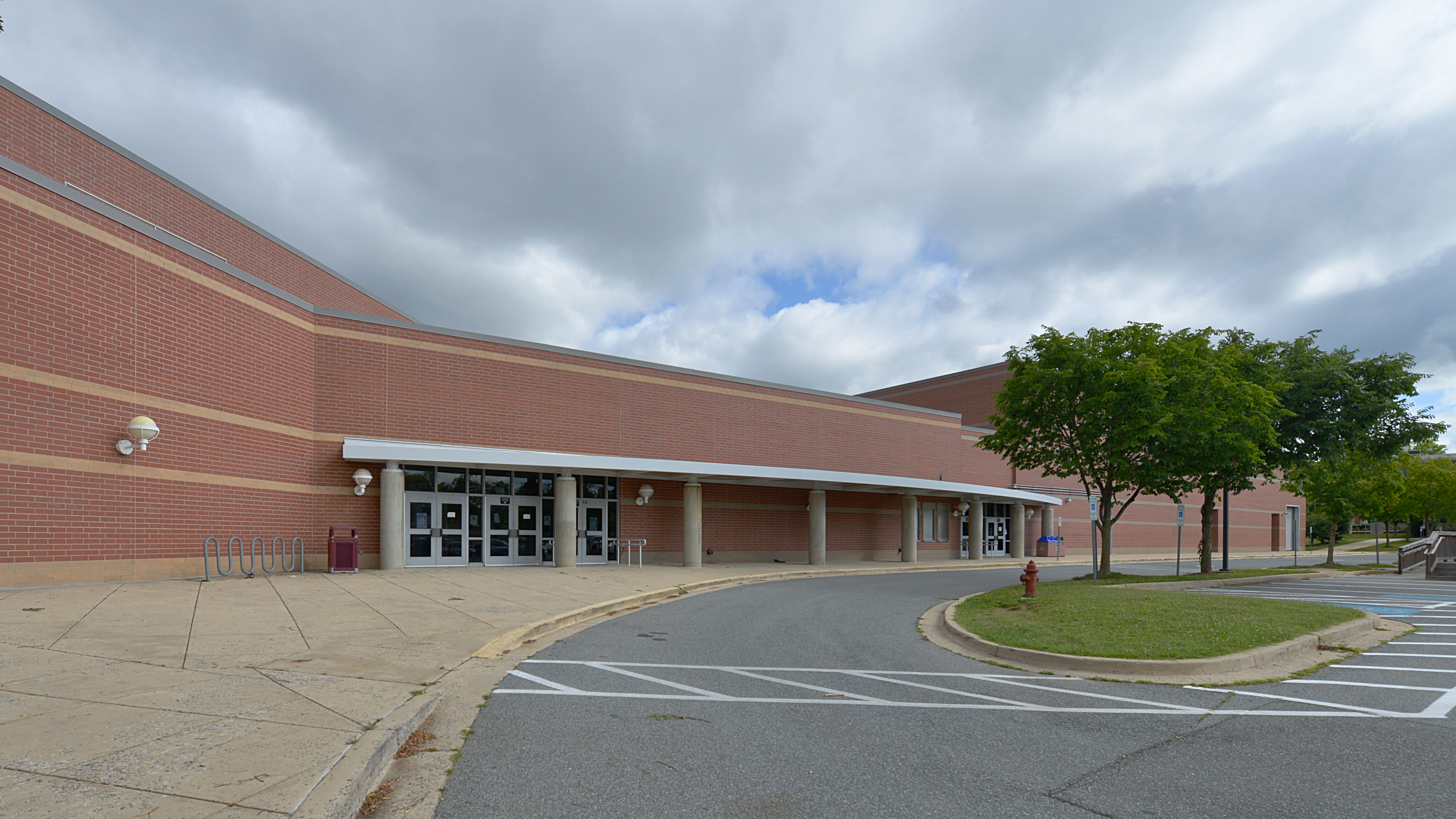

Location
- 250 Richard Montgomery Drive; Rockville, Maryland 20852; United States; 39°04′42″N 77°08′45″W

Information
- Type: Public (magnet) high school
- Established: 1892; 134 years ago
- School district: Montgomery County Public Schools
- CEEB code: 210910
- NCES School ID: 240048000902
- Principal: Alicia Deeny
- Teaching staff: 134.40 FTE (2022-23)
- Grades: 9–12
- Enrollment: 2,390 (2022-23)
- Student to teacher ratio: 17.78
- Campus type: Urban
- Colors: Black and gold
- Mascot: Rockets
- Rival: Rockville High School
- Newspaper: The Tide
- Website: montgomeryschoolsmd.org/schools/rmhs/

Richard Montgomery High School (RMHS) is a public high school located in Rockville, Maryland. It is part of the Montgomery County Public Schools system. RMHS hosts the county's most competitive and far-reaching International Baccalaureate Diploma Programme.

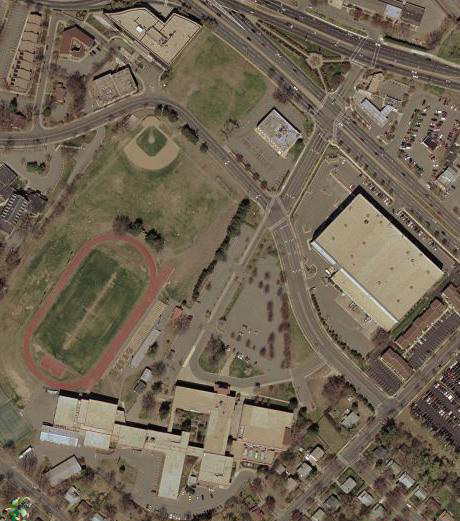
Aerial view in 2002

== History ==
=== 19th century ===
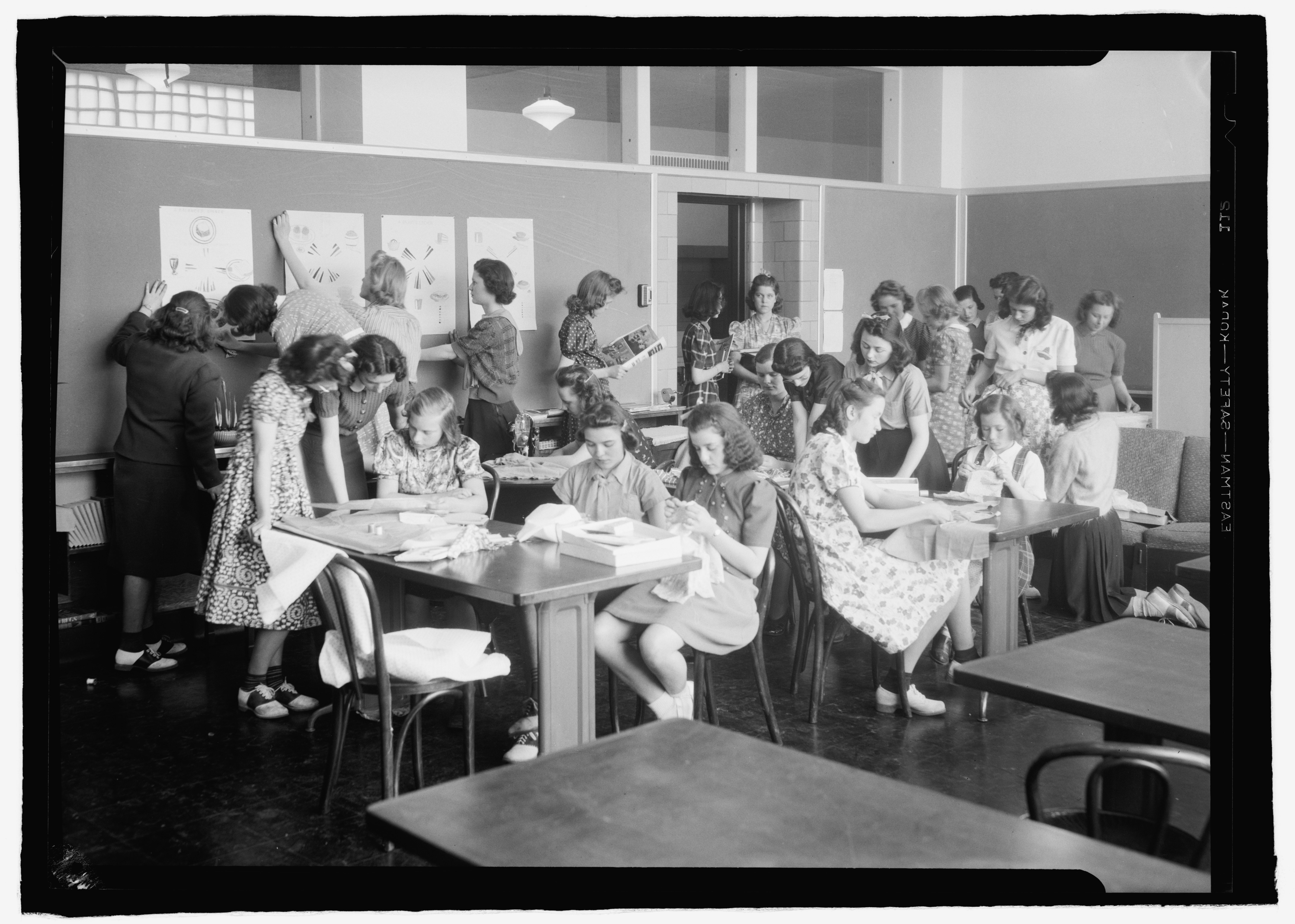
The school's class in 1936

Richard Montgomery High School is the oldest public high school in Montgomery County. It was first established in 1892 as "Rockville High School", when the state Board of Education first allocated funds to local school to educate high school students. The first class of twelve seniors graduated in 1897.

=== 20th century ===
A new high school was constructed and opened for use in September 1905 on East Montgomery Avenue and Monroe Street. An addition was built in 1917, expanding the school to 19 classrooms. Rockville Colored High School was opened in 1927. The school for white students was renamed Richard Montgomery High School (after a Major General Richard Montgomery, who had been a slave holder) to distinguish between the two in 1935.

In 1940, after a fire destroyed the old high school building, it was rebuilt on the current site in 1942. Additions to the school were made in 1952, 1959, 1964, 1969, 1975, 1976, and 1988. After the 1988 additions, the campus was 26.2 acres (106,000 m²) in size.

=== 21st century ===
In April 2008, the Washington Post, the Montgomery County Gazette, and the Montgomery Sentinel, reported that the school's principal, Moreno Carrasco, had been running a private business on school time and was using materials that appeared to be plagiarized from a seminar that he had attended at school district expense. Carrasco went on extended sick leave.

During Carrasco's absence, the student newspaper, The Tide, requested that administrators approve publication of an article about the investigation into Carrasco's alleged ethics violations and business endeavors. Assistant Principal Veronica McCall denied permission for publication of the article, but was overridden by Community Superintendent Dr. Sherry Liebes after The Tide editors announced that they would go public with news of the denial. The article was finally published online on April 24, 2008.

On June 10, 2008, Montgomery County Public Schools announced that Carrasco had been named the new director of secondary leadership training. The announcement also stated that the allegations about Carrasco's involvement in private consulting were "thoroughly investigated" and "not substantiated".

On June 23, 2008, Nelson McLeod II was named the new principal of Richard Montgomery High School. He left the position in May 2014 due to a cardiac medical condition, and was replaced by Damon Monteleone in July 2014, who in turn was replaced by Alicia Deeny in August 2021.

In 2020, a petition was started to rename the school due to its namesake, Richard Montgomery, being a slave owner.

=== Campus ===
Richard Montgomery opened a new $71 million building following the end of students' 2007 winter break. The new building features wireless internet for the teachers which has since been opened to student access, LCD projectors in every classroom, dozens of Promethean interactive whiteboards and learner response devices, a modern auditorium, and a recording and TV studio.

The school has an artificial turf stadium next to tennis courts and a track.

== Areas Served ==
Richard Montgomery serves students living in Rockville and a small portion in Potomac. It feeds from one middle school and five elementary schools:

- Julius West Middle School
  - Beall Elementary School
  - College Gardens Elementary School
  - Ritchie Park Elementary School
  - Bayard Rustin Elementary School
  - Twinbrook Elementary School

=== Potential Future Boundary Changes ===
As of the 2023-24 school year, RMHS projects to be over-enrolled for the next 15 years with its current attendance zones. To address these concerns, along with overutilization among other nearby schools, the county is conducting a boundary study for the new Crown High School, which has an expected completion date of August 2027.

== Academics ==
The school houses Montgomery County's first International Baccalaureate Diploma Programme (IB). This competitive-entry magnet programme draws students from all over Montgomery County and has an IB diploma rate of 97%, the highest of its kind in the United States. The IB programme has an approximately 12.5% acceptance rate for incoming freshmen. Entry is based middle school transcripts, and a personal essay.

Incoming freshmen who have been accepted into the IB programme are first enrolled in a special two-year programme consisting of courses designed to prepare them for more rigorous IB courses they will take in their junior and senior years. This also serves as a continuation of the final two years of the Middle Years Programme (MYP). The first three years of the MYP programme are offered to all students who attend Julius West Middle School, which is the sole middle school that feeds into RM. The MYP curriculum stresses "life long learning," "critical thinking," and "responsible global citizenship." It is a five-year programme designed for students in grades 6–10, and all Richard Montgomery students participate regardless of whether they are in the IB programme or whether they participated in middle school. Upon completion, non-IB students can apply to enroll in the IB programme. Students are accepted each year through this secondary application process for the IB programme.

In 2007, Richard Montgomery was featured in Newsweek magazine as the 27th highest-rated high school in the nation. In June 2002, it won its first award in National Scholastic Championship at George Washington University. Richard Montgomery High School won the 2003 Blue Ribbon in Education Award by the United States Department of Education. RM has been identified as the number one school in the D.C. metropolitan area in the Challenge Index for Rigor. Richard Montgomery has also had multiple Marian Greenblatt Education Fund award winner teachers.

As of 2024, Richard Montgomery is the 6th-ranked high school in Maryland and the 394th-ranked nationwide, according to U.S News and World Report.

Richard Montgomery students average a score of 1236 on the SAT, averaging 621 on the verbal section and 615 on the math section.

== Activities ==
Richard Montgomery has a student newspaper, The Tide, and a student literary magazine, Fine Lines. The Tide received First Place with Special Merit from the America Scholastic Press Association in 2013. Fine Lines has received various Gold Crown Awards from the Columbia Scholastic Press Association, including in 2003.

Richard Montgomery's quizbowl team (known as It's Academic) won the National Scholastics Championship in 2002. In 2006, they won the NAQT High School National Championship Tournament in Chicago.

Richard Montgomery's International Space Settlement Design Competition team won the 2008 cycle in Houston, Texas.

The Richard Montgomery Mock Trial team is the school's most decorated varsity team. Under longtime coach Daniel Evans, who retired in 2024, the team won twenty-six Montgomery County championships, reached fifteen statewide Final Fours, appeared in ten state finals, and won five state championships, most recently in 2019 and 2023. The team's margin of victory in the 2019 championship was the largest in state history.

=== Music ensembles ===
Ensembles such as the Madrigals, a chamber choir, and the Jazz Band often travel off campus to perform at various venues. The Philharmonic/Chamber ensemble is the highest ranking orchestra in the school. The marching band, the Marching Rockets, is also a part of football season.

== Notable alumni ==
- Will Allen, former professional basketball player, urban farmer entrepreneur, and MacArthur Award winner
- Tori Amos, singer
- Norman Bellingham, Olympic athlete
- Wolfgang Bodison, actor
- Gordy Coleman, Major League Baseball (MLB) first baseman
- Mike Curtis, National Football League (NFL) linebacker
- Russell C. Davis, mayor of Jackson, Mississippi from 1969-1977
- Jerusalem Demsas, journalist
- Mahan Esfahani, harpsichordist
- Rhadi Ferguson, judo and MMA athlete
- Dan Fishback, singer-songwriter
- Julia Galef, writer and philosopher
- Kyra D. Gaunt, ethnomusicologist, TED Speaker
- Caroline Green and Gordon Green, figure skaters
- Marc Korman, state delegate
- Thuan Pham, former CTO of Uber
- Zachary Pincus-Roth, author
- Tuan Wreh, Liberian triple jumper
- Jim Riggleman, MLB manager
- Kurt Schork, journalist
- Joseph Takahashi, neurobiologist, member of the National Academy of Sciences
