= NASAT =

NASAT may refer to or be confused with:

- National All-Star Academic Tournament - a national high school all-star quiz bowl championship tournament in the United States
- NASA TV - television channel for the National Aeronautics and Space Administration, a US space exploration agency
- Naša TV - a television station in the Republic of Moldova
