= Academic Competition Federation =

Organization that runs a national championship for collegiate quiz bowl

The Academic Competition Federation (ACF) is an organization, founded as the Academic Competition Foundation in 1991, that runs a national championship for collegiate quiz bowl as well as other tournaments.

== History ==
During the mid-1980s, several schools began to prepare for College Bowl's regional and national tournaments by holding independent invitationals, during which players became unsatisfied with College Bowl's questions. Several scandals soon emerged, in which the 1988 College Bowl Regionals were found to have recycled nearly all of their questions from the 1982 College Bowl Regionals, independent tournaments were threatened with lawsuits from College Bowl, and the 1983 and 1985 College Bowl National Championship Tournaments were cancelled.

In response to these concerns, the University of Maryland and University of Tennessee stopped participating in College Bowl, followed a few years later by the Georgia Institute of Technology and a steadily increasing number schools.

In the fall of 1990, the then-coach of the University of Tennessee team Carol Guthrie joined with a few University of Maryland team members to found the Academic Competition Foundation. In 1991, they held the first ACF Nationals, which was won by the host Tennessee team over Georgia Tech. While departing from College Bowl's structure, the tournament initially included a few elements carried over from College Bowl games. Those elements were later removed. No ACF Nationals tournament was held in 1992, but, beginning in 1993, Regionals and Nationals tournaments were held every year. By 1996, ACF Nationals was attracting 40 teams, but after the 1997 Nationals, Carol Guthrie announced that she and co-founder Jim Dendy were each resigning, and that ACF would go defunct.

In 1996, a new company called National Academic Quiz Tournaments (1996) was formed. NAQT was more organized than ACF in several respects, yet also included College Bowl-like features in their questions. University of Virginia student Andrew Yaphe thus organized the Academic Competition Federation to continue running the Regional and National tournaments along with John Sheahan and David Hamilton. The 1999 Nationals saw the first presentation of the Dr. N. Gordon Carper Lifetime Achievement Award, which recognizes individuals "for meritorious services in sustaining and enriching collegiate academic competitions."

Following the rise to popularity of NAQT, the decline of College Bowl, and longstanding complaints about the difficulty of ACF, a decision was made in 2001 to focus on the accessibility of Academic Competition Federation tournaments. Despite those efforts, however, only sixteen teams attended ACF Nationals in 2001, and the future of the tournament seemed tenuous. Thus, a third, easier tournament, ACF Fall, was conceived by University of Kentucky player Kelly McKenzie, star player of the University of Kentucky team, and held in November 2001. This three-tournament lineup continued to 2009, then again from 2011 to 2019, with a fourth, intermediate difficulty, "ACF Winter" tournament held as part of the current circuit, as well as in 2009-10

== Format ==
An ACF game consists of twenty ten-point tossups with thirty-point bonuses, a format now widely used by various collegiate and high school quiz bowl tournaments.

The ACF finals format is unique in that it involves awarding a tournament title outright to a team which is two or more games ahead in the standings of the second-place team at the end of the tournament proper. If two teams are tied, a one-game winner-take-all final is played. An advantaged final of up to two games is played if the first-place team is exactly one game ahead of the second-place team.

== ACF Tournaments ==
=== Overview ===
ACF tournaments follow the packet submission model, where editors organize the writing project and teams submit questions which will be used in competition. Depending on the experience of the players on a given team, that team may need to submit questions that will either comprise the entirety of a 20-tossup, 20-bonus packet, or that will be combined by editors with the question submissions of one or more teams to produce a full packet.

=== ACF Fall ===
ACF Fall is intended to be an easy college tournament for new college players or players with limited high school quiz bowl experience. ACF fall is played concurrently each year throughout the United States and internationally in Canada and the United Kingdom. With over 200 teams participating across all sites, ACF fall is the most-widely played college set in a given year. ACF Fall follows the packet-submission model.

=== ACF Winter ===
In 2009 and 2010, ACF organized the ACF Winter tournament. The target difficulty for ACF Winter was that of a regular college tournament, i.e. more difficult than ACF Fall and easier than ACF Regionals. In February 2020, ACF announced that it will be releasing ACF Winter again for the 2020-2021 season onwards.

=== ACF Regionals ===
ACF Regionals is the regular-difficulty (more difficult that ACF Fall) college tournament by which teams may qualify for ACF Nationals. In 2020, there were 11 concurrent ACF Regionals tournaments in the United States, 2 in Canada, and one in the United Kingdom. ACF Regionals follows the packet-submission model.

=== ACF Nationals ===
ACF Nationals is the final ACF tournament each season, and it has been run for more than 25 years. With the 48 strongest teams in the United States, Canada, and United Kingdom competing together at a single tournament location, the questions at ACF Nationals are more difficult than those at ACF Regionals.

=== Past ACF Tournaments ===
==== Early Autumn Collegiate Novice ====
EACN was an ACF-sponsored collegiate novice tournament written and competed on from 2010 to 2013. With stricter eligibility requirements than ACF Fall, EACN was intended to be an introduction to collegiate quiz bowl for people who had not played previously.

== ACF Nationals results ==
Year	Host	Champion	Runner-up	UG champion	DII champion
1991	University of Tennessee	Tennessee A	Georgia Tech A	—N/a	—N/a
1993	University of Maryland	Chicago A	Maryland	—N/a	—N/a
1994	University of Maryland	Chicago A	Maryland A	—N/a	—N/a
1995	University of Tennessee	Harvard	Georgia Tech A	—N/a	—N/a
1996	University of Tennessee	Georgia Tech A	Maryland A	—N/a	—N/a
1997	University of Illinois	Virginia A	Chicago A	—N/a	—N/a
1998	University of Maryland	Virginia	Harvard A	—N/a	—N/a
1999	University of Chicago	Chicago A	Maryland	—N/a	—N/a
2000	University of Maryland	Chicago A	Illinois	—N/a	—N/a
2001	University of Michigan	Michigan A	Virginia	—N/a	—N/a
2002	George Washington University	Michigan A	Kentucky	—N/a	—N/a
2003	Georgia Institute of Technology	Berkeley	Michigan A	—N/a	—N/a
2004	University of Maryland	Chicago A	Berkeley	—N/a	—N/a
2005	Northwestern University	Michigan A	Chicago A	—N/a	—N/a
2006	University of Michigan	Texas A&M	Michigan	—N/a	—N/a
2007	Vanderbilt University	Chicago A	Brown	—N/a	—N/a
2008	Brandeis University	Chicago A	Brown	Minnesota	Minnesota
2009	Washington University in St. Louis	Chicago A	Brown	Minnesota A	Ike Jose (Note: The DII champion in 2009 was an individual student from Stow-Munroe Falls High School)
2010	University of Maryland	Stanford	Minnesota	Minnesota	State College (Note: The DII champion in 2010 and 2011 was a high school.)
2011	University of Pittsburgh	Yale	Minnesota	Michigan	State College
2012	University of Maryland	Yale A	Virginia A	Illinois	Haverford College
2013	Columbia University	Illinois A	Yale	Chicago B	Illinois B
2014	Columbia University	Virginia	Yale	Yale	North Carolina
2015	University of Michigan	Penn A	Chicago A	Stanford B	Northwestern
2016	University of Michigan	Michigan A	Chicago A	Maryland A	Oklahoma
2017	Columbia University	Maryland	Michigan	Berkeley A	MIT B
2018	Massachusetts Institute of Technology	Chicago A	Penn A	Berkeley A	Harvard B
2019	University of Pennsylvania	Columbia	Chicago A	Berkeley A	Harvard B
2021	Northwestern University	Florida	Columbia	Brown	Brown
2022	University of Minnesota	Georgia Tech A	Stanford	Yale	Minnesota B
2023	Massachusetts Institute of Technology	Georgia Tech A	Chicago A	Yale A	WUSTL B
2024	Duke University	Chicago A	WUSTL A	Cornell A	—N/a
2025	University of Maryland	Stanford	Chicago A	Waterloo A	Georgia Tech
2026	University of Maryland	Berkeley A	Indiana	Virginia Tech	—N/a
Source: Notes

== Carper Award recipients ==
Dr. N. Gordon Carper Lifetime Achievement Award was established in 1999 to honor individuals for meritorious services in sustaining and enriching collegiate academic competitions. The award is presented annually to a member of the quizbowl community who exhibits the kind of dedication to and long-term support of academic competitions as exemplified by career of Dr. Carper. Beginning in 2019, ACF empowered a committee of former Carper winners who are also ACF members to select a second winner.

- 1999: Dr. N. Gordon Carper, coach at Berry College
- 2000: Dr. Carol Guthrie, former coach at the University of Tennessee
- 2001: Dr. Robert Meredith, coach at the Georgia Institute of Technology
- 2002: Not presented
- 2003: Eric Hillemann, coach at Carleton College
- 2004: Don Windham, ACF co-founder and Gaius Stern, of the University of California, Berkeley
- 2005: Charlie Steinhice, coach at the University of Tennessee at Chattanooga
- 2006: R. Robert Hentzel, president of National Academic Quiz Tournaments
- 2007: Andrew Yaphe, player at the University of Chicago
- 2008: Chris Sewell, developer of the SQBS statistics program
- 2009: Ezequiel Berdichevsky, ACF editor
- 2010: Subash Maddipoti, former player at the University of Chicago and the University of Illinois
- 2011: Dr. Seth Teitler, former player at the University of Chicago and the University of California, Berkeley
- 2012: Jeff Hoppes, former player at Princeton University and the University of California, Berkeley
- 2013: Matt Weiner, tournament organizer and question set editor
- 2014: Dr. Susan Ferrari, former player at the University of Chicago
- 2015: Dr. Jerry Vinokurov, former player at the University of California, Berkeley and Brown University
- 2016: Andrew Hart, former player at the University of Minnesota
- 2017: Jonathan Magin, former player at the University of Maryland
- 2018: Mike Bentley, former player at the University of Maryland and the University of Washington
- 2019: Rob Carson, former player at the University of Minnesota; and Kelly McKenzie, former player at the University of Kentucky and creator of ACF Fall
- 2020: Alex Damisch, former player at Lawrence University; and Mike Sorice, former player at the University of Illinois
- 2021: Matt Bollinger, former player at the University of Virginia and current player at the Georgia Institute of Technology; and Jim Dendy, former player and coach at the Georgia Institute of Technology
- 2022: Matt Jackson, former player at Yale University and current player at the University of Chicago; and Chris Borglum, coach at Valencia College
- 2023: Dr. Edmund Dickinson, former player at the University of Oxford; and Joe Su, former player at McGill University
- 2024: Dr. John Lawrence, former player at Yale University and the University of Chicago; Raj Bahn, former player at Broward College and Washington University in St. Louis; and David Hamilton, former player at the University of Maryland
- 2025: Jordan Brownstein, former player at the University of Maryland; Kyle Haddad-Fonda, former player at Harvard University and the University of Oxford; and Selene Koo, former player at the University of Chicago
- 2026: Alejandro López-Lago, former player at Claremont Colleges and the University of Washington and developer of the MODAQ scorekeeping program; and Dan Goff, former player at the University of Maryland and Virginia Tech

== See also ==
- College Bowl
- National Academic Quiz Tournaments
