= National All-Star Academic Tournament =

The National All-Star Academic Tournament (NASAT) is a national quizbowl tournament for state-based high school all-star teams held every June by International Quiz Bowl Tournaments. The current reigning champion is Illinois.

== History ==
The tournament was founded in 2009 with an initial event date of June 12–13, 2010. Originally, it was designed as an alternative to other all-star academic competitions.

The tournament has been held at Vanderbilt University, the University of Maryland, Ohio State University, and the University of Kentucky.

From 2012 to 2018, The National History Bee and Bowl awarded the National Quizbowl Awards at NASAT.

On March 17, 2020, IQBT announced that the 2020 iteration of NASAT would be cancelled due to the COVID-19 pandemic.

== Qualification ==
All-star teams representing any U.S. state (or equivalents such as Washington, D.C., Guam and Canadian provinces, etc.) apply to IQBT for entry into the field and are selected based on team strength.

== Format ==
Teams typically play in a round-robin, with additional playoff rounds being held depending on the number of teams attending. Games are played in a tossup/bonus format.

== List of champions ==
Year	Host	Champion	Second	Third	Results
2010	Vanderbilt University	Pennsylvania	South Carolina	Illinois	
2011	University of Maryland	Texas	Illinois	Ohio	
2012	Ohio State University	California	Illinois	New York	
2013	Ohio State University	Missouri	Texas	California	
2014	Ohio State University	Texas	Illinois	California	
2015	Ohio State University	California	Virginia	Illinois	
2016	University of Kentucky	Illinois	California	Ohio A	
2017	University of Kentucky	Illinois A	New York	Texas A	
2018	University of Kentucky	Illinois A	Virginia A	California A	
2019	University of Kentucky	Illinois A	Ohio A	Texas	
2020	N/A	N/A	N/A	N/A	
2021	Online	Illinois Blue	Georgia	Ohio	
2022	Online	New Jersey A	Illinois Blue	Missouri A	
2023	Online	Illinois Blue	California	Illinois White	
2024	Online	Missouri A	Maryland	Illinois Cyan	
2025	Virginia Commonwealth University	Illinois Blue	Maryland Black	Missouri A	
2026	Virginia Commonwealth University	Illinois Blue	Massachusetts	Maryland Gold	
