= Westling =

Westling is a surname. Notable people with the surname include:

- Dominica Westling (born 1984), Swedish actress and model
- Daniel Westling (1973), Prince of Sweden, Duke of Västergötland, husband of Crown Princess Victoria of Sweden
- Georg Westling (1879–1930), Finnish sailor
- Jon Westling (1942–2021), American educator
- Lester L. Westling Jr. (1930-2019), American Episcopal priest, U.S. Navy chaplain, and author
- Mikael Westling (born 1964), Swedish ice hockey player
- Nathan Westling (born 1996), American fashion model
- Roger Westling (born 1961), Swedish biathlete
