= Thuan Pham =

Vietnamese-American engineer

- Born: 1966 or 1967 (age 59–60); Saigon, South Vietnam
- Education: MIT (BS, 1990), (MS, 1991)
- Occupations: Chief Technology Officer (CTO), Uber (2013-2020), Coupang (2020-2022), Faire (2024-Present)

Thuan Q. Pham is a Vietnamese-American engineer, former chief technology officer (CTO) of Coupang and Uber, and current CTO of Faire.

== Early life ==
Pham was born in Vietnam. In 1979, at about age 12, Pham, his mother, and younger brother immigrated as Vietnamese boat people to Malaysia, where they were turned away as refugees after being twice-robbed by Thai pirates. They traveled on another boat to Indonesia, where they spent 10 months in a refugee camp. His life as a refugee included swimming to another town to buy candy for his mother to resell to the refugee colony for early entrepreneurial profit. Pham's family was granted political asylum in the United States because of his father and settled in Rockville, Maryland. His mother, an accountant in Vietnam, could not transfer her accountant certification and worked two jobs (one during the day, another at night), while he worked on the weekends. His father was a South Vietnamese Army soldier and teacher, who stayed in Saigon.

Pham graduated from Richard Montgomery High School in 1986, and the Massachusetts Institute of Technology with a BS in computer science in 1990, and MS degree in 1991.

== Career ==
Pham worked at Hewlett-Packard for three years, then Silicon Graphics. He was the fourth engineer at Internet ad serving startup NetGravity, and then joined DoubleClick after their acquisition of NetGravity in 1999. He then worked at VMware for eight years.

=== Uber (2013-2020) ===
In 2013, he was personally hired as the Uber Chief Technology Officer (CTO) by the CEO, Travis Kalanick, who was impressed by his technical skills after interviewing him for 30 hours over two weeks. In 2016, Pham's internal email to employees commenting, "I will not even utter the name of this deplorable person because I do not accept him as my leader" on the election of U.S. President Trump, who is anti immigration, was widely circulated and published by the media.

In 2017, it was falsely reported that Pham had knowledge of Susan Fowler's sexual harassment allegation at Uber and her manager's threatened retaliation, and did nothing. These allegations were later shown to be false by follow-up investigative reports and by a Buzzfeed publication of an email from Pham to the engineering team to clarify the matter. In the same week, Pham stopped working alongside Uber's SVP of Engineering Amit Singhal, who was asked by the CEO, Kalanick, to resign after a month for failing to disclose a sexual harassment claim during Singhal's 15 years as VP of Google Search, after Recode reported about it in media.

==== Resignation ====
On April 24, 2020, an SEC filing indicated that Thuan Pham will be resigning as of May 2020.

=== Faire ===
On June 13, 2024, it was announced that Pham would join Faire as CTO, replacing Marcelo Cortes who stepped down as Chief Architect.

== Personal life ==
Pham is a naturalized citizen of the United States. In 2016, he was listed among the "2016 Great Immigrants Honorees: The Pride of America" by the Carnegie Corporation of New York. Pham enjoys playing tennis in his personal life.
