= Commissioner's Academic Challenge =

Academic Competition in Florida

- Logo of the Commissioner's Academic Challenge
- Venue: Loews Royal Pacific Resort
- Location: Orlando, Florida
- Date: 1986 - Present (40 years)
- Organizing body: Florida Department of Education & Polk County Public Schools
- Teams: 30
- Website: https://academic-challenge.org/

Champion
- Pinellas (8th win)

The Commissioner's Academic Challenge (CAC) is Florida's statewide high school quiz bowl-like academic tournament. The tournament is held at the Loews Royal Pacific Resort in Orlando, Florida, during March or April. It was cancelled in 2020 due to COVID-19.

The tournament is run by the Florida Department of Education Polk County Public Schools. Each county school board in Florida is asked to send a team composed of six high school students. Participating counties are separated into three divisions based on their full-time enrollment numbers for grades 9-12.

== Tournament Format ==
Only four players may compete during a given round, but coaches are allowed to make substitutions between rounds. Most matches feature somewhere between four and six teams competing at the same time. A panel of judges is present in each competition room to deliberate if a challenge is declared by a team.

Teams compete in up to four untimed matches, around 2 hours each, with matches consisting of 3 rounds, each with 5, 10, and 15 point "button" question rounds of 20, 20, and 25 questions respectively. Additionally, each round has a 10, 20, and 30 team question respectively. Button questions are quick-response toss-ups, answered by only one team, with correct answers earning points and incorrect answers losing points. The Team Questions are written worksheets, completed by each team, and earn points for each correct answer, but do not lose points for incorrect answers.

The questions asked become progressively harder in each round and cover a variety of fields including English, math, science, social studies, art, music, foreign language (French and Spanish), technology, and multi-subject. The questions take a variety of forms, such as matching, multiple choice, fill-in-the-blank, and free response. Some questions, such as foreign language, music, art and physics are written and are distributed on handouts, simultaneously, to all participants. Others, such as music, are played as audio tracks, and some, such as foreign language are displayed as video tracks. CAC differs from most tournaments in that once a team has buzzed in, that question ends whether the team gave a right or wrong response.

== Awards and Prizes ==
At the conclusion of the tournament, the top three teams in each division receive rings from Herff Jones, while the championship and second place teams also receive trophies and medallions from the Florida High School Athletic Association.

In addition, one winning player from each of the three championship counties, and three other players selected "at large," are chosen to serve on Team Florida, which competes at the National Tournament of Academic Excellence in June.

== History of CAC ==
The tournament began in 1986 and changed names several times before settling on its present title in 1997. The following is a list of winning counties:

Year	Division I	Division II	Division III	Year	Division I	Division II	Division III
1986	Seminole	Suwannee	(No Division III)	2007	Polk	Leon	Hardee
1987	Orange	Highlands	(No Division III)	2008	Pinellas	Martin	Hardee
1988	Duval	Clay	Suwannee	2009	Brevard	Indian River	Jackson
1989	Polk	Bay	Suwannee	2010	Escambia	Santa Rosa	Franklin
1990	Pinellas	Highlands	Suwannee	2011*	Escambia	Leon	Suwannee
1991	Dade	Indian River	Suwannee	2012	Orange	Leon	Monroe
1992	Pinellas	Collier	Suwannee	2013	Pinellas	Martin	Suwannee
1993	Duval	St. Lucie	DeSoto	2014	Seminole	Okaloosa	Suwannee
1994	Pinellas	Bay	Suwannee	2015*	Orange	Okaloosa	Suwannee
1995	Broward	Clay	Suwannee	2016*	Manatee	Clay	Columbia
1996	Leon	Osceola	Suwannee	2017*	Pinellas	Martin	Walton
1997	Duval	Indian River	DeSoto	2018	Orange	Escambia	Hendry
1998	Seminole	Hernando	Suwannee	2019*	Orange	Leon	FAU
1999	Brevard	Indian River	DeSoto	2020*	Was not held		
2000	Escambia	Leon	Taylor	2021*	Was not held		
2001	Palm Beach	Indian River	Suwannee	2022	Brevard	Okaloosa	Walton
2002	Escambia	Leon	Suwannee	2023	Polk	Leon	Columbia
2003	Escambia	Leon	Suwannee	2024	Polk	Okaloosa	Columbia
2004	Brevard	St. Lucie	Hardee	2025	Pinellas	St. Lucie	Columbia
2005	Manatee	Okaloosa	Gadsden	2026	Pinellas	Okaloosa	Putnam
2006	Escambia	Santa Rosa	Hardee	2027	TBD	TBD	TBD

=== Teams by wins ===
Teams by number of wins
Team	Wins	Team	Wins
Suwannee	17	Bay	2
Leon	9	Manatee	2
Pinellas	8	Santa Rosa	2
Escambia	7	Walton	2
Okaloosa	6	Miami-Dade	1
Orange	5	Broward	1
Indian River	5	Collier	1
Polk	4	Hernando	1
Brevard	4	Taylor	1
Hardee	4	Palm Beach	1
Columbia	4	Osceola	1
Seminole	3	Franklin	1
Duval	3	Monroe	1
Clay	3	Hendry	1
St. Lucie	3	Gadsden	1
Martin	3	FAU	1
DeSoto	3	Putnam	1
Highlands	2		
