= Georgetown, McDonough County, Illinois =

Georgetown, Illinois
- Census-designated place
- Location within Illinois Location within the United States
- Coordinates: 40°27′40″N 90°43′05″W
- Country: United States
- State: Illinois
- County: McDonough
- Township: Emmet

Area
  - Total: 0.144 sq mi (0.37 km^{2})
  - Land: 0.144 sq mi (0.37 km^{2})
  - Water: 0 sq mi (0 km^{2})
- Elevation: 600 ft (180 m)

Population (2020)
  - Total: 368
  - Density: 2,560/sq mi (987/km^{2})
- Time zone: UTC-6 (Central (CST))
  - Summer (DST): UTC-5 (CDT)
- ZIP Code: 61455 (Macomb)
- Area code: 309
- GNIS feature ID: 2633173

Georgetown is an unincorporated community and census-designated place (CDP) in McDonough County, Illinois, United States. Its population was 368 as of the 2020 census.

The community is in central McDonough County, on the western border of the city of Macomb, the McDonough county seat. According to the U.S. Census Bureau, the Georgetown CDP has an area of 0.14 square miles (0.36 km^{2}), all land. The community is in the valley of the East Fork of the La Moine River.

Georgetown is part of Macomb Community Unit School District 185, and high schoolers go to Macomb High School.

== Education ==
It is in the Macomb Community Unit School District 185. The comprehensive high school is Macomb High School.
