= Partnership for Academic Competition Excellence =

Student quiz competition

- Abbreviation: PACE
- Formation: 1996
- Type: NGO
- Legal status: 501(c)(3) non-profit organization
- Purpose: Promotion of quiz bowl
- Services: National Scholastic Championship high school quiz bowl tournament
- Members: 50 members
- President: Mia McGill
- Website: www.pace-nsc.org

The Partnership for Academic Competition Excellence (PACE) is a United States–based 501(c)(3) non-profit organization that promotes high school quiz bowl and runs the National Scholastic Championship (NSC), an end-of-year national tournament for high school quiz bowl teams. PACE was founded in 1996 by a group of quiz bowl players and coaches who were dissatisfied with the quality of high school quiz bowl at the time. The NSC has been run in the June of every year since 1998. Beyond running the NSC, PACE offers advice and staff assistance to high schools and colleges who run high school quiz bowl tournaments. PACE does not currently supply questions for regular season tournaments or offer a collegiate competition program, unlike NAQT or Questions Unlimited.

In addition to running a national tournament, PACE awards the Benjamin Cooper Academic Ambassador Award each year at the opening ceremony of the NSC. The award is chosen by PACE members to honor "a high school academic competition team member, advisor, or organization whose character best promotes the spirit and honor of quiz bowl competition". It is named for Ben Cooper, who, as the captain of the It's Academic quiz bowl team at Georgetown Day School, worked with the PACE founders to provide a player's perspective on the plans for the inaugural NSC. Ben Cooper died in an automobile accident just before the start of his senior year. In 2004, PACE expanded its recognition program to include a "Young Ambassador" Award to recognize individuals or recent alumni from high school or college quiz bowl programs for "valuable and significant contributions to the high school academic competition community".

== National Scholastic Championship ==
PACE runs the National Scholastic Championship, a tournament for high school quiz bowl teams. Teams that attend the PACE NSC are mainly from schools in the United States, with teams from Canada and Singapore having also attended. Teams qualify by placing well at a PACE-certified tournament. There are three levels of qualifier events, with higher levels allowing more teams to qualify from that event. A number of teams can also qualify via a wild card bid. There is no limit to the number of teams from a single school that can qualify or attend. In order to qualify multiple teams from one school, multiple teams must concurrently qualify at the same tournament.

On March 18, 2020, PACE announced that the 2020 NSC would be cancelled due to the 2019-20 coronavirus pandemic.

=== Format ===
The tournament takes place over two days during the weekend. On Saturday, teams are grouped into pools for preliminary rounds and play a round robin within that group, then are regrouped for playoff rounds based on their win–loss record in their preliminary group. On Sunday, teams are again regrouped into "superplayoff" brackets. Usually, a final will be played between the top two teams, though specific circumstances can make a final match unnecessary. Following the final rounds, an All-Star game featuring the top individual scorers is played and the closing ceremony is held.

Each round consists of two halves of ten tossups and ten bonuses. Tossups are worth 10 points for a correct answer, though 20 points may be awarded if they are answered early. Teams are not penalized for incorrect answers. Bouncebacks were allowed for bonuses until 2023. In the event of a tie, a sudden death tossup is read.

From 1998 to 2009, the NSC used a slightly different gameplay format that was distinct from most other quiz bowl tournaments. The old format had three rounds with varying gameplay, the Related Tossup-Bonus round, the Category Quiz round, and the Stretch round.

=== NSC results and Cooper award recipients ===
Year	Location	Field size	Champion	Runner-up	Cooper Award	Young Ambassador Award
1998	Case Western Reserve University	29	State College Area High School	Henry Ford II High School	Sue Ikenberry, coach at Georgetown Day School in Washington, DC, on behalf of Ben Cooper	—N/a
1999	University of Pennsylvania	22	State College Area High School (2)	Rockville High School	Joe Hermiller, coach at E.L. Bowsher High School	—N/a
2000	Furman University	16	State College Area High School (3)	Eisenhower High School	Rick Barry, James Garrick, and Hodges Lewis, operators of Academic Competition Enterprises	—N/a
2001	Bowling Green State University	22	State College Area High School (4)	Georgetown Day School	Robert C. Grierson, editor of Scholastic Visions, the newsletter of the Illinois High School Scholastic Bowl Coaches Association	—N/a
2002	The George Washington University	40	Richard Montgomery High School	Detroit Catholic Central High School	Douglas Tyson, coach at Benjamin Banneker Academic High School, and Sue Altman, producer of It's Academic, on behalf of the entire It's Academic program	—N/a
2003	Case Western Reserve University	27	Paul M. Dorman High School	Thomas Jefferson High School for Science and Technology	Carolyn Hawkins, coach at Cookeville High School	—N/a
2004	University of Maryland, College Park	40	Maggie L. Walker Governor's School for Government and International Studies	Thomas Jefferson High School for Science and Technology	Paul Cain, coach at Ysleta High School	Matt Weiner, Virginia Commonwealth University and David Bykowski, formerly of Furman University and University of Michigan
2005	Valencia Community College	31	Thomas Jefferson High School for Science and Technology (1)	State College Area High School	Sue Korosa, coach at Copley High School	Thomas Egan, coach at Maine South High School, formerly of the University of Illinois at Urbana–Champaign
2006	North Carolina School of Science and Mathematics	29	Raleigh Charter High School	Richard Montgomery High School	Bob Weiser, coach at Solon High School and Dr. John Barnes, coach at Maggie L. Walker Governor's School for Government and International Studies	Eric Grunden, coach at Raleigh Charter High School
2007	University of Michigan	36	Maggie L. Walker Governor's School for Government and International Studies (2)	Martin Luther King Magnet at Pearl High School	Julie Gittings, coach at State College Area High School	Evan Silberman, It's Academic co-captain at Thomas Jefferson High School for Science and Technology
2008	George Mason University	48	Walt Whitman High School	Thomas Jefferson High School for Science and Technology	Matt Knupp of Russell High School (Award revoked on February 25, 2009)	Lee Henry, coach at Brindlee Mountain High School, and Chris Sewell
2009	George Mason University	64	Charter School of Wilmington	State College Area High School	Eric Huff, coach for Paul M. Dorman High School	Christian Carter, player from Minneapolis South High School and webmaster of quizbowlpackets.com
2010	George Mason University	64	State College Area High School (5)	Maggie L. Walker Governor's School for Government and International Studies (Note: Southside High School was initially the runner-up, but, after evidence of cheating by one of their players was uncovered, their place was forfeited.)	R. Robert Hentzel, President of National Academic Quiz Tournaments (NAQT)	Sarah Angelo, player and tournament director at Maggie L. Walker Governor's School for Government and International Studies
2011	Northwestern University	60	State College Area High School (6)	Hunter College High School	Matt Weiner, Virginia Commonwealth University	Charlie Dees, Jeffrey Hill, Paul Nelson, and Christine Whelehon, on behalf of the Missouri Quizbowl Alliance
2012	Washington University in St. Louis	60	Hunter College High School	Bellarmine College Preparatory	David Riley, coach of Loyola Academy and Linda Greene, coach of Auburn High School	Lily Chen, player from Hunter College High School
2013	University of Maryland, College Park	72	Ladue Horton Watkins High School	Liberal Arts and Science Academy	Chris Chiego of University of California, San Diego and Dwight Wynne of University of California, Irvine	Max Schindler, player from Ladue Horton Watkins High School
2014	Reston, Virginia	96	Liberal Arts and Science Academy (1)	Western Albemarle High School	Jeff Hoppes of NAQT	Matt Bollinger, player from the University of Virginia
2015	Reston, Virginia	96	Detroit Catholic Central High School (1)	Liberal Arts and Science Academy	Joshua Rutsky, coach of Hoover High School	Nicholas Karas, player from the University of California, Berkeley
2016	Rosemont, Illinois	96	Liberal Arts and Science Academy (2)	Adlai E. Stevenson High School	Sheryl and Michael Cvijanovich of Matt's Buzzers	Ankit Aggarwal, player from the University of California, Berkeley
2017	Rosemont, Illinois	96	Detroit Catholic Central High School (2)	Westview High School	Fred Morlan, University of Kentucky	Jackie Wu, player from Downingtown High School East
2018	Reston, Virginia	96	Thomas Jefferson High School for Science and Technology (2)	Dublin Scioto High School	Chad Kubicek, National Academic Quiz Tournaments	Kady Hsu, player from Rancho Bernardo High School
2019	Reston, Virginia	96	Thomas Jefferson High School for Science and Technology (3)	James E. Taylor High School	Matt Albert, Justin Sharp, and Paul Villaluz, Las Vegas Quiz Bowl Alliance	Connor Mayers, player from Penn Manor High School
2020	Cancelled due to COVID-19 pandemic.	N/A	N/A	N/A	Chris Johnson, coach at Itawamba Agricultural High School	Ashish Kumbhardare, player from the Pennsylvania State University
2021	Virtual	80	Thomas Jefferson High School for Science and Technology (4)	Hunter College High School	Ben Herman, Greater Pennsylvania QuizBowl	Em Gunter, player from Salem High School
2022	Rosemont, Illinois	72	Lambert High School	Thomas Jefferson High School for Science and Technology	Kristin Strey, Scholastic Community Outreach Program	Kevin Kodama, player from the University of Washington
2023	Rosemont, Illinois	72	Barrington High School (1)	Thomas Jefferson High School for Science and Technology	Jay Winter, Iowa Quiz Bowl League and coach at Waukee Northwest High School	Joy An, player from Choate Rosemary Hall
2024	Reston, Virginia	72	Barrington High School (2)	Richard Montgomery High School	Tracey Hickman, Oklahoma Quiz Bowl Camp	Ben Weiner, player from University of Minnesota
2025	Rosemont, Illinois	84	Strake Jesuit College Preparatory	Lexington High School	Andrew Nadig, former player and developer of quizbowl software YellowFruit	Geoffrey Wu, player from Columbia University
2026	Rosemont, Illinois	72	Lexington High School	Adlai E. Stevenson High School	Greg Bossick, tournament organizer from Youngstown, Ohio	Andrew Gao, player from Belmont High School

== Other ventures ==
In March 2009, PACE organized the second annual "The Weekend of Quizbowl", a regular season invitational tournament at George Mason University that drew teams from across the United States. Part of the tournament ran on a custom question packets set that was also sold to other invitational tournaments. PACE did not run the tournament the following year. In 2014, PACE created an outreach fund to give monetary grants of up to US$200 to high school quiz bowl teams.

== See also ==
- NAQT
