= Lester L. Westling Jr. =

American Episcopal priest, retired U.S. Navy chaplain, Vietnam veteran, and author

Rev. Dr. Lester L. Westling Jr.
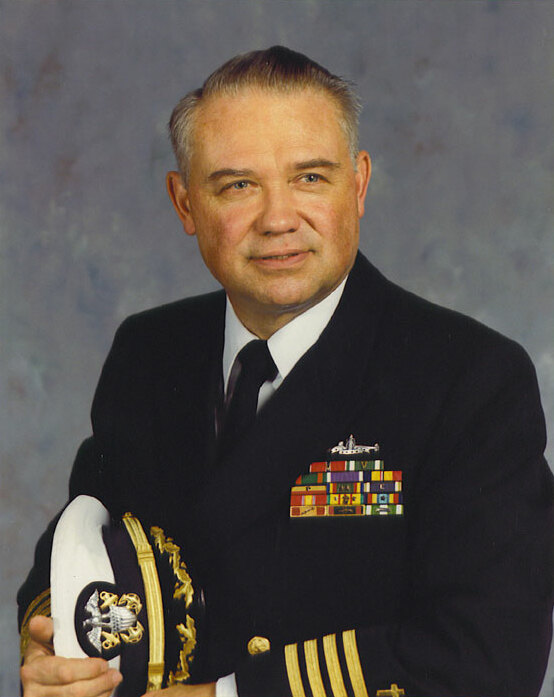
- Captain Lester Westing, Chaplain Corps, United States Navy (Retired)

Personal details
- Born: October 19, 1930 Oakland, California
- Died: May 2, 2019 (aged 88) Fairfield, California
- Resting place: Northern California Veterans Cemetery

Military service
- Branch/service: United States Navy
- Years of service: 1966–1987

Lester Leon "Wes" Westling Jr. (October 19, 1930 - May 2, 2019) was an American Episcopal priest, retired U.S. Navy chaplain, Vietnam veteran, and author. His more than fifty years of ministry have included service to parishes, missionary work in the Philippines, and twenty-six years as a navy chaplain, including two assignments in Vietnam: first with the Third Marine Division medical and infantry battalions, and later as a circuit riding chaplain for 65 combat units throughout the Mekong and Bassac Rivers and along the Cambodian border.

== Life and works ==
Westling was born in Oakland, California, and received his Bachelor of Arts degree from the University of the Pacific, Stockton, California, in 1952; Master of Divinity, Church Divinity School of the Pacific, Berkeley, California, 1955; Master of Arts (Pastoral Psychology), San Francisco Theological Seminary, San Anselmo, California, 1973; and Doctor of Ministry, San Francisco Theological Seminary, San Anselmo, California, 1974. In addition, he is a marriage and family therapist, licensed in California since 1975.

=== Ministry ===
After serving as lay vicar and seminarian intern at a number of locations in California, Westling was ordained Deacon June 13, 1955, in Bakersfield, California, to serve as curate at St. Peter's Parish in Redwood City, California, where he was ordained priest January 7, 1956. He became vicar of Good Shepherd Mission in (West) Berkeley, California, in 1957. Following this early work in the United States, in January 1960 he continued his ministry overseas in the Republic of the Philippines, serving as director of Easter School (Baguio) and St. Elizabeth's School (Benguet Mines) in addition to circuit riding a dozen outstation missions in the Mountain Provine of Luzon. In order to use his Chinese language, he was transferred as assistant priest at the Chinese St. Stephen's Parish and as assistant chaplain, then chaplain, to the 4,000 students at St. Stephen's High School, Manila. He was also the founding vicar of the Emmanuel Mission, Tondo, Manila. His work as a missionary in the Philippines spanned seven years, and, when he ultimately made the decision to serve as a navy chaplain, he was commissioned at the U.S. Embassy in Manila.

Following graduation from the U.S. Naval Chaplains School in 1966, he served on active duty as a navy chaplain for more than twenty years, including assignments with the 3rd Marine Division in the Republic of Vietnam, and as circuit riding chaplain attached to Naval Support Activity Saigon, visiting U.S. military personnel throughout the Mekong and Bassac rivers in Vietnam's Mekong Delta. At Naval Training Center San Diego, he established the Family Concern Unit, introducing family therapy to the sea services, which inspired the Family Service Centers in the Navy and Marine Corps several years later. He served as command chaplain to USS Proteus and Submarine Squadron 15 in Guam, to the eight ammunition ships of Service Squadron 3, and as command chaplain for the aircraft carrier USS Carl Vinson and Naval Hospital Oakland.

In the 2005 book, "Mobile Riverine Force," Westling is quoted as saying he covered so many units in Vietnam, from ships to small groups of men on ambush missions, that on one Christmas he held 18 Christmas Eve or Christmas Day worship services, and "almost that many Easter services." Some of Westling's experiences as a circuit riding chaplain would become part of training materials for future chaplains, documenting the way his work, far from chapels or military bases, allowed him to offer ministry even to military advisors who had never received "regular chaplain visitation" or support. Additionally, his work was recorded as an example of ways that chaplains, in addition to their primary role of supporting military personnel, could also become instrumental in civic actions that could build trust with local residents.

Throughout his career, Westling was recognized as someone strong in his own faith but dedicated to the work of helping those of other faiths grow stronger in those faiths. In the article, "Prayers That Hurt," Rabbi Arnold Resnicoff writes of his time as a Naval officer in Vietnam's Mekong Delta, crediting Westling as the chaplain who inspired him to "grow as a Jew," and then make the decision to become a rabbi.

After retirement from the Navy in 1987, Westling's ministry within the Episcopal Church included service as rector, All Saints' Parish, Redding, California; and priest in charge, St. Philip's Mission, Weaverville, California. A licensed marriage and family therapist, Westling served 1997–1998 as psychotherapist for the Tehama County Health Agency, in Red Bluff, California. In his 2006 book, "When Johnny/Joanie Comes Marching Home," Westling combines his knowledge of psychotherapy with his experiences as a chaplain, providing "invaluable insights for ministering to the emotional, relational, and spiritual needs that separations can cause."

In addition to writing about the need to help military personnel "reunite" with their families after extended deployments, Westling has worked to create partnerships between civilian houses of worship and military chaplains that can offer support for returning veterans, especially those who return from war. As Westling puts it, "When one has returned to the safety of one's homeland and family, the compassion and understanding of others ... heals and helps one leave the war behind."

=== Family ===
Westling married the former Marjorie Clark in 1958, and the two had three children.

== Awards ==
Among his many civilian awards are the 1985 Episcopal Church Presiding Bishop's Jubilee Award for Humanitarian Service (for civic action projects while serving on board aircraft carrier USS Carl Vinson in Africa and Asia during its 1983 and 1985 deployments); the "Paul Harris Fellow" award, Rotary Foundation of Rotary International in 1996; and the award of Senior Police Chaplain, presented in July 1991 for achievement by the International Conference of Police Chaplains.

His military awards include the Bronze Star (with Combat "V"), the Purple Heart, the Navy Commendation Medal (with Combat "V"), the Navy Achievement Medal, and the Combat Action Ribbon, in addition to numerous unit and campaign medals. He was also awarded the Submarine Deterrent Patrol Pin and the Combat Air Crew Wings.

== Writing ==
- "All That Glitters: Memoirs of a Minister," Hillwood Publishing Co; 2003, ISBN 0-9714100-2-X
- "When Johnnie/Joanie Comes Marching Home," Praxis Press, 2006, ISBN 978-0-9754305-9-0
- "After The Parade" Hillwood Publishing Co; 2014, ISBN 978-0-615-98507-7
- "Manual for Ministry to POW Returnees and their Families in the Long-Term Readjustment Period" Doctor of Ministry Dissertation (unpublished, but available from Naval Postgraduate School, Monterey and the San Francisco Theological Seminary, San Anselmo, California, libraries)
