= Quiz bowl =

Academic quiz-based competition

Quiz Bowl
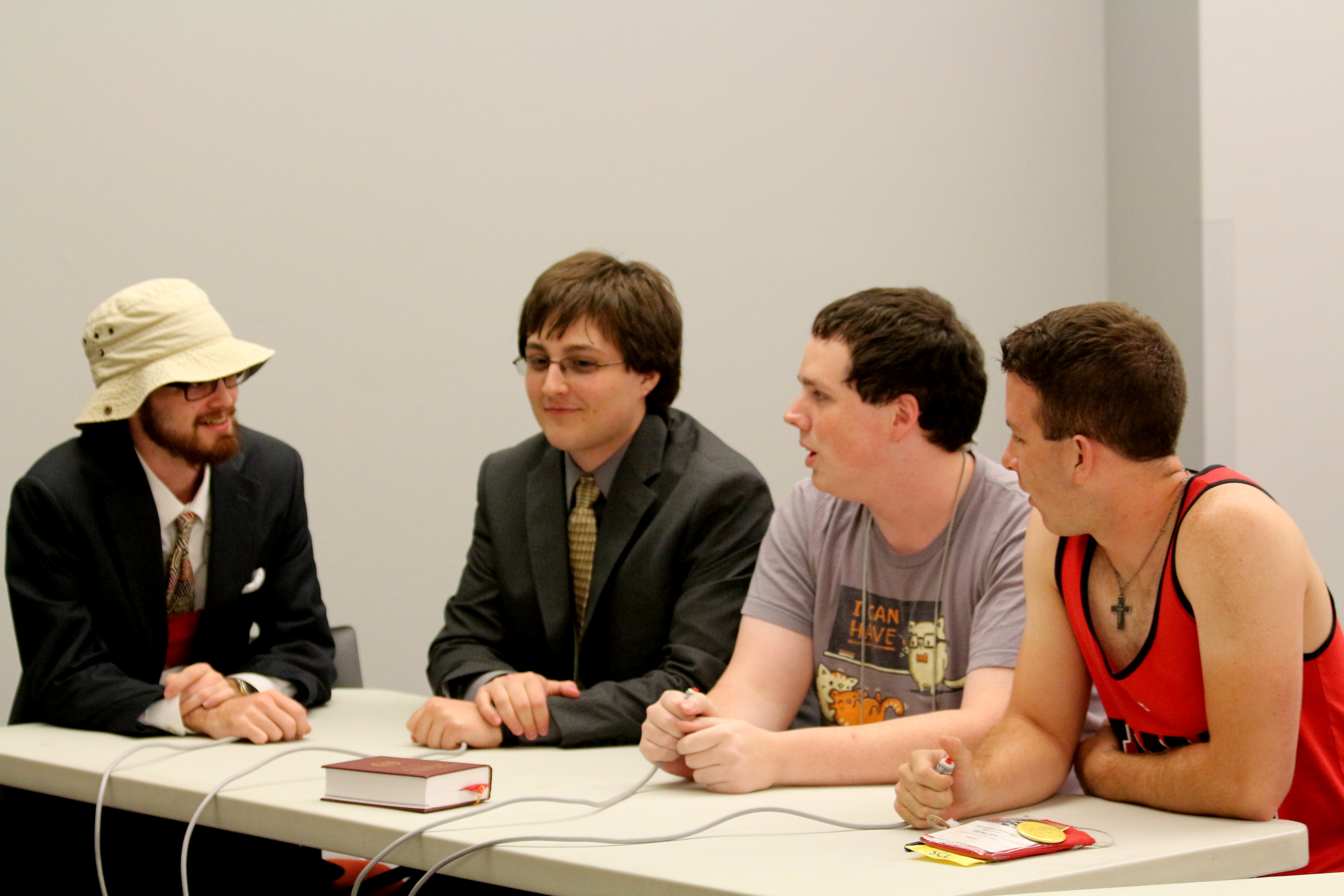
- A quiz bowl team at the Harvard Certamen, with buzzers
- Other names: Quizbowl, scholastic bowl, academic bowl, etc.
- Years active: c. 1953–present
- Genres: Quiz
- Players: 2–10
- Playing time: ~30 minutes (can vary)
- Age range: School-aged and up
- Skills: recall, knowledge, memory, reflex
- Materials required: Lockout buzzer system, questions

Quiz bowl (quizbowl, scholars' bowl, scholastic bowl, academic bowl, academic team, academic challenge, etc.) is a family of quiz-based competitions that test players on a wide variety of academic subjects. Standardized quiz bowl formats are played by primary school, middle school, high school, and university students throughout North America, Asia, Europe, Australia, and Africa.

Quiz bowl competitions are typically played with a lockout buzzer system between at least two teams, usually consisting of four players each. A moderator reads questions to the players, who try to score points for their team by buzzing first and responding with the correct answer.

Quiz bowl is most commonly played in a tossup/bonus format, which consists of a series of two different types of questions. Other formats, particularly in local competitions, may deviate from the above rules, with additions like lightning rounds or category choice.

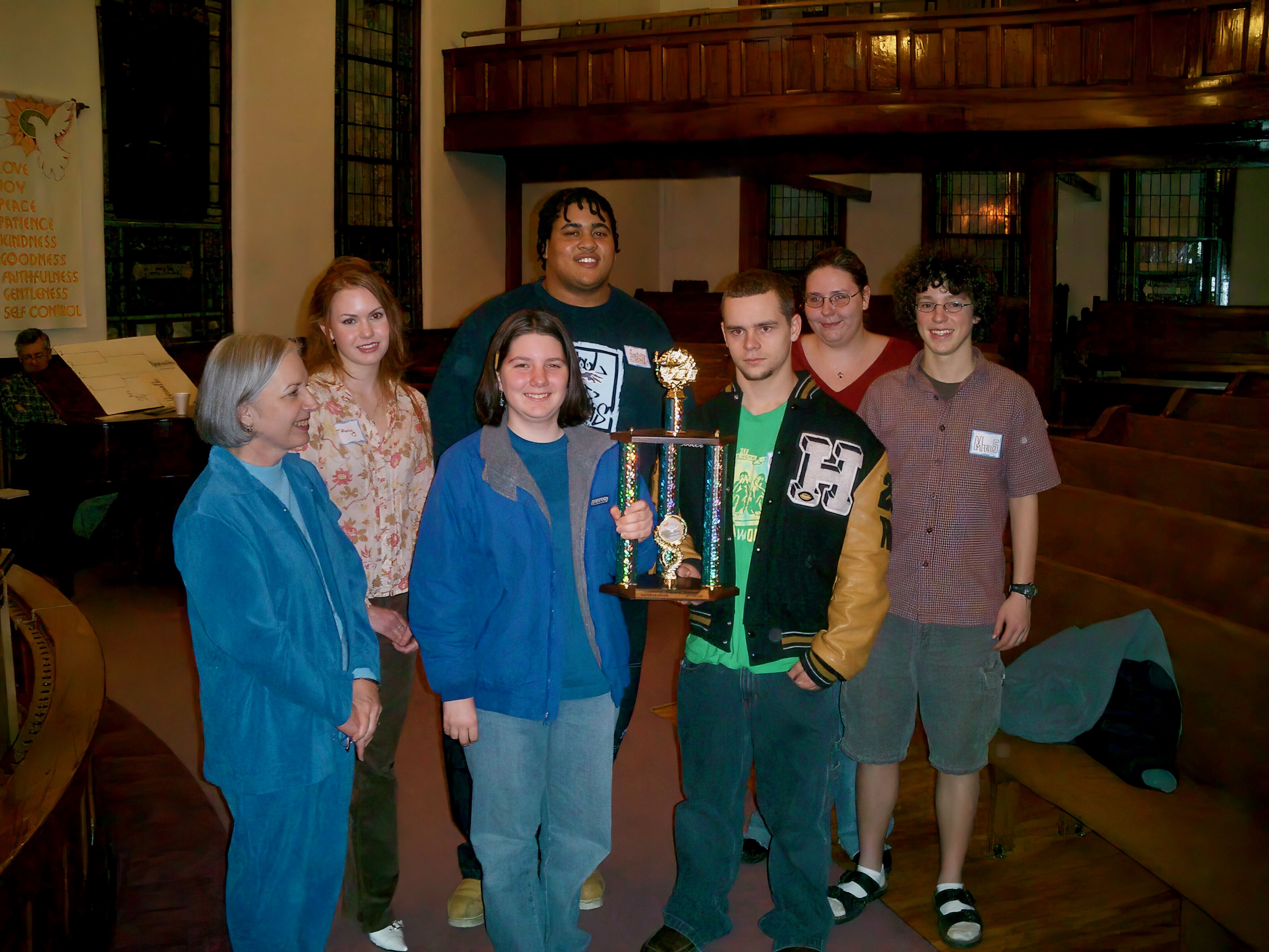
A public high school quiz bowl team after winning a local championship in North Carolina

== History ==
Most forms of modern quiz bowl are modeled after game shows. College Bowl, which was created by Don Reid as a USO activity for U.S. servicemen during World War II, was an influential early quiz bowl program. Also known as "The College Quiz Bowl," it started on radio in 1953 and then aired on national television in the U.S. from 1959 to 1970.

In the first half of the 20th century, many other quiz-bowl-like competitions were also created. Delco Hi-Q began in 1948 as a radio quiz competition sponsored by the Scott Paper Company for high school students in Delaware County, Pennsylvania. It claims to be the oldest continuously running student quiz contest in the United States. The It's Academic televised student quiz show program has been run for high school teams in the Washington, D.C., metropolitan area since 1961 and is recognized by the Guinness Book of World Records as the longest-running quiz program in television history. It's Academic has been spun off in many other U.S. media markets and has inspired many other televised high school competitions.

In 1977, College Bowl was revived as an activity on college campuses in the U.S. by College Bowl Company Inc. (CBCI). In September 1990, the Academic Competition Federation (ACF) was founded as the first major alternative to The College Bowl Company. National Academic Quiz Tournaments (NAQT) was founded in 1996 and currently organizes national competitions at all levels in the United States and supplies tournament questions for grade school and college teams across North America and other parts of the world. In 2008, the College Bowl program abruptly ended in the U.S., although the company itself continues to operate the Honda Campus All-Star Challenge (HCASC) for historically black colleges and universities.

== Gameplay ==
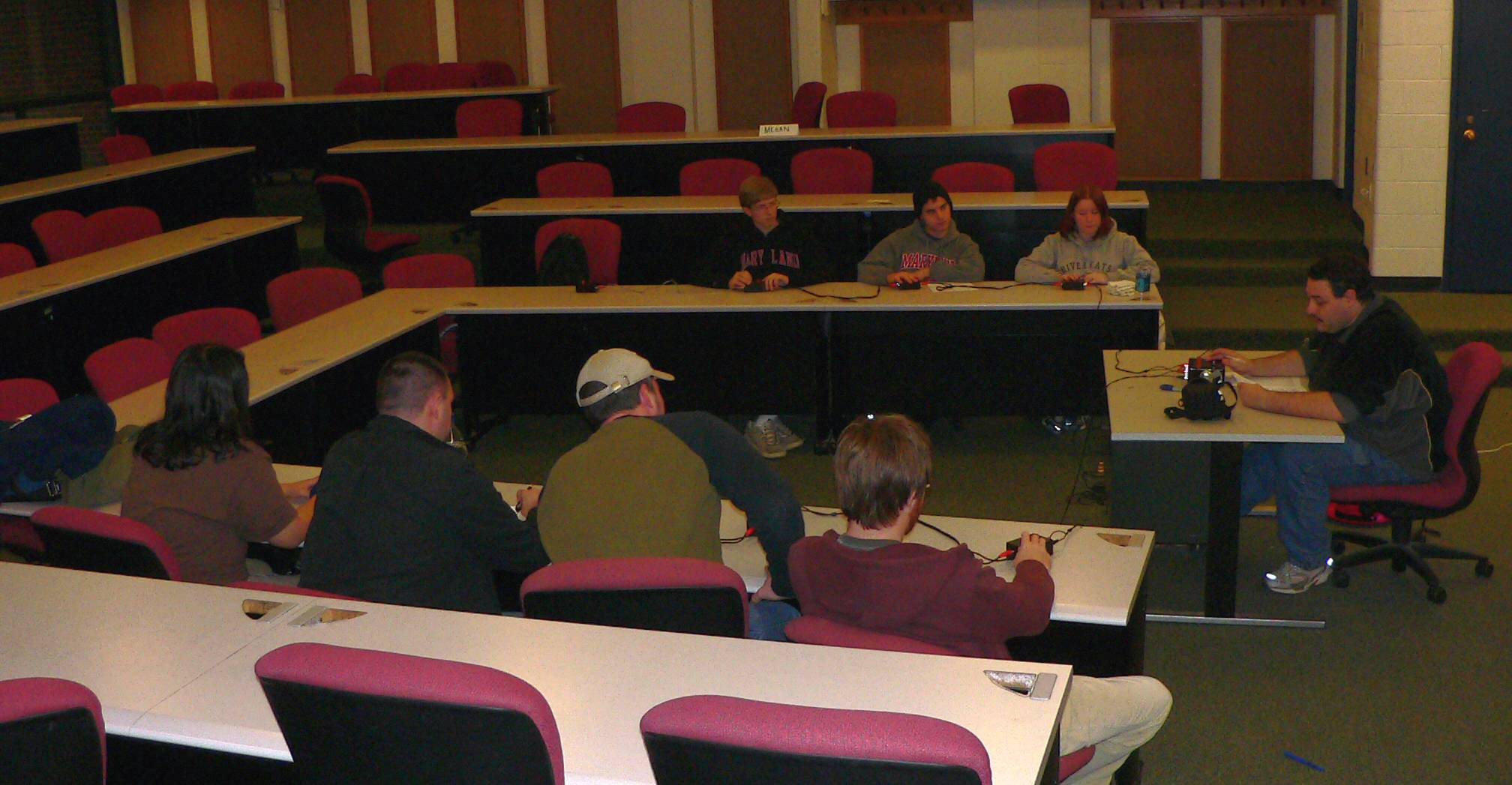
A quiz bowl game at the University of Delaware

During a quiz bowl game, two teams of usually up to four or five players are read questions by a moderator. When there are more than four players on a team, the team has to substitute its players for different games. Each player usually has an electronic buzzer to signal in ("buzz") at any time during the question to give an answer. In most forms of quiz bowl, there are two types of questions: tossups and bonuses. Tossups are questions that any individual player can attempt to answer by buzzing in, and players are generally not allowed to confer with each other before answering. If the answer given is incorrect, then no other member of that team may give an answer, and the moderator continues reading the question to the other team. If a tossup is successfully answered, the team who answered correctly is given an opportunity to answer a bonus question. Bonuses are usually worth a total of 30 points and consist of three individual questions worth ten points each. Team members are generally permitted to confer with each other before answering these questions.

Regional or local tournaments may dispose of any number of standard rules entirely. Some may only have tossups and not use bonuses at all, especially to prevent cheating at tournaments played online.

Some formats include a lightning round during which a team attempts to answer multiple questions as fast as possible under a given time limit, usually sixty seconds. Other formats include a written worksheet round, where teams work together for 2–5 minutes to agree on their written answers.

Match length is determined by either a game clock or the number of questions in a packet. In most formats, a game ends once the moderator has finished reading every question in a packet, usually 20. Tie-breaking procedures may include reading extra tossups until the tie is broken or sudden-death tossups.

Quiz bowl tests players in a variety of academic subjects including literature, science, history, and fine arts. Additionally, some quiz bowl events may feature small amounts of popular culture content like sports, popular music, and other non-academic general knowledge subjects, although their inclusion is generally kept to a minimum.

In most quiz bowl competitions, players and coaches may protest the moderator's decision if they believe their answer was incorrectly rejected, or an opponent's answer was incorrectly accepted. Invalid protests or unnecessary protests can result in additional loss of points or an expulsion from the game.

Timeouts may be called by a player or coach (if the coach is not reading tossups.) These temporarily pause the game and players and coaches can talk. These may differ from improvement, point check or categories that are coming up.

Substitutions may be done at halftime (tossup 10 or 12 depending on tossups in match) or at a team's timeout. These involve removing one or more of the four playing members on a team to switch with a waiting player. These are usually done if player's categories have been used up or if they are taking turns if there are many players on a team. These rules about timeouts and subs may vary from different rule sets but are generally accepted in NAQT matches.

Timed matches may also be in play. These are usually done by 9 minute halves and at the end of the first half, if not at tossup 12 or beyond it, the moderator will automatically skip to it. If past tossup 12 after the first half, they will just start where they ended. These often require players to stall or go faster. Skipping bonuses may be used if players are uncomfortable with the bonus but it will completely skip it and not just one part. These tactics are mostly accepted in different matches.

=== Tossups ===
A pyramidal tossup on Jorge Luis Borges

A short story by this author features the question, "In a riddle whose answer is chess, what is the only prohibited word?" A character in a story by this author describes knowing "the Secret," which is a "British artillery park on the Ancre". A story by this author features a hunt by the "Purifiers" through (*) infinite hexagonal rooms. Richard Madden kills sinologist Stephen Albert to signal the Germans in a story by this author. For 10 points, name this author whose Ficciones includes "The Library of Babel" and "The Garden of Forking Paths."
ANSWER: Jorge Luis Borges

— 2022 IQBT RSS #1

Two common types of tossups include buzzer-beaters and pyramidal tossups, with the latter being more common than the former. Buzzer-beaters (also known as speed checks or quick-recall questions) are relatively short, rarely being more than two sentences long, and contain few clues. This type of question is written specifically to test players' quick recall skills without discriminating between the different levels of knowledge on a topic that the players possess. Buzzer-beaters are not included in major state or national tournaments.

Pyramidal or pyramid-style tossups include multiple clues and are written so that each question starts with more difficult clues and moves toward easier clues. This way, players with the most knowledge of the subject have the best opportunity to answer first. Pyramidal tossups are considered standard for competitive quiz bowl, especially at the collegiate level.

In most formats, correctly answering a tossup earns a team 10 points. Extra points, usually for a total of 15 or 20 points, may be awarded if a question is answered prior to a certain clue-providing keyword in the question, usually marked by an asterisk, an action known as "powering." Buzzing in before the entire question has been read and answering incorrectly is called "negging" and may incur a 5-point penalty for a team. After a neg occurs, the moderator continues reading the rest of the question for the other team. There are usually no further penalties after one team has already negged.

=== Bonuses ===
A bonus question on amino acids

These biological monomers are usually in a zwitterionic form. For 10 points each:
[10] Name this class of molecules that make up proteins, examples of which include tryptophan, alanine, and lysine.
ANSWER: amino acids
[10] During translation, amino acids are polymerized by these complexes, which are formed in the nucleolus.
ANSWER: ribosomes
[10] Some proteins can become infectious agents. This is the name of those misfolded proteins that are responsible for mad cow disease and Kuru.
ANSWER: prions

— 2011 Collegiate Novice

Bonuses usually have multiple parts, related by a common thread but not necessarily related to the tossup that was answered. Bonuses are also typically introduced with a theme or fact that connects them before the questions themselves are read. A team is usually rewarded with 10 points for each correct answer in a bonus. Bonuses are the only types of questions that allow conferral among team members, with 5 seconds typically being given after the question to confer before an answer is required. Usually, only the team that answered the tossup correctly can answer the bonus, though some formats allow the opposing team to answer those parts of the bonus not correctly answered by the team that earned the bonus, a gameplay element known as a "bounceback" or "rebound." Less-used types of bonus questions include multiple-choice bonuses (sometimes seen in Science Bowl), list bonuses (which require answers from a given list), and "30-20-10" bonuses (which give small sets of clues for a single answer in order of decreasing difficulty, with more points being awarded for giving the correct answer on an earlier clue. The 30-20-10 bonus was officially banned from ACF in 2008 and NAQT in 2009. Most programs now use a bonus of easy, medium and hard but in different orders.

=== Variations ===
Several variations on the game of quiz bowl exist that affect question structure and content, rules of play, and round format. One standardized format is the pyramidal tossup/bonus format, which is used in NAQT and ACF (or mACF, referring to question sets produced in a similar style to those of ACF) competitions.

Most quiz bowl question producers, including ACF and NAQT, publish a distribution of the number of tossups and bonuses per round that will feature material from a given area of study.

ACF/mACF tossups are written in pyramidal style and are generally much longer than College Bowl and NAQT questions. Games are usually untimed and last until a total of 20 tossups are read. The published distribution of ACF quiz bowl emphasizes academic subjects, with very little popular culture. However, many "housewrites", or question sets written by schools themselves, may choose to modify the category distribution.

NAQT is another common variation on the tossup/bonus format that balances academic rigor with a wider variety of subjects, including popular culture and an increased amount of current events and geography content. Unlike many mACF events, most questions used in this format are written and sold by NAQT themselves. NAQT also uses "power marks" in their tossups, which reward players with 15 points instead of 10 for a tossup answered before a predetermined point. Games played on NAQT rules consist of two nine-minute halves and a total of 24 tossups. NAQT tossups are typically shorter than most other pyramidal tossups because of shorter character limits on its questions. The format used for the now-defunct College Bowl tournament uses comparatively shorter questions. Gameplay is relatively quick as it is played in eight-minute halves, to a usual total of 22–24 tossups read.

The Honda Campus All Star Challenge and University Challenge in the U.K. use similar formats.

Matches played at the National Academic Championship and its affiliated tournaments are split into four quarters, with differing styles of gameplay in each phase. Individual tournaments may use worksheet rounds, lightning rounds, or tossups without accompanying bonuses.

The 2020–2021 quiz bowl season saw a dramatic increase in the number of large online quiz bowl competitions due to the COVID-19 pandemic. In-person quiz bowl tournaments were cancelled, including all NAQT National Championships. Online competitions, often using the platforms Zoom or Discord, were widely used by tournament directors, including state championship organizers in 2020–21, as well as for the NAQT HSNCT and PACE NSC high school nationals tournaments. This allowed competition in spite of national and international lockdown requirements. These matches and tournaments were run in a similar manner to in-person competition, although some tournaments switched to tossup-only formats.

=== Preparation ===
Since questions are generally derived from an unofficial "canon" of topics, players commonly review, and practice with, questions from past competition to prepare for upcoming tournaments. Several websites exist for this purpose, the most commonly used being QB Reader, a single-player quiz bowl simulator that also includes a navigable database of past questions; Protobowl, a multiplayer real-time quiz bowl simulator; and QuizBug 2, a single-player quiz bowl simulator.

Players often research and write their own questions to prepare for quiz bowl. Active participation in academic coursework also helps to prepare for quiz bowl. Blind memorization of high-frequency out-of-context facts, often referred to as "stock" clues, is a common method of quiz bowl preparation, but is generally discouraged, because the memorization generally has little academic utility. Players benefit from exposure to a broad range of school, cultural subjects, memorization, and study skills, as well as an improved ability to cooperate and work in teams.

Some players swear by flashcarding (or just "carding") common answers and clues. This is often done through the use of spaced-repetition apps like Anki or Mnemosyne. In this way, players can quickly and efficiently memorize and retain the things that they learn during traditional methods of studying.

NAQT also sells lists of topics that are frequently asked about in their questions.

== Competitions ==
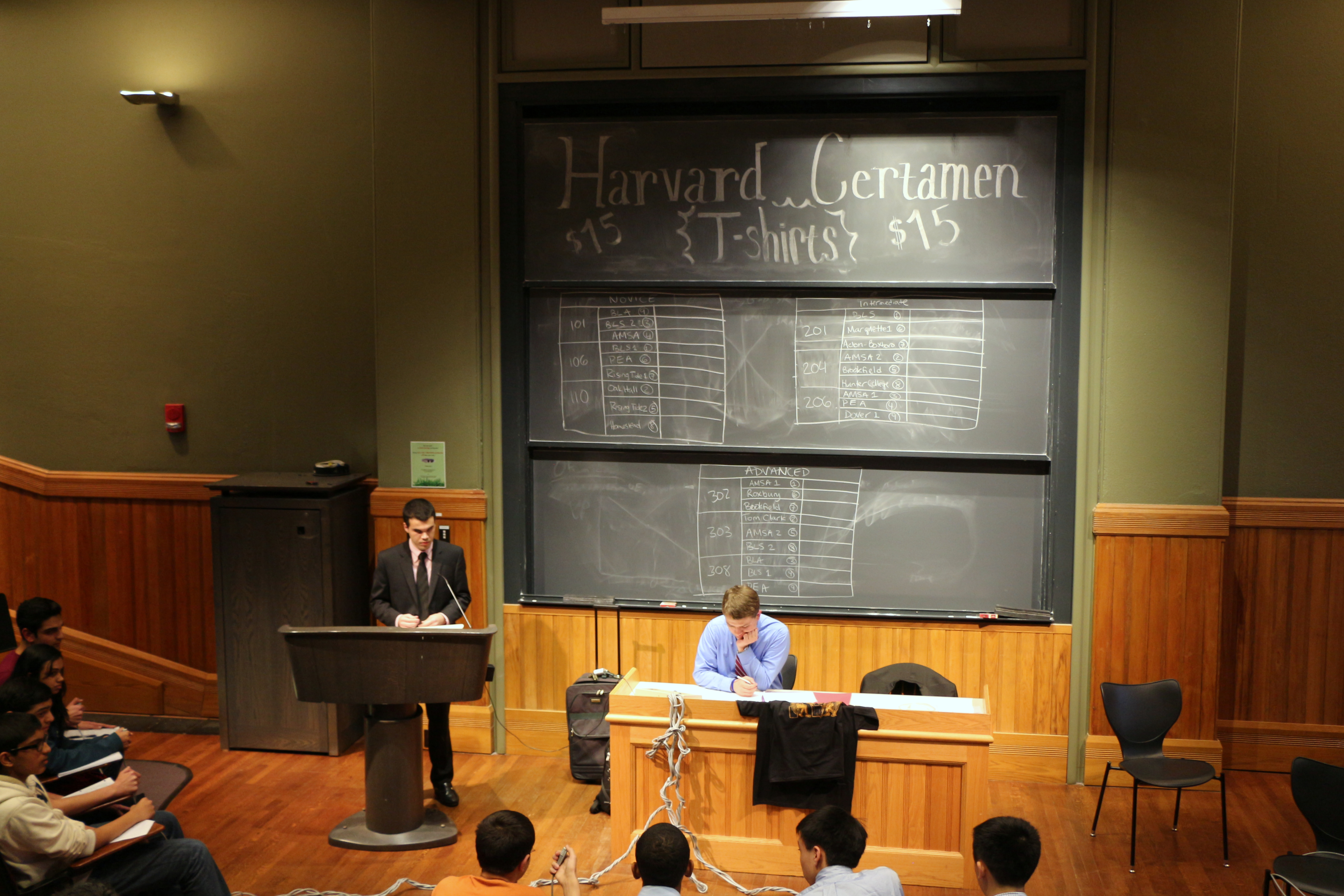
Scoreboard and host at the Harvard Certamen quiz bowl

Quiz bowl is primarily played at single-day tournaments. Some events have eligibility rules that dictate who may participate, such as allowing only freshman and sophomore players or excluding graduate students. Additionally, most tournaments allow multiple teams from a single school to compete.

Some schools hold intramural tournaments where any team formed from students can play. High school quiz bowl is often played over an extended period of time by schools within a local area or pre-existing athletic conference, or in single matches against other schools.

Some regional variants organized for grade school students include Knowledge Bowl, Ohio Academic Competition (OAC), Florida's Commissioner's Academic Challenge (CAC), and various television quiz competitions such as It's Academic. Athletic and activities associations in some US states also organize quiz bowl competitions, including Missouri's MSHSAA, Illinois's IHSA, Kansas's KSHSAA, Kentucky's Governor's Cup and Virginia's VHSL.

Additionally, various formats have been developed to test knowledge in specific areas like the Bible, classics, science, and agricultural science. DECA runs quiz bowl events at their competitions that tests knowledge on business and market topics. Gallaudet University sponsors a National Academic Bowl for deaf high school students. Tournaments designated as "trash" focus on pop culture and sports trivia questions.

=== National tournaments ===
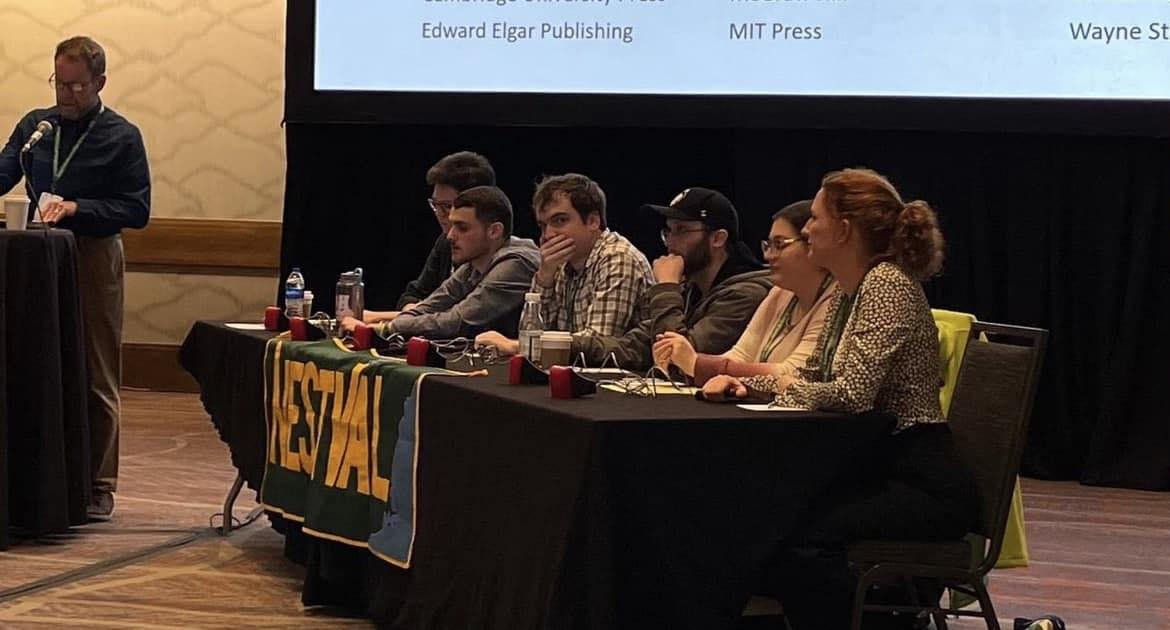
NESTVAL World Geography bowl team competing at the 2024 AAG annual conference.

There are several collegiate-level national championship tournaments, for which teams usually qualify through regional competitions. They include:

- NAQT's Intercollegiate Championship Tournament (ICT)
- NAQT's Community College Championship Tournament (CCCT)
- ACF Nationals
- Honda Campus All-Star Challenge (HCASC)
- The American Association of Geographers World Geography Bowl

Several national competitions are conducted in the United States every year for high school students. Compared to the college level, there are usually more tournaments that allow teams to qualify. National tournaments include:

- NAQT's High School National Championship Tournament (HSNCT)
- Partnership for Academic Competition Excellence's National Scholastic Championship (PACE NSC)
- The National Academic Association and Question Unlimited's National Academic Championship (NAC)
- JROTC Leadership and Academic Bowl (JLAB)

The following high school tournaments are for single all-star teams from each U.S. state or other political subdivision:

- National All-Star Academic Tournament (NASAT)
- National Tournament of Academic Excellence (NTAE) (formerly known as the Panasonic Academic Challenge)

There is also a tournament for middle school students:

- Middle School National Championship Tournament (MSNCT)

Beginning in 2018, NAQT has organized the Individual Player National Championship Tournament (IPNCT). Since 2019, IPNCT has been separated into high school and middle school divisions.

=== Educational value ===
Some proponents of reform seek to increase the educational value and fairness of quiz bowl, primarily by using pyramidal questions. Many competitions below the college level are criticized for their use of speed-check questions, which encourage participants to rely more on their ability to buzz in quickly than on knowledge of the subjects tested. Some tournaments, such as College Bowl, are criticized for being insufficiently academic, including using superfluous clues in their questions, and for recycling questions from previous years. The use of "hoses," misleading clues that discourage players from buzzing in too early, is also considered a mark of "bad" quiz bowl.

The use of mathematical computation problems in tossups is criticized by some for rewarding fast problem-solving skills over conceptual knowledge and for being non-pyramidal by nature.

== Broadcasting ==
Quiz bowl shows have been on television for many decades in some areas and usually feature competitors from local high schools. Many of these competitions may have rules and formats that differ slightly from standardized quiz bowl.

College Bowl was broadcast on NBC radio from 1953 to 1955. The program moved to television as General Electric College Bowl and was broadcast from 1959 to 1970, first on CBS and later on NBC. College Bowl would return to CBS radio from 1979 to 1982, and HCASC was broadcast on BET from 1990 to 1995. The Texaco Star National Academic Championship ran from 1989 to 1991 on Discovery Channel and was hosted by Chip Beall and Mark L. Walberg. In 1994, it was syndicated as the Star Challenge and hosted by Mark L. Walberg. University Challenge is licensed from CBCI by Granada TV Ltd. and still broadcast in the United Kingdom. Reach for the Top, a Canadian competition with a quiz bowl-like format, has been broadcast on the CBC in the past.

=== Game show contestants ===
Quiz bowl has received media coverage due to the number of highly successful game show contestants with backgrounds in the activity. NAQT maintains a list of current and former quiz bowl players at any level who have appeared on TV game shows. Several of the top dollar winners in the history of Jeopardy! include former players such as Ken Jennings, Matt Jackson, David Madden, and Brad Rutter. Such is the correlation between success on Jeopardy! and quiz bowl experience that Jennings described the competition as a "minor league" for the show and for other televised quiz show competitions.

== See also ==
- United States Academic Decathlon – an annual high school academic competition
- National Academic Quiz Tournaments – an American quiz bowl company
- National History Bee and Bowl – a history quiz competition in the US
- Reach for the Top and SchoolReach – a long-lasting Canadian high school competition, formerly nationally broadcast on the CBC
- Schools' Challenge – a U.K. high school tournament
- University Challenge – a British television quiz programme featuring university students
- Science Bowl – a U.S. high school and middle school tournament focused on science
- PACE – a U.S. non-profit organization best known for the PACE NSC tournament
- ACF – a U.S. organization that runs college quiz bowl tournaments
- Protmušis - a Lithuanian university quiz tournament

== Works cited ==
- Jennings, Ken (2006). Brainiac: Adventures in the Curious, Competitive, Compulsive World of Trivia Buffs, Villard, ISBN 978-1-4000-6445-8.
