= Early College at Guilford =

American public school in North Carolina

The Early College at Guilford
- The Early College Logo

Location
- 5608 West Friendly Avenue; Greensboro, North Carolina 27410; United States; 36°05′43″N 79°53′24″W

Information
- Type: Public high school
- Established: 2002 (24 years ago)
- CEEB code: 341594
- Principal: Alexander Wertz
- Staff: 8.50 (FTE)
- Grades: 9 - 12
- Enrollment: 192 (2024–2026)
- Student to teacher ratio: 222.59
- Schedule: 9:20 AM - 4:20 PM
- Colors: Maroon and black
- Mascot: Phoenix
- National ranking: #30 Overall #20 STEM (U.S. News)
- Website: ecatguilfordhs.gcsnc.com

The Early College at Guilford (ECG) is an early entrance high school located in Greensboro, North Carolina. The school was started in 2002 as a partnership between Guilford College and Guilford County Schools as the first early college high school in North Carolina, allowing students to graduate with a high school diploma and up to two years of college credit from Guilford College.

The cost of tuition for all Guilford College courses is covered by both Guilford County Schools and the state of North Carolina via funding through the Innovative Education Initiatives Act.

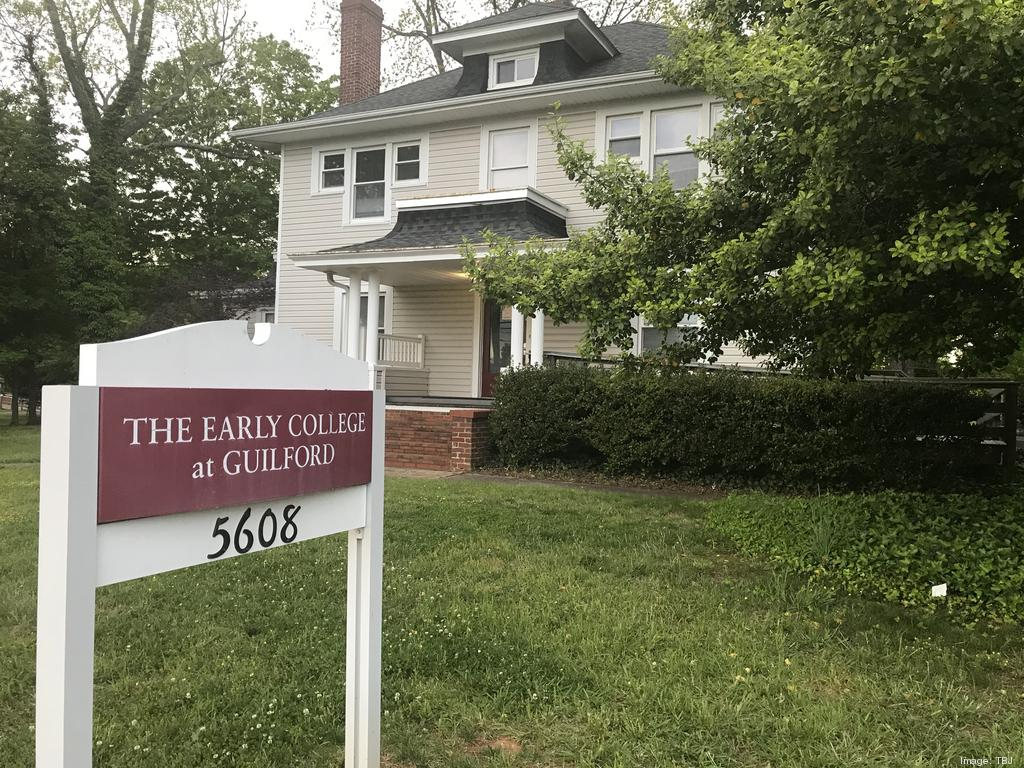
The George White house, location of the administrative offices of The Early College of Guilford on the Guilford College campus.

== Early history ==
The Early College at Guilford, opened in August 2002, was one of the first early colleges in the United States and the first in North Carolina. Representatives from Guilford College met with Terry Grier, the Superintendent of Guilford County Schools, in the winter and spring of 2002 to develop the early college program, which was modeled after the program between Bard College and New York City public schools. At the time, Bruce Stewart, the chairman of the Guilford College board of trustees noted, “If this can be a contribution of this Quaker institution to making sure that talented young people have access to good teaching and resources, I would want to support it enthusiastically.”

The founding class at ECG included 51 ninth graders, 40 tenth graders, 19 eleventh graders and 9 twelfth graders. The school was originally located in the basement of the Frank Science building but moved to modular classrooms in the fall of 2004. The first principal of ECG, Tony Lamair Burks II, provided students with the opportunity to control what happened with their education. He organized ECG to align with ECGs original mission statement: “To graduate confident, ethically responsible lifelong learners who are prepared to succeed in higher education and in the changing world beyond.” He noted that the Early College program “exposes the students to problem solving that can ease the transition into college. They will already know how to work through situations like approaching a professor or dealing with group sessions where one person decides not to do their work.”

The success of ECG paved the way for an expansion of early college programs in North Carolina. The state passed the Innovative Education Initiatives Act, in 2003, which provided the necessary start-up funds to cover the cost of college tuition, waivers for seat time and changes to the academic calendar. Between 2004 and 2010, North Carolina opened more than 70 early college high schools through collaborations between the North Carolina Department of Public Instruction, the University of North Carolina system and the North Carolina Community College system.

== Academics ==
Students at the Early College at Guilford follow a rigorous academic schedule throughout all four years. Underclassmen (freshmen and sophomores) take almost all honors, Pre-AP and AP classes required for graduation. Classes are taught on a modified block schedule with holidays that align with Guilford County Schools’ schedule. Most students say that sophomore year is the hardest with a very rigorous schedule. That year, students can take up to 7 AP courses in both semesters, with AP US History, AP Environmental Science, AP English Language and Composition as required courses and electives including AP Calculus AB, AP Calculus BC, AP Psychology, AP Macroeconomics and AP Statistics. Freshmen are required to take the PSAT while sophomores are required to take the PSAT, the Pre-ACT and the March SAT. The AP Exam pass rate in the 2025-2026 school year at the Early College at Guilford was 98%. Additionally, their AP participation rate as well as English proficiency was 100%. Lastly, their graduation rate was greater than 95% w

Upperclassmen are dually enrolled in both the Guilford County school system as juniors (and then seniors), and in Guilford College as freshmen (and then sophomores in their second year). Often, the number of AP Classes taken as underclassmen allows students to register as sophomores and juniors at Guilford College. Juniors and seniors take Guilford College classes, which count towards their remaining high school credits, and can often be transferred to other educational institutions. If a student remains at Guilford College after graduating from the Early College, the credits they received for their two final years will transfer towards their undergraduate requirements.

Students are not ranked at ECG in order to foster cooperation and collaboration among students and to allow students to focus on learning material. There is an unofficial class rank placed on the bottom of ECG students’ transcript. This rank is not taken into consideration for colleges and universities and is solely placed for informing the students, unlike traditional class ranks in high schools. Student GPA is calculated per North Carolina state guidelines on a standard 4 point scale with an extra 0.5 quality point given for honors and Pre-AP courses and an extra 1.0 quality point for AP or college courses.

=== Academic achievement ===
In 2025, the average SAT score was 1480 of 1600, the highest of all North Carolina public high schools. In 2022, the average SAT score was 1468 of 1600, again the highest of all North Carolina public high schools.

The Early College at Guilford was ranked #1 nationally by U.S. News & World Report in 2023; that year, it was also placed as the best public school in North Carolina and the #9 STEM school in the United States. In 2022, ECG was placed 35th in the nation by U.S. News & World Report and was ranked as the best public school in North Carolina and the #9 STEM school nationally.

Newsweek ranked the Early College at Guilford 7th on its annual list of the top 500 STEM High Schools in 2020. In 2010, Newsweek listed ECG as one of "The Nation's Most Elite Public High Schools". Newsweek also ranked ECG at 5th on its annual list of America's Best High Schools in 2016, making it the top high school in North Carolina that year.

Each year, about one-fourth of students at The Early College at Guilford are named as semi-finalists for the National Merit Scholarship. Scholarships and awards received by the Class of 2025 totaled more than $17,000,000 and in 2023 totaled nearly $12,000,000.

== Demographics ==
During the 2022–2023 school year, there were 199 students enrolled at ECG, approximately 50 in each grade. The students were 56% female and 44% male with 51% Asian American, 30% White, and 11% African American.

== Extracurricular activities ==
=== Extracurricular awards and recognition ===
The “Joe Childers Scholastic Cup,” sponsored by The North Carolina Association for Scholastic Activities (NCASA), is given each year to the “top large and small high school” in the state based on accumulating points in a set of scholastic competitions, including the seven NCASA competitions and eleven “Cup Partner” competitions. In 2023, ECG won the Joe Childers Cup for small high schools for the third year in a row. ECG was also recognized as state champions in eight categories, including The Twelve, A Cappella, Quiz Bowl, The Quill, Science Olympiad, Envirothon, HOSA and State Math competition. In 2022, ECG not only claimed the Joe Childers Cup for small high schools but was also announced as the state champion for Quiz Bowl, National History Day, The Twelve, and The Economics Challenge. ECG also claimed the Joe Childers Cup in 2021.

National History Day: First place state winners in the Senior individual website category. Two ECG teams qualified for the Small School National Tournament in 2022.

Quill: State champions in 2023, fourth place in 2021 and 2018, third place in 2020 and 2019 and second place in 2018.

Quiz Bowl: State champions in 2023, 2022, 2018, 2017 and 2016; fourth place in 2021.

Science Olympiad: Division C: Fifth place in North Carolina in 2023 and 2022; twelfth place in 2021.

The Economics Challenge: First place in 2022

The Twelve: State champions in 2022, 2021, 2018 and 2015. Third place in 2016 and fourth place in 2020-2021

== Principals ==
- Tony Lamair Burks II (2002–2006)
- Charles Blanchard (2006–2009)
- Bobby Hayes (2009–2014)
- Linda Kidd (2015–2018)
- Angela Polk-Jones (2019–2020)
- Pete Zachary Kashubara III (2020–2026)
- Alexander Wertz (2026–Current)
