= National History Bee and Bowl =

- Nickname: NHBB
- Status: Active
- Countries: United States, Singapore, France, Poland, Philippines, China, Canada, India
- Years active: 2010-present
- Founder: David Madden
- Most recent: April 2026
- Website: https://www.iacompetitions.com/

The National History Bee and Bowl (NHBB) is a middle and high school knowledge-based academic competition focused on history that is primarily held in the United States. It consists of the National History Bowl, a team event with a 4 quarter format, and the National History Bee, an individual competition featuring 35-45 question rounds.

== Rules ==
In the History Bowl, teams of up to 4 compete in a 4 quarter round against opposing teams. In the first quarter, 10 tossups with no bonus points are asked, with correct answers being worth 10 points. In the second quarter, 8 tossups are asked, being worth 10 points, with an additional 10 bonus points available to teams who answered a tossup correctly. In the third quarter, the "lightning round", teams are able to choose between 3-4 categories of knowledge, with the goal being to answer all 8 questions correctly in 60 seconds. In the 4th quarter, questions are power-marked, meaning they are worth more points the earlier a team gets a question. Teams are awarded 30 points for answering correctly in the first part of the question, 20 points for answering in the middle, and 10 points for answering towards the end. There are no negative points for answering incorrectly in any quarter.

In the History Bee, individuals compete in rooms of about 10 competitors, aiming to get to get 8 correct questions to "buzz out". In general, 40-50 competitors in each division with the highest preliminary scores advance to the quarterfinal or semifinal rounds. Additionally, those who advance to playoff rounds qualify for the International History Olympiad.
