= Student design competition =

Engineering competition

A student design competition is a specific form of a student competition relating to design. Design competitions can be technical or purely aesthetic. The objective of technical competitions is to introduce students to real-world engineering situations and to teach students project-management and fabrication techniques used in industry. Aesthetic competitions usually require art and design skills.

Both students and industry benefit from intercollegiate design competitions. Each competition allows students to apply the theories and information they have learning in the class room to real situations. Industry gains better prepared and more experienced engineers.

== History ==
Through the 1970s only one competition of significance existed: Mini Baja. Today, almost every field of engineering has several design competitions, which have extended from college down into high school (e.g., FIRST Robotics) and even younger grades (e.g., FIRST Lego League Challenge). The Society of Automotive Engineers organizes the largest design competitions, including Baja SAE, Sunryce, and Formula SAE.

== Notable design competitions ==
- Civil engineering
  - Great Northern Concrete Toboggan Race
  - Concrete canoe
  - Steel bridge
- Mechanical engineering
  - Baja SAE
  - Basic Utility Vehicle
  - Formula SAE
  - Human Powered Vehicle Challenge (HPVC)
  - ASABE International 1/4 Scale Tractor Student Design Competition
- Robotics Competitions
  - DARPA Grand Challenge
  - International Space Settlement Design Competition
  - NASA's Lunabotics Competition
  - RoboCup Soccer
- Multi-Disciplinary Competitions
  - Stanford Center on Longevity Design Challenge

== See also ==
- Student competition
- University of Patras Formula Student Team - UoP Racing Team
