= Antipode =

Antipode or Antipodes may refer to:

== Mathematics ==
- Antipodal point, the diametrically opposite point on a circle or n-sphere, also known as an antipode
- Antipode, the convolution inverse of the identity on a Hopf algebra

== Geography ==
- Antipodes, points on the Earth's surface that are diametrically opposed
- Antipodes Islands, inhospitable volcanic islands south of New Zealand
- The Antipodes, a principally British term for Australia and New Zealand (or more broadly the area known as Australasia), based on a rough proximity to the antipode of Britain

== Arts and media ==
- Antipode (journal), progressive social science general
- Antipodes (sculpture) by Jim Sanborn
- The Antipodes, a c. 1640 stage play by Richard Brome
- The Antipodes, a 2017 play by Annie Baker
- Antipodes, journal of the American Association for Australian Literary Studies
- Risley (circus act), a circus skill that involves juggling with one's feet while lying on one's back, also known as antipode

== Other uses ==
- Antipode or Abarimon, mythical creature with feet turned backwards
- Antipodes (submersible), a commercial submersible built in 1973
- Antipodes Water Company, a premium bottled water brand
- Enantiomer, a molecule that has a mirror image of itself, formerly known as antipode
- Antipode, a supersonic business aircraft concept by Charles Bombardier
- Antipodes, mental states described by Aldous Huxley in the essay "Heaven and Hell"

== See also ==
- Antipodean (disambiguation)
