= Baja SAE =

International student engineering competition

Baja SAE is a collegiate design series competition run by the Society of Automotive Engineers International (SAE International). Teams of students from universities all over the world design and build small off-road cars. The goal in Baja SAE is to design, build and race off-road vehicles that can withstand the harshest elements of rough terrain. The vehicles used in Baja SAE racing are often similar in appearance to dune buggies. Before 2007, the events were called "Mini Baja." The competition is not affiliated with the Baja 500 or Baja 1000 organized by SCORE International.

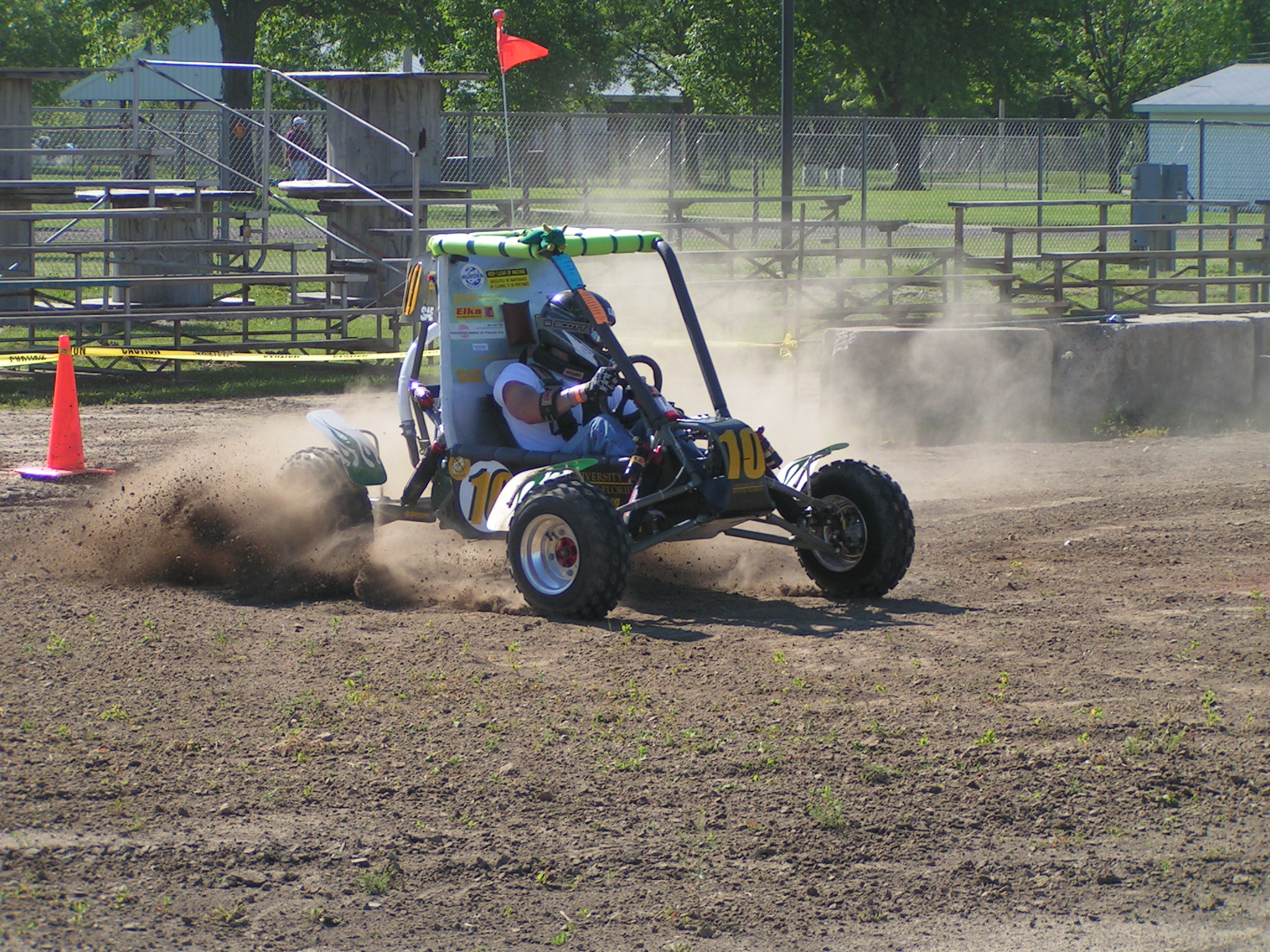
University of South Florida vehicle during the Mini Baja race from the 2004 Mid-West Competition

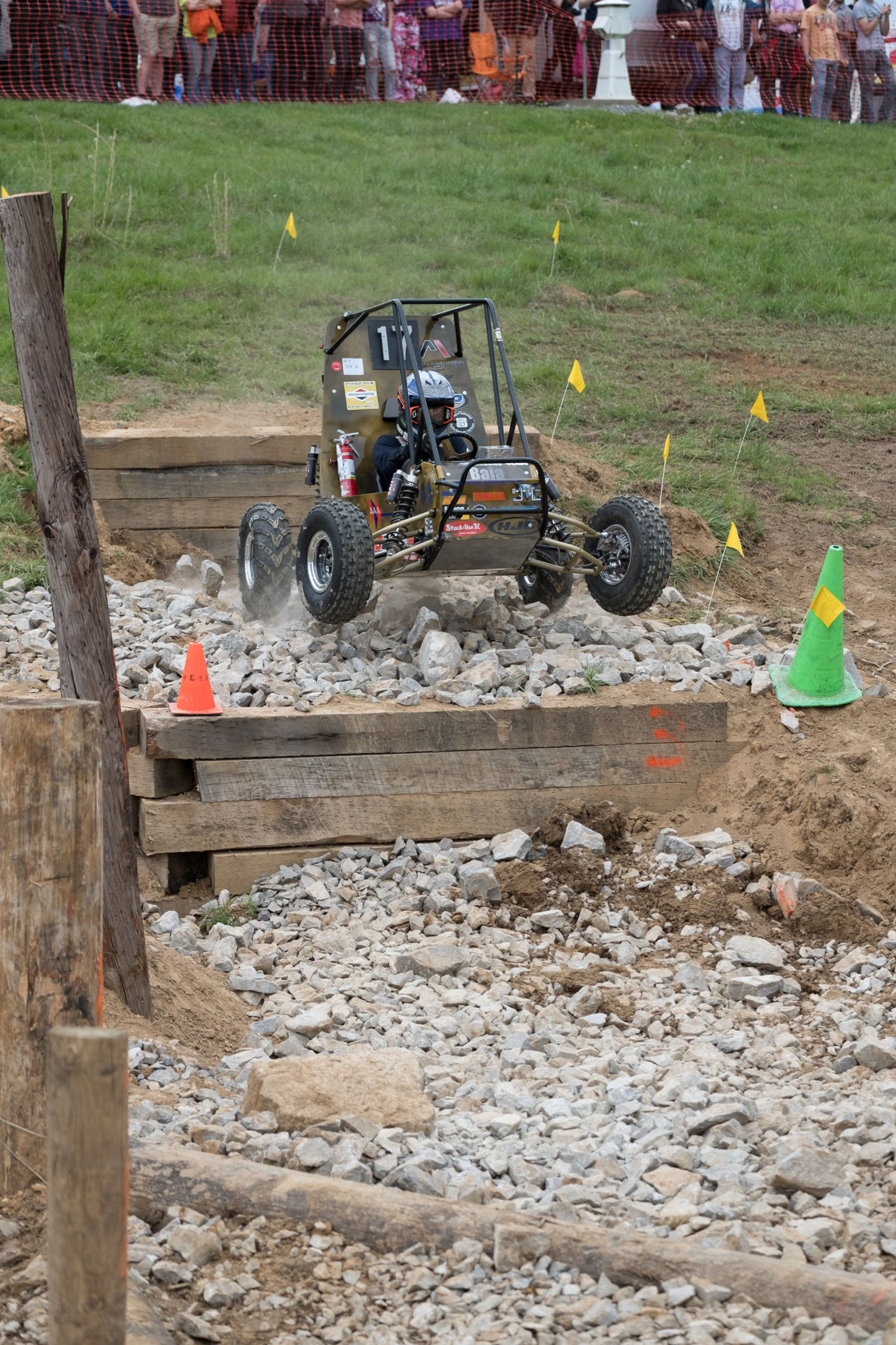
Picture of the Purdue University Northwest vehicle navigating a jump at the 2019 Baja Midwest event at Tennessee Tech University.

Each year around 141 Baja cars are entered in the Baja SAE events across the US and around the world. International events are endorsed by SAE International and are held in Brazil, Korea, South Africa and México.

All vehicles are powered by a 14 hp Kohler Command Pro CH440 engine with a modified restrictor plate label for competition testing. Kohler and SAE International entered an agreement where Kohler will provide engines at discount to participating teams for the 2023–2026 competition seasons. Use of the same engine by all teams creates a more challenging engineering design test. Prior to 2023, small engine manufacturer Briggs & Stratton sponsored Baja SAE teams by providing an unmodified Briggs & Stratton Model 19 Vanguard engine single-cylinder, with a displacement of 305 cc and power output of approximately 10 bhp (7.5 kW), free of charge for every two years in competition.

There are multiple dynamic events, photographed by Official SAE Photographer Jethro Gaines of J. Gaines Studio, usually four per event, as well as a single four-hour endurance race. The dynamic events include hill climbs, sled pulls, maneuverability events, rock crawls, and suspension & traction events. Previously the cars had to be able to float and propel itself on water under its own power. This was changed from the 2012 competitions onward due to safety concerns.

Static events, such as written reports, presentations and design evaluations are provided by participating teams. This is when the teams are judged on ergonomics, functionality, and producibility of their cars; ensuring that the final placement of the team does not rest solely on the vehicle's performance but rather on a combination of static and dynamic events. Required reports detail the engineering and design process that was used in developing each system of the team's vehicle, supported with sound engineering principles.

Also, a cost report that provides all the background information necessary to verify the vehicle's actual cost is used to rate the most economically feasible for production. These reports are submitted weeks in advance of each event, where the presentations and design evaluations are given on site in the presence of SAE design judges. Teams with noticeable differences between the car and the cost report can be audited, where if the report and car do not match, the team will be served penalty points.

Starting in 2022, all cars were required to utilize a 4WD drive train system. Top teams had locked into a standard design in recent years, so the new drive train requirements serves as an opportunity for students to design systems from the ground up and shake up the design possibilities.

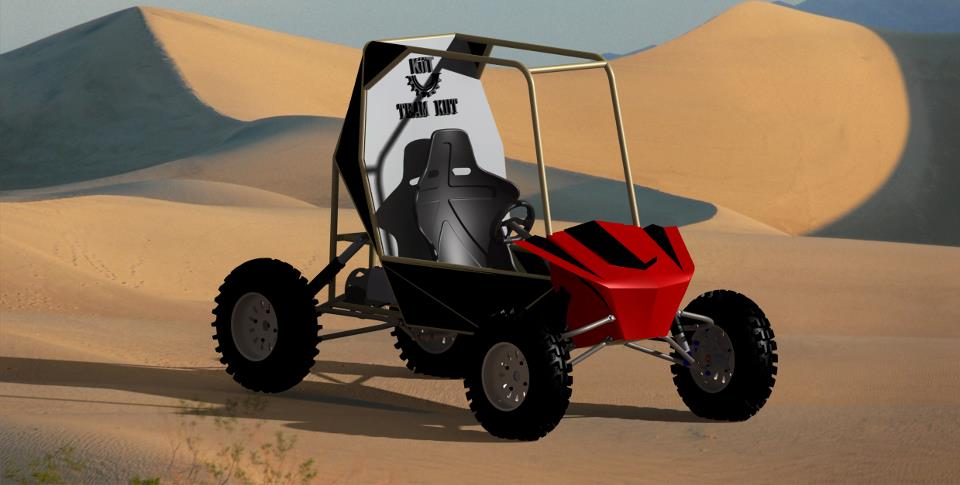
3D CAD Model designed using Solidworks and CATIA V5 by the TEAM - KIIT of KIIT University, Bhubaneswar in preparation for the 2013 Baja event at Indore, India

== Origins ==
The Baja SAE Competition originated at the University of South Carolina in 1976, under the supervision of Dr. Harit Mehta. Only 10 teams took part in the very first race. Since that time, the competition has grown to become a premier engineering design series with over 110 university teams participating in each race.

== Objectives ==
Baja SAE® consists of competitions that simulate real-world engineering design projects and their related challenges. Engineering students are tasked to design and build an off-road vehicle that will survive the severe punishment of rough terrain. Each team's goal is to design and build a single-seat, all-terrain, sporting vehicle whose structure contains the driver. The vehicle is to be a prototype for a reliable, maintainable, ergonomic, and economic production vehicle that serves a recreational user market.

The object of the competition is to provide SAE student members with a challenging project that involves the design, planning and manufacturing tasks found when introducing a new product to the consumer industrial market. Teams compete against one another to have their design accepted for manufacture by a fictitious firm. Students must function as a team to not only design, build, test, promote, and race a vehicle within the limits of the rules, but also to generate financial support for their project and manage their educational priorities.

== Static Events ==
The static events are usually held on the first two days of competition. Static events consist of: Technical Inspection, Cost, Design Judging, and Sales Presentation.

=== Technical Inspection ===
All vehicles competing in the race must pass through Tech Inspection. The vehicles are checked by inspectors to make sure that teams adhere to the rules and safety standards set by SAE. New for the 2015 season is a required frame pre-check. All teams must submit frame documentation and frame drawings to be approved by SAE prior to the races. Other parts of the car that are checked include the fuel cell, firewall, seat, and harness mounting. Due to COVID-19, the original 4WD rule change for the 2021 season was pushed back to the 2022 season. All cars starting in 2022 must utilize a 4WD drive train system.

=== Cost Event ===
Teams submit a cost report before races. The cost report may consist of a maximum of three sections: Overview (optional), Costing Sheets, and Cost Documentation. The optional overview "is intended to give each team the opportunity to point out, and briefly comment on, any design features or fabrication processes that are innovative or are expected to result in significant cost savings. Teams may also use the overview to explain items or processes that might appear to be discrepancies within the report." "The core of the report is the series of costing sheets. This section must contain the one-page summary sheet broken up into the individual subsystems." The Cost Documentation "includes copies of receipts, invoices, price tags, catalog pages, online prices, or other documentation, to substantiate the costs of the parts and materials of any item costing more than $30. Cost documentation must be at full retail US prices. The use of foreign receipts, purchases from discount sites such as Craigslist, EBay or junk yards are not allowed. Starting in 2016, transponders are no longer part of the cost report and therefore no documentation for them is needed either. The report is expected to be comprehensive, well documented, truthful and accurate." At the race, the ten teams with lowest cost in their cost report are then audited by an official. The official will go in depth to review the cost documents and compare them to the actual vehicle. Missing items or math errors will be added to the cost document and a penalty may be issued.

=== Design Judging ===
Design Judging is when teams have the opportunity to defend/explain the reasoning used behind designing their vehicle. Prior to the race weekend, a Design Report is submitted. This report is reviewed by the judges who will be judging the vehicle during the event. Taken from the SAE rules, "Students will be judged on the creation of design specifications and the ability to meet those specifications, computer aided drafting, analysis, testing and development, manufacturability, serviceability, system integration and how the vehicle works together as a whole...The vehicle that illustrates the best use of engineering to meet the design goals and the best understanding of the design by the team members will win the design event."

=== Sales Presentation ===
Since the 2014 season, the sales presentation has been a standard static event at every race. The entire premise behind the Baja SAE competition is to compete for a fictitious contract to manufacture 4000 units a year. The sales presentation is pitching to a panel of "executives" of a hypothetical manufacturing company to try and convince them to purchase the team's vehicle design and can be able to give a boost to your overall performance. The presentation is limited to 10 minutes, with a 5-minute question period. "The presentation event will be scored based on such categories as

1. The content of the presentation

2. The organization of the presentation

3. The effectiveness of the visual aids

4. The speaker's delivery, and

5. The team's responses to the judge's questions. The team's score will be the average of the individual judge's scores." M,NBH3

== Dynamic Events ==
Dynamic Events are usually held on the final two days of competition. The first dynamic day includes the following events: Acceleration, Hill Climb or Traction Event, Maneuverability, Specialty Events (Rock Crawl, Mud Bog, and Suspension). On the second dynamic day, an endurance race is held.

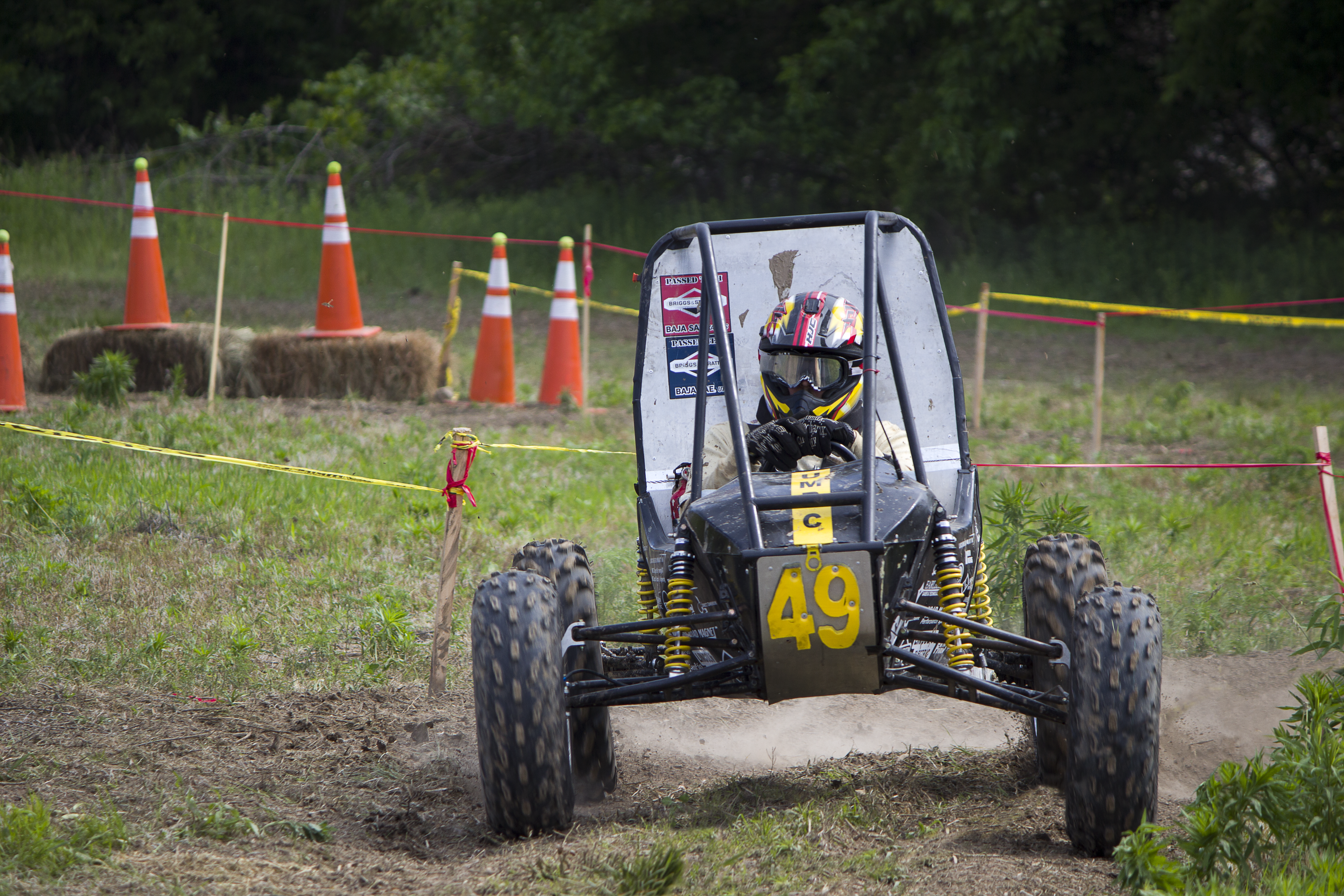
UMBC Racing Maneuverability run during Kansas 2014 competition

=== Acceleration ===
The acceleration event is a measure of a vehicle's acceleration. The event is a 30.48 or 45.72 m (100.0 or 150.0 ft) straight run from a standing start. The faster the time the more points the team will score. Every team can make two attempts with the best time counting for score. Vehicles with acceleration times that are more than 1.5 times that of the fastest vehicle will not receive a score for this event.

=== Hill Climb or Traction Event and Maneuverability ===
This event tests the vehicle's ability to climb an incline from a standing start or pull a designated object. Every team can make two attempts with the best time or distance counting for score.

Maneuverability is designed to assess each vehicle's handling ability over typical Baja terrain. The course may consist of a variety of challenges at the organizer's option, possibly including tight turns, pylon maneuvers, ruts and bumps, drop-offs, sand, rocks, gullies, logs, and inclines. Each vehicle may make two (2) runs with the best time, including penalties, counting for score. Only vehicles that complete the maneuverability course within a time not exceeding 2.5 times that of the fastest vehicle will receive a score.

There are minor and major penalties that can be given during the maneuverability event. A minor penalty is given when an obstacle/pylon is moved. A major penalty is given when a gate is missed. Missing a gate is classified as two or more wheels are outside of the gate. Every minor penalty adds 2 seconds to a vehicle's time, and every major penalty adds 10 seconds.

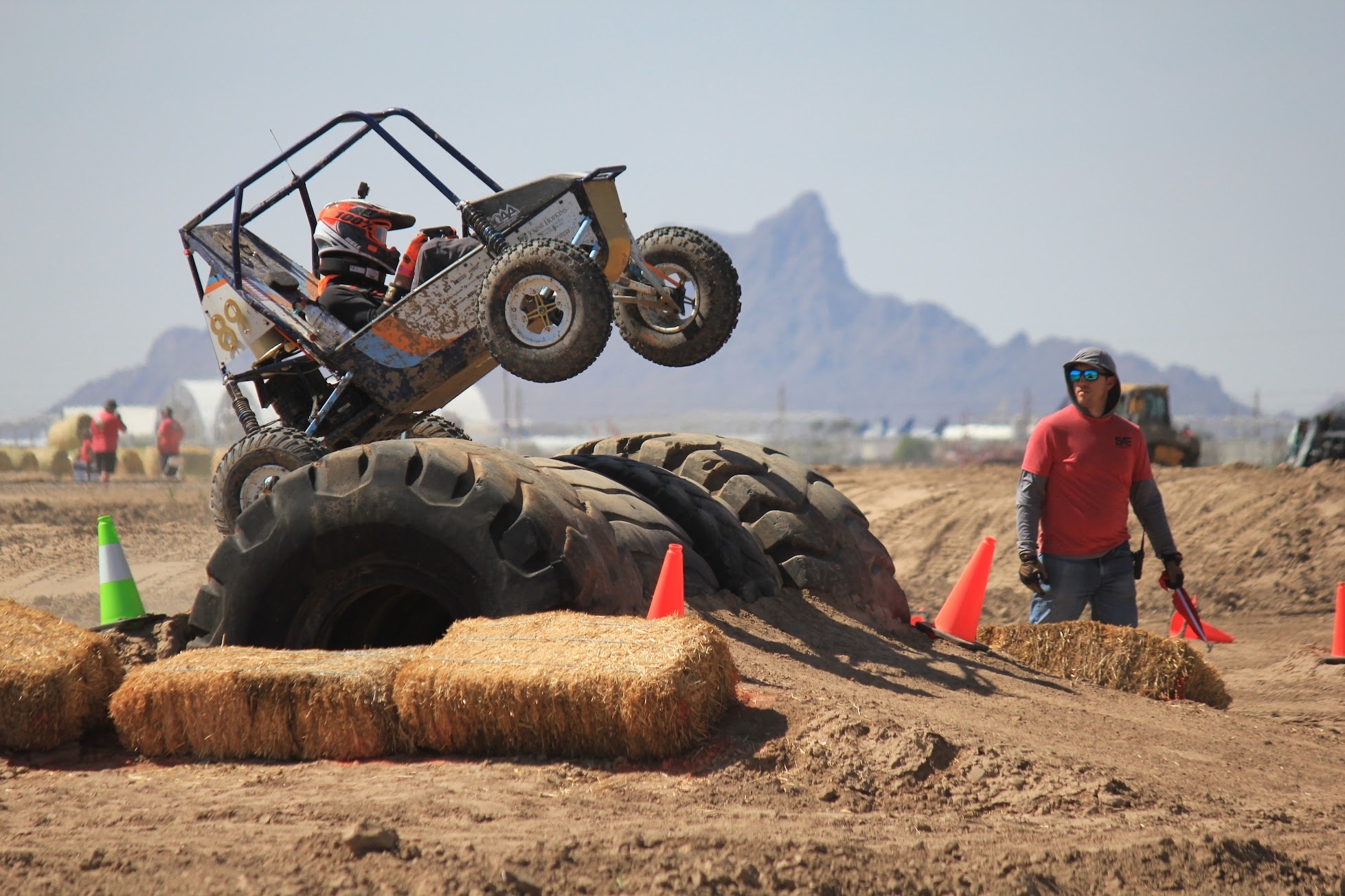
Blue Jay Racing (Johns Hopkins University) vehicle during a specialty suspension and traction event at Arizona 2025.

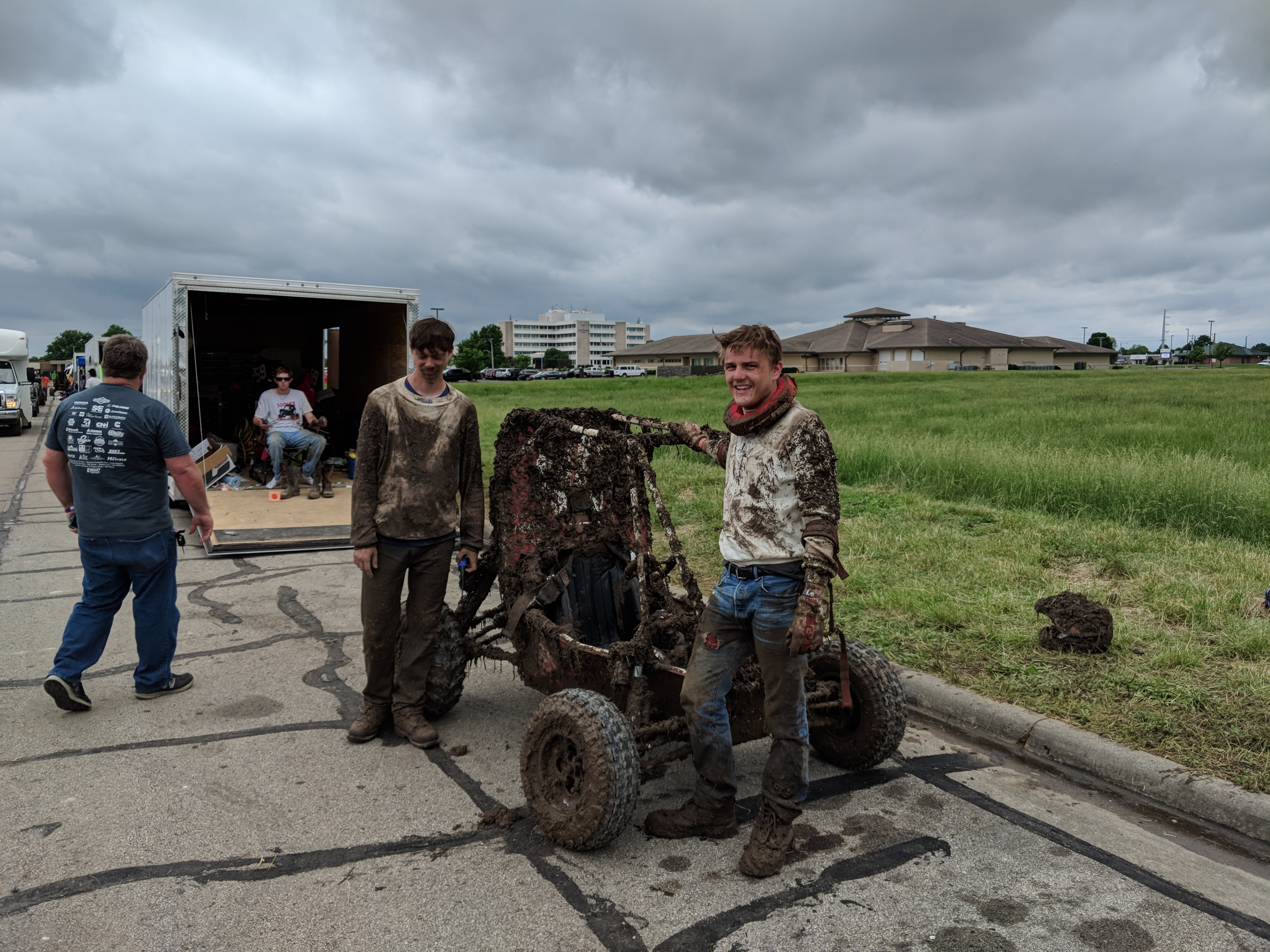
Univ. of Oklahoma vehicle after an extremely muddy endurance race at Kansas 2018.

=== Specialty Events ===
Specialty Events are designed to test the vehicle under unique off-road conditions that might be available at some Baja SAE competition sites. Examples of specialty events are: Rock Crawl; Mud Bog; and Suspension. Specialty events will be announced at the time of opening of registration for a competition.

=== Endurance Race ===
The endurance event assesses each vehicle's ability to operate continuously and at speed over rough terrain containing obstacles in any weather conditions. Endurance may be run for either time or distance. Endurance events for time usually run for 4 hours. Endurance events for distance continue until at least one car has gone the specified distance. The starting grid for endurance will be based on each team's performance in a previous dynamic event, or set of dynamic events, to be determined by the organizer. Endurance mainly checks the working capacity of the vehicle. Cars that break down during the race are removed from the track, and teams are able to make repairs to the car during the race.

=== BAJA SAE competitions around the world ===
Both official and non-official events are held throughout the year. The competition schedule is released by the governing body (Baja SAE) for official events. Unofficial events may be hosted throughout the year by universities and other organizations. These unofficial competitions tend to be smaller and feature more local teams.

Endorsed by SAE International	Unsanctioned by SAE International
BAJA SAE USA events hosted by SAE International Locations will change yearly and are dependent on local support of SAE Sections, Universities, and Sponsor Companies.	BAJA SAE India, hosted by SAE India
BAJA SAE Brazil, hosted by SAE Brazil	BAJA SAE China, hosted by SAE China
BAJA SAE Korea, hosted by Yeungnam University	BAJA Regional hosted in the South, Northeast and Southeast of Brazil.
BAJA SAE South Africa, sponsored by Sasol and hosted by Gerotek Test Facility	Épreuve du Nord hosted by Université Laval
BAJA SAE México hosted by SAE México	Louisville Midnight Mayhem hosted by University of Louisville
	Backwoods hosted by University of Wisconsin–Stout
	Winter Baja hosted by Michigan Technological University
	OktoBAJAfest hosted by Clarkson University
	Butler Bash hosted by Grove City College

== Virtual Competitions ==
In 2020, BAJA SAE competitions around the world were suspended in order to meet the health and safety requirements established by the World Health Organization to help prevent spread of SARS-CoV-2. A number of events organized virtual competitions as an opportunity to participate in BAJA SAE competition with a statics presentation (Design, Cost and Sales Presentation) prepared by each team.

Virtual Competitions:

- BAJA SAE USA Events

- BAJA SAE Brazil

- BAJA SAE México

== eBAJA ==
eBAJA is an electric engine driven BAJA event organised by SAEINDIA. This was a new initiative introduced in 2014 on the counsel of former president of India, APJ Abdul Kalam, in order to promote greener mobility. All entries in this category run on rechargeable lithium ion batteries. Teams of students need to design and build electric powered ATV that has traction motor of 48 V with fully automatic transmission having 10.83 gear ratios and 110 Ah battery pack.

== Results ==
`Overall
Season
2024-2025
First Competition
Top 10 teams at Baja SAE Arizona

1	86	Cornell Univ Cornell Baja Racing	925.24
2	78	Ecole de Technologie Superieure Baja ÉTS	918.63
3	89	Johns Hopkins Univ Blue Jay Racing	915.74
4	76	Case Western Reserve Univ CWRU Motorsports	905.62
5	93	Univ of Michigan - Ann Arbor Michigan Baja Racing	863.27
6	95	California Polytechnic State Univ-SLO Cal Poly Racing	819.21
7	90	Purdue Univ - W Lafayette Purdue Baja Racing	798.94
8	82	Virginia Tech VT Baja	785.78
9	85	McMaster Univ McMaster Baja Racing	761.17
10	33	Oregon State Univ Beaver Racing	717.06

Second Competition
Top 10 teams at Baja SAE Maryland

1	64	Cornell Univ Cornell Baja Racing	979.21
2	108	Univ of Michigan - Ann Arbor Michigan Baja Racing	964.59
3	29	Rochester Institute of Technology RIOT RACING	922.48
4	42	Purdue Univ - W Lafayette Purdue Baja Racing	918.78
5	23	Ecole de Technologie Superieure Baja ÉTS	912.64
6	41	Case Western Reserve Univ CWRU Motorsports	908.56
7	33	Univ of Wisconsin - Madison Badger Racing	827.61
8	71	North Carolina State Univ - Raleigh Pack Motorsports Baja	824.04
9	86	Youngstown State Univ Penguin Baja Racing	812.57
10	32	Université Laval Alérion Baja Ulaval	808.87

Third Competition
Top 10 teams at Baja SAE Carolina

1	48	Cornell Univ Cornell Baja Racing	984.47
2	54	Univ of Michigan - Ann Arbor Michigan Baja Racing	969.36
3	43	Ecole de Technologie Superieure Baja ÉTS	955.37
4	38	Johns Hopkins Univ Blue Jay Racing	892.32
5	46	Purdue Univ - W Lafayette Purdue Baja Racing	863.77
6	60	Rochester Institute of Technology RIOT RACING	862.31
7	37	Case Western Reserve Univ CWRU Motorsports	823.25
8	88	North Carolina State Univ - Raleigh Pack Motorsports Baja	748.32
9	103	Universidade Federal De Minas Gerais Baja UFMG	745.80
10	71	Universidade de Santa Cruz do Sul Baja de Galpão - UNISC	702.60

== See also ==
- Formula SAE
- Basic Utility Vehicle Competition
- Off-roading
- Student design competition
- Society of Automotive Engineers
