= Human Powered Vehicle Challenge =

Student design competition

HPVC
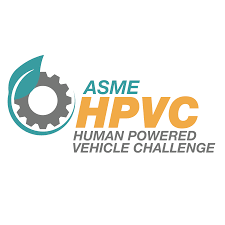
- Frequency: Annually
- Inaugurated: 1983
- Most recent: April 2024
- Organiser: American Society of Mechanical Engineers
- Website: efests.asme.org/competitions/human-powered-vehicle-challenge-(hpvc)

The Human Powered Vehicle Challenge (HPVC) is a student design competition organized by ASME (American Society of Mechanical Engineers). The competition was started in 1983 at the University of California, Davis.

== Concept ==
The HPVC is an engineering design and innovation competition that gives students the opportunity to network and apply engineering principles through the design, fabrication, and racing of human powered vehicles. ASME's international Human Powered Vehicle Challenge (HPVC) provides an opportunity for students to demonstrate the application of sound engineering design principles in the development of sustainable and practical transportation alternatives. In the HPVC, students work in teams to design and build efficient, highly engineered vehicles for everyday use—from commuting to work, to carrying goods to market.

While the competition format has evolved throughout the years, it is typically made up of three main parts. The first is the design and engineering of the vehicle, the second is the speed of the vehicle, and the third is the practicality of the vehicle tested through an endurance event.

=== Design ===
The most important segment of the challenge is design. Contestants must submit a detailed design report with sections including analysis, design, and testing. The design report also includes references to prior work if the vehicle uses elements from a prior year, as well as a section for future work and the goals of the vehicle. The design report is paired with a Critical Design Review (CDR). The CDR consists of each team presenting their vehicle in a set amount of time to a panel of judges. The judges are allowed and encouraged to ask challenging questions to test the knowledge of the presenters. These two sections are scored and are combined for the design segment of the challenge.

==== Innovation ====
From 2012 to 2018 an innovation segment was added. Scored separately from design, it was based on both the design report and design review, and judged contestants on how innovative their vehicles were.

=== Speed ===
The foundation of the challenge is based in speed and has often been associated with the World Speed Challenge held at Battle Mountain, Nevada. Speed events have been divided into two categories: sprints and drag races.

==== Sprint ====
Top speed is recorded in the sprint event. Set within a defined overall distance, the vehicle has a set distance to accelerate, a set distance to reach and record its top speed, and a set distance to stop.

==== Drag race ====
The drag race is a head-to-head event in which two vehicles race to a predefined distance. The winner moves on in a double elimination-style tournament.

=== Endurance ===
The endurance event is a timed 2.5-hour race where the objective is to complete as many laps as possible. Laps are typically 1–3 kilometers (0.62–1.86 mi) in length. Each lap has multiple obstacles including, hairpin turns, stop signs, quick turns, rumble strips, a slalom section, and a parcel delivery task. After 2.5 hours, each team's total laps are recorded and any penalties, such as missed stops or knocked-over obstacles, are assigned. The team with the greatest distance covered wins.

== History ==
=== 1983–2001 ===
The first competition took place in 1983 at University of California, Davis. The original objective was to reach the highest speed possible. The inaugural event was won by California State University, Chico. In 1989 Portland State University won the 7th annual competition hosted by California State University, Northridge. It wasn't until 1993 that University of California Davis won the challenge that they started.

=== 2002–2009 ===
Beginning in 2002, each year's competition was held in more than one location, with designations of "east" and "west". Consisted of a three-class system with single-rider, multi-rider, and utility vehicle being scored separately. Single- and multi-rider vehicles were scored based on design, a 2.5-hour endurance event, and a sprint event. The utility vehicles were scored on design and a utility event.

In 2004, University of Missouri, Rolla (now Missouri University of Science and Technology) won their 2nd challenge in three years. This would start a run where Missouri S&T would place in the top three overall for eleven years straight.

=== 2010–2011 ===
Vehicles classes were reduced to two: a speed class and an unrestricted class. Vehicle were scored on design, the endurance race, men's sprint event, and a now separated women's sprint event. Missouri S&T swept both the East and West competitions in 2010 for the speed class. In 2011 University of Toronto won first overall in the unrestricted class.

=== 2012–2019 ===
The vehicle class was reduced to a single designation, with an added Innovation category to be scored separately. In 2014, the first Human Powered Vehicle Challenge to take place in India was held at the Indian Institute of Technology, Delhi. More than 400 students and 36 teams from more than 30 universities turned out for the competition.

In 2016, the University of Akron won first overall at the East competition which took place in Athens, Ohio, after placing second overall at the West Competition a few weeks earlier.

=== 2020–present ===
The COVID-19 pandemic forced the competition to be held online and as a design event only. The decade's first in-person competition was hosted by Liberty University in 2023 in Lynchburg, Virginia.

== Results ==
Challenge results are available beginning in 2002, the first year of the "modern" format of the competition, and the first year for which records are easily accessible.
