= Great Northern Concrete Toboggan Race =

Annual engineering contest in Winnipeg

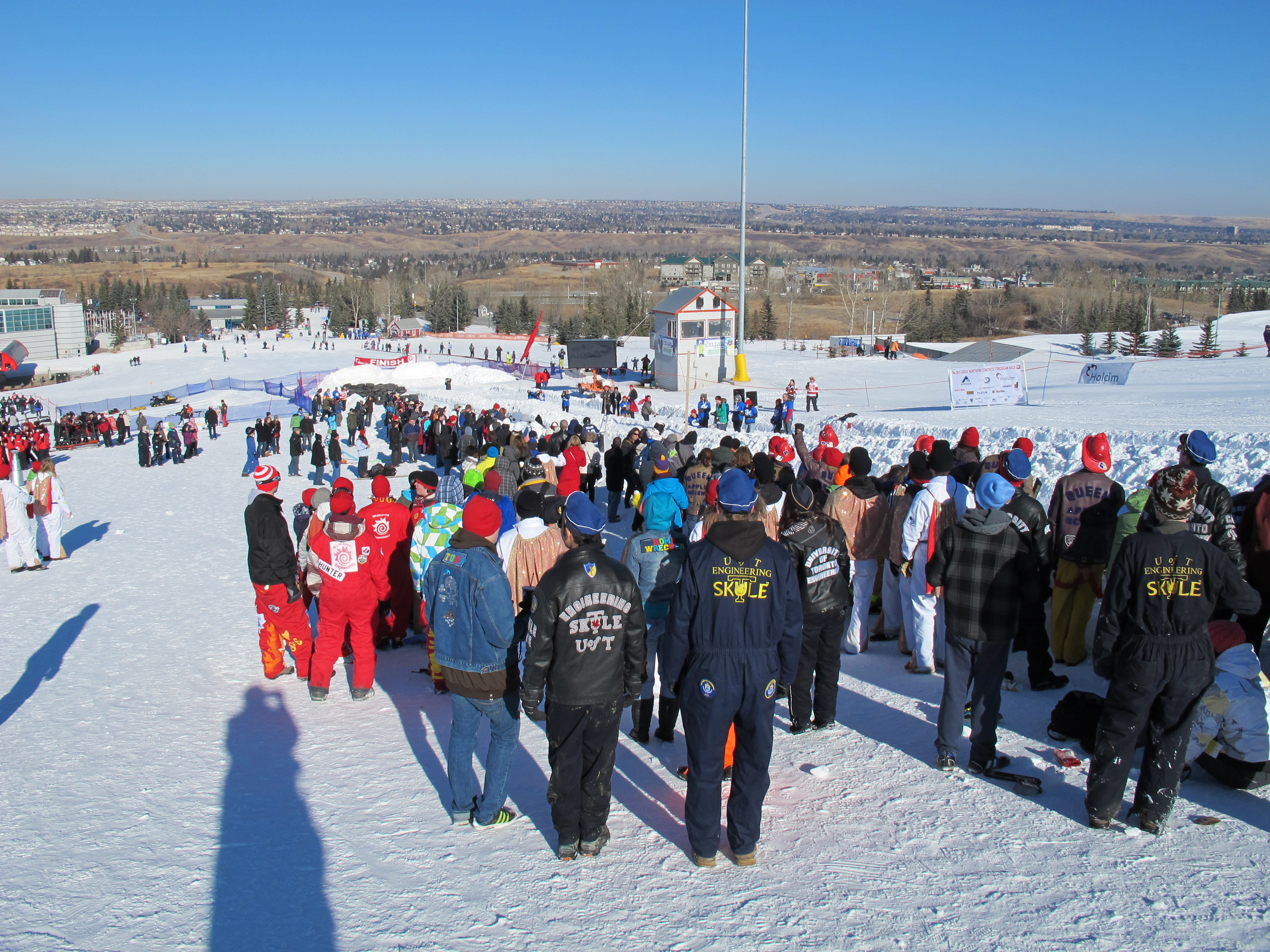
- Type: Engineering Student Competition
- Established: 1974
- Location: Canada

The Great Northern Concrete Toboggan Race (GNCTR) is an annual event that challenges the creativity of engineering students. The competition originated in 1974 and was created by Dr. S. H. Simmonds, president of the Alberta chapter of the American Concrete Institute. The first race was held in 1975 with participants from the University of Alberta, University of Calgary, Northern Alberta Institute of Technology, and Southern Alberta Institute of Technology. Since its beginning, GNCTR has grown to include universities and technical schools from across Canada with occasional entries from the United States and Europe.

== Rules ==
The project involves designing and constructing a toboggan with a metal frame and a running surface made completely out of concrete and racing it down a steep snow-covered hill. The sled must weigh less than 350 pounds (158.8 kg), have a working braking system, and be fitted with a roll cage to protect its five passengers. Each competing team must complete a technical report summarizing the design, which is presented at a public technical exhibition.

== Spirit ==
It is traditional for teams to choose a theme for their sled; they often wear appropriate costumes and incorporate elements of the design into their technical exhibit and sled aesthetics. Themes have become a major part of the competition, making up a large part of the spirit award, as well as the best uniforms award. Theme ideas are most often drawn from popular culture, retro references, or are based on the team's home university/college and its location.

== Awards ==
Teams are judged for top speed, best run, most improved, braking, steering, and aesthetics. Each year, an award is also given for the best overall entry.

The current record holder for top speed in a successfully completed run at GNCTR is the University of Toronto, who set a speed of 73 km/h on Feb 1, 2020.

The Race Champion is qualified as the team who wins the King of the Hill competition on race day.

Year	Overall Champion	Race Champion	Spirit Award
2026	University of Alberta	University of British Columbia Okanagan	Concordia University
2025	University of Toronto	Western University	University of Calgary
2024	University of British Columbia Okanagan	University of Toronto	McMaster University
2023	Western University	University of Toronto	McMaster University
2022	Not Awarded	Not Awarded	University of Calgary
2021	Not Awarded	Not Awarded	Ryerson University
2020	University of Toronto	University of Toronto	Concordia University
2019	Ryerson University	Ryerson University	University of Calgary
2018	Southern Alberta Institute of Technology	Lawrence Technological University	University of British Columbia Okanagan
2017	Queen's University	Southern Alberta Institute of Technology	University of Calgary
2016	Western University	Lawrence Technological University	University of Calgary
2015	University of Calgary	University of Calgary	University of Calgary
2014	University of Alberta	University of British Columbia Okanagan	University of Toronto
2013	Western University	University of Toronto	McMaster University
2012	Ryerson University	Ryerson University	Queen's University
2011	University of Calgary	University of Saskatchewan	McMaster University
2010	University of Alberta	University of Calgary	Queen's University
2009	University of Manitoba		
2008	University of Waterloo		
2007	Université de Sherbrooke		University of Alberta
2006	Royal Military College of Canada	University of Western Ontario	
2005	Carleton University		McMaster University
2004	University of Calgary		McMaster University
2003	University of Manitoba		McMaster University
2002	University of Waterloo		Carleton University
2001	University of British Columbia		McMaster University
2000	University of Calgary		University of Manitoba
1999	University of Manitoba		University of Manitoba
1998	University of Waterloo		University of Manitoba
1997	University of Waterloo		
1996	École Polytechnique de Montréal	École Polytechnique de Montréal	
1995	University of Waterloo		
1994	Universität Stuttgart		
1993	University of Alberta		University of Manitoba
1992	Universite de Sherbrooke		
1991	École de technologie supérieure		
1990	École Polytechnique de Montréal		
1989	University of Calgary		University of Waterloo
1988	University of British Columbia		
1987	University of British Columbia		University of Waterloo
1986	Southern Alberta Institute of Technology		University of Waterloo
1985			University of Waterloo
1984	University of Manitoba		University of Waterloo
1981	University of Manitoba		
1980	University of British Columbia		
1979	Northern Alberta Institute of Technology		
1977	University of British Columbia		
1975	Southern Alberta Institute of Technology		

== Competition host ==
In the early years of the competition, the winning team was asked to host the subsequent competition. By the mid-1990s, this practice had changed to an alternating scheme between Western and Eastern Canadian schools; the dividing line is the Manitoba-Ontario border. The competition usually runs from Wednesday to Sunday, at the end of January or over the first weekend in February.

Year	Host School	City
2026	Western University	London
2025	Concordia University	Montreal
2024	Memorial University of Newfoundland	St. John's
2023	University of British Columbia (Okanagan Campus)	Kelowna
2022	Southern Alberta Institute of Technology, University of Calgary	Virtually
2021	Southern Alberta Institute of Technology, University of Calgary	Virtually
2020	University of Toronto	Toronto
2019	University of Alberta	Edmonton
2018	University of Waterloo	Waterloo
2017	University of Manitoba	Winnipeg
2016	University of Ottawa	Ottawa
2015	University of British Columbia (Okanagan Campus)	Kelowna
2014	University of Western Ontario	London
2013	University of British Columbia	Vancouver
2012	University of Calgary	Calgary
2011	University of Alberta	Edmonton
2010	McMaster University	Hamilton
2009	University of Calgary	Red Deer
2008	Université de Sherbrooke	Sherbrooke
2007	University of Manitoba	Winnipeg
2006	École de technologie supérieure and Concordia University	Montreal
2005	University of Calgary	Calgary
2004	Carleton University	Ottawa
2003	University of Alberta	Edmonton
2002	University of Manitoba	Winnipeg
2001	Queen's University/Royal Military College of Canada	Kingston
2000	University of Regina	Regina
1999	University of Waterloo	Waterloo
1998	University of Calgary	Calgary
1997	Carleton University	Ottawa
1996	University of Manitoba	Winnipeg
1995	École Polytechnique de Montréal	Montreal
1994	University of Alberta	Edmonton
1993	Université de Sherbrooke	Sherbrooke
1992	École de technologie supérieure	Montreal
1991	École Polytechnique de Montréal	Montreal
1990	University of Calgary	Calgary
1988	University of British Columbia	Vancouver
1985	University of Manitoba	Winnipeg
1984	University of Alberta	Edmonton
1982	University of Manitoba	Winnipeg
1981	University of British Columbia	Vancouver
1980	Northern Alberta Institute of Technology	Edmonton
1978	University of British Columbia	Vancouver
1975	University of Calgary, University of Alberta, Southern Alberta Institute of Technology, Northern Alberta Institute of Technology	Red Deer

== See also ==
- Concrete canoe
