= Concrete canoe =

Canoe made of concrete

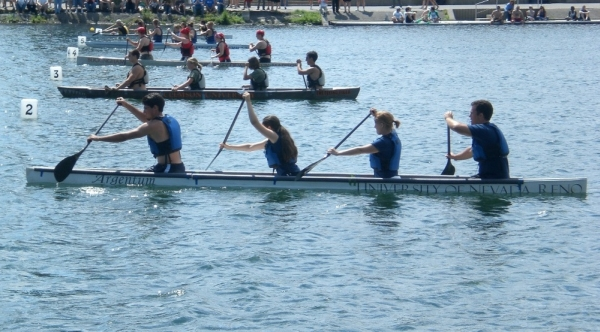
Coed sprint race at 2008 National Concrete Canoe Competition in Montreal, Quebec

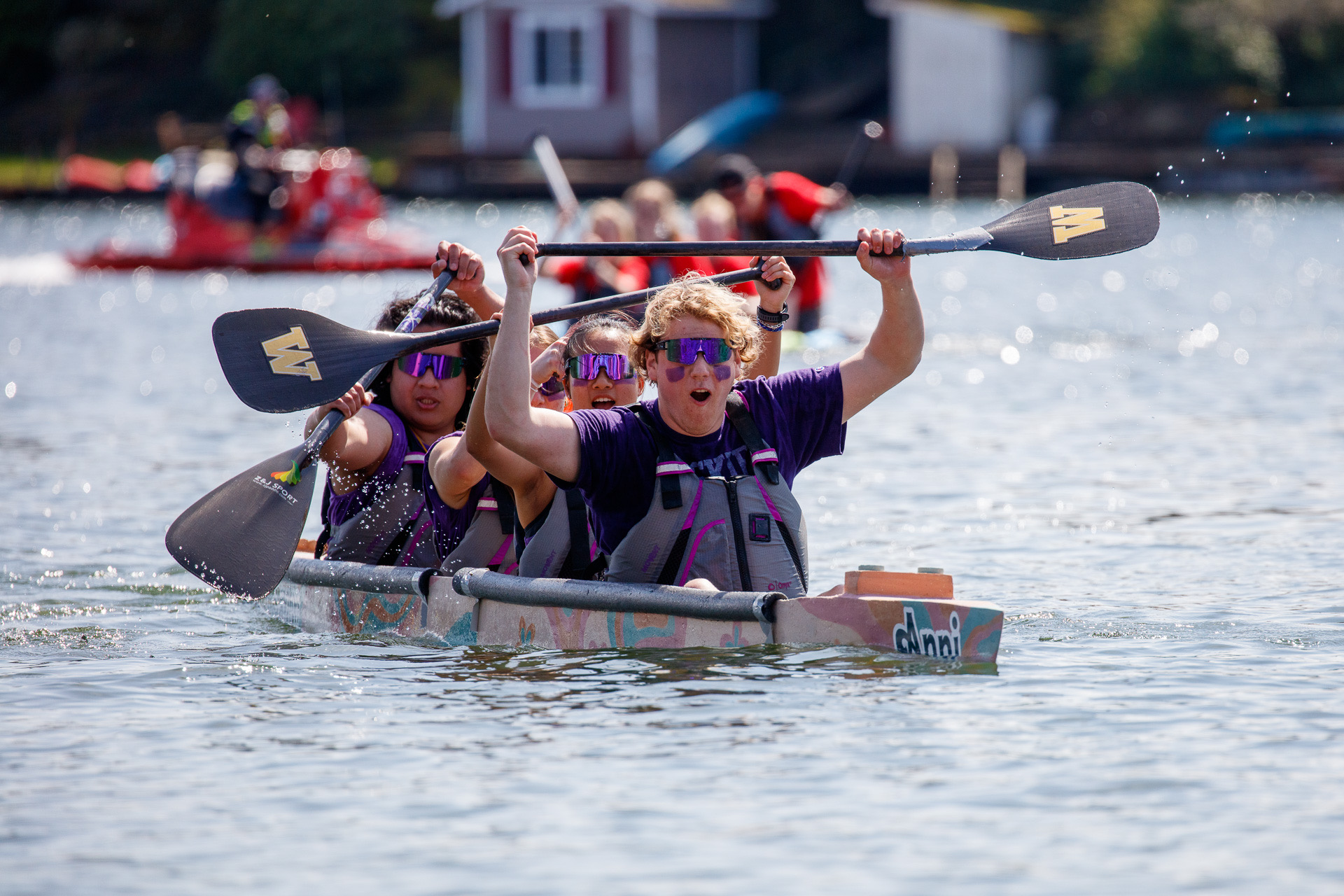
Coed University of Washington sprint race at 2025 Regionals Concrete Canoe Competition in Portland, Oregon

A concrete canoe is a canoe made of concrete, typically created for an engineering competition.

In spirit, the event is similar to that of a cardboard boat race—make the seemingly unfloatable float. However, since concrete and other poured surfaces are an integral part of a civil engineer's education, concrete canoes typically feature more development than cardboard boats.

== Principles ==
Ignoring hydrodynamic effects, all ships or boats float because the weight of the water they displace is equal to the weight of the boat (Archimedes' principle). However, many boats are made of materials that are denser than water, meaning that the boat will sink if filled with water.

Being designed for an engineering competition, concrete canoes often make use of experimental or innovative concrete mix designs or fabrication processes, such as 3D-printed formworks, smart dynamic casting, or 3D-printed concrete.

Most competitive concrete canoes have concrete mix designs that are less dense than water. They must pass a test in which the canoe is filled with water and pushed below the surface; the canoe must then resurface in order to qualify for racing. This is possible because, unlike normal concrete which uses sand and small rocks, concrete canoes are created with porous aggregates such as Macrolite and microspheres. However, because some teams may choose to design their concrete mixes to be denser than water, teams are also allowed to insert concrete-covered, non-structural foam pieces in their canoes to make the canoes float after being submerged.

== ASCE National Competition ==
The ASCE (American Society of Civil Engineers) National Concrete Canoe Competition (NCCC) provides students with a practical application of the engineering principles they learn in the classroom, along with important team and project management skills they will need in their careers.

Each year, the NCCC, which is held in mid-June, is hosted by an ASCE Student Organization. Some 200 university teams attempt to qualify for the NCCC by placing first in one of the 18 conference competitions held throughout the United States during the spring. Until 2018, teams placing second in a conference competition behind a university that finished in the top five at the previous year's national competition are also invited. This was replaced by the Wild Card drawing in 2018. If the Concrete Canoe team was part of a student chapter that placed within the top one-third of all annual reports, and the team finished within the top half of all teams in their regional competition, the team was eligible for the Wild Card drawing. Of all qualifying teams, six were randomly drawn to attend the 2018 National Concrete Competition. To be eligible to compete in the Concrete Canoe Competition, the entrant school must be a recognized ASCE Student Chapter or ASCE International Student Group. Typically, frontrunners include University of Alabama in Huntsville, University of Nevada, Reno, University of Florida, California Polytechnic State University San Luis Obispo, the University of California at Berkeley, Clemson University, École de technologie supérieure, Université Laval, and the University of Wisconsin–Madison.

The winners of the ASCE National Concrete Canoe Competition are determined by compiling the team's total number of points from the academic and race portions of the competition. Academic scholarships totaling $9,000 are awarded to the winning teams' undergraduate civil engineering program.

=== History ===
Concrete Canoe competition in the United States began in the 1960s, when a small number of ASCE student chapters began holding intramural Concrete Canoe races. Then, in the 1971, the University of Illinois at Urbana-Champaign held the first intercollegiate race against Purdue. In the more than 45 years since, the students’ efforts to combine engineering excellence and hydrodynamic design to construct water-worthy canoes have culminated in an advanced form of concrete construction and racing technique known as the “America’s Cup of Civil Engineering.”

In 1981 as part of the FIP congress in Stockholm, Sweden there was the 1st FIP international concrete canoe race. won by the Danish team from Technical University of Denmark. inspired by Herbert Krenchel

In 1988, ASCE expanded the competition to the national level, when Master Builders, Inc. (now known as BASF) signed-on to become the sole corporate sponsor for the event. In its first year, 18 teams of enthusiastic civil engineering students from the nation's premier academic programs gathered in East Lansing, Mich., to test the waters of this innovative and educational event. Over the next two decades, the competition became a great success, with regional winners traveling across the country by plane, train and Ryder truck, canoes in tow, in their quest to become National Concrete Canoe Competition champions.

As competition was developing in the United States, the idea had also taken hold in other countries. Today, concrete canoe racing happens around the world in places like Germany, South Africa, Canada, Japan and the United Arab Emirates; and with sponsorship from ASCE and the American Concrete Institute (ACI), the 2007 National Concrete Canoe Competition winning team, University of Wisconsin - Madison, travelled to the Netherlands to represent the United States in the 30th Annual Dutch Concrete Canoe Challenge.

The Concrete Canoe Competition is designed to provide civil engineering students with an opportunity to gain hands-on, practical experience and leadership skills by working with concrete mix designs and project management. Organizers, sponsors and participants are dedicated to building awareness of concrete technology and application, as well as the versatility and durability of concrete as a construction material, among civil engineering students, educators, practitioners, the concrete industry and the general public. They also strive to increase awareness among industry leaders, opinion makers and the general public of civil engineering as a dynamic and innovative profession essential to society. In its history, the National Concrete Canoe Competition has challenged the knowledge, creativity and stamina of more than 400 teams and 5000 students. In 2008, more than 200 teams competed in 18 conference competitions to qualify for participation at the national level.

==== Past winners ====
Year	Host city	Host School	Champion	Second Place	Third Place
1988	East Lansing, Michigan	Michigan State University	University of California, Berkeley	University of New Hampshire	University of Akron
1989	Lubbock, Texas	Texas Tech University	University of California, Berkeley	Michigan State University	University of New Hampshire
1990	Buffalo, New York	State University of New York	Michigan State University	University of Maryland, College Park	University of California, Berkeley
1991	Orlando, Florida	University of Central Florida	University of California, Berkeley	University of Maryland, College Park	State University of New York at Buffalo
1992	Fort Collins, Colorado	Colorado State University	University of California, Berkeley	University of Alabama, Huntsville	University of New Orleans
1993	Sacramento, California	California State University, Sacramento	University of Alabama, Huntsville	Michigan State University	University of California, Berkeley
1994	New Orleans, Louisiana	University of New Orleans	University of Alabama, Huntsville	University of California, Berkeley	University of New Orleans
1995	Washington, D.C.	George Washington University	South Dakota School of Mines & Technology	California State University, Sacramento	Michigan State University
1996	Madison, Wisconsin	University of Wisconsin at Madison	University of Alabama, Huntsville	Michigan State University	University of California, Berkeley
1997	Cleveland, Ohio	Cleveland State University	Florida Institute of Technology	University of Alabama, Huntsville	University of California, Berkeley
1998	Rapid City, South Dakota	South Dakota School of Mines & Technology	University of Alabama, Huntsville	California State University, Sacramento	Clemson University
1999	Melbourne, Florida	Florida Institute of Technology	Clemson University	University of Alabama, Huntsville	Oklahoma State University
2000	Golden, Colorado	Colorado School of Mines	Clemson University	Oklahoma State University	Florida Institute of Technology
2001	San Diego, California	San Diego State University	University of Alabama, Huntsville	Clemson University	Oklahoma State University
2002	Madison, Wisconsin	University of Wisconsin	Clemson University	Université Laval	Oklahoma State University
2003	Philadelphia, Pennsylvania	Drexel University	University of Wisconsin, Madison	Université Laval	University of California, Berkeley
2004	Washington, D.C.	The Catholic University of America	University of Wisconsin, Madison	Université Laval	University of Alabama, Huntsville
2005	Clemson, South Carolina	Clemson University	University of Wisconsin, Madison	Clemson University	Michigan Technological University
2006	Stillwater, Oklahoma	Oklahoma State University	University of Wisconsin, Madison	California Polytechnic State University, San Luis Obispo	Clemson University
2007	Seattle, Washington	University of Washington	University of Wisconsin, Madison	University of Florida	University of Nevada, Reno
2008	Montreal, Quebec	École de technologie supérieure	University of Nevada, Reno	University of California, Berkeley	École de technologie supérieure
2009	Tuscaloosa, Alabama	University of Alabama	University of California, Berkeley	École de technologie supérieure	California Polytechnic State University, San Luis Obispo
2010	San Luis Obispo, California	California Polytechnic State University, San Luis Obispo	California Polytechnic State University, San Luis Obispo	University of Nevada, Reno	École de technologie supérieure
2011	Evansville, Indiana	University of Evansville	California Polytechnic State University, San Luis Obispo	University of Wisconsin, Madison	Université Laval
2012	Reno, Nevada	University of Nevada, Reno	California Polytechnic State University, San Luis Obispo	Université Laval	Michigan Technological University
2013	Homer, Illinois	University of Illinois at Urbana-Champaign	École de technologie supérieure	University of Nevada, Reno	University of Florida
2014	Johnstown, Pennsylvania	University of Pittsburgh at Johnstown	University of Nevada, Reno	California Polytechnic State University, San Luis Obispo	Université Laval
2015	Clemson, South Carolina	Clemson University	University of Florida	California Polytechnic State University, San Luis Obispo	University of California, Berkeley
2016	Tyler, Texas	University of Texas at Tyler	École de technologie supérieure	University of California, Los Angeles	University of Nevada, Reno
2017	Golden, Colorado	Colorado School of Mines	California Polytechnic State University, San Luis Obispo	University of Florida	University of Akron
2018	San Diego, California	San Diego State University	California Polytechnic State University, San Luis Obispo	University of Florida	Université Laval
2019	Melbourne, Florida	Florida Institute of Technology	University of Florida	California Polytechnic State University, San Luis Obispo	Université Laval
2020	Not held due to COVID-19	University of Wisconsin	Not held due to COVID-19	Not held due to COVID-19	Not held due to COVID-19
2021	Held Virtually	University of Wisconsin	University of Florida	Youngstown State University	University of Washington
2022	Ruston, Louisiana	Louisiana Tech University	California Polytechnic State University, San Luis Obispo	Université Laval	Western Kentucky University
2023	Platteville, Wisconsin	University of Wisconsin-Platteville	California Polytechnic State University, San Luis Obispo	Youngstown State University	University of Florida
2024	Provo, Utah	Brigham Young University	University of Florida	Université Laval	California Polytechnic State University, San Luis Obispo
2025	San Luis Obispo, California	California Polytechnic State University, San Luis Obispo	University of Florida	Virginia Polytechnic Institute and State University	Western Kentucky University
2026	Fairmont, West Virginia	Fairmont State University	Western Kentucky University	Missouri University of Science and Technology	New York University - Tandon

Championship Records
University	Championships	Championship years	Runner-ups	Runner-up years	3rd Place	3rd Place Years
California Polytechnic State University, San Luis Obispo	7	2010, 2011, 2012, 2017, 2018, 2022, 2023	4	2006, 2014, 2015, 2019	2	2009, 2024
University of Alabama, Huntsville	5	1993, 1994, 1996, 1998, 2001	3	1992, 1997, 1999	1	2004
University of Wisconsin, Madison	5	2003, 2004, 2005, 2006, 2007	1	2011		
University of California, Berkeley	5	1988, 1989, 1991, 1992, 2009	2	1994, 2008	6	1990, 1993, 1996, 1997, 2003, 2015
University of Florida	5	2015, 2019, 2021, 2024, 2025	3	2007, 2017, 2018	2	2014, 2023
Clemson University	3	1999, 2000, 2002	2	2001, 2005	2	1998, 2005
University of Nevada, Reno	2	2008, 2014	2	2010, 2013	2	2007, 2016
École de technologie supérieure	2	2013, 2016	1	2009	2	2008, 2010
Michigan State University	1	1990	3	1989, 1993, 1996	1	1995
South Dakota School of Mines & Technology	1	1995				
Florida Institute of Technology	1	1997			1	2000
Université Laval			6	2002, 2003, 2004, 2012, 2022, 2024	4	2011, 2014, 2018, 2019
University of Maryland, College Park			2	1990, 1991		
California State University, Sacramento			2	1995, 1998		
Youngstown State University			2	2021, 2023		
University of New Hampshire			1	1988	1	1989
Oklahoma State University			1	2000	3	1999, 2001, 20032
University of California, Los Angeles			1	2016		
Virginia Polytechnic Institute and State University			1	2025		
University of New Orleans					2	1992, 1994
Michigan Technological University					2	2005, 2012
University of Akron					2	1988, 2017
Western Kentucky University					2	2022, 2025
New York University Tandon					1	2026
State University of New York at Buffalo					1	1991
University of Washington					1	2021

==== National sponsors ====
Sponsors include BASF, Kiewit Corporation, American Concrete Institute, Holcim, Bentley Systems, Cemex, and Propex.

=== Requirements and preparation ===
Teams of engineering students will gather for a weekend designed to be both challenging and fun. Twenty-five percent of each team's total team score will be based on the engineering design and construction principles used in the creation of their concrete canoe; 25 percent will be based on a technical design report detailing the planning, development, testing and construction of their canoe; and 25 percent will be based on a formal business presentation highlighting the canoe's design, construction, racing ability and other innovative features. The remaining 25 percent of each team's score is based on the performance of the canoe and the paddlers in five different race events: men's and women's slalom/endurance races, and men's, women's and co-ed sprint races.

For the purpose of the competition, concrete is defined as a mixture of cement, of which at least 30% (by mass) must be Portland cement, and aggregate, which must constitute at least 25% (by volume) of the mix. The aggregate need not be conventional construction aggregate (sand, etc.), but may include materials such as hollow glass beads and fibers. Epoxy is not permitted. Up to 50% of the thickness of the canoe may be a reinforcement mesh.

Concrete canoe teams must design their canoes from scratch. Typically they create the shape of the hull with a computer design program specifically made for yachts, canoes, and other watercraft. The shape is optimized for racing. This hull shape is then given to a construction team, responsible for making a mold for the canoe to be formed on. A special concrete mix is designed over several months, emphasizing among other qualities, an optimal balance between strength and low density. The finalized mix design is placed on the form; the hull thickness usually ranges from about 3/8" to 3/4". Teams later spend hundreds of hours sanding and applying exterior graphics to their canoes for a nice finish. Scoring in the competition is based on the quality of construction, race performance, a design paper, and a business presentation.

== Canadian Concrete Canoe ==
Year	Host city	Champion	Second place	Third place
1995	Montreal, Quebec, École de Technologie Supérieure	unknown	unknown	unknown
1996	Montreal, Quebec, École de Technologie Supérieure	Université Laval	Memorial University of Newfoundland	unknown
1997	Montreal, Quebec, École de Technologie Supérieure	Université Laval	University of Toronto	Université de Sherbrooke
1998	Montreal, Quebec, École de Technologie Supérieure	University of Toronto	Université Laval	École de Technologie Supérieure
1999	Sherbrooke, Quebec, Université de Sherbrooke	École de Technologie Supérieure	Université Laval	Queen's University
2000	Kingston, Ontario, Queen's University	Université Laval	École de Technologie Supérieure	Queen's University
2001	Quebec City, Quebec, Laval University	Université Laval	University of Toronto	Queen's University
2002	Toronto, Ontario, University of Toronto	Université Laval	École de Technologie Supérieure	University of Toronto
2003	Montreal, Quebec, École de Technologie Supérieure	Université Laval	Université de Sherbrooke	University of Toronto
2004	Moncton, New Brunswick, Université de Moncton	Université Laval	Université de Sherbrooke	University of Toronto
2005	Windsor, Ontario, St Clair College	Université Laval	Ryerson University	Dalhousie University
2006	Sherbrooke, Quebec, Université de Sherbrooke	Université de Sherbrooke	Université Laval	Queen's University
2007	Kingston, Ontario, Queen's University	Université de Sherbrooke	École de Technologie Supérieure	University of Windsor
2008	Halifax, Nova Scotia, Dalhousie University	École de Technologie Supérieure	Université de Sherbrooke	Université Laval
2009	Montreal, Quebec, École Polytechnique de Montréal	École de Technologie Supérieure	Université Laval	Université de Sherbrooke
2010	Toronto, Ontario, University of Toronto	École de Technologie Supérieure	Université Laval	École Polytechnique de Montréal
2011	Quebec City, Quebec, Laval University	Université Laval	Université de Sherbrooke	École de Technologie Supérieure
2012	Moncton, New Brunswick, Université de Moncton	Université Laval	École de Technologie Supérieure	Université de Sherbrooke
2013	Montreal, Quebec, École de Technologie Supérieure	Université de Sherbrooke	École de Technologie Supérieure	University of Toronto
2014	Sherbrooke, Quebec, Université de Sherbrooke	Université Laval	École de Technologie Supérieure	Université de Sherbrooke
2015	Toronto, Ontario, University of Toronto	Université Laval	École de Technologie Supérieure	École Polytechnique de Montréal
2016	Montréal, Quebec, Mcgill University	École de Technologie Supérieure	Université Laval	Université de Sherbrooke
2017	Quebec City, Quebec, Université Laval	École Polytechnique de Montréal	Université de Sherbrooke	École de Technologie Supérieure
2018	Waterloo, Ontario, University of Waterloo	École de Technologie Supérieure	École Polytechnique de Montréal	Université de Sherbrooke
2019	Montreal, Quebec, École Polytechnique de Montréal	École Polytechnique de Montréal	Université de Sherbrooke	Université Laval
2020	London, Ontario, Ontario, University of Western Ontario	Not held due to COVID-19	Not held due to COVID-19	Not held due to COVID-19
2021 (Online)	Online	University of British Columbia	University of Toronto	University of Waterloo
2022	Université de Sherbrooke	Université Laval	Université de Sherbrooke	University of Toronto
2023	London, Ontario, University of Western Ontario	Université de Sherbrooke	Université Laval	École de Technologie Supérieure
2024	Quebec City, Quebec, Université Laval	Université Laval	Université de Sherbrooke	École de Technologie Supérieure
2025	Winnipeg, Manitoba, University of Manitoba	Université Laval	Université de Sherbrooke	École de Technologie Supérieure
2026	Moncton, New Brunswick, Université de Moncton	Université de Sherbrooke	École de Technologie Supérieur	Université Laval

=== Statistics ===
Université Laval	15 Gold	7 Silver	2 Bronze
École de Technologie Supérieure	6 Gold	8 Silver	6 Bronze
Université de Sherbrooke	5 Gold	9 Silver	6 Bronze
École Polytechnique de Montréal	2 Gold	1 Silver	2 Bronze
University of Toronto	1 Gold	2 Silver	5 Bronze
Queen's University			4 Bronze
Ryerson University (now Toronto Metropolitan University)		1 Silver	
Dalhousie University			1 Bronze
University of Waterloo			1 Bronze
University of Windsor			1 Bronze
York University			
McMaster University			
Université de Moncton			

=== National news ===
==== National appearance ====
- École de Technologie Supérieure
- École Polytechnique de Montréal
- McGill University
- Queen's University
- St-Clair College
- University of Windsor
- University of Manitoba
- Université de Moncton
- Université de Sherbrooke
- Université Laval
- University of Toronto
- University of/d' Ottawa
- University of Waterloo
- University of Western Ontario
- Ryerson University (now TMU)
- University of British Columbia
- Concordia University
- University of Victoria
- Université du Québec à Chicoutimi
- Dalhousie University
- McMaster University

== Concrete canoe community ==
Concrete canoe competitions have a significant following from both present and past competitors. The concrete canoe community now includes a dedicated concrete canoe news website, ConcreteCanoe.org, which follows competitions around the world, as well as Concrete Canoe Magazine, which publishes scientific papers, studies, and articles written on the techniques used by top teams.

== See also ==
- Concrete ship
- Great Northern Concrete Toboggan Race
