= Cardboard boat race =

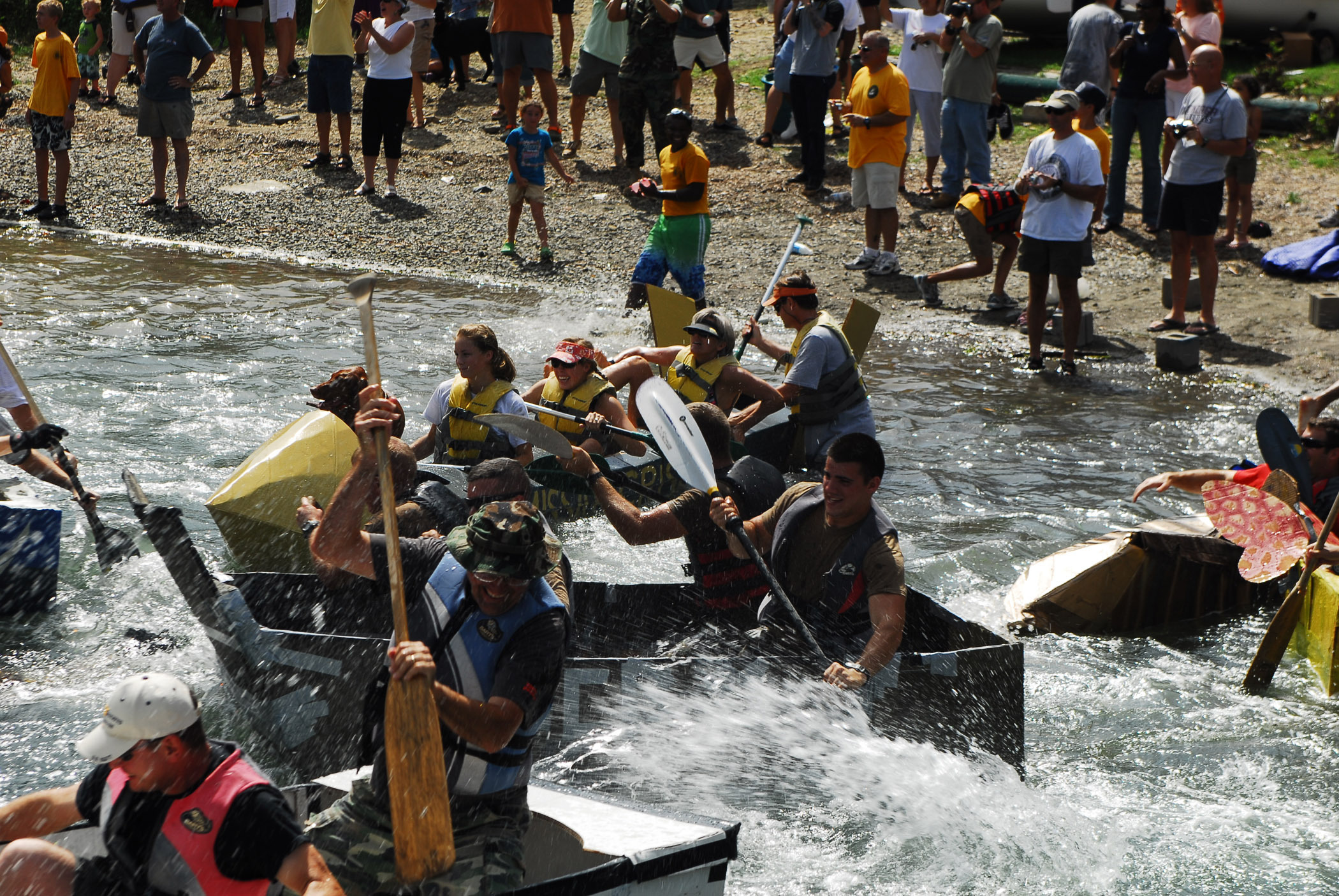
US Navy personnel paddling cardboard boats in Guantánamo Bay

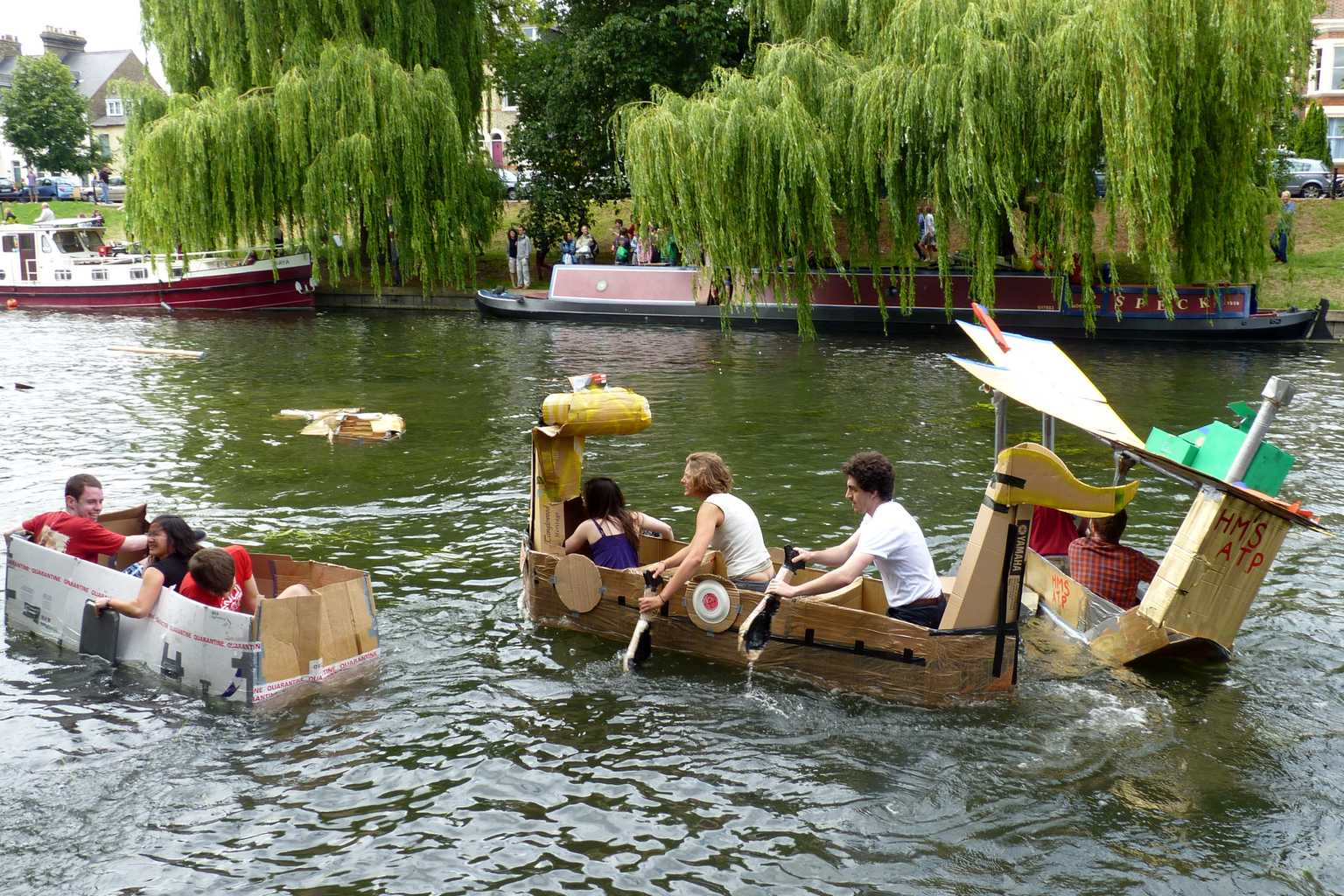
Some participants of the annual cardboard boat race on Suicide Sunday 2011 at the University of Cambridge.

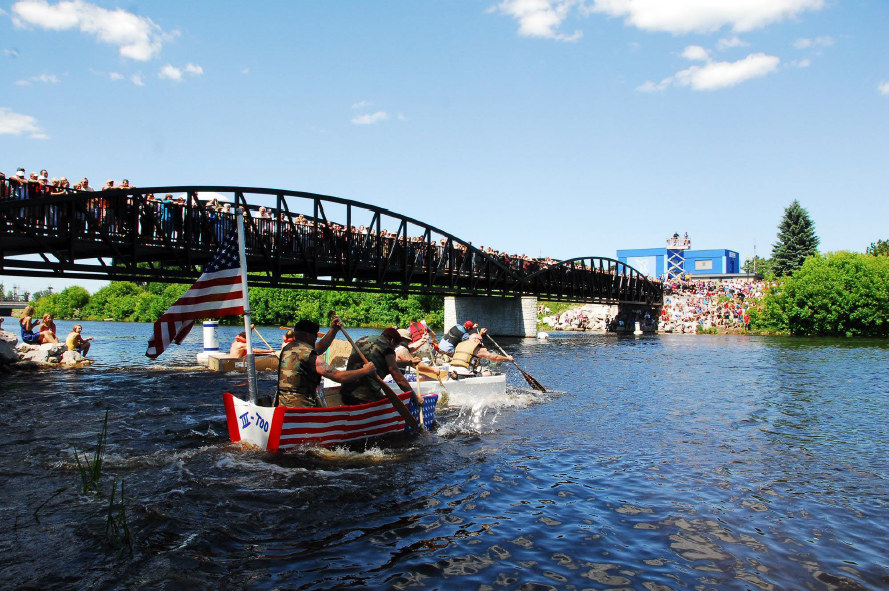
The 2011 running of the annual Cardboard Boat Regatta in Alpena, Michigan.

A cardboard boat race, sometimes known as a boat regatta, is a popular construction competition for people of all ages, with target audiences for competitions ranging from elementary-school students to college students and adults.

The earliest documented cardboard boat regatta was a class assignment created by Richard Archer at Southern Illinois University in 1974, and since then, the practice has only expanded, with an "International Cardboard Boat Regatta" occurring annually in New Richmond, Ohio.

According to an article published in the Middle School Journal, cardboard boat racing can be used as a way to get students interested in STEM fields by approaching an engineering challenge with "hands-on" learning.

== Boat Construction and Competition Rules ==
In a typical competition, competitors have to construct a boat under a fixed limit using only corrugated cardboard, glue, sheets, duct tape, and/or paint, although materials vary by competition. Some competitions are even more limiting, such as the New Richmond Annual Cardboard Boat Regatta, which only allows paint for waterproofing, and duct tape for construction, explicitly banning the use of glue or sheets.

Once teams have finished their boats, they race against one another, usually in a shallow pond, swimming pool, or river. The boats will almost always flood, sink, or shred under the weight however, mostly due to the difficulties of waterproofing cardboard.

In Rainy River, Ontario, races are held in two divisions each year with simple rules:

- Purist Classes: Team registration includes a supply of all materials used for boat construction. Contestants must build the boats and compete the same day.
- Open Classes: Boats can be constructed prior to Race Day using cardboard, duct tape, and additional adhesive components of the contestants' choosing. Suitably themed and costumed participants are encouraged to enter their creations in the Railroad Daze Parade.

== Cardboard Boat Museum ==
New Richmond, Ohio, is home to the world's "only cardboard boat museum". Based out of the town's "Springer House," the museum has been hosting the town's annual cardboard boat racing regatta since 1992. The museum is also the home to "Team Lemon," a team of experienced cardboard boat racers that support the museum.

The annual regatta takes place off the town's riverbank on the Ohio River and attracts "thousands of spectators" each year. The race is made up of a series of 14 heats and includes different categories for competitors of various age groups.

== See also ==
- Concrete canoe
