= ETS Piranhas =

École de technologie supérieure athletic teams

- University: École de technologie supérieure
- Association: U Sports
- Conference: RSEQ
- Location: Montreal, Quebec
- Varsity teams: 7 (2 men's, 1 women's, 4 co-ed)
- Arena: ÉTS Sports Centre
- Colours: Blue and Red
- Website: www.etsmtl.ca/satellite/piranhas
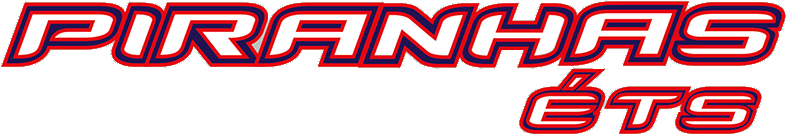

The ETS Piranhas are the athletic teams that represent the École de technologie supérieure of the Université du Québec, in Montreal, Quebec, Canada. They are members of the RSEQ.

== U Sports ==
The Piranhas were members of Canadian Interuniversity Sport from 2003 to 2006.

Beginning with the 2024–25 season, ETS is joining U Sports as a probationary member. Men's and women's cross country, men's and women's track and field and women's volleyball will compete in U Sports while badminton, golf, men's ice hockey, and men's rugby will continue to operate in the RSEQ Division 2.

== Varsity teams ==
Men's sports	Women's sports
Ice hockey	Volleyball
Rugby	
Co-ed sports
Badminton
Cross country
Golf
Track and field
