= Student competition =

Event where people compete using skill

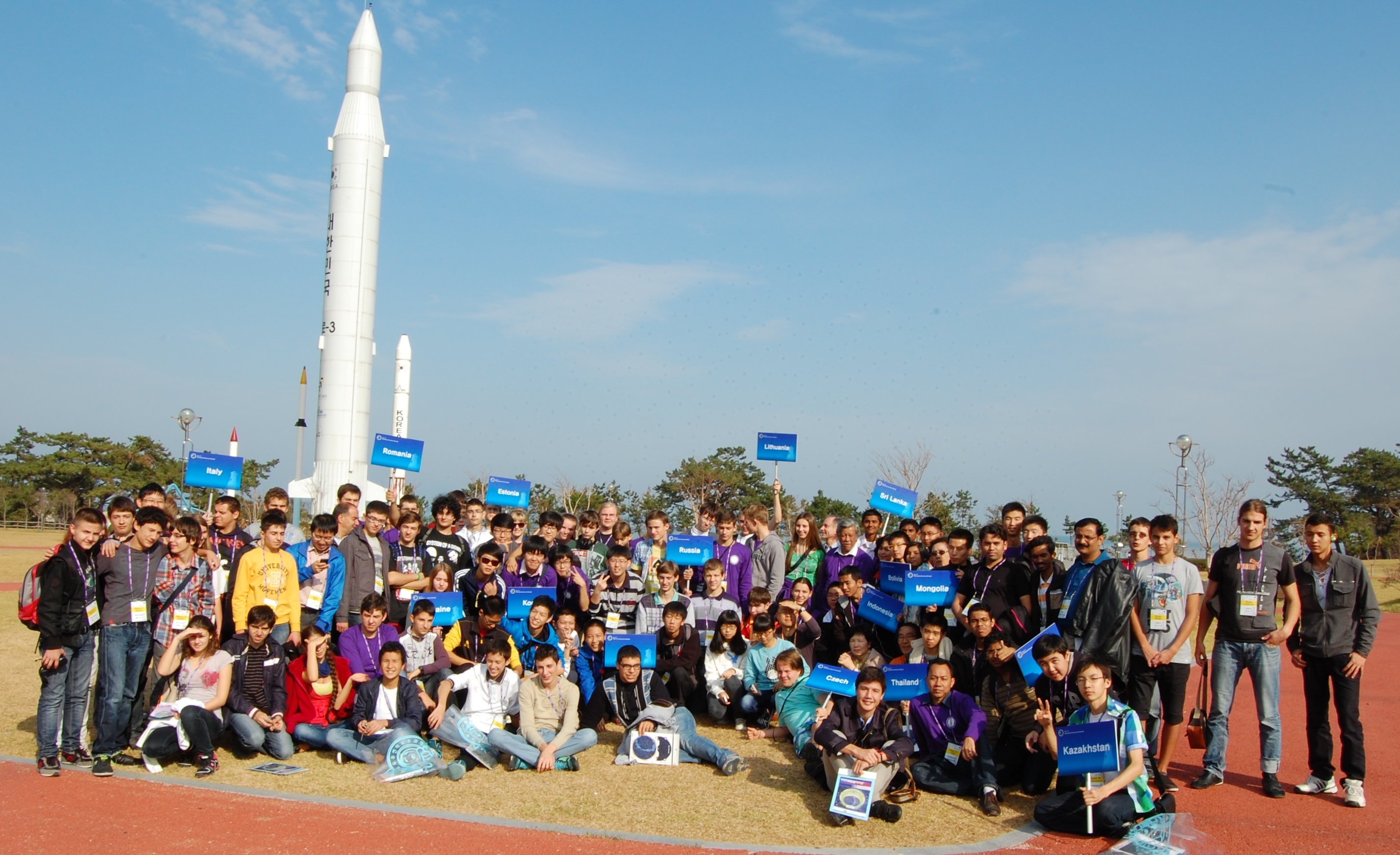
Participants of the 17th International Astronomy Olympiad in 2012 at the Naro Space Center in Korea.

A student competition is any student event where an individual or a team compete for a prize, where skill is the main predictor of the winner. There can be a competition between students or teams of students within a classroom or across different schools and across geographical regions. Student competitions help bring about a student's best effort by inspiring creativity and challenging the student to utilize their skills. Teachers incorporate student competitions as part of their curriculum to encourage students to stay on task and bring forward their best work by significantly increasing the ‘Payoff for the Student’ by providing:

- In-class marks towards final grades.
- The opportunity to put their creativity and skill set to the test by allowing them to show off their comprehensive knowledge of, for example, a software, hardware, or music technology item.
- An occasion to compare their skill levels and creativity with that of students across the world, as well as with their own local classmates.
- A chance at winning cash and other great prizes.

== Types of student competitions ==
Different types of student competitions exist:

1. Case study – This competition revolves around solving a real or imaginary case given to the competitors. The goal is to find a solution using the information provided in the case.
2. Business Plan – A competition for which a business plan needs to be written for either an existing or fictional business. Most entrepreneurship competitions will be of this form.
3. Design Competition – A Student Design Competition can be technical or purely aesthetic. The objective of technical competitions is to introduce students to real-world engineering situations and to teach students project-management and fabrication techniques used in industry. Aesthetic competitions usually require art and design skills.
4. Simulation – Students compete either online or via software simulating an environment in which decisions need to be made. These decisions and the outcomes are monitored to decide on the winner. Sometimes the whole event is online, and no physical location is given.
5. Ideation – A competition where ideas for different concepts are the main deliverables. The ideas may or may not be executed at a later time. Many competitions in which a semi-structured body of text needs to be delivered are considered in this category.
6. Olympiad – A competition based on exams to test the students' knowledge in one or more areas of knowledge, in a similar way to school exams. The topic, environment of application and awarding method of the exams may vary from olympiad to olympiad. Competitions like the IMO, the USAMO, the IPhO, and the IEO fall into this category.
7. Essay – Writing an essay (a short piece of writing) about a topic. Topics can vary and can be mandated or left to the writers’ discretion. The main deliverable is a body of text that is written in a specific form.

There are many student competitions running across the globe. Often, these competitions consist of students first competing with other students in their classrooms. The winners go on to regional competitions and finally on to national competitions.

== See also ==
- Investment Game
- Student design competition
