= Charles Bombardier =

Canadian engineer and investor

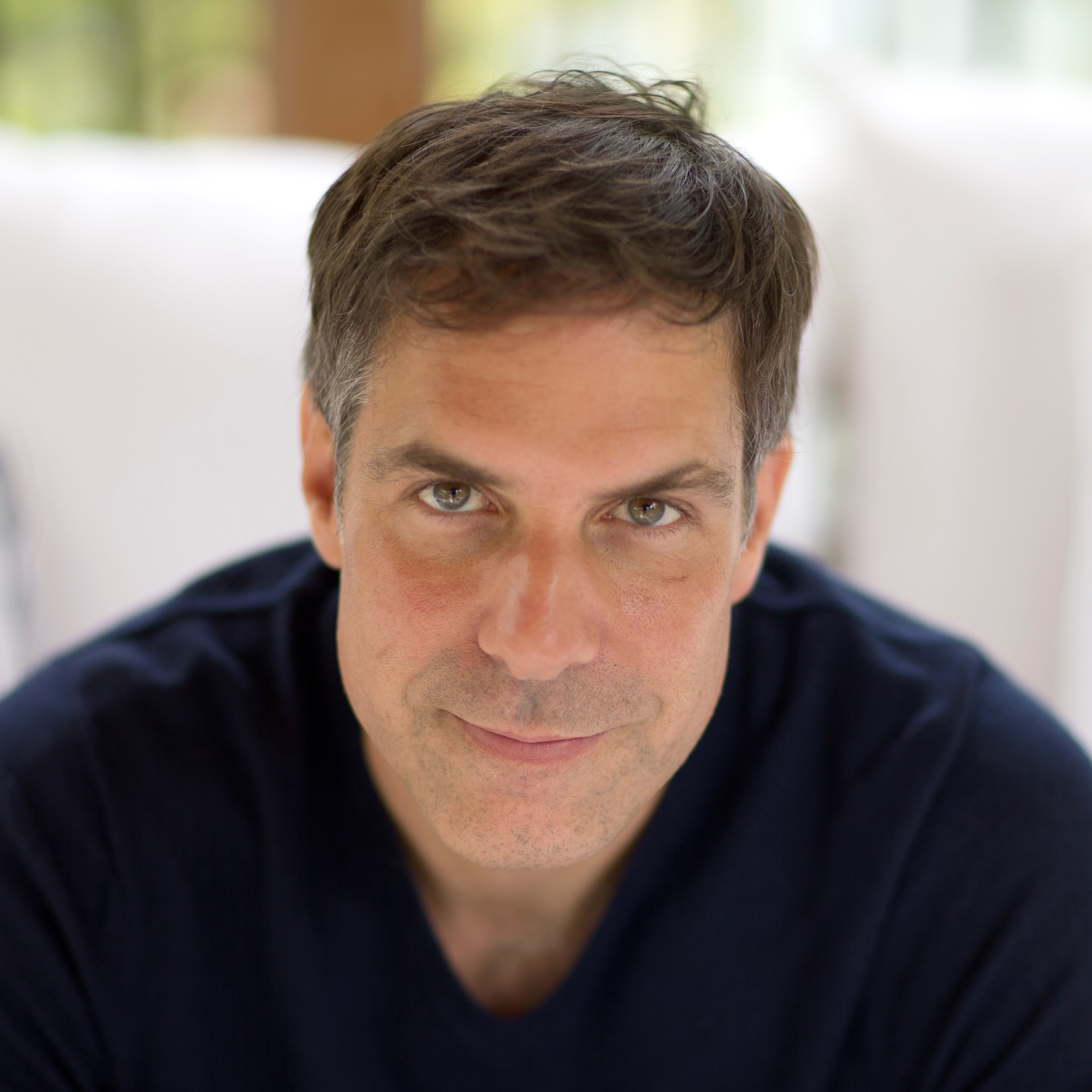
- Born: 1974 (age 51–52); Valcourt, Canada
- Occupations: Industrial designer, Entrepreneur

Charles Bombardier (born 1974) is a Canadian engineer and angel investor. His concept ideas have been noted in some news publications.

== Background ==
Charles Bombardier was born in Valcourt, Canada. Bombardier's grandfather was Joseph-Armand Bombardier, founder of Bombardier Inc. and inventor of the snowmobile. At age 16, Bombardier began working for his family's company on the Ski-Doo assembly line in Valcourt.

== Education ==
Bombardier first completed a technical degree at the CEGEP of Lévis-Lauzon in 1994. He then attended the École de technologie supérieure in Montreal, Quebec, where he received a bachelor's degree in mechanical engineering in 1998. In 2011, he completed a certificate in board governance from Laval University. Bombardier went on to complete a master's degree in applied science, writing his thesis on the subject of crowdfunding and innovation management. In 2017, he began his research and doctoral studies in engineering at the Université de Sherbrooke and completed it by the year 2024.

== Career ==
Bombardier began his career with Bombardier Recreational Products, where he managed various engineering teams, including the Bombardier Traxter XL ATV, the Elite Snowmobile by Ski-Doo and the Spyder roadster motorcycle by Can-Am. In 2008, Bombardier left the family business to create electric vehicle prototypes.

In 2013, Bombardier focused his research on the product ideation process. He began converting his ideas into design concepts related to the future of mobility. The Globe and Mail hired him soon after to start writing a weekly column.

He continues to invest with his family in Canadian startups and incubators. In 2016, he was named to the board of the Order of Engineers of Québec. Since May 2019, Charles Bombardier has served on the Board of Bombardier. Charles joined the Board of BRP in May 2020.

=== Concept designs ===
Bombardier began publishing his concepts in 2013. As of February 2019, he had published and shared over 325 concepts, ranging from recreational products to cars, boats, and aircraft. Each of his concepts includes a brief project description. Bombardier collaborates with industrial designers from around the world to convert his vision into 3D models and graphic images.

=== Skreemr and Antipode supersonic aircraft ===
The Skreemr and Antipode concepts depict two types of hypersonic passenger airliner concepts able to fly from New York to London in less than 11 minutes. Reusable rocket boosters would initially accelerate and propel the aircraft to Mach 5, after which, scramjets engines would take over and continue accelerating them up to Mach 24. An opening in the Antipode's nose would expel counter-flowing jets of air to cool the aircraft surface and reduce its sonic booms. This technology, dubbed long penetration mode (LPM), was inspired by a NASA study. Both concepts were featured in publications including Popular Mechanics, Architectural Digest, CNN and Forbes.

=== Seataci ===
The Seataci is a yacht concept that uses a biomimetic propulsion system resembling the movement of whale's tail. Its main hull would be lowered underwater, providing passengers with an excellent underwater view of the coral reefs and marine life. It features a dozen villas and two landing pads specially designed for personal flying drones. It received a lot of press around the world and appeared in Forbes, Business Insider and hundreds of other websites around the world.

=== The Solar Express ===
The Solar Express is a space train that would be designed and used to ferry humans, supplies and minerals between celestial bodies and space stations in the Solar System. It would run non-stop, so smaller vessels would need to catch the train when it passed by. It provides an artist's rendering of a Mars cycler spacecraft. The Solar Express concept generated of articles around the globe in several languages including Chinese, Arabic, German, Italian, and Russian.
