= NASA's Lunabotics Competition =

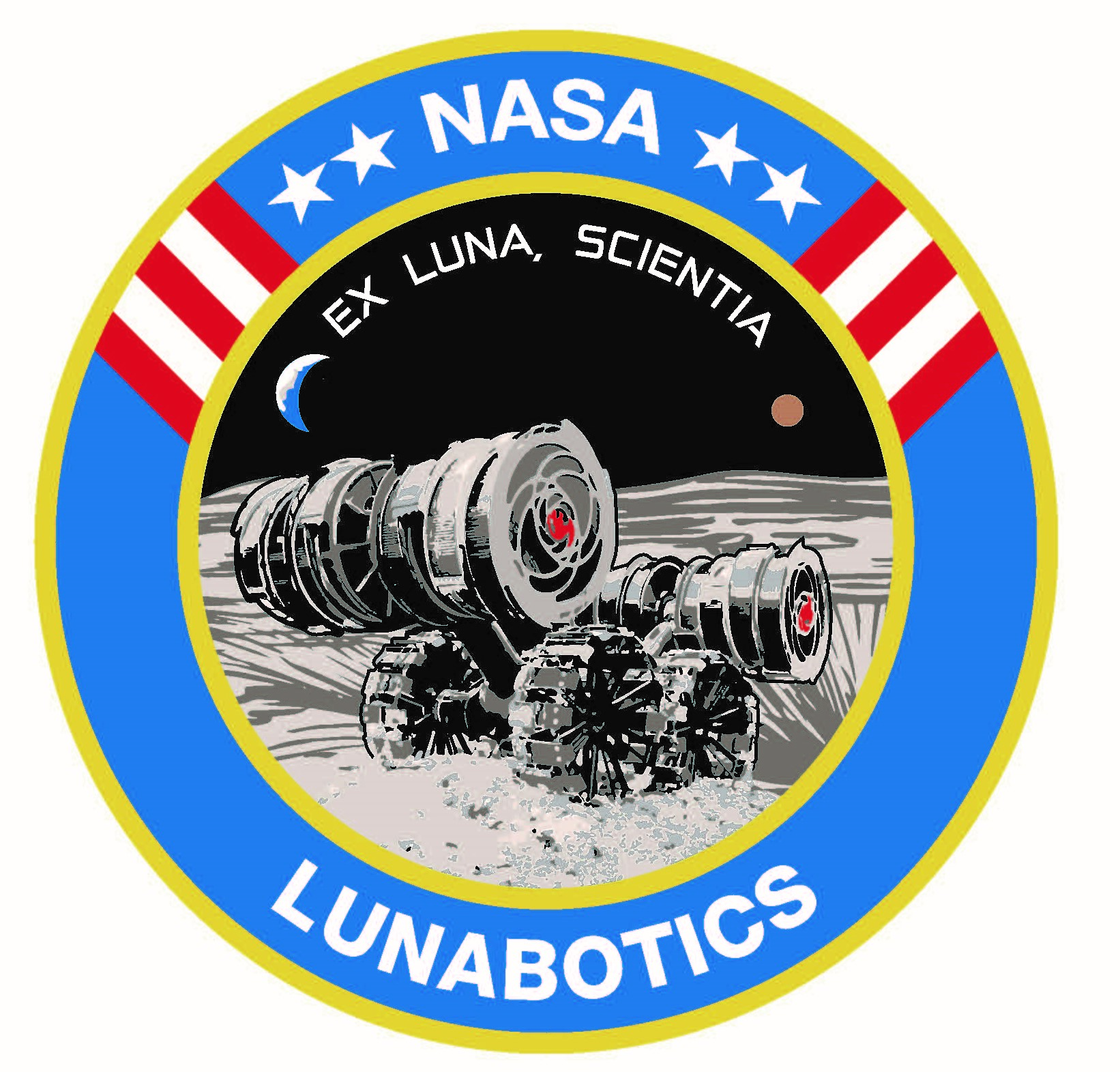
- Status: Active
- Genre: Student robotics competition
- Frequency: Annually
- Venue: University of Central Florida (Qualifying rounds), Kennedy Space Center Visitor Complex (Final)
- Country: United States of America
- Most recent: May 15–18, 2025
- Organiser: NASA
- Website: https://www.nasa.gov/learning-resources/lunabotics-challenge/

Since 2010, NASA's Lunabotics competition has provided college students from around the country an opportunity to engage with the NASA Systems Engineering process to design and build a robotic Lunar excavator capable of mining regolith and icy regolith simulants.

Some of the deliverables include a Project Management Plan, a Public Outreach Report, Presentations and Demonstrations, and a Systems Engineering Paper. The rules and rubrics evolve each year to account for changes to the Artemis Program mission objectives and advances in commercially available technology. The competition allows NASA to gather and evaluate design and operational data for future robotic excavators and builders. The complexities the robots will have to master are the abrasive characteristics of the regolith simulant, the resources required to excavate and construct, the weight and size limitations of the Lunar robot and the ability to operate by remote control (tele-operate) or through autonomous operations.

This is a two-semester, virtual challenge, designed to educate college students in the application of the NASA Systems Engineering process that may culminate with the design and build of a prototype Lunar robot. The events are as follows:

The Challenges

1. Project Management Plan

2. Systems Engineering Paper

3. Public Outreach Report

4. Presentation and Demonstration (optional)

5. Proof of Life Video

For more information see the Lunabotics Guidebook at https://www.nasa.gov/offices/education/centers/kennedy/technology/nasarmc.html

Why the Moon

The Moon was the first place beyond Earth humans tried to reach as the Space Age began in the late 1950s. More than 100 robotic explorers from more than half a dozen nations have since sent spacecraft to the Moon. Nine crewed missions have flown to the Moon and back. The former Soviet Union logged the first successes with its Luna program, starting with Luna 1 in 1959. NASA followed with a series of robotic Ranger and Surveyor spacecraft that performed increasingly complex tasks that made it possible for the first human beings to walk on the Moon in 1969. Twenty-four humans have traveled from the Earth to the Moon. Twelve walked on its surface. The last human visited the Lunar surface in 1972.

According to NASA, the challenge provides an annual opportunity to review student designs and data, complementing the agency's less frequent internal prototype evaluations. NASA states that the program may help identify ideas relevant to technical challenges associated with future Artemis missions. The agency has also said that advances in off-world mining and construction could have applications on Earth.

“Lunabotics is Good for NASA, Good for America, Good for All of Us”
