= Antipodean (disambiguation) =

Antipodean means belonging to the area diametrically opposite oneself on the Earth (the antipodes).

Antipodean may also refer to:

- A colloquial term for residents of Australasia, particularly of European descent, especially in Australia and New Zealand
- Antipodeans, an Australian artist group in the 1950s
- The Antipodean, an annual Australian literary magazine in the 1890s
