= École de technologie supérieure =

Engineering school in Montréal, Canada

Coordinates: 45°29′43.08″N 73°33′46.44″W

- École de technologie supérieure
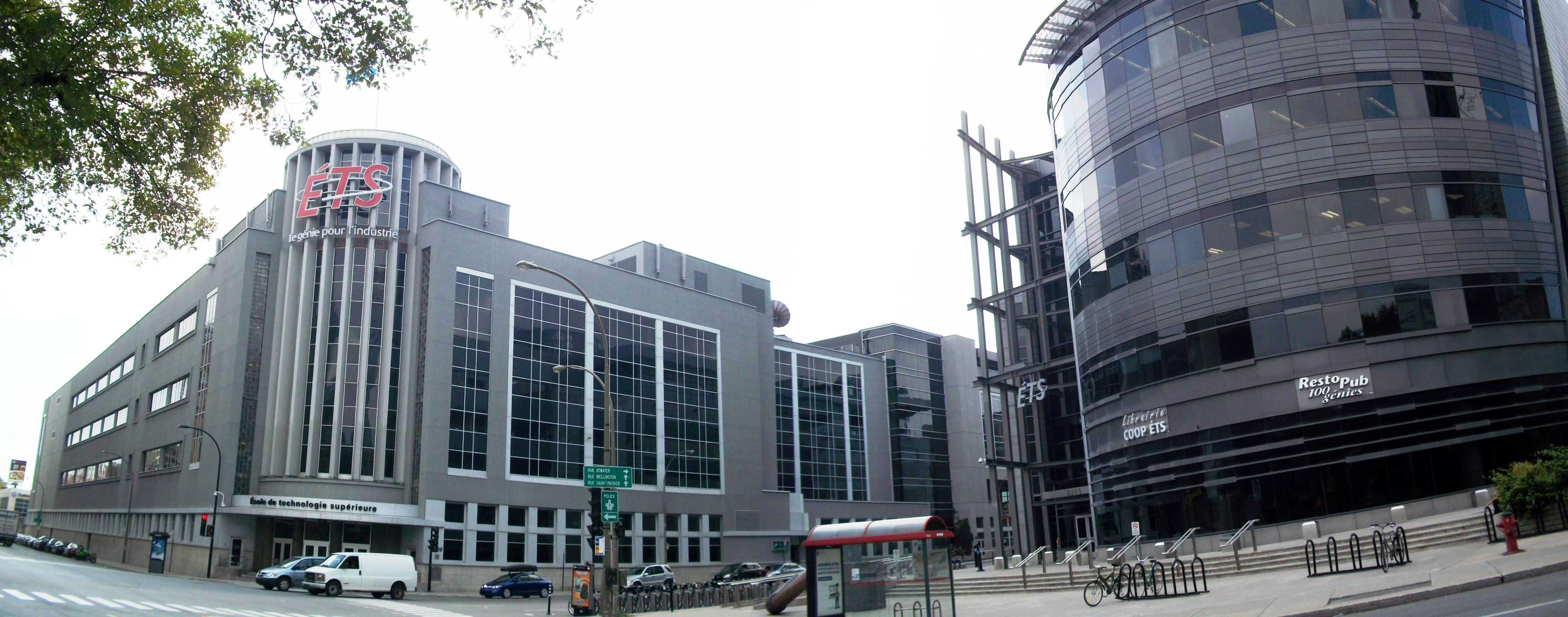
- Pavillons A and B
- Motto: Le génie pour l'industrie
- Motto in English: Engineering for Industry
- Type: Public
- Established: 1974; 52 years ago
- Parent institution: Université du Québec
- Affiliations: UACC, CIS, CEAB, QSSF, CBIE, CUP.
- Director: Kathy Baig
- Faculty: 260
- Total staff: 1,000
- Students: 11,000
- Undergraduates: 7,480
- Postgraduates: 3,180
- Location: Montreal, Quebec, Canada
- Campus: Urban
- Language: French (primary) and English
- Colours
- Nickname: ETS Piranhas
- Website: etsmtl.ca
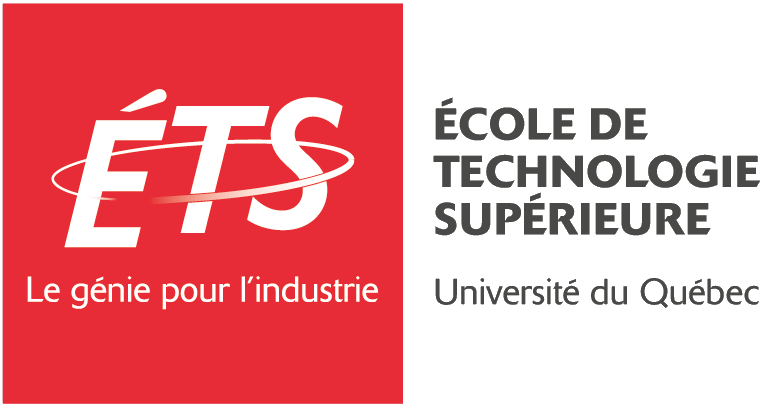

École de technologie supérieure (French pronunciation: [ekɔl də tɛknɔlɔʒi sypeʁjœʁ], Higher Technology School, ÉTS), founded in 1974, is a public research university in Montreal, Quebec, Canada and affiliated to the Université du Québec system. The school specializes in applied teaching and research in engineering as well as transferring advanced technologies to companies.

In any given year, 25% of all engineers receiving a diploma from an engineering school or faculty in the province of Quebec graduate from the ÉTS. The school ranks second in Canada for the number of bachelor's degrees in engineering awarded at the undergraduate level.

== Programs ==
The school features cooperative education in all of its undergraduate programs. The bachelor's programs have all been accredited by the Canadian Engineering Accreditation Board (CEAB). Each year, ETS graduates the largest number of engineers in Quebec and ranks second in Canada. Students can specialize in the following disciplines: Construction Engineering, Electrical Engineering, Computer Engineering, Software Engineering, Mechanical Engineering, Production Engineering, Industrial Engineering

The university also offers multiple research programs leading to Master's degree or Doctor of Philosophy. International graduate students come from all five continents, including, notably, France, Brazil, Mexico, India, and Iran. The main research fields are energy, environment, manufacturing, health technologies, enterprise systems, IT, microelectronics and telecommunications, aerospace manufacturing and avionics, project management, and innovation management.

The ETS student-run technical clubs participate in international competitions. The world's fastest human-powered submarine, Omer, was developed by one such club. An autonomous underwater vehicle named S.O.N.I.A., an unmanned aerial vehicle Dronolab, a walking robot, Eclipse solar-powered car, Chinook the world champion wind-powered vehicle, and others have won prizes in international competitions. The school also houses a concrete canoe club.

== History ==
ÉTS opened in 1974 on Rue Sainte-Catherine, in Montreal, and received 28 undergraduate students in technology (mechanics and electricity). The ÉTS Student Association (AEETS) was created the following year. In 1977, the diploma (B.Tech.) was awarded to the first 14 graduates. Bachelor's degrees in construction technology and automated production were added later on.

The first student club (Mini-Baja ÉTS) was created in 1989. The same year, ÉTS opened its first bachelor's degrees in engineering: construction engineering, mechanical engineering, electrical engineering, and automated production engineering. In 1990, they were accredited by the Canadian Engineering Accreditation Board (BCAPI). In 1991, the master's program (systems technology) was offered. The Center for Technological Entrepreneurship (Centech) was created in 1994. The same year, the students created the Student Grouping Program for International Cooperation (PRÉCI).

In 1998, ÉTS inaugurated the first student residences and several phases were added over the decades. The first doctoral degrees in engineering were awarded in 2000. The first research chair was created in 2001 (in wireless telecommunications). The same year, the Sports Center created the Les Piranhas club. In 2004, the Department of Software Engineering and Information Technology Engineering was opened and a new pavilion was inaugurated (Pavilion B). In 2007, a major expansion of the main pavilion was completed. In 2008, ÉTS adopted a sustainable development policy. Many study programs are added over the years, as well as student clubs.

In 2015, the campus expanded further with the opening of the Student House (Pavilion E). In 2018, the former Dow Planetarium was renovated, and the technology business accelerator Centech moved there. ÉTS adopts an urban development plan for the campus in order to integrate it harmoniously into the neighborhood. The Formula ÉTS student club is moving from the combustion engine to the electric motor starting in 2019. In 2020 a new pavilion was opened (Pavilion D). In 2021, ÉTS achieved carbon neutrality.

== Notable alumni ==
- Charles Bombardier, industrial designer, entrepreneur, and investor.
- Mathieu Lemay, Canadian politician.

== Campuses and facilities ==
The main address of ÉTS is 1100 Notre-Dame Street West in Montreal's Griffintown neighbourhood, the site of a former O'Keefe Brewery, which was transformed to house the school. It has four buildings (Pavillon A, B, D, and E) devoted to education programs and research activities. The buildings are connected through the underground tunnels.

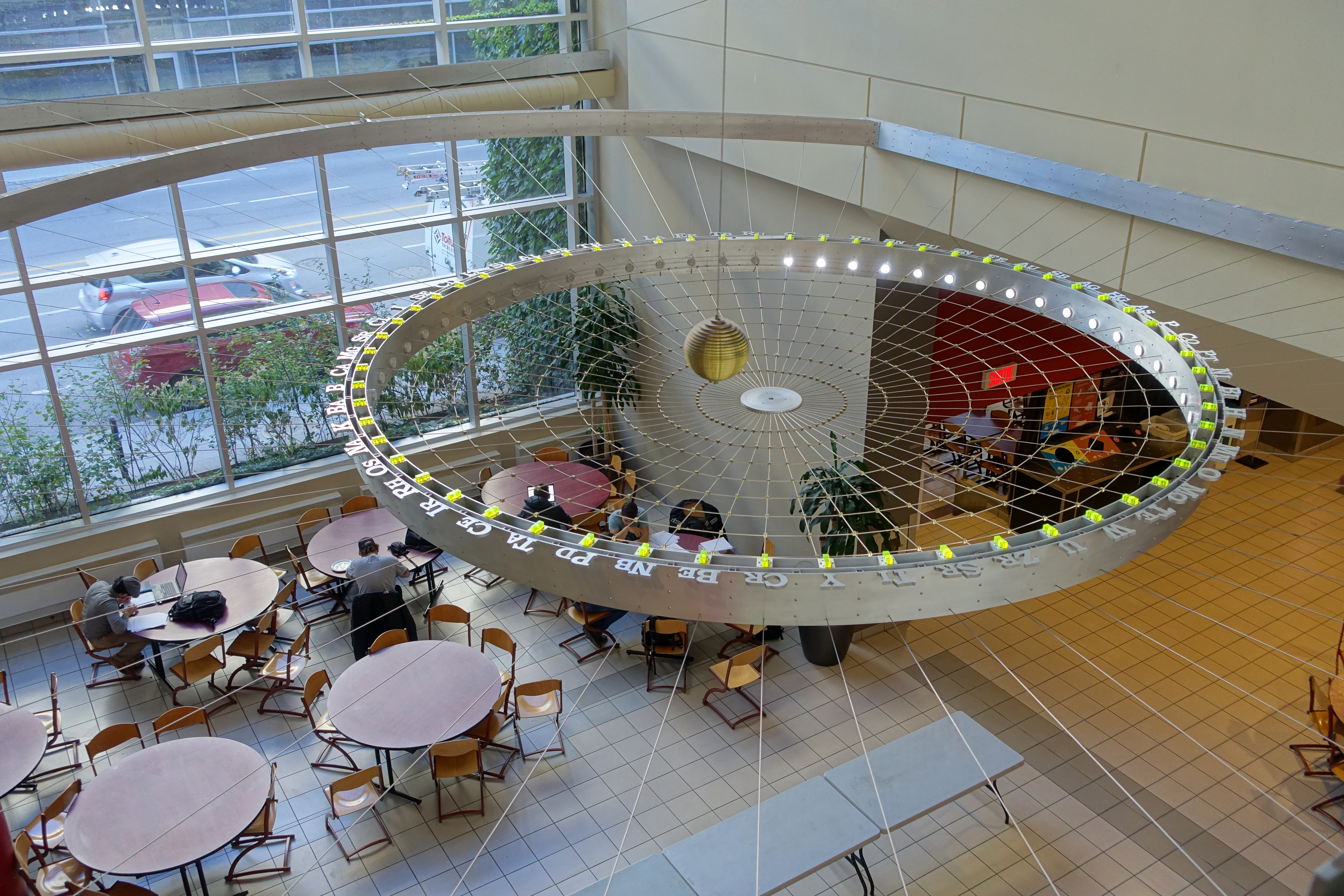
Pavillon A interior.

The facilities and offices within Pavillon A include the library, cafeteria, registrar's office, office of the dean of studies, Department of construction engineering, graduate students' lounge, facilities management department, Department of electrical engineering, department of mechanical engineering, office of international relations, department of systems engineering, department of software engineering and information technologies.

Pavillon B, located at 1111 Notre-Dame Street West contains Coop ÉTS, Le 100 Génies Resto-pub, IT service counter, Daycare Centre, General education department, and Sports centre.

Pavillon D, located at 1219 William Street contains AÉÉTS (student association), and student groups and organizations.

Pavillon E or Maison des étudiants, located on 1220 Notre-Dame Street West contains the office of student life, ÉTS Continuing Education, Co-Operative Education Department.

Centech, located at 1000 Saint-Jacques Street, is home to "Development of technology businesses".

INGO, located at 355 Peel Street, contains FDÉTS (ÉTS Development Fund).

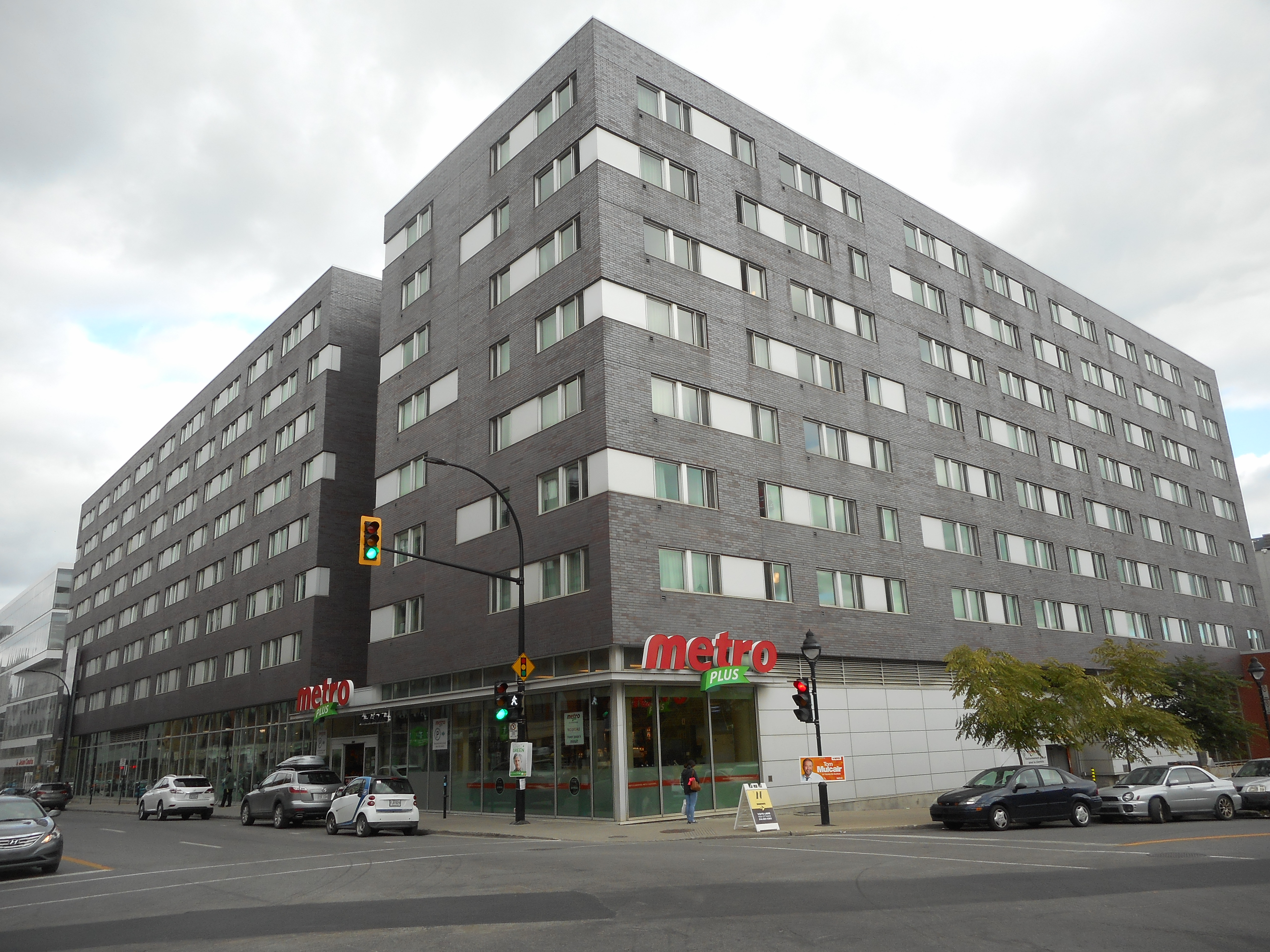
Residence phases 3 and 4

Located on 301-311 Peel Street and 1045-1055 Ottawa Street, phases 1 and 2 are the first two student residences built for ETS students. Phase 3 of the residences is located at 425 de la Montagne Street, and phase 4 is located at 355 de la Montagne Street. The Bureau du respect de la personne (Human Rights Office) of ETS is located in phase 4 of residences.

== Sports ==
The school is represented in Canadian Interuniversity Sport by the ETS Piranhas.

== Arms ==
Coat of arms of École de technologie supérieure

Notes
Granted 20 January 2023.
Escutcheon
Argent a piranha-swallow rising Azure embellished Argent and Gules enfiling an oval annulet, a base dancetty of three its peaks in chevron Gules.
Motto
De Génie Et D'Audace (Of Ingenuity And Audacity)
Badge
A plate charged with a piranha-swallow rising Azure embellished Argent and Gules, all within an annulet Gules inscribed with the Motto and charged in base with a fleur-de-lis Argent.

== See also ==
- Higher education in Quebec
- List of universities in Quebec
- Canadian Interuniversity Sport
- Canadian government scientific research organizations
- Canadian university scientific research organizations
- Canadian industrial research and development organizations
