= Chapel Hill High School (North Carolina) =

American public school in North Carolina

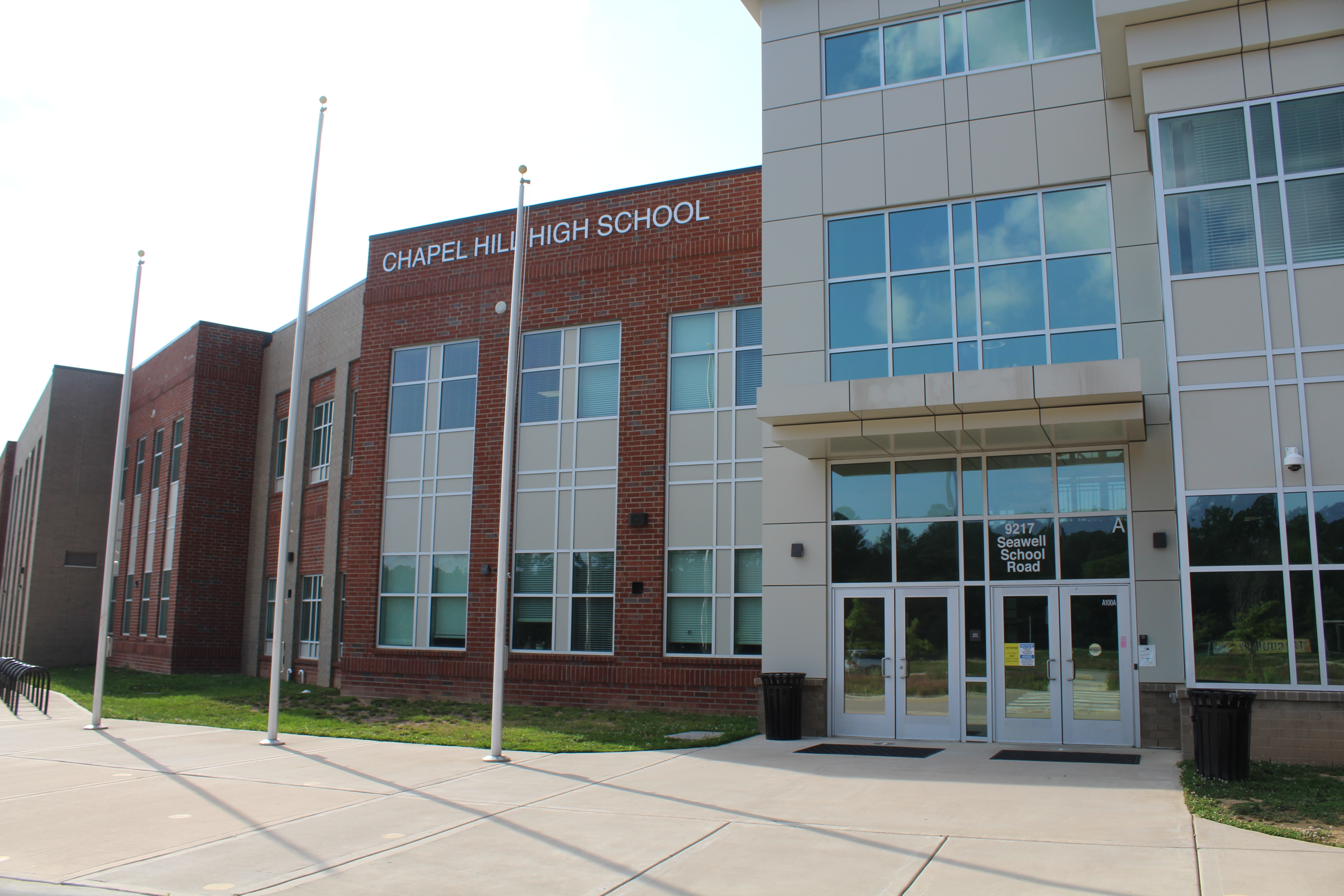
- Chapel Hill High School front entrance, June 2023

Location
- 9217 Seawell School Rd; Chapel Hill, North Carolina 27516; United States; 35°56′47″N 79°04′49″W

Information
- Type: Public
- Established: 1916 (110 years ago)
- School district: Chapel Hill-Carrboro City Schools
- CEEB code: 340645
- Principal: Patrick Greene (2026–present)
- Teaching staff: 100.85 (FTE)
- Grades: 9–12
- Gender: Coeducational
- Enrollment: 1,638 (2023-2024)
- Student to teacher ratio: 16.24
- Colors: Gold and black
- Mascot: Tiger
- Nickname: Tigers
- Accreditation: Southern Association of Colleges and Schools
- Newspaper: The Proconian
- Yearbook: Hillife
- Website: www.chccs.org/chhs
- References

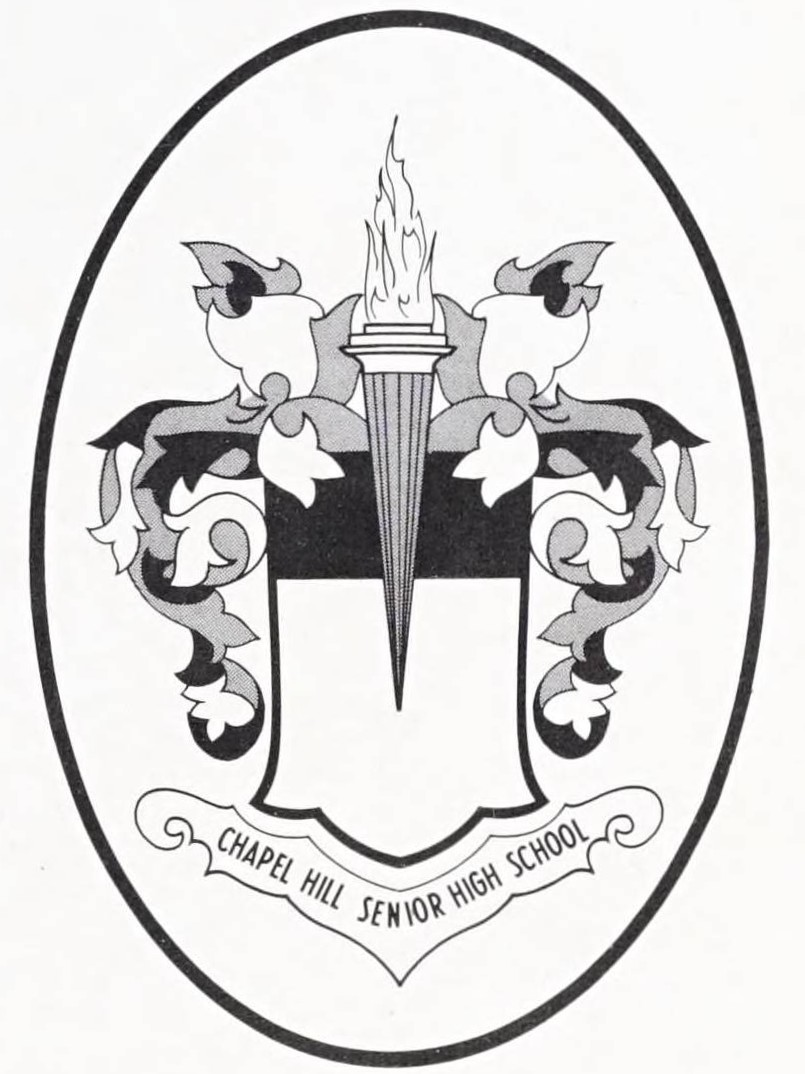
Chapel Hill Senior High School logo from 1966 Hillife yearbook

Chapel Hill High School is a public high school in Chapel Hill, North Carolina. It is located close to the University of North Carolina at Chapel Hill. Chapel Hill High School is part of the Chapel Hill-Carrboro City Schools district which contains two other high schools, Carrboro High School and East Chapel Hill High School.

== History ==
Chapel Hill High School's original school building was located on West Franklin Street, and housed the school for white students starting in 1916. That same year, Orange County Training School (which later became Lincoln High School), opened at 750 Merritt Mill Road for black students. In 1936, a new high school building for Chapel Hill High was constructed on Columbia Street, where the UNC Eshelman School of Pharmacy is now located. This school building burnt down in 1942, and wasn't rebuilt until after World War II. Classes would meet at various locations until a newly constructed school building opened back on West Franklin Street in 1947.

Chapel Hill High would remain at its West Franklin Street location until 1966. In 1966, a new high school building opened on High School Road, with Chapel Hill High merging with Lincoln High to form the new integrated Chapel Hill High School. Lincoln High School was known for its award-winning football and band programs. In particular, its 1961 football team won the NCHSAA state championship without a single point being scored against it all year, while averaging over 40 points per game.

On April 15, 2010, a student brought a gun on a school bus and accidentally shot it at the ground. No one was hurt, but the school and several nearby schools went on lockdown. The student was later arrested.

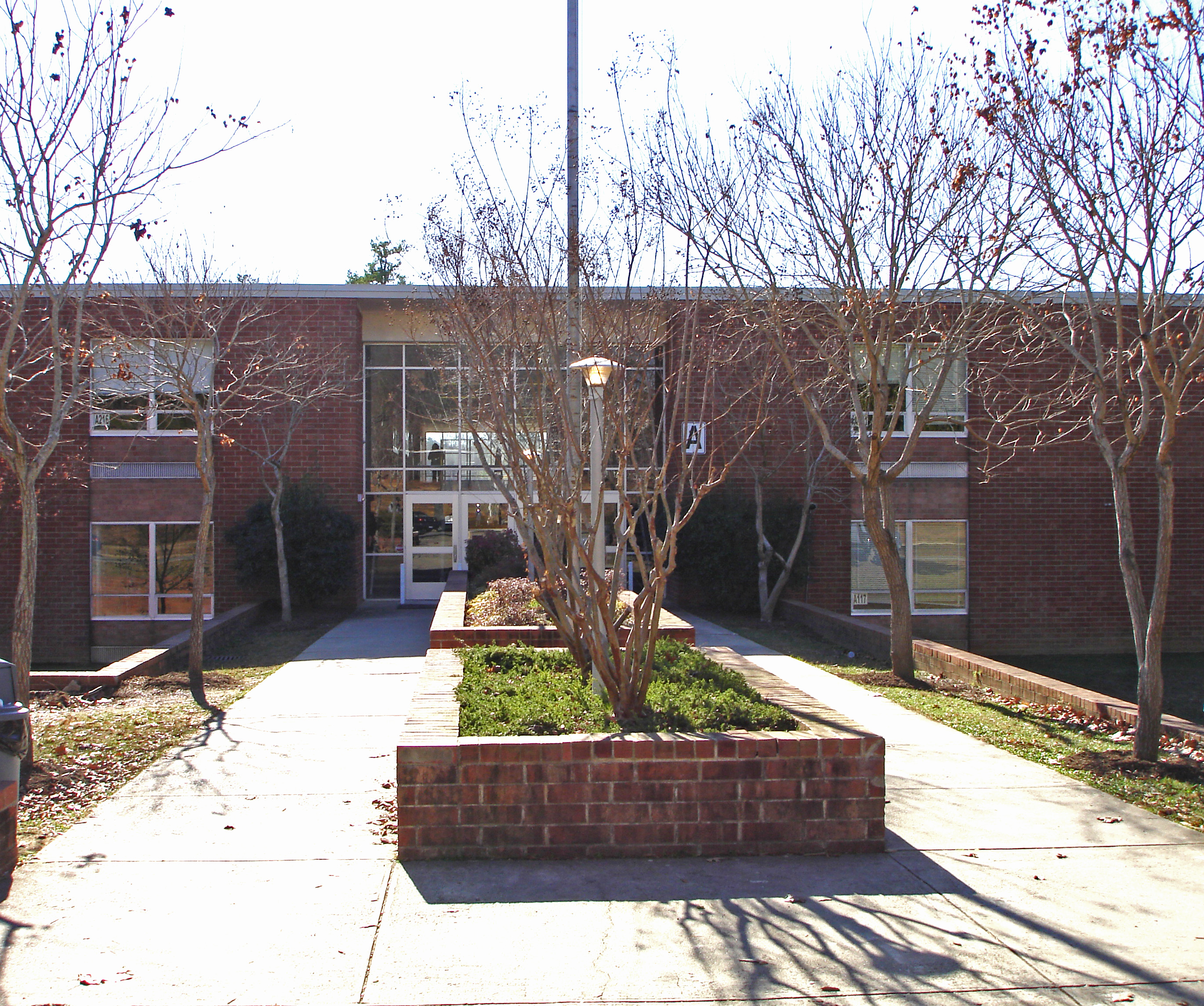
Old entrance of the school

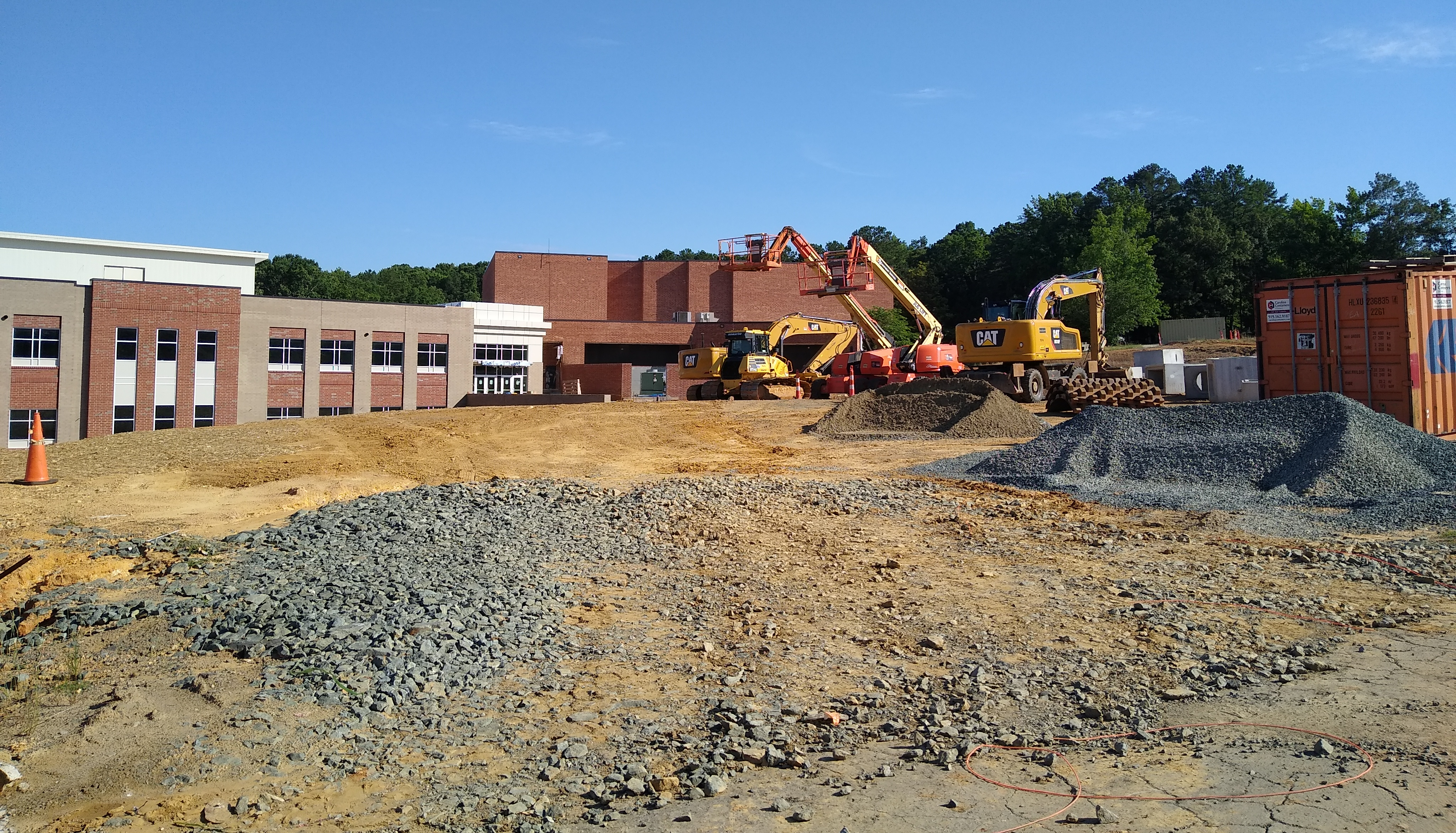
CHHS under renovation in summer 2020

In June 2018, construction began for a major ($70 million) renovation of Chapel Hill High, including the construction of new buildings. Construction was completed in August 2021.

== Academics ==
In 1999, Chapel Hill High School was listed as one of the top-performing U.S. high schools in The Wall Street Journal (October 15, 1999), for "the best student performance over the past 10 years based on SAT, achievement-test and standardized-test scores."

In 2005, 62.5% of students took the SAT and scored an average of 1156 compared to a state average of 1008. Similarly, 97.3% of the student body has taken the PSAT, and scored an average of 155 compared to the state average of 133. Also, 69.2% (306 students) have participated in Advanced Placement (AP) examinations with 73.5% of all scores scoring above a 3. As of 2005, Chapel Hill High School also has a high graduation rate of 94.7%. In 2005, 94.7% of students were proficient on State English I tests, and 93.1% of students were proficient on State Algebra I tests. The school posted the third highest average SAT score in the Raleigh Durham area: 1754 with 87.9% of students taking the test.

== Athletics ==
Chapel Hill High School has around 20 athletic teams. In the fall, the school offers cheerleading, cross country, field hockey, football, men's soccer, women's tennis, ultimate frisbee, volleyball, and women's golf. In the winter, the school offers cheerleading, men's basketball, women's basketball, swimming and diving, and wrestling. In the spring, the school offers men's golf, men's lacrosse, women's soccer, softball, men's tennis, track, baseball, and women's lacrosse.

Chapel Hill High School has won many state championships in athletics such as back to back trophies in the 3A Men’s Soccer in 2017 and 2018; their 3A Women’s Soccer program winning in 2018, tying the state record for number of goals allowed with 2; and their 3A Men's cross country program winning back-to-back championships in 2019 and 2020.

== The arts ==
Chapel Hill High has performing and visual arts programs. The school offers band, orchestra, drama, dance, and chorus classes. It has an award-winning marching band and critically-acclaimed theatre department.

== Robotics team ==
Students from Chapel Hill High school have operated a FIRST Robotics Competition team since 2013 called the Titanium Tigers. The robotics team, number 4829, was notable for ranking second in the North Carolina Championship in the 2022 season, going on to play in the Roebling division of the annual FIRST Championship. The school hosted two off-season events, THOR 3 and Doyenne Inspiration, with the school's team co-winning both events, along with the team of East Chapel Hill High School.

In the 2023 season, their competing robot was named Charles, after Charles Blanchard, the former principal who retired during competition season.

== Notable alumni ==
- Bill Ransom Campbell, modernist architect
- Anna Clendening, singer, actress, and internet personality
- Tristin Colley, distance runner
- Harold Covington (1971), white nationalist author and National Socialist Party of America (NSPA) leader
- Jamie Dell, professional soccer player
- Hampton Dellinger, attorney
- Sarah Dessen (1988), young adult novelist
- Dovonte Edwards, former NFL cornerback
- Valerie Foushee, U.S. representative from North Carolina since 2023
- Clark Gregg, actor who played Phil Coulson in the Marvel Cinematic Universe
- Meredith Hagner (2005), actress
- Bernardo Harris, former NFL linebacker and Super Bowl XXXI champion with the Green Bay Packers
- Alexander Julian, clothing designer
- Alex Kerr (2019), soccer player
- Gina Kim (2018), LPGA golfer
- Estelle Lawson, amateur golfer
- Mick Mixon, play-by-play radio announcer for the Carolina Panthers
- Mia Oliaro (2023), soccer player for the Duke Blue Devils
- Brian Roberts, two-time All-Star MLB player with the Baltimore Orioles
- Henrik Rödl, professional basketball player and basketball coach
- Clifford Skakle, former professional tennis player
- Scott Speiser, actor and writer
- Josh Stein, former state senator and current Governor of North Carolina
- Matt Stevens, former NFL safety and Super Bowl XXXVI champion with the New England Patriots
- Tauren "Strick" Strickland, rapper
- Ben Strong, professional basketball player and basketball coach
- David Taylor, former NFL offensive tackle
- James Taylor (attended until mid-junior year), singer-songwriter and guitarist
- Livingston Taylor, singer-songwriter and folk musician; younger brother of James
