= Smith Middle School =

Smith Middle School may refer to:

- Smith Middle School (Chapel Hill-Carrboro, North Carolina)
- Smith Middle School (Fort Hood, Texas)
- Eric Smith Middle School in Ramsey, New Jersey
