= Chapel Hill-Carrboro, North Carolina =

Chapel Hill-Carrboro is a city-sized urban area in Orange County, North Carolina consisting of:

- Carrboro
- Chapel Hill
- University of North Carolina at Chapel Hill

Chapel Hill-Carrboro may also refer to:

- Chapel Hill-Carrboro City Schools, the local school district
