= Ben Strong =

Ben Strong may refer to:

- Benjamin Strong Jr. (1872–1928), American banker
- Ben Strong (basketball) (born 1986), American basketball coach and player
