= Disappearance of Sydney West =

Unresolved 2020 vanishing of 19-year-old California student

Sydney Kaitlyn West, a 19-year-old student at the University of California, Berkeley, disappeared near the Golden Gate Bridge in San Francisco, California, on September 30, 2020. West was last captured on surveillance footage walking toward the bridge amid heavy fog and wildfire smoke. The case remains unresolved.

Any tips or sighting can be reported here: https://sydproofoflife.com/

== Background ==
Sydney Kaitlyn West was born on July 11, 2001. She grew up in the San Francisco Bay Area and attended Foothill High School (Pleasanton, California) before her family relocated to North Carolina in 2017. She graduated from Carrboro High School in Carrboro, North Carolina, where she played volleyball. After taking a gap year, she moved back to California in late August 2020 to attend summer sessions at UC Berkeley as a freshman. Due to a concussion she sustained the summer of 2020 and disruptions from the COVID-19 pandemic, she deferred her enrollment at UC Berkeley until Fall 2021. At the time of her disappearance, she was living with family friends in the Bay Area. The San Francisco Police Department noted that West was considered at risk due to depression.

West was a white female, 5 feet 10 inches tall, weighing 130 pounds, with blue eyes and blonde or light brown hair. She was last seen wearing a teal or blue hoodie or sweatshirt, dark leggings or shorts, and slip-on Vans sneakers, possibly with a tropical print, and carrying a black backpack, with her hair in a bun and possibly wearing eyeglasses.

== Disappearance ==
On the evening of September 29, 2020, West had a lengthy phone conversation with her father. The next morning, around 6:45 a.m., she took a ride share to Crissy Field, a park adjacent to the Golden Gate Bridge she often visited to walk or run. Surveillance footage showed her walking eastbound toward the bridge before vanishing into dense fog and smoke from regional wildfires. The bridge was crowded. There has been no activity on her phone, bank accounts, or social media since that morning. A family member reported her missing to authorities on October 1, 2020, with the case transferred to the SFPD.

=== Investigation and awareness campaign ===
The SFPD issued a public appeal on October 2, 2020, seeking information and describing West as at risk due to depression. Searches focused on the bridge area. Dozens of tips were received in the initial months. West's family hired private investigator Scott Dudek to pursue leads. By early 2021, they offered a $10,000 reward for information leading to her safe return, later increased to $25,000. Cyclists rode to bring awareness to West's disappearance. Her story was featured on Disappeared.
