= East Chapel Hill High School =

American public school in North Carolina

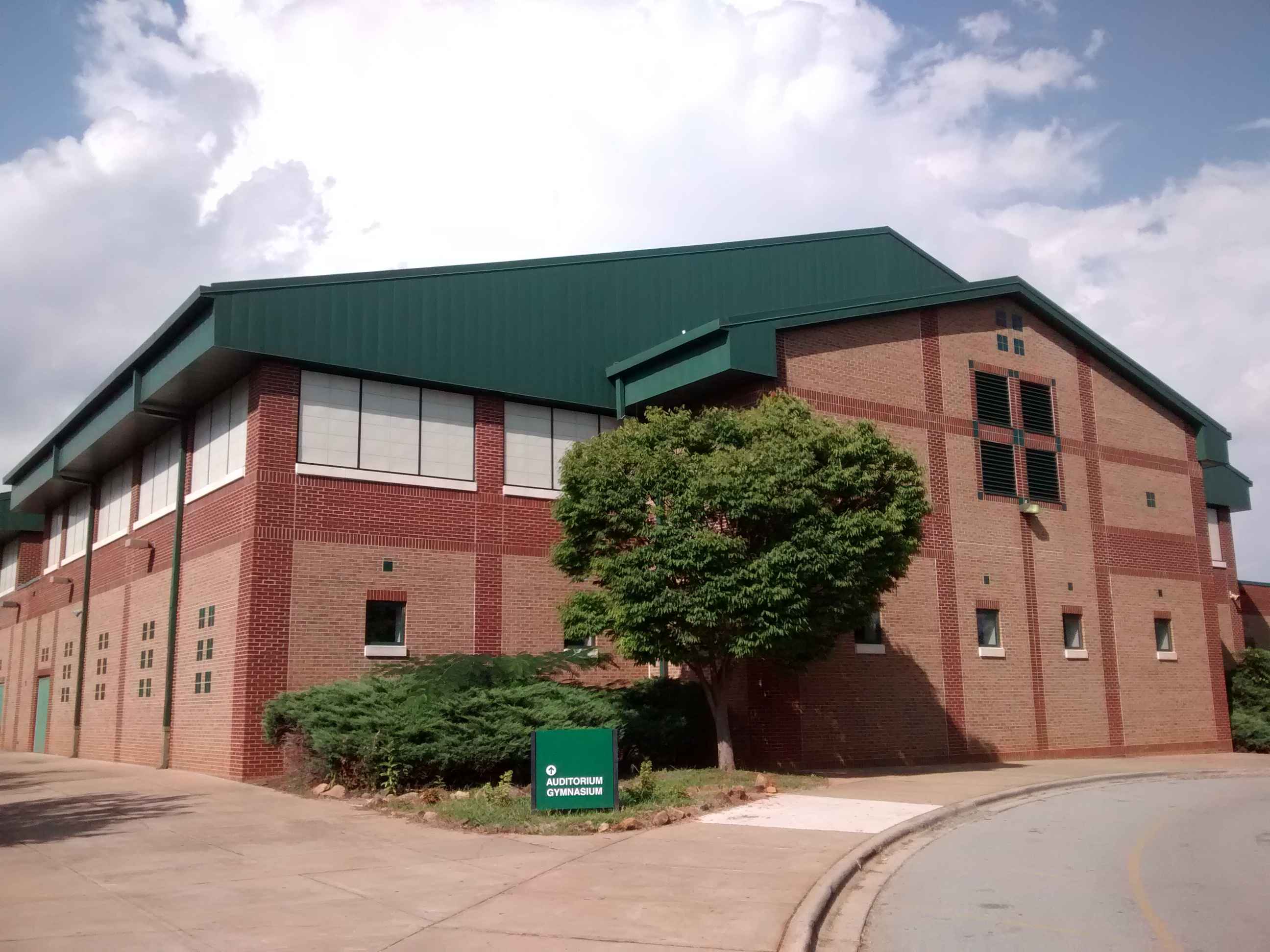

Location
- 500 Weaver Dairy Road; Chapel Hill, North Carolina 27514; United States
- 35°57′39″N 79°01′45″W

Information
- Type: Public
- Motto: "Loved, Respected & Connected"
- Established: August 20, 1996 (29 years ago)
- School district: Chapel Hill-Carrboro City Schools
- CEEB code: 340646
- Principal: Jesse Casey
- Faculty: 86.95 (on an FTE basis)
- Grades: 9–12
- Gender: Co-educational
- Enrollment: 1,419 (2024–25)
- Student to teacher ratio: 16.32
- Colors: Black, silver, and Carolina Blue
- Mascot: Wildcat
- Rival: Chapel Hill High School
- Accreditation: Southern Association of Colleges and Schools
- National ranking: 88th (Newsweek)
- Newspaper: ECHO
- Yearbook: Eurus
- Website: www.chccs.org/echhs
- All data from school website/handbook.

East Chapel Hill High School is a public high school in Chapel Hill, North Carolina. It is the second high school of the Chapel Hill-Carrboro City Schools district, which also contains Chapel Hill High School and Carrboro High School. The total enrollment in the 2025–2026 school year was 1,411 with 52% minority students.

Although East previously ranked within the top 100 of American public high schools on U.S. News, reaching as high as #23, it has not appeared on the list since the 2009–2010 school year due to being disqualified by achievement gaps. In 2012, it ranked #88 in Newsweek's "America's Best High Schools 2012."

== Academics ==
East is a highly competitive school in which students typically score above the national average on standardized tests. In the 2010 school year, the median weighted GPA was 3.91, and the median SAT score was 1809, compared to the state average of 1485. Also, 614 students participated in Advanced Placement (AP) examinations with 79% of all scores above a 3. The school scored the 2nd highest average SAT score in the Raleigh Durham area (behind Raleigh Charter High) in 2012, with 141 students taking the test and scoring an average of 1858. In 2010, the average was also 1858.

=== Competitions ===
East has consistently performed strongly in academic competitions. In both 2009 and 2010, East was a finalist in the International Space Settlement Design Competition. East also placed 1st in both 2011 and 2012's North Carolina Ethics Bowl competitions, and both 1st and 2nd in 2013 and 2014 North Carolina Ethics Bowl and 1st in 2014 Ethics Bowl Nationals. In 2012, East hosted the first North Carolina tournament for the National History Bee and Bowl, in which East teams placed 1st in both Junior Varsity and Varsity divisions, and the 1st and 2nd places in the Varsity division Bee went to East players.

At the 2012 NAQT high school national championship tournament, East tied for 13th place overall in the playoffs, with individuals ranked 31st and 43rd. Two members were also named to the North Carolina All-Star Team, which placed 7th overall in the 2012 NASAT. East finished with a year-end ranking of 14, the highest of any team from North Carolina. In 2013, East tied for 8th place in the HSNCT, with an 11th ranked individual.

In 2016, East claimed the national championship title for High School Fiscal Challenge. Due to their radical, left-leaning proposal, including a financial transactions tax, creating an aggressive estate tax, cutting agricultural subsidies, and shrinking the defense budget, the Koch Foundation pulled its funding from the competition. Fiscal Challenge has not hosted a national high school competition since.

East's Speech and Debate Team has claimed several national placements across events, including Congressional, Public Forum, Lincoln Douglass, and Policy Debate. East's Model United Nations team frequently wins national titles at university conferences, including DUMUNC (Duke University), MUNCH (UNC Chapel Hill), and ILMUNC (Ivy League).

== Demographics ==
According to 2014–2015 school statistics, 53% of the school's student body is white, 11% is African American, 11% is Hispanic, and 19% is Asian. 48% of the student body is male and 52% is female. Over the same time period, out of a total of 1411 students 27.1% (383 students) were in the 9th grade, 24.7% (349 students) were in the 10th grade, 24.2% (342) were in the 11th grade and 23.9% (337 students) were in the 12th grade. There were a total of 86 teachers, making for a 1:16 ratio of teachers to students.

== Athletics ==
Athletic programs make up a large part of student life at East, and East's teams have been highly competitive and successful every year since the school's inception in 1996. East fields teams in sports across the board. Fall sports include: football, men's soccer, women's tennis, field hockey, volleyball, cheerleading, women's golf, and men's and women's cross country. Winter sports include: men's and women's swimming and diving, men's and women's basketball, wrestling, cheerleading, and men's and women's indoor track and field. Spring sports include men's tennis, baseball, softball, men's and women's track and field, men's golf, women's soccer, and men's and women's lacrosse.

East's women's tennis team won seven consecutive 3A state championships from 1998 to 2004. In 2005, Sports Illustrated named East Chapel Hill the best sports high school in North Carolina. In the spring of 2008, the men's tennis team won the 4A state championships. The women's lacrosse program has won four state championships in six appearances since the program's inception, including three consecutive titles from 2002 to 2004; the most recent state title was won in 2013. In the fall of 2015, the field hockey team won the NCFHA State Championship for the eighth year in a row but finished fourth in their 2016 season, losing to rival Chapel Hill High School. The East men's lacrosse program has also won 2 state championships and was runner-up three times in the past ten years.

The mascot is the Wildcat, in keeping with the school system's theme of big cats for high school mascots.

The school has a rivalry with the nearby Chapel Hill High School.

== Alumni association ==
Proposals for the creation of an alumni association for East began in the fall of 2007. These efforts took off in 2009 with the drafting of organizational bylaws, the creation of a Board of Directors, and the launching of their website.

== Hostage crisis ==
On April 24, 2006, eighteen-year-old student W. B. Foster held teacher Lisa Kukla and a student hostage with a shotgun, a hunting knife, and a pistol in the school's "Lower Quad C" hall. After more than an hour, Lisa Kukla was able to talk Foster out of harming her or the student. Instead, Foster fired a shot through the window and fled, but was later turned in to the police. It's unknown why Foster held those two hostage, since he was never taught by Kukla, and didn't seem to know the student. In June 2007, Foster was sentenced to five years of probation because his attorneys said he had schizophrenia.

== Notable alumni ==
- Lindsey Shockley '99, comedy writer, producer and improviser best known for her work on HBO's Hello Ladies and ABC's Blackish
- David Gura '02, correspondent for NPR; former anchor and correspondent for MSNBC and NBC News
- Anoop Desai '04, American Idol season 8 top six finalist
- Michelle Kasold '05, Olympic field hockey striker
- Antonio Sales '07, track and field sprinter
- Ryan Watts '08, Democratic Nominee for the United States House of Representatives in North Carolina's 6th Congressional District (2018)
- Nick McCrory '09, bronze medalist in synchronized diving at the 2012 Summer Olympics
- Ben Griffin '14, professional golfer who plays on the PGA Tour
