= International Space Settlement Design Competition =

Annual space colony design competition

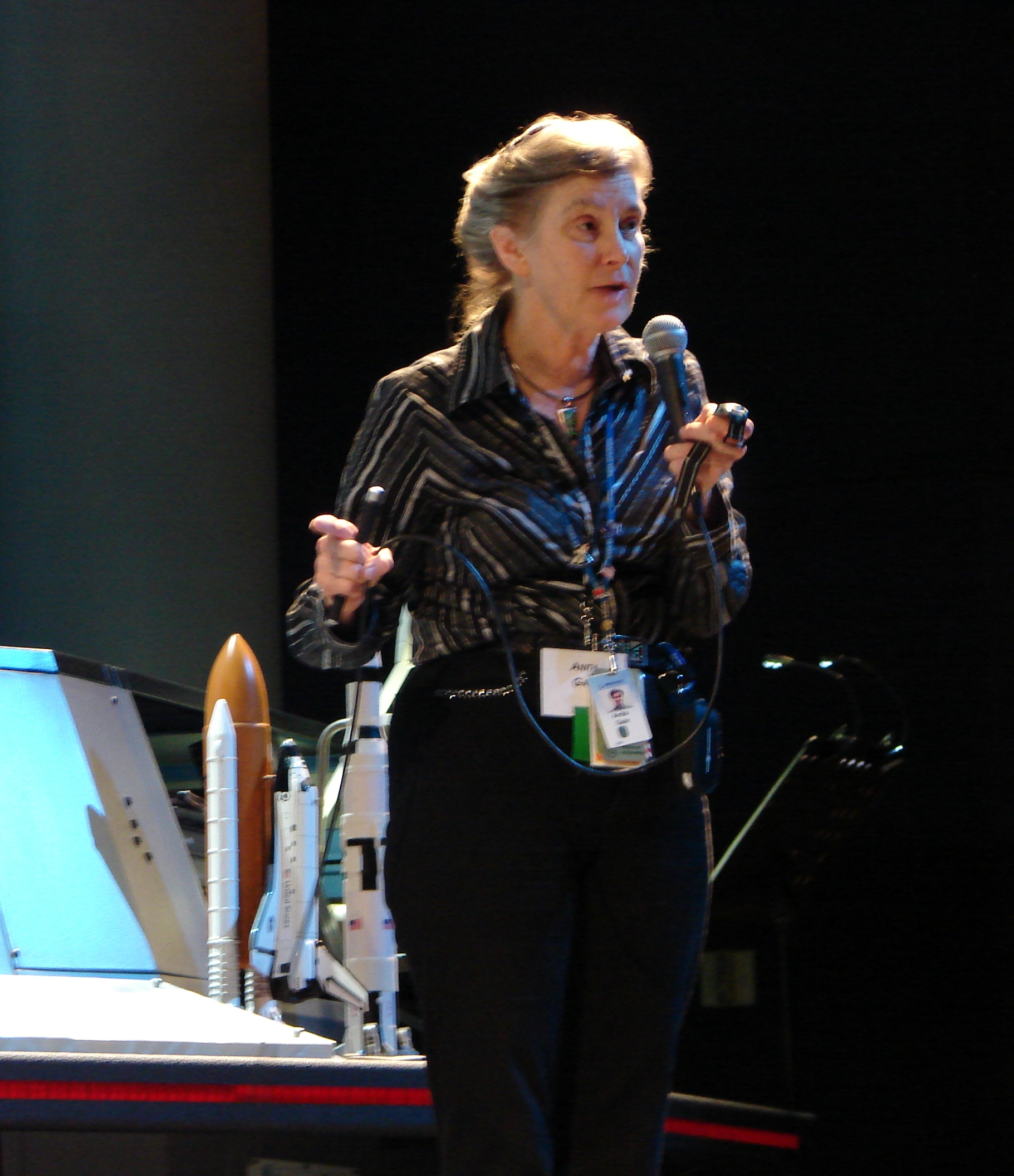
Anita Gale, founder of the International Space Settlement Design Competition

The International Space Settlement Design Competition, more commonly known as "SpaceSet", "ISSDC" or "Inters", is an annual competition founded by Anita Gale, Dick Edwards, and Rob Kolstad. The competition is supported by various Aerospace, Engineering, and Education organizations, including NASA. The competition is for high school students and simulates the experience of working on an aerospace company's proposal team. The teams, known as 'companies', are asked to design a space colony to fulfill a Request for Proposal (RFP).

== History ==
In 1983, when plans were being made by the Boy Scouts of America for the 1984 National Exploring Conference, the steering group for the Science and Engineering Cluster were looking to include an event related to space. Evelyn Murray, from the Society of Women Engineers, knew Anita Gale, who worked on the Space Shuttle program. Letters followed, recommending and expanding ideas, and concluding with a telephone call between Gale in California and Rob Kolstad (a member of the steering group) in Texas. They brainstormed and created the basic structure of the event to be both a design competition and a management simulation game. Gale and Dick Edwards wrote the materials for the game. The first Space Settlement Design Competition was conducted at Ohio State University in August 1984, with approximately 75 participants. The event proved highly successful. Astronaut Story Musgrave stopped by to watch design presentations.

The Explorers' Science and Engineering Cluster (headed by Brian Archimbaud) was impressed by this event and it was decided to ensure it would continue in some form. Dr. Peter Mason and the Space Exploration Post at NASA's Jet Propulsion Laboratory in Pasadena, California, agreed to try the format at a local level. The first SpaceSet (name proposed by Nathan Hawkins from the Space Exploration Post) was held in 1986. Eighteen SpaceSet competitions were conducted at JPL, with continuing participation by Anita Gale, Dick Edwards, Rob Kolstad, and Dr. Mason. As many as 160 young people participated each year, with a different design challenge set at each event. The competition's organizers requested space settlement designs in Earth orbit, on the Moon, on and in orbit around Mars, and on and in orbit around Venus (some limited atmospheric alterations were included to make it habitable). One Earth-orbiting settlement was required to be capable of moving to another solar system.

The first annual national competition was organized when SpaceWeek International Executive Director Brian Archimbaud considered that a Space Settlement Design Competition would be an appropriate inclusion to commemorate the 25th anniversary of the first lunar landing. The national event took place on July 17 to 19, 1994, in Washington, D.C. Astronauts and cosmonauts recruited as volunteers for this event were so impressed with its educational value, that they insisted that it continue as an annual event.

After Brian Archimbaud left SpaceWeek International in 1994, the organization decided not to continue supporting the program. Epcot in Walt Disney World agreed in 1995 to help Gale and Edwards meet the promise made to the astronauts and cosmonauts. In 1996, the competition acquired new hosts, the Center for Space Education and NASA's Kennedy Space Center (KSC).

Sponsorship by The Boeing Company made continuation of an annual International Space Settlement Design Competitions possible. In 2001, the KSC venue of the competition was moved to more spacious facilities at the Kurt Debus Conference Center, operated by the KSC Visitor Complex. In 2005 this facility was unavailable due to a planned Space Shuttle flight, and alternate arrangements were made at hotels in Titusville. When a 2006 Space Shuttle flight made KSC facilities unavailable again, the competition's organizers decided to permanently move finalist competitions to the Gilruth Center at Johnson Space Center in Houston, Texas. The ISSDC has since returned to KSC as its primary venue for its finalist competition.

Volunteer efforts that make the competition possible are contributed by members of Sections of the American Institute of Aeronautics and Astronautics in Texas and Orange County (California), the Society of Women Engineers in Texas, the Boeing Company, NASA JSC, and other entities in the area around JSC.

In addition to SpaceSet at JPL, local events based on the Space Settlement Design Competition format have been conducted for NASA's Dryden Flight Research Center (Antelope Valley and Victor Valley, California), NASA Johnson Space Center (Houston, Texas), and NASA White Sands Test Facility (Las Cruces, New Mexico).

The idea of a semi-finalist competition was first suggested by Mark Shaw from Brisbane. In 2004, advisers of a finalist team from Patiala asked if a competition could be conducted in Asia. Within months, procedures for the first-ever semi-finalist competition were developed by Gale and Edwards, with Abhishek Agarwal in India, and travel was arranged through a generous donation from The Boeing Company. The first semi-finalist competition was conducted at the American Center in Delhi in December 2004. Mark Shaw assembled a committee that conducted the first Australian semi-finalist competition in January 2007. Starting in 2008, the local JSC event was declared an ISSDC semi-final, and regional competitions selected finalists from Latin American and Eastern Europe. A semi-final for the UK and Western Europe was established in 2010. This has largely served to select UK students to form the UK and Western EU teams at the ISSDC final as of January 2020, due to the lack of regional competitions in Western Europe. In 2026 the first African team was sent to the competition. Representing South Africa, the team won their first time competing.

In 2008, the competition was recognized with presentations of two awards to Gale. The National Space Society presented the Space Pioneer Award in the category of Educator. The Boeing Company presented the William Allen Cup for Exceptional Volunteer Service.

== Competition outline ==
The ISSDC is split into two rounds: the qualifying round and the international finals. While entrants are usually teams with a high school affiliation, independent teams are allowed provided they are also in the high school age group. Teams have come from India, Australia, Austria, China, the United Kingdom, Uruguay, Pakistan and Romania, as well as the United States. One notable coalition team in the competition history's past included members from Argentina, Austria, Canada, the Netherlands, Poland, Ukraine, and the United States.

The competition uses a fictional organization called the Foundation Society to create a futuristic setting for the competition within the 21st century, and competitors must use plausible extensions of current technology in their proposals (e.g. no 'cold fusion' or space elevators). The Foundation Society issues a Press Release several days prior to the competition event. This prose document in the style of a news report or press briefing details the location and purpose of the space settlement which competitors will be asked to design. This is intended to give students the opportunity to perform independent research on the topic area. On the day of the competition event, fictional companies are created, with sizes varying from approximately 8 to 60, depending on the attendance, which compete for a 'contract' with the Foundation Society to build the space settlement. Teams entering the competition are often combined with others to produce larger companies and allow more students to compete at an event. Each company will appoint student 'officers' within the company; these include a company President, Vice President of Engineering, and Vice President of Marketing and Sales (a name taken from industry but not representative of the role). Each company is allotted adult 'CEOs' who are volunteering competition alumni or professionals in a relevant industry. The CEOs serve to support students and help ensure the smooth-running of the event, they do not hold executive power within the student company beyond decisions necessary for the safeguarding of students.

Once students in all companies have divided themselves into 'departments' responsible for different elements of the challenge, departments may attend a 'Technical Training Presentation/Session' to provide further information about how to work effectively on their area of the challenge. Once these have been completed, the President of each company will be presented with several copies of the Request for Proposal to be distributed to their company. This document details all of the performance requirements demanded by the settlement to be designed, broken down by department area: Structural Engineering, Operations and Infrastructure Engineering, Human Factors Engineering, Automation Engineering, Business Development, and Basic Requirements and Schedule and Cost which are excluded from the formed departments.

Companies have a limited time to create a response to the RFP detailed in a slideshow presentation before presenting to a panel of judges. Presentations are restricted in duration and slideshows are restricted to a specified number of slides. Presentations may utilize any format to describe a company's response to the RFP; these frequently include illustrations, diagrams, CAD models and renders, as well as plain text. Competitions vary as to whether they allow material beyond the slideshow file and the live presentation to be considered during judging. Following the presentation, companies must respond to a time-limited number of questions about their design from the judging panel.

=== Qualifying round ===
The qualifying round is known as the Space Settlement Design Competition (SSDC) in the US. Typically, the competition lasts 21 hours, and the judges announce the winning company a few hours after the proposal presentations. Members of the winning company become eligible for the international competition. A few weeks after the April qualifying round, 12 members from the winning proposal team are invited to the international competition.

In 2005, 2007 and 2009, regional qualifying competitions were introduced for Asia, Australia and Europe respectively. These competitions involve various tasks, ranging from vehicle design to settlement design. The arrangement of these competitions is much like that of the international finals. Before the introduction of the regional qualifying competitions, teams from these regions had to qualify through the main qualifying round.

Global regional competitions select their participants for the ISSDC through a competition in a similar format to the international finals, although held over a shorter time-frame. The Asian Regional SSDC (ARSSDC) group manages two qualifying rounds; the ARSSDC and the Indian National SSDC, both of which send participants to the international finals. Space Design Competitions Australia manages the Australian Space Design Competition (ASDC) whose national final, hosted annually at University of Queensland, is a qualifying round for the ISSDC. All of these qualifying rounds operate a Proposals Competition to allow teams to qualify for their ISSDC qualifying round competition; this challenges students to submit a response to an RFP in their own time, generally over the course of several school terms. The teams offering the best submissions are invited to the ISSDC qualifying round competition. These qualifying rounds operated by paid entry.

The UK Space Settlement Design Competition (UKSDC) operates differently; the UK National Final, hosted annually at Imperial College London, operates as an ISSDC qualifying round. The national final is fed from several UK regional competitions, each similar in format to the UK National Final but hosted over one day only, and from the Video Competition, a proposals competition where submissions are required in the format of a five-minute video. The UK qualifying round is free to enter and is funded by sponsors and donations. Twelve students are selected from across all UK companies to make up the UK team.

All of the qualifying competitions use a similar RFP which changes year to year. The qualifying RFP usually has either direct or thematic links to the RFP that will be set at the International Finals.

The South African Space Design Competition (ZASDC) first competed in 2026. The first National team was made up from top performers selected from the winning semi-final teams. The South African semi-finals took place at UCT.

=== International finals ===
At the international competition, held around the end of July or beginning of August, a new four companies are created, and each team from various countries is allowed to bring 12 members. Before 2006, companies were composed of two teams, but companies have since been formed with more teams and members (three qualified teams in 2009, and three qualified teams and one invited team in 2010). These companies are then given another RFP to complete a slide proposal for in 43 hours. Unlike in the qualifying round, companies are also offered "Red Team runs" on the second day of the competition, during which they have the opportunity to present their slides in front of judges prior to the final presentation for feedback.

== Components of proposal ==
Five general engineering disciplines are noted in the RFP and the company structure is divided . These sections are based on the various factors required in a colony's design and for its function. The RFP divides its content between these sections to guide competitors to the tasks they will most engage with and be capable of completing based on their individual skills and interests.

- Structural Engineering oversees the design of and the materials used to build the colony. The Structural department is responsible for the external design of the settlement and its internal land usage. This department must design the mechanical elements that maintain pressure, temperature, radiation protection, and other factors, such as artificial gravity. The designs made by the structural department must be detailed in terms of their size, geometry, and manufacturing method. The final construction of the settlement also falls under the purview of this department.
- Operations Engineering is responsible for the design and for planning maintenance of the critical services required by the space settlement. These services include, but are not limited to, liquid waste management, solid waste management, atmosphere management, electrical power generation and distribution, and functions related to the purpose of the settlement.
- Human Factors designs the interior living space of the colony and designs the services required for the settlement community. For those colonies where personal living spaces are to be designed and assigned, the design of homes is handled by the Human Factors department. Interior-land allocation is managed by this department, working alongside the Structural and Operations departments, with community designs incorporating residential, commercial, and industrial elements.
- Automation Design and Services determines the automated functions of the settlement. The Automation department determines how robots will be used in the colony, including during its construction, maintenance and operation. This department design how external communications and internal data networks will be implemented.
- Business Development is the responsible for detailing the profit-making activities of the settlement. This section is connected to other sections on matters of commercial opportunities, industrial manufacturing costs, research and development, and maintenance costs.

The proposal also includes a required section entitled "Schedule and Costs", which describes the construction schedule, detailed by location and stages, and total initial cost detailed by major section and by stage of construction. An additional section known as "Special Studies" is added only during the finals, which includes plans for emergency procedures to react to two disaster scenarios, as given by the Request For Proposal (RFP). The scenarios outlined change year-to-year.

== Colonies ==
The colonies involved in the competition appear on a regular cycle over four years, so that competitors will not have the advantage of formerly completing the same proposal personally. The colonies alternate between orbital (qualifying competition) and planetary (finals competition). The name of colonies are pre-determined, but entrants are permitted to modify the name, so long as three ground rules are followed:

- The name must end with a suffix indicating its location. For example, Earth orbital facilities end with "-at" (at Terra), while Lunar colonies end with "-ol" (on Luna).
- The name must begin with a letter indicating its position in the sequence of construction at each location. Alexandriat before Bellevistat, before Columbiat, etc.
- The name must be appropriate and relevant.

=== Earth colonies (orbiting) ===
- Alexandriat (Earth-Sun L5) – A colony built in 2024 to start construction of a solar shield at Earth-Sun L1 to slow global warming. It is now a manufacturing center and maintains the solar shield with 10,000 people. Often referred to by background information, this colony is not part of the competition cycle. Its name is based on Alexander the Great.
- Bellevistat (Earth-Sun L4) – A second colony built as a primary heavy manufacturing center in zero gravity. It is used for in-space manufacturing. Named as a reference to the Spanish phrase, Belle Vista, or beautiful view. Qualifying competition, recurring.
- Columbiat (Earth-Sun L5) – A third colony built as a "Singapore-in-orbit". It is also the new headquarters for the Foundation Society. This colony is meant to be the largest of the orbital colonies when it is operational in 2052. Its name originally referenced the Columbia river and its trade qualities; it now has connotations concerning the Space Shuttle Columbia. Qualifying competition, recurring.
- Darwinat (Ark Ship) – The fourth Earth orbiting settlement, and the only one required to be capable of moving to another Solar System as an Interstellar Ark. It was named for Charles Darwin, an English naturalist who realised and presented compelling evidence that all species of life have evolved over time from common ancestors. Qualifying competition, discontinued.

=== Lunar colonies ===
- Alaskol – The first lunar colony built. It is used to supply the orbiting colonies with supplies with materials for manufacturing. It is also the center of lunar tourism, located on the near side of the Moon. It was named in reference to Alaska, a hostile territory that offered many benefits to the settlers. Finals competition, recurring; 2004 cycle won by Edgewater High School in Orlando, Florida and Budha Dal Public School from Patiala, India; 2008 cycle won by Richard Montgomery High School, Durango High School, and Apeejay School (Indian team). In 2017 it was won by Shiv Nadar School Faridabad. In 2023 it was won by Lakshmipat Singhania Academy, India
- Balderol – The second lunar colony, which serves the same function as Alaskol. It is located on the far side of the Moon and acts as a scientific and industrial outpost. In 2024, its purpose was altered to become a data center, with additional housing capacity. It was named in reference to Balder, Norse god of beauty, indicating the unobstructed views from Balderol. Finals competition, recurring; 2005 cycle won by Whitney High School and Budha Dal Public School (Indian team); 2009 cycle won by the Australian Finalists (St Laurence's College, QLD; Strathmore Secondary College, VIC; St Aidan's Anglican Girls, QLD; All Hallows School, QLD), Phoenix Quintessential (Cerritos, California), Eastern European finalists (Romania) and East Chapel Hill High School (Chapel Hill, North Carolina). The 2014 and 2019 were won by Lakshmipat Singhania Academy, among other teams. The 2024 cycle was won by Vulture Aviation, made up of India (Lakshmipat Singhania Academy and Amity International School Pushp Vihar), China, US East Coast, United Kingdom and Australia.

=== Martian colonies ===
- Aresam – First pace settlement in Mars orbit, serving as a critical hub for cargo and passengers between Mars and Earth. It supports Mars surface operations and asteroid belt mining. It includes HighPort for interplanetary ships and MarsPort for landings. Aresam offers modern amenities and natural views of Mars. This ambitious project by the Foundation Society aims to generate profits through Martian exports and support future Martian infrastructure development. Qualifying competition, recurring.
- Argonom – The first colony on the surface of Mars, this outpost acts as the primary outpost on Mars, focusing on tourism and industry. This colony also establishes scientific outposts. It was named for Argo, the ship of Jason and the Argonauts. Finals competition, recurring; 2006 cycle won by Whitney High School and Apeejay School, Mahavir Marg (Indian team); 2010 cycle won by Whitney High School, Lahore Grammar School (Pakistani team), East Chapel Hill High School (Chapel Hill, North Carolina), and UK Combined Schools (City of London Academy, Pate's Grammar School, and Wallington County Grammar School)
- Bradburyom – The second colony on the surface of Mars, the colony expands on the purpose of Argonom, seeking out additional natural resources. The main intent of the colony is to act as base for the terraforming of Mars while continuing scientific studies. It was named after Ray Bradbury, in recognition of the influence The Martian Chronicles had on the modern perception of Mars. Finals competition, recurring; 2007 cycle won by Durango High School, Mircea cel Batran Student Research Center Team "B" (Romanian team), All Hallows' and St. Aidan's Schools (Australian team), and Liceo 4 Maldonado (Uruguayan team); 2016 cycle won by Lakshmipat Singhania Academy, Kolkata, India, Iowa international school, Iowa, USA, Lahore Grammar School JT Boys, Pakistan, and a team from UK.

=== Asteroid Belt ===
- Astoria – The first and, currently, only colony established in the Asteroid Belt. This station acts as a staging area for future endeavors into the outer Solar System, mining and refining operations, both private and commercial, and ship construction and repair. It was named for John Jacob Astor, an investor who became wealthy by taking advantage of opportunities others did not see. Qualifying Competition, replacing Darwinat in the competition cycle, recurring; Delhi Public School RK Puram (Sum 42) from India won the 2016 edition along with Lahore Grammar School Johar Town. The 2026 edition was won by Amity International School Pushp Vihar along with Team Ignite and Chongqing Yucai Secondary School
- Cassendras – Transport colony in a 80-day cycler orbit from Earth to Mars. It is the first and only one of the only fusion powered spaceships available for commercial use. It is named after Cassandra.

=== Mercurial colonies ===
- Aynah – The first colony established in the orbital of Mercury. This station acts as a mining and refining location of a wonder-metal, Reardonium which is extracted on the Mercurial surface. It was named after Ayn Rand, the author of Atlas Shrugged. This wonder metal is lightweight, strong, self-lubricating and provides protection against heat, cold and radiation. Such a metal's production and export is a high revenue extracting source which gives Aynah its economy. Recurring; 2017 cycle won by Delhi Public School, R.K. Puram (Team 1: Astra and Team 2: Alexiares), Lakshmipat Singhania Academy, Little Flower High School, Sushila Birla Girls School, R.N. Poddar School (all from India); LGS JT (boys), LGS 55 Main and LGS JT (girls, all from Pakistan).
- Anconioh – The first colony on the surface of Mercury, seen in the Asian regional semi-finals, and the 2022 international finals. It is a moving settlement around the terminator line, constructed for greater production of reardonium. The 2022 cycle was won by Vulture Aviation, which consisted of students from the UK, America (Including Duncan High School), Argentina (Islands International School, Buenos Aires) and India (Amity International School, Noida).

=== Venusian colonies ===
- Asimov – The first colony established on Venus, floating in the atmosphere at about 56 km altitude. It was developed to experiment with the properties of reardonium and other products under Venusian conditions and for mining purposes. It was named after Isaac Asimov, whose Foundation novels gave the Foundation Society its name. The 2012 cycle was won by the Rockdonnell company, which consisted of students from Romania, United Kingdom, Australia and the United States.

=== Competition sequence ===
The appearance of colonies is on a set cycle repeating every four years. The cycle is as follows:

| Qualifying | Finals |
|---|---|
| Bellevistat | Alaskol |
| Columbiat | Balderol |
| Aresam | Argonom |
| Astoria (previously Darwinat) | Bradburyom |
| Aynah | Asimov |

This cycle was broken for the first time in 2022, when competitors were asked to design Anconioh. This competition was won by Vulture Aviation, which consisted of students from the UK, America (Including Duncan High School), Argentina (Islands International School, Buenos Aires) and India (Amity International School, Noida).

The first year cycle was followed again in 2023 where in the finals they were asked to make Alaskol. The competition was won by Dougledyne Astrosystems and Fletchel Constructors(DAFC) Teams from India(Lakshmipat Singhania Academy), China(Tsinghua International School), European Union, and USA.

== Awards ==
At the international competition, the company with the best proposal is "awarded the contract".

- Best Team Presentation

This award was established for the best individual presenter of each company. The winners are chosen by the panel of judges from the Foundation Society.

- Dick Edwards Award for Silent Leadership

In honor of the competition co-founder, Dick Edwards, who died in early 2009, this award was established for the best student leader, ideally given to the president or vice president within their participating team, from each company. The winners are chosen by advisers and company "CEOs."

- Anita Gale Creative Genius Award

In honor of Anita Gale, the co-founder of the competition who died in 2024, this award was established to recognize an individual student who consistently contributed outstanding ideas and designs throughout the competition. One student from each company is selected to receive this award.
