= Carrboro High School =

School in North Carolina

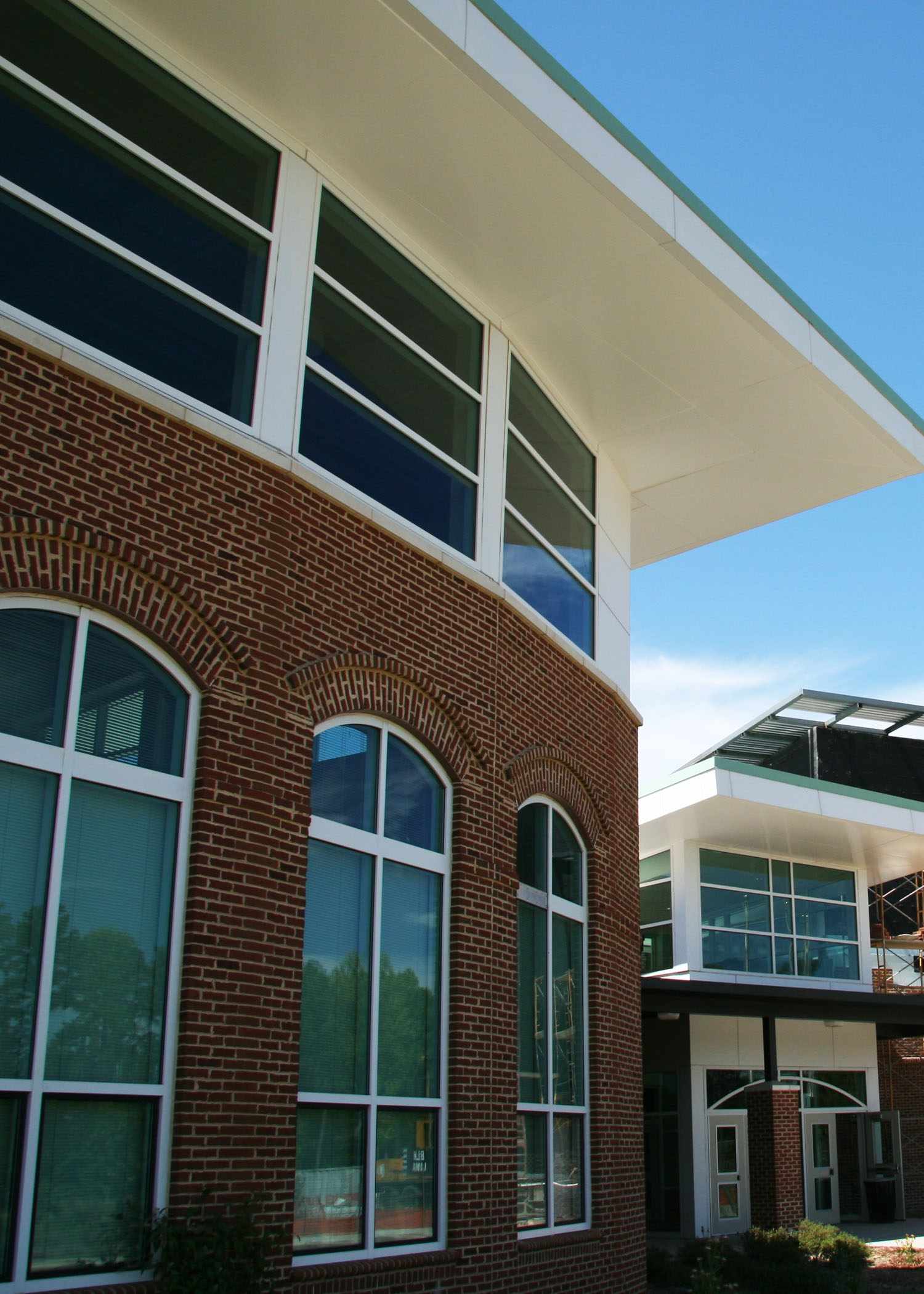
- Library windows at entrance

Location
- 201 Rock Haven Road; Carrboro, North Carolina 27510; United States; 35°53′31″N 79°05′07″W

Information
- Type: Public
- Motto: Non Scholae Sed Vitae Discimus
- Established: 2007 (19 years ago)
- School district: Chapel Hill-Carrboro City Schools
- CEEB code: 340590
- Principal: Helena Thomas
- Teaching staff: 62.08 (FTE)
- Grades: 9–12
- Gender: Coeducational
- Enrollment: 877 (2023-2024)
- Student to teacher ratio: 14.13
- Colors: Purple, black, and white
- Mascot: Jaguar
- Nickname: Jaguars
- Website: www.chccs.org/chs
- All data from school website/handbook.

Carrboro High School is located in Carrboro, North Carolina, United States. It is located close to the University of North Carolina at Chapel Hill. Carrboro High school is part of the Chapel Hill-Carrboro City Schools district which contains two other high schools, Chapel Hill High School and East Chapel Hill High School. Its first year of operation was the 2007–2008 school year. It is the smallest CHCCS high school with total enrollment being 895. The student body makeup is 51 percent male and 49 percent female, and the total minority enrollment is 42 percent. Helena Thomas is the principal. She was hired for the position in 2023.

== Academics ==
Carrboro High School is ranked 10th in the 2016 US News rankings. The school posted the fourth highest average SAT score in the Raleigh-Durham area: 1750 with 89.3% of students taking the test. There is a high AP® participation rate at Carrboro High at 80 percent and 74 percent pass. Additionally, there is a 15:1 student-teacher ratio. It has higher than state average proficiency across the board.

Carrboro High School has a focus on international studies; all freshman students are part of the Academy of International Studies. They can continue the Academy of International Studies in 10th through 12th grade if they choose. Students in the academy will take several core classes with an international focus and have other specific requirements they must meet, for example, 20 international service hours. This also means several international focused electives are offered, to students both in the academy and not.

== Athletics ==
Carrboro High School is a member of the North Carolina High School Athletics Association (NCHSAA). Carrboro High School has access to a baseball field, a softball field, a track, a gymnasium, two general practice fields, and a cross country course. The two fields are used for football and soccer during the fall season.

Carrboro cross-country won the school's first trophy from its second-place finish in the Open race at the Tanglewood Invitational, held in Winston-Salem. Carrboro High's women's cross country team won the 2A state championship in 2009, 2010, 2011, 2012, and 2014 and the boys cross country team won the state championship in 2010. The women's track & field team won the 2A state championship in 2011, 2012, and 2013, and the women's soccer team won in 2012, 2015, and 2016. The Jags added their first 2A dual team men's tennis state championship in spring 2014. Max Fritsch and Jake Zinn also won the school's first individual tennis title, taking the 2014 2A doubles state championship. Both feats were repeated in 2015. Men's swimming won state champions in 2010, 2011, 2012, and 2015. Carrboro High School won the Wells Fargo Conference Cup every year since 2011 and the Wells Fargo Cup three times in 2011–2012, 2012–2013, and 2013–2014 school years for having the strongest 2A athletic program in the state.

== Arts ==
Carrboro High School is now home to three a cappella groups. Students also perform a fall play, an annual spring musical and several One Acts performances (which are all written, directed and performed by students).

== Principals ==
- Jeff Thomas, 2007–2008
- Kelly Batten, 2008–2012
- LaVerne Mattocks, 2012–2017
- Beverly Rudolph, 2017–2023
- Helena Thomas, 2023–present

== Notable alumni ==
- Sydney West graduated from Carrboro before her disappearance.
