= Bill Ransom Campbell =

American architect (1920–1996)

- Born: William Ransom Campbell Jr. February 6, 1920; Durham, North Carolina, U.S.
- Died: July 27, 1996 (aged 76)
- Resting place: Durham, North Carolina, U.S.
- Education: Chapel Hill High School; University of North Carolina at Chapel Hill
- Occupation: Architect
- Spouse: Ola Adelle Stearns
- Children: 3 adopted

William Ransom Campbell Jr. (February 6, 1920 – July 27, 1996) was an American architect. He was a member of a group of modernist architects in North Carolina that had a major academic and architectural influence on the Modernism movement in the 1950s through 1970s.

He is the architect of the William and Jean Winders' residence, as well as being a former member of the Association of University Architects.

== Early life ==
=== Childhood ===
Campbell was born on February 6, 1920, in Durham, North Carolina, and graduated from Chapel Hill High School.

=== Education ===
After graduating from Chapel Hill High School, Campbell went to the University of North Carolina at Chapel Hill for a few years before being interrupted by service in the Navy during WWII. After finishing his service, he and his wife, Ola Adelle Stearns, or "Jinx", decided to attend college in Ada, Oklahoma. In 1947, the two moved to New Orleans to be at Tulane University before moving again to Raleigh, North Carolina. In Raleigh, Bill finished his degree in Architecture at North Carolina State University's School of Design.

== Career ==
Campbell's first part of his career was working for design firms in Charlotte, NC and Greensboro, NC. Following this, he spent a short time working for architect Jim Webb, and photographing his houses. Campbell then moved to Fayetteville, Arkansas, and served as the architect and facilities planner at the University of Arkansas at Fayetteville from 1959-1965. Campbell was a member of the Association of University Architects and served as the president of the Association. After adopting three children, the Campbells moved to Hawaii and Bill had the job of Director of Facilities Planning at the University of Hawaii for three years. In 1968, the well traveled family moved to Oklahoma, where he had many titles in university and medical facilities planning at the University of Oklahoma. This was his last university job. They then moved to Morehead City, North Carolina where he worked for Carol Bivens.

== Personal life ==
Campbell had two brothers and a sister. Their names were Charles Campbell, James Campbell, and Ouida Campbell Taylor. While in the Navy serving as a radioman, Bill met Ola Adelle Stearns, a.k.a. "Jinx", who was an air traffic controller. The two got married and never separated. The Campbells adopted three kids, though one of them (Mitchell Alden Campbell) died in his teens. Barclay William Campbell and Kelley Sue Campbell Hill are the two children that are still living.

== Death ==
On July 27, 1996, Bill died from cancer in his home. A memorial service was held to honor Bill's life on July 31, 1996. At this event, he was called "a true Renaissance man." He was buried in Durham, North Carolina.
