= Rapid React =

2022 FIRST Robotics Competition game

- Year: 2022

Season Information
- Number of teams: 3,225
- Number of regionals: 58
- Number of district events: 101
- Championship location: Houston; George R. Brown Convention Center

FIRST Championship Awards
- Chairman's Award winner: 1629 - "Garrett Coalition"
- Woodie Flowers Award winner: Christine Sapio - Team 2486
- Champions: 1619 - "Up-A-Creek Robotics"; 254 - "The Cheesy Poofs"; 3175 - "Knight Vision"; 6672 - "Fusion Corps"

Rapid React, stylized as RAPID REACT and officially known as Rapid React presented by The Boeing Company for sponsorship reasons, is the FIRST Robotics Competition (FRC) game for the 2022 season. The game is themed around transportation as part of the FIRST-wide FIRST Forward theme for 2021-2022.

Rapid React is played by two alliances of three teams each, with each team controlling a robot and completing specific actions in order to score points. The game revolves around both alliances shooting inflatable balls known as Cargo into a central Hub and climbing within their Hangars at the end of the match. The overall objective of each match is to score more points than the opposing alliance before the match ends.

The 2022 season was the first season since 2016 to feature a single championship, which took place in Houston, Texas on April 20 to April 23. As a result of the reduction from two championships to one, 456 teams were invited to compete at the championship as opposed to over 800 teams in 2019.

== Kickoff ==
Kickoff occurred on January 8, 2022. It was streamed live on Twitch, with the broadcast beginning at 11:45 A.M. Eastern Time. The game was revealed approximately 45 minutes into the broadcast, which featured presentations from teams and game sponsors.

Similar to the 2021 kickoff, many kickoff events were hosted online, with the only in-person event being part pick-up. Some of these events were originally scheduled to be online, while others switched to virtual due to the COVID-19 pandemic.

== Field and Scoring ==
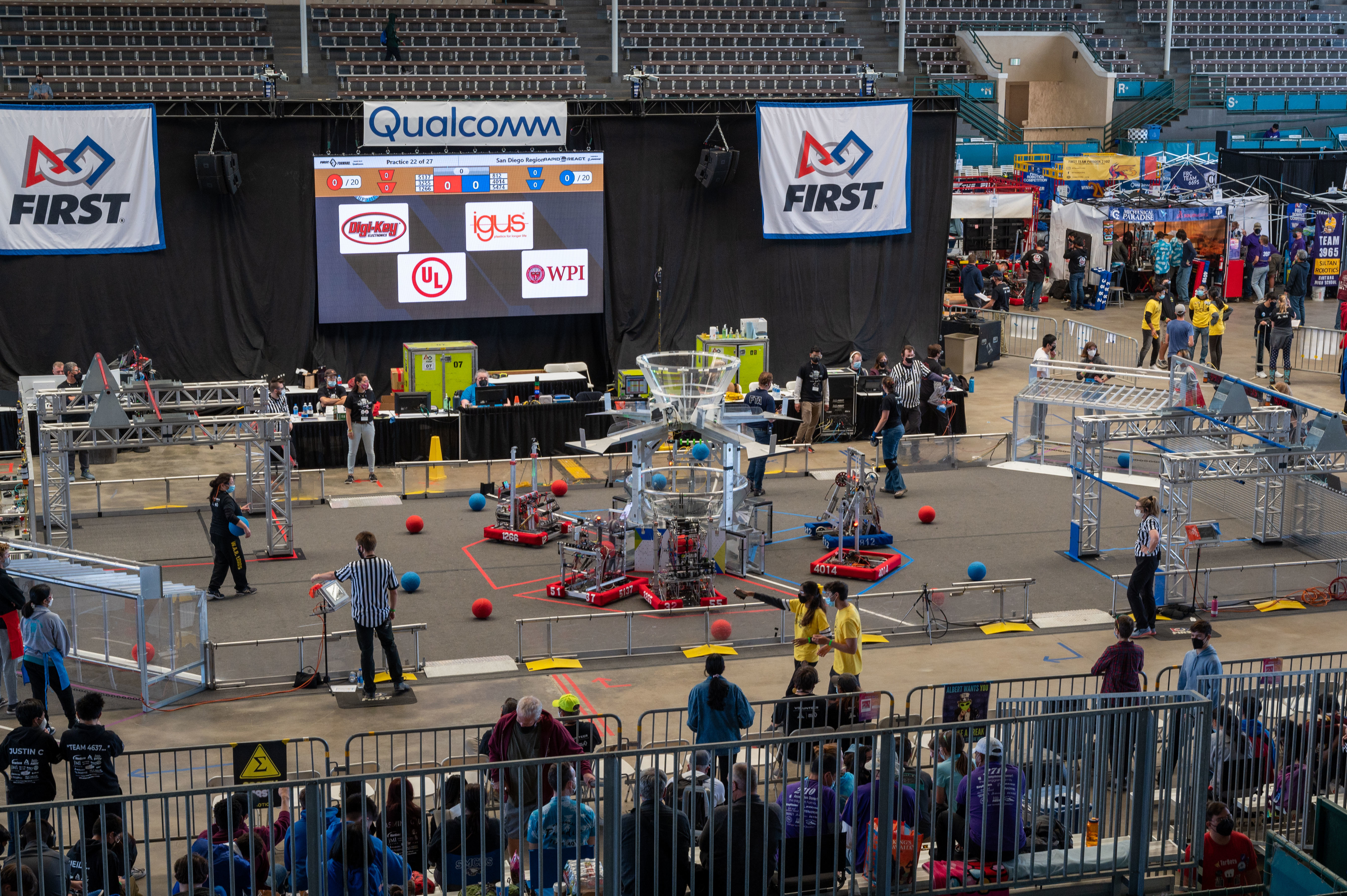
The field prior to a match.

Rapid React is played on a 27 ft. (~823 cm) by 54 ft. (~1646 cm) field covered in grey carpet. The field is surrounded by low polycarbonate walls on the long sides and higher polycarbonate driver station walls on the short sides. The field is divided in half by a white line. The primary scoring area, called the Hub, is surrounded by four taped-off areas known as Tarmacs (two red and two blue) where robots start the match. At the end of the match, robots can climb monkey bars in areas called the Hangars.

=== Alliance Station ===
Each alliance has their own alliance station on their end of the field, divided into three smaller stations (one for each team). The alliance stations are flanked by the alliance's Hangar on one side and a Terminal on the other side.

==== Terminals ====
Alliances can use the Terminals to introduce Cargo into the field and return Cargo to their human players. Either alliance can use either Terminal, as opposed to player stations in previous games which were restricted to one alliance. Due to this, human players in the terminals must wear alliance-colored aprons to identify themselves.

=== Cargo ===
Cargo is the only game element in Rapid React. Each Cargo is an oversized inflatable tennis ball with a diameter of 9.5 in. (~24 cm). There are 22 Cargo on the field, 11 per alliance.

=== Scoring Areas ===
==== Hub ====
There is one Hub in the center of the field, and both alliances can score in it. There are two levels, a lower hub 3 ft 5 in (~104 cm) above the field and an upper hub 8 ft. 8 in. (~264 cm) above the field. Robots earn more points by shooting into the upper hub compared to shooting into the lower hub. The upper hub is smaller than the lower hub, which combined with its height makes it harder to score into.

Scoring in the lower hub is worth two points in autonomous mode and one point in teleoperated mode, while scoring in the upper hub is worth four points and two points respectively. Alliances can earn a ranking point by scoring 20 Cargo in the Hub, or 18 Cargo if the alliance scored 5 Cargo in autonomous mode. This is known as the Cargo Bonus.

==== Hangars ====
Hangars are large trusses with four legs, similar to the Shield Generator in Infinite Recharge. There are two Hangars, one for each alliance. At the end of the match, robots can climb onto the monkey bars in their alliance's Hangar to earn climb points. There are four levels, with the lowest bar positioned 4 ft. 3/4 in. (~124 cm) above the field and the highest bar positioned 7 ft. 7 in. (~231 cm) above the field. Robots may not extend to be taller than 5 ft. 6 in. (~168cm) at any point in the match, so the top two bars cannot be reached directly from the carpet.

Teams earn more points for climbing to higher levels of the monkey bars. The lowest level is worth 4 points, with the other three levels worth 6 points, 10 points, and 15 points respectively. Alliances can earn the Hangar Bonus by scoring at least 16 climb points.

===== Launch Pads =====
Each alliance's Hangar also provides two safe zones called the Launch Pads, which allow that alliance's robots to shoot Cargo into the Hub without being contacted by opponent robots. The Launch Pads are identified by strips of alliance-colored plastic on the bottom of the two Hub-facing legs of each Hangar, and a team can enter the safe zone by touching one of their alliance's Launch Pads with their robot's bumper. A team is assessed a foul if their robot contacts an opponent robot that is touching one of the opponent's Launch Pads.

==== Scoring Summary ====
Action	Autonomous	Teleoperated	Ranking Points (in Qualification)
Robot Exits Tarmac	2 points		
Cargo in Lower Hub	2 points	1 point	
Cargo in Upper Hub	4 points	2 points	
Hangar Climb (Level One)		4 points	
Hangar Climb (Level Two)		6 points	
Hangar Climb (Level Three)		10 Points	
Hangar Climb (Level Four)		15 Points	
Cargo Bonus			1 RP
Hangar Bonus			1 RP
Foul	4 points to opposing alliance	4 points to opposing alliance	
Tech Foul	8 points to opposing alliance	8 points to opposing alliance	
Win			2 RP
Tie			1 RP

== Events ==
The 2022 season is divided into seven weeks, with many events occurring simultaneously during each week. After Week 7, teams that have qualified compete in the FIRST Championship in Houston. For this season, the FIRST Chesapeake District, Ontario District, and Festival de Robotique Regional moved to one-day events as part of their COVID-19 pandemic plan. These events are noted below.

=== Week 1 ===
Event	Location	Date
South Florida Regional	West Palm Beach, Florida	March 2 – 5
Lake Superior Regional	Duluth, Minnesota	March 2 – 5
Northern Lights Regional	Duluth, Minnesota	March 2 – 5
Canadian Pacific Regional	Victoria, British Columbia, Canada	March 2 – 5
FIM District Detroit Event	Detroit, Michigan	March 3 – 5
FIM District Forest Hills Event	Grand Rapids, Michigan	March 3 – 5
FIM District Kettering University Event #1	Flint, Michigan	March 3 – 5
FIM District Petoskey Event	Petoskey, Michigan	March 3 – 5
NE District Granite State Event	Salem, New Hampshire	March 3 – 5
FIT District Waco Event	Waco, Texas	March 3 – 5
PNW District Clackamas Academy Event	Oregon City, Oregon	March 3 – 5
New Taipei City x Hon Hai Regional	Taipei, Taiwan	March 3 – 6
Izmir Regional	Gaziemir, Izmir, Turkey	March 3 – 6
Hueneme Port Regional	Port Hueneme, California	March 3 – 6
FIN District Kokomo Event	Kokomo, Indiana	March 4 – 6
FMA District Bridgewater-Raritan Event	Bridgewater Township, New Jersey	March 4 – 6
FMA District Hatboro-Horsham Event	Horsham, Pennsylvania	March 4 – 6
FIT District Dripping Springs Event	Dripping Springs, Texas	March 4 – 6
PNW District Glacier Peak Event	Snohomish, Washington	March 4 – 6
CHS District Greater DC Event #1	Washington, D.C.	March 5 – 6 (Note: Two one-day events)
ONT District Humber College Event	Toronto, Ontario, Canada	March 5 – 6
CHS District Greater Richmond Event #1	Charlottesville, Virginia	March 5 – 6
ISR District Event #1	Ra'anana, Israel	March 6 – 8

=== Week 2 ===
Event	Location	Date
ISR District Event #2	Ra'anana, Israel	March 8 – 10
Orlando Regional	Orlando, Florida	March 9 – 12
Finger Lakes Regional	Rochester, New York	March 9 – 12
Electric City Regional	Anderson, South Carolina	March 9 – 12
Monterrey Regional	Monterrey, Nuevo León, Mexico	March 9 – 12
Oklahoma Regional	Shawnee, Oklahoma	March 9 – 12
Arizona North Regional	Flagstaff, Arizona	March 9 – 12
Orange County Regional	Costa Mesa, California	March 9 – 12
Ventura County Regional	Port Hueneme, California	March 9 – 12
PCH District Dalton Event	Dalton, Georgia	March 10 – 12
FIM District Gull Lake Event	Richland, Michigan	March 10 – 12
FIM District Kettering University Event #2	Flint, Michigan	March 10 – 12
FIM District Milford Event	Highland Township, Michigan	March 10 – 12
FIM District Rochester Event	Rochester Hills, Michigan	March 10 – 12
FIM District St. Joseph Event	St. Joseph, Michigan	March 10 – 12
PNW District Wilsonville Event	Wilsonville, Oregon	March 10 – 12
Southern Cross Regional	Wollongong, New South Wales, Australia	March 10 – 13
NE District Waterbury Event	Waterbury, Connecticut	March 11 – 13
NE District Pine Tree Event	Waterville, Maine	March 11 – 13
FNC District ECU Event	Greenville, North Carolina	March 11 – 13
FMA District Mount Olive Event	Mount Olive, New Jersey	March 11 – 13
FIT District Channelview Event	Channelview, Texas	March 11 – 13
CHS District Greater DC Event #2	Washington, D.C.	March 12 – 13
New York Tech Valley Regional	Albany, New York	March 13 – 16

=== Week 3 ===
Event	Location	Date
Istanbul Regional	Istanbul, Turkey	March 14 – 17
Tallahassee Regional	Tallahassee, Florida	March 16 – 19
Greater Pittsburgh Regional	California, Pennsylvania	March 16 – 19
Central Illinois Regional	Peoria, Illinois	March 16 – 19
Heartland Regional	Olathe, Kansas	March 16 – 19
Canadian Rockies Regional	Calgary, Alberta, Canada	March 16 – 19
Arizona Valley Regional	Scottsdale, Arizona	March 16 – 19
PCH District Columbus Event	Columbus, Georgia	March 17 – 19
FIM District Escanaba Event	Escanaba, Michigan	March 17 – 19
FIM District Livonia Event	Livonia, Michigan	March 17 – 19
FIM District Muskegon Event	Muskegon, Michigan	March 17 – 19
FIT District Austin Event	Austin, Texas	March 17 – 19
FIT District Fort Worth Event	Fort Worth, Texas	March 17 – 19
PNW District SunDome Event	Yakima, Washington	March 17 – 19
San Diego Regional	Del Mar, California	March 17 – 20
San Francisco Regional	San Francisco, California	March 17 – 20
Bosphorus Regional	Istanbul, Turkey	March 18 – 20
FIN District Columbus Event	Columbus, Indiana	March 18 – 20
NE District North Shore Event	Reading, Massachusetts	March 18 – 20
NE District Western New England Event	Springfield, Massachusetts	March 18 – 20
FNC District UNC Asheville Event	Asheville, North Carolina	March 18 – 20
FMA District Springside Chestnut Hill Academy Event	Philadelphia, Pennsylvania	March 18 – 20
PNW District Sammamish Event	Bellevue, Washington	March 18 – 20
CHS District Greater DC Event #4	Washington, D.C.	March 19 – 20
ONT District Victoria Park C.I. Event	Toronto, Ontario, Canada	March 19 – 20
ONT District Georgian College Event	Barrie, Ontario, Canada	March 19 – 20
CHS District Greater Richmond Event #2	Charlottesville, Virginia	March 19 – 20
ISR District Event #3	Ra'anana, Israel	March 20 – 22
SPBLI Long Island Regional #1	Hempstead, New York	March 20 – 23

=== Week 4 ===
Event	Location	Date
ISR District Event #4	Ra'anana, Israel	March 22 – 24
Buckeye Regional	Cleveland, Ohio	March 23 – 26
Iowa Regional	Cedar Falls, Iowa	March 23 – 26
Greater Kansas City Regional	Lee's Summit, Missouri	March 23 – 26
Great Northern Regional	Grand Forks, North Dakota	March 23 – 26
Wisconsin Regional	Milwaukee, Wisconsin	March 23 – 26
Colorado Regional	Denver, Colorado	March 23 – 26
Laguna Regional	Torreón, Coahuila, Mexico	March 23 – 26
Sacramento Regional	Davis, California	March 23 – 26
Monterey Bay Regional	Seaside, California	March 23 – 26
PCH District Carrollton Event	Carrollton, Georgia	March 24 – 26
FIN District Tippecanoe Event	Lafayette, Indiana	March 24 – 26
FIM District Belleville Event	Belleville, Michigan	March 24 – 26
FIM District Lansing Event	Mason, Michigan	March 24 – 26
FIM District Midland Event	Midland, Michigan	March 24 – 26
FIM District West Michigan Event	Allendale Township, Michigan	March 24 – 26
SPBLI Long Island Regional #2	Hempstead, New York	March 24 – 26
FIT District Irving Event	Irving, Texas	March 24 – 26
FIT District Pasadena Event #1	Pasadena, Texas	March 24 – 26
PNW District Oregon State Fairgrounds Event	Salem, Oregon	March 24 – 26
Hangzhou Regional	Hangzhou, Zhejiang, China	March 24 – 27
ONT District University of Waterloo Event	Waterloo, Ontario, Canada	March 25 – 26
NE District Greater Boston Event	Somerville, Massachusetts	March 25 – 27
NE District Central Massachusetts Event	Shrewsbury, Massachusetts	March 25 – 27
FIM District Saline Event	Ann Arbor, Michigan	March 25 – 27
FNC District Guilford County Event	Gibsonville, North Carolina	March 25 – 27
FMA District Seneca Event	Tabernacle, New Jersey	March 25 – 27
PNW District Auburn Event	Auburn, Washington	March 25 – 27
CHS District Greater DC Event #3	Washington, D.C.	March 26 – 27
ONT District York University Event	Toronto, Ontario, Canada	March 25 – 27
FIRST Israel District Championship	Jerusalem, Israel	March 27 – 29

=== Week 5 ===
Event	Location	Date
Smoky Mountains Regional	Knoxville, Tennessee	March 30 – April 2
Arkansas Regional	Searcy, Arkansas	March 30 – April 2
Bayou Regional	Kenner, Louisiana	March 30 – April 2
St. Louis Regional	St. Louis, Missouri	March 30 – April 2
Seven Rivers Regional	Searcy, Arkansas	March 30 – April 2
Idaho Regional	Nampa, Idaho	March 30 – April 2
Central Valley Regional	Fresno, California	March 30 – April 2
Las Vegas Regional	Las Vegas, Nevada	March 30 – April 2
Hawaii Regional	Honolulu, Hawaii	March 30 – April 2
PCH District Albany Event	Albany, Georgia	March 31 – April 2
FIM District Kentwood Event	Kentwood, Michigan	March 31 – April 2
FIM District Lakeview Event	Battle Creek, Michigan	March 31 – April 2
FIM District Macomb Event	Warren, Michigan	March 31 – April 2
FIM District Troy Event	Troy, Michigan	March 31 – April 2
NE District Pease ANG Event	Portsmouth, New Hampshire	March 31 – April 2
FIT District Amarillo Event	Amarillo, Texas	March 31 – April 2
FIT District Pasadena Event #2	Pasadena, Texas	March 31 – April 2
PNW District West Valley Event	Spokane Valley, Washington	March 31 – April 2
Central Missouri Regional	Sedalia, Missouri	March 31 – April 3
Los Angeles Regional	El Segundo, California	March 31 – April 3
ONT District Windsor Essex Great Lakes Event	Windsor, Ontario, Canada	April 1 – 2
FNC District UNC Pembroke Event	Pembroke, North Carolina	April 1 – 3
FMA District Montgomery Event	Montgomery, New Jersey	April 1 – 3
FMA District Bensalem Event	Bensalem, Pennsylvania	April 1 – 3
PNW District Bonney Lake Event	Bonney Lake, Washington	April 1 – 3
ONT District North Bay Event	North Bay, Ontario, Canada	April 2 – 3
ONT District Durham College Event	Oshawa, Ontario, Canada	April 2 – 3

=== Week 6 ===
Event	Location	Date
FIRST Chesapeake District Championship	Hampton, Virginia	April 6 – 9
Rocket City Regional	Huntsville, Alabama	April 6 – 9
Midwest Regional	Chicago, Illinois	April 6 – 9
Minnesota 10,000 Lakes Regional	Minneapolis, Minnesota	April 6 – 9
Minnesota North Star Regional	Minneapolis, Minnesota	April 6 – 9
Green Country Regional	Tulsa, Oklahoma	April 6 – 9
FIRST in Texas District Championship	Houston, Texas	April 6 – 9
Utah Regional	West Valley City, Utah	April 6 – 9
Aerospace Valley Regional	Lancaster, California	April 6 – 9
Pacific Northwest District Championship	Cheney, Washington	April 6 – 9
Festival de Robotique Regional	Montreal, Quebec, Canada	April 7 – 9 (Note: Three one-day events)
Peachtree District Championship	Macon, Georgia	April 7 – 9
FIM District Jackson Event	Spring Arbor, Michigan	April 7 – 9
FIM District Traverse City Event	Traverse City, Michigan	April 7 – 9
FIRST Mid-Atlantic District Championship	Bethlehem, Pennsylvania	April 7 – 9
FIM District Kingsford Event	Kingsford, Michigan	April 7 – 9
New York City Regional	New York, New York	April 7 – 10
Silicon Valley Regional	San Jose, California	April 7 – 10
NE District Hartford Event	Hartford, Connecticut	April 8 – 10
NE District WPI Event	Worcester, Massachusetts	April 8 – 10
FIM District Walled Lake Event	Commerce Township, Michigan	April 8 – 10
FIM District Woodhaven Event	Brownstown Township, Michigan	April 8 – 10
FIRST North Carolina District Championship	Buies Creek, North Carolina	April 8 – 10
ONT District St. Mary C.S.S. Event	Hamilton, Ontario, Canada	April 9 – 10

=== Week 7 ===
Event	Location	Date
FIRST in Michigan District Championship	University Center, Michigan	April 13 – 16
New England District Championship	Springfield, Massachusetts	April 13 – 16
Indiana District Championship	Terre Haute, Indiana	April 14 – 16
Ontario District Championship	Mississauga, Ontario, Canada	April 14 – 16

=== FIRST Championship ===
Event	Location	Date
FIRST Championship	Houston, Texas	April 20 – 23

== World Championship Results ==
The following tables show the winners of each division and the divisional playoff results.

=== Division Winners ===
Division	Captain	1st Pick	2nd Pick	3rd Pick
Carver	604	1323	4153	3603
Galileo	1619	254	3175	6672
Hopper	1706	1678	5454	4213
Newton	2910	973	1730	5804
Roebling	5940	6328	2471	3534
Turing	1577	4414	2539	4099

=== Divisional Playoff ===
==== Round Robin ====
Pos	Division	Pld	W	L	Pts	Qualification
1	Turing (Q)	5	4	1	1.6	Advance to Einstein Finals
2	Galileo (Q)	5	3	2	1.2	Advance to Einstein Finals
3	Newton	5	3	2	1.2	
4	Carver	5	2	3	0.8	
5	Hopper	5	2	3	0.8	
6	Roebling	5	1	4	0.4	

(Q) Qualified for the phase indicated

==== Einstein Finals ====
Division	Alliance	1	2	3	Wins
Turing	1577-4414-2539-4099	126	154	108	1
Galileo	1619-254-3175-6672	127	133	142	2
