= Chapel Hill-Carrboro City Schools =

School district in North Carolina, US

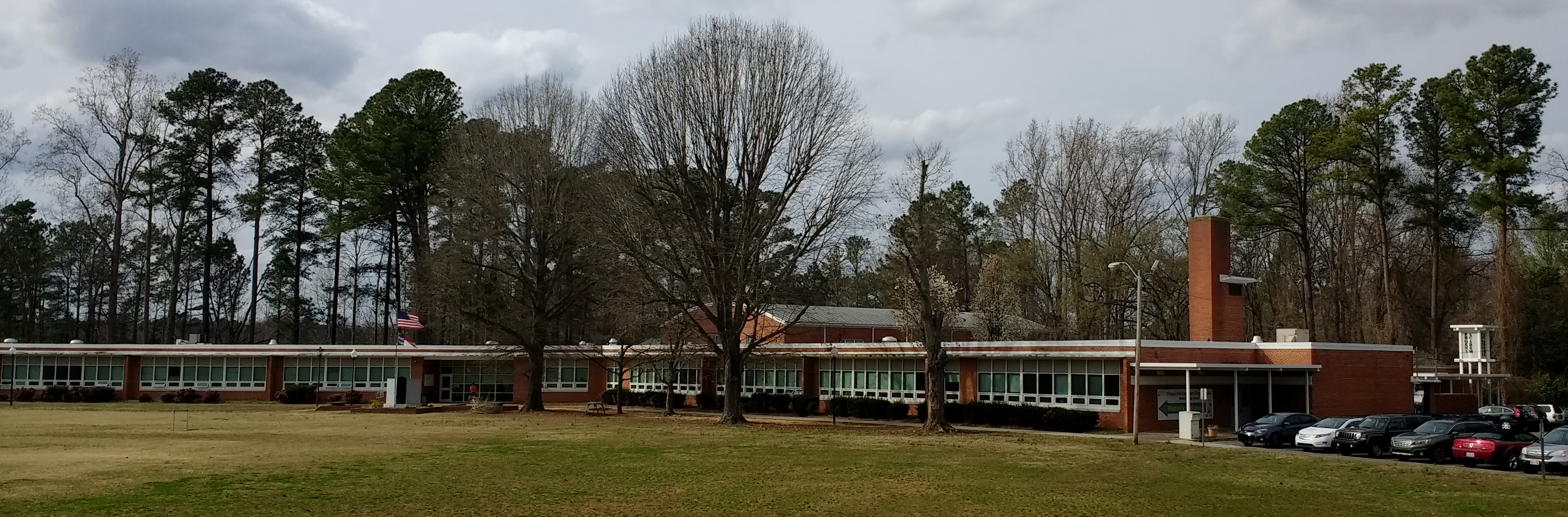

Location
- Chapel Hill and Carrboro; North Carolina United States

District information
- Type: Public
- Grades: PreK-12
- Established: 1909
- Superintendent: Rodney Trice

Students and staff
- Students: 11,561
- Staff: 2,000

Other information
- Website: https://www.chccs.org/

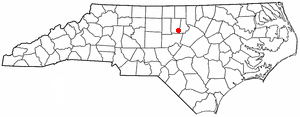
Location of Chapel Hill in North Carolina

Location of North Carolina within the United States

Chapel Hill-Carrboro City Schools (CHCCS) is a school district which educates over 12,000 students (pre-K through 12th grade) in the southeastern part of Orange County, North Carolina. This portion includes most of Chapel Hill (except the small portion of Chapel Hill that is in Durham County), all of Carrboro, and some unincorporated areas, including schools from elementary through high school.

Being near three major universities as well as the Research Triangle Park, it serves one of the best educated populations in the United States. It is financed through property taxes, including a city supplement, as well as state and federal funds. The administrative center is located at Lincoln Center at 750 South Merritt Mill Road. Lincoln Center is the site of the former all-black high school. Services are available for gifted, special needs, and limited English proficiency students. CHCCS has the Learning Environment for Advanced Programing (LEAP), which is an accelerated learning program from the 4th to 8th grades that teaches its students material that is ~1-2 years above their grade level.

== Elementary schools ==
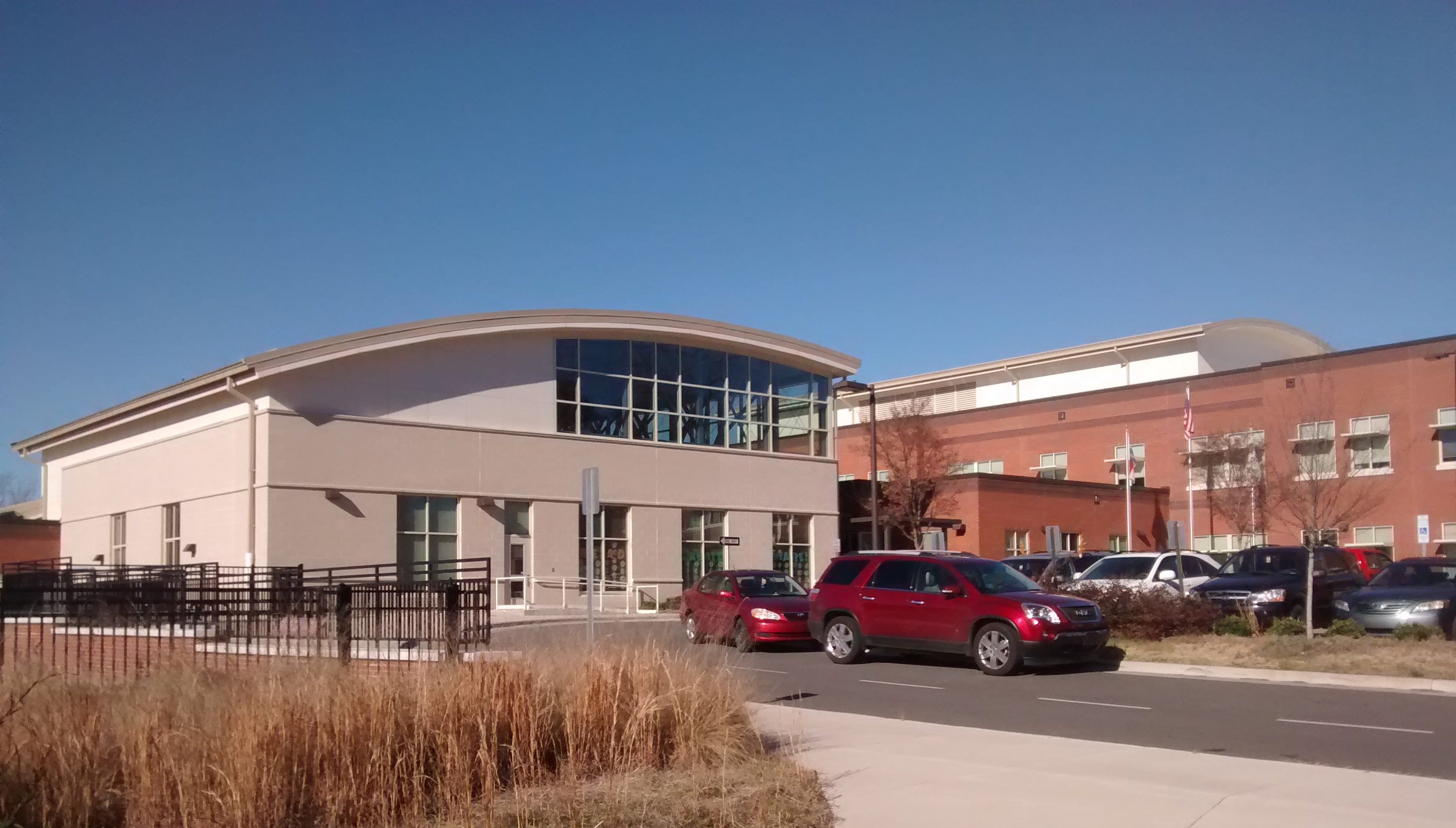
Northside Elementary School

- Carrboro Elementary - Cubs (serving downtown Carrboro and Chapel Hill; Colors: blue and white)
- Ephesus Elementary - Roadrunners (serving Ephesus Road and east Chapel Hill; Colors: red, yellow and white)
- Estes Hills Elementary - Eagles (serving central Chapel Hill around Estes Drive; Colors: green, gold and white)
- Frank Porter Graham Bilingüe School - Winged Lions (serving all of the district; Colors: yellow, maroon and navy blue)
- Glenwood Elementary - Gators (serving east Chapel Hill; Color: green)
- McDougle Elementary - Dolphins (serving central Carrboro; Colors: teal and yellow)
- Morris Grove Elementary - Geckos (serving north Carrboro; Colors: blue and green)
- Rashkis Elementary - Raptors (serving the neighborhood of Meadowmont Village; Colors: purple and yellow)
- Mary Scroggs Elementary School - Frogs (serving the neighborhood of Southern Village; Colors: lime green and white)
- Seawell Elementary - Seahawks (serving northwest and central Chapel Hill, as well as LEAP students; Colors: blue and white)
- Northside Elementary - Navigators (serving Northside, Carrboro neighborhoods; Colors: blue and orange)

== Middle schools ==
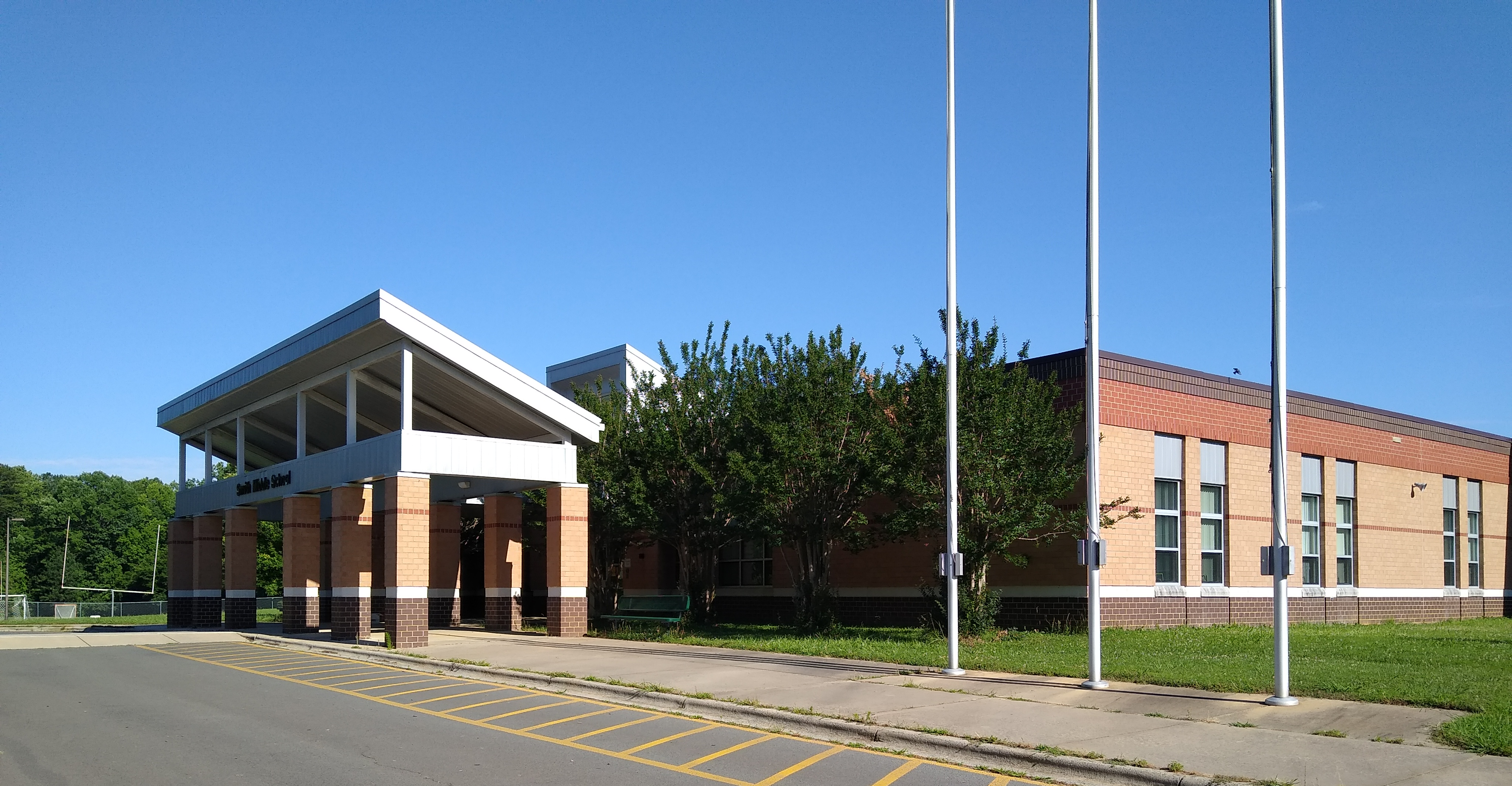
Smith Middle School

- Grey Culbreth Middle School - Cougars (named after wounded warrior PV2 Grey Culbreth, serving 20 percent of southern Chapel Hill; Colors: blue and yellow/gold)
- McDougle Middle School - Mustangs (serving Carrboro; Colors: red and black)
- Phillips Middle School - Falcons (serving central Chapel Hill; Colors: green and white)
- Smith Middle School - Cyclones (serving northern Chapel Hill and Carrboro, as well as LEAP students; Colors: turquoise, white, black and silver)

== High schools ==
The traditional high schools located in the District are:

- Carrboro High School
- Chapel Hill High School
- East Chapel Hill High School

Phoenix Academy High School is an alternative high school for students needing a different environment.

== Academics ==
The Chapel Hill-Carrboro City School District has been called one of the top 37 school districts in the United States and the top performing school district in the Southeast United States. This is according to the criteria of student scores on the SAT, student participation in Advanced Placement courses, and the number of National Merit Scholars.

The district is known for its high quality student scores, especially at the high school level. Two of the currently open high schools, Chapel Hill High and East Chapel Hill High, have been featured as some of the nation's best by the Newsweek Top 100 High Schools, as well as The Wall Street Journal (October 15, 1999). Carrboro High School opened in 2007.

Approximately one-third of the K-12 student population is identified as eligible to receive gifted services.

A 2018 study found that the CHCCS school district has the second highest achievement gap between black and white students in the country.
