= Ben Strong (basketball) =

American basketball player and coach

Personal information
- Born: September 18, 1986 (age 40) Manassas, Virginia, U.S.
- Listed height: 6 ft 11 in (2.11 m)
- Listed weight: 220 lb (100 kg)

Career information
- High school: Chapel Hill (Chapel Hill, North Carolina)
- College: Guilford (2004–2008)
- NBA draft: 2008: undrafted
- Playing career: 2008–2016

Career history

Playing
- 2008–2010: Maccabi Haifa
- 2010: Landstede Zwolle
- 2010–2011: Hapoel Kiryat Tivon
- 2011–2013: Iowa Energy
- 2013–2014: Delaware 87ers
- 2014: Austin Toros
- 2014–2015: Westchester Knicks
- 2015: Atletico Welcome
- 2015: Westchester Knicks
- 2016: Native Pride
- 2016: Nelson Giants

Coaching
- 2016–2018: Huntingdon College (assistant)
- 2018–2019: Philadelphia 76ers (player development)
- 2019–2021: Phoenix Suns (player development)
- 2021–2022: Long Island Nets (player development)

Career highlights
- NABC Division III Co-Player of the Year (2007); 2× First-team Division III All-American – NABC (2007, 2008); 2× ODAC Player of the Year (2007, 2008); 3× First-team All-ODAC (2006–2008)

Benjamin James Strong (born September 18, 1986) is an American basketball coach and a retired professional basketball player. Strong is of Native American descent (Red Lake Band of Chippewa Indians).

== Playing career ==
=== College basketball ===
Born in Manassas, Virginia, Strong grew up in Chapel Hill, North Carolina. After graduating from Chapel Hill High School in 2004, he enrolled at Guilford College, an NCAA Division III school in Greensboro, North Carolina in the Old Dominion Athletic Conference (ODAC). He left Guilford ranked second all-time in scoring (2231) as well as in blocked shots (236) and seventh all-time in rebounding (927), taking home various individual awards during his four-year college career.

Strong won one Old Dominion Athletic Conference (ODAC) championship with Guilford and led the Quakers to two appearances in the NCAA Division III men's basketball tournament. He set an NCAA Division III Tournament record by scoring 59 points in a triple-overtime win over Lincoln University (Pennsylvania) in March 2007.

During his time at Guilford College, Strong was a two-time First-Team Division III All-American (2007, 2008) and was named NCAA Division 3 Player of the Year. He was a three-time First Team All-ODAC, two-time ODAC Player of the Year and two-time Guilford Best Male Athlete. In 2007, he was a NABC First Team All-American (Co-Player of the Year) and a D3hoops.com First Team All-American (Player of the Year).

In 2022, Strong was named to Guilford College's Athletic Hall of Fame. In 2025, Strong was also named to ODAC's inaugural Hall of Fame class.

=== Professional basketball ===
Strong launched his professional career in 2008 with Maccabi Haifa B.C. in the Israeli Premier League. After a stint in the Netherlands and a return to Israel, he took his game to the NBA Development League, where he appeared in a total of 183 regular season (7.7 points, 5.5 rebounds per game) and two post season (20.5 points, 11.5 rebounds per game) contests. In the autumn of 2015, he had a brief stop in Uruguay, playing for Atletico Welcome. In 2016, Strong played in the NBA Summer League for the New York Knicks.

Rounding out his professional career, Strong played his final season in New Zealand with the Nelson Giants and was named Australiabasket.com All-New Zealand NBL Center of the Year.

In 2018, he played for the "We are D3" team at The Basketball Tournament.

== Coaching career ==
After ending his playing career in 2016, Strong was named an assistant men's basketball coach at Huntingdon College in the fall of 2016, before joining the Philadelphia 76ers’ staff as a player development specialist in 2018. On June 26, 2019, he joined the Phoenix Suns' staff as a player development coach.

In 2021, Strong was hired by the Long Island Nets of the NBA G League to serve as their head video coordinator and player development coach.

In 2022, Strong retired from coaching to relocate back to NC.

== Personal life ==
Strong resides in Durham, NC with his wife Lauren and his son.
