= Smith Middle School (Chapel Hill-Carrboro, North Carolina) =

School in Chapel Hill, North Carolina, US

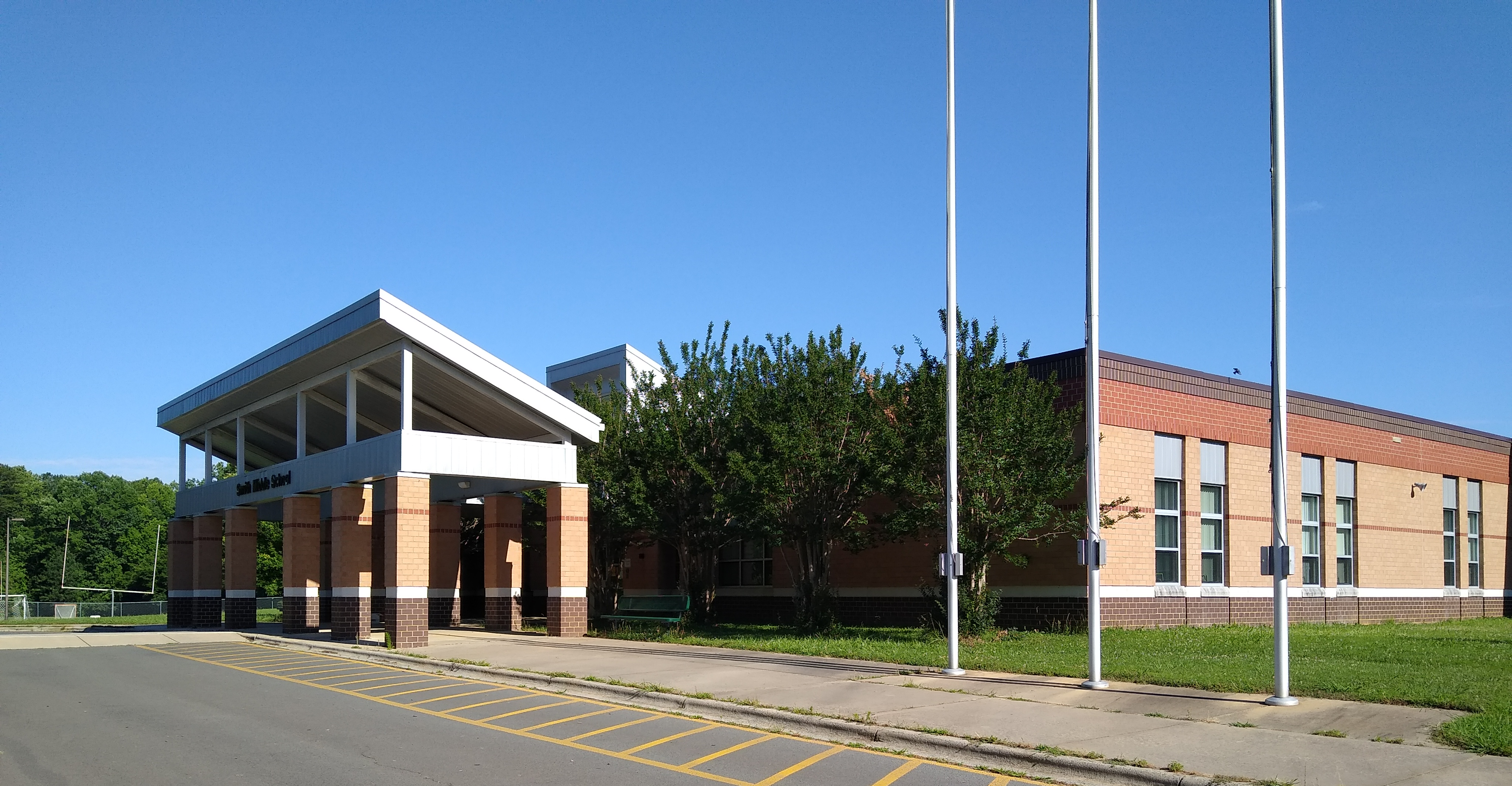

Location
- 1902 Seawell School Road; Chapel Hill, North Carolina; USA; 35.9423°N 79.0774°W

Information
- Type: Middle School
- Established: 2001
- School district: Chapel Hill-Carrboro City Schools
- Principal: Channing Bennet
- Grades: 6-8
- Colors: Turquoise, Black, Silver, White
- Mascot: Cyclone

R. D. and Euzelle P. Smith Middle School (commonly referred to as Smith Middle School and acronymized SMS) is a grades 6-8 public middle school located in Chapel Hill, North Carolina. It's part of the greater Chapel Hill-Carrboro City Schools district, which serves the majority of the two title towns in Orange County. Smith hosts CHCCS's accelerated learning program: Learning Environment for Advanced Programming (LEAP), at a middle school level. Their mascot is a Cyclone, and the school colors are: turquoise, white, black and silver.

== History ==
Smith first opened in 2001. It's named after the couple R.D. and Euzelle P. Smith, who were both educators for the Chapel Hill area from the 1940s to 80s. The couple lived in the Pottersfield neighborhood of Chapel Hill, and wished to bring the African-American heritage of the community to the school.

"Everybody ought to have a knowledge for what the Blacks have contributed to this society...the textbooks don't even a carry a thing about it...I don't intend for that to happen at R.D. Smith and Euzelle B. Smith's Middle School" - R.D. Smith

The school's initial opening was in August, before construction was fully complete. One classroom wing and the auditorium were built a few months after.

== Design ==
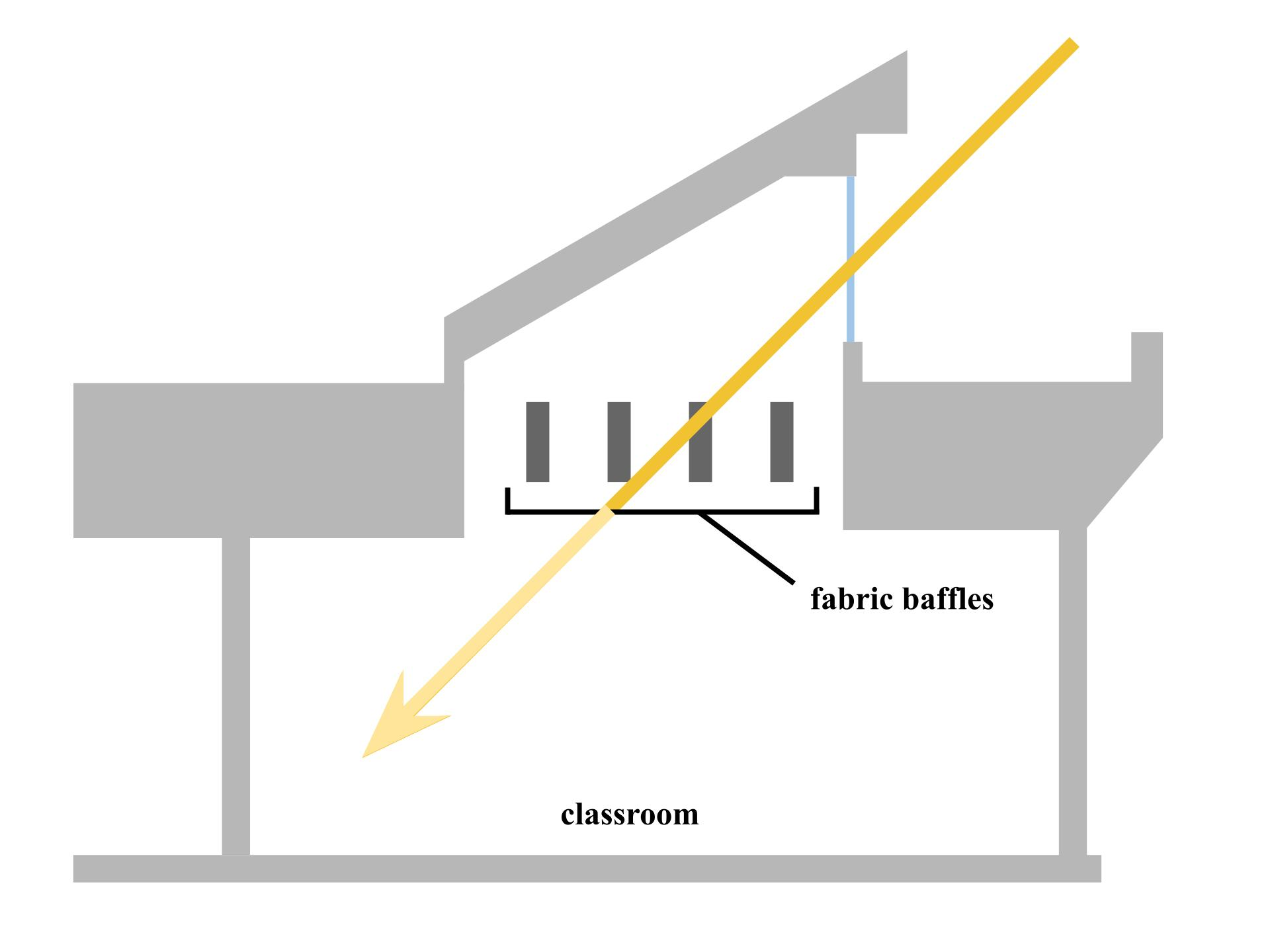
Diagram of the lighting design elements for classrooms at Smith.

The local architectural firm Corley Redfoot Zack designed the school. The school's distinct lighting design features slanted roofs and fabric baffles to control light in the classroom. An extensive case-study on this design element was written in collboration by the Lighting Research Center and Rensselaer Polytechnic Institute three years after construction finished.

== Extracurriculars ==
Notably, Smith has a strong quiz bowl program. The A team was the first to go undefeated and win the 2025 MSNCT, the national championship tournament administered by National Academic Quiz Tournaments. Other Smith teams have also enjoyed success at the state level, including eight state championships.

The Smith Mathcounts team has also won four state championships, including a most recent one in 2026.

Other extracurriculars at the school include: a FTC robotics team, that is 21360 or the ThunderBolts; Model UN; Science Olympiad; The Quill; NJHS; and more that shift on a year-to-year basis.

== Events ==
Smith hosts an annual Global Connections week, a celebration of the diverse culture of the community. Students are encouraged to dress in cultural attire, bring their families, and participate in after-school events throughout the week. Cultural performances take place on Tuesday of the special week, and many students perform with a group or alone. Some popular performances are of The Butterfly Lovers, Indian dancing, Chinese dancing, plays in many of the languages offered at Smith, a lively Eastern European dance, and a prodigious Appalachian fiddler. On the Thursday of Global Connections week, classrooms are usually transformed into different countries. Food is often offered in these classrooms, and the language classrooms become Cafés of different types.
