= University of North Carolina at Chapel Hill student housing =

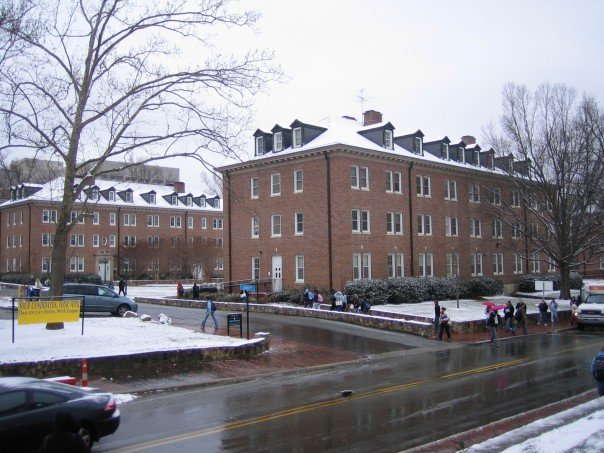
Mangum and Ruffin Halls at UNC–Chapel Hill

Over 8,000 undergraduate and graduate students live in campus housing at the University of North Carolina at Chapel Hill during a regular school year. Forty residence halls are grouped into 16 residential communities across campus.

The University of North Carolina at Chapel Hill is the location of the first dormitory in the United States. Old East, built in 1795, is the university's oldest building and the nation's first university residence hall.

UNC–Chapel Hill's residence halls are typically referred to by their geographical location on campus: Northern, Middle, and Southern.

== North Campus ==
The northern part of campus, between Franklin Street and South Road, contains 20 residence halls in five communities.

=== Kenan Community ===
Spencer

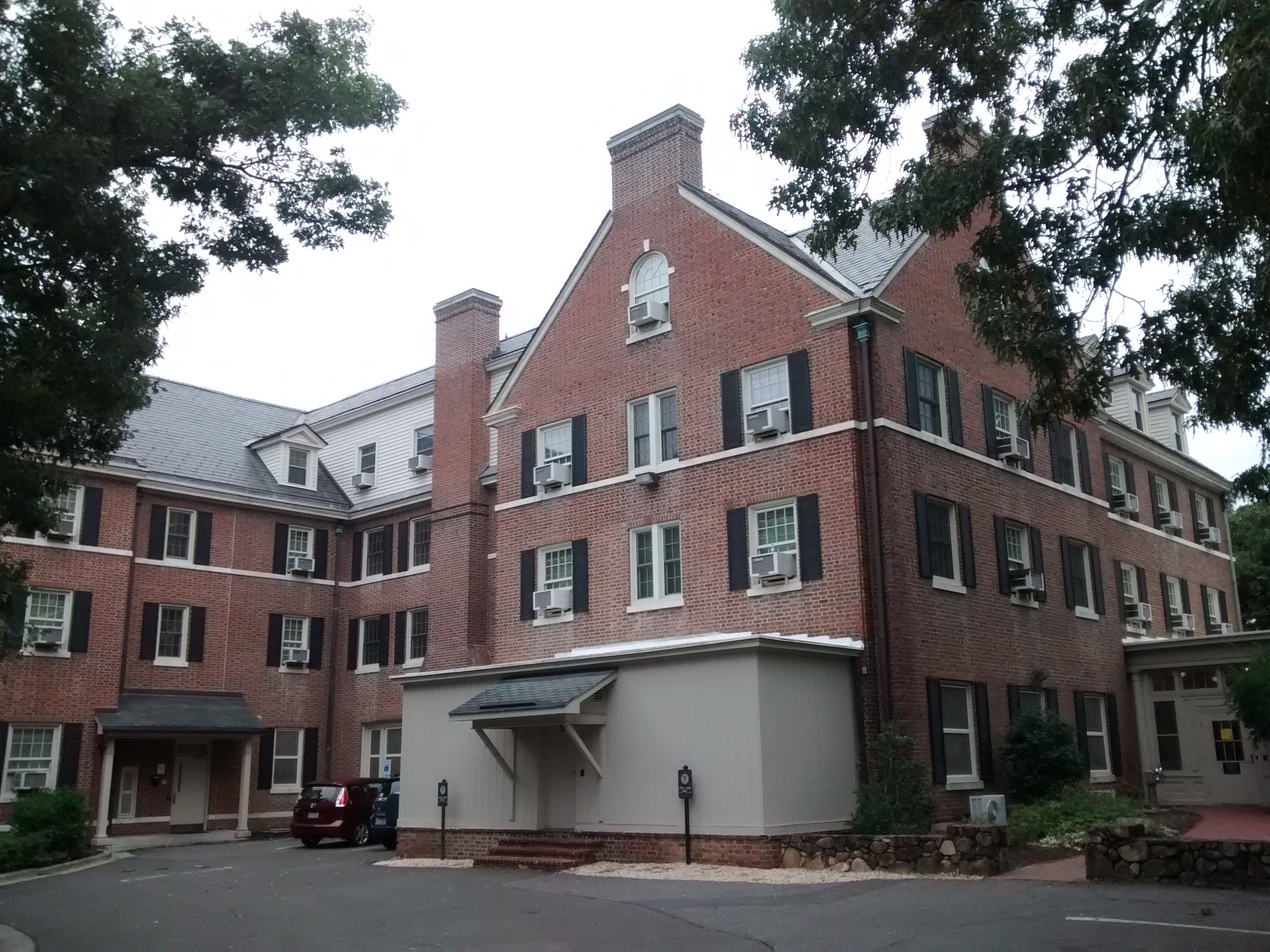
Spencer Residence Hall

Spencer residence hall, built in 1924, is located at the corner of Raleigh St. and Franklin St. Spencer is co-ed and hosts about 150 residents on four floors.

Spencer residence hall is named for Cornelia Phillips Spencer (1825–1908), who moved to UNC-Chapel Hill with her family. Her father, James Phillips, was a mathematics professor. After she married and moved to Alabama with her husband, she moved back to Chapel Hill after his death. She wrote regular columns for The North Carolina Presbyterian and the Raleigh Sentinel. Spencer famously climbed South Building and rang the bell to celebrate the university's reopening after it had closed during Reconstruction. Spencer is buried in the Old Chapel Hill Cemetery and has a collection in Wilson Library’s Southern Historical Collection.

Kenan

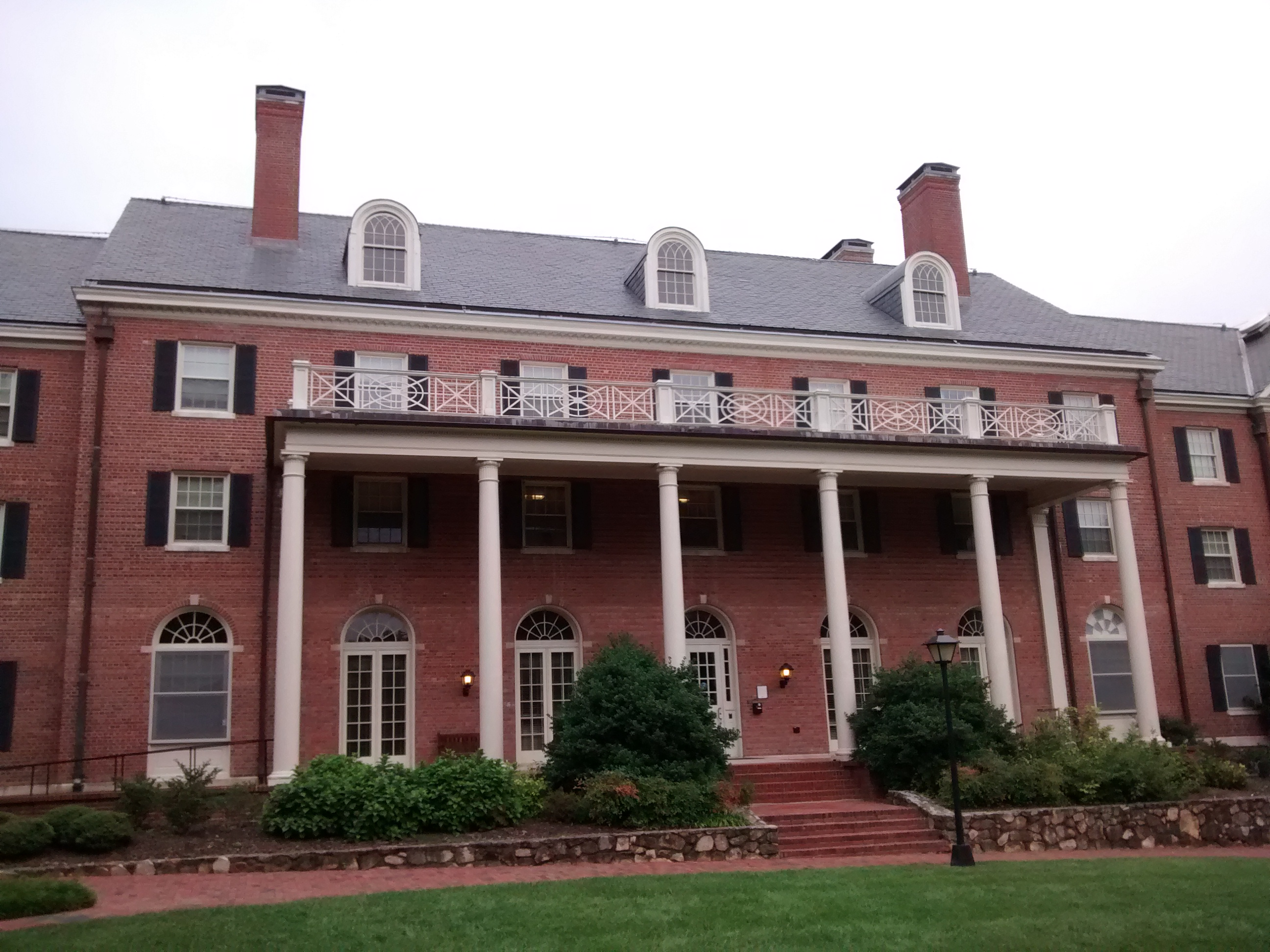
Kenan Residence Hall

Kenan residence hall, built in 1939, is located on Battle Lane in the northeast corner of campus. Kenan is all-female and hosts about 120 residents on three floors.

Kenan is named after Mary Lily Kenan Flagler Bingham (1867–1917), the second wife of George Bingham Sr. and widow of Henry Flagler, both prominent benefactors of UNC. The Kenan-Flagler Business School is also named for Mary Kenan and Henry Flagler. In 1917, she donated $75,000 per year to pay competitive salaries to professors, a donation that helped the university move into the ranks of the nation's leading colleges. Like her brother, William Rand Kenan, Jr., she continued the family's association with the university, which dates back to the 1790s.

Alderman

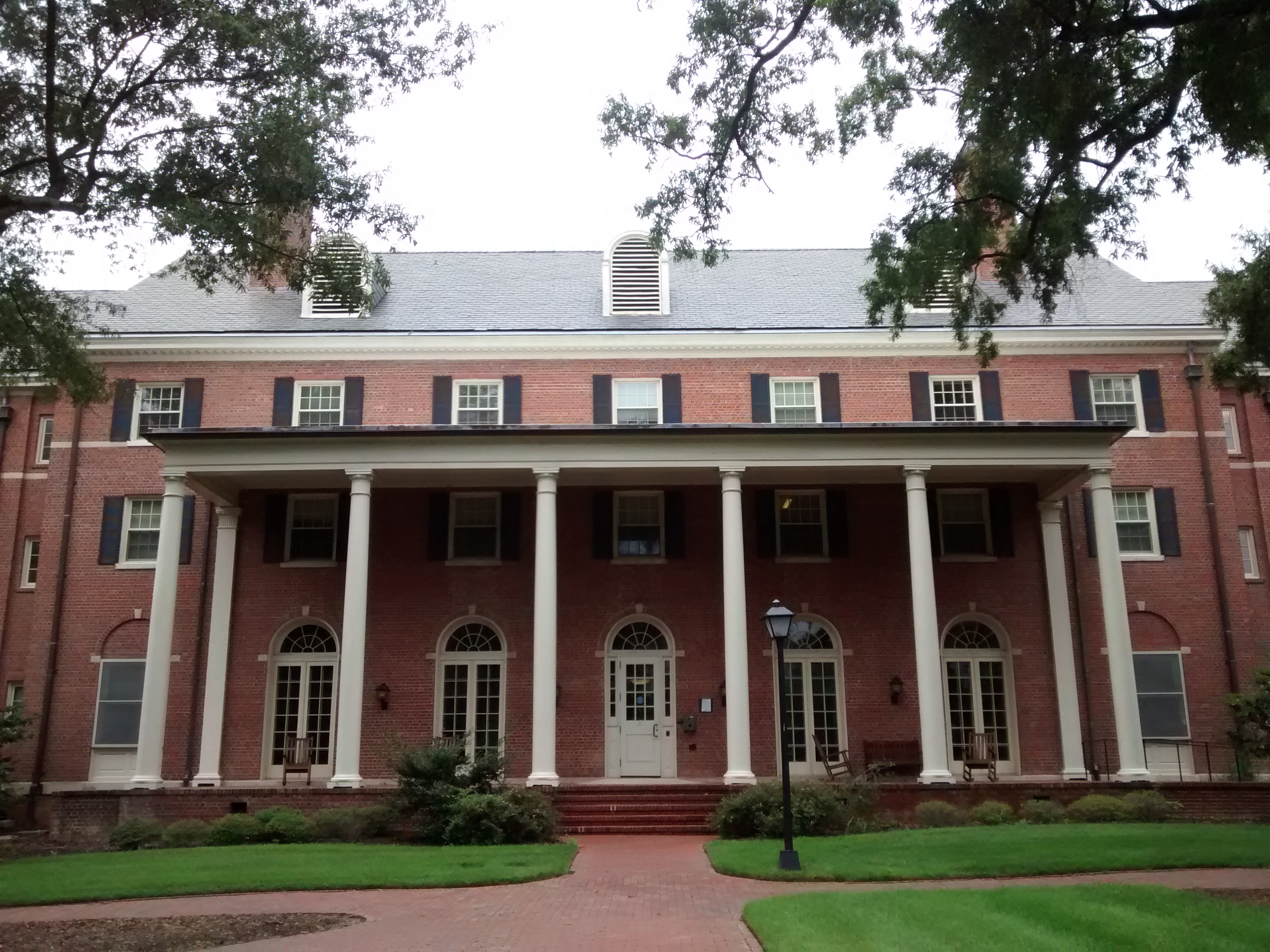
Alderman Residence Hall

Alderman residence hall, built in 1937, is located on Raleigh St. Alderman is co-ed and hosts about 100 residents on three floors.

Alderman residence hall is named after Edwin A. Alderman (1861–1931), a graduate of the class of 1882. Alderman was president of the university from 1896 to 1900 and was known for his reputation as a public education reformer. In 1890 he accepted the presidency of Tulane and completed his career as president of the University of Virginia.

McIver

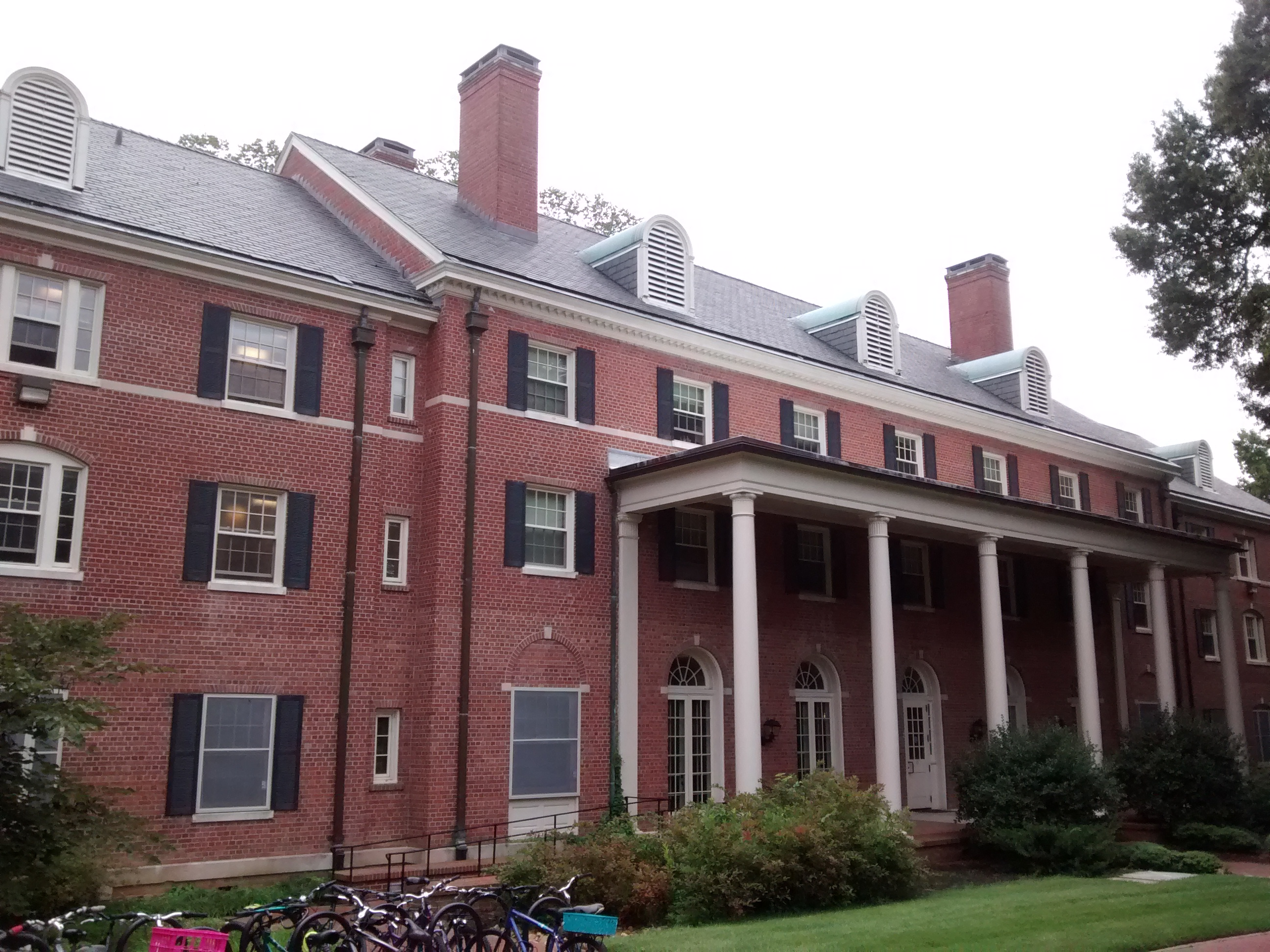
McIver Residence Hall

McIver residence hall, built in 1939, is located on Raleigh St. McIver is co-ed and hosts about 100 residents on three floors. McIver residence hall includes the Living-Learning Community W.E.L.L. (Women's Experiences: Learning and Leadership) which incorporates leadership, involvement, women's issues, learning, citizenship and service.

McIver is named for Charles Duncan McIver (1860–1906), a UNC graduate of the class of 1881. McIver is the founder and first president of the State Normal and Industrial School for Girls, now known as UNC-Greensboro. McIver worked with Charles B. Aycock, James Y. Joyner, and Edwin Alderman to perform leading educational reforms. As a leading advocate for expanding education for women, he was a natural candidate to head the state's first public college for women, a position he held until his death in 1906.

=== Olde Campus Upper Quad ===
Mangum

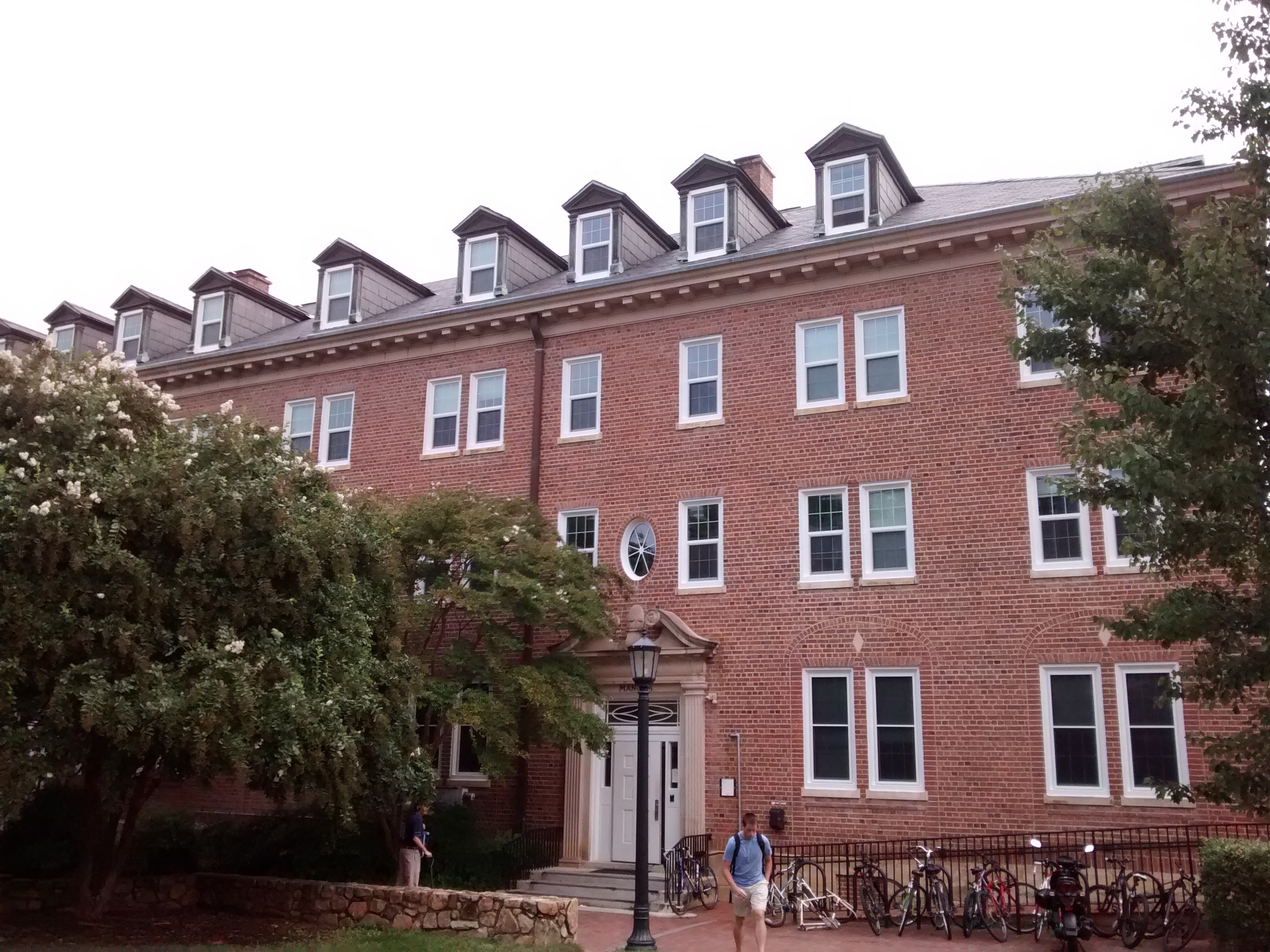
Mangum Residence Hall

Mangum residence hall, built in 1922, is located on Raleigh St. Mangum is coed and hosts about 90 residents on four floors.

Mangum is named after Willie Person Mangum and his cousin Adolphus Williamson Mangum. Willie Mangum (1792–1861), an 1815 graduate of UNC, served in the U.S. House of Representatives from 1823 to 1826 and the Senate during 1831–1837 and 1844–1853. Willie Mangum also served as a university trustee from 1818 to 1859. His cousin Adolphus Williamson Mangum (1834–1890) became a Methodist minister and served as a chaplain in the Confederate Army and as a pastor at churches in Raleigh and Chapel Hill after the war. In 1875, he joined the faculty in the Department of Moral Philosophy, History, and English Literature, where he taught until his death in 1890.

Manly

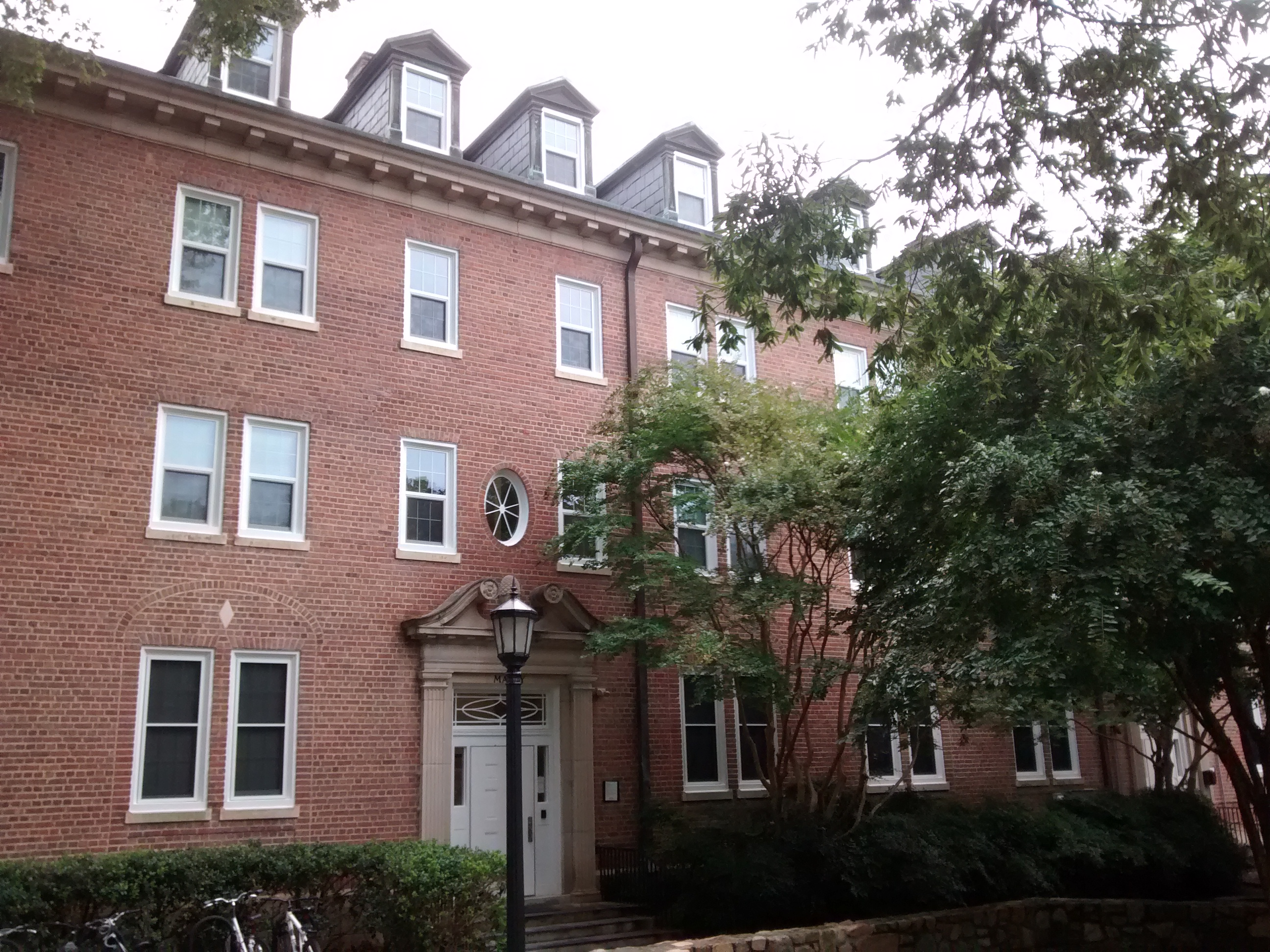
Manly Residence Hall

Manly residence hall, built in 1922, is located on the corner of Raleigh St. and Cameron Ave. Manly is all-female and hosts about 90 residents on four floors. Manly is named after Charles Manly (1795–1871) and his brother, Matthias Manly (1801–1881). Charles graduated from UNC in 1814 and served as a trustee from 1821 to 1849 and 1850 to 1868, gaining a reputation as a supporter of public education and public works. Charles was also a lawyer, politician, slaveholder, and governor of North Carolina from 1849 to 1851. Matthias Manly, class of 1824, was a well-known judge in North Carolina and a trustee of the university from 1874 until 1881.

Ruffin

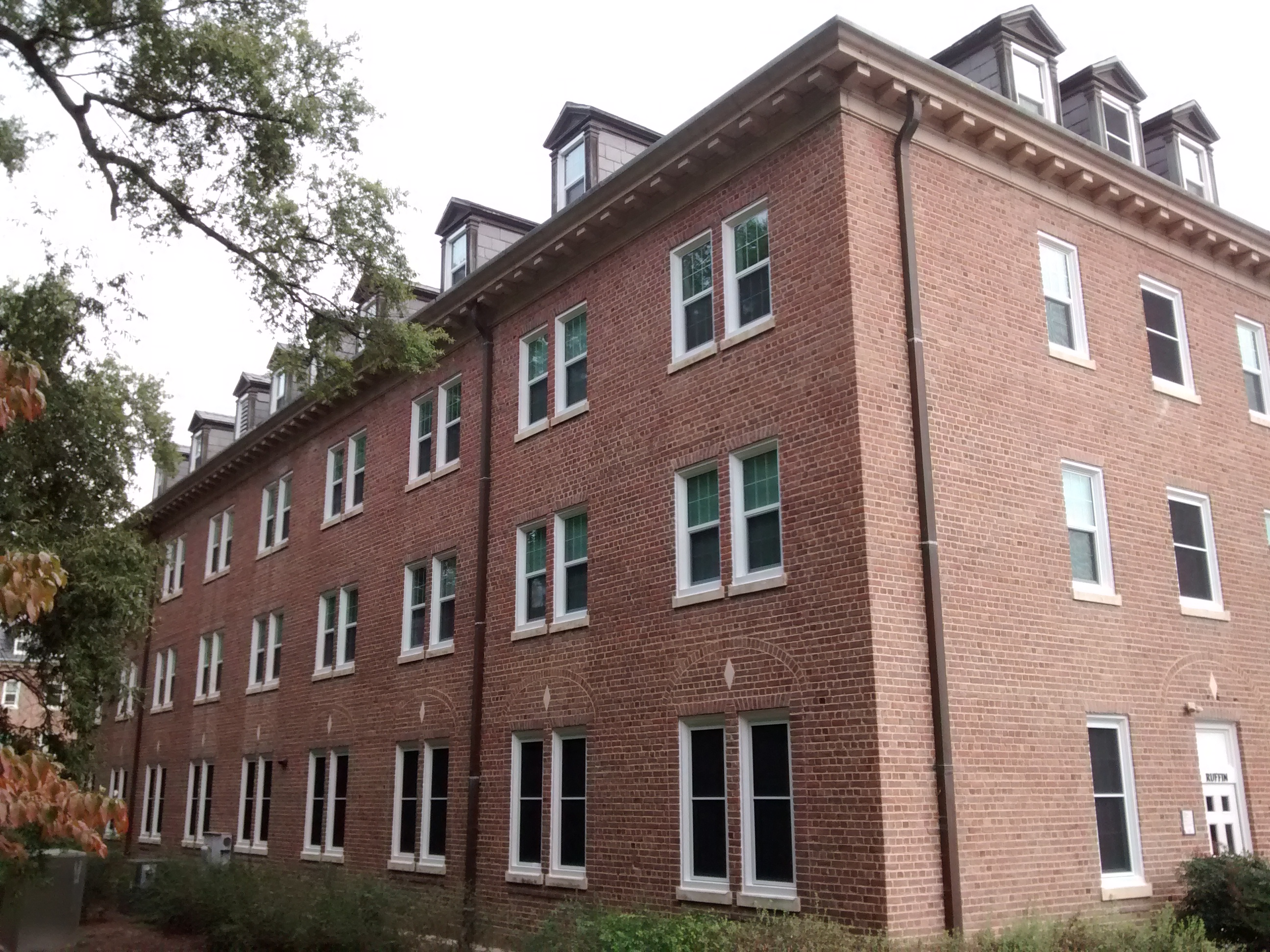
Ruffin Residence Hall

Ruffin residence hall, built in 1922, is located on Emerson Dr Ruffin is co-ed and hosts about 90 residents on four floors.

Since 2020, Ruffin has been named after Thomas Ruffin Jr. (1824–1889), a justice of the North Carolina Supreme Court from 1881 to 1883.

Grimes

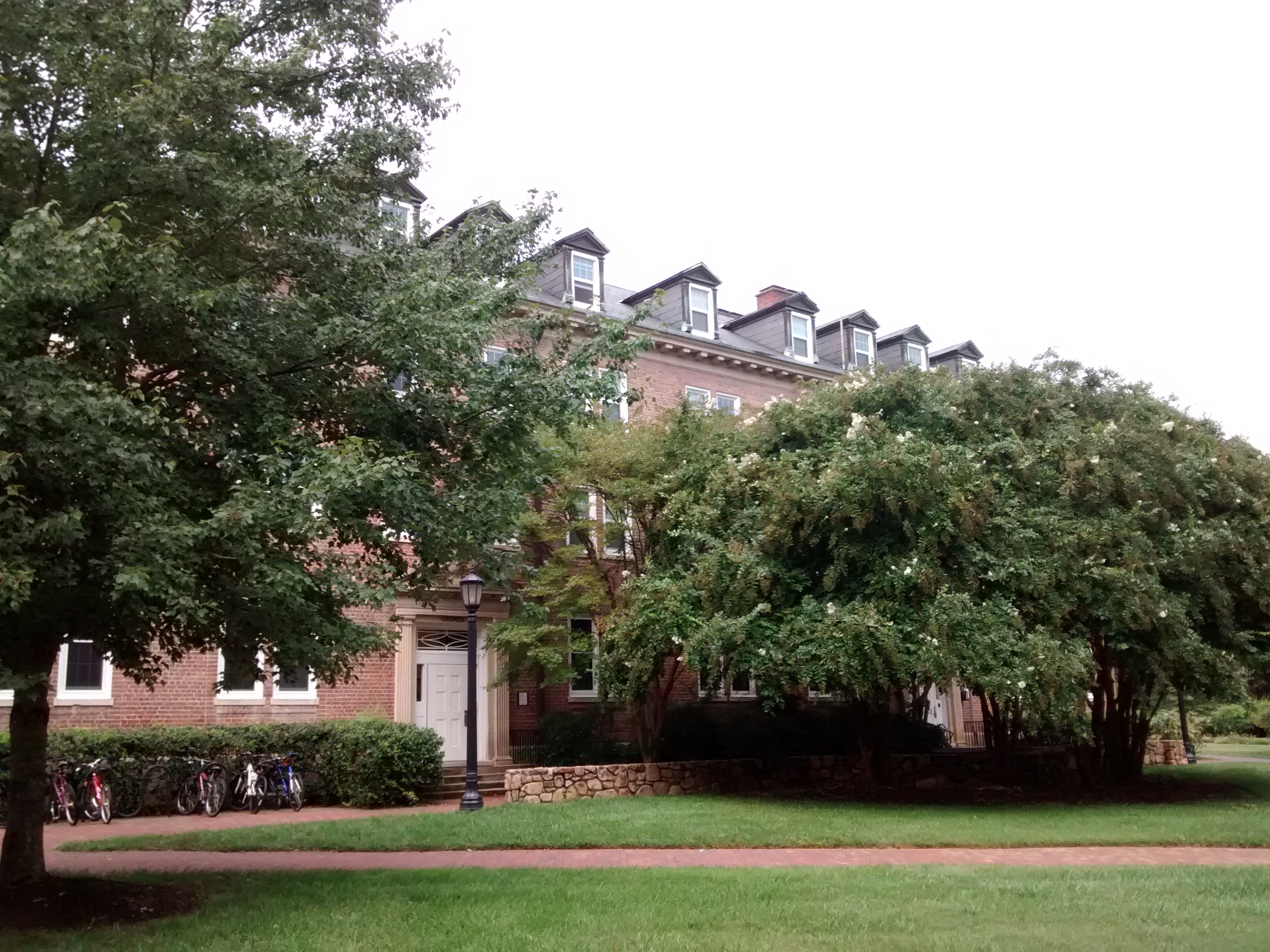
Grimes Residence Hall

Grimes residence hall, built in 1922, is located on Emerson Dr. Grimes is co-ed and hosts about 90 residents on four floors.

Grimes was named after John Bryan Grimes (1868–1923), a planter, politician, trustee, and son of the Confederate major general Bryan Grimes. John Bryan Grimes came to UNC from 1882 to 1884 and then went back to his farm in Pitt County. He played a prominent role in agricultural organizations, including the Farmers' Alliance and the Grange. Grimes served as North Carolina Secretary of State from 1901 to 1923 and oversaw the collection and publication of historical documents and helped start the North Carolina Literary and Historical Association.

Old East

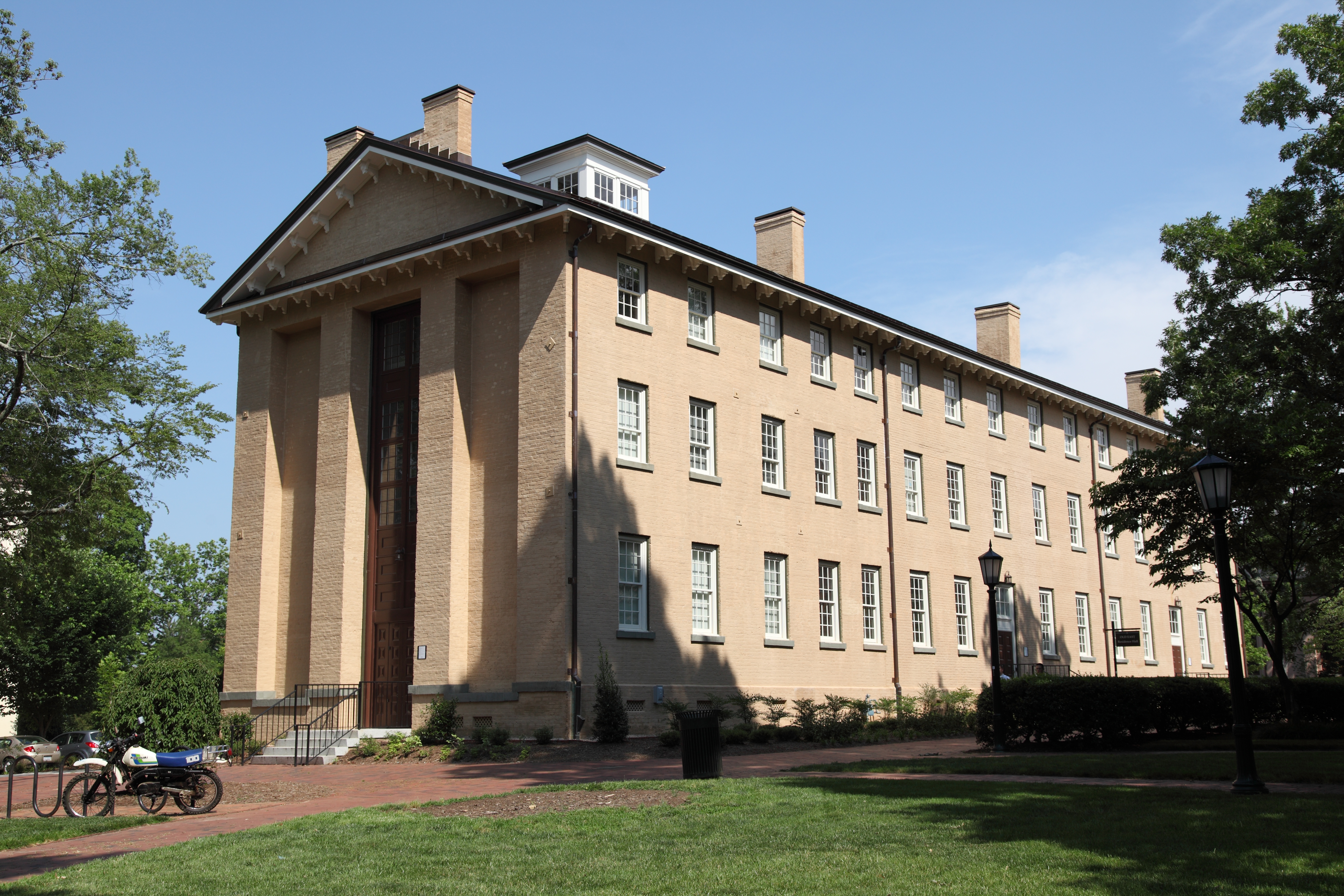
Old East Residence Hall

Old East residence hall, built in 1795, is located on Cameron Ave. Old East is co-ed and hosts about 70 residents on three floors.

Old East was declared a National Historic Landmark as the oldest state university building in America by the National Park Service in 1965. Its cornerstone was laid on October 12, 1793, by William Davie. The trustees chose its location and planned to make it the first section of a three-part structure. Rather than hire an architect, in the custom of the time they designed it themselves and relied on a local contractor to erect it. The trustees deliberately kept the structure austere to save money. In 1822, a third story was added. In 1844, architect Alexander J. Davis lengthened the building and on its north end attached a façade with windows and pilasters.

Old West

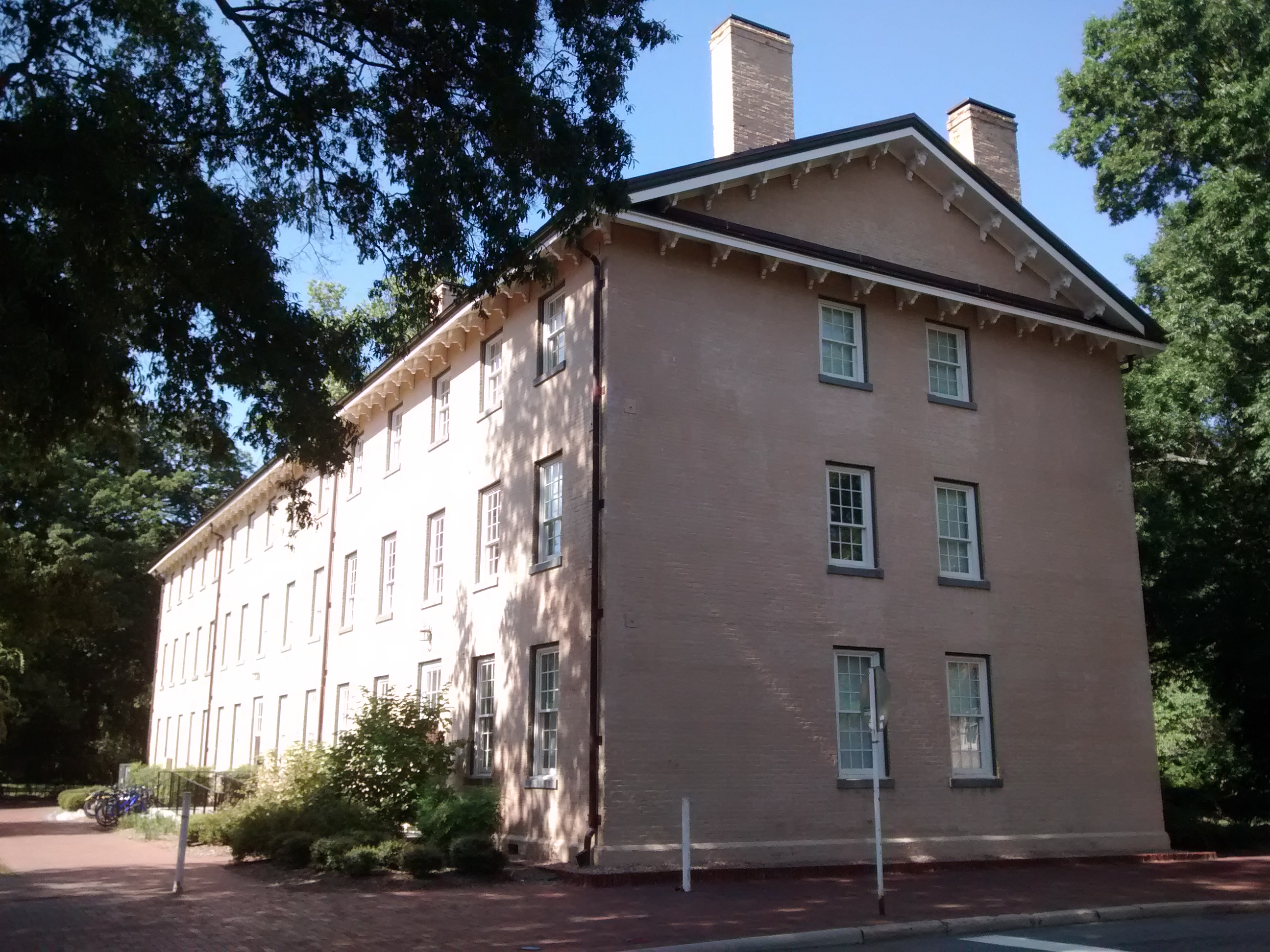
Old West Residence Hall

Old West residence hall, built in 1823, is located on Cameron Ave. Old West is co-ed and hosts about 70 residents on three floors.

William Nichols, one of the first trained architects to work in North Carolina, designed the Old West dormitory. It matched the university's first residence hall, Old East. Nichols added a story to Old East to make it the same height as Old West. In 1844, architect Alexander J. Davis lengthened the building and on its north end attached a façade with windows and pilasters.

=== Olde Campus Lower Quad ===
McClinton Residence Hall (Formerly Aycock Residence Hall)

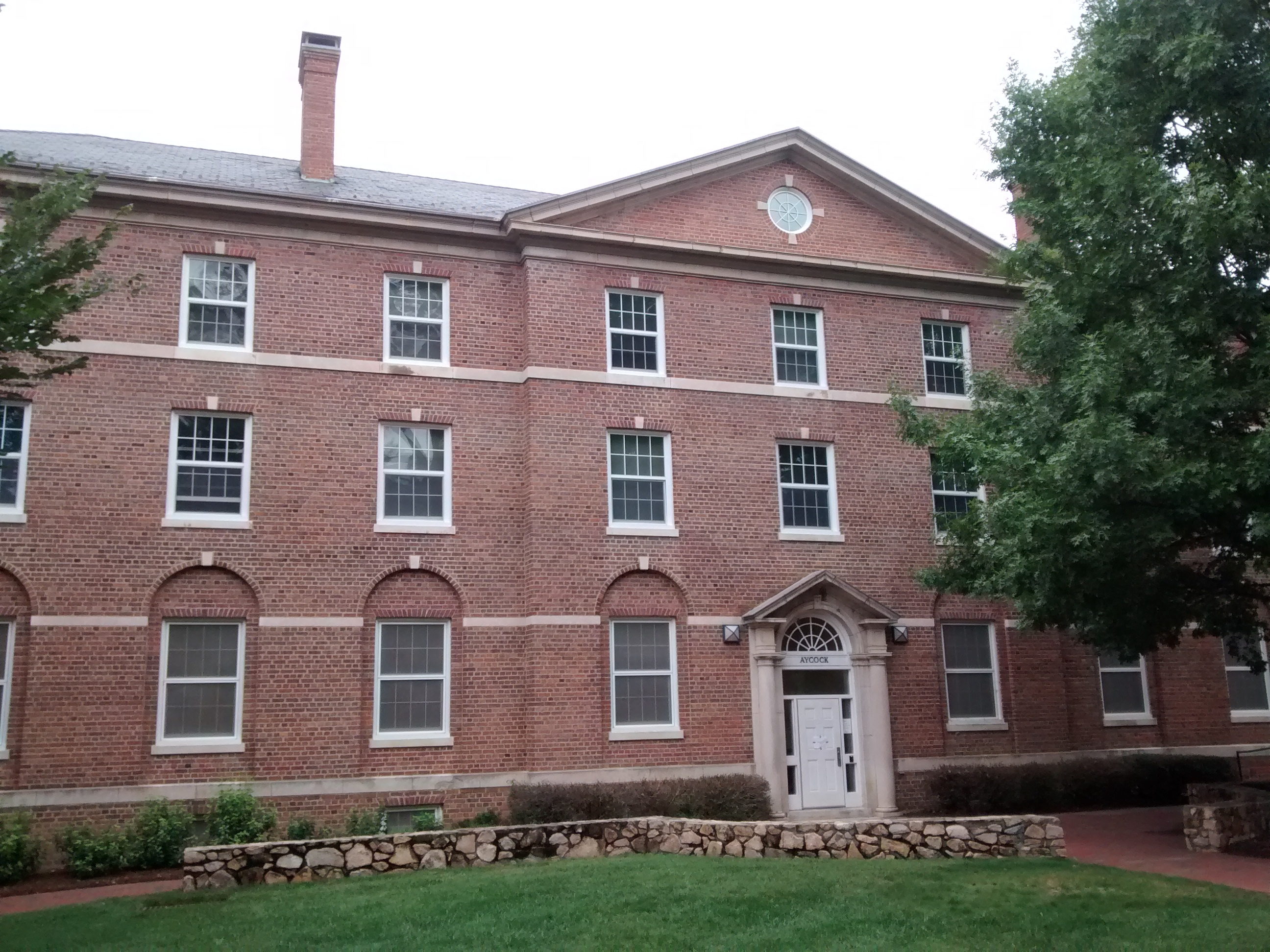
McClinton Residence Hall (before renaming)

McClinton Residence Hall, built in 1924, is located on the corner of Country Club Rd and Raleigh St. The building is all-female and hosts about 100 residents on three floors.

McClinton Residence Hall was formerly named after Charles Brantley Aycock (1859–1912) from the class of 1880. He was the superintendent of Jayne Couth schools and was an attorney. He became the governor of North Carolina from 1901 to 1905. Due to Aycock's ties with white supremacy, UNC renamed the building to Residence Hall One in 2020 before renaming it on honour of Hortense McClinton (born 1918), the campus's first African American faculty member.

Graham

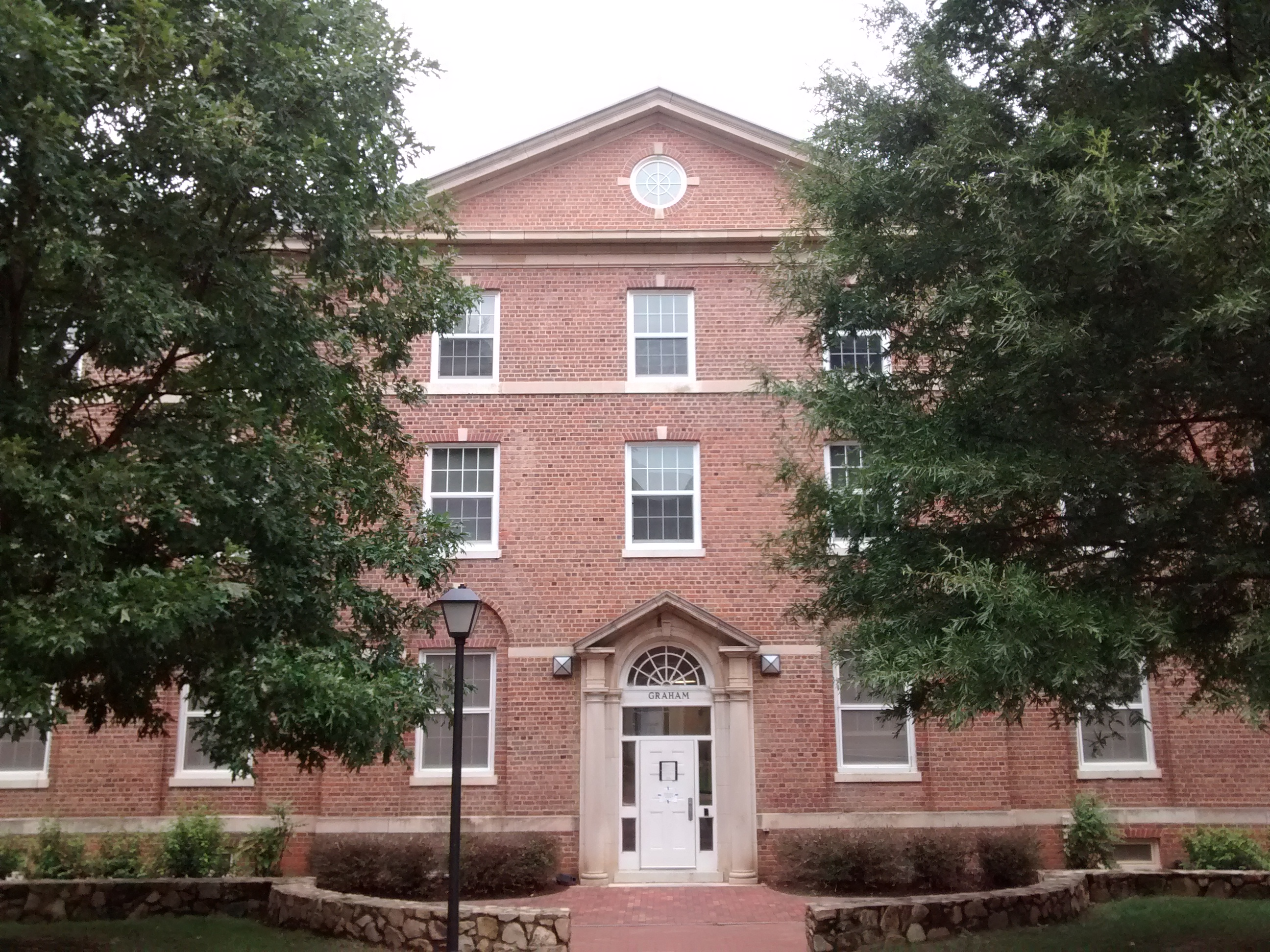
Graham Residence Hall

Graham residence hall, built in 1924, is located on Country Club Rd. Graham is all-male and hosts about 90 residents on three floors. McClinton and Graham residence halls are connected by lounges and a breezeway.

Graham was named for John Washington Graham (1838–1928) of the class of 1857. He married Rebecca Cameron, the daughter of another prominent university supporter and North Carolina's largest slaveholder, Paul Cameron. In 1870–1871, he helped other Conservatives impeach and convict Republican governor W. W. Holden for using the militia to stop Ku Klux Klan violence. He served as a trustee of the university from 1876 until he died in 1928.

Stacy

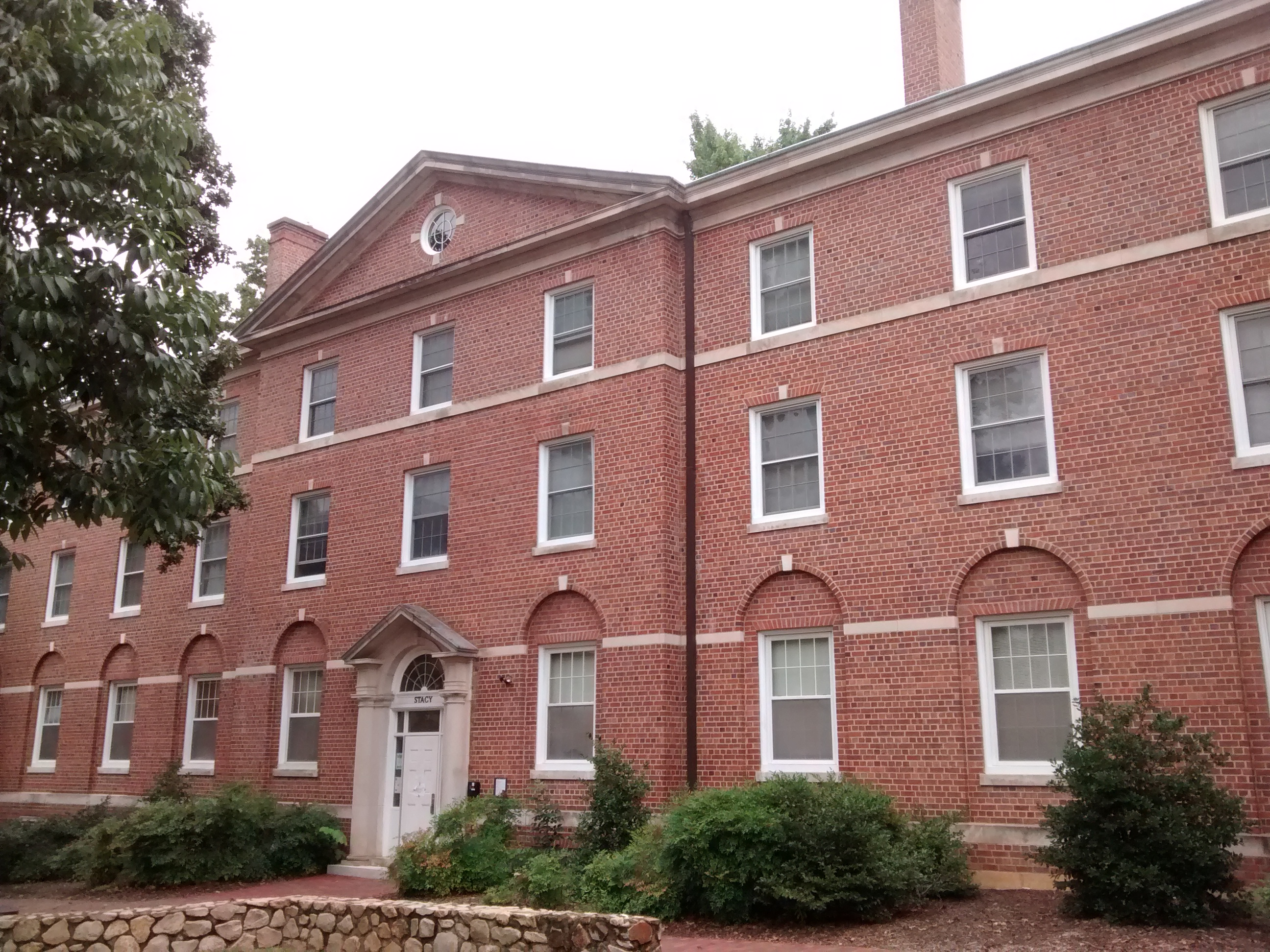
Stacy Residence Hall

Stacy residence hall, built in 1938, is located on Country Club Rd. Stacy is co-ed and hosts about 90 residents on three floors. Stacy has corridor-style hallways, two stairwells, a kitchen with an ice machine, a TV room, lounges, and vending machines. The building is equipped with smoke detectors, alarms, and central air-conditioning.

Stacy is named for Marvin Hendrix Stacy (1887–1919), a UNC-Chapel Hill graduate of the class of 1902. He also was a professor of mathematics, dean of the College of Arts and Sciences, chairman of the faculty of the university, and president of the university for a year before his death from the influenza pandemic. He has a collection in Wilson Library's Southern Historical Collection.

Lewis

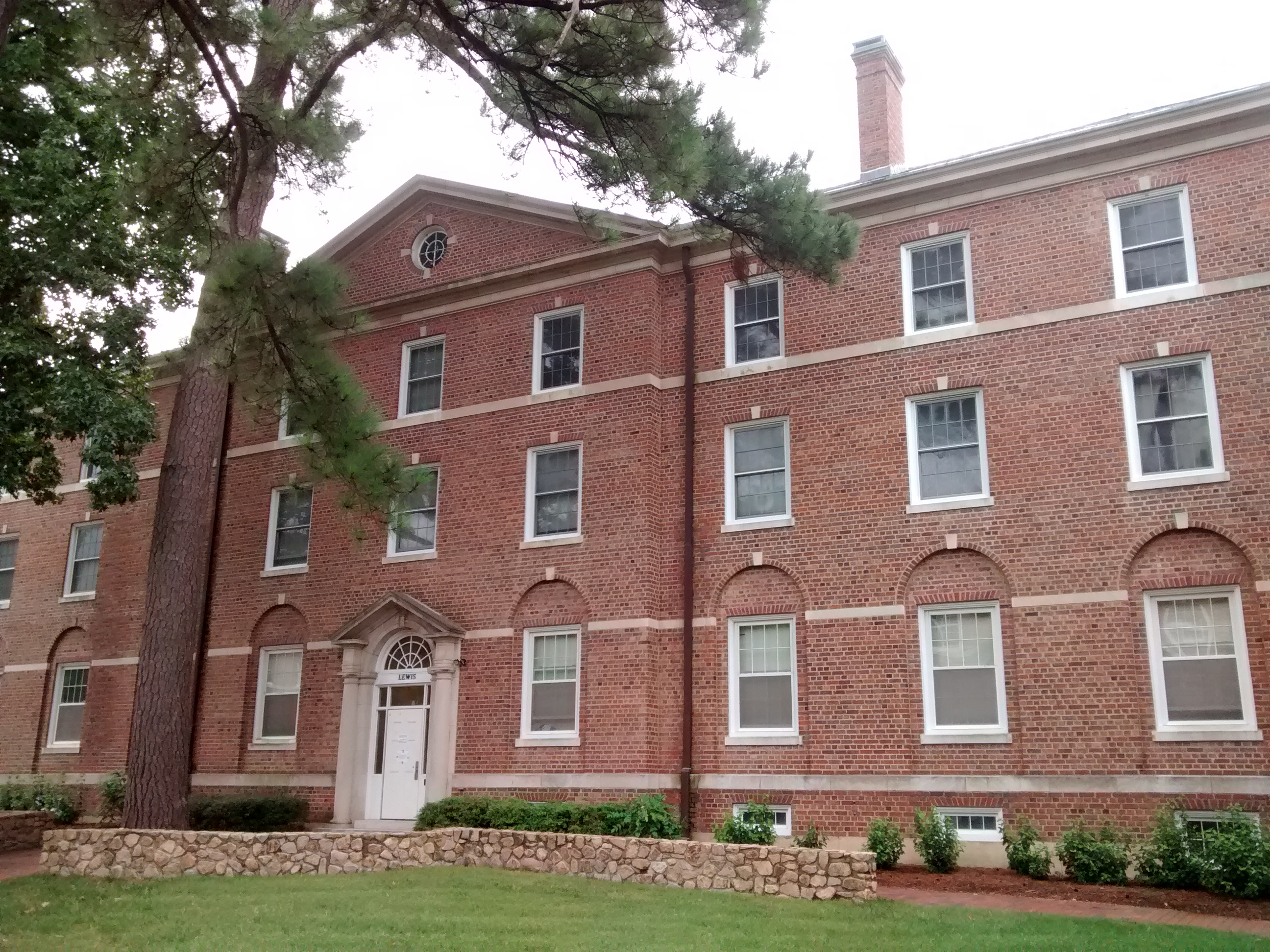
Lewis Residence Hall

Lewis residence hall, built in 1924, is located on Raleigh St. Lewis is co-ed and hosts about 95 residents on three floors. Lewis has corridor-style hallways, a kitchen with an ice machine, a TV room, lounges, and vending machines. The building is equipped with smoke detectors, alarms, and central air-conditioning.

Lewis is named for Dr. Richard Henry Lewis (1850–1926). He came to UNC for two years before it closed during the Reconstruction period. He continued his education at the University of Virginia and received his M.D. from the University of Maryland. He opened an office in Raleigh in 1877 and was the secretary of the North Carolina State Board of Health from 1892 to 1909. In that office, he began regular examinations of public water supplies, a sanitary engineering service, and programs for protecting children from epidemics.

Everett

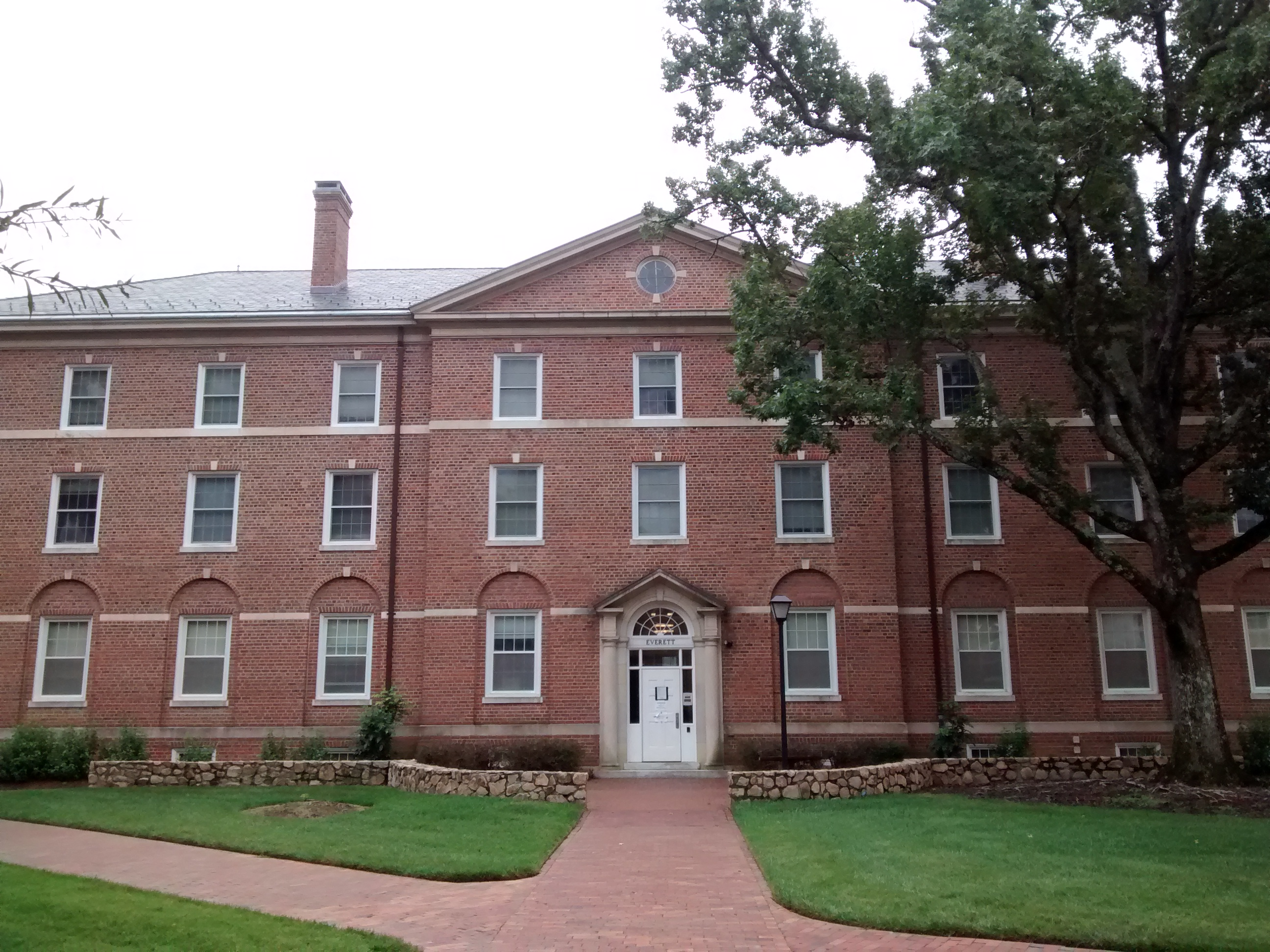
Everett Residence Hall

Everett residence hall, built in 1928, is located on Raleigh Street. Everett is co-ed and hosts about 95 residents on three floors. Everett has corridor-style hallways, a kitchen with an ice machine, a TV room, lounges, and vending machines. The building is equipped with smoke detectors, alarms, and central air-conditioning.

Everett is named after William Nash Everett (1864–1928), a UNC graduate of the class of 1886. Everett served as Secretary of State in North Carolina from 1923 until 1928. He served in the Senate and House of Representatives in the 1920s and was a university trustee. He was a banker, farmer, and businessman as well as an endorser of woman suffrage and state aid for highways.

=== Connor Community ===
Winston

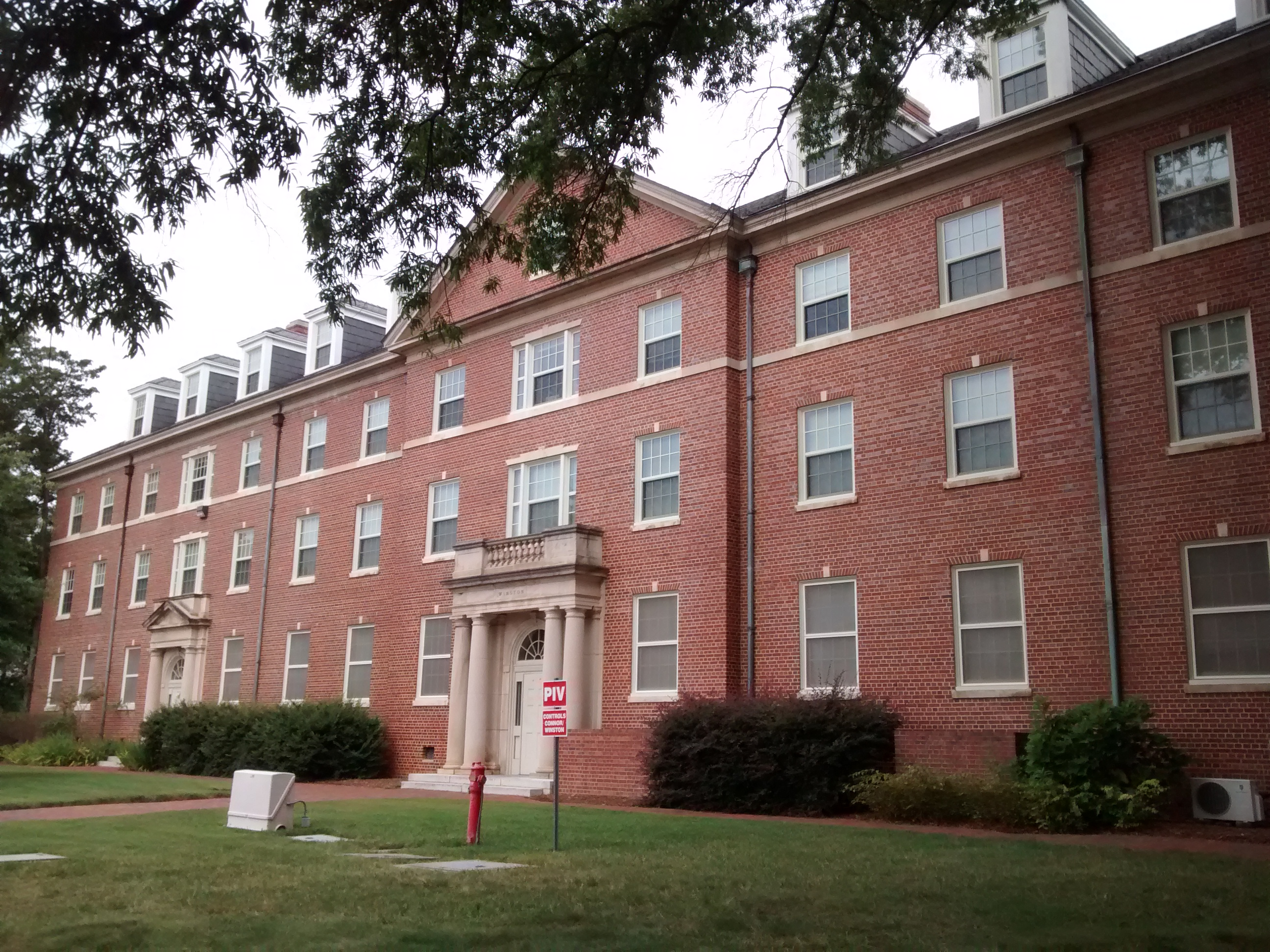
Winston Residence Hall

Winston residence hall, built in 1948, is located on South Rd. Winston is co-ed and hosts about 170 residents on four floors. Winston has corridor-style hallways, multiple stairwells, an elevator, a kitchen with an ice machine, a TV room, lounges, and vending machines. The building is equipped with smoke detectors, alarms, and central air-conditioning.

Winston is named after George Tayloe Winston (1852–1932), former UNC president (1891–1896). He taught Latin and German until he became president in 1891. Under his presidency, the number of students at UNC tripled. In 1896, he left UNC to become the president of the University of Texas, returning in 1899 to be the head of the North Carolina College of Agriculture and Mechanical Arts, now called North Carolina State University.

Connor

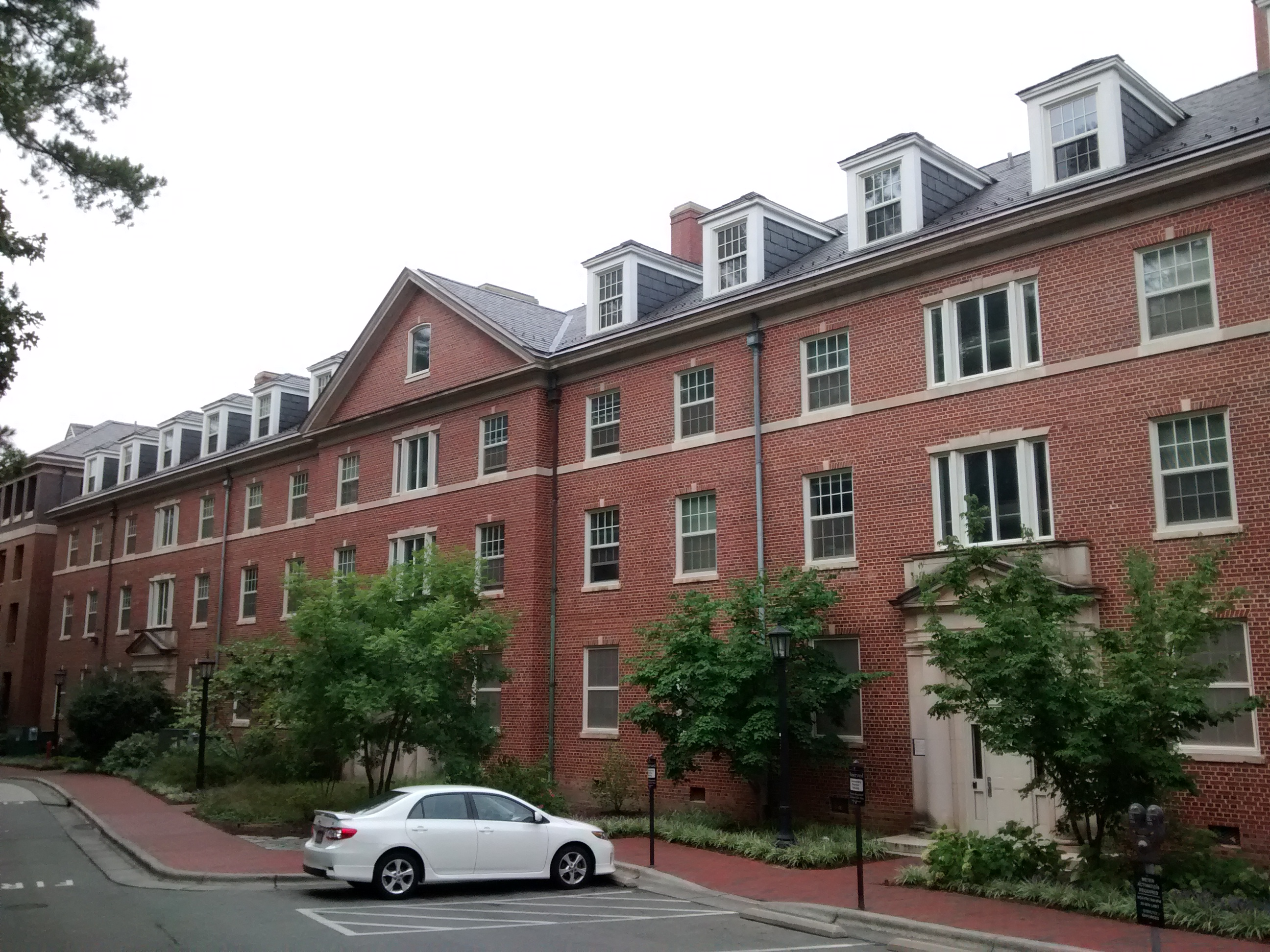
Connor Residence Hall

Connor residence hall, built in 1948, is located on Raleigh St. Connor is co-ed and hosts about 175 residents on four floors. Connor has corridor-style hallways, multiple stairwells, an elevator, a kitchen with an ice machine, a TV room, lounges, a recreation room, and vending machines. The building is equipped with smoke detectors, alarms, and central air-conditioning units.

Connor residence hall is named after Robert Digges Wimberly Connor (1878–1950), an 1899 UNC graduate. He organized the state's first historical archives and headed it from 1907 to 1920. Connor was appointed to the university's board of trustees in 1913 and became a close associate of President Edward Kidder Graham. He joined the university's history faculty in 1921 as a Kenan professor. In 1934, President Franklin Roosevelt appointed him as the first head of the national archives. In 1941, he returned to UNC to teach; he retired in 1949. The university trustees twice considered him for president; once when Graham died in 1918 and then again in the late 1920s when President Harry W. Chase resigned.

Alexander

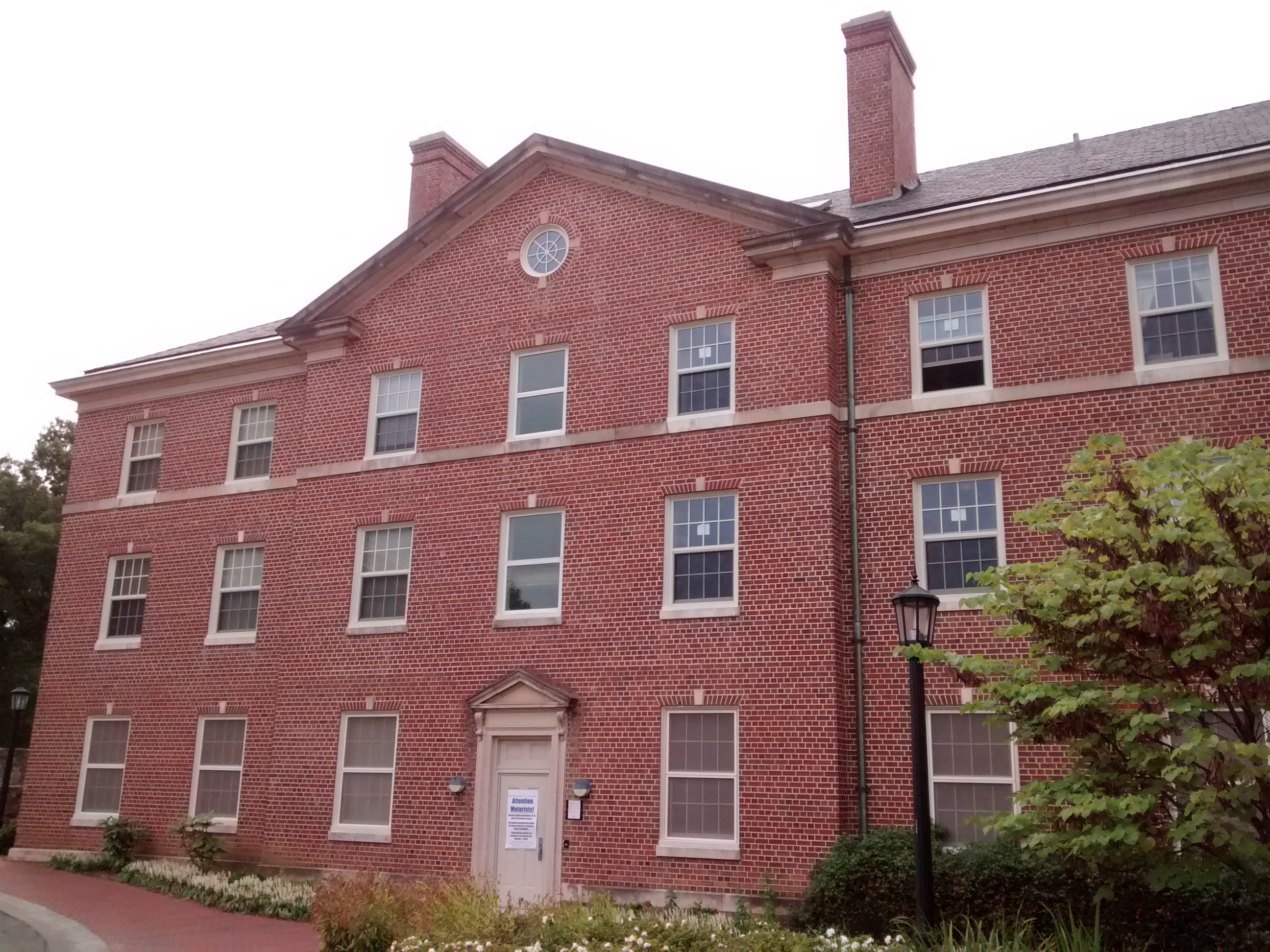
Alexander Residence Hall

Alexander residence hall, built in 1939, is located on Raleigh St. Alexander is co-ed and hosts about 100 residents on three floors. Alexander has corridor-style hallways, multiple stairwells, an elevator, a kitchen with an ice machine, a TV room, lounges, and vending machines. The building is equipped with smoke detectors, alarms and central air-conditioning.

Alexander is named after Eben Alexander (1851–1910), a longtime UNC professor. He came to UNC to teach Greek in 1886 after graduating from Yale. He left the campus in 1893 when President Grover Cleveland appointed him minister to Greece, Serbia, and Romania. After his return to Chapel Hill, President Francis Venable appointed him the first dean of the faculty in 1900. Following his death in 1910, his widow presented the university with four hundred classical volumes from his library.

Joyner

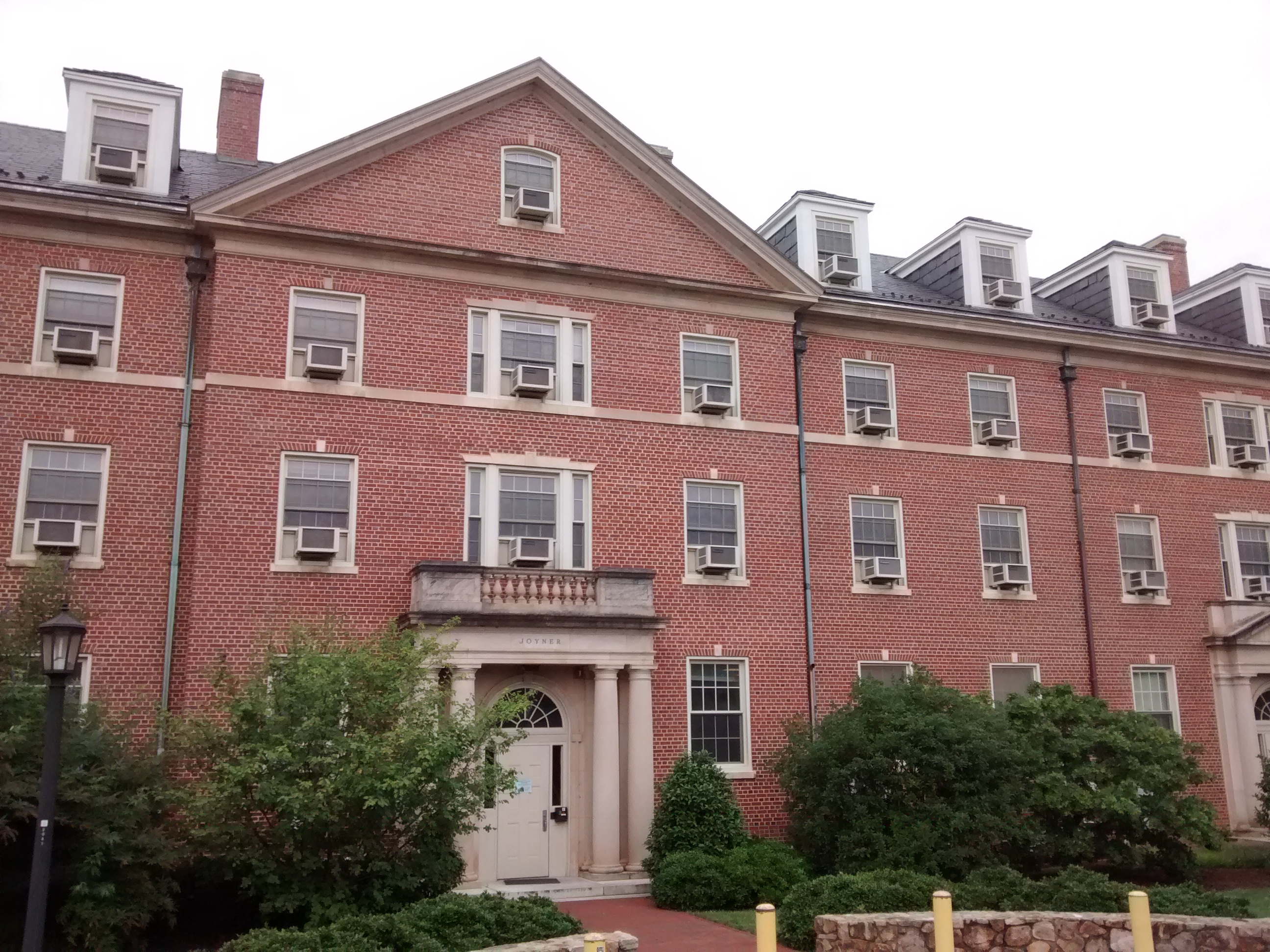
Joyner Residence Hall

Joyner residence hall, built in 1947, is located on Raleigh St. Joyner is co-ed and hosts about 170 residents on four floors. Joyner has corridor-style hallways, multiple stairwells, an elevator, a kitchen with an ice machine, a TV room, lounges, vending machines, and a laundry room. The building is equipped with smoke detectors, alarms and central air-conditioning. Joyner participates in the Living-Learning Community: Substance Free. A substance-free environment means that the residents pledge that they (including their guests) will not possess or use any substances, including alcohol, tobacco, marijuana, or any other illegal drugs in the residence hall.

Joyner is named after James Yadkins Joyner (1862–1954), a graduate of UNC's class of 1881. Joyner began his career as a schoolteacher and a local superintendent of schools. In 1893, he joined McIver in Greensboro as a teacher of English and dean of the faculty at the state's first college for women, now known as the University of North Carolina at Greensboro. Aycock appointed him superintendent of North Carolina's public schools in 1902, a position Joyner held until 1919. During his tenure, the state established a high school system, began to certify teachers, extended the school term, and instituted compulsory attendance.

=== Cobb Community ===
Cobb

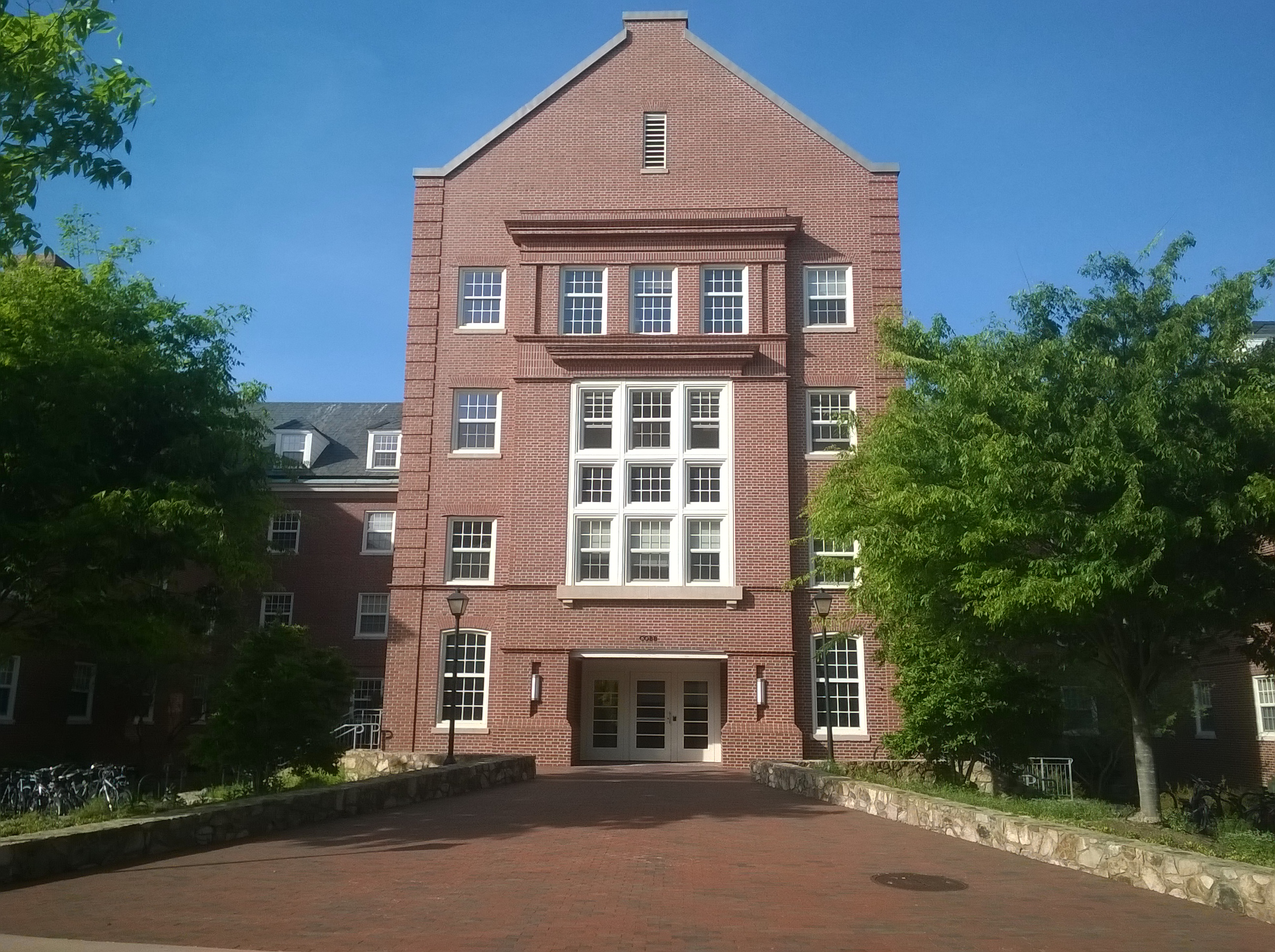
Cobb Residence Hall

Cobb residence hall, built in 1952 and renovated in 2005, is located on Country Club Rd. Cobb is co-ed and hosts about 400 residents on four floors. Cobb has corridor-style hallways, elevators, stairwells, a kitchen with an ice machine, a TV room, lounges on each floor, vending machines, a recreation room and a laundry room. The building is equipped with smoke detectors, alarms and central air-conditioning. Cobb is host to a Living-Learning Community, Connected Learning Program, which promotes experiential and academic learning with other students from different backgrounds.

Cobb is named after Collier Cobb (1862–1934) a UNC graduate from the class of 1880. He taught at the Massachusetts Institute of Technology and Boston University after receiving his B.A. and M.A. from Harvard University. In 1892 he became a professor of geology at UNC and later became the first chairman of the Department of Geology from 1893 to 1934. He was elected into the Association of American Geographers in 1906.

== Mid Campus ==
Mid Campus contains four residence halls in two different communities.

=== Carmichael Community ===
Carmichael

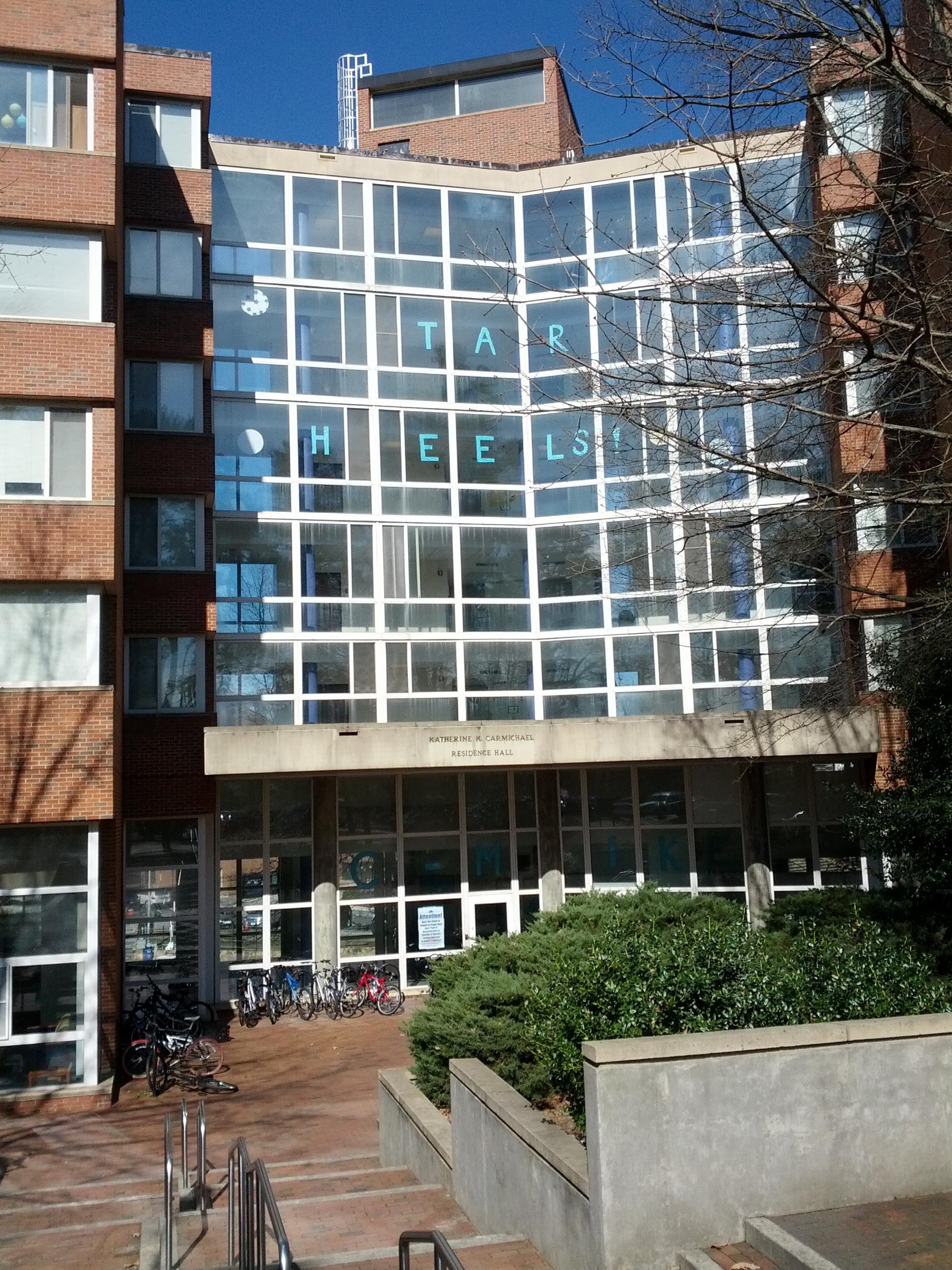
Carmichael Residence Hall

Carmichael was built in 1986 and can house a total of 485 residents. It is a part of the Carmichael Community, previously the Carmichael-Whitehead Community. There are 10 resident advisors in Carmichael's six floors which are occupied by both male and female residents. Carmichael is suite style with interior corridor access as opposed to Morrison, Hinton James, Craige and Ehringhaus which have outdoor corridor access. Carmichael has study rooms, kitchens, lounges, vending machines, ice machines a laundry room, a recreation room and a TV room available to all residents. Carmichael also has a Ballroom, a large open meeting place and the "fishbowl," a smaller television lounge and meeting space, which are unique to this hall. The residence hall was renovated in the summer of 2008.

Carmichael is named after Katherine Kennedy Carmichael, the first dean of women. Under her administration, from 1946 to 1972, the number of female students at the university increased dramatically and Carmichael worked hard to support the female students. The increase in students led to a shortage of women's residence halls and so Carmichael was built.

=== Parker Community ===
Parker

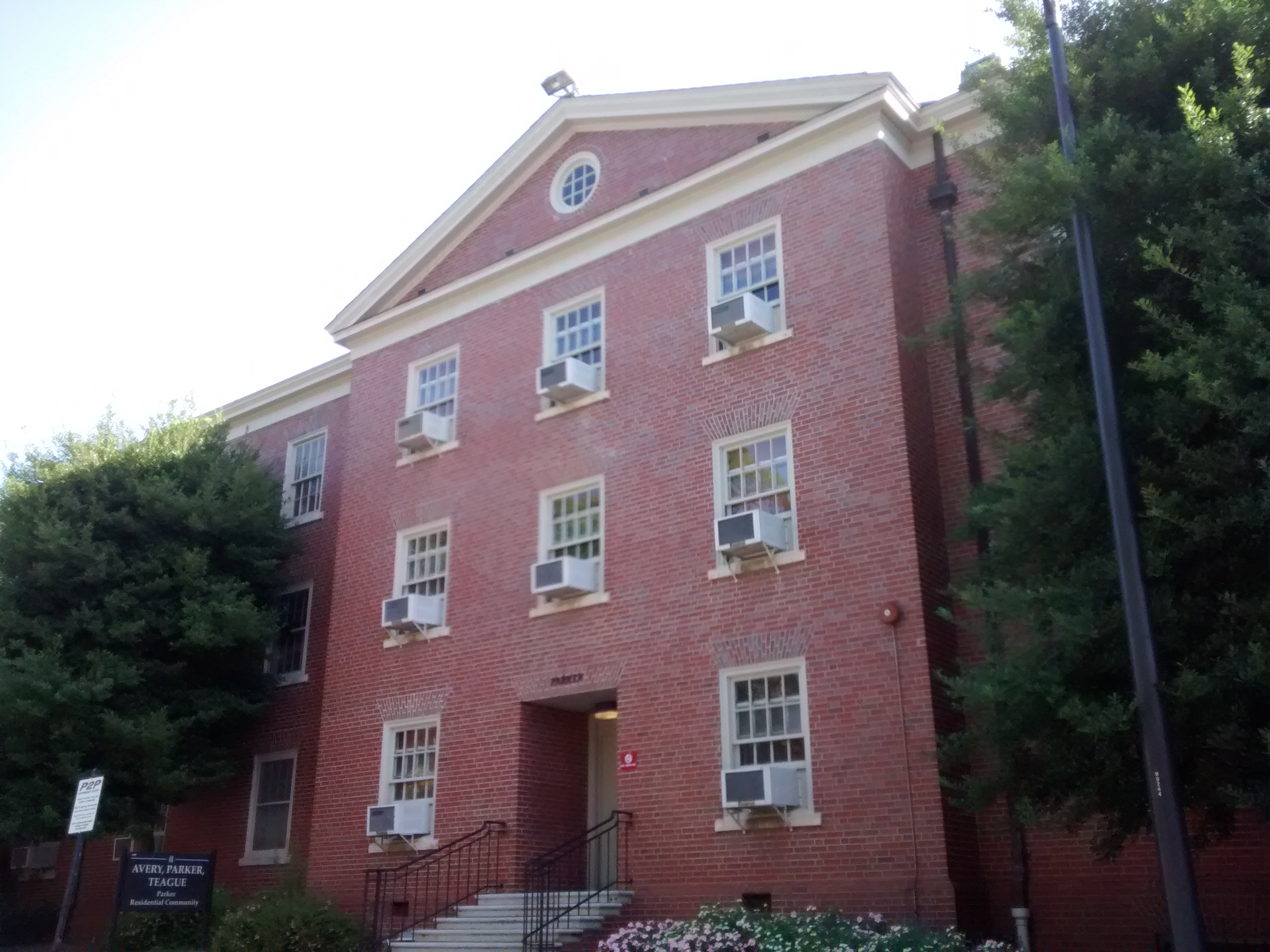
Parker Residence Hall

Parker, located in the same named Parker Community, is a three-story building that was built in 1958. Its three floors hold a total of 167 residents, including three resident advisors. The residents have access to study rooms, kitchens, ice machines, a laundry room, a TV room, lounges and vending machines.

It is named after John J. Parker who graduated from the University of North Carolina in 1907. He was a successful lawyer and later became a judge on the U.S. Court of Appeals. He attempted to run for governor later in life and was also nominated for the U.S. Supreme Court by President Herbert Hoover. Neither of these, however, were successful endeavours.

Avery

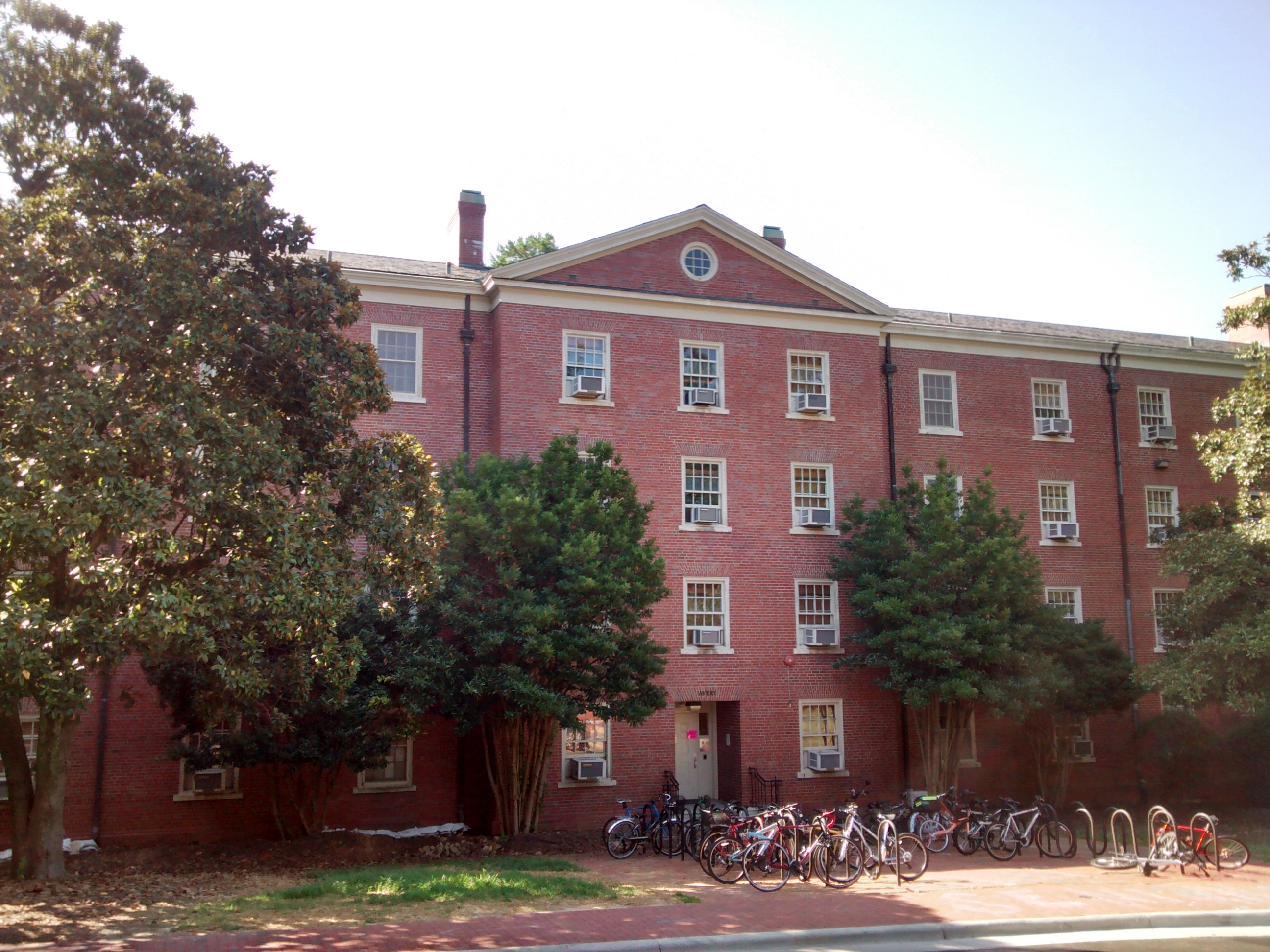
Avery Residence Hall

Avery is a part of the Parker Community. It was built in 1958 and is suite-style with balcony access. The building is four stories tall, and contains 241 male and female residents and four resident advisors. Avery's amenities include study rooms, kitchens, ice machines, a laundry room, a TV room, lounges, a basketball court and vending machines.

Avery bears the name of William Waightstill Avery, the valedictorian of the class of 1837. He was a lawyer and served in the State House of Commons as well as the State Senate. In 1861 he was the Confederate Senator from North Carolina until he was killed in 1864 by a group of Union sympathizers.

Teague

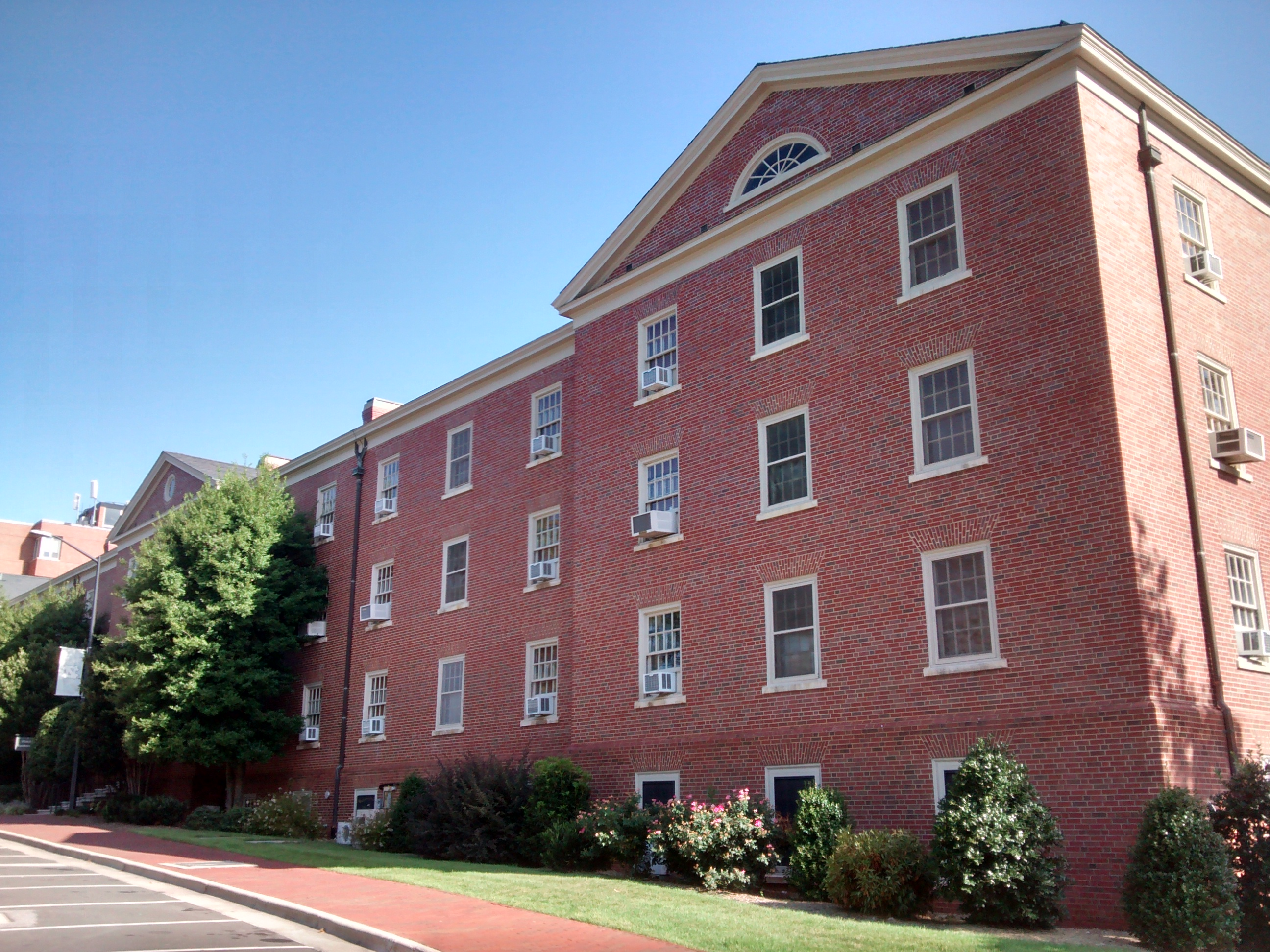
Teague Residence Hall

Teague is the last of the residence halls in the Parker community. It was also built in 1958 and like Parker, is only three stories tall. It houses 171 residents and four resident advisors. The rooms are arranged in a suite-style with balcony access. There are study rooms, kitchens, ice machines, a laundry room, a TV room, lounges, a basketball court, and vending machines for the residents to enjoy. Teague is also where the Chinese Living-Learning Community is. Residents participating in this program are given a chance to develop their lingual skills outside of the classroom as well as immerse themselves in the culture of Spanish-speaking countries. Students will participate in both service and social activities that incorporate the Spanish language and culture.

Teague is named after Claude Edward Teague, the university's longtime business manager. Trained as a lawyer, he received an undergraduate degree from UNC in 1912. He became a high school principal and superintendent before serving in the army during World War I. Upon his return, he became the business manager of the North Carolina College for Women, now called the University of North Carolina at Greensboro. He moved to the University of North Carolina in 1943 until his retirement in 1957.

== South Campus ==
The southern part of campus contains 8 residence halls in 6 different communities.

=== Craige Community ===
Craige

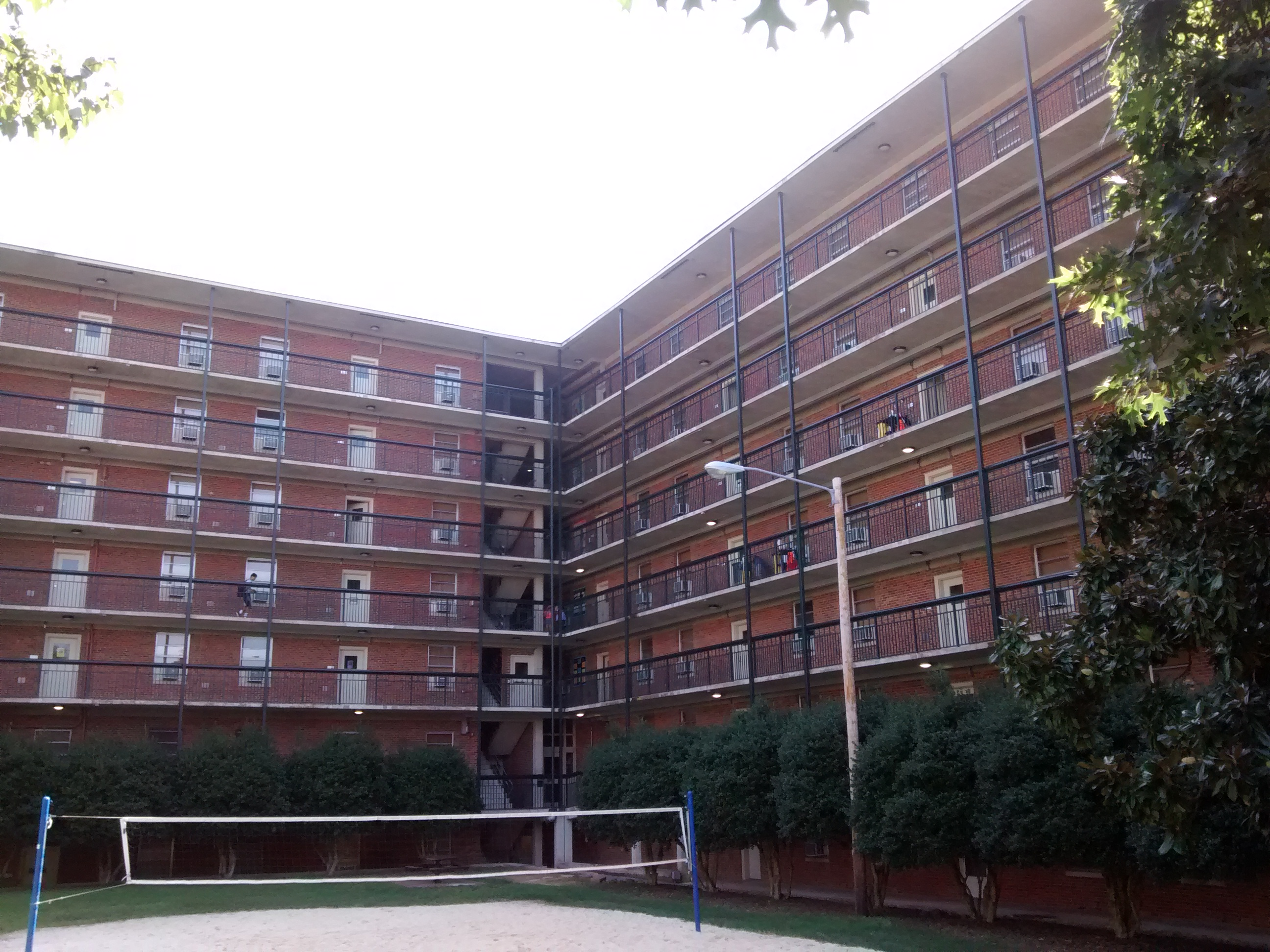
Craige Residence Hall

Craige is a six-story high-rise suite-style residence hall with balcony access that was built in 1962. The total population of the residence hall is 636, coed, including 12 resident advisors. Due to its size, it is the only building in its community. It has study rooms and kitchens on the second through sixth floors, ice machines and vending machines as well as a recreation room and a TV room. It is one of the farthest away from campus and is home primarily to first-year students.

The building is named after Burton Craige who was a lawyer and a politician in North Carolina. He graduated from UNC at the head of his class in 1897. When he graduated he became an attorney for Reynolds Tobacco Company and director of Wachovia Bank & Trust. He served in the state's General Assembly, on the state constitutional study commission and on the university's board of trustees.

=== Ehringhaus Community ===
Ehringhaus

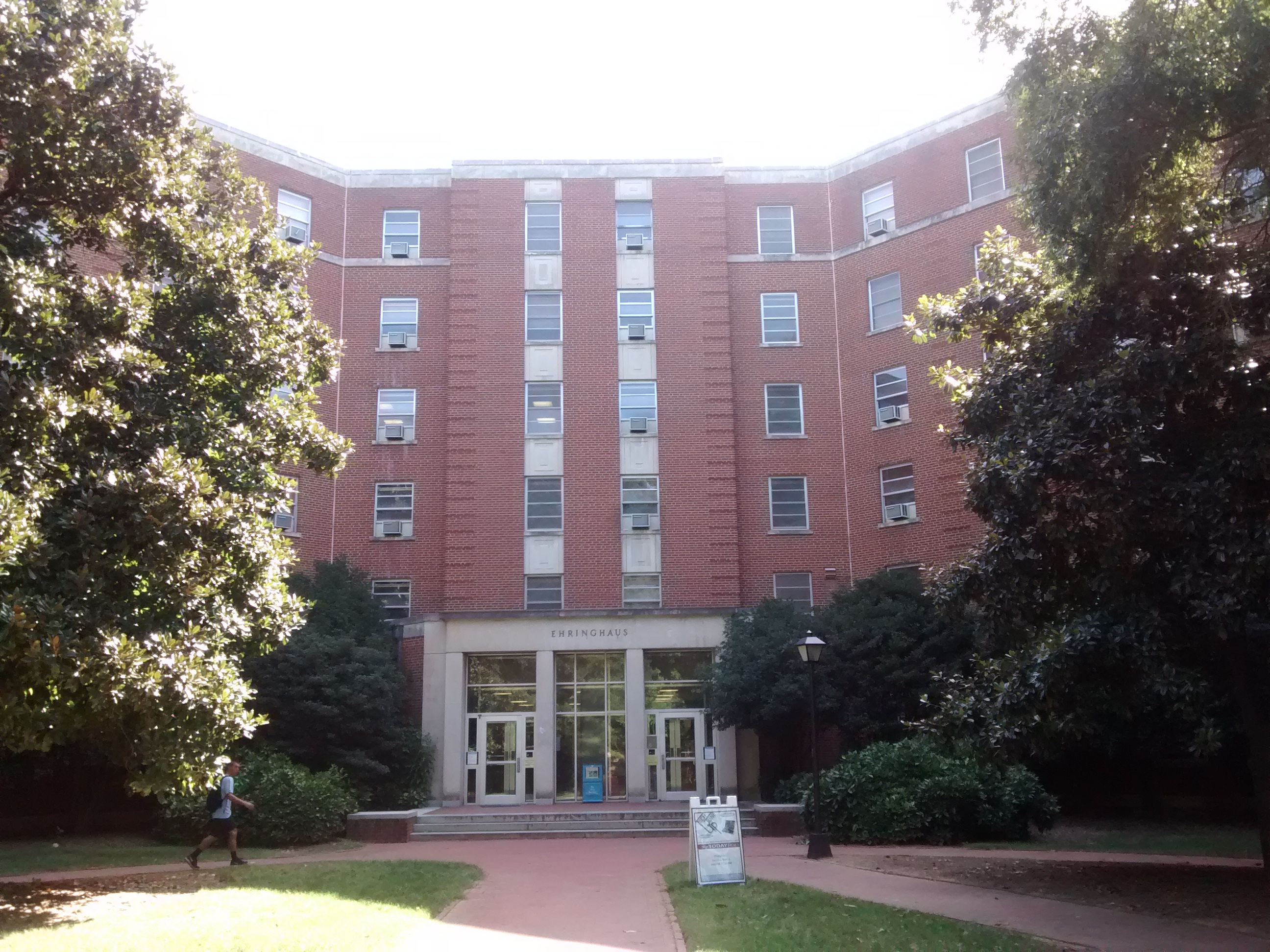
Ehringhaus Residence Hall

Ehringhaus, like Craige, was built in 1962 and is six stories in height and is the only building in its community. Its population is 640 students with thirteen resident advisors. This coed residence hall includes study rooms, kitchens, ice machines, a laundry room, a TV room, lounges, a recreation room and vending machines that are accessible by the residents. The hall is suite-style with outdoor corridor and balcony access. The second floor of Ehringhaus is home to the Service and Leadership Living-Learning Community. The Community is paired with the APPLES Service-Learning program and is designed for students who wish to be active in their community and take part in public service.

Named for former Governor John Christoph Blucher Ehringhaus. He graduated from UNC in 1902 and received a degree in law in 1903. As a state legislator, he supported the expansion of the state's high schools. However, when he was elected to governor in 1932 he was forced to cut state employee salaries due to the Depression as well as reduce the budget of state agencies. He went back to being a lawyer in Raleigh after one term as governor.

=== Hinton James Community ===
Hinton James

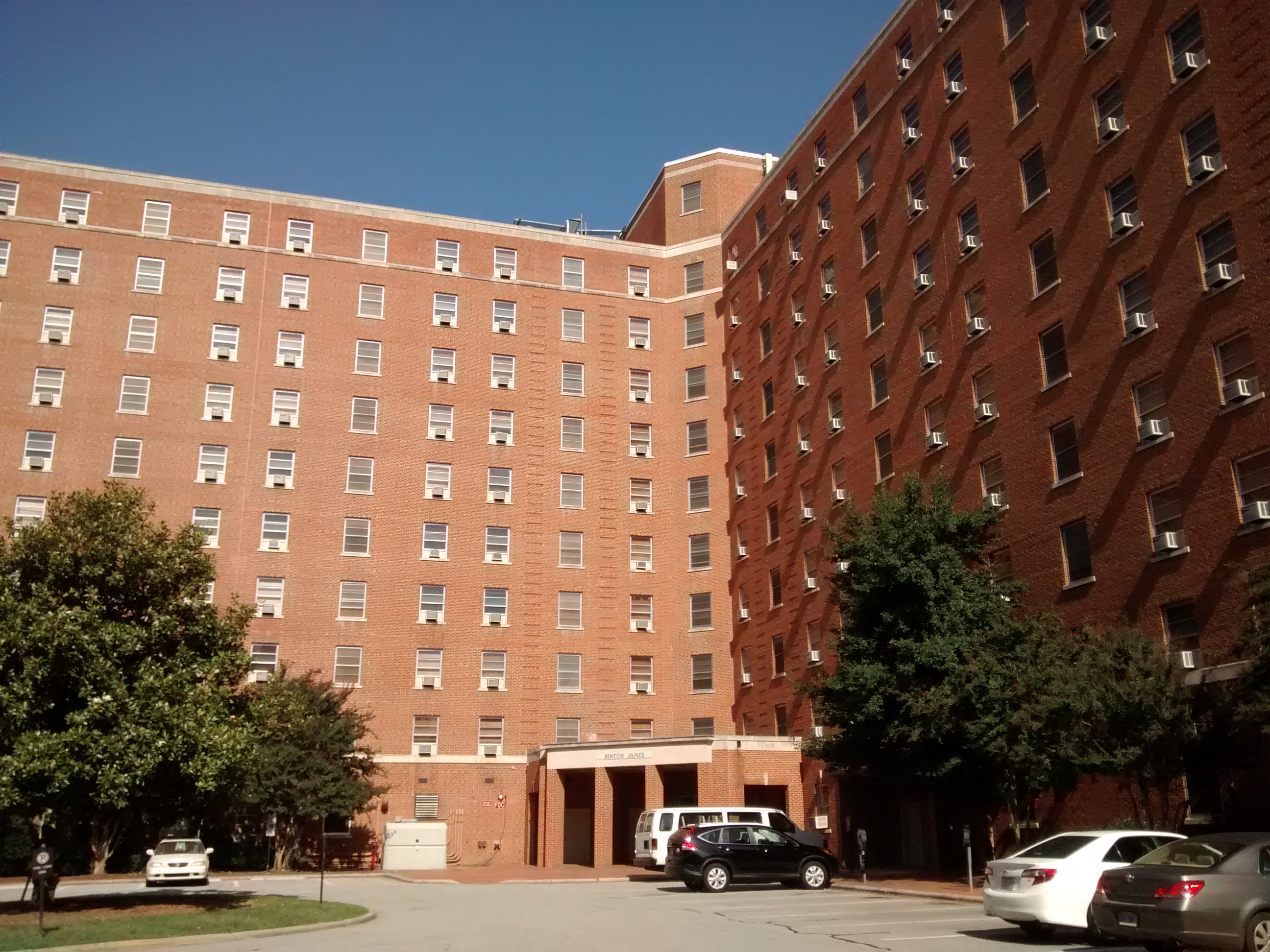
Hinton James Residence Hall

Hinton James Residence Hall, the only building in the Hinton James Community is another of the ten-story high-rise residence halls and was built in 1967. It is suite style with balcony access and has a population of about 950 residents with 27 resident advisors. The building is coed and contains study rooms, kitchens, ice machines, laundry rooms, a TV room, lounges, a recreation room, a basketball court, and vending machines. The residents are primarily first-years, as the hall is located the furthest from North Campus.

This residence hall is named for the first student to arrive on campus when it opened in 1795, Hinton James. James was born near Wilmington, North Carolina, from where he walked to The University of North Carolina at Chapel Hill to attend, and was one of the first members of the Philanthropic Society. He graduated with his degree in 1798 as a member of the university's first graduating class. After college he became an engineer and was elected to the state legislature for three terms, starting in 1807.

=== Manning East Community ===
Koury

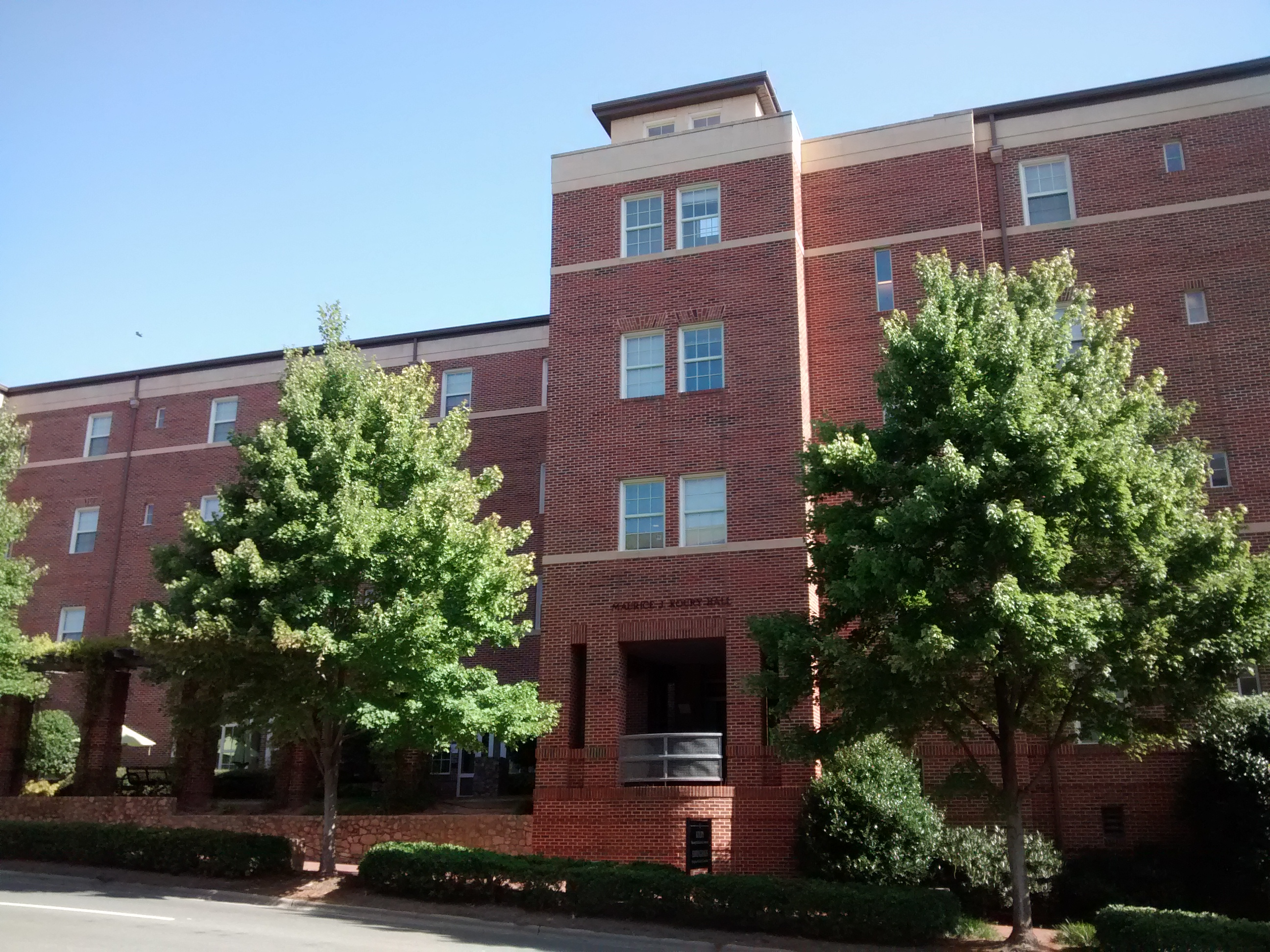
Koury Residence Hall

Koury Hall is part of the Manning East Community, located off of Manning Drive and placed near Ehringhaus. It is suite style with interior corridor access and was built in 2002. The coed population consists of 263 residents, including the seven Resident Advisers. Amenities include seminar rooms, study rooms, kitchens, ice machines, a laundry room, a TV room, lounges, a recreation room and vending machines. Koury is also home to The Carolina Experience Living-Learning Community. This program is targeted at first-year students and is designed to help students adapt to the college environment, make plenty of connections across campus and find a way to make college a significant and enjoyable experience.

Koury is named in honour of Maurice J Koury, who graduated from UNC in 1949 with a Bachelor of Arts degree in chemistry. He went on to become president of Carolina Hosiery Mills and maintained intimate ties with the university, sometimes serving on the Board of Trustees, the Board of Visitors, the Medical Foundation of North Carolina, Inc., the General Alumni Association's board and the Morehead Scholarship Committee. He led a successful fund-raising drive in the early 1980s as the president of the Educational Foundation to finance the construction of the Dean E. Smith Center and the adjacent natatorium, which is also named for Koury.

Horton

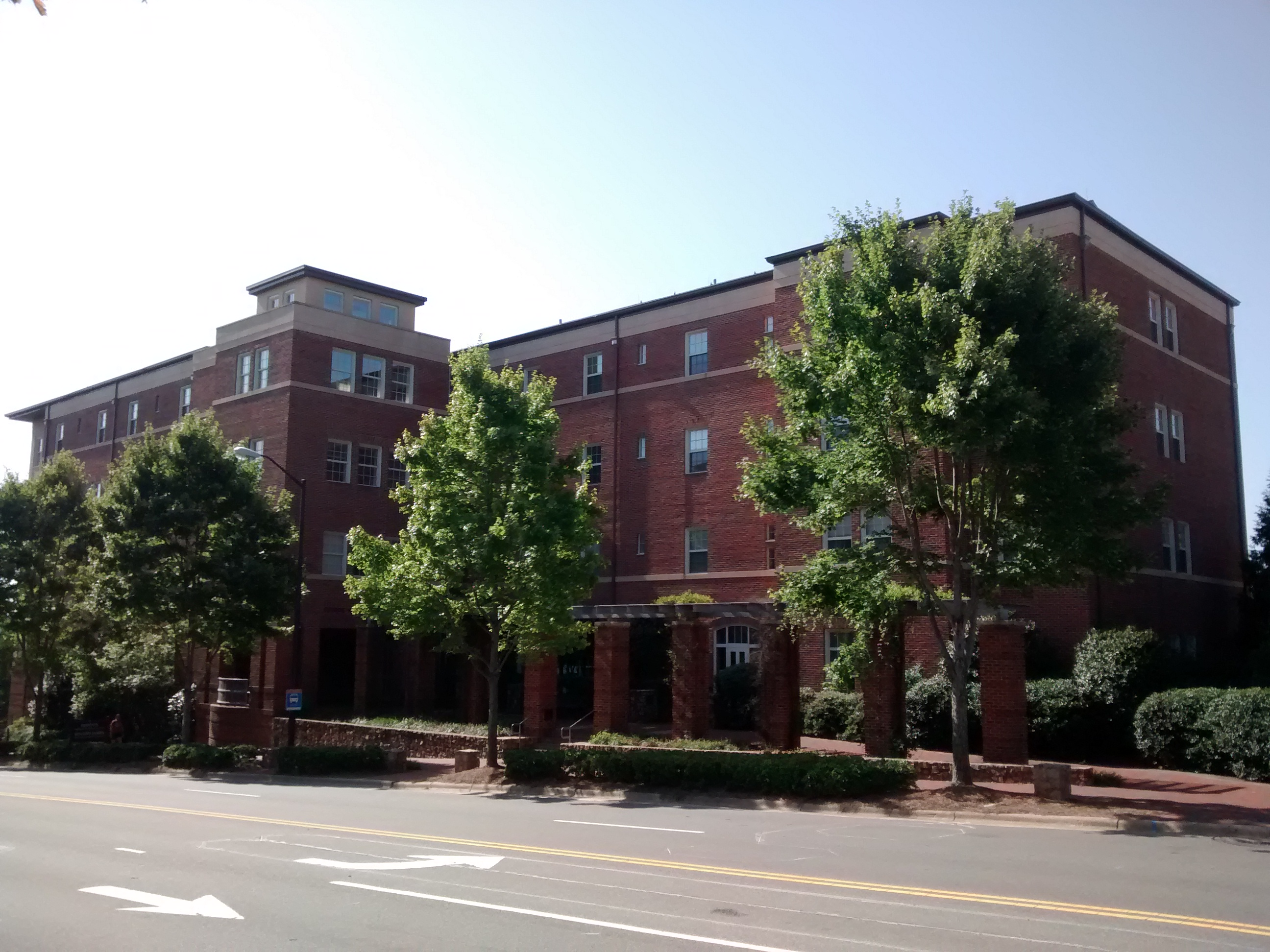
Horton Residence Hall

Horton is one of the newest residence halls on campus, built in 2002. The building's four floors house 276 students, both men and women with eight Resident Advisers. Horton is in a suite-style layout with interior corridor access. The building also has seminar rooms, study rooms, kitchens, ice machines, laundry rooms, a TV room, a recreation room and vending machines that all residents have access to.

Named after George Moses Horton, who was a slave in Chatham County who taught himself how to read and write. His master eventually permitted Horton to rent his own time and Horton made money by writing poems for university students who wanted to impress their lady friends. Horton hoped to eventually make enough money to buy his freedom but, unfortunately, he never acquired the sum. He published three books of his poetry before 1865, the most notable being The Hope of Liberty, appearing in 1829 as the first book ever published by an African American in the South. Horton Hall is the first building in Carolina named in honour of a slave and is believed to be the first university building in the nation to bear the name of a slave.

=== Manning West Community ===
Hardin

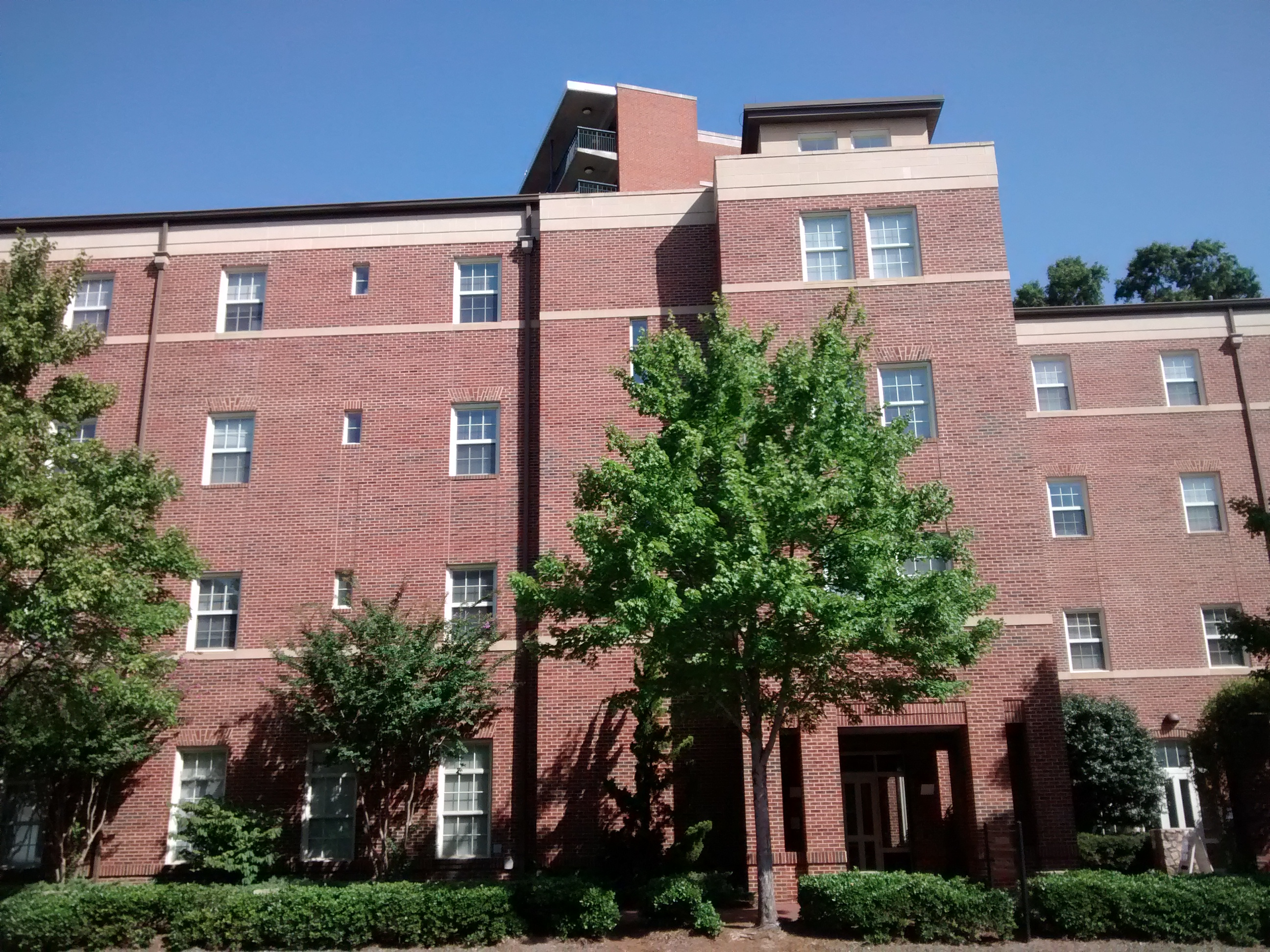
Hardin Residence Hall

Hardin Hall is very similar to Craige North. It was built in 2002 and is on the opposite side of Manning Drive and is located near Morrison. It is four floors but has fewer residents than Craige North at 190 men and women, including its six resident advisors. Hardin is suite style with interior corridor access. Like most other residence halls in the southern part of campus, Hardin has study rooms, kitchens, ice machines, a laundry room, a TV room, lounges, a recreation room and vending machines for its residence, but also has seminar rooms that are unique to the Manning East and West Communities. The residents are primarily sophomores and the hall is home to the Sophomore Year Navigating Carolina (SYNC) Living-Learning Community. The program focuses on the development of sophomore students in the areas of academic enrichment, career exploration and leadership development by partnering with four university resources: the Office of Undergraduate Education, the Career Center, Housing and Residential Education and Carolina Leadership Development.

This building is named after Paul Hardin, UNC's chancellor from 1988 to 1995. Hardin graduated from Duke University in 1952 at the top of his law school class. After college, he served in the U.S. Army's counterintelligence unit, before leaving the military to work as a lawyer. He eventually taught at Duke Law School and then moved on to become the president at Wofford College, Southern Methodist University and then Drew University before entering the position of chancellor at UNC in 1988.

Craige North

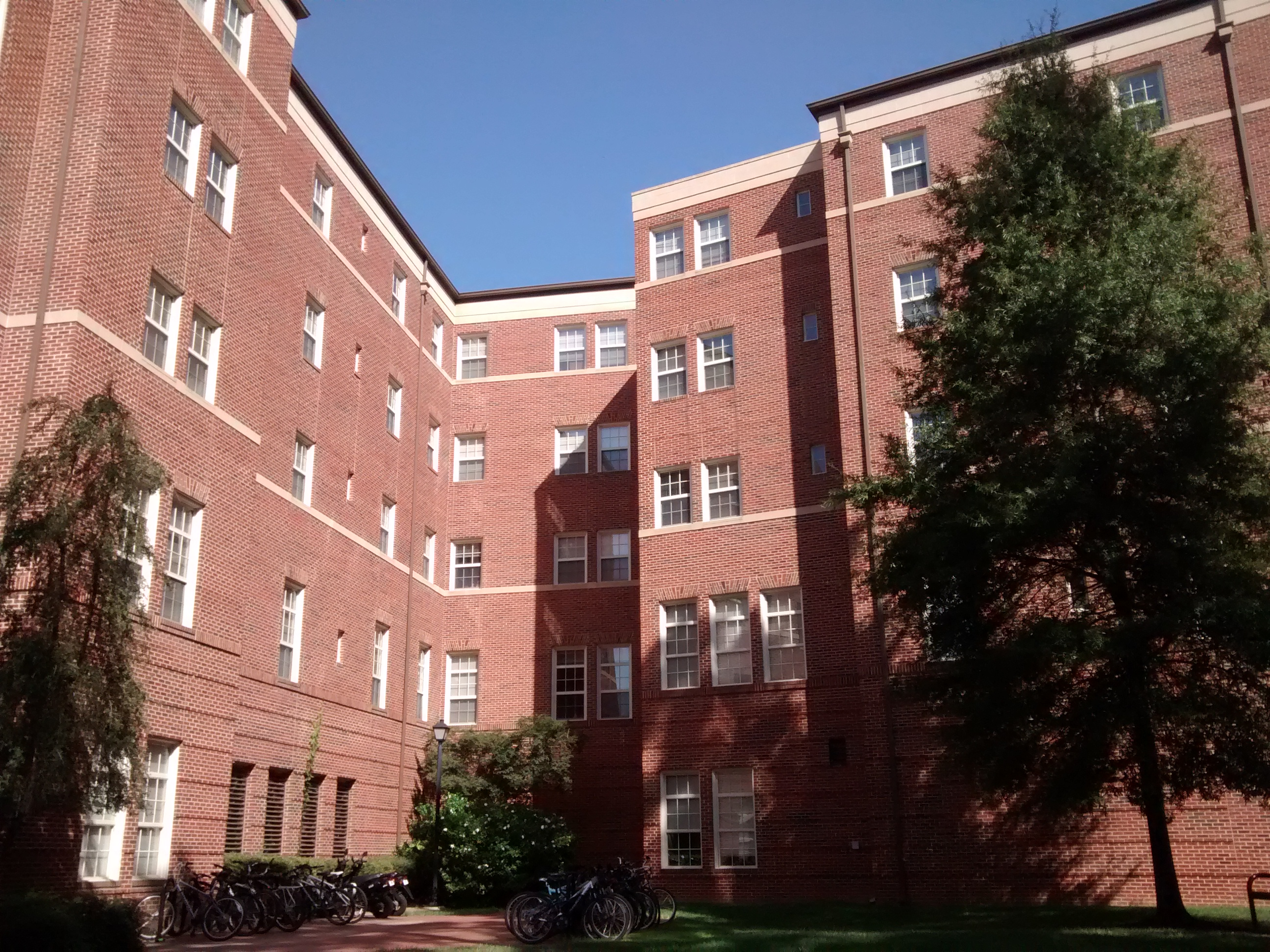
Craige North Residence Hall

Craige North is located next to Craige on Manning Drive and is part of the Manning West Community. The building itself was built in 2002 and is four stories with a population of 231 residents, including the seven resident advisors. It is a coed residence hall that is suite-style with interior corridor access. Craige North boasts seminar rooms, study rooms, kitchens, ice machines, a laundry room, a TV room, lounges, a recreation room and vending machines for its residents' pleasure. Craige North is also home to the Spanish Living-Learning Community. Residents participating in this program are given a chance to develop their lingual skills outside of the classroom as well as immerse themselves in the culture of Spanish-speaking countries. Students will participate in both service and social activities that incorporate the Spanish language and culture.

Also named for Burton Craige. (See Craige Community)

=== Morrison Community ===
Morrison

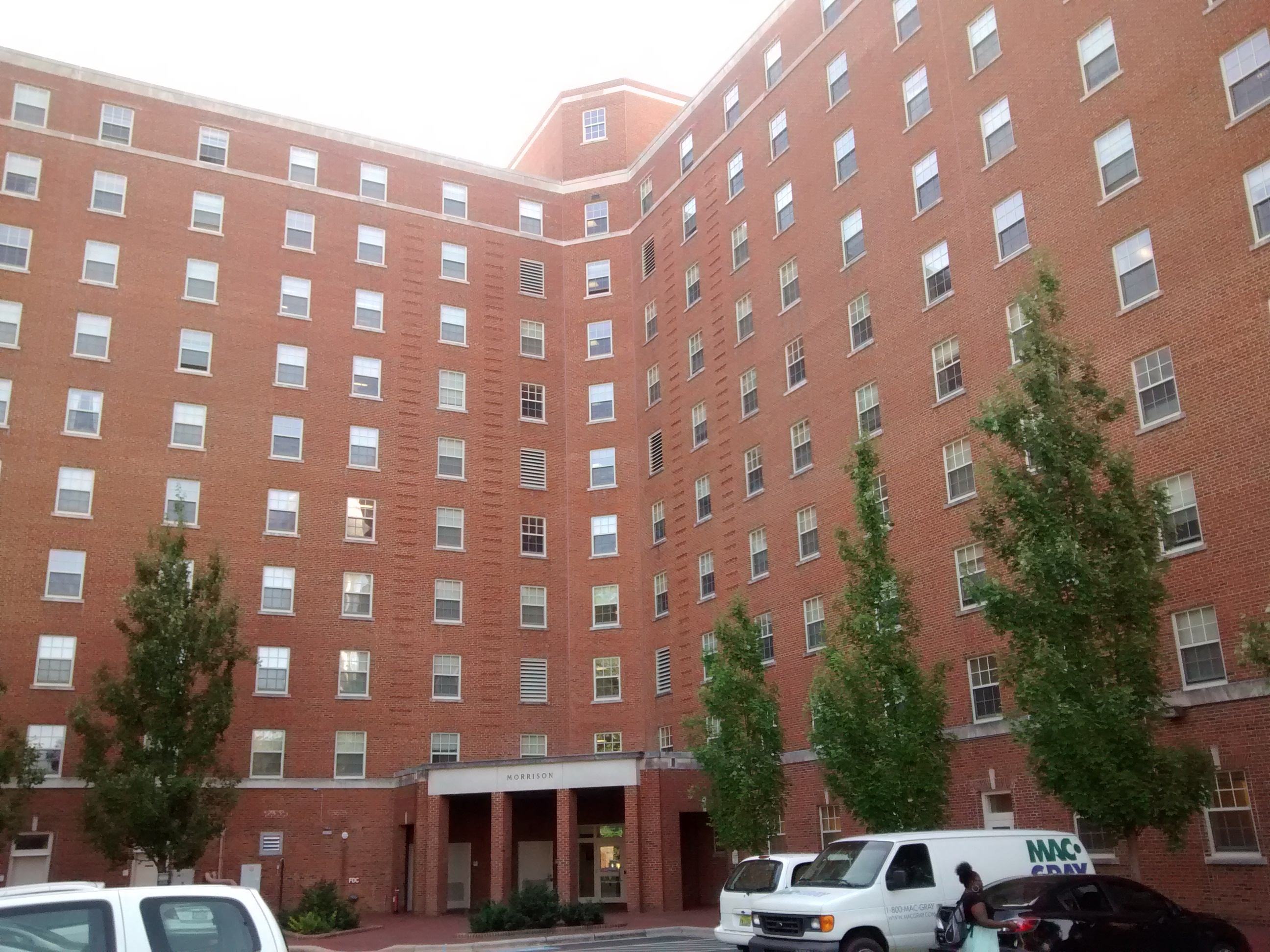
Morrison Residence Hall

Morrison Hall was built in 1965 but was renovated in the summer of 2006. It is the most modern of the high-rise residence halls featuring a main lobby lounge with pub chairs and internet connectivity, a recreation room with billiards tables, ping pong tables and a widescreen TV, kitchens, ice machines, lounges and smaller study rooms for groups, vending machines, a lighted basketball court, picnic tables and charcoal grills and a laundry room. Morrison is also host to a Package Center as well as the Sustainability Living-Learning Community. As a part of the program, Morrison has solar panels for heating and air and a compost pile outside. The program is designed to raise awareness of sustainable living methods in all areas of life.

Named after Cameron Morrison, a North Carolina governor, U.S. senator and congressman. While Morrison never graduated from college, he was an energetic supporter of higher education and an influential trustee. To repay the hard work he put forth for UNC, the university made him an honorary member of the class of 1898 and gave him an honorary degree in 1922. He was a Charlotte lawyer who began his political career supporting Governor Charles B. Aycock and the white supremacy campaign of 1898. He became governor himself in 1920 and was a key supporter of UNC's expansion program. Morrison, in a turnabout, began to oppose lynching in the 1920s and claimed to have ended it in North Carolina during his term as governor. He eventually went on to help organize the North Carolina Commission on Interracial Cooperation.

== Granville Towers ==
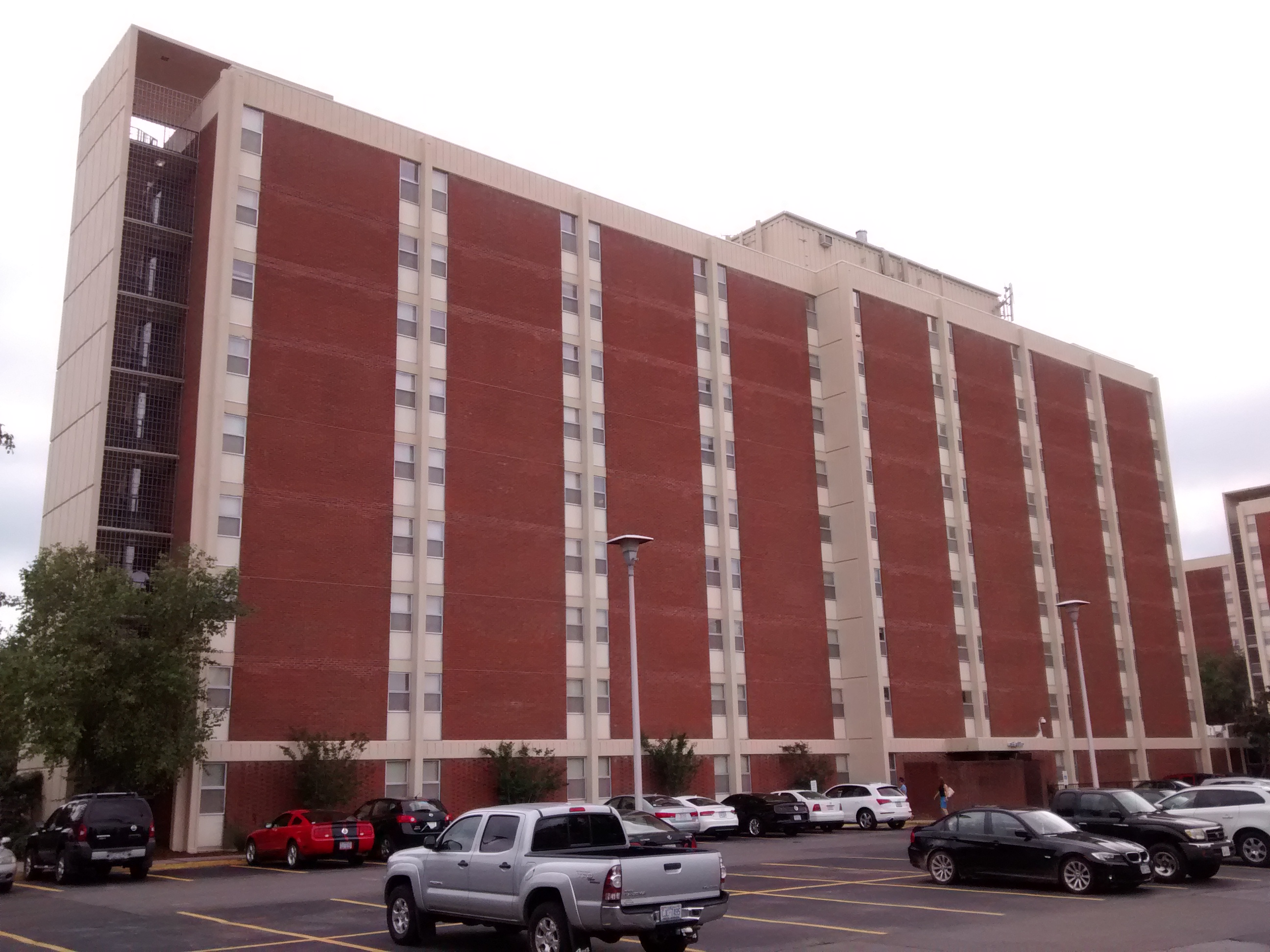
East Tower

Granville Towers is a student housing facility serving the students of the University of North Carolina at Chapel Hill. It is not owned by the university, but first-year students, who are required to live in student housing, may live there. Granville Towers has been up and running for over 40 years and offers UNC students a complete housing and dining package. It is located right off of Franklin Street.

Granville Towers consists of three separate towers: South, West, and East. Residents of Granville share a fully furnished, air-conditioned, and hardwood floor suite. Bathrooms are shared between two rooms and include a full shower and toilet. Until 2024, residents historically received housekeeping once a week from an outside vendor. It's basketball court and a swimming pool were removed in 2015. Each of the towers include laundry rooms, drink machines, and amenity spaces in it's basement.

=== South Tower ===
The South Tower Basement's special amenity is the large study lounge for all Granville residents. It has individual desks as well as large tables for each resident's studying needs. South Tower is also where the main information desk and the Management Offices are located for Granville Towers.

=== West Tower ===
The West Tower Basement's special amenity is its cardio-workout room. The cardio workout room contains treadmills, elliptical machines, stationary bicycles, and television workout programs. West Tower is also conveniently connected to the Agora, Granville Tower's private dining facility.

=== East Tower ===
The East Tower basement has two main amenities. The majority of the basement consists of a game room with ping pong, billiards, foosball, and air hockey. This room also doubles as comfortable place to watch TV on the basement's flat screen with friends. Also, in East tower basement there is an interactive group-study room. An entire wall of this room is covered in whiteboard material for use in group studying.

=== Agora ===
The Agora is the private dining facility of the residents of Granville Towers. Unlike other campus housing, Granville Towers has its own facilities for the residents to eat. Meal plans are included with all rent packages at Granville. When choosing a meal plan you have a couple of options: Unlimited, 14 meals per week, 8 meals per week, 200 a semester, or 120 a semester. The Agora is a buffet-style dining system.

Although the Agora is only open until 7:30 P.M., there is another option for residents who like to eat a little later. A service called "late night" takes place in the Agora between 8:30 P.M. and 11:00 P.M. During this time, residents are able to order food in a fast-food-type process.

== Apartment communities ==
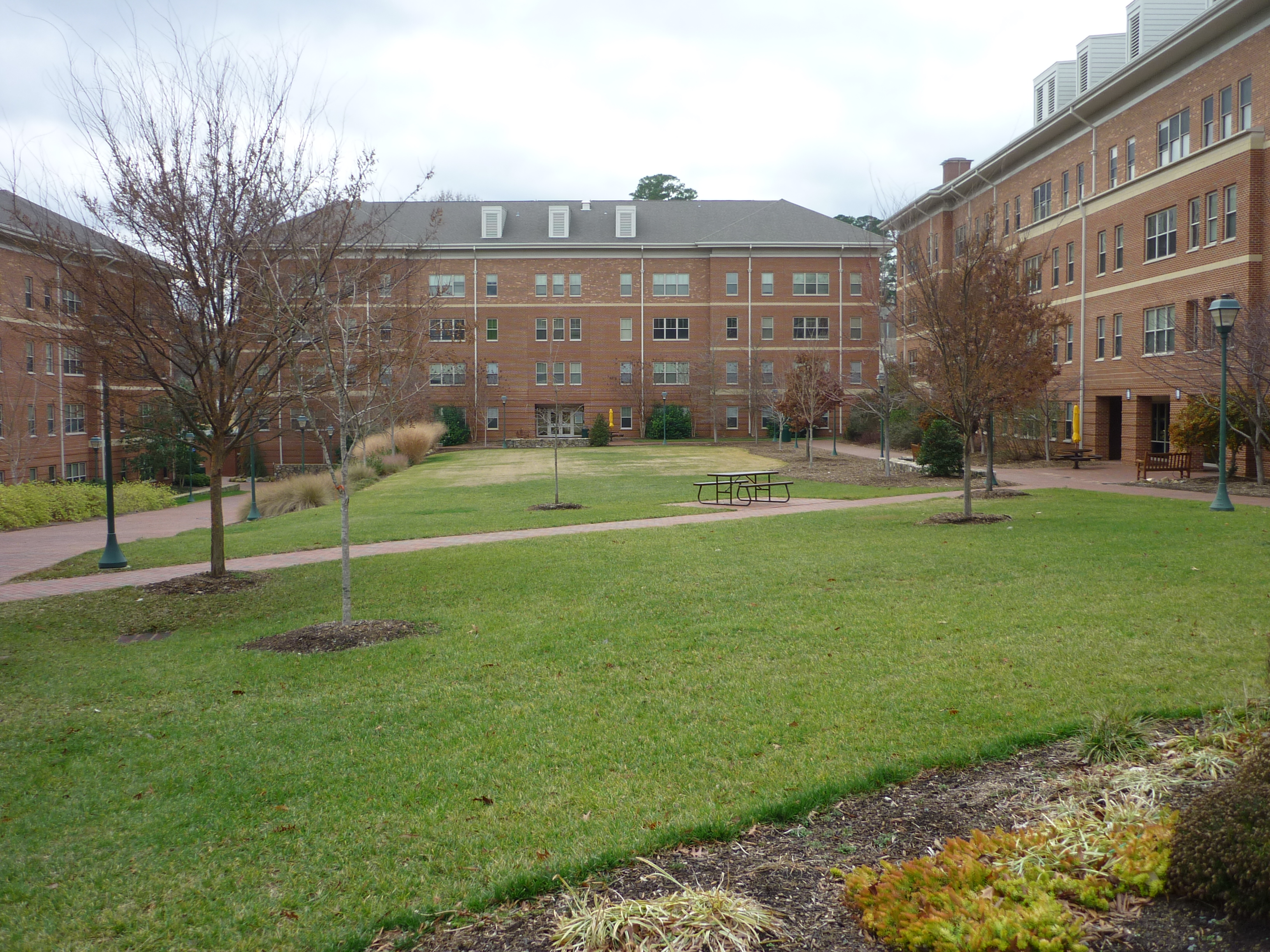
Ram Village

=== Ram Village ===
Ram Village, located in the southern part of campus, offers apartment-style housing for undergraduate students (mostly juniors and seniors). It was built in 2006 and is home to more than 900 UNC students. Ram Village offers 1, 2, 3, and 4-bedroom apartments. Some amenities include study rooms, lounges, a kitchen, laundry, a recreation room, and vending machines.

The community is made up of five buildings, all of which are coed.

=== Odum Village ===
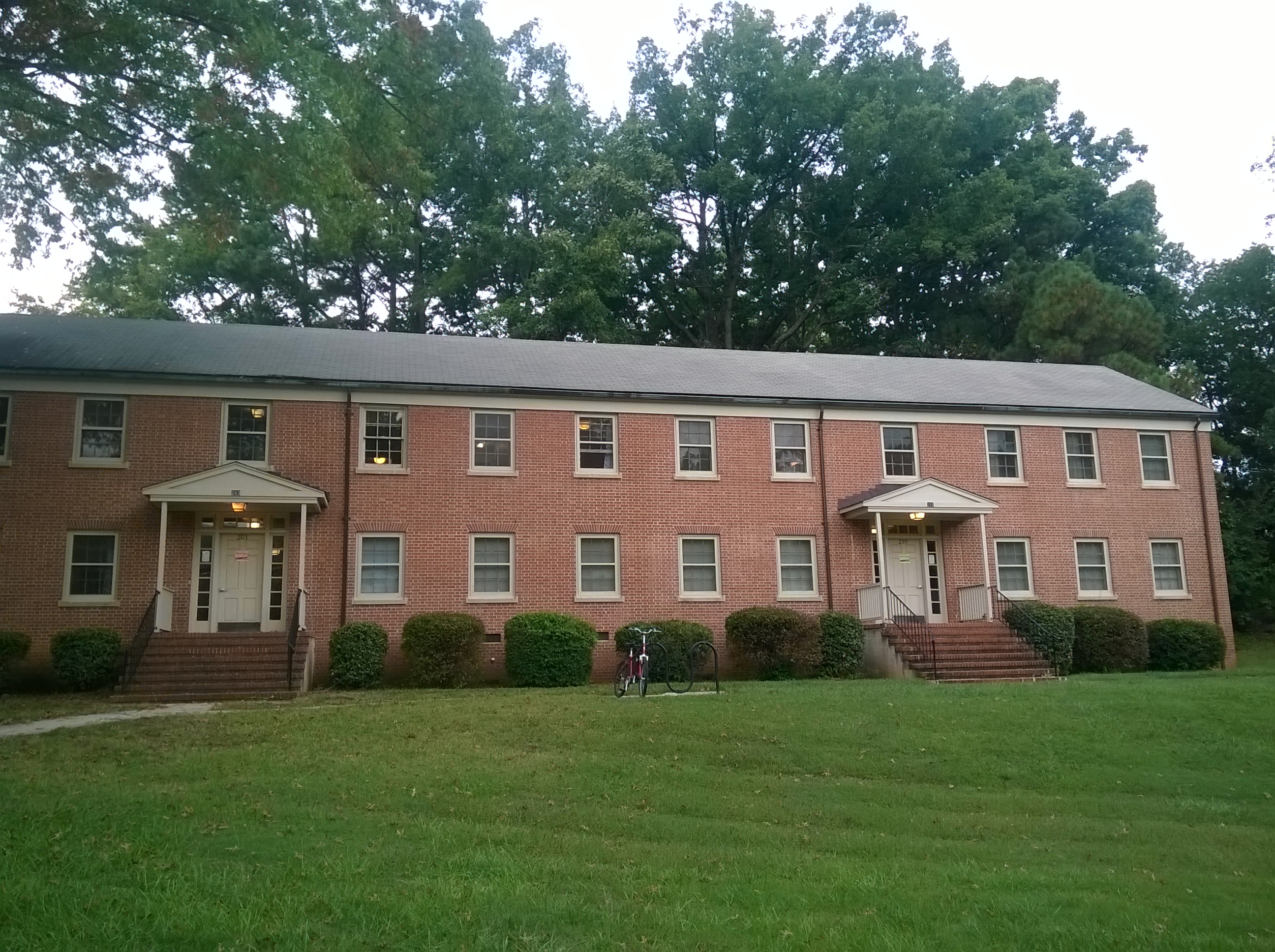
Odum Village

Odum Village, located in the southern part of campus, was built in 1963 and offered one and two-bedroom furnished apartments for graduate and undergraduate upperclassmen. All units came with a kitchen, bathroom, living room and dining area. Amenities included volleyball courts, picnic areas with charcoal grills, and on-site laundry facilities. Odum Village was coed. Odum Village has been officially closed in May 2016. Odum Village is expected to be demolished.

=== Baity Hill ===
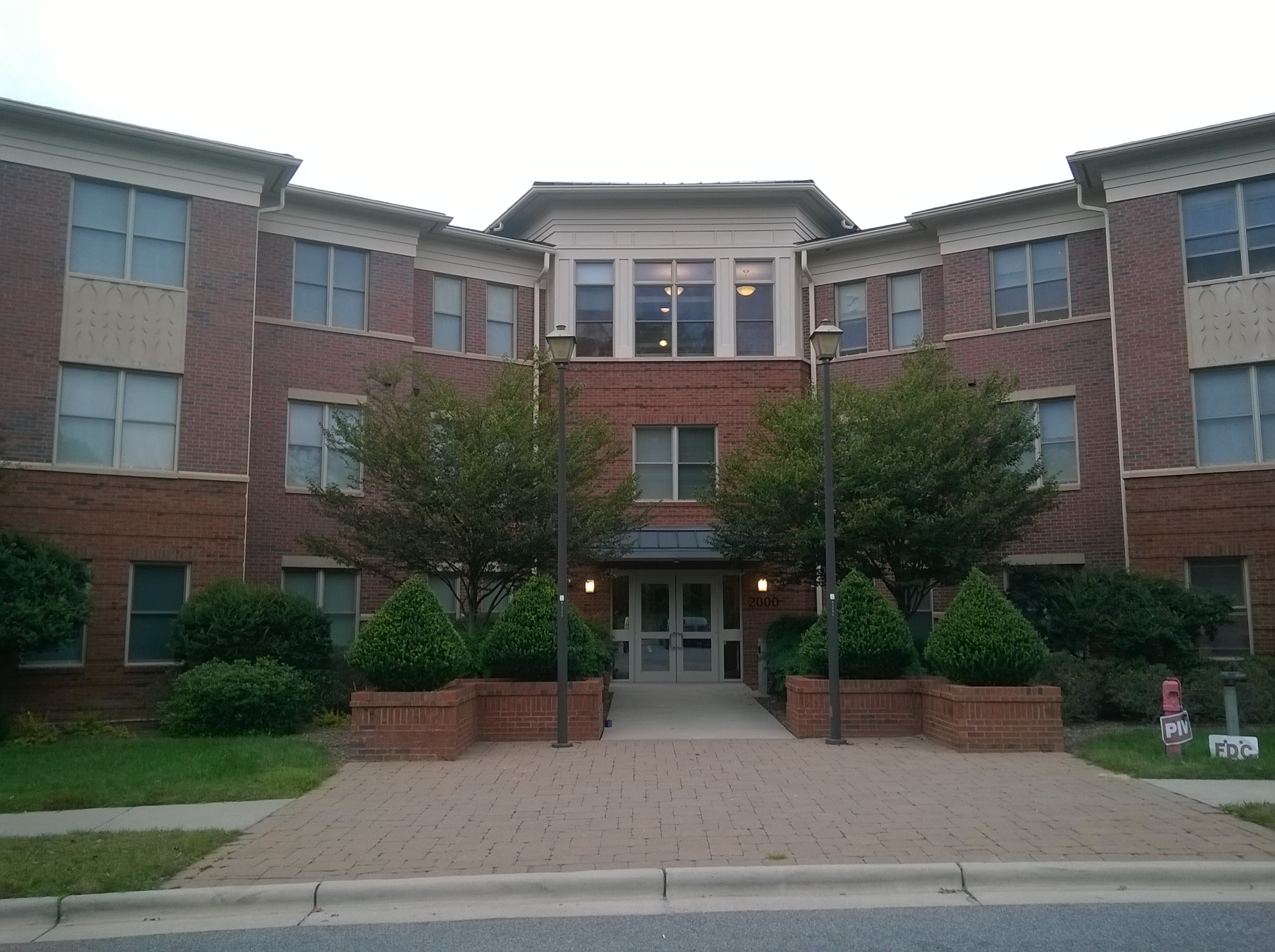
Baity Hill

Baity Hill Apartments offer apartment-style housing for UNC's married students and students with children. This is a more upscale community geared toward families and some amenities include spacious rooms and living areas, an enclosed playground, walking paths, and beautiful views of the UNC campus.

== Greek Housing ==
Of the 54 Greek organizations at UNC, including both fraternities and sororities, 28 of them have their own house. Depending on the chapter, members are either required to live in the house for a minimum number of years or they are given the option to live wherever they choose, be it in the house or elsewhere. The typical fraternity or sorority household is anywhere from 20 to as many as 80 people in some instances. In order to live in the house, members typically pay higher dues than those living elsewhere. Rooms are generally upstairs and are either doubles or singles depending on how crowded the house is. Many houses have meal plans and house cooks or house moms that prepare food for the residents. House moms also take care of day-to-day house affairs.

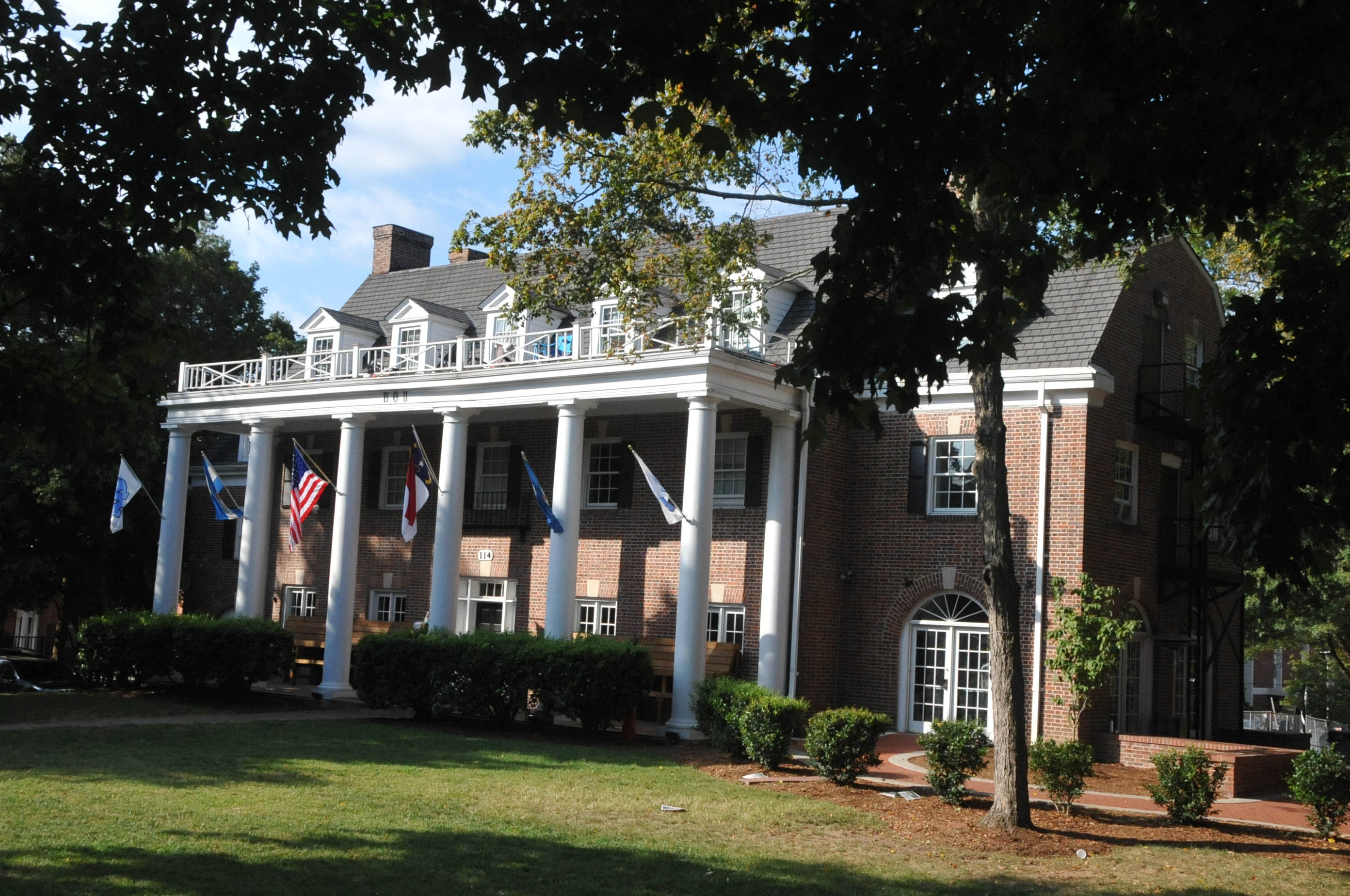
Beta Theta Pi Fraternity House, listed on the National Register of Historic Places in Orange County, North Carolina

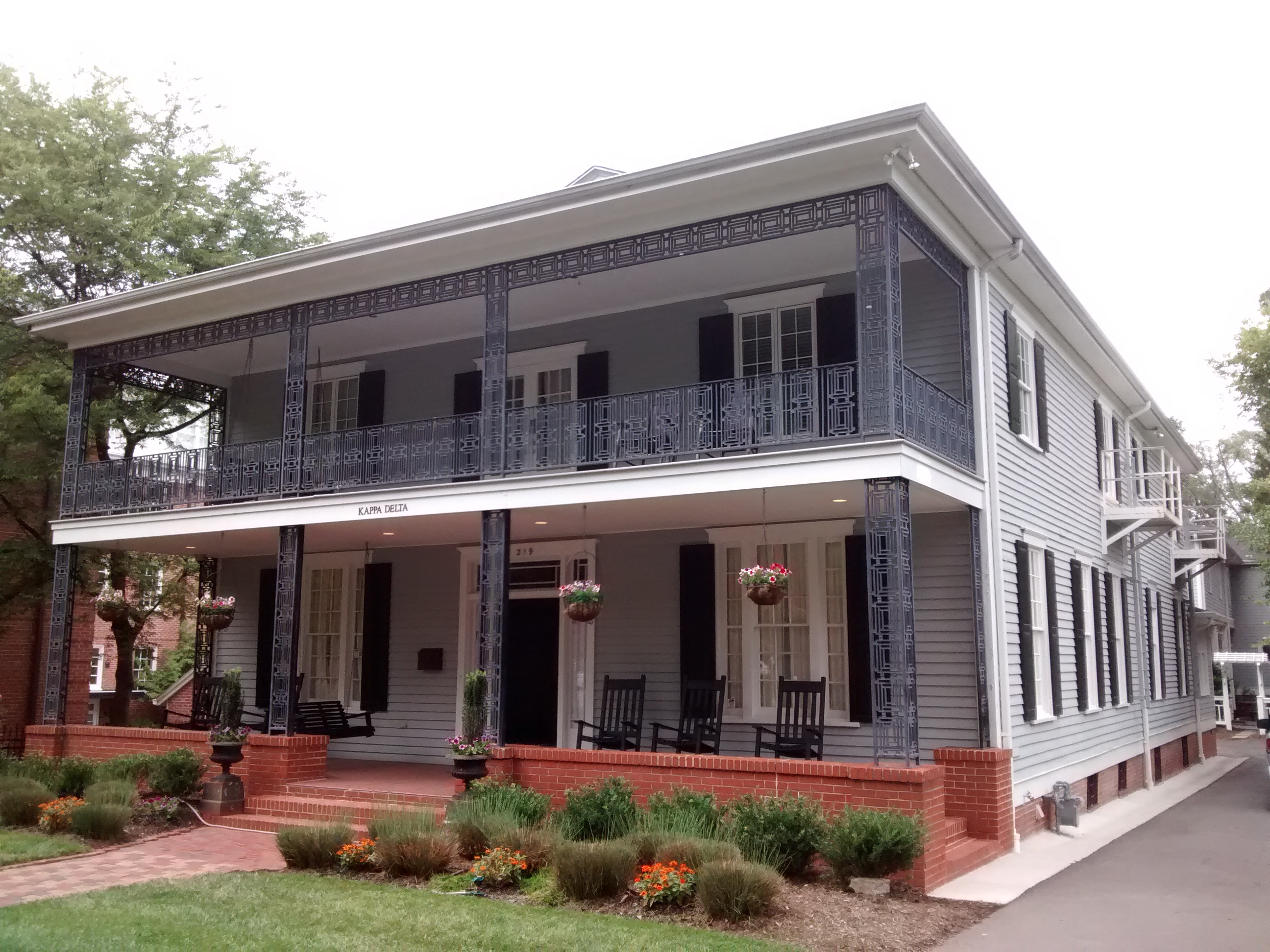
Kappa Delta

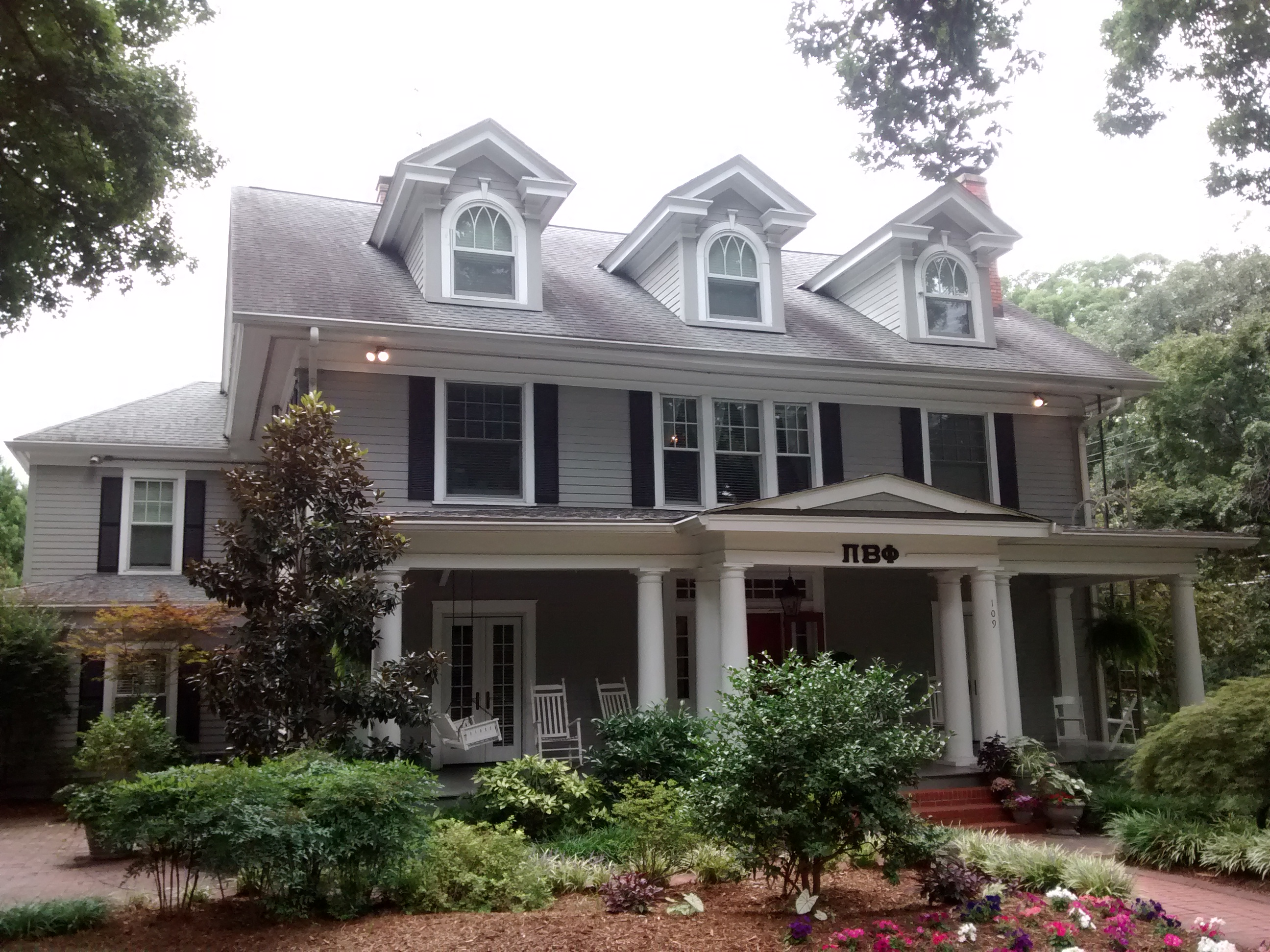
Pi Beta Phi

Below is a list of the Greek organizations at UNC that have a residential house.

- Alpha Chi Omega – 202 Spring Lane, Chapel Hill, NC
- Alpha Delta Pi – 411 East Rosemary Street, Chapel Hill, NC
- Alpha Epsilon Pi – 107 Fraternity Court, Chapel Hill, NC
- Alpha Kappa Alpha
- Beta Theta Pi – 114 South Columbia Street, Chapel Hill, NC
- Chi Phi – 300 South Columbia Street, Chapel Hill, NC
- Chi Psi – 321 West Cameron Avenue, Chapel Hill, NC
- Chi Omega – 313 East Franklin Street, Chapel Hill, NC
- Delta Delta Delta – 407 East Franklin Street, Chapel Hill, NC
- Delta Kappa Epsilon – 132 South Columbia Street, Chapel Hill, NC
- Delta Upsilon
- Kappa Delta – 219 East Franklin Street, Chapel Hill, NC
- Kappa Kappa Gamma – 302 Pittsboro Street, Chapel Hill, NC
- Kappa Sigma – 204 West Cameron Avenue, Chapel Hill, NC
- Lambda Chi Alpha – 229 East Franklin Street, Chapel Hill, NC
- Phi Beta Chi – 420 Hillsborough Street, Chapel Hill, NC
- Phi Delta Theta – 304 South Columbia Street, Chapel Hill, NC
- Phi Gamma Delta – 108 West Cameron Avenue, Chapel Hill, NC
- Phi Mu – 211 Henderson Street, Chapel Hill, NC
- Pi Beta Phi – 109 Hillsborough Street, Chapel Hill, NC
- Pi Kappa Alpha – 106 Fraternity Court, Chapel Hill, NC
- Pi Kappa Phi – 216 East Rosemary Street, Chapel Hill, NC
- Pi Lambda Phi – 110 West Cameron Avenue, Chapel Hill, NC
- Psi Sigma Phi
- Sigma Alpha Epsilon – 109 Fraternity Court, Chapel Hill, NC
- Sigma Chi – 102 Fraternity Court, Chapel Hill, NC
- Sigma Sigma Sigma – 307 East Franklin Street, Chapel Hill, NC
- Sigma Nu – 109 Fraternity Court, Chapel Hill, NC
- Sigma Phi Epsilon – 207 West Cameron Avenue, Chapel Hill, NC
- St. Anthony Hall
- Zeta Psi
- Zeta Tau Alpha – 120 North Street, Chapel Hill, NC
