= Hark the Sound =

Alma mater of the University of North Carolina

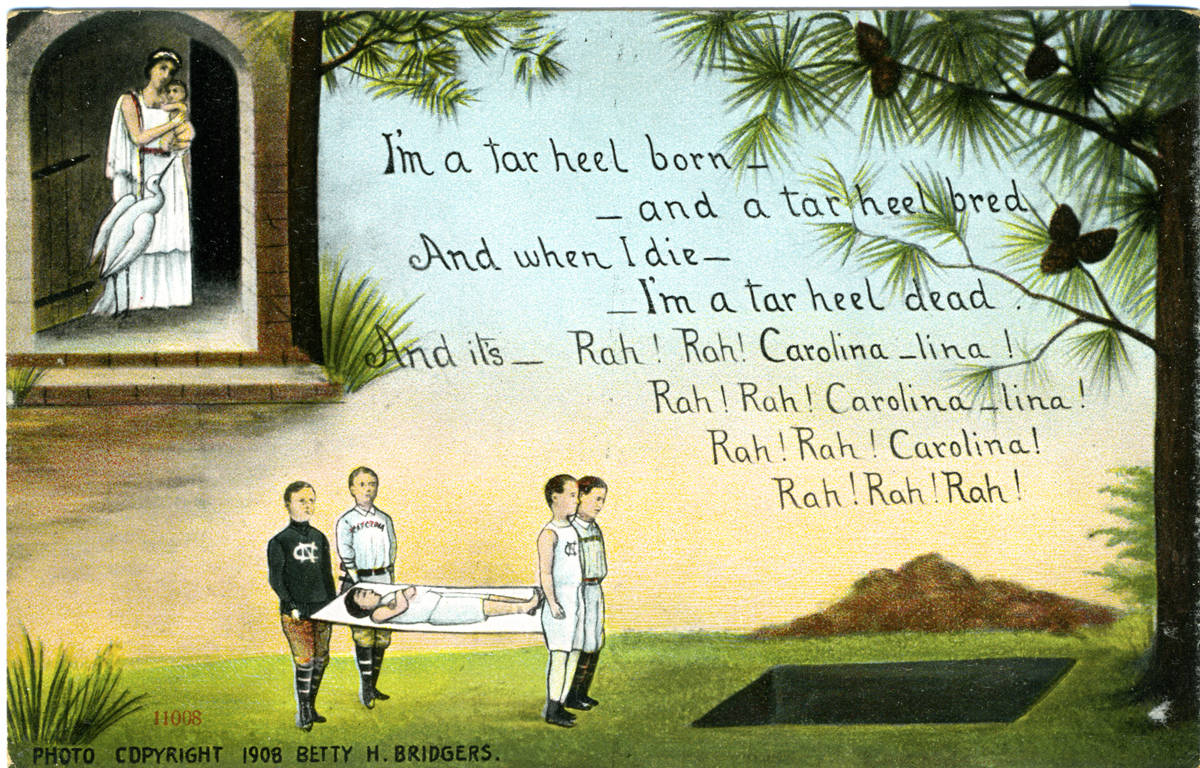
Lyrics from Hark the Sound, UNC-Chapel Hill Alma Mater, ca. 1908.

"Hark the Sound" is the alma mater (song) of the University of North Carolina. It was written by William Starr Myers (class of 1897), a member of the UNC Glee Club at the time. It is sung at the end of athletic events (win or lose) and other university gatherings, and is one of many alma maters set to the music of "Annie Lisle".

It is usually followed by a rendition of Carolina's fight song, "I'm a Tar Heel Born"—even during formal occasions.

Since 2008, an acoustic version of the song has been played before the start of football and basketball games.
Listen to Hark the Sound as played by The Marching Tar Heels,here or as sung by the 1956–57 UNC Glee club, here

== Lyrics ==
The first of the three verses is as follows; it is the only portion sung at University events:

1. Hark the sound of Tar Heel voices
Ringing clear and True
Singing Carolina's praises
Shouting N.C.U.

(chorus)
Hail to the brightest Star of all
Clear its radiance shine
Carolina priceless gem,
Receive all praises thine.

The second and third verses are as follows; they are not typically sung at University events (most likely due to them not being caught on as of now):

2. 'Neath the oaks thy sons and daughters
Homage pay to thee
Time worn walls give back their echo
Hail to U.N.C.

(repeat chorus)

3. Though the storms of life assail us
Still our hearts beat true
Naught can break the friendships formed at
Dear old N.C.U.

(repeat chorus)

N.C.U. is an abbreviation for "North Carolina University," as Carolina was sometimes called in the late 19th century. Since at least the 1980s, it has been common to yell N-C-U! after the line shouting N-C-U. Also, after clear its radiance shine, students will stomp their feet in time with the drum roll—a practice dating back to at least the 1990s.

In recent years, it has become common to shout priceless gem instead of singing it. This practice started among students and younger alumni in the early 2000s.

In 2006, the lyrics of the second verse of Hark the Sound were officially changed. The first line was changed from "sons true hearted" to "sons and daughters."
