= The Marching Tar Heels =

Marching band of the University of North Carolina at Chapel Hill

- School: University of North Carolina at Chapel Hill
- Location: Chapel Hill, NC
- Conference: ACC
- Founded: 1903
- Director: Jeffrey Fuchs
- Assistant Director: Dr. Anna Scott
- Members: approx. 250
- Fight song: "I'm a Tar Heel Born; Here Comes Carolina"
- Website: http://www.uncbands.org

The Marching Tar Heels is the marching band of the University of North Carolina at Chapel Hill. Known as "The Pride of the ACC", the Marching Tar Heels is one of the largest organizations at UNC with over 290 students. The band plays at all home football games as well as travels to away games, usually as a small pep band. However, the entire band travels to one away football game each year, usually staying close to home. These have included trips to universities such as NC State and East Carolina but have also included some longer trips to venues such as Notre Dame in 2006 and the Chick-fil-A Kickoff Game in 2010 and 2016. On August 27, 2022, the band performed with the Marching 100 of Florida A&M University.

The UNC band was formed in 1903 and had their first performance at a UNC baseball game in 1904. The band first started traveling to away athletic events in 1905. The band continues to play for multiple sports including men's and women's soccer, volleyball, men's and women's lacrosse, women's basketball and field hockey. The band also divides into two smaller bands and plays at all men's basketball home games, as well as sending a pep band to tournament games.

The band is currently under the direction of Jeffrey Fuchs.

== Traditions ==
Several traditions have amassed over the years which include:

- The Blue and White Warm-Up Chorale is played before every performance by the Marching Tar Heels. It was written by former band members, Joshua Potter and Ryan Ripperton.
- On football gameday, it has become tradition for the drumline to warm-up (usually in or near The Pit, in the center of campus) before joining the rest of the band for the march to the stadium. The drumline goes through warm-ups, show music, and cadences. It has become a crowd favorite, attracting large crowds at Tar Heel Town.
- Also on football gameday, the trumpets and tubas perform "Carolina Victory" on the steps of Dey Hall one hour and five minutes before kickoff.
- Directly before the march to Kenan Stadium, the band has a "throwdown" about that day's opponent. Seniors re-write the words to the military cadence of "I don't know, but I've been told" and the band recites the verses as a build-up to the drumline cadence.
- The march to the stadium is a parade route that begins in front of Wilson Library, and ends with the march into the stadium. During the march, the drumline plays through their cadences as the rest of the band does choreographed dances to each cadence.
- It has become tradition that the drumline finish each rehearsal with a final beat of each drum in unison. The drum captain gives 4 clicks on his rim and the rest of the drumline responds with a beat.
- After the football team makes a defensive stop on 3rd down, the band plays Raise Up.

== Traditional songs ==
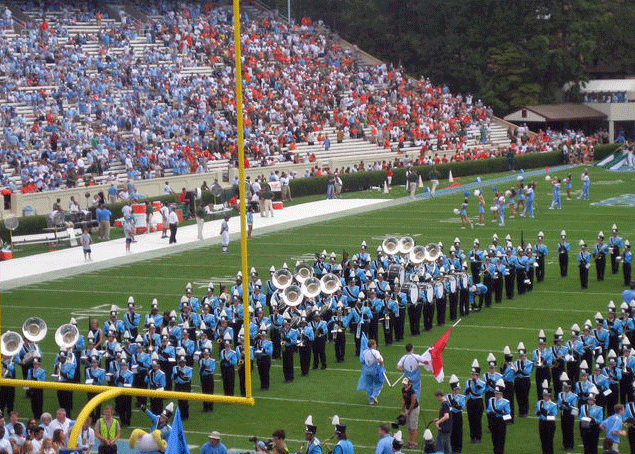
The Marching Tar Heels 2006

The Marching Tar Heels regularly play these songs at athletic events.

- Hark The Sound (Alma Mater)
- Here Comes Carolina
- I'm a Tar Heel Born (Tag)
- Carolina Victory
- Tar Heels On Hand
- Carolina Fight Song (Fight Song)
- UNC Vamp
- Carolina in My Mind
- Sweet Caroline
- Aye! Zigga Zoomba
- 4-C (Carolina Spell Out)
- Visitor's Fight Song 2.0

== Other music ==
Other songs that may be heard on gameday by the Marching Tar Heels are as follows.

- Phantom
- The Imperial March
- Neck
- Raise Up
- Iron Man
- O Fortuna
- Born to be Wild
- Bad Romance
- Misery Business
- Everybody's Everything
- High Hopes (Panic! at the Disco song)
- Theme from Symphony No. 9 (Dvořák)
- Fireball (Pitbull song)
- HandClap
- Take On Me
- Mr. Touchdown, U.S.A.

== Halftime music ==
The Marching Tar Heels have covered many different genres of music during their halftime performances. Generally, a new halftime show is presented at each home game, requiring that some shows be learned in their entirety in one week of practice. Some of these shows have included:

- Queen (2005, 2013)
- Stranger Things (2022)
- Panic! at the Disco (2019)
- The Who (2015)
- Classical Masterworks (2018)
- Latin Jazz (2008)
- Journey (2019)
- Katy Perry (2022)
- Nirvana (2013, 2021)
- Lynyrd Skynyrd (2005)
- Stevie Wonder (2014)
- Elvis Presley (2015)
- Michael Jackson (2008, 2019)
- Earth, Wind, & Fire (2013)
- Beach music (2019)
- Swing music (2007, 2012)
- The Greatest Showman (2018)
- Leonard Bernstein (2019)
- Circus music (2008, 2018, 2025)
- Saturday Morning Cartoons (2015)
- Hollywood Blockbusters (2011, 2013, 2017)

== Directors ==
- Charles T. Woollen 1903-1919
- T. Smith McCorkle 1920-1932
- Earl Slocum 1933-1956
- Herb Fred 1956-1963
- Major John F. Yesulaitis 1964-1989
- James Hile 1990-1996
- Jeffrey Fuchs 1997–Present
