= Albert Coates =

Albert Coates may refer to:

- Albert Coates (musician) (1882–1953), Anglo-Russian conductor and composer
- Albert Coates (surgeon) (1895–1977), Australian surgeon and soldier
- Albert Coates (professor) (1896–1989), founder and long-time director of the Institute of Government at the University of North Carolina

== See also ==
- Al Coates (disambiguation)
