= Al Coates =

Al Coates may refer to:

- Al Coates (broadcaster), Canadian sports broadcaster
- Al Coates (ice hockey) (born 1945), National Hockey League executive

== See also ==
- Albert Coates (disambiguation)
