= Albert Coates (professor) =

American lawyer

Albert Coates (1896–1989) was the founder and long-time director of the Institute of Government at the University of North Carolina.

Coates earned a bachelor's degree from the University of North Carolina in 1918 and an LLB from Harvard University in 1923. Upon graduation, Coates joined the faculty of the University of North Carolina School of Law and taught there until 1969. In 1932, Coates founded the Institute of Government at the University of North Carolina. He served as its director until 1962.
