= University of North Carolina School of Government =

Professional school at the University of North Carolina at Chapel Hill

UNC School of Government
- Former name: Institute of Government
- Type: Public professional school
- Established: 1931; 95 years ago
- Founder: Albert Coates
- Parent institution: University of North Carolina at Chapel Hill
- Dean: Aimee N. Wall
- Location: Chapel Hill, North Carolina, North Carolina, United States
- Website: www.sog.unc.edu

The UNC School of Government is a professional school of the University of North Carolina at Chapel Hill that provides education, advisory services, research, and publications for public officials in North Carolina. The school was founded in 1931 as the Institute of Government by Albert Coates and became part of the university in 1942. The Institute of Government was renamed The School of Government in 2001.

The school serves local and state government officials, judicial officials, and students in public administration. It describes its work as nonpartisan, policy-neutral, and responsive to public officials across North Carolina.

== History ==
The Institute of Government originated in 1931, when Albert Coates proposed a resource for local officials who needed help following changes in law and government across multiple levels of government. Coates organized a steering committee in 1931, held an organizational meeting in 1932, and by September 1932 had held the first training program for public officials.

The institute produced publications for local officials, including Popular Government, and operated a legislative reporting service. In 1939, a building was dedicated for the institute, and in 1942 the institute became part of the University of North Carolina. In 2001, UNC-Chapel Hill established the School of Government, incorporating the institute into the new school.

== Public service and education ==
The School of Government offers courses, webinars, conferences, publications, legal summaries, listservs, online tools, and advisory services related to state and local government and judicial administration. The school states that it offers more than 200 courses, webinars, and specialized conferences each year and serves more than 12,000 public officials from all 100 North Carolina counties annually.

In 2018, consistent with the School's mission, Blue Ridge Public Radio described the school as a nonpartisan and policy-neutral resource for elected officials and reported on its training for newly elected municipal officials in Asheville, North Carolina.

The school is home to the Master of Public Administration program at UNC-Chapel Hill. The UNC MPA program is offered in on-campus and online formats and is accredited by NASPAA, the Network of Schools of Public Policy, Affairs, and Administration.

For the fall 2026 semester, the School debuted the law, government and public service minor for undergraduate students.

The school's Master of Public Administration program is included in the graduate public affairs rankings published by U.S. News & World Report. In the 2026 rankings, the UNC MPA program was ranked No. 20 among public affairs graduate programs and No. 2 in local government management.

== Leadership ==
Aimee N. Wall became dean of the School of Government on February 27, 2023. She previously served as senior associate dean and professor of public law and government at the school. She succeeded Michael R. Smith, who had led the school for three decades.

The school has had five leaders since its founding as the Institute of Government. John L. Sanders served two nonconsecutive terms.

Name	Title	Tenure	Notes
Albert Coates	Director of the Institute of Government	1931-1962	Founder and first director of the Institute of Government.
John L. Sanders	Director of the Institute of Government	1962-1973	Sanders served two separate terms as director.
Henry W. Lewis	Director of the Institute of Government	1973-1979	Lewis led the Institute between Sanders's two terms; a 1975 Institute publication lists him as director.
John L. Sanders	Director of the Institute of Government	1979-1992	Sanders returned to the directorship after serving as the UNC System's vice president for planning.
Michael R. Smith	Director of the Institute of Government; dean of the School of Government	1992-December 31, 2022	Smith was named director in 1992. When the Institute became the School of Government in 2001, his title changed from director to dean.
Aimee N. Wall	Dean of the School of Government	February 27, 2023 – present	Wall previously served as senior associate dean and professor of public law and government at the school.
