= University of North Carolina at Chapel Hill =

Public university in North Carolina, US

- Latin: Universitas Carolinae Septentrionalis in Monte Capellae
- Former names: University of North Carolina (1789–1963)
- Motto: Lux libertas (Latin)
- Motto in English: "Light and liberty"
- Type: Public research university
- Established: December 11, 1789; 236 years ago
- Founder: William Richardson Davie
- Parent institution: University of North Carolina
- Accreditation: SACS
- Academic affiliations: AAU; ORAU; URA
- Endowment: $6.22 billion (2025)
- Chancellor: Lee H. Roberts
- Provost: Magnus Egerstedt
- Faculty: 4,234 (fall 2023)
- Total staff: 13,938 (fall 2023)
- Students: 32,234 (fall 2023)
- Undergraduates: 20,681 (fall 2023)
- Postgraduates: 11,553 (fall 2023)
- Location: Chapel Hill, North Carolina, United States; 35°54′31″N 79°02′57″W
- Campus: 760 acres (310 ha); Small city
- Newspaper: The Daily Tar Heel
- Colors: Carolina blue and white
- Nickname: Tar Heels
- Sporting affiliations: NCAA Division I FBS – ACC
- Mascot: Rameses
- Website: unc.edu

The University of North Carolina at Chapel Hill (UNC Chapel Hill, UNC, North Carolina or Carolina) is a public research university in Chapel Hill, North Carolina, United States. Chartered in 1789, the university began enrolling students in 1795, making it one of the oldest public universities in the United States.

The university offers degrees in over 240-270 distinct academic programs, divided among 13 professional schools and a primary unit, the College of Arts & Sciences. It is classified as "R1: Doctoral Universities – very high research activity" and is a member of the Association of American Universities (AAU). The National Science Foundation ranked UNC–Chapel Hill ninth among American universities for research and development expenditures in 2023 with $1.5 billion. Its endowment is $5.7 billion, making it the ninth-wealthiest public academic institution in the United States as of 2024.

The campus covers 760 acres (310 ha), encompassing the Morehead Planetarium and the many stores and shops located on Franklin Street. Students can participate in over 550 officially recognized student organizations. UNC-Chapel Hill is a charter member of the Atlantic Coast Conference (ACC), which was founded on June 14, 1953. The university's athletic teams compete in 28 intercollegiate sports and are known as the Tar Heels. They have won 51 NCAA team championships in eight different sports which ranks eighth all time, and 52 individual national championships.

UNC-Chapel Hill is one of three corners of North Carolina's Research Triangle. The other two corners are North Carolina State University in Raleigh and Duke University in Durham.

== History ==
University of North Carolina course catalog from June 1819

The University of North Carolina was chartered by the North Carolina General Assembly on December 11, 1789; its cornerstone was laid on October 12, 1793, at Chapel Hill, chosen because of its central location within the state. It is one of three universities that claims to be the oldest public university in the United States, and the only such institution to confer degrees in the eighteenth century as a public institution.

During the Civil War, North Carolina governor David Lowry Swain persuaded Confederate president Jefferson Davis to exempt some students from the draft, so the university was one of the few in the Confederacy that managed to stay open. However, Chapel Hill suffered the loss of more of its population during the war than any village in the South, and when student numbers did not recover, the university was forced to close during Reconstruction from December 1, 1870, until September 6, 1875. Following the reopening, enrollment was slow to increase and university administrators offered free tuition for the sons of teachers and ministers, as well as loans for those who could not afford attendance.

Following the Civil War, the university began to modernize its programs and onboard faculty with prestigious degrees. The creation of a new gymnasium, funding for a new chemistry laboratory, and organization of the Graduate Department were accomplishments touted by UNC president Francis Venable at the 1905 "University Day" celebration.

Despite initial skepticism from university president Frank Porter Graham, on March 27, 1931, legislation was passed to group the University of North Carolina with the State College of Agriculture and Engineering and Woman's College of the University of North Carolina to form the Consolidated University of North Carolina. In 1963, the consolidated university was made fully coeducational, although most women still attended Woman's College for their first two years, transferring to Chapel Hill as juniors, since freshmen were required to live on campus and there was only one women's residence hall. As a result, Woman's College was renamed the "University of North Carolina at Greensboro", and the University of North Carolina became the "University of North Carolina at Chapel Hill".

During World War II, UNC was one of 131 colleges and universities nationally that took part in the V-12 Navy College Training Program which offered students a path to a Navy commission.

In 1951, a court ordered the university to admit the first Black students to the schools of law and medicine. The first students were Harvey Beech, James Lassiter, J. Kenneth Lee, Floyd McKissick, and James Robert Walker in law and Oscar Diggs in medicine. In 1955 after the U.S. Supreme Court outlawed all forms of segregation in the public schools, federal courts ordered the admission of black undergraduates to the university. The first three Leroy Frasier, John Lewis Brandon and Ralph Frasier were from Hillside High School in Durham, North Carolina. Black enrollment remained low for many years. There were four black freshmen in 1960 and only eighteen in 1963.

During the 1960s, the campus was the location of significant political protests. Prior to the passage of the Civil Rights Act of 1964, protests about local racial segregation which began quietly in Franklin Street restaurants led to mass demonstrations and disturbance. The climate of civil unrest prompted the 1963 Speaker Ban Law prohibiting speeches by communists on state campuses in North Carolina. This stand towards the racial segregation on campus led up to the Sit-in movement. The sit-in movement started a new era in North Carolina, which challenged colleges across the south against racial segregation of public facilities. The law was immediately criticized by university chancellor William Brantley Aycock and university president William Friday, but was not reviewed by the North Carolina General Assembly until 1965. Small amendments to allow "infrequent" visits failed to placate the student body, especially when the university's board of trustees overruled new Chancellor Paul Frederick Sharp's decision to allow speaking invitations to Marxist speaker Herbert Aptheker and civil liberties activist Frank Wilkinson; however, the two speakers came to Chapel Hill anyway. Wilkinson spoke off campus, while more than 1,500 students viewed Aptheker's speech across a low campus wall at the edge of campus, christened "Dan Moore's Wall" by The Daily Tar Heel for Governor Dan K. Moore. A group of UNC-Chapel Hill students, led by Student Body President Paul Dickson, filed a lawsuit in U.S. federal court, and on February 20, 1968, the Speaker Ban Law was struck down. In 1969, campus food workers of Lenoir Hall went on strike protesting perceived racial injustices that impacted their employment, garnering the support of student groups and members of the university and Chapel Hill community and leading to state troopers in riot gear being deployed on campus and the state national guard being held on standby in Durham.

From the late 1990s and onward, UNC-Chapel Hill expanded rapidly with a 15% increase in total student population to more than 28,000 by 2007. This was accompanied by the construction of new facilities, funded in part by the "Carolina First" fundraising campaign and an endowment that increased fourfold to more than $2 billion within ten years. Professor Oliver Smithies was awarded the Nobel Prize in Medicine in 2007 for his work in genetics. Additionally, Professor Aziz Sancar was awarded the Nobel Prize in Chemistry in 2015 for his work in understanding the molecular repair mechanisms of DNA.

In 2011, the first of several investigations found fraud and academic dishonesty at the university related to its athletic program. Following a lesser scandal that began in 2010 involving academic fraud and improper benefits with the university's football program, two hundred questionable classes offered by the university's African and Afro-American Studies department came to light. As a result, the university was placed on probation by its accrediting agency in 2015. It was removed from probation in 2016.

That same year, the public universities in North Carolina had to share a budget cut of $414 million, of which the Chapel Hill campus lost more than $100 million in 2011. This followed state budget cuts that trimmed university spending by $231 million since 2007; Provost Bruce Carney said more than 130 faculty members have left UNC since 2009., with poor staff retention. The Board of Trustees for UNC-CH recommended a 15.6 percent increase in tuition, a historically large increase. The budget cuts in 2011 greatly affected the university and set this increased tuition plan in motion and UNC students protested. On February 10, 2012, the UNC Board of Governors approved tuition and fee increases of 8.8 percent for in-state undergraduates across all 16 campuses.

In June 2018, the Department of Education found that the University of North Carolina at Chapel Hill had violated Title IX in handling reports of sexual assault, five years after four students and an administrator filed complaints. The university was also featured in The Hunting Ground, a 2015 documentary about sexual assault on college campuses. Annie E. Clark and Andrea Pino, two students featured in the film, helped to establish the survivor advocacy organization End Rape on Campus.

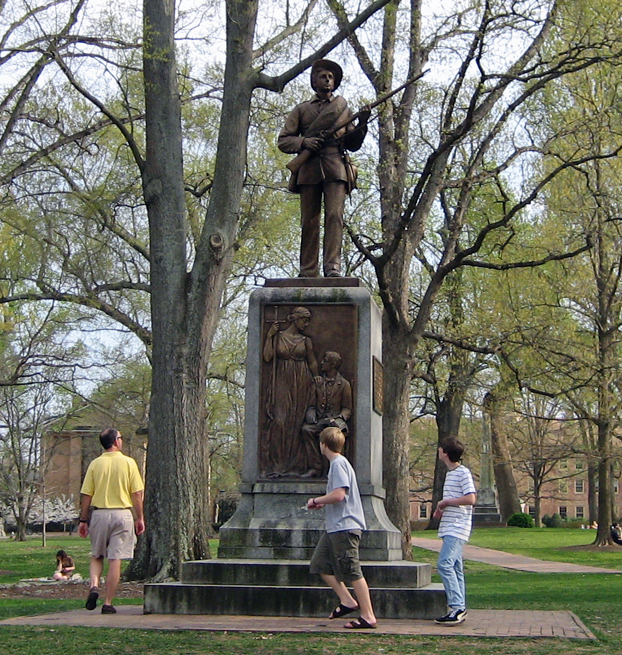
Silent Sam, a former campus statue

In August 2018, the university came to national attention after the toppling of Silent Sam, a Confederate monument which had been erected on campus in 1913 by the United Daughters of the Confederacy. The statue had been dogged by controversy at various points since the 1960s, with critics claiming that the monument invokes memories of racism and slavery. Many critics cited the explicitly racist views espoused in the dedication speech that local industrialist and UNC Trustee Julian Carr gave at the statue's unveiling on June 2, 1913, and the approval with which they had been met by the crowd at the dedication. Shortly before the beginning of the 2018–2019 school year, the Silent Sam was toppled by protestors and damaged, and has been absent from campus ever since. In July 2020, the university's Carr Building, which was named after Julian Carr, was renamed the "Student Affairs Building". Carr had supported white supremacy and also the Ku Klux Klan.

After reopening its campus in August 2020, UNC-Chapel Hill reported 135 new COVID-19 cases and four infection clusters within a week of having started in-person classes for the Fall 2020 semester. On August 10, faculty and staff from several of UNC's constituent institutions filed a complaint against its board of governors, asking the system to default to online-only instruction for the fall. On August 17, UNC's management announced that the university would be moving all undergraduate classes online from August 19, becoming the first university to send students home after having reopened.

Notable leaders of the university include the 26th governor of North Carolina, David Lowry Swain (president 1835–1868); and Edwin Anderson Alderman (1896–1900), who was also president of Tulane University and the University of Virginia. On December 13, 2019, the UNC System Board of Governors unanimously voted to name Kevin Guskiewicz the university's 12th chancellor.

In the early afternoon on August 28, 2023, the second week of the fall semester, a PhD student shot and killed associate professor Zijie Yan in Caudill Labs, a laboratory building near the center of campus.

In April 2024, UNC students joined other campuses across the United States in protests and establishing encampments against the Gaza war and the genocide of Palestinians in Gaza. Students demanded transparency in investments and that UNC divest from Israel. With the administration coming down hard on the protesters, the students called for the protection of their first amendment rights. 36 arrests were made with police clearing out the encampment that was set up in Polk Place. Palestine Legal filed a federal civil rights complaint alleging that there was preferential treatment of Israeli students by UNC, and targeting of pro-Palestine students.

== Campus ==
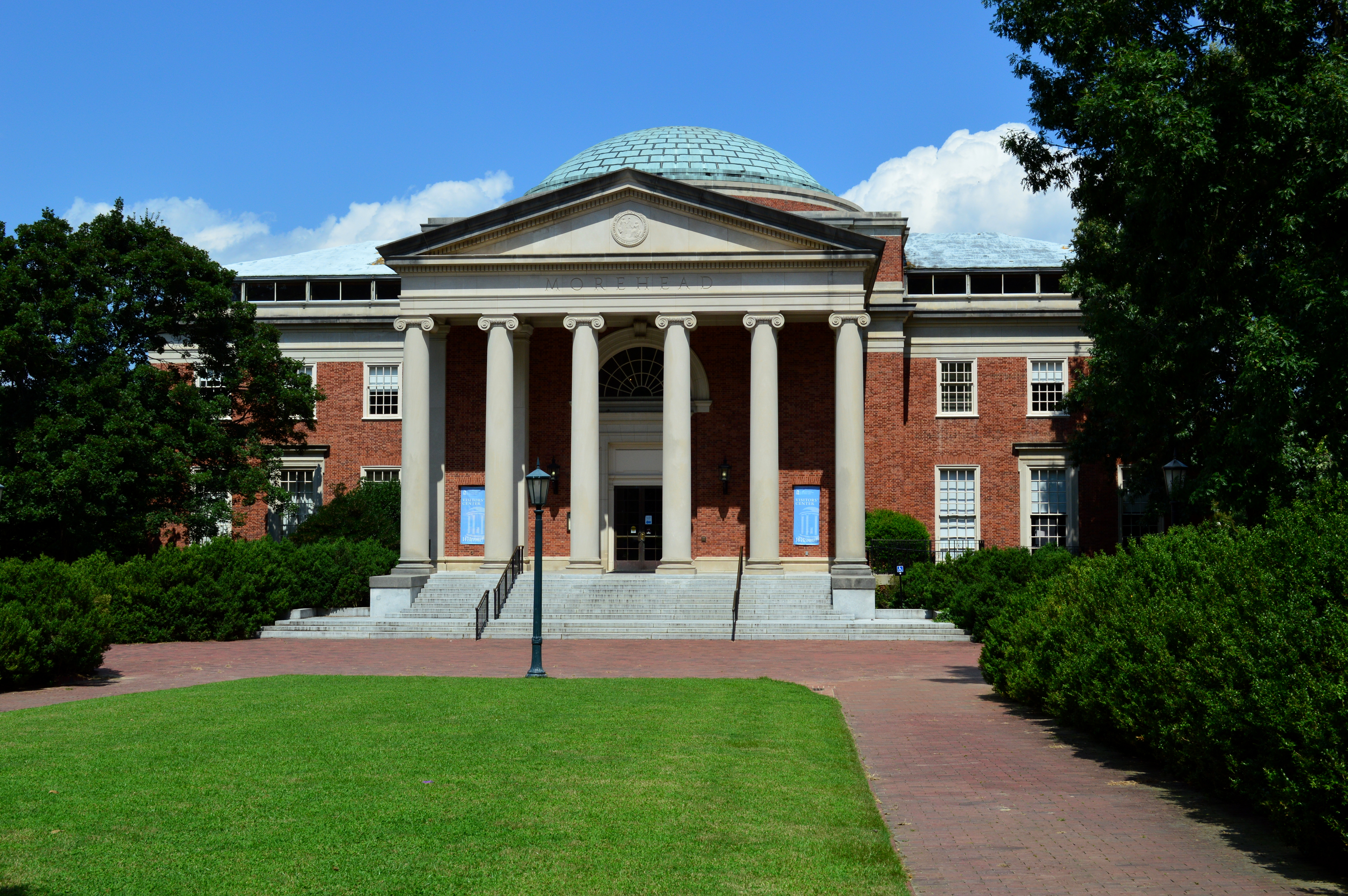
The Morehead Planetarium, designed by Eggers & Higgins, first opened in 1949.

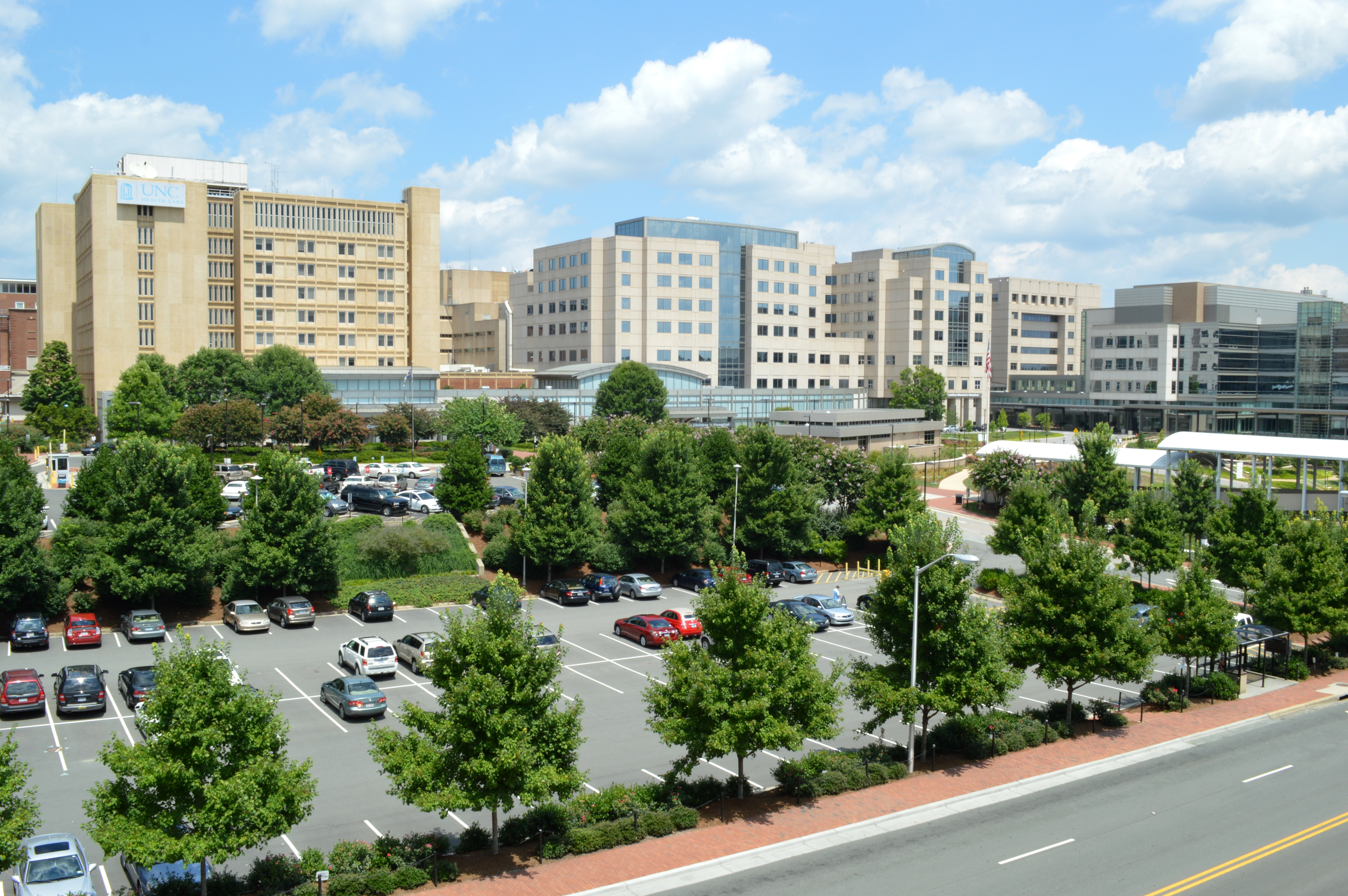
UNC Medical Center

UNC-Chapel Hill's campus covers around 760 acres (310 ha), including about 125 acres (51 ha) of lawns and over 30 acres (12 ha) of shrub beds and other ground cover. In 1999, UNC-Chapel Hill was one of sixteen recipients of the American Society of Landscape Architects Medallion Awards and was identified (in the second tier) as one of 50 college or university "works of art" by T.A. Gaines in his book The Campus as a Work of Art.

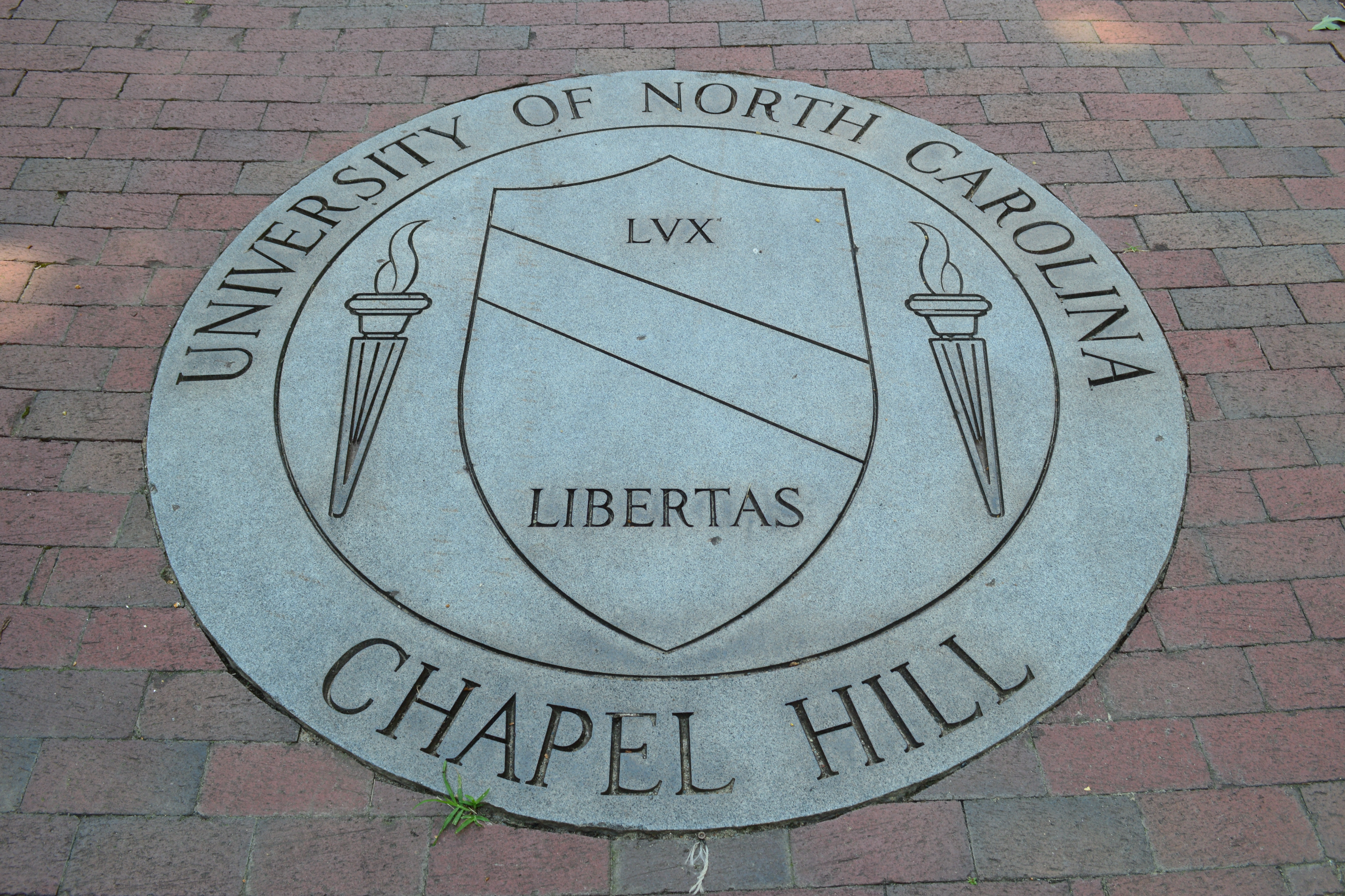
A representation of the university seal, located in front of South Building

The oldest buildings on the campus, including the Old East building (built 1793–1795), the South Building (built 1798–1814), and the Old West building (built 1822–1823), stand around a quadrangle that runs north to Chapel Hill. This is named McCorkle Place after Samuel Eusebius McCorkle, who campaigned for the foundation of the university and was the original author of the bill requesting the university's charter.

A second quadrangle, Polk Place, was built in the 1920s to the south of the original campus, with the South Building on its north side, and named after North Carolina native and university alumnus President James K. Polk. The Wilson Library is at the south end of Polk Place.

McCorkle Place and Polk Place are both in what is the northern part of the campus in the 21st century, along with the Frank Porter Graham Student Union, and the Davis, House, and Wilson libraries. Most university classrooms are located in this area, along with several undergraduate residence halls. The middle part of the campus includes Fetzer Field and Woollen Gymnasium along with the Student Recreation Center, Kenan Memorial Stadium, Irwin Belk outdoor track, Eddie Smith Field House, Boshamer Stadium, Carmichael Auditorium, Sonja Haynes Stone Center for Black Culture and History, School of Government, School of Law, George Watts Hill Alumni Center, Ram's Head complex (with a dining hall, parking garage, grocery store, and gymnasium), and various residence halls. The southern part of the campus houses the Dean Smith Center for men's basketball, Koury Natatorium, School of Medicine, Adams School of Dentistry, Eshelman School of Pharmacy, Gillings School of Global Public Health, UNC Hospitals, Kenan–Flagler Business School, and the newest student residence halls.

=== Campus features ===
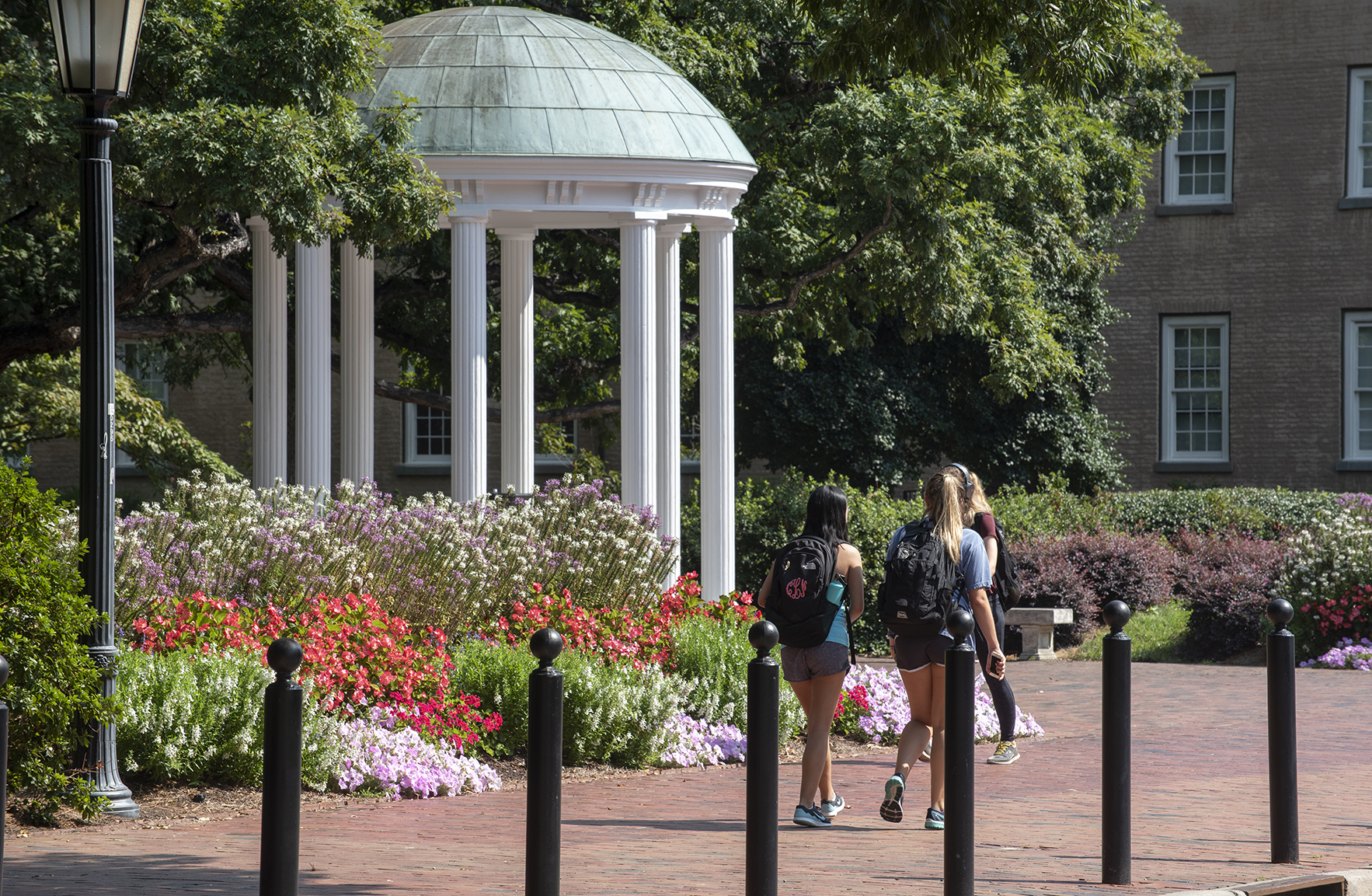
Students walk past the Old Well, a symbol of UNC-Chapel Hill for years

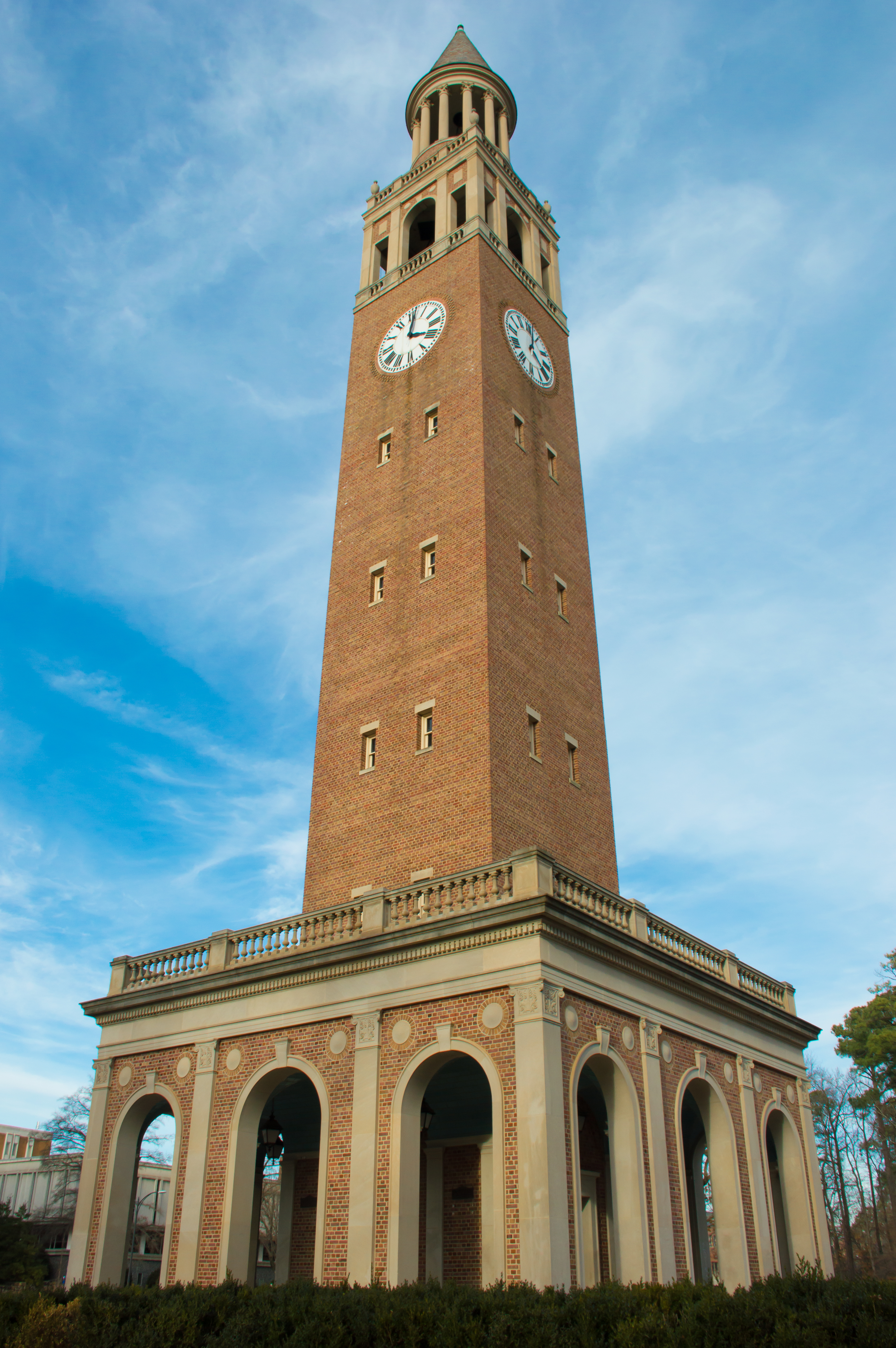
The Morehead–Patterson Bell Tower was completed in 1931 and stands 172 feet tall.

Located in McCorkle Place is the Davie Poplar tree under which a popular legend says the university's founder, William Richardson Davie, selected the location for the university. The legend of the Davie Poplar says that as long as the tree stands, so will the university. However, the name was not associated with the tree until almost a century after the university's foundation. A graft from the tree, named Davie Poplar Jr., was planted nearby in 1918 after the original tree was struck by lightning. A second graft, Davie Poplar III, was planted in conjunction with the university's bicentennial celebration in 1993. The student members of the university's Dialectic and Philanthropic Societies are not allowed to walk on the grass of McCorkle Place out of respect for the unknown resting place of Joseph Caldwell, the university's first president.

A symbol of the university is the Old Well, a small neoclassical rotunda at the south end of McCorkle Place based on the Temple of Love in the Gardens of Versailles, in the same location as the original well that provided water for the school. The well stands at the south end of McCorkle Place, the northern quad, between two of the campus's oldest buildings, Old East, and Old West.

The historic Playmakers Theatre is located on Cameron Avenue between McCorkle Place and Polk Place. It was designed by Alexander Jackson Davis, the same architect who renovated the northern façade of Old East in 1844. The east-facing building was completed in 1851 and initially served as a library and as a ballroom. It was originally named Smith Hall after North Carolina governor General Benjamin Smith, who was a special aide to George Washington during the American Revolutionary War and was an early benefactor to the university. When the library moved to Hill Hall in 1907, the building was transferred between the school of law and the agricultural chemistry department until it was taken over by the university theater group, the Carolina Playmakers, in 1924. It was remodeled as a theater, opening in 1925 as Playmakers Theater. Playmakers Theatre was declared a National Historic Landmark in 1973.

The Morehead–Patterson bell tower, south of the Wilson Library, was commissioned by John Motley Morehead III, the benefactor of the Morehead-Cain Scholarship. The hedge and surrounding landscape was designed by William C. Coker, botany professor and creator of the campus arboretum. Traditionally, seniors have the opportunity to climb the tower a few days prior to May commencement.

=== Environment and sustainability ===
The university has a goal that all new buildings meet the requirements for LEED silver certification, and the Allen Education Center at the university's North Carolina Botanic Garden was the first building in North Carolina to receive LEED Platinum certification.

UNC-Chapel Hill's cogeneration facility produced one-fourth of the electricity and all of the steam used on campus as of 2008. In 2006, the university and the Town of Chapel Hill jointly agreed to reduce greenhouse gas emissions 60% by 2050, becoming the first town-gown partnership in the country to make such an agreement. Through these efforts, the university achieved an "A−" grade on the Sustainable Endowment Institute's College Sustainability Report Card 2010.

The university was criticized in 2019 for abandoning a promise to shutter its coal-fired power plant by 2020. Initially, the university has announced plans to become carbon neutral by 2050, but in 2021, the plan was changed to 2040. In December 2019, the university was sued by the Sierra Club and the Center for Biological Diversity for violations of the Clean Air Act.

== Academics ==
=== Graduate & Professional programs ===
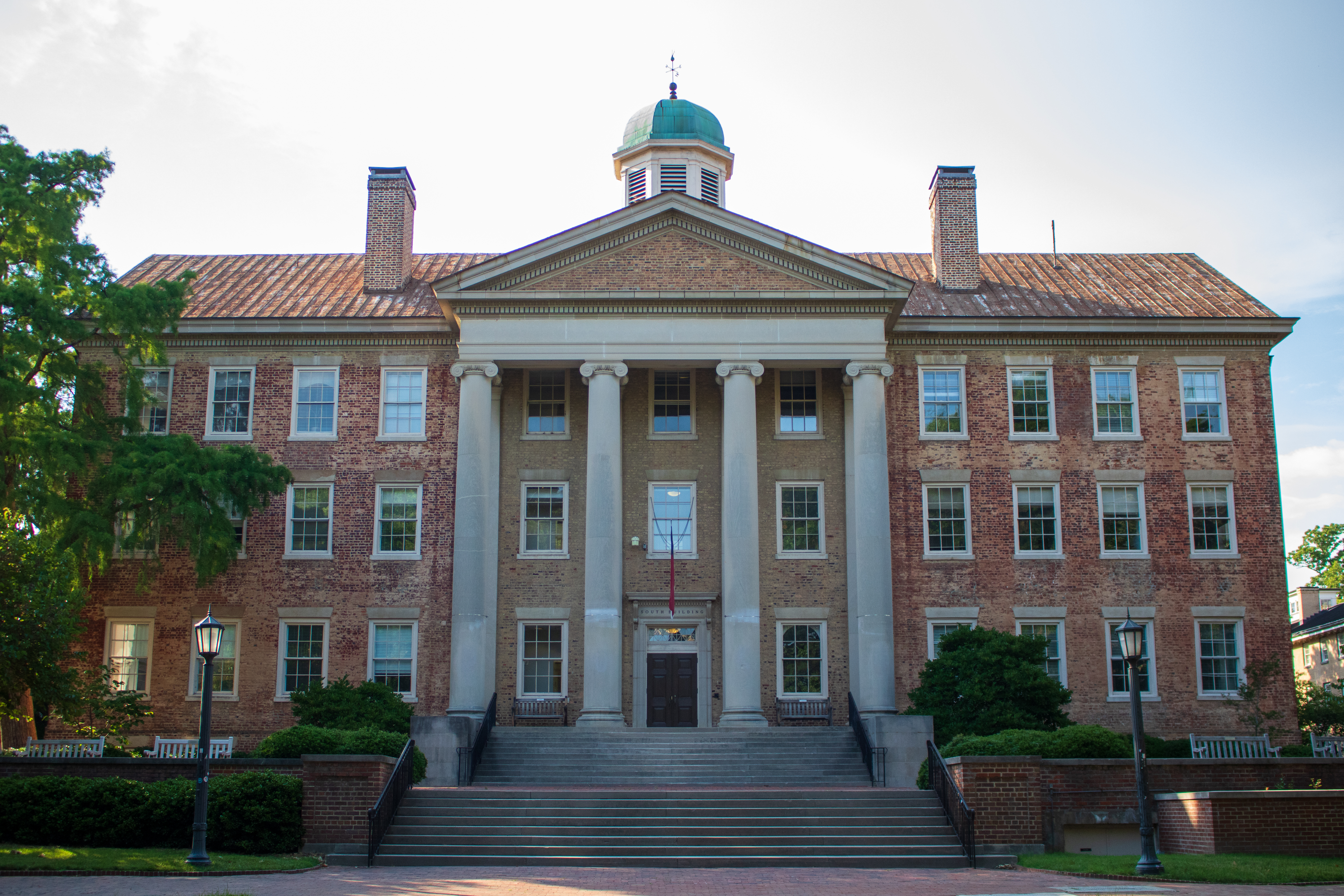
South Building, administrative offices of the chancellor and College of Arts and Sciences

- UNC College of Arts & Sciences
- UNC School of Government
- UNC Hussman School of Journalism and Media
- UNC Adams School of Dentistry
- The Graduate School
- UNC School of Medicine
- UNC School of Education
- UNC School of Law
- UNC School of Nursing
- UNC Eshelman School of Pharmacy
- UNC Kenan–Flagler Business School
- UNC School of Social Work
- UNC School of Information and Library Science
- UNC Gillings School of Global Public Health
- UNC School of Data Science & Society
- UNC School of Civic Life & Leadership

=== Curriculum ===
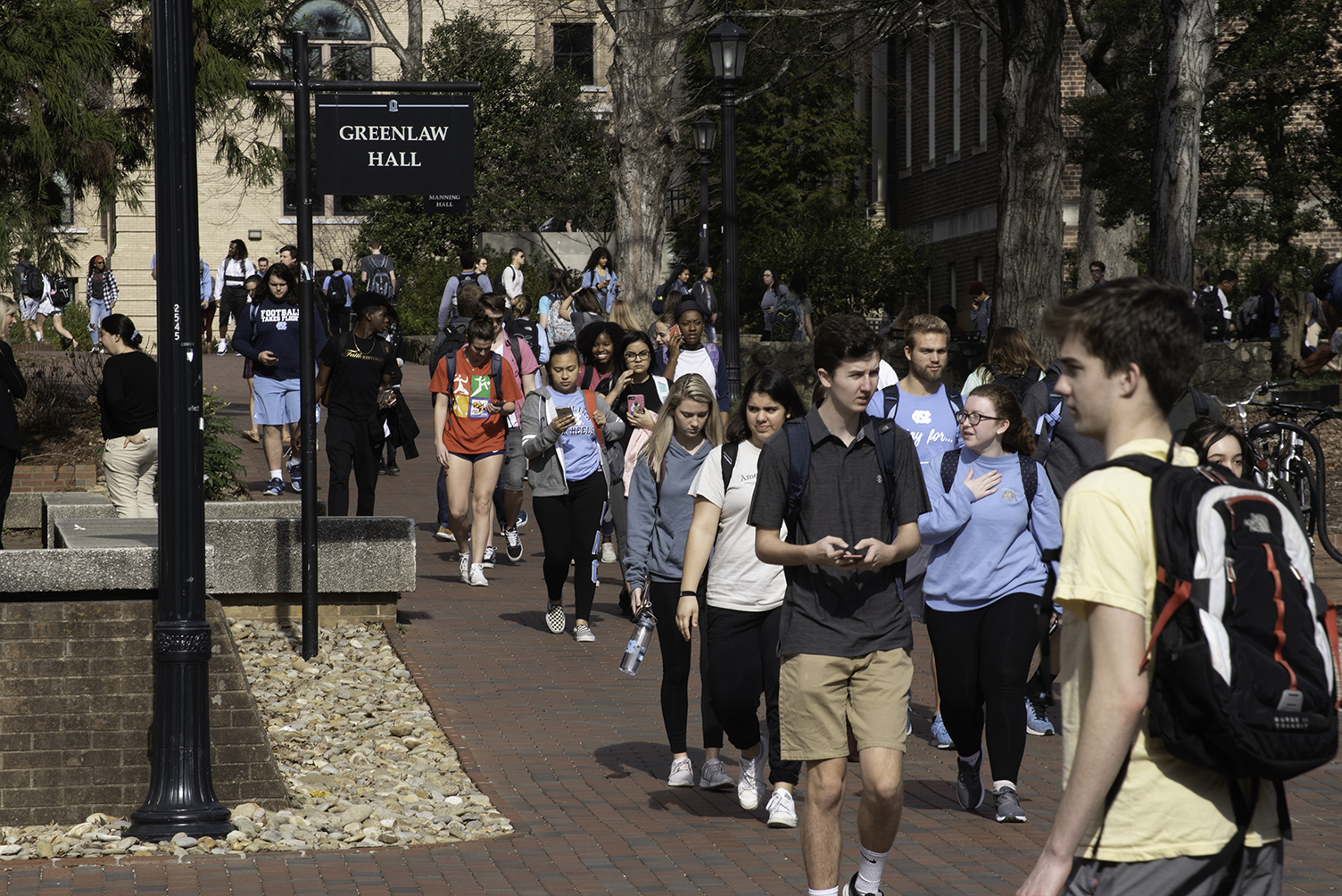
Students on campus between classes

As of 2007, UNC-Chapel Hill offered 71 bachelor's, 107 master's and 74 doctoral degree programs. The university enrolls students from all 100 North Carolina counties and state law requires that the percentage of students from North Carolina in each freshman class meet or exceed 82%. The student body consists of 17,981 undergraduate students and 10,935 graduate and professional students (as of Fall 2009). Racial and ethnic minorities comprise 30.8% of UNC-Chapel Hill's undergraduate population as of 2010 and applications from international students more than doubled in five years from 702 in 2004 to 1,629 in 2009. Eighty-nine percent of enrolling first year students in 2009 reported a GPA of 4.0 or higher on a weighted 4.0 scale. The most popular majors at UNC-Chapel Hill in 2009 were biology, business administration, psychology, media and journalism, and political science. UNC-Chapel Hill also offers 300 study abroad programs in 70 countries.

At the undergraduate level, all students must fulfill a number of general education requirements as part of the Making Connections curriculum, which was introduced in 2006. English, social science, history, foreign language, mathematics, and natural science courses are required of all students, ensuring that they receive a broad liberal arts education. The university also offers a wide range of first year seminars for incoming freshmen. After their second year, students move on to the College of Arts and Sciences, or choose an undergraduate professional school program within the schools of medicine, nursing, business, education, pharmacy, information and library science, public health, or media and journalism. Undergraduates are held to an eight-semester limit of study.

=== Undergraduate admissions ===
Undergraduate admissions statistics
- 2022 entering class
- Admit rate: 16.8% (▼ −8.4)
- Yield rate: 45.9% ( +0.9)

Test scores middle 50%^{[i]}
- SAT Total: 1350-1510 (among 15% of FTFs)
- ACT Composite: 29–34 (among 60% of FTFs)

UNC-Chapel Hill's admissions process is "most selective" according to U.S. News & World Report. For the Class of 2025 (enrolled fall 2021), UNC-Chapel Hill received 53,776 applications and accepted 10,347 (19.2%). Of those accepted, 4,689 enrolled, a yield rate (the percentage of accepted students who choose to attend the university) of 45.3%. UNC-Chapel Hill's freshman retention rate is 96.5%, with 91.9% going on to graduate within six years.

Of the 60% of enrolled freshmen in 2021 who submitted ACT scores; the middle 50 percent Composite score was between 29 and 33. Of the 15% of the incoming freshman class who submitted SAT scores; the middle 50 percent Composite scores were 1330–1500. In the 2020–2021 academic year, 20 freshman students were National Merit Scholars. The university is need-blind for domestic applicants.

=== Honor code ===
The university has a longstanding honor code known as the "Instrument of Student Judicial Governance", supplemented by a mostly student-run honor system to resolve issues with students accused of academic and conduct offenses against the university community.

In 1974, the Judicial Reform Committee created the Instrument of Student Judicial Governance, which outlined the current honor code and its means for enforcement. The creation of the instrument and the judicial reform committee was preceded by a list of "Demands by the Black Student Movement" (BSM) which stated that "[e]ither Black students have full jurisdiction over all offenses committed by Black students or duly elected Black Students from BSM who would represent our interests be on the present Judiciary Courts." Until 2024, most academic and conduct violations were handled by a single, student-run honor system. Prior to the student-run honor system, the Dialectic and Philanthropic Societies, along with other campus organizations such as the men's council, women's council, and student council supported student concerns. In 2024, the university transitioned from the student-run honor system to a staff-run "hearing board".

=== Libraries ===
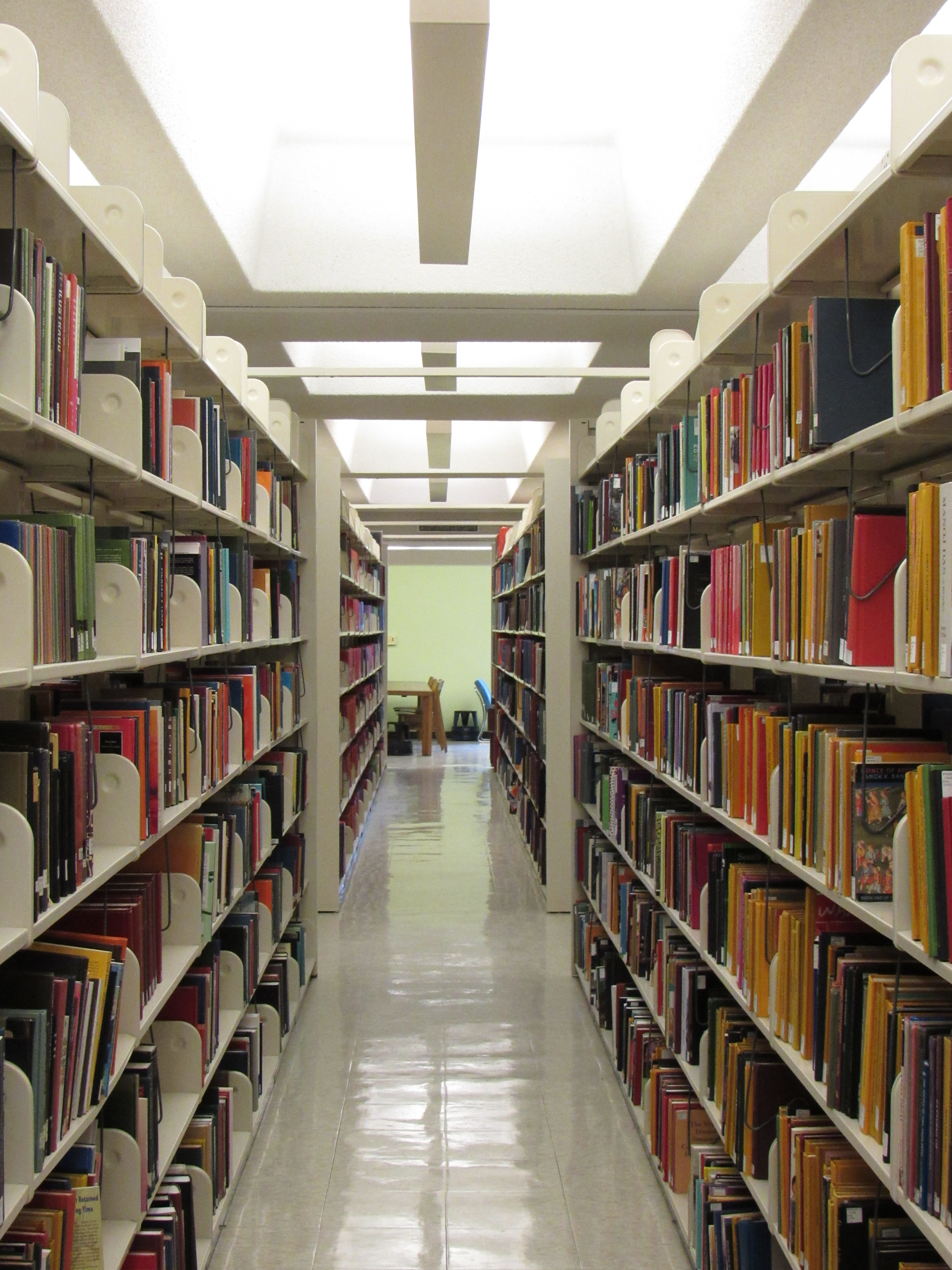
Davis Library

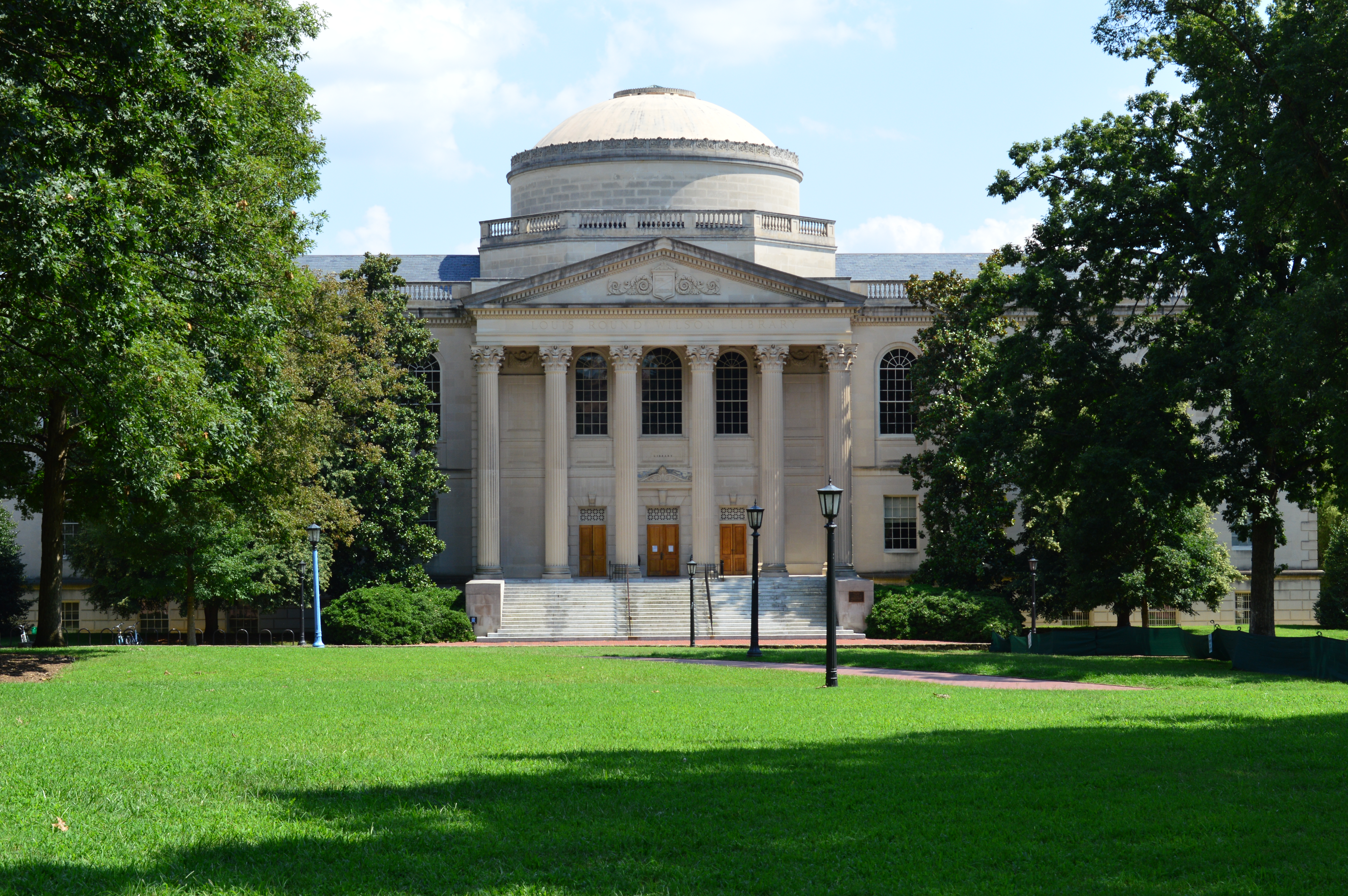
Louis Round Wilson Library opened in 1929 and houses special collections.

UNC-Chapel Hill's library system includes a number of individual libraries housed throughout the campus and holds more than 10 million combined print and electronic volumes. As of 2025, there were 12 library locations in operation. UNC-Chapel Hill's North Carolina Collection (NCC) is the largest and most comprehensive collection of holdings about any single state nationwide. The unparalleled assemblage of literary, visual, and artifactual materials documents four centuries of North Carolina history and culture. The North Carolina Collection is housed in Wilson Library, named after Louis Round Wilson, along with the Southern Historical Collection, the Rare Books Collection, and the Southern Folklife Collection. The university is home to ibiblio, one of the world's largest collections of freely available information including software, music, literature, art, history, science, politics, and cultural studies.

The Davis Library, situated near the Pit, is the main library and the largest academic facility and state-owned building in North Carolina. It was named after North Carolina philanthropist Walter Royal Davis and opened on February 6, 1984. The first book checked out of Davis Library was George Orwell's 1984. The R.B. House Undergraduate Library is located between the Pit area and Wilson Library. It is named after Robert B. House, the Chancellor of UNC from 1945 to 1957, and opened in 1968. In 2001, the R.B. House Undergraduate Library underwent a $9.9 million renovation that modernized the furnishings, equipment, and infrastructure of the building. Prior to the construction of Davis, Wilson Library was the university's main library, but now Wilson hosts special events and houses special collections, rare books, and temporary exhibits.

==== Documenting the American South ====
The library oversees Documenting the American South, a free public access website of "digitized primary materials that offer Southern perspectives on American history and culture." The project began in 1996. In 2009 the library launched the North Carolina Digital Heritage Center, a statewide digital library, in partnership with other organizations.

=== Rankings and reputation ===
Academic rankings

National
- Forbes: 31
- U.S. News & World Report: 26 (tie)
- Washington Monthly: 19
- WSJ/College Pulse: 59

Global
- ARWU: 35
- QS: =140
- THE: 70
- U.S. News & World Report: 51

For 2026, U.S. News & World Report ranked UNC-Chapel Hill 4th among the public universities and 26nd among national universities in the United States. The Wall Street Journal ranked UNC-Chapel Hill 3rd best public university behind University of Michigan and UCLA.

The university was named a Public Ivy by Richard Moll in his 1985 book The Public Ivies: A Guide to America's Best Public Undergraduate Colleges and Universities, and in later guides by Howard and Matthew Greene.

The university is a large recipient of National Institute of Health grants and funds. For fiscal year 2020, the university received $509.9 million in NIH funds for research. This amount makes Chapel Hill the 10th overall recipient of research funds in the nation by the NIH.

=== Scholarships ===
For decades, UNC-Chapel Hill has offered an undergraduate merit scholarship known as the Morehead-Cain Scholarship. Recipients receive full tuition, room and board, books, and funds for summer study for four years. Since the inception of the Morehead, 29 alumni of the program have been named Rhodes Scholars. Since 2001, North Carolina has also co-hosted the Robertson Scholars Leadership Program, a merit scholarship and leadership development program granting recipients full student privileges at both UNC-Chapel Hill and neighboring Duke University. Additionally, the university provides scholarships based on merit and leadership qualities, including the Carolina, Colonel Robinson, Johnston and Pogue Scholars programs.

In 2003, Chancellor James Moeser announced the Carolina Covenant, wherein UNC offers a debt free education to low-income students who are accepted to the university. The program was the first of its kind at a public university and the second overall in the nation (following Princeton University). About 80 other universities have since followed suit.

== Athletics ==
UNC Athletics logo

North Carolina's athletic teams are known as the Tar Heels. They compete as a member of the National Collegiate Athletic Association (NCAA) Division I level (Football Bowl Subdivision (FBS) sub-level for football), primarily competing in the Atlantic Coast Conference (ACC) for all sports since the 1953–54 season. Men's sports include baseball, basketball, cross country, fencing, football, golf, lacrosse, soccer, swimming & diving, tennis, track & field and wrestling; while women's sports include basketball, cross country, fencing, field hockey, golf, gymnastics, lacrosse, rowing, soccer, softball, swimming and diving, tennis, track & field and volleyball.

The NCAA refers to UNC-Chapel Hill as the "University of North Carolina" for athletics. As of December 2024, the university had won 51 NCAA team championships in eight different sports, tied for 7th all-time. These include twenty two NCAA championships in women's soccer, eleven in women's field hockey, five in men's lacrosse, six in men's basketball, one in women's basketball, one in women's tennis, three in women's lacrosse, and two in men's soccer. Consensus collegiate national athletes of the year from North Carolina include Rachel Dawson, Erin Matson, Katelyn Falgowski, Ryleigh Heck, Ashley Hoffman, Leslie Lyness, Cindy Werley in field hockey; Phil Ford, Kenny Smith, Sean May, Lennie Rosenbluth, Tyler Hansbrough, Jerry Stackhouse, Antawn Jamison, James Worthy and Michael Jordan in men's basketball; and Mia Hamm (twice), Yael Averbuch, Amber Brooks, Crystal Dunn, Whitney Engen, Kate Faasse, Lorrie Fair, Meredith Florance, April Henrichs, Debbie Keller, Casey Nogueira, Heather O'Reilly, Cindy Parlow, Catherine Reddick, Lindsay Tarpley, Shannon Higgins, Kristine Lilly, and Tisha Venturini in women's soccer.

=== Men's basketball ===
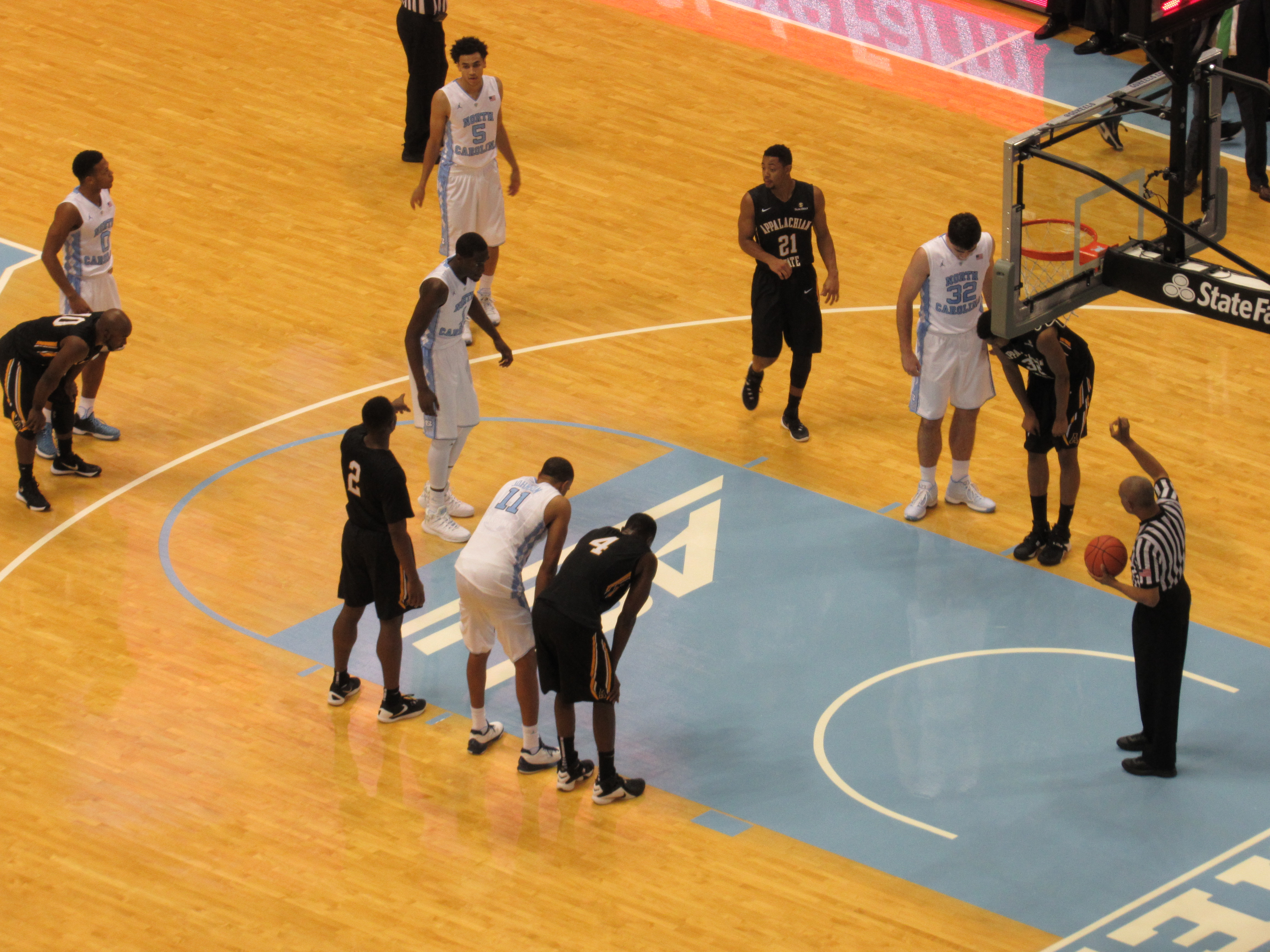
A UNC Basketball game at the Dean Smith Center

Carolina has enjoyed long success as one of the top college basketball programs in the country. The program claims seven national championship teams, six NCAA National Championships and one retroactive championship, for the 1924. This championship was awarded by the Helms Foundation and the Premo-Porretta Power Poll. UNC has also won eighteen Atlantic Coast Conference tournament (ACC) titles, and thirty-three ACC regular season titles.

Under coach Frank McGuire, the Tar Heels won one national championship in 1957. The 1956-57 team went undefeated on their way to the school's first NCAA tournament championship. McGuire was succeeded by Dean Smith. After struggling early in his tenure, Smith entrenched the Tar Heels as a basketball powerhouse over his 36 years as head coach. At the time of his retirement, Smith's 879 wins set the record for the most wins of any men's college basketball head coach. Under Smith, the Tar Heels won two national championships, 13 ACC Tournament championships, and one NIT Championship. Smith is also credited with popularizing the four corners, which he employed until the introduction of the shot clock in college basketball. Smith is also credited with developing "The Carolina Way," epitomized by his motto of "Play hard, play smart, play together," and by other team-oriented practices including "point to the passer," where the player who scores a basket thanks his teammate for the assist.

In 2003, Roy Williams, an assistant under Smith from 1978 to 1988 and the head coach of Kansas, returned to his alma mater. In Williams' second season as head coach, the Tar Heels won the 2005 NCAA national championship. Williams would go on to win two more national titles (2009 and 2017) in his 18 seasons as Tar Heel head coach. Williams passed his mentor Smith's 879 win total, finishing his career with 903 wins, 485 of which came in Chapel Hill.

Williams retired on April 1, 2021, and was replaced by assistant coach Hubert Davis. Davis, who played for Tar Heels from 1988 to 1992 under Smith, also had a lengthy career as an NBA player, and spent several seasons as an analyst for ESPN before being hired by Williams as an assistant coach in 2012. He became the first African American head coach for UNC men's basketball, and led the team to its NCAA-record 21st final four in the 2021–22 season. On March 24, 2026, Carolina fired Davis after five seasons at the helm.

=== Women's soccer ===
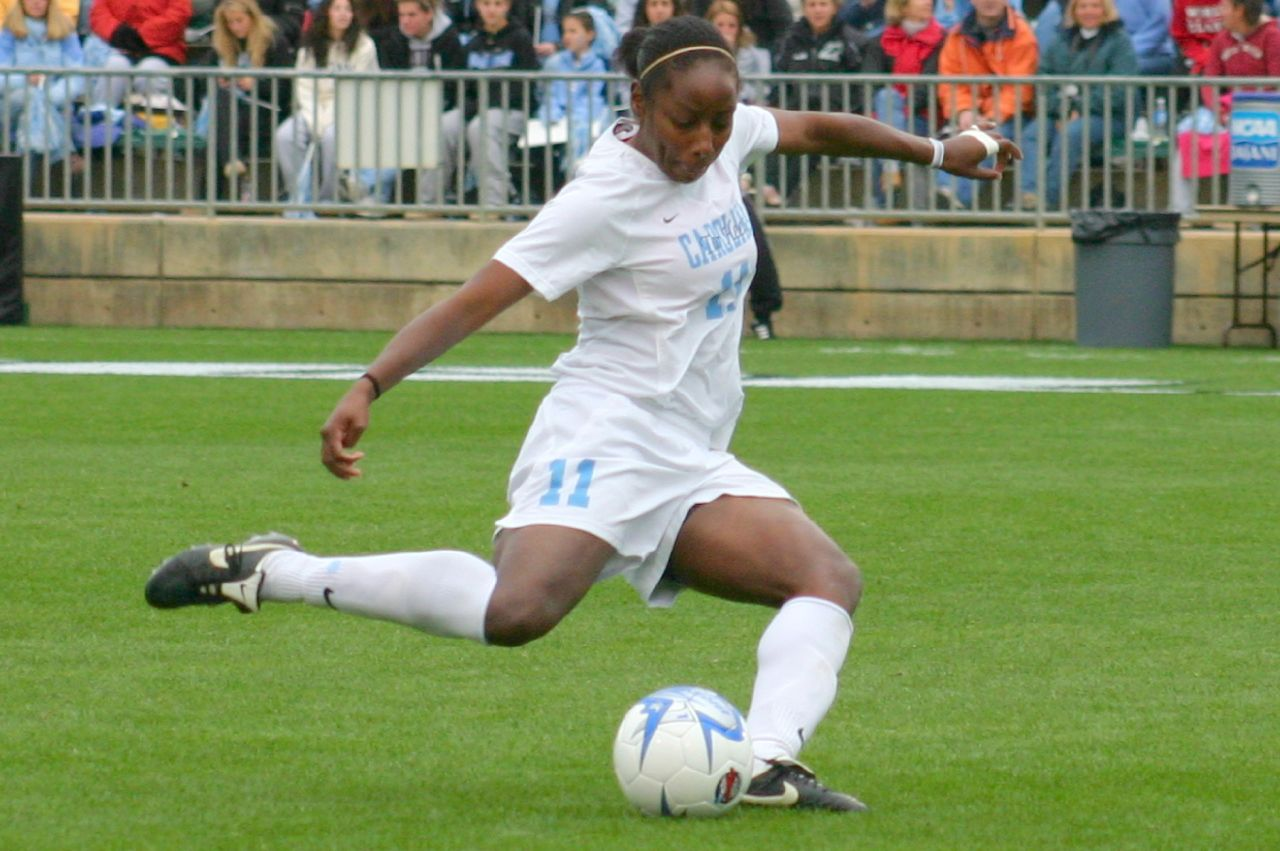
2006 women's soccer player Robyn Gayle

Anson Dorrance coached the women's soccer team at Carolina from its inception in 1979 until 2024. In his 46 years as head coach, Dorrance won 38 ACC championships and 22 national championships on the way to over 1,000 victories as a head coach. In 2019, following the demolition of Fetzer Field, a new combination soccer and lacrosse stadium was opened on the same site, named Dorrance Field in his honor. Damon Nahas replaced Anson Dorrance as interim head coach prior to the 2024 season and was promoted to head coach on December 9, 2024.

=== Field hockey ===
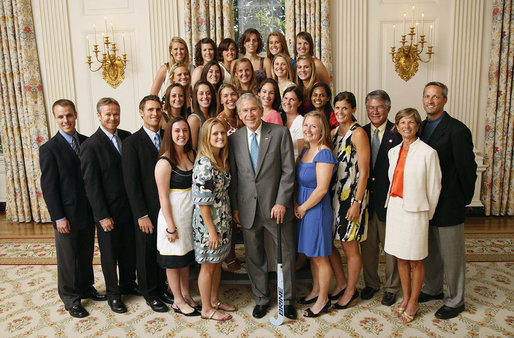
2007 field hockey team with President George W. Bush

Karen Shelton led the Carolina field hockey program for 42 years prior to her retirement following the 2022 season. She won 10 NCAA national championships and 25 ACC titles, both records for the sport. Shelton was replaced by former star player Erin Matson, who herself was a member of four of UNC's national championship teams (2018–2020, 2022), and is the only athlete to win the ACC's player of the year award five times. In Matson's first season in 2023, she led the Tar Heels to their 11th national title, becoming the youngest head coach ever to win a Division I national title in any sport (at age 23).

=== Mascot and nickname ===
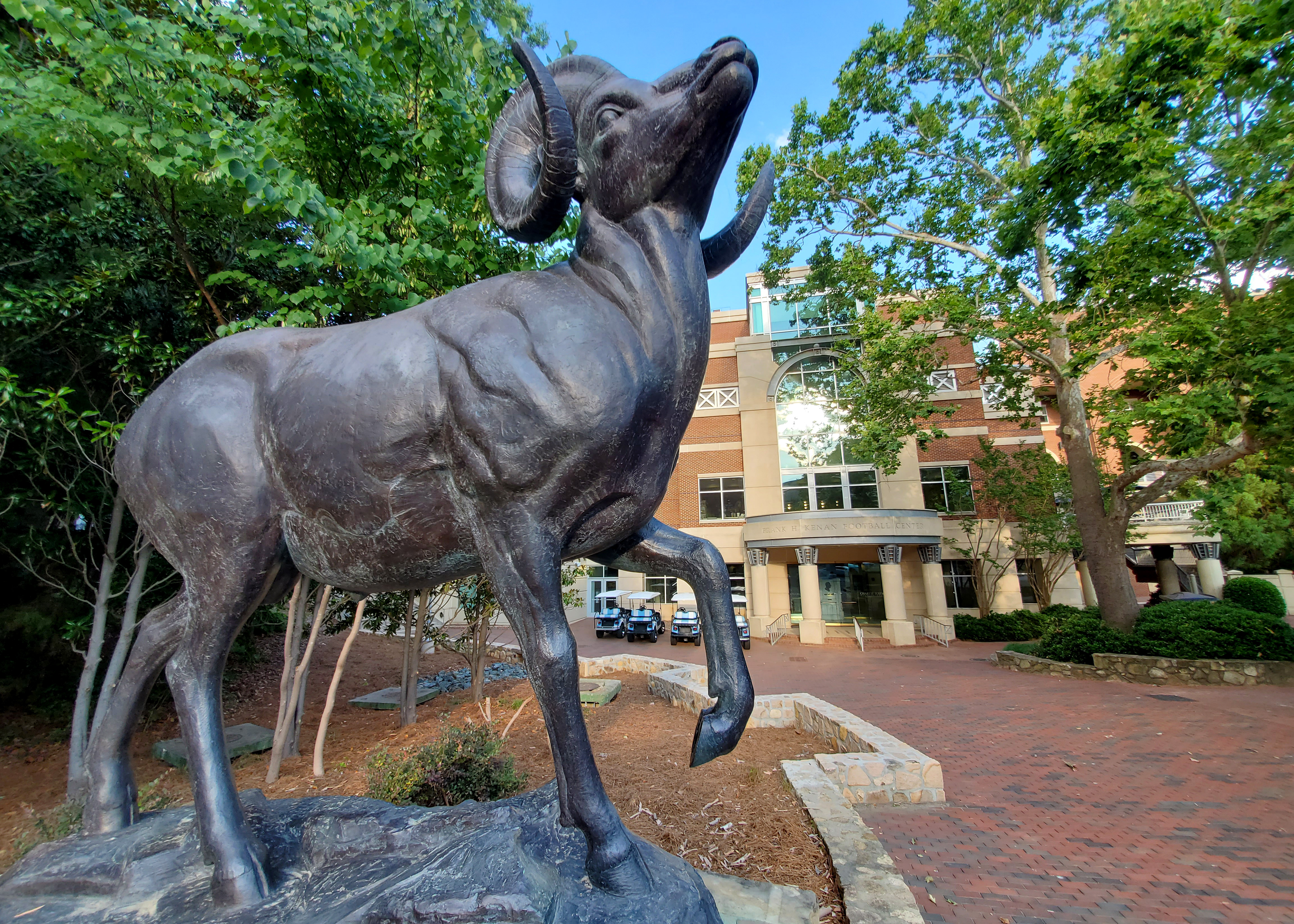
Campus statue of the ram mascot

Duke University's "Blue Devil" mascot and UNC's Rameses face off at the 1957 Victory Bell football game.

The university's teams are nicknamed the "Tar Heels", in reference to the state's eighteenth-century prominence as a tar and pitch producer. The nickname's cultural relevance, however, has a complex history that includes anecdotal tales from both the American Civil War and the American Revolution. The mascot is a live Dorset ram named Rameses, a tradition that dates back to 1924, when the team manager brought a ram to the annual game against Virginia Military Institute, inspired by the play of former football player Jack "The Battering Ram" Merrit. The kicker rubbed his head for good luck before a game-winning field goal, and the ram stayed. There is also an anthropomorphic ram mascot who appears at games. The modern Rameses is depicted in a sailor's hat, a reference to a United States Navy flight training program that was attached to the university during World War II.

=== The Carolina Way ===
Basketball coach Dean Smith was widely known for his idea of "The Carolina Way", in which he challenged his players to, "Play hard, play smart, play together." "The Carolina Way" was an idea of excellence in the classroom, as well as on the court. In Coach Smith's book, The Carolina Way, former player Scott Williams said, regarding Dean Smith, "Winning was very important at Carolina, and there was much pressure to win, but Coach cared more about our getting a sound education and turning into good citizens than he did about winning."

The October 22, 2014, release of the Wainstein Report alleged institutionalized academic fraud that involved over 3,100 students and student athletes, over an 18-year period from 1993 to 2011 that began during the final years of the Dean Smith era, challenged "The Carolina Way" image. The report alleged that at least 54 players during the Dean Smith era were enrolled in what came to be known as "paper classes". The report noted that the questionable classes began in the spring of 1993, the year of Smith's final championship, so those grades would not have been entered until after the championship game was played. In response to the allegations of the Wainstein report, the NCAA launched their own investigation and on June 5, 2015 the NCAA accused the institution of five major violations including: "two instances of unethical conduct and failure to cooperate" as well as "unethical conduct and extra benefits related to student-athletes' access to and assistance in the paper courses; unethical conduct by the instructor/counselor for providing impermissible academic assistance to student-athletes; and a failure to monitor and lack of institutional control". In October 2017, the NCAA issued its findings and concluded "that the only violations in this case are the department chair's and the secretary's failure to cooperate".

=== Rivalries ===
The South's Oldest Rivalry between North Carolina and its first opponent, the University of Virginia, was prominent throughout the first third of the twentieth century. The 119th meeting in football between two of the top public universities in the east occurred in October 2014.

One of the fiercest rivalries is with Durham's Duke University. Located only eight miles from each other, the schools regularly compete in both athletics and academics. The Carolina-Duke rivalry is most intense, however, in basketball. With a combined eleven national championships in men's basketball, both teams have been frequent contenders for the national championship for the past thirty years. The rivalry has been the focus of several books, including Will Blythe's To Hate Like This Is to Be Happy Forever and was the focus of the HBO documentary Battle for Tobacco Road: Duke vs Carolina.

Carolina holds an in-state rivalry with fellow Tobacco Road school, North Carolina State University. Combined, the two schools hold eight NCAA Championships and 27 ACC Championships in basketball. Students from each school often exchange pranks before basketball and football games.

=== Rushing Franklin ===
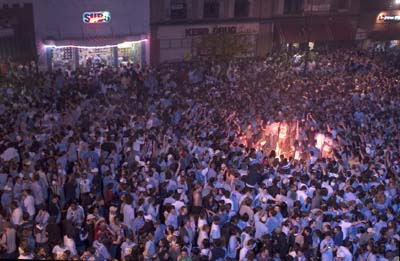
Celebration on Franklin Street after victory over Duke

While students previously held "Beat Duke" parades on Franklin Street before sporting events, today students and sports fans have been known to spill out of bars and residence halls upon the victory of one of Carolina's sports teams. In most cases, a Franklin Street "bonfire" celebration is due to a victory by the men's basketball team, although other Franklin Street celebrations have stemmed from wins by the women's basketball team and women's soccer team. The first known student celebration on Franklin Street came after the 1957 men's basketball team capped their perfect season with a national championship victory over the Kansas Jayhawks. From then on, students have flooded the street after important victories. After a Final Four victory in 1981 and the men's basketball team won the 1982 NCAA Championship, Franklin Street was painted blue by the fans who had rushed the street.

=== School colors ===
Since the beginning of intercollegiate athletics at UNC in the late nineteenth century, the school's colors have been blue and white. The colors were chosen years before by the Dialectic (blue) and Philanthropic (white) Societies, the oldest student organization at the university. The school had required participation in one of the clubs, and traditionally the "Di"s were from the western part of North Carolina while the "Phi"s were from the eastern part of the state.

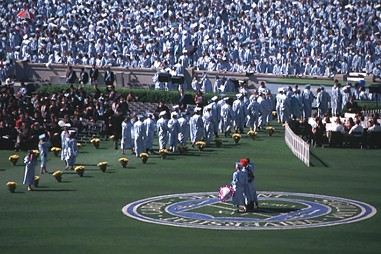
The 2007 commencement ceremony in Kenan Stadium

Society members would wear a blue or white ribbon at university functions, and blue or white ribbons were attached to their diplomas at graduation. On public occasions, both groups were equally represented, and eventually both colors were used by processional leaders to signify the unity of both groups as part of the university. When football became a popular collegiate sport in the 1880s, the Carolina football team adopted the light blue and white of the Di-Phi Societies as the school colors.

=== School songs ===
Notable among a number of songs commonly played and sung at various events such as commencement, convocation, and athletic games are the university fight songs "I'm a Tar Heel Born" and "Here Comes Carolina". The fight songs are often played by the bell tower near the center of campus, as well as after major victories. "I'm a Tar Heel Born" originated in the late 1920s as a tag to the school's alma mater, "Hark The Sound".

== Student life ==
Student body composition as of May 2, 2022
Race and ethnicity	Total
White	57%
Asian	12%
Hispanic	9%
Black	8%
Other (Note: Other consists of Multiracial Americans & those who prefer to not say.)	8%
Foreign national	4%
Economic diversity
Low-income (Note: The percentage of students who received an income-based federal Pell grant intended for low-income students.)	22%
Affluent (Note: The percentage of students who are a part of the American middle class at the bare minimum.)	78%

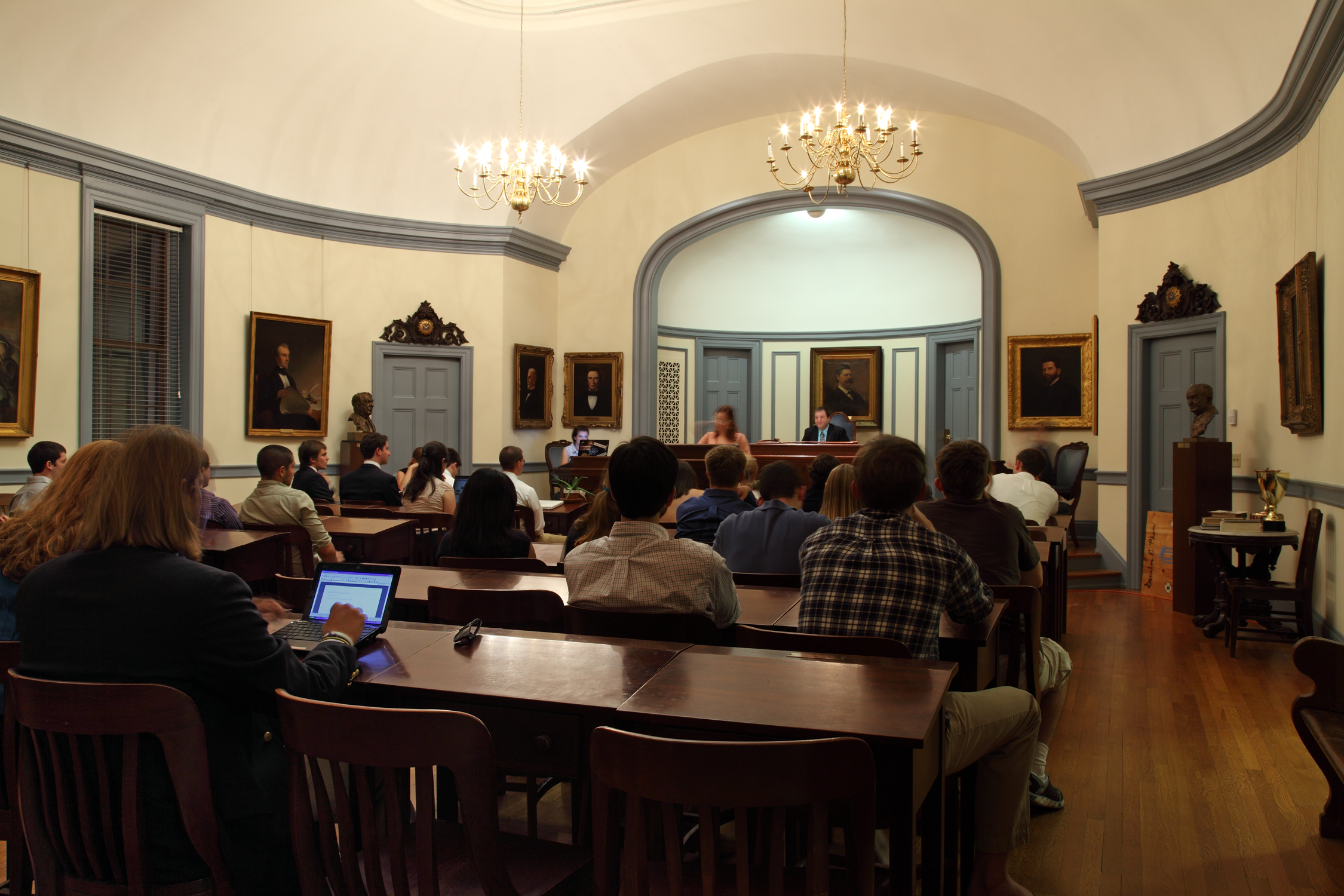
The Dialectic and Philanthropic Societies of UNC were founded in 1795 and have debates each week in the New West building.

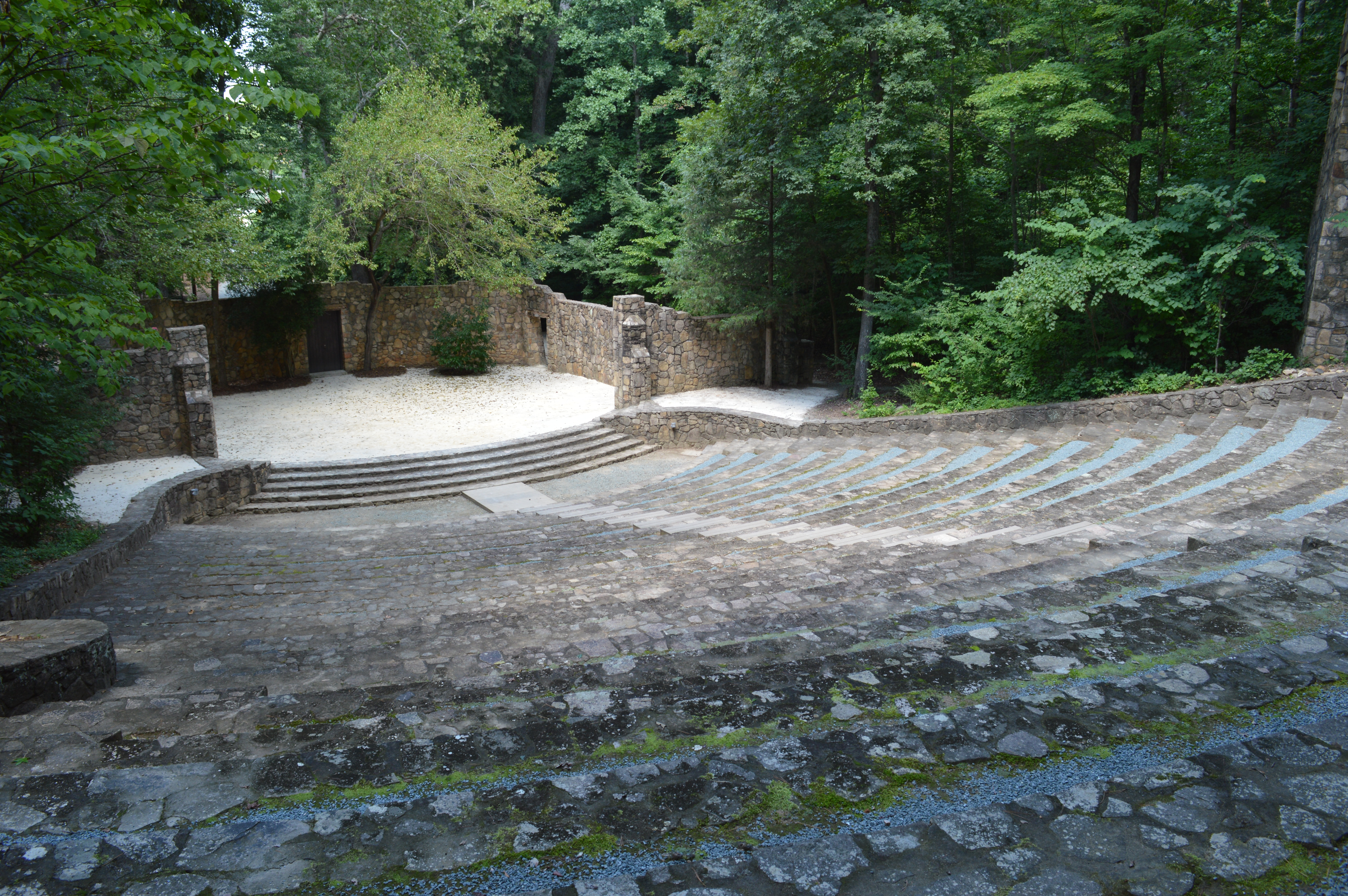
The Forest Theatre was first used for outdoor drama in 1916 to celebrate the tercentenary of Shakespeare's death.

=== Organizations and activities ===
Most student organizations at UNC-Chapel Hill are officially recognized and provided with assistance by the Carolina Union, an administrative unit of the university. Funding is derived from the student government student activity fee, which is allocated at the discretion of the Undergraduate Senate (UGS) or the Graduate and Professional Student Government Senate (GPSG Senate).

The largest student fundraiser, the UNC Dance Marathon, involves thousands of students, faculty, and community members in raising funds for the North Carolina Children's Hospital. The organization conducts fundraising and volunteer activities throughout the year and, as of 2008, had donated $1.4 million since its inception in 1999.

The student-run newspaper The Daily Tar Heel received the 2004–2005 National Pacemaker Award from the Associated Collegiate Press. Founded in 1977, WXYC 89.3 FM is UNC-Chapel Hill's student radio station that broadcasts 24 hours a day, 365 days a year. Programming is left up to student DJs. WXYC typically plays little heard music from a wide range of genres and eras. On November 7, 1994, WXYC became the first radio station in the world to broadcast its signal over the internet. A student-run television station, STV, airs on the campus cable and throughout the Chapel Hill Spectrum system. Founded in 1948 as successor to the Carolina Magazine, the Carolina Quarterly, edited by graduate students, has published the works of numerous authors, including Wendell Berry, Raymond Carver, Don DeLillo, Annie Dillard, Joyce Carol Oates, and John Edgar Wideman. Works appearing in the Quarterly have been anthologized in Best American Short Stories and New Stories from the South and have won the Pushcart and O. Henry Prizes.

The Clef Hangers (also known as the Clefs) are the university's oldest a cappella group, founded by Barry Saunders in 1977. The group has since won several Contemporary A Cappella Recording Awards (CARAs), including Best Soloist in the song Easy, featured on the 2003 album Breeze. They have won two more CARAs for Best Male Collegiate Songs for My Love on Time Out (2008), and for Ain't Nothing Wrong on Twist (2009). Members have included Brendan James, who graduated in 2002, and Anoop Desai, who graduated in 2008.

The Residence Hall Association, the school's third-largest student-run organization, is the representative organization for students living in residence halls. Its activities include social, educational, and philanthropic programs for residents; recognizing outstanding residents and members; and helping residents develop into successful leaders. RHA is the affiliated to the National Association of College and University Residence Halls.

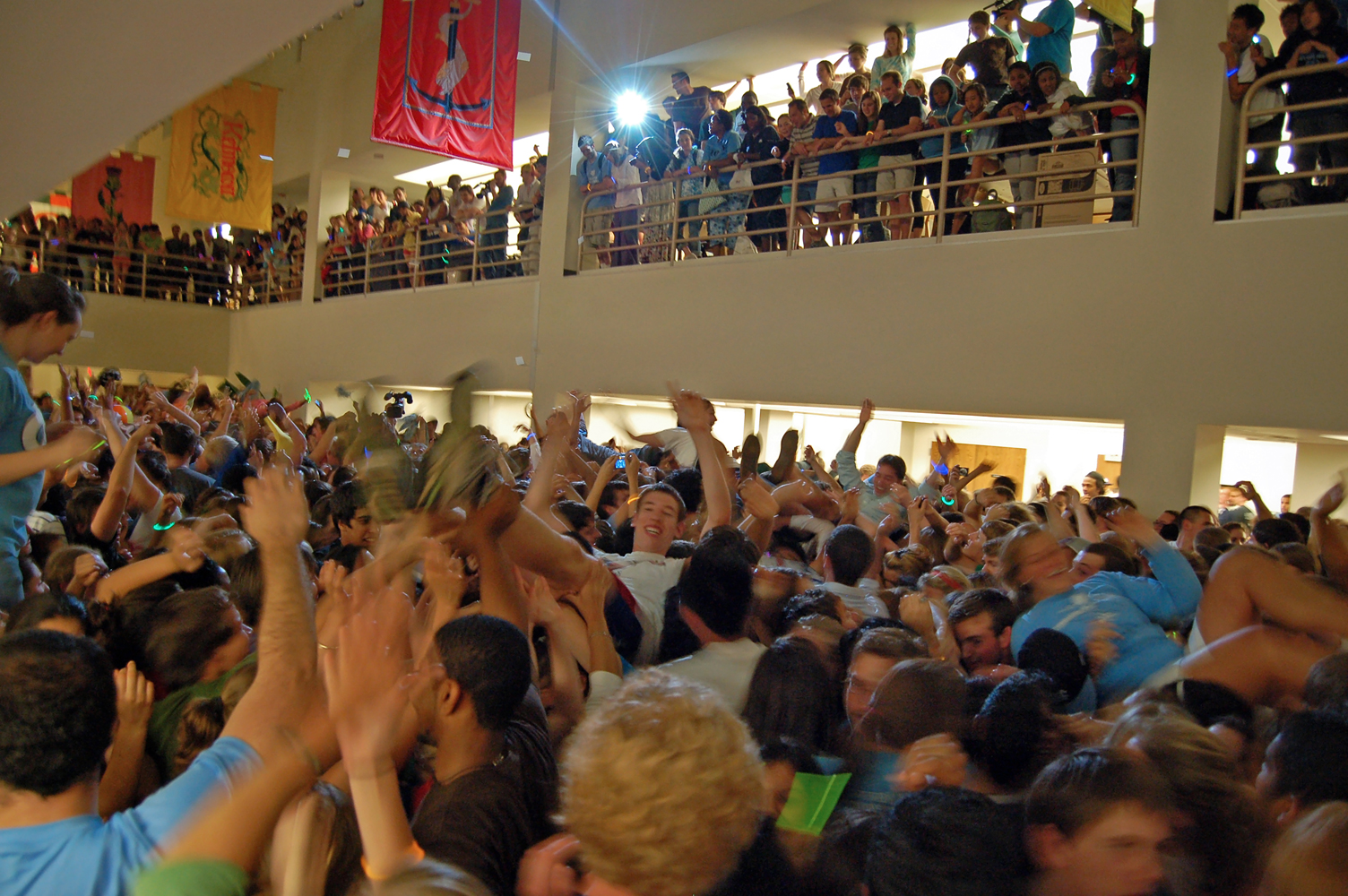
At the end of each semester, students organize a flash mob dance party in the library.

UNC also has a biannual naked run. On the day before final exams, students gather on the 8th floor of the Davis Library, strip naked, and streak down through the floors and back up. This is done to deal with exam stress and to increase body positivity.

The athletic teams at the university are supported by The Marching Tar Heels, the university's marching band. The entire 275-member volunteer band is present at every home football game, and smaller pep bands play at all home basketball games. Each member of the band is also required to play in at least one of five pep bands that play at athletic events of the 26 other sports.

UNC-Chapel Hill has a regional theater company in residence, the Playmakers Repertory Company, and hosts regular dance, drama, and music performances on campus. The school has an outdoor stone amphitheatre known as Forest Theatre used for weddings and drama productions. Forest Theatre is dedicated to Professor Frederick Koch, the founder of the Carolina Playmakers and the father American folk drama.

Many fraternities and sororities on campus belong to the National Panhellenic Conference (NPC), Interfraternity Council (IFC), Greek Alliance Council, and National Pan-Hellenic Council (NPHC). As of spring 2023, sixteen percent of undergraduates were in fraternities or sororities (3131 out of 17,160 total). UNC-Chapel Hill also offers professional and service fraternities that do not have houses but are still recognized by the school. Some of the campus honor societies include: the Order of the Golden Fleece, the Order of the Grail-Valkyries, the Order of the Old Well, the Order of the Bell Tower, and the Frank Porter Graham Honor Society.

=== Student government ===
The student government at UNC–Chapel Hill is split into undergraduate student government and graduate and professional student government. The undergraduate student government consists of an executive branch headed by the student body president and a legislative branch, the undergraduate student senate. The graduate and professional student government similarly consists of an executive (with its own president) and a legislative senate. There is also a joint governance council that approves legislation affecting both undergraduate and graduate and professional students and advises the undergraduate and graduate and professional student governments. The honor system is similarly split into two branches covering undergraduate students and graduate and professional students. The Student Supreme Court, the other part of the judicial branch, consists of four associate justices and a chief justice, which are appointed by the student body president and confirmed by a two thirds vote of the senate for their part of the student body.

=== Dining ===
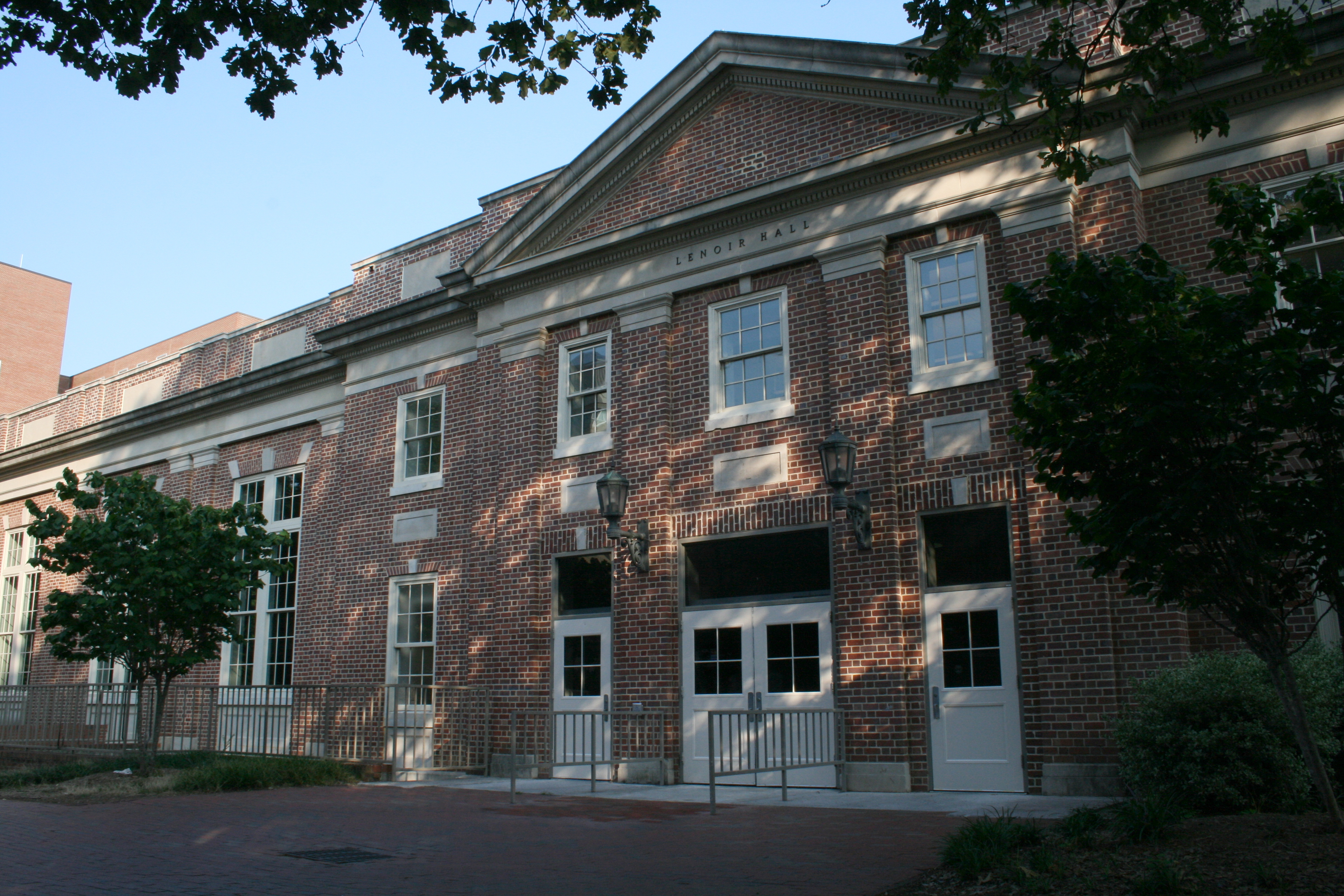
Lenoir Hall

Lenoir Dining Hall was completed in 1939 using funds from the New Deal era Public Works Administration, and opened for service to students when they returned from Christmas holidays in January 1940. The building was named for General William Lenoir, the first chairman of the Board of Trustees of the university in 1790. Since its inception, Lenoir Dining Hall has remained the flagship of Carolina Dining Services and the center of dining on campus. It has been renovated twice, in 1984 and 2011, to improve seating and ease mealtime rushes.

Chase Hall was originally built in 1965 to offer South Campus dining options and honor former UNC President Harry Woodburn Chase, who served from 1919 to 1930. In 2005, the building was torn down to make way for the Student and Academic Services buildings, and was rebuilt north of the original location as the Rams Head Center (with the inner dining hall officially titled Chase Dining Hall). Due to students nicknaming the dining hall Rams Head, the university officially reinstated Chase Hall as the building name in March 2017. It includes the Chase Dining Hall, the Rams Head Market, and a conference room called the "Blue Zone". Chase Dining Hall seats 1,300 people and has a capacity for serving 10,000 meals per day. It continues to offer more food service options to the students living on south campus, and features extended hours including the 9 pm – 12 am period referred to as "Late Night".

=== Housing ===
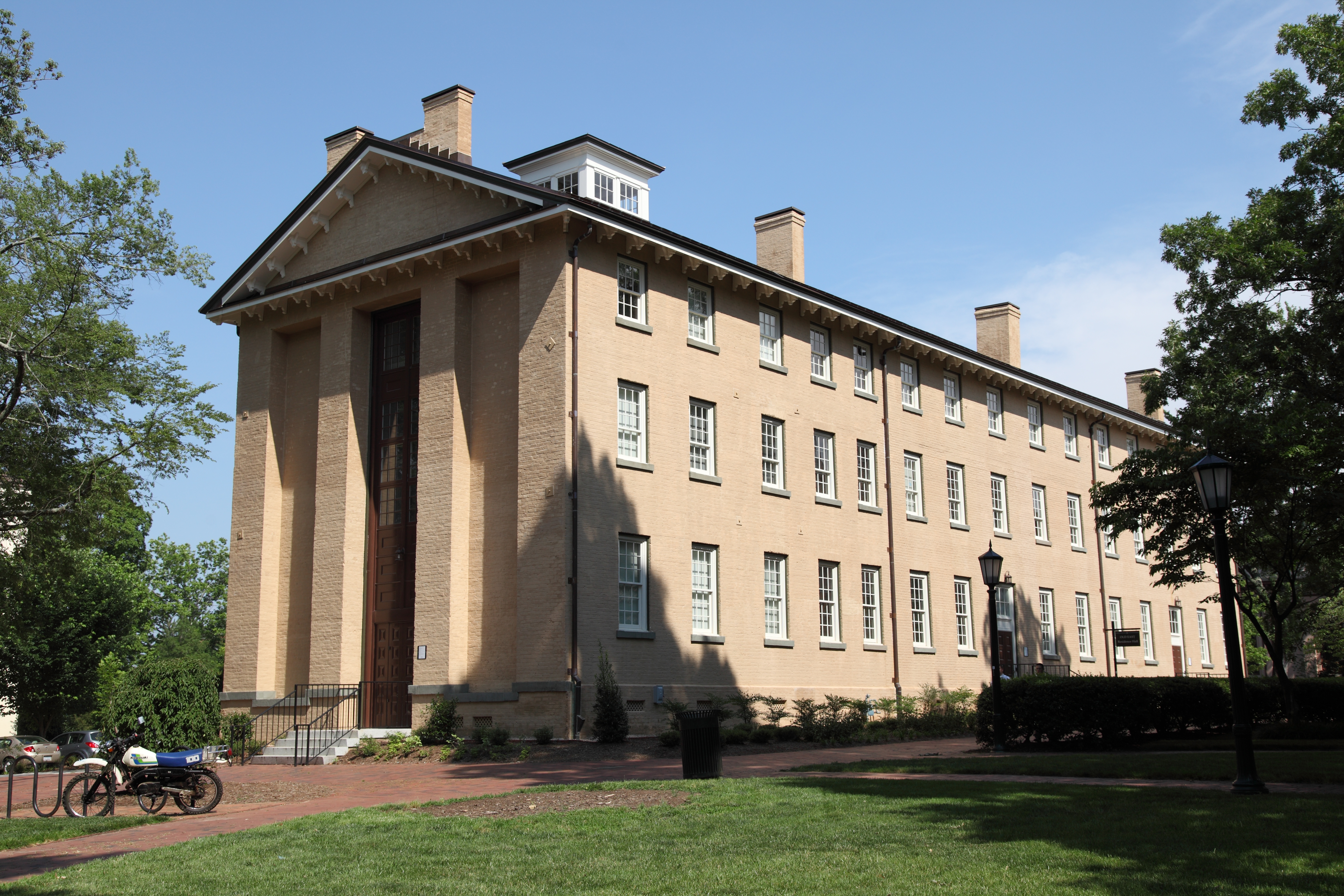
Old East Residence Hall, built in 1793

On campus, the Department of Housing and Residential Education manages thirty-two residence halls, grouped into thirteen communities. These communities range from Olde Campus Upper Quad Community which includes Old East Residence Hall, the oldest building of the university, to modern communities such as Manning West, completed in 2002. First year students are required to live in one of the eight "First Year Experience" residence halls, most of which are located on South Campus. In addition to residence halls, the university oversees an additional eight apartment complexes organized into three communities, Ram Village, Odum Village, and Baity Hill Student Family Housing. Along with themed housing focusing on foreign languages and substance-free living, there are also "living-learning communities" which have been formed for specific social, gender-related, or academic needs. An example is UNITAS, sponsored by the Department of Anthropology, where residents are assigned roommates on the basis of cultural or racial differences rather than similarities. Three apartment complexes offer housing for families, graduate students, and some upperclassmen. Along with the rest of campus, all residence halls, apartments, and their surrounding grounds are smoke-free. As of 2008, 46% of all undergraduates live in university-provided housing.

== Alumni ==
With over 300,000 living former students, UNC has one of the largest and most active alumni groups in America. Many Tar Heels have attained local, national, and international prominence. In politics, these have included James K. Polk, who served as the 11th president of the United States from 1845 to 1849, and William R. King, the thirteenth Vice President of the United States. Tar Heels have also made a mark on pop culture, with figures including Thomas Wolfe, the author of Look Homeward, Angel and Of Time and the River, and Andy Griffith, star of The Andy Griffith Show. Sports stars have included basketball players Charlie Scott, Bob McAdoo, Phil Ford, Walter Davis, Bobby Jones, Billy Cunningham, Michael Jordan, James Worthy, Sam Perkins, Kenny Smith, Rick Fox, Vince Carter, Antawn Jamison, Jerry Stackhouse, and Rasheed Wallace who all played under Dean Smith, Danny Green, and Tyler Hansbrough who both played under Roy Williams, football players Lawrence Taylor, Julius Peppers, Willie Parker, Dré Bly, Hakeem Nicks, Mitchell Trubisky, Charlie Justice, Jeff Saturday and Drake Maye, soccer players Mia Hamm, Cindy Parlow Cone, Heather O'Reilly, Yael Averbuch West, Crystal Dunn, and Olympians April Heinrichs and Vikas Gowda. In business, alumni include Jason Kilar, former CEO of Hulu, Howard R. Levine, former CEO and chair of Family Dollar, and David Holz, founder of Midjourney.

Notable UNC-Chapel Hill Alumni include:

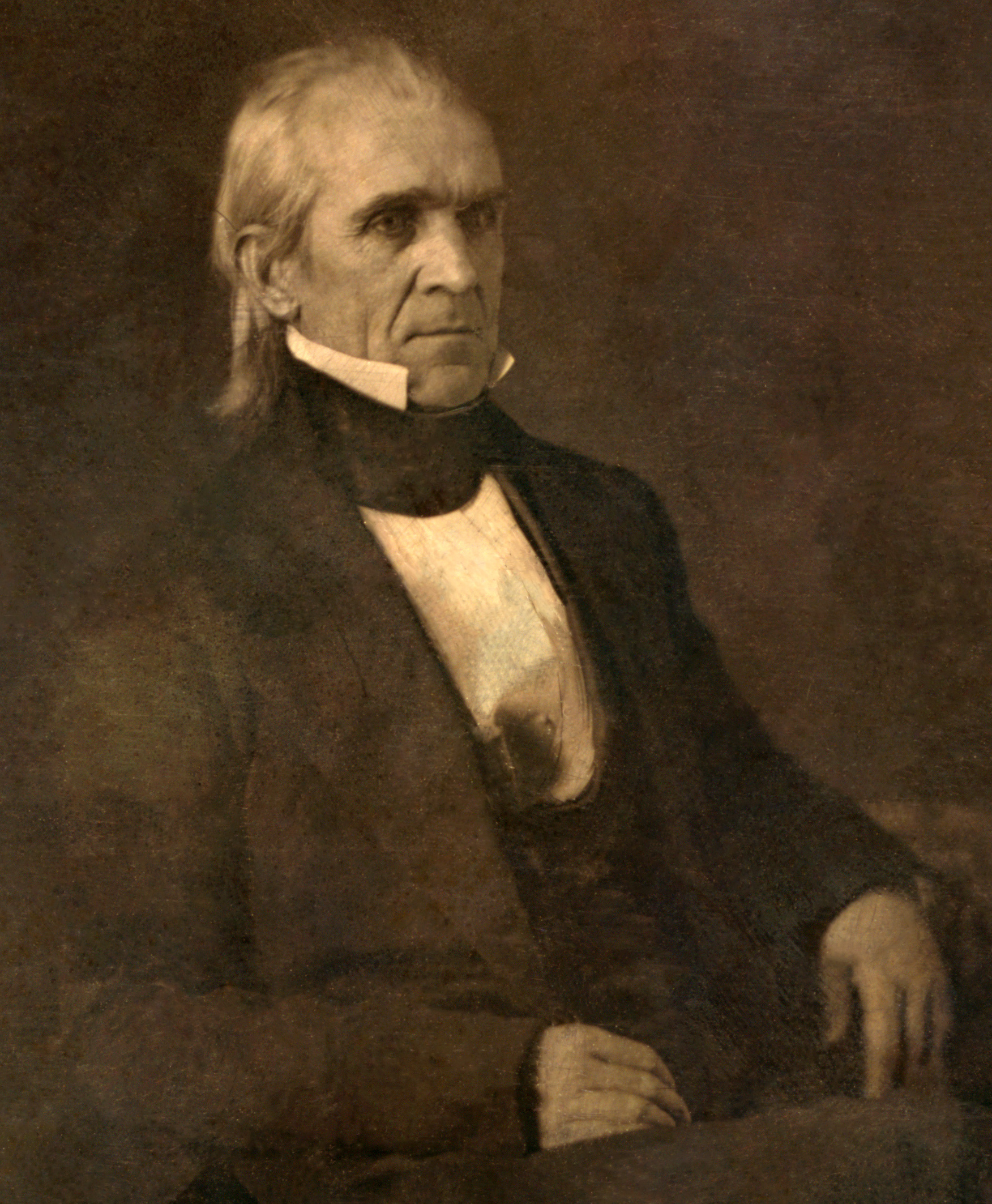
11th president of the United States James K. Polk (A.B. 1818)

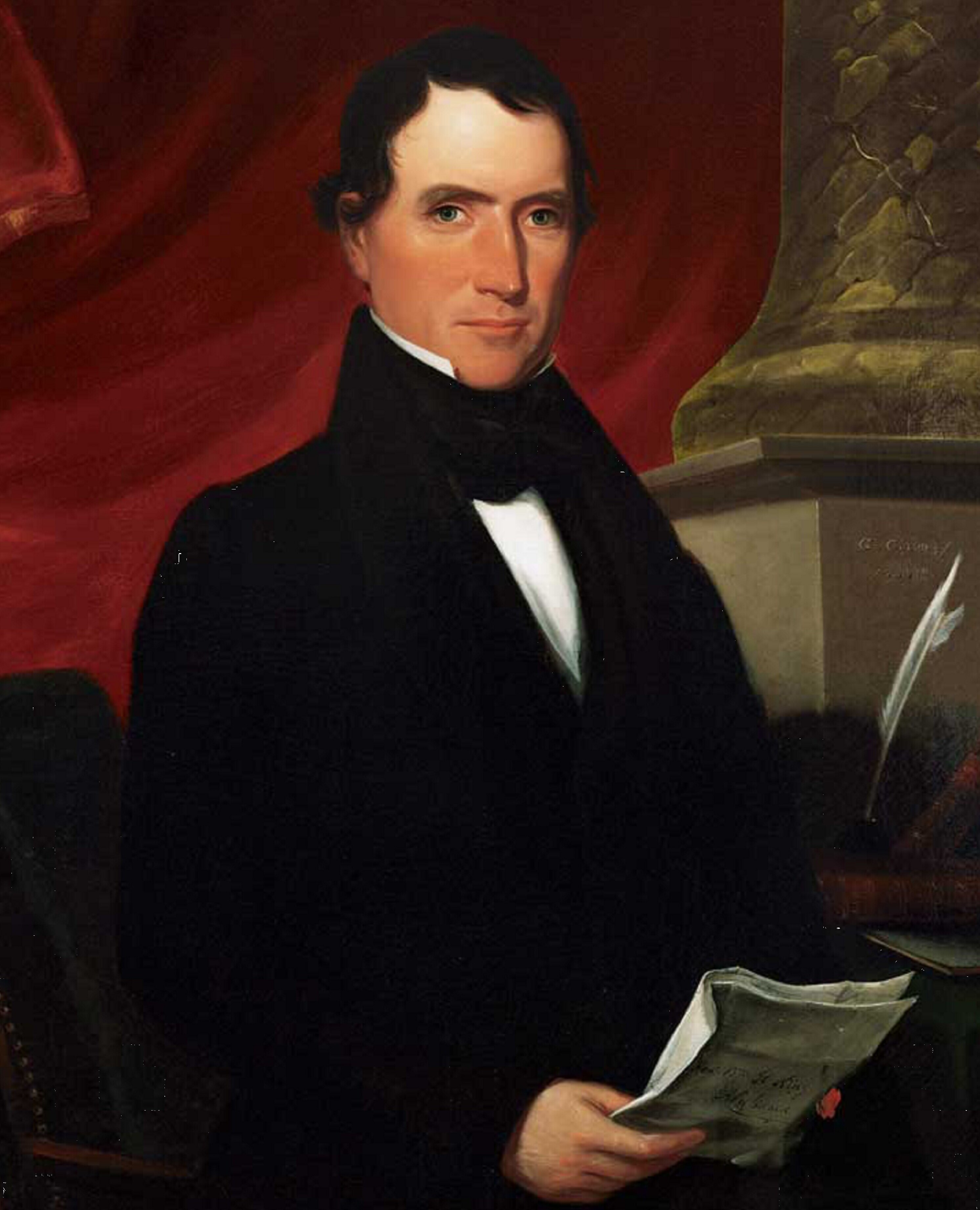
13th vice president of the United States William R. King (B.A. 1803)

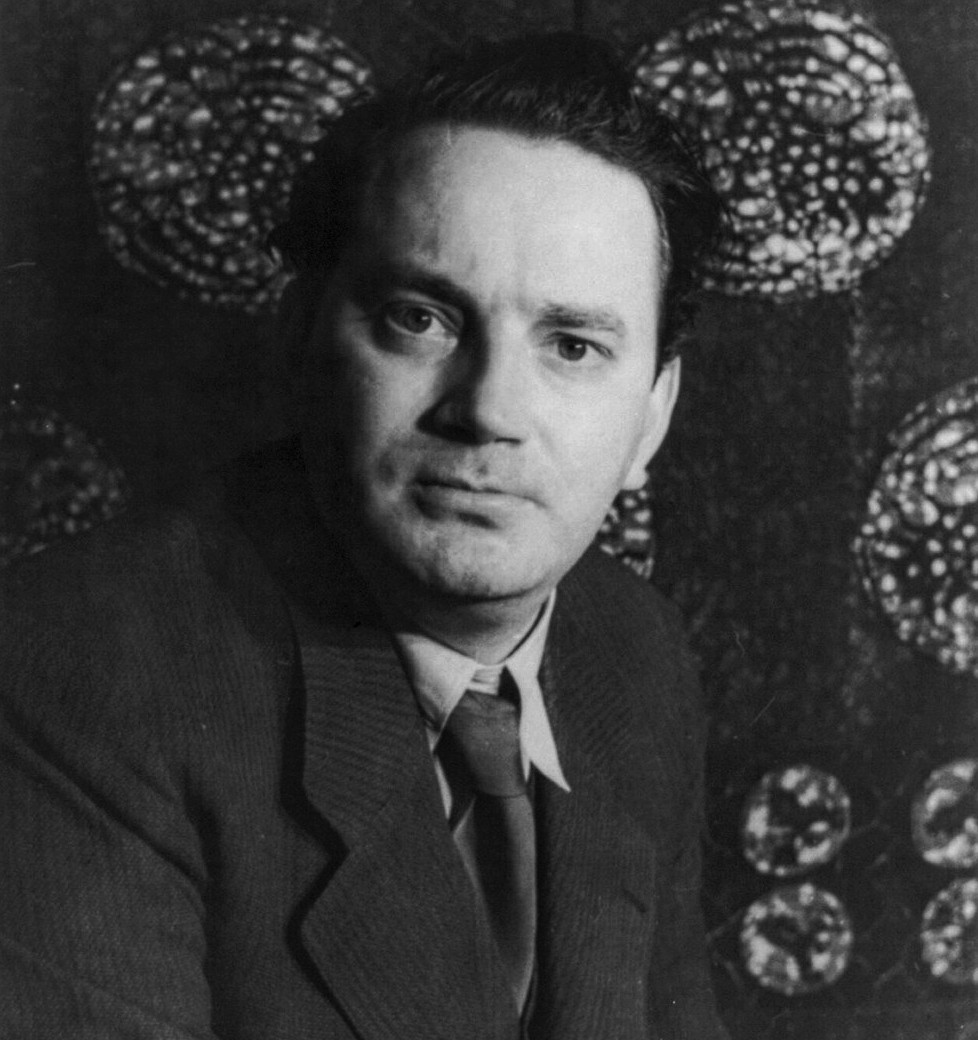
Author and novelist Thomas Wolfe (B.A. 1920)

Actor Andy Griffith (BMus 1949)

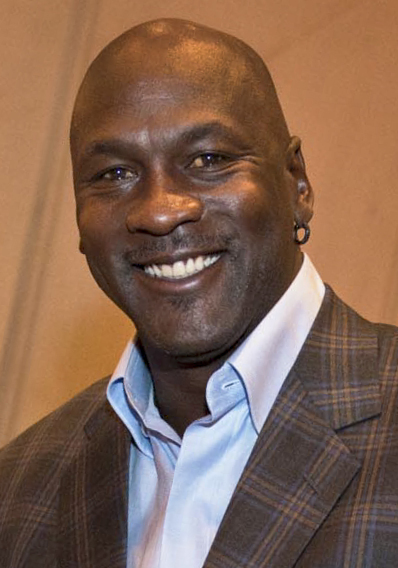
fourteen-time NBA All-Star, six-time NBA Champion, 5-time NBA MVP, Naismith Basketball Hall of Fame member Michael Jordan (B.A. 1986)

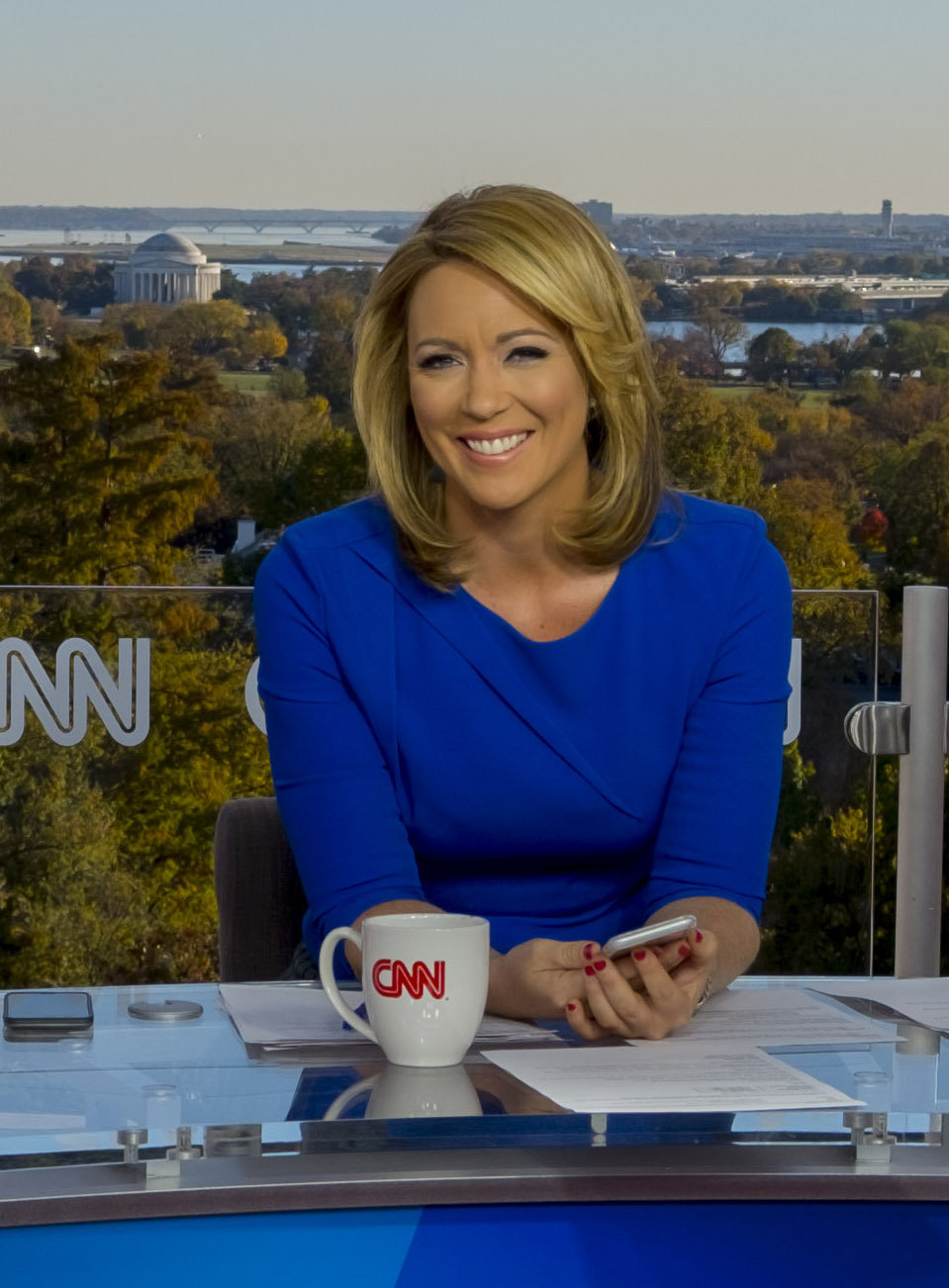
Journalist and author Brooke Baldwin (B.A. 2001)

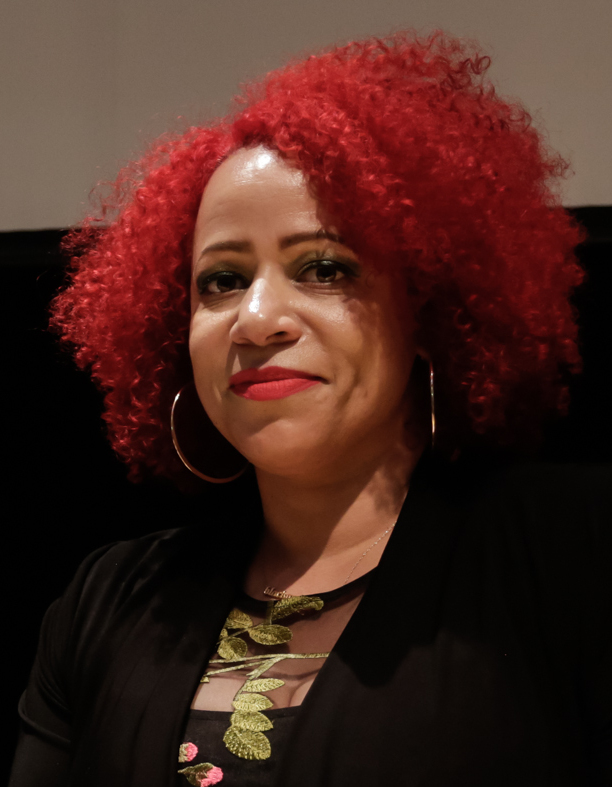
Pulitzer Prize–winning journalist Nikole Hannah-Jones (M.A. 2003)

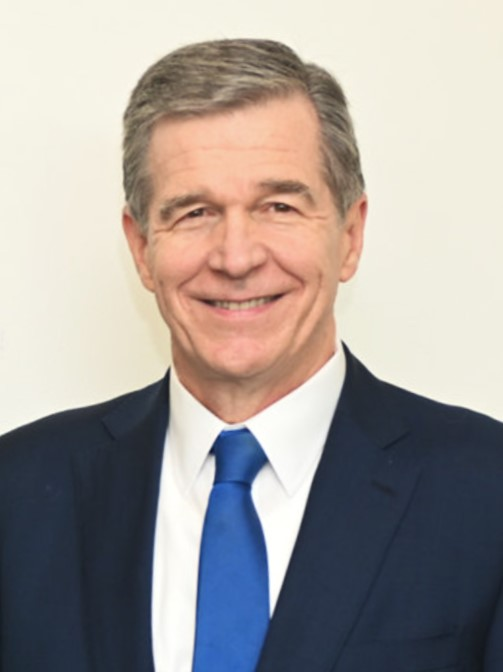
75th governor of North Carolina Roy Cooper (B.A. 1979, J.D. 1982)

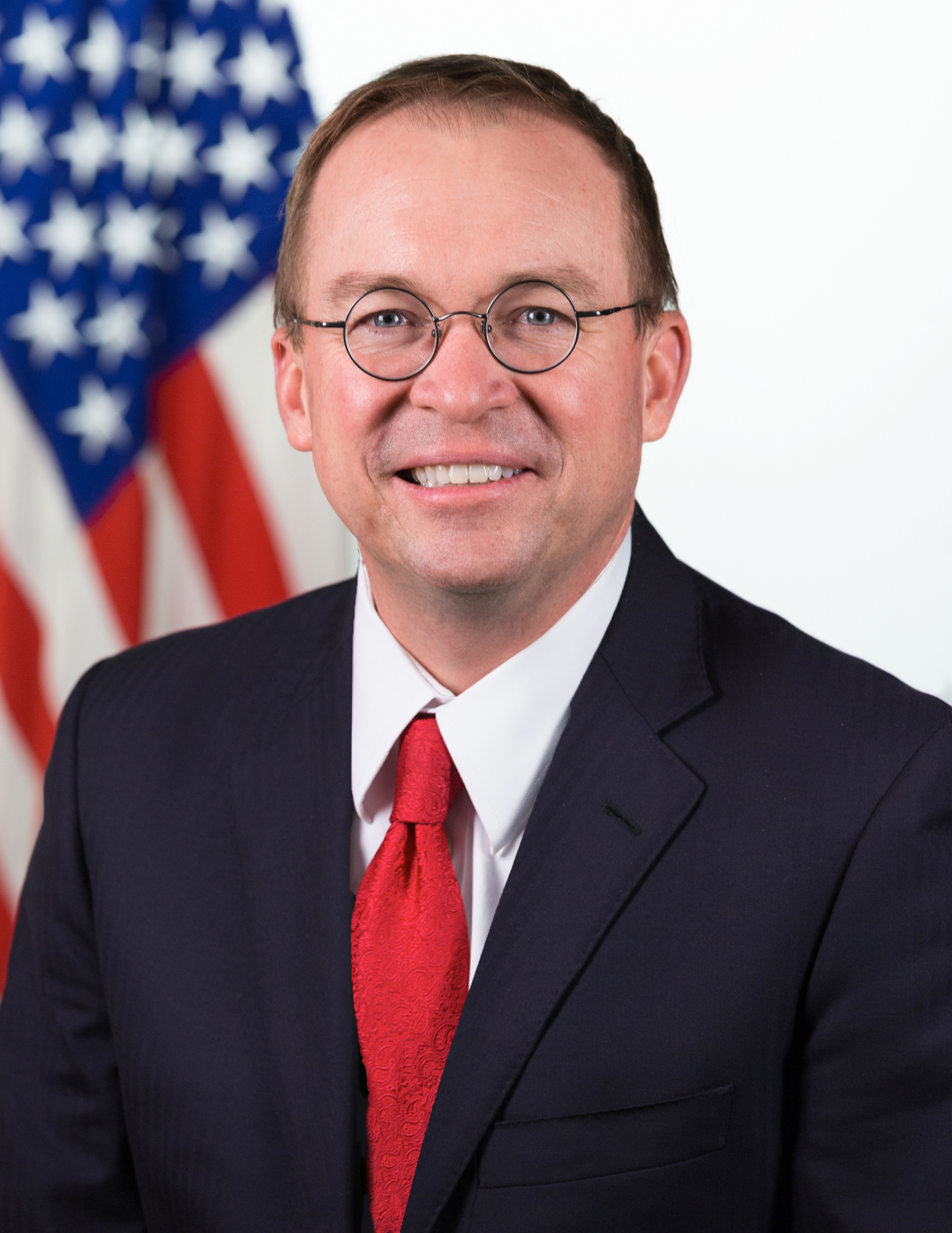
Former White House chief of staff and director of Office of Management and Budget Mick Mulvaney (J.D. 1992)

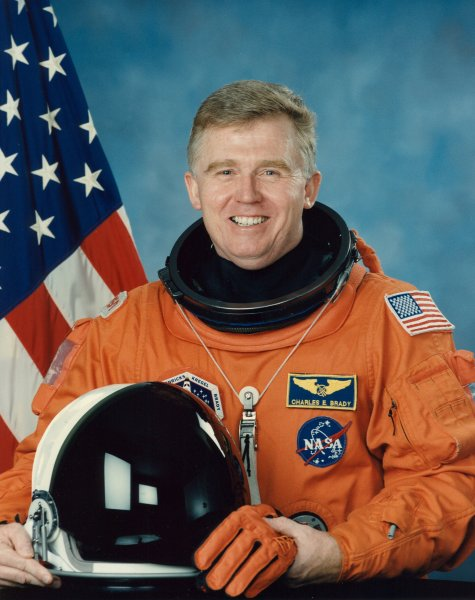
Astronaut Charles E. Brady Jr. (B.S. 1971)

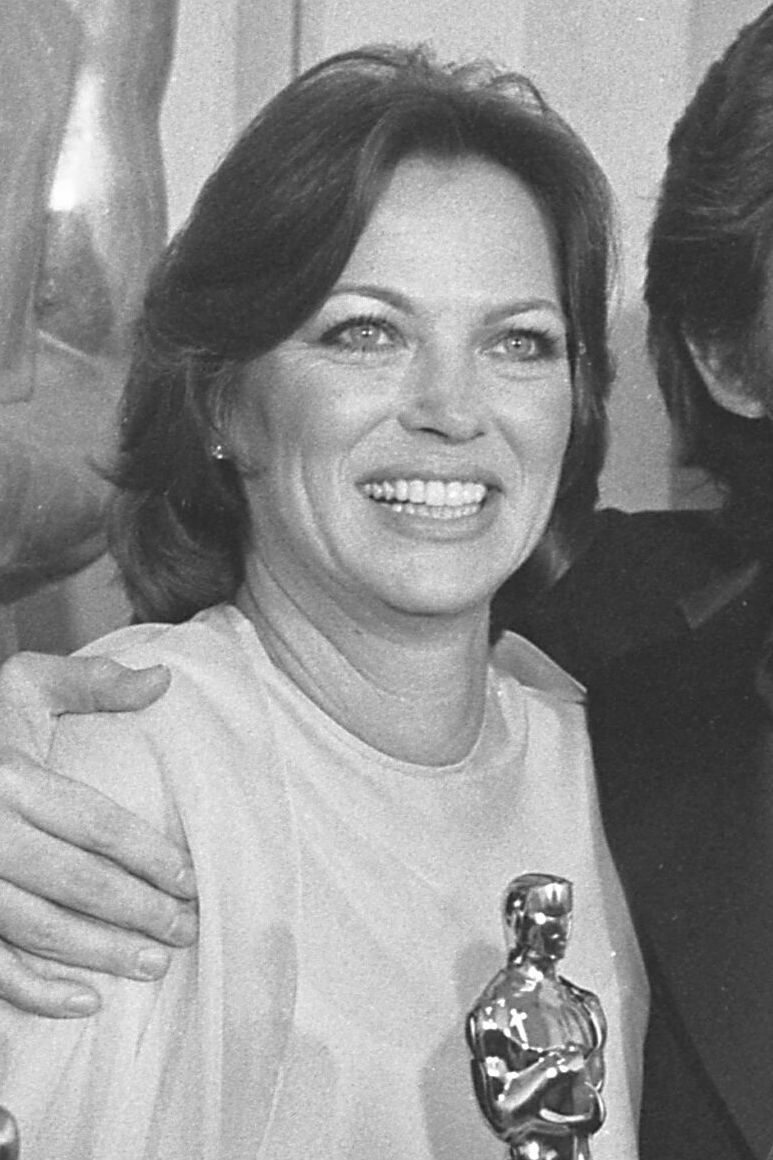
Golden Globe Award–winning actress Louise Fletcher (B.A. 1957)

== See also ==
- List of colleges and universities in North Carolina
- University Lake
- Carolina–Duke rivalry
- University of North Carolina
- Education in North Carolina
- UNC Health
- Research Triangle
