= I'm a Tar Heel Born =

College fight song

"I'm a Tar Heel Born" is the official fight song of the University of North Carolina at Chapel Hill. It originated in the late 1800s or early 1900s as an add-on to the school's alma mater, "Hark The Sound". It was sung at a 1903 baseball game against Brown University and, soon after, was adapted for the Brown University fight song “I’m a Brown Man Born”. It also inspired University of Rhode Island's fight song "We're Rhode Island Born", and the tag in the University of Oklahoma's fight song Boomer Sooner in 1906.

Today, the song is almost always played right after the singing of "Hark The Sound", including at more formal occasions such as convocation and commencement. It is played from the bell tower near the center of campus before home football and basketball games, and often after major victories. Bleacher Report ranked it the 24th best college football fight song.

== Lyrics ==
I'm a Tar Heel born, I'm a Tar Heel bred.
And when I die, I'm a Tar Heel dead.
So it's rah-rah, Car'lina-'lina!
Rah-rah, Car'lina-'lina!
Rah-rah, Car'lina-'lina!
Rah, rah, rah!

The final verse is rarely sung as "Rah, rah, rah!" in practice. It is usually replaced by "Go to Hell, Duke!" in reference to North Carolina's heated athletic rivalry with the Duke Blue Devils. Before the late 1980s, the cheer was more commonly shouted as "Go to hell, State!" due to the Tar Heels' traditional rivalry with the North Carolina State Wolfpack.

== See also ==
- "Here Comes Carolina"
