= William Starr Myers =

William Starr Myers (June 17, 1877 – January 27, 1956) was a Princeton University professor and historian who chronicled New Jersey and the GOP

Myers was the son of J. Norris Myers and Laura Virginia Starr of Baltimore, the family later moving to North Carolina. Myers married Margaret Barr on 8 June 1910.

Myers graduated from the University of North Carolina, class of 1897. Myers, the class of '97 poet, evidently felt great pride in his alma mater and was a prolific song writer who wrote several school-related songs which remain famous. "Hark the Sound" and "Tar Heel Born" are two of his most famous. At UNC Myers joined the fraternity Beta Theta Pi and was its president in his senior year. He was active in the Dialectic Society. After graduating from UNC cum laude, Myers went to graduate school at Johns Hopkins University where he studied political science, was elected to Phi Beta Kappa, and received his PhD in 1900.

Myers was an Editor of "Prominent Families of New Jersey - Volume 1" by Clearfield Publishing. While digitized volumes of this book do not contain a copyright or publishing date, some reviewers cite it was initially published in the 1940s.

In addition to Political Science, Myers studied journalism and while at UNC was editor of the yearbook, the Hellenian and editor of the school paper, the Tar Heel.

After Johns Hopkins, Myers became a "master" at a boys' school, the Gilman School in Baltimore.

Myers became assistant professor at Princeton University, 1906-1918, then professor from 1918 until his death.
