= Nash House =

Nash House may refer to:

- Nash House (409 East 6th Street, Little Rock, Arkansas)
- Nash House (601 Rock Street, Little Rock, Arkansas)
- Nash-Reid-Hill House, Jonesboro, Arkansas
- Fisher-Nash-Griggs House, Ottawa, Illinois
- Nash-McDonald House, Anchorage, Kentucky
- Dr. Nash House, Clay Village, Kentucky
- William M. Nash House, Cherryfield, Maine
- Charles W. Nash House, Flint, Michigan
- Rev. J. Edward Nash Sr. House, Buffalo, New York
- Arthur C. and Mary S.A. Nash House, Chapel Hill, North Carolina
- Hazel-Nash House, Hillsborough, North Carolina
- Nash-Hooper House, Hillsborough, North Carolina
- Nash-Swindler House, Fort Gibson, OK, listed on the NRHP in Oklahoma
- William R. Nash House, Houston, TX, listed on the NRHP in Texas
