= Progress Energy (disambiguation) =

Progress Energy is an American power generation and distribution company.

Progress Energy may also refer to:

- Progress Energy Center for the Performing Arts, the former name of the main venue for the performing arts in Raleigh, North Carolina
- Progress Energy Park, the former name of the downtown waterfront stadium in St. Petersburg, Florida
