= Playmakers Theatre =

- U.S. National Register of Historic Places
- U.S. National Historic Landmark
- U.S. Historic district – Contributing property
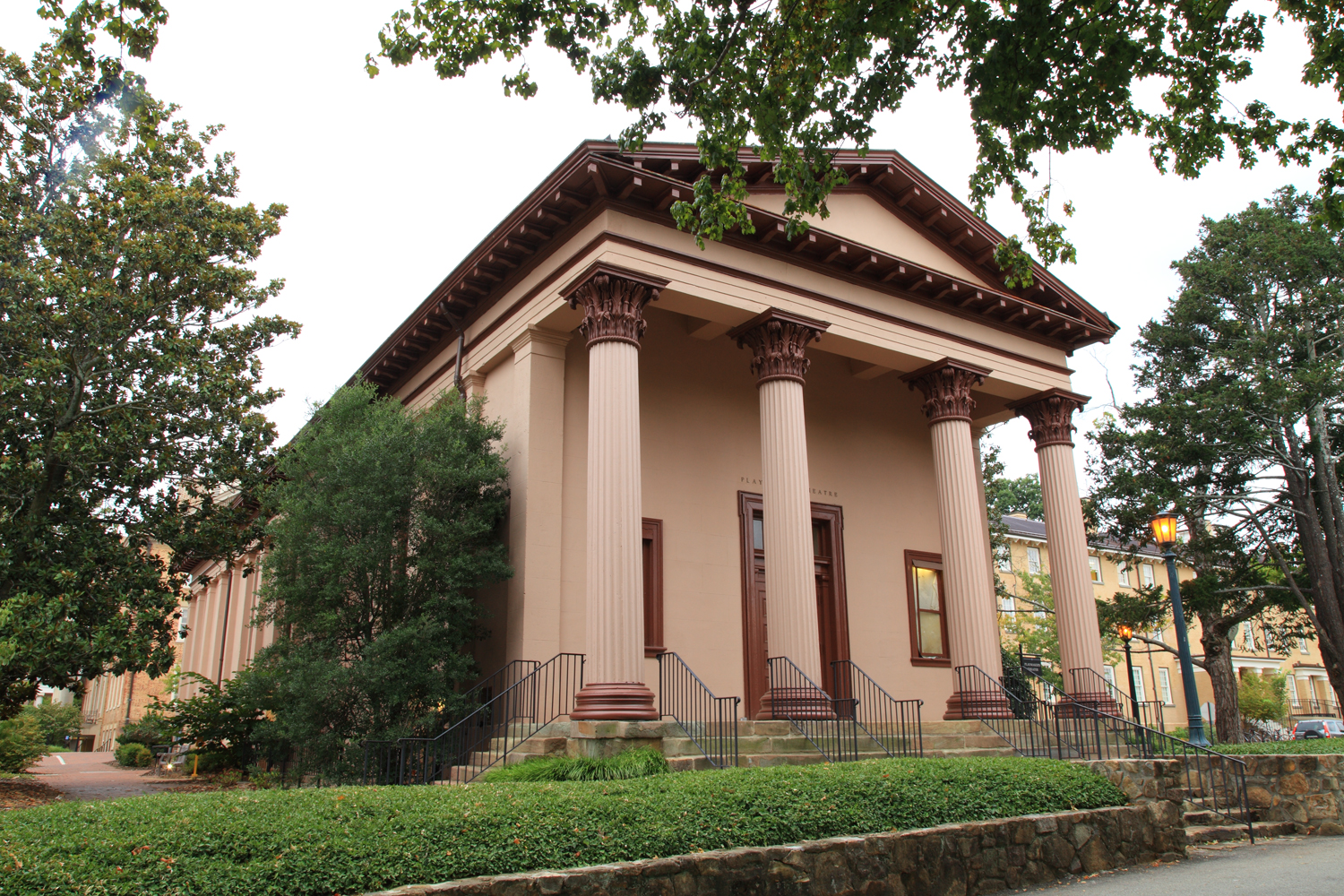
- Playmakers Theatre, a National Historic Landmark and former home to Carolina Playmakers theater group

- Location within North Carolina Location within the United States
- Location: Cameron Ave., Chapel Hill, North Carolina
- Coordinates: 35°54′43″N 79°3′2″W
- Area: less than one acre
- Built: 1850
- Architect: Davis, A.J.; Town & Davis
- Architectural style: Greek Revival
- Part of: Chapel Hill Historic District (ID71000604)
- NRHP reference No.: 71000605

Significant dates
- Added to NRHP: June 24, 1971
- Designated NHL: November 7, 1973
- Designated CP: December 16, 1971

The Playmakers Theatre, originally Smith Hall, is a historic academic building on the campus of the University of North Carolina at Chapel Hill. Built in 1850, it was designated a National Historic Landmark for its architecture, as an important example of Greek Revival architecture by Alexander Jackson Davis. It is now a secondary venue of the performing company, which is principally located at the Paul Green Theatre in the Joan H. Gillings Center for Dramatic Art.

== Description and history ==
Playmakers Theatre is located in the northern portion of the UNC campus, on the south side of East Cameron Avenue next to the College of Arts and Sciences, and across Cameron from Old East, also a National Historic Landmark. The building has the form of a Greek temple, built out brick with a stuccoed exterior. At its eastern end is a gabled portico, supported by fluted columns that have Corinthian capitals modified to include ears of corn and leaves of tobacco, two important North Carolina crops. The gable is fully pedimented, with modillioned eave and rake edge. The walls of the building have pilastered bays, the pilasters supporting a simple entablature.

Smith Hall was built in 1850, as part of a campus improvement plan begun in the 1830s. Andrew Jackson Davis had been retained to oversee alterations to Old East and Old West, and develop an overall plan for the campus. Its original purposes was as a social venue. After also being used as a laboratory, bath house, and law school, it became a theater in 1923. The theatre was the home of the Carolina Playmakers, although as their successor, PlayMakers Repertory Company uses the Paul Green Theatre in the Joan H. Gillings Center for Dramatic Art as their primary venue.

== See also ==
- National Register of Historic Places listings in Orange County, North Carolina
- List of National Historic Landmarks in North Carolina
