= Ray Dooley =

Ray Dooley may refer to:

- Ray Dooley (actor) (born 1952), American stage and screen actor
- Ray Dooley (actress) (1896–1984), American vaudeville comedian
