= Chapel of the Cross (Chapel Hill, North Carolina) =

Historic church in North Carolina, United States

- U.S. National Register of Historic Places
- U.S. Historic district – Contributing property
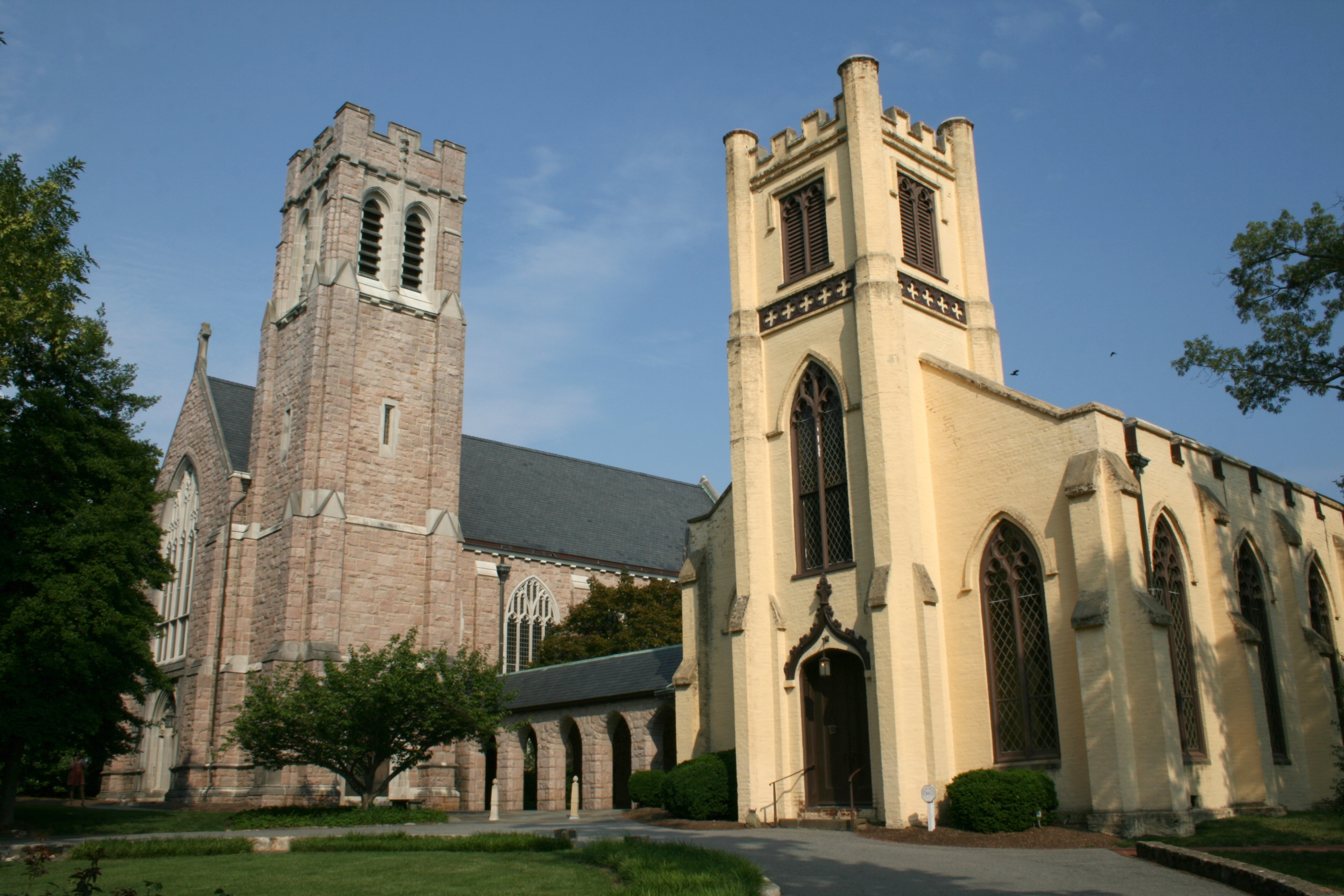

- Location within North Carolina Location within the United States
- Location: 304 E. Franklin St., Chapel Hill, North Carolina
- Coordinates: 35°54′58″N 79°2′39″W
- Area: 1.5 acres (0.61 ha)
- Built: 1843-1848
- Architect: Walter, Thomas U.; Hobart B. Upjohn
- Architectural style: Gothic Revival
- NRHP reference No.: 72000980
- Added to NRHP: February 1, 1972

Chapel of the Cross is a parish of the Episcopal Church of the United States in Chapel Hill in the Diocese of North Carolina. It is the spiritual home to more than 1,600 communicants, including numerous students studying at the University of North Carolina at Chapel Hill.

== History ==
The Church of England was established in Chapel Hill in 1752 when a chapel of ease was built at an important hilltop crossroads in the southern part of Orange County to spare remote parishioners a journey to the church in Hillsborough. The small log building, known as New Hope Chapel, stood where the Carolina Inn is now but disappeared during the American Revolution. The settlement on New Hope Chapel Hill remained, the University of North Carolina was founded in 1795, and traveling clergy visited, but a permanent Episcopal congregation did not form again for half a century.

In May 1842, the Rev. William Mercer Green, a Professor of Belles Lettres at the University of North Carolina, presided over the organization of the Church of the Atonement, an Episcopal parish with fifteen communicants and no church building.

The growing congregation worshiped in one another's homes for five years as work on their little church went slowly, using handmade bricks fired in kilns on the Rev. Green's property. On October 19, 1848, Bishop Levi Silliman Ives consecrated the new church – complete with a wooden gallery for slaves – “The Chapel of the Holy Cross.” He accurately described the scale of the building by calling it a chapel, but declared, “We’ll name it for the deed and not the doctrine.” The parish had twenty-two communicants, five of whom were University students. The Gothic Revival style church was designed by architect Thomas U. Walter. The red brick church has a gable roof and features a crenellated entrance tower and lancet windows. The original church was listed on the National Register of Historic Places in 1972. It is located in the Chapel Hill Historic District.

By 1921 the parish had outgrown its first church. The Vestry, under the leadership of the Rev. Alfred Lawrence (rector 1921–1944) asked the distinguished church architect Hobart B. Upjohn to design a new building to be connected to “the old chapel” by a cloister. Major funding for the church was provided by a gift from the Durham mill owner and philanthropist William A. Erwin in memory of his grandfather, William Rainey Holt, a classmate of William Mercer Green in the class of 1818. The new building was consecrated on May 14, 1925.

The Chapel of the Cross has not been untouched by the moral and political turmoil of the twentieth century. The Rev. David Yates (rector 1945–1959) insisted that a Christian community was obligated to pray for the enemy and respect the rights of conscientious objectors, however difficult, during World War II. He ensured that black people were welcomed in the parish, long before most Southern institutions were integrated. Later, on February 13, 1977, the Rev. Dr. Pauli Murray, the first black woman ordained to the Episcopal priesthood, celebrated her first Eucharist and also became the first woman to celebrate the Eucharist at The Chapel of the Cross. She presided in the same chapel where her grandmother, Cornelia, a slave child belonging to Mary Ruffin Smith, was baptized in 1854.

The Rev. Peter James Lee (rector 1971–1984) introduced the use of the 1979 Book of Common Prayer and opened the pulpit and altar to women priests. In 1980, extensive renovation and restoration of parish buildings were completed. Mr. Lee was consecrated Bishop Coadjutor of the Episcopal Diocese of Virginia on May 19, 1984, and became Bishop of Virginia the next year.

On July 1, 1985, the Rev. Stephen J. Elkins-Williams, then Associate for Parish Ministry, became the twenty-seventh rector of The Chapel of the Cross. His tenure has been marked by an intentional focus on expanding the outreach ministry of the parish and its role in the community as exemplified in the development of a Sister Parish Covenant with St. Paul African Methodist Episcopal Church, a student-parish Habitat for Humanity partnership, continued strong campus ministry, and increased outreach funding. Christian Education and Youth Ministry programs have been expanded, and a more intentional Elder Ministry is in the process of development. The staff has been increased to keep up with expanding ministry, including the Assistant for Pastoral Ministry, full-time Organist-Choirmaster and Christian Education Director positions, and increased administrative and maintenance support.

The thirtieth anniversary of the Reverend Pauli Murray's first Eucharist was commemorated in the chapel on February 8, 2007, in a service celebrated by the Most Reverend Katharine Jefferts Schori, the Presiding Bishop of the Episcopal Church.

A new parish house, designed by Washington architects Hartman-Cox, was opened in October 2014 providing the Great Hall, classrooms, preschool, and youth and music facilities.

The Rev. Elkins-Williams retired on October 11, 2015.

The Rev. Elizabeth Marie Melchionna became Rector on August 1, 2016

The history of the Chapel of the Cross has been marked by steady growth. The Church of the Holy Family, the second Episcopal church in Chapel Hill, was commissioned in 1952. The Church of the Advocate, an Episcopal mission of Chapel of the Cross, Holy Family and St. Matthews (Hillsborough), was founded in 2003.

== Today ==
=== Mission statement ===
Its mission statement is as follows:
The Chapel of the Cross welcomes you with an open door. We are:

Called by tradition and mission to minister in the heart of the University and local community
Committed to the sacramental worship of God, engaging the richness and beauty of Anglican liturgy and music
Growing as disciples of Jesus through preaching, teaching, service, and fellowship
Bringing Gospel witness to the world.

=== Information ===
The Chapel of the Cross holds four services every Sunday during the Fall, Winter and Spring. The Chapel of the Cross holds three services every Sunday during the Summer. Services are also held at assisted living facilities in the Chapel Hill area.

The Chapel of the Cross has a strong choral tradition with choirs. The Chapel of the Cross serves students at the University of North Carolina at Chapel Hill and has a strong college ministry program called the Episcopal Campus Ministry, or "ECM." The church also has a strong youth program called the Episcopal Youth Community for sixth through twelfth graders.

As a university church, there is also a strong focus on adult and youth education. Sunday School is held every week with a variety of other programs and discussion groups on topics ranging from the death penalty to the environment. Along with education, other programs are offered to assist parishioners with their spiritual development and prayer life.

Troop 9 of the Boy Scouts of America began meeting at The Chapel of the Cross in 1937 obtained its charter with The Chapel of the Cross in 1946. The origins of Troop 9 predate the incorporation of the Boy Scouts of America. The Troop originated on the UNC campus in 1910 as a Scout Unit of the YMCA. Along with other YMCA Scout Units, the Troop was transferred into the BSA under an agreement with the BSA's founder and the YMCA in 1912. Troop 9 celebrated its 100th birthday in 2010, at the same time the Boy Scouts of America celebrated their 100th anniversary of incorporation in the United States.

With a focus on the Millennium Development Goals developed by the United Nations, Chapel of the Cross engages in a wide variety of outreach work in the community of Chapel Hill, the United States and the world. International outreach efforts have focused on two countries, South Africa and Honduras. Another major effort undertaken by the Chapel of the Cross in the area of outreach is the annual Attic, Basement and Closet Sale (ABC Sale), which raises thousands of dollars for charities that apply for grants. In addition, the church's facilities are used by a wide variety of organizations from the University of North Carolina and the community, including Alcoholics Anonymous, Narcotics Anonymous, and English as a Second Language (ESL) classes. A special service is held monthly for individuals in the community with developmental disabilities.

There are currently three full-time clergy at Chapel of the Cross. The main governing body of the Chapel of the Cross is the vestry, which is composed of twelve lay people elected from the congregation for three-year terms. Four vestry members are elected annually.

Chapel of the Cross is active in the governance of the Episcopal Diocese of North Carolina, the national Episcopal Church, and the international Anglican Communion as a whole.

== Notable names with connections to Chapel of the Cross ==
- The Rt. Rev. Robert Duncan (First Archbishop and Primate of the Anglican Church in North America) – served as the Associate for Campus Ministry
- The Rt. Rev. John Spong (Bishop of Newark) – served as a student resident
- The Rev. Pauli Murray – celebrated her first Eucharist at Chapel of the Cross
- State Senator Eleanor Kinnaird – parishioner of Chapel of the Cross
- Chancellor Emeritus of UNC-Chapel Hill James Moeser – parishioner of Chapel of the Cross
