= Sherwood-Jayne House =

Historic house in New York, United States

- U.S. National Register of Historic Places
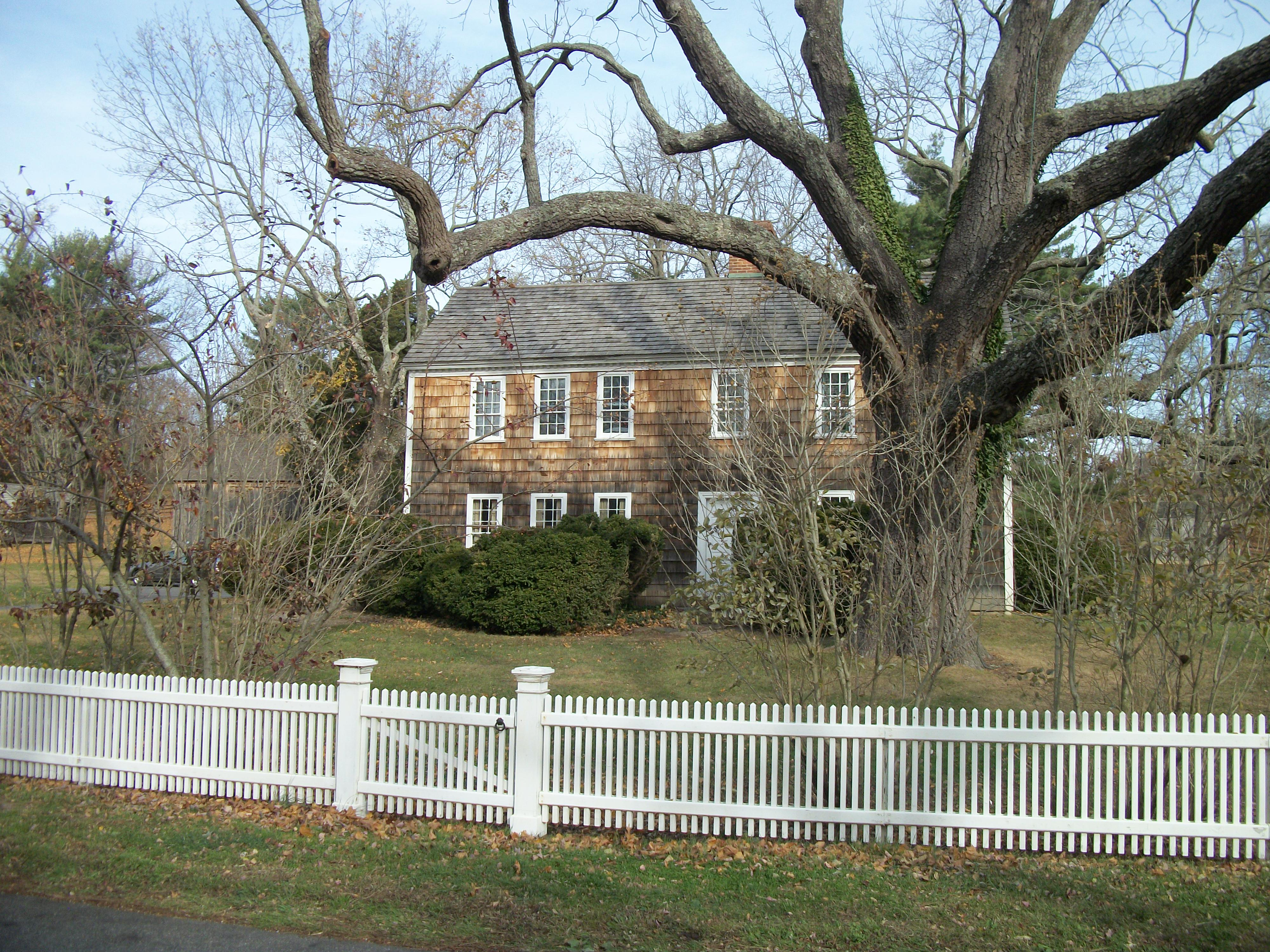
- The Sherwood-Jayne House as seen from Old Post Road in East Setauket, November 15, 2013.

- Location within New York Location within the United States
- Location: 55 Old Post Rd., East Setauket, New York
- Coordinates: 40°56′21.36″N 73°5′19.63″W
- Area: 2.07 acres (0.84 ha)
- Built: 1730
- Architectural style: Saltbox
- NRHP reference No.: 09000969
- Added to NRHP: February 26, 2009

Sherwood-Jayne House is a historic home and related buildings located at East Setauket in Suffolk County, New York. The property encompasses a two-story dwelling, as well as five accessory buildings, mature planting, split-rail and picket fences, and other landscape features. The construction dates of the house spans from about 1730 to 1940. It is a two-story, six-bay saltbox form dwelling with a two-story rear extension that forms an L-shaped plan. The five accessory structures are a large bar, carriage house, corn crib, prive, and pump house.

A north addition to the house was designed by architect Arthur C. Nash.

It was added to the National Register of Historic Places in 2009.

The house is now owned by the Society for the Preservation of Long Island Antiquities. It has been furnished with period antiques and is open for visits seasonally by appointment.
