= Old Well =

Landmark of University of North Carolina at Chapel Hill

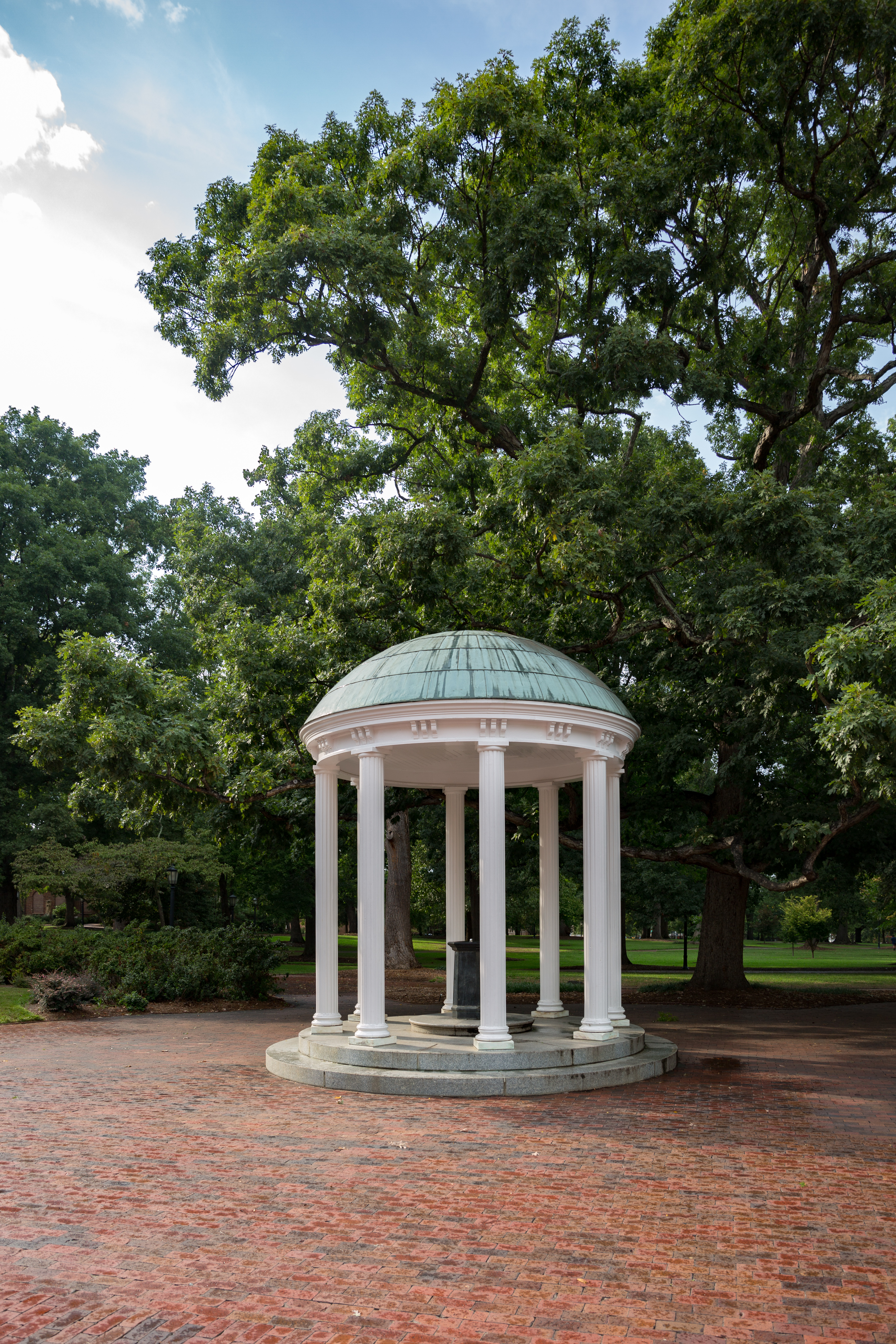
- The Old Well
- Interactive map of Old Well
- Location: University of North Carolina at Chapel Hill
- Coordinates: 35°54′43.4″N 79°3′4.5″W
- Built: 1897
- Website: The Old Well

The Old Well is a small, neoclassical cyclostyle on the University of North Carolina at Chapel Hill campus at the southern end of McCorkle Place. The current decorative form of the Old Well was modeled after the Temple of Love in the Gardens of Versailles and was completed in 1897. It was designed by the university registrar Eugene Lewis Harris (1856-1901), an artist and 1881 graduate of the institution, who served as registrar from 1894 to 1901. It is the most enduring symbol of UNC.

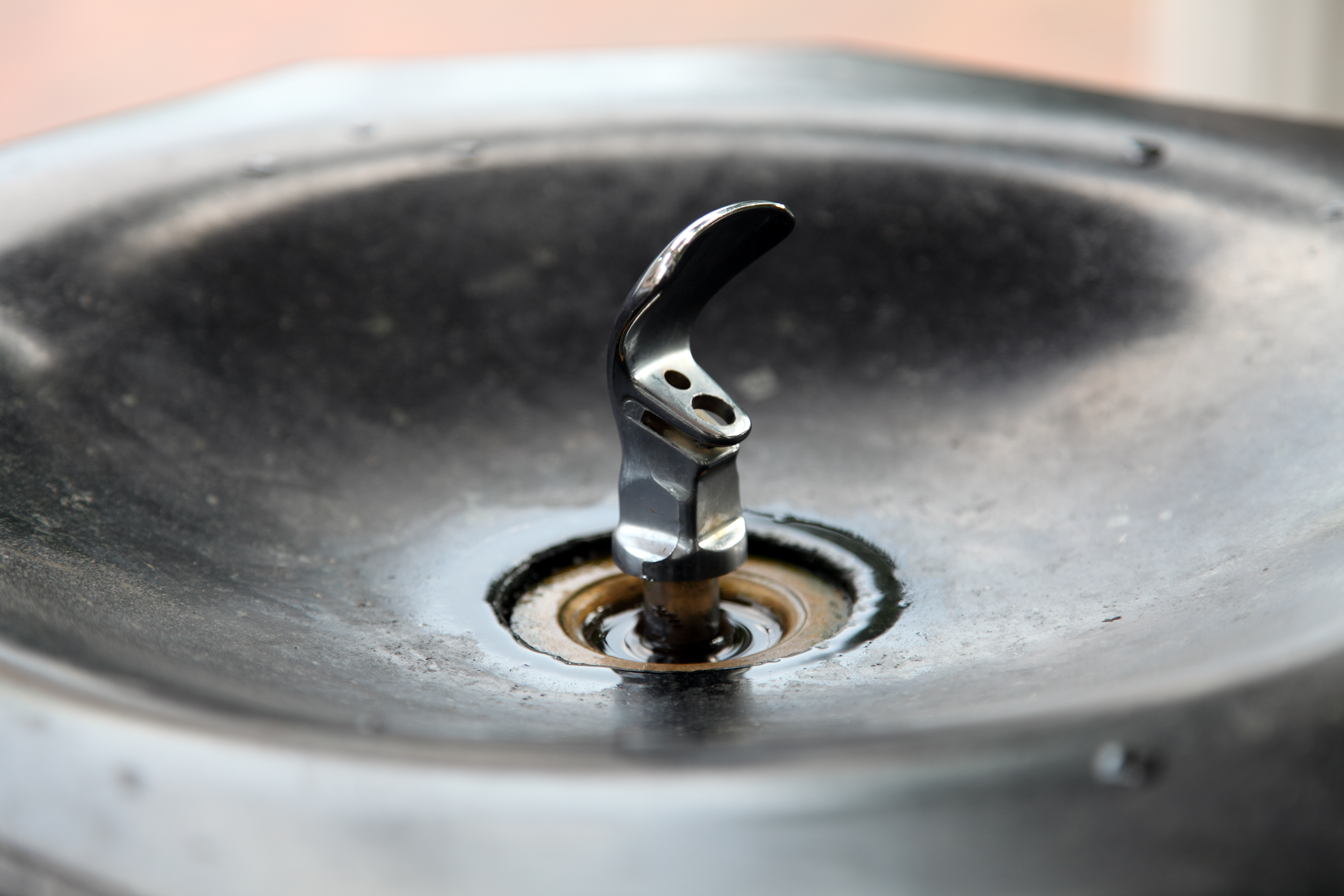
The Old Well drinking fountain.

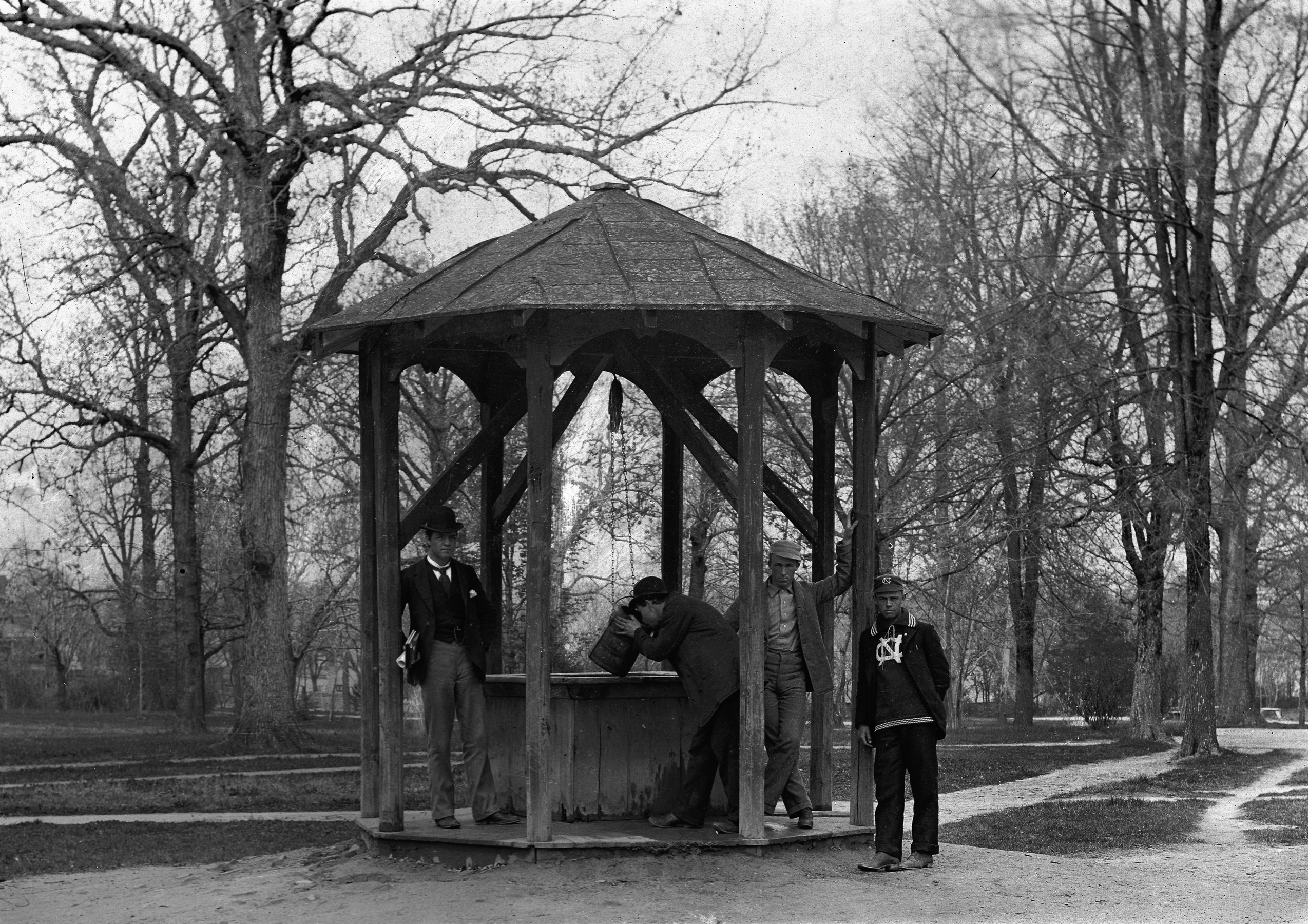
The Old Well, here in a photo from 1892, served as the campus's sole water source for many years.

The Old Well is located between Old East and Old West residence halls. For many years, it served as the sole water supply for the university. In 1897, the original well was replaced and given its present signature structure by university president Edwin A. Alderman. In 1954, the university built benches, brick walls, and planted various flower beds and trees around the Old Well.

Passers-by can drink from a marble water fountain supplying city water that sits in the center of the Old Well. Campus tradition dictates that a drink from the Old Well on the first day of classes will bring good luck (or straight As).

The Old Well is recognized as a National Landmark for Outstanding Landscape Architecture by the American Society of Landscape Architects. The Old Well is also used on the official stamp of all apparel licensed by the university. Because of its status as a symbol of the university, it is the target of vandals around the time of Carolina – State sporting events.

In Kinston, North Carolina, there is a replica of the Old Well, created to honor UNC alumnus Harvey Beech. Beech was one of the first African-Americans to attend the University of North Carolina School of Law.

== Old Well Walk ==
On game days from the 2001–2012 football seasons, the North Carolina Tar Heels football team traveled from the team hotel and was dropped off in the center of campus, which is the Old Well. From there, the team walked from the Old Well through Tar Heel Town and into the Kenan Football Stadium. This walk was usually packed with fans hoping to see their favorite players. The Old Well walk started approximately two and a half hours prior to kickoff. Tar Heels head coach Bill Belichick revived the tradition heading into the 2025 season, with Belichick and the team completing the walk just before the season opener on 1 September 2025.
