= Arthur C. and Mary S.A. Nash House =

Historic house in North Carolina, United States

- U.S. National Register of Historic Places
- U.S. Historic district – Contributing property
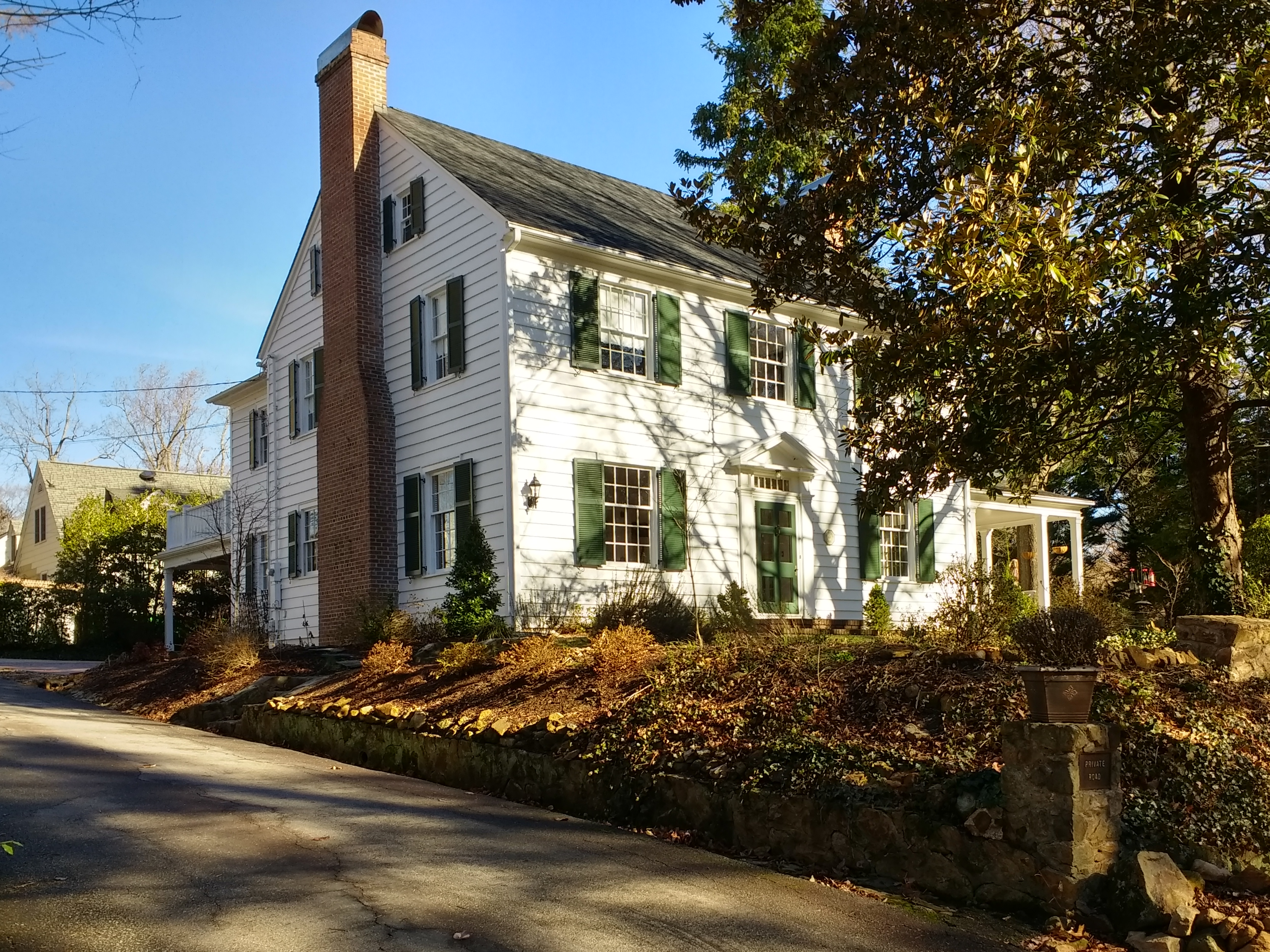

- Location within North Carolina Location within the United States
- Location: 124 South Boundary St. Chapel Hill, North Carolina, U.S.
- Coordinates: 35°54′50″N 79°02′43″W
- Area: 0.55 acres (0.22 ha)
- Built: 1926
- Architectural style: Colonial Revival
- Part of: Chapel Hill Historic District
- NRHP reference No.: 100001633
- Added to NRHP: October 26, 2017

The Arthur C. and Mary S.A. Nash House is a historic home in Chapel Hill, North Carolina, located at 124 South Boundary Street.

It is a privately owned single dwelling building in the Colonial Revival style and made of weatherboard, asphalt, and brick. Designed in 1926 by architect Arthur C. Nash, the 2 1/2-story house was originally listed as 513 Cameron Avenue and later 513 Boundary Street until it was changed to its current address in the 1980s.

The house sits on a rectangular lot, 0.55 acres (0.22 ha), in the Battle Estate Development near the University of North Carolina at Chapel Hill. It was renovated in the 1950s and again around 1983 before being rehabilitated in 2016 using Nash's blueprints.

It was listed on the National Register of Historic Places on October 26, 2017 as a contributing building in the Chapel Hill Historic District created 1973.

== See also ==
- National Register of Historic Places listings in Orange County, North Carolina
