= PlayMakers Repertory Company =

North Carolina theatre company

- Formation: 1976
- Type: Theatre group
- Location: Center for Dramatic Art, 150 Country Club Road, Chapel Hill, NC 27599
- Website: http://www.playmakersrep.org/

PlayMakers Repertory Company is the professional theater company in residence at the University of North Carolina at Chapel Hill. PlayMakers Repertory Company is the successor of the Carolina Playmakers and is named after the Historic Playmakers Theatre. PlayMakers was founded in 1976 and is affiliated with the Dramatic and performing arts at the University of North Carolina at Chapel Hill. The company consists of residents, guest artists, professional staff and graduate students in the Department for Dramatic Arts at UNC and produces seasons of six main stage productions of contemporary and classical works that run from September to April. PlayMakers Repertory Company has a second stage series, PRC², that examines controversial social and political issues. The company has been acknowledged by the Drama League of New York and American Theatre magazine for being one of the top fifty regional theaters in the country. PlayMakers operates under agreements with the Actors' Equity Association, United Scenic Artists, and the Society of Stage Directors and Choreographers.

== History of the Carolina Playmakers ==
In 1918, Professor Frederick Koch came to the University of North Carolina at Chapel Hill to teach the university's first courses in playwriting. In that same year, he founded the Carolina Playmakers theater company to produce original plays. Koch and the Playmakers mainly produced what they considered to be "folk plays." Koch defined a folk play as based on "the legends, superstitions, customs, environmental differences, and the vernacular of the common people." He saw them as primarily "realistic and human," and chiefly concerned with "man's conflict with the forces of nature and his simple pleasure in being alive."

Working with folk plays encouraged Koch's students to write about the small communities and rural populations they were likely to be familiar with, and, as in the experience of Paul Green, to address the experiences of "marginalized populations of the South," such as black people and Native Americans.

The Carolina Playmakers began touring locally in 1920, then statewide the following year. In 1922, the first series of Carolina Folk Plays was published, which included five plays written and produced by the Playmakers. In 1925, Smith Hall, a building on campus previously used as a library and ballroom, was remodeled and dedicated as Playmakers Theatre for Playmakers performances.

A number of successful writers and actors honed their craft in the Carolina Playmakers. Novelist Thomas Wolfe wrote and acted in several plays as a UNC student – including taking the title role in The Return of Buck Gavin (which Wolfe himself wrote) in the Playmakers' first bill of plays on March 14 and 15, 1919. Betty Smith, who would later write A Tree Grows in Brooklyn from her home in Chapel Hill, first came to town in 1936 as part of the WPA Federal Theater Project, and wrote many plays for the company. In the late 1940s, Andy Griffith appeared in several Playmakers performances, including Gilbert and Sullivan's The Mikado and HMS Pinafore.

Other notable writers associated with the Carolina Playmakers include Paul Green, Josefina Niggli, Kermit Hunter, Margaret Bland, John Patric, and Jonathan W. Daniels.

== Venues ==
=== Historic Playmakers Theatre ===
The Historic Playmakers Theatre is a Greek Revival temple designed by New York architect Alexander Jackson Davis as a combined library and ballroom. When it was completed in 1851, it was named Smith Hall in honor of North Carolina Governor Benjamin Smith, who donated land to the university for the building. After use as a laboratory, bath house, and law school, it became a theater in 1925. The theater is the home of the Carolina Playmakers, although their successor, Playmakers Repertory Company, uses the Paul Green Theatre as its primary venue. It was added to the National Register of Historic Places in 1971 and was designated a National Historic Landmark in 1973. The Historic Playmakers Theatre is also one of the oldest buildings dedicated to the arts of the university. The theatre is located next to South Building on East Cameron Avenue on the campus of the University of North Carolina at Chapel Hill.

=== Paul Green Theatre ===
The Paul Green Theatre was completed in 1976. It seats 500. Located in the Center for Dramatic Arts on the campus of the University of North Carolina at Chapel Hill, this building is the primary venue of PlayMakers Repertory Company. The Paul Green Theatre stages plays by professional actors, directors, and artists from across the nation.

=== Kenan Theatre ===
The Elizabeth Price Kenan Theatre was built in 1999 as an extension to the Paul Green Theatre. The Kenan Theatre seats between 120 and 265 depending on stage configuration and is considered a Black box theatre. It features the productions of PlayMakers Repertory Company's second stage series, PRC². It presents plays about controversial social and political issues.

The venue also hosts productions by undergraduates from the University of North Carolina at Chapel Hill.

== Selected artists ==
Directors Vivienne Benesch, Desdemona Chiang, Wendy C. Goldberg and Joseph Haj have worked at PlayMakers, as well as the actor Ray Dooley.

== See also ==
Dramatic and performing arts at the University of North Carolina at Chapel Hill
