= Raleigh Memorial Auditorium =

Performing arts venue in Raleigh, North Carolina

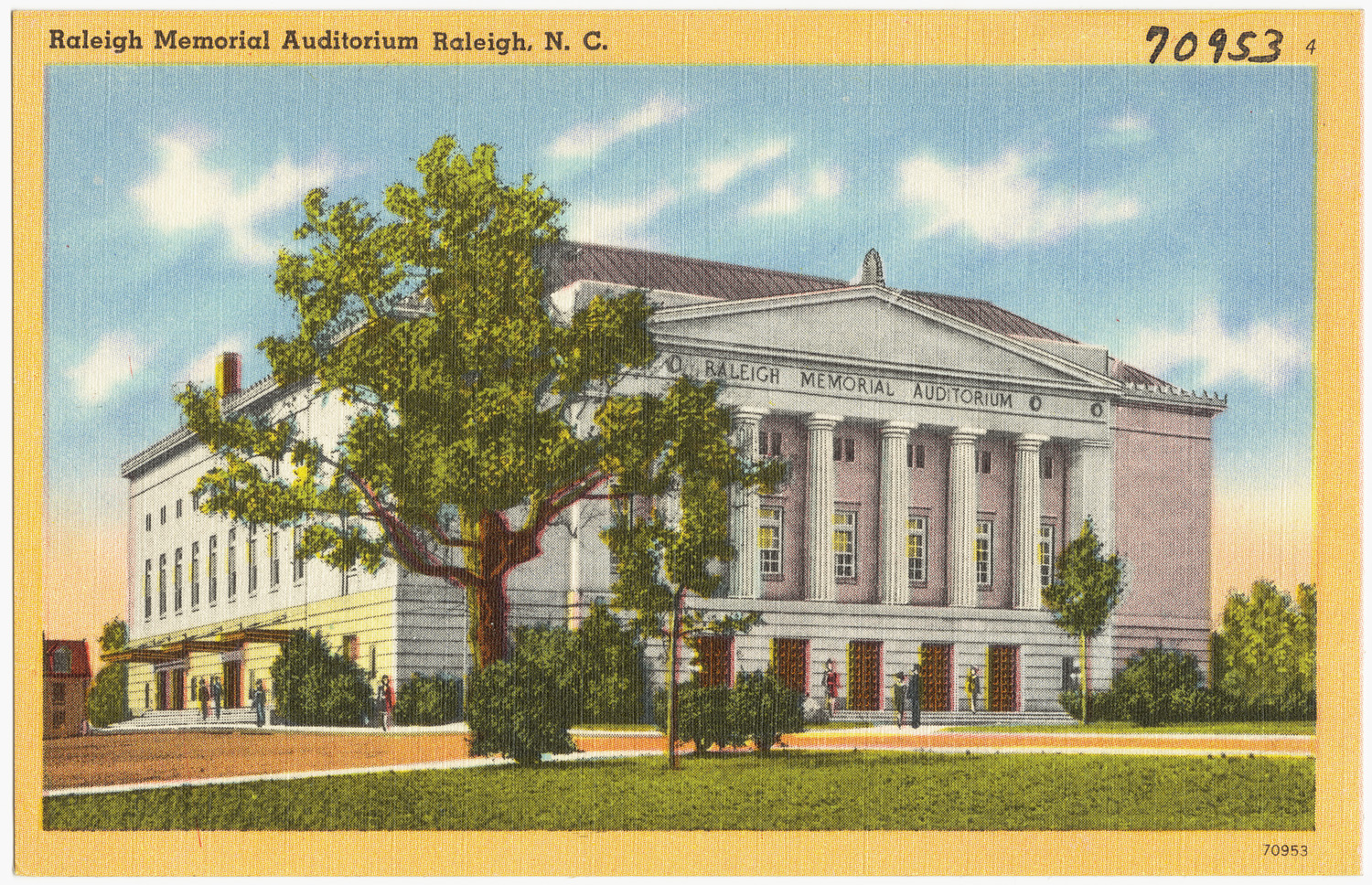
- Postcard of Raleigh Memorial Auditorium
- Interactive map of Raleigh Memorial Auditorium
- Address: 2 E South Street
- Location: Raleigh, North Carolina, U.S.
- Coordinates: 35.7713°N 78.6396°W
- Owner: City of Raleigh
- Operator: City of Raleigh
- Capacity: 2,277
- Type: Auditorium, Theater

Construction
- Groundbreaking: January 19, 1932
- Built: 1931–1932
- Opened: August 14, 1932
- Renovated: 1975, 1990, 2001, 2016
- Architects: Atwood and Weeks; Arthur C. Nash
- Structural engineer: Thomas C. Atwood
- General contractor: C. V. York

Tenants
- Carolina Ballet; North Carolina Opera; North Carolina Symphony; PineCone

Website
- www.martinmariettacenter.com

Raleigh Memorial Auditorium is a historic 2,277-seat performing arts venue located in downtown Raleigh, North Carolina. Opened in 1932, the massive Neoclassical and Beaux-Arts building serves as the architectural and cultural centerpiece of the Martin Marietta Center for the Performing Arts. Situated at the southern terminus of Fayetteville Street, it was intentionally designed to visually complement the North Carolina State Capitol, which sits at the street's northern end.

== History ==
=== Previous structures ===
The site of the auditorium has a long history tied to the political and civic development of Raleigh. In 1813, the North Carolina Governor's Palace was constructed on the lot, serving as the official residence for the state's executives until the end of the American Civil War. During the conflict, the palace was occupied by Union General William Tecumseh Sherman when his troops reached Raleigh in 1865.

The building was subsequently abandoned by governors and sold to the City of Raleigh in 1876, where it briefly operated as the Centennial School—the second public school in North Carolina. Eventually, the palace was demolished and replaced by the original City Auditorium. On October 24, 1930, City Auditorium was completely destroyed by a fire, leaving the capital without a primary municipal gathering space.

=== Construction and opening ===
Following the 1930 fire, local officials moved quickly to finance and construct a replacement, fearing Raleigh might lose its status as the state capital without a municipal complex. Funded with federal assistance during the Great Depression, the project was awarded to the architectural firm Atwood and Weeks, with Arthur C. Nash serving as a collaborating architect and C.V. York as the general contractor.

The cornerstone was laid on January 19, 1932. Dedicated as a memorial to the military personnel who died in World War I, Raleigh Memorial Auditorium officially opened to the public on August 14, 1932, celebrated with an all-night dance party. The North Carolina Symphony, which was founded the same year, made the new auditorium its first official home.

=== Renovations and expansion ===
The auditorium has undergone several significant renovations to modernize its theatrical capabilities while preserving its historic facade. In 1990, the city completed a $10.5 million renovation that added an outer glass lobby. To maintain the Neoclassical aesthetic, the original Doric columns were replicated on the new exterior, while the authentic 1932 columns were preserved within the space between the inner and outer lobbies.

In 2001, the venue was integrated into a larger performing arts complex originally known as the Progress Energy Center for the Performing Arts, later the Duke Energy Center, and now known as the Martin Marietta Center for the Performing Arts. The expansion, designed by Pearce Brinkley Cease + Lee, flanked Memorial Auditorium with the Meymandi Concert Hall and the A.J. Fletcher Opera Theater, effectively transitioning the building into a modern multiplex while retaining its historical prominence.

== Architecture ==
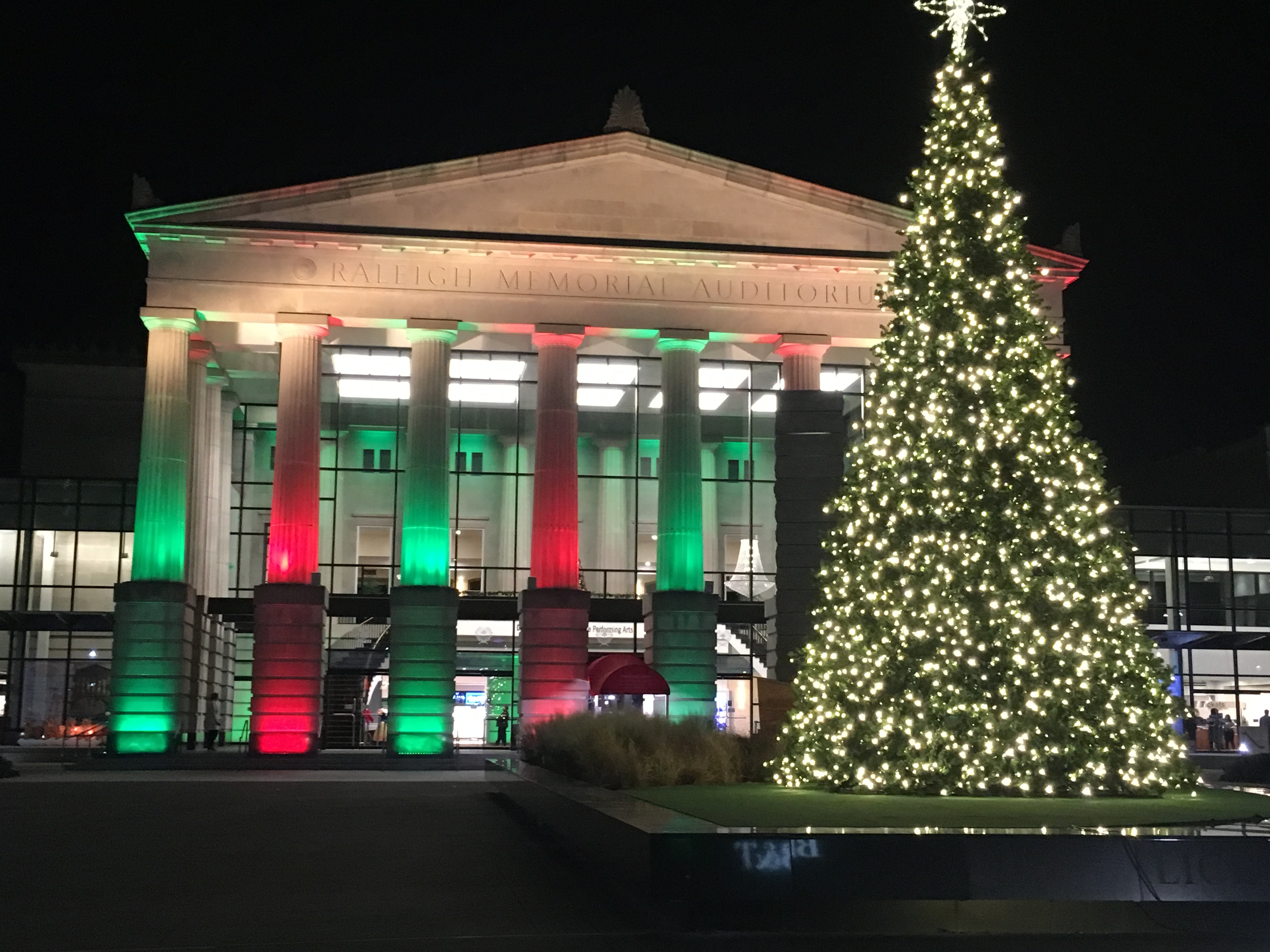
The auditorium in 2019

Raleigh Memorial Auditorium is heavily influenced by Neoclassical and Beaux-Arts architectural styles. The building's most prominent feature is its imposing Doric portico, which anchors the southern end of Fayetteville Street. Because Raleigh is a planned city, the street grid was designed with strict visual axes; the auditorium was intentionally constructed to provide a dignified southern terminus to the city's main street, mirroring the North Carolina State Capitol building facing it from the north.

== Usage and events ==
With a seating capacity of 2,277, the auditorium remains the largest venue within the Martin Marietta Center for the Performing Arts. It serves as the primary home for four resident companies; Carolina Ballet, North Carolina Opera, North Carolina Symphony, and PineCone, the Piedmont Council of Traditional Music.

Over its nearly century-long history, the stage has hosted a wide array of notable performers, including Frank Sinatra, Tony Bennett, Ray Charles, Prince, and Mikhail Baryshnikov and Broadway musicals, including The Phantom of the Opera, Les Misérables, and The Lion King.

Additionally, the venue hosts prominent regional civic and social events, including the traditional North Carolina Debutante Ball.

== See also ==
- List of concert halls
- National Register of Historic Places listings in Wake County, North Carolina
