= Queen's Castle =

Historic house in New York, United States

- U.S. National Register of Historic Places
- Location within New York Location within the United States
- Location: NY 414, Lodi, New York
- Coordinates: 42°33′3″N 76°52′54″W
- Area: 0.5 acres (0.20 ha)
- Built: ca. 1881
- Architect: Nash, Arthur
- NRHP reference No.: 99000564
- Added to NRHP: June 01, 1999

Queen's Castle, also known as Camp Fossenvue or simply Fossenvue (an anagram for "seven of us")), is the remnant of a historic camp located at Lodi in Seneca County, New York. It is a rustic, lakeside camp structure built about 1881 on the shore of Seneca Lake.

== Background ==
It is a one-story, roughly square, 17 feet, 6 inches by 18 feet, structure surmounted by a steeply pitched wood shingled hipped roof. It is the sole surviving component of Camp Fossenvue, established in 1875 as an informal, lakeside summer retreat where liberally minded young women could indulge in a variety of radical, even scandalous, intellectual, physical, and recreational activities. Its last year of operation as a women's camp was in 1901. In 1924, the site was sold to the Elmira Council of Boy Scouts for Camp Seneca, which continued to operate until 1989. The United States Department of Agriculture purchased the property in 1996, adding it to the Finger Lakes National Forest.

It was designed by "locally prominent" Arthur Nash, who appears to be North Carolina architect Arthur C. Nash, born in Geneva, New York.)

It was listed on the National Register of Historic Places in 1999.
