= Dramatic and performing arts at the University of North Carolina at Chapel Hill =

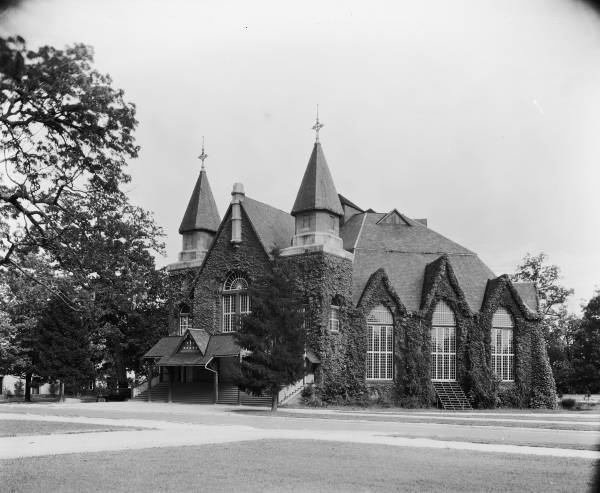
The first Memorial Hall, pictured in 1885

== Carolina Performing Arts ==
Carolina Performing Arts is the name adopted by the UNC Office of the Executive Director for the Arts, the department responsible for the planning and promotion of the performing arts program, and for venues such as Memorial Hall, Historic Playmakers Theatre, and Gerrard Hall on the University's campus.

== PlayMakers Repertory Company ==
PlayMakers Repertory Company is the fully professional theater company of the UNC Department of Dramatic Art. The Company's seasons run from September to April and include both classical and contemporary performances, as well as ongoing educational programs.

=== Origins ===
The name of the Company is derived from the Carolina Playmakers, a theatre group at the University founded in 1918, who played a significant role in developing folk drama in the United States. The modern "PlayMakers" was formed in 1978.

== Venues ==
=== Memorial Hall ===
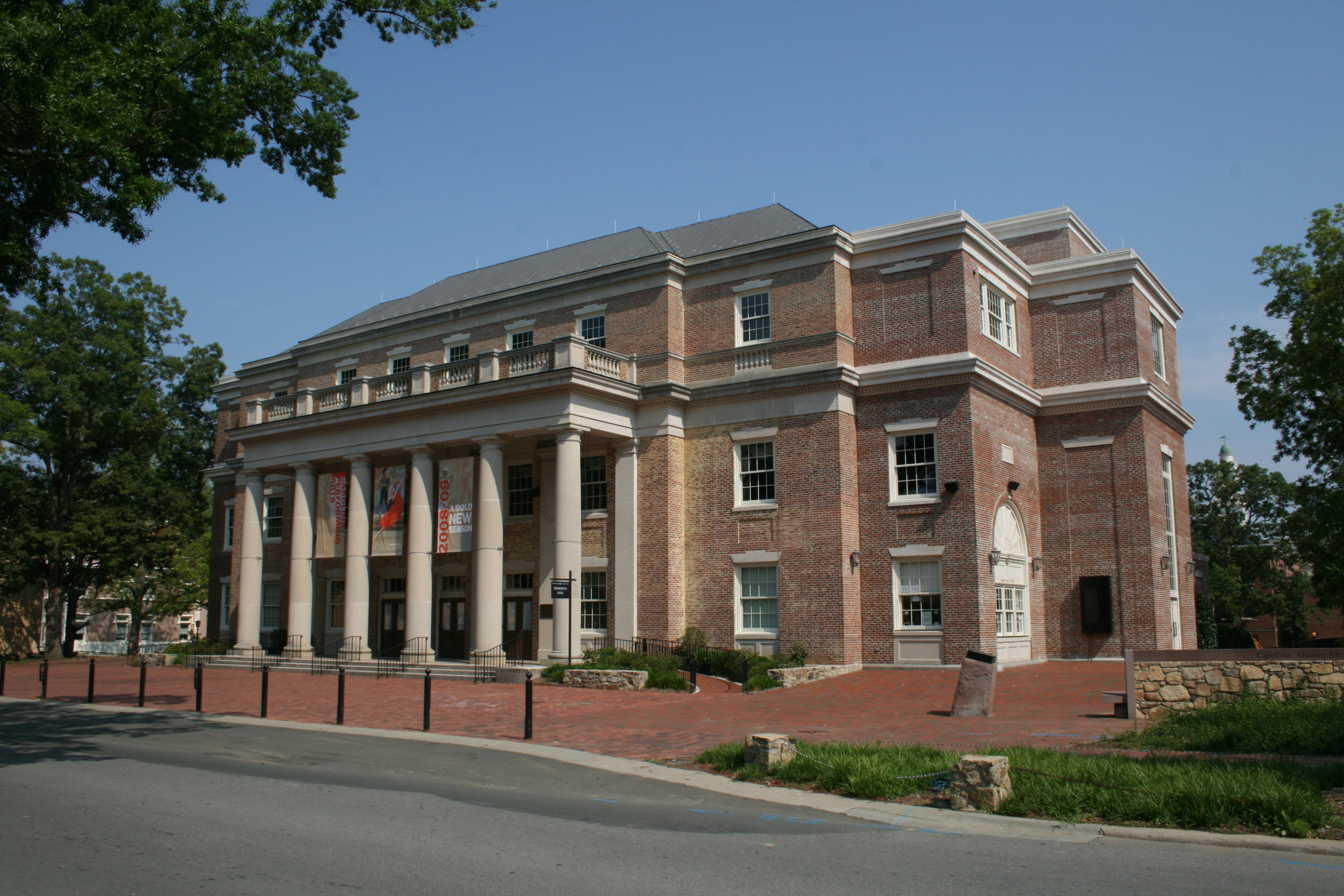
Memorial Hall in July, 2008.

The original Memorial Hall was commissioned in 1883, when Gerrard Hall was deemed too small for the University's commencement ceremonies. Planned as a memorial to former president David Lowry Swain and alumni lost during conflicts such the Civil War, the building was financed by sale of marble tablets dedicated in their name. However, in 1929, the structure was condemned as structurally unsound and demolished. The replacement Memorial Hall opened in 1931 with only the marble tablets retained. After an $18 million refurbishment between 2002 and 2005, the venue currently hosts music, dance, theater, and lectures by invited speakers.

=== Playmakers Theatre ===
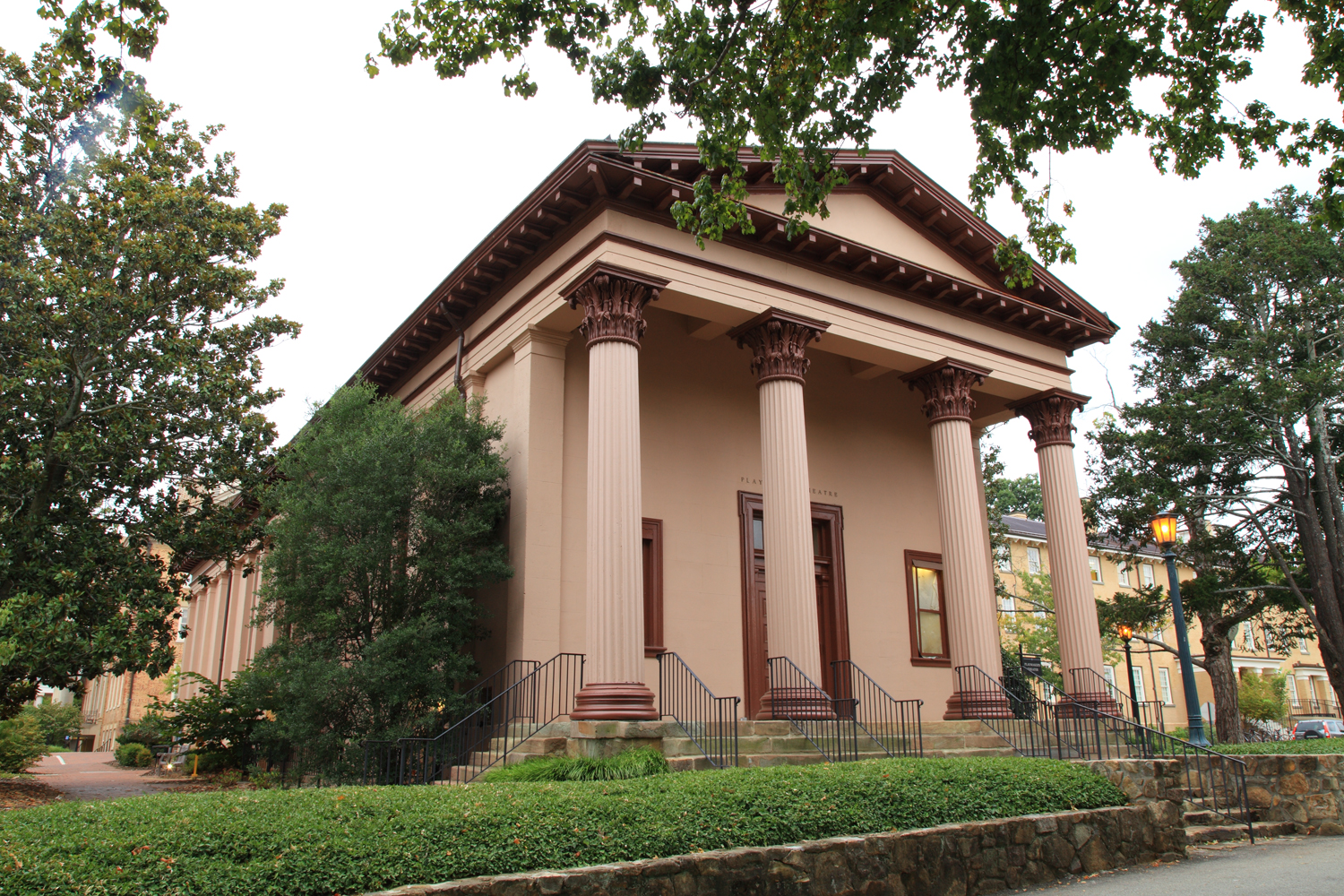
Playmakers Theatre, a National Historic Landmark and former home to the Carolina Playmakers theater group

Playmakers Theatre is a Greek Revival temple built in 1850, that was originally designed by New York architect Alexander Jackson Davis as Smith Hall, a combined library and ballroom. After also being used as a laboratory, bath house, and law school, it became a theater in 1923. The Theatre is the perpetual home of the Carolina Playmakers, although their successor, the Playmakers Repertory Company, uses the Paul Green Theatre as their primary venue. It was added to the National Register of Historic Places in 1971 and designated a National Historic Landmark in 1973.

=== Paul Green and Kenan Theatres ===
The Paul Green Theatre is a modern 500-seat venue located within the UNC Center of Dramatic Art. Named for Pulitzer Prize-winning playwright and author Paul Green, the Theatre opened in 1978. Elizabeth Price Kenan Theatre is an extension to the main theater with a capacity of 200.
