= Margaret Bland =

American playwright and poet

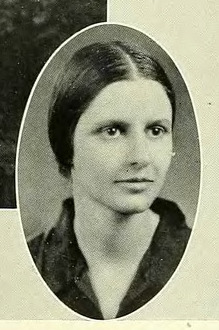
- Margaret Bland, from the 1927 yearbook of Agnes Scott College
- Born: November 24, 1898; Charlotte, North Carolina
- Died: March 21, 1996 (aged 97)
- Education: Charlotte Female Institute; Agnes Scott College; University of North Carolina at Chapel Hill; Yale School of Drama
- Occupations: Playwright, dramatist, writer

Margaret Bland (November 24, 1898 – March 21, 1996) was an American playwright and poet who participated in the Playmakers Folk Drama movement at the University of North Carolina in the early part of the twentieth century. The UNC program, which produced such prominent writers as Paul Green and Thomas Wolfe, was an influential component of the wider Little Theatre Movement at the time.

== Ancestry ==
Margaret Clarkson Bland, born in Charlotte, North Carolina, had ancestors from both England and France. Her mother, Margaret Simons Clarkson, was a descendant of Huguenots (French Protestants) who immigrated from France to the Carolina colonies in the seventeenth and eighteenth centuries. Her father, Mortimer Alberto Bland, was a descendant of an ancient English family known in the West Riding of Yorkshire since the thirteenth century.

== Parentage ==
Bland's father, Mortimer Bland, was a dentist and businessman in Charlotte, North Carolina. A staunch Episcopalian and a loyal Democrat, he was also a Confederate veteran of the American Civil War, having enlisted at Lincolnton, North Carolina, at the age of sixteen. In his later re-enlistment he joined the Palmetto Guard of Charleston, a company of the Second South Carolina Infantry, and fought in defense of Charleston and its sea islands. In one artillery exchange, he was wounded by the explosion of a mortar shell. In recognition of his bravery under fire, he was later promoted to the rank of captain.

The Clarksons, her mother's family, were prominent in both North and South Carolina, being descended from Scottish immigrants through Thomas Boston Clarkson (1809-1879) of Charleston. Some Clarksons were Presbyterian, and others were Episcopalian. All were Democrats. Margaret Clarkson was born and raised in Charlotte, where she was educated in local schools. She was a member of the first graduating class of the prestigious Charlotte Female Institute in 1884. Fifty years later, she gave a welcoming address to the graduating class of 1934 explaining why "Female" was no longer in the current name of the college, Queens-Chicora (now Queens University of Charlotte).

== Early life and education ==
Margaret Bland spent her childhood at the family home in Charlotte and was educated in the Charlotte public schools, where her burgeoning interest in dramatic literature and her fluency in French began to develop. She spent school vacations in a rustic inn in Little Switzerland, a resort community high in the Blue Ridge Mountains of western North Carolina. The inn and the community had been founded by her uncle Heriot Clarkson in 1910. He was a justice of the North Carolina Supreme Court, a proponent of prohibition, an advocate of the Good Roads Movement, and an active member of the Episcopal church. It was in Little Switzerland that Bland made friends with local Appalachian people (Southern highlanders) and became acquainted with some of their stories, folkways, and dialects of Appalachian English.

After high school, Bland attended Agnes Scott College, a small school for women in Decatur, Georgia. Stimulated by the liberal arts curriculum and the creative atmosphere of the campus, Bland began to work on her first plays and to write poems. After graduating in 1920, she pursued her interest in playwriting through studies in the Department of Dramatic Arts of the University of North Carolina at Chapel Hill, specializing in one-act plays. She eventually earned a Master of Fine Arts degree. In 1929-1930, she studied at the Yale School of Drama (then the Department of Drama in the School of Fine Arts), in New Haven, Connecticut.

== Literary career ==
=== Early plays ===
At the University of North Carolina, Margaret Bland became an active member of the Carolina Playmakers, now known as the PlayMakers Repertory Company. Her first notable work was a one-act folk drama entitled Lighted Candles. Based on a true story, it concerns a young mountain woman who had been deserted by her husband and who had reluctantly accepted the proposal of a new suitor. Haunted by memories of her fugitive spouse, she spends her wedding night staring at candles she has lighted in the vain hope of welcoming him back home. Produced and published in 1927, the drama was performed a number of times by the Playmakers in succeeding years.

The Drama Workshop in Atlanta performed a three-act version of Lighted Candles in 1930, of which a reviewer in the Atlanta Journal wrote, "Its characters, instead of being stereotyped or standardized as such too often have been, are true Southern highlanders, not only in speech and manner but in the doings of mind and heart--they are individuals all." Frederick Koch, founder and director of the Carolina Playmakers, said of the dialogue in Lighted Candles that "much of the conversation the author has remembered and cherished for us [is] in this play." Rodney Crowther, in an article in the Asheville Citizen, wrote that "Margaret Bland had accomplished something comparable in beauty to many of the same sort of brief studies for which Guy de Maupassant in his short stories became so famous."

Bland wrote another one-act play, Pink and Patches, in 1928. Also based on characters living in a remote area of the Blue Ridge Mountains, it concerns a teenage girl who yearns for a pink dress and a society woman from the outside world who brings her an old, patched garment as a present. The comedy was an immediate success, winning a prize in an international competition in New York City. Richard Lockridge, writing in The New York Sun, called it "an imaginative thing, a little overburdened with dialect but original and by no means badly conceived or executed." It was frequently performed, mostly by school groups, for several decades after it was first published. In 1960, it was the inspiration for a short musical play, A Pink Party Dress, written by Mark Bucci and David Rogers and published in an acting edition by Samuel French.

=== Francophilia ===
In the late 1920s, having become a devoted Francophile and an accomplished Francophone, Margaret Bland made her first trip to France. She would return often throughout her life, sometimes staying for extended periods. She usually spent most of her time in Paris, studying subtleties of the language and the structure of dramatic literature.

=== Married life and later career ===
In 1930, Margaret Bland left Yale Drama School, returned to the South, and married Frank Anderson Sewell, a widowed insurance executive with two daughters. Family lore says that he had pursued her unsuccessfully before she left for New Haven, but then eventually appeared there carrying an almost life-size bust of Dante, her favorite poet, which apparently convinced her to marry him. They were married at her mother's home in Charlotte and eventually settled in Atlanta.

Stepmother to two girls, Sallie and Julia, and mother to two children of her own, Edith and Frank Jr., she not only managed a busy domestic household but continued to write and publish plays and poems under her maiden name. She also served on the faculty of nearby Agnes Scott College, her alma mater, where she taught classes in both playwriting and French. For a time, she conducted independent research on Eugène Ionesco, the Romanian-French playwright who was one of the foremost figures of the avant-garde Parisian theater, the Theatre of the Absurd. She was also actively affiliated with the Alliance Française and the American Association of Teachers of French. Later in life, as a member of the Executive Committee of the biracial Georgia Council on Human Relations, she became active in efforts to promote racial equality in the South. As a socially conscious person, she was dedicated to working with black Americans to help them overcome obstacles in the voter registration process.

=== Later plays ===
Two of Margaret Bland's later plays were particularly successful. In 1935, she published First at Bethel, a play about an incident in a small Southern town. The time is 1928. An aging Confederate veteran is prevented from marching in a reunion parade with his buddies by his officious daughter-in-law, on grounds that he is too old and weak to march. He is bitterly disappointed. But some young people tell the mayor of the town that the old man has been denied his fondest wish, whereupon the mayor invites him to ride in the official car, ahead of everyone else. After some delays in starting the parade, his final words show his pride in his service to the South during the Civil War. "Let 'em wait. Ain't they holding up this whole confounded parade for me? Me, that was first at Bethel, farthest at Gettysburg, and last at Appomatox." The band plays "Dixie" as the curtain falls.

In 1951, in Land and Larnin', Bland returned to her early interest in the Southern highlanders of the Blue Ridge Mountains. Sixteen-year-old Hessie lives with her mother on hardscrabble mountain land, which is difficult to farm without a man. Her ma wants her to marry a young widower with adjoining bottom land, but Hessie is reluctant. Her teacher has instilled in her a love of learning, and she longs to get away to a different life where she can pursue higher education. She is desolate at the thought of settling down with an uneducated man in a monotonous and brutal existence. Her old granny is sympathetic to her plight and helps her get away to a new life. The theme of young people yearning to escape the isolation of the high mountains is recurrent in Bland's Appalachian folk dramas.

== Bibliography ==
- 1920. "My Song." In The Poets of the Future: A College Anthology for 1918-1920, edited by Henry T. Schnittkind. Boston: Stratford Co. Publishers, p. 164.
- 1924. "My Years." In Aurora, vol. 33, no. 4 (Decatur, Ga.: Agnes Scott College, Division of Student Affairs), p. 196.
- 1927. Lighted Candles. In Carolina Folk-Plays: Third Series, edited by Frederick H. Koch. New York: Henry Holt, pp. 161–168.
- 1928. Pink and Patches. A Play in One Act. New York and London: Samuel French.
- 1929. Dead Expense. Franklin, Ohio: Eldridge Entertainment House.
- 1929. The Princess Who Could Not Dance. A Pretty One-Act Play for Children. Franklin, Ohio: Eldridge Entertainment House.
- 1935. First at Bethel. A Comedy in One Act. New York and London: Samuel French.
- 1935. The Spinach Spitters. A Play in One Act. Boston: Walter H. Baker Co.
- 1943. Jinsey. New York and London: Samuel French.
- 1951. Land and Larnin'. A Comedy-Drama in One Act. New York and London: Samuel French.
- 1984. Shadows of Things Past. New York: Vantage Press. A self-published collection of poems, organized into sections for sonnets, ballades, triolets, haiku, lyrics, free verse in dialect, and narrative poetry. The poems range from "A Student's Sonnet Cycle" (1918/19) to "Though the Old House Must Fall" (1972).

== Awards and honors ==
- 1925. Poetry Prize in the Agnes Scott Alumnae Contest
- 1925. Society Prize of the Poetry Society of South Carolina
- 1927. Belasco Little Theater Tournament for one of the four best unpublished plays, Pink and Patches
- 1972. Second Prize for the Pen and Brush Pat Davis Memorial Prize for Poetry

== Retirement ==
Some years after retiring, Margaret Sewell moved to Honolulu, Hawaii, to be near her daughter Edith and stepdaughter Sallie. She wrote no more plays, but she continued to write poems, remaining mentally acute and intellectually curious well into her late 90s. The multiculturalism of Honolulu kindled her appreciation of Asian philosophies, particularly Buddhism and its Noble Eightfold Path to spiritual enlightenment. The tenor of the 1970s seems to have markedly intensified her lifelong interest in American politics. Bemoaning her perception that she was the only Democrat in her retirement home, she missed no opportunity to broadcast her party affiliation. In the winter of 1972, while out walking, she encountered a motorcade for visiting Republican president Richard Nixon. When a police officer tried to prevent her from crossing an intersection, she brandished her walking stick and cried, "You can't stop me. I am a Democrat!"
