= Nash House (601 Rock Street, Little Rock, Arkansas) =

Historic house in Arkansas, United States

- U.S. National Register of Historic Places
- U.S. Historic district – Contributing property
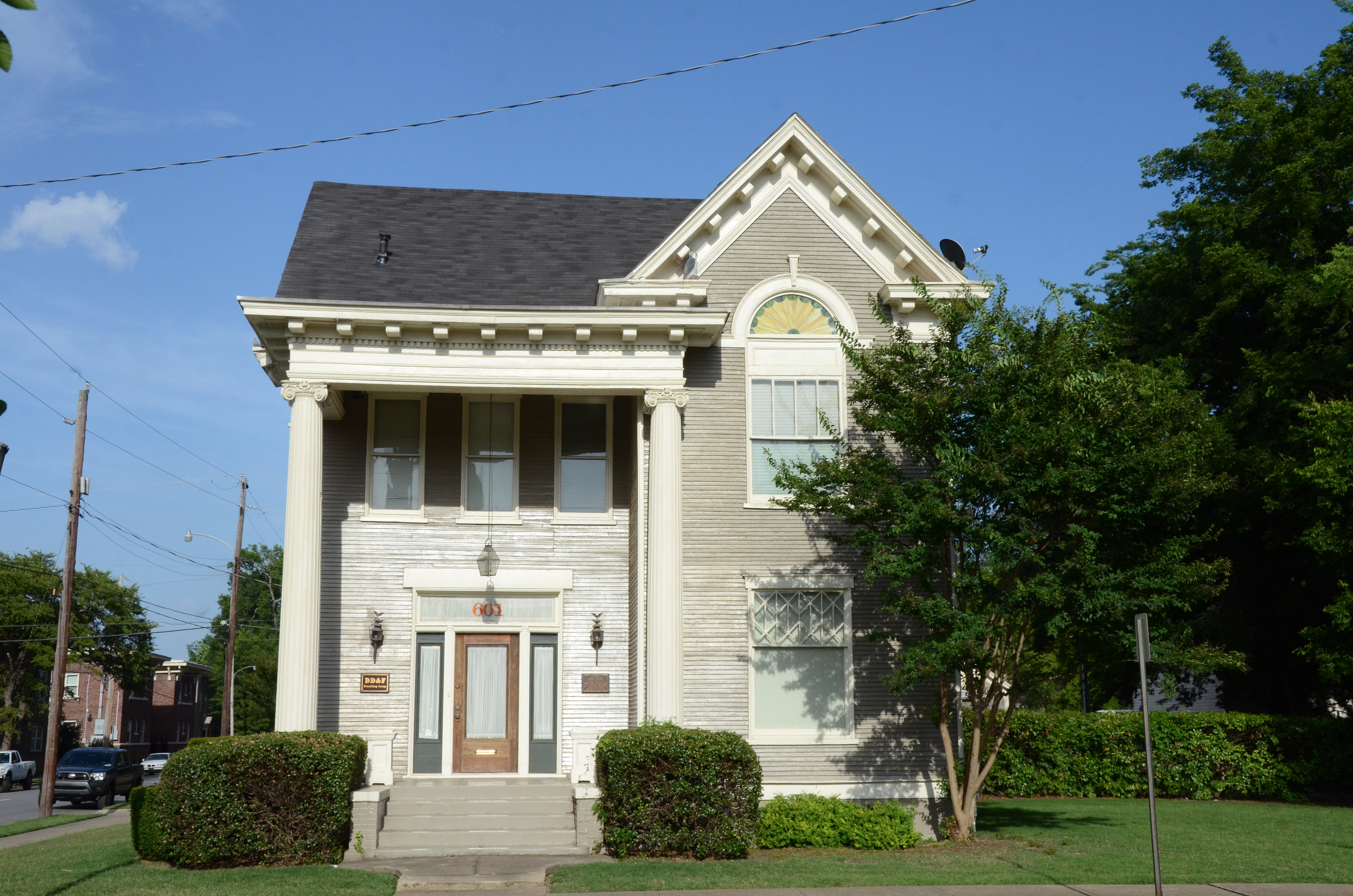

- Location within Arkansas Location within the United States
- Location: 601 Rock St., Little Rock, Arkansas
- Coordinates: 34°44′32″N 92°16′2″W
- Built: 1907
- Architect: Charles L. Thompson
- Architectural style: Colonial Revival, Georgian Revival
- Part of: MacArthur Park Historic District (ID77000269)
- MPS: Thompson, Charles L., Design Collection TR
- NRHP reference No.: 82000914

Significant dates
- Added to NRHP: December 22, 1982
- Designated CP: July 25, 1977

The Nash House is a historic house at 601 Rock Street in Little Rock, Arkansas. It is a two-story wood-frame structure, with a side-gable roof and clapboard siding. A two-story gabled section projects on the right side of the main facade, and the left side has a two-story flat-roof porch, with large fluted Ionic columns supporting an entablature and dentillated and modillioned eave. Designed by Charles L. Thompson and built in 1907, it is a fine example of a modestly scaled Colonial Revival property. Another house that Thompson designed for Walter Nash stands nearby.

The house was listed on the National Register of Historic Places in 1982.

== See also ==
- Nash House (409 East 6th Street, Little Rock, Arkansas)
- National Register of Historic Places listings in Little Rock, Arkansas
