= Ray Dooley (actor) =

American actor (born 1952)

Ray Dooley (born December 20, 1952) is an American actor and company member at the PlayMakers Repertory Company in Chapel Hill, North Carolina, and has performed on Broadway, film and television. He is currently the head of the Professional Actor Training Program (PATP) at the University of North Carolina Chapel Hill (UNC) and is a drama faculty member.

== Early life ==
Ray Dooley was raised on Long Island, New York. He received his M.F.A. in Acting from the American Conservatory Theater in San Francisco, and his B.A. in English and Theatre & Drama (Phi Beta Kappa) from Hamilton College in Clinton, New York.

== PlayMakers ==
After tiring of what he described as a "nomadic lifestyle", Dooley came to UNC to re-establish his creative ties with PlayMakers artistic director David Hammond who was an instructor at American Conservatory Theater when Dooley was a student. While in Chapel Hill Dooley continued with other work, including plays, commercials, film and directing.

At UNC, Professor Dooley primarily teaches acting in the Professional Actor Training Program. He was named Interim Chair of the Department in 1999, and became Chair in 2000. As a company member with PlayMakers Repertory Company, the professional theatre associated with the department, he has appeared in more than forty productions since coming to Chapel Hill in 1989.

== Selected performances ==
=== Broadway ===
- So Long on Lonely Street as Raymond Brown – Ran from April 3, 1986 – May 18, 1986
- Macbeth as Malcolm – Ran from January 28, 1982 – February 14, 1982
- The Stitch in Time as Major Miller – Never officially opened – January 6, 1981

=== Off-Broadway ===
- Wild Oats as Harry Thunder at the CSC Theatre
- Henry IV, Part 1 as Actor at CSC Repertory Company

=== Filmography ===
- The Trial of Standing Bear (1988)
- Stonebrook (1998)

== Union memberships ==
Actors' Equity Association, Screen Actor's Guild, the American Federation of Television and Radio Artists, Canadian Actor's Equity, the North Carolina Theatre Conference, and the National Association of Schools of Theatre.

== Awards ==
- Ray won a Village Voice Obie Award for his 1981 Off-Broadway role in Peer Gynt.
- Robert's Reviews' 2003 Triangle Theater Award, Best Supporting Actor (Uncle Vanya and Dinner With Friends)
- Robert's Reviews' 2004 Triangle Theater Award, Best Actor (Not About Heroes).

== Recent (e.g. 2006) activities ==
Dooley returned from Austria, appearing as Father Flynn in the European premiere of John Patrick Shanley's Pulitzer Prize and Tony winner Doubt: A Parable, directed by Martin L. Platt at Vienna's English Theatre. The Wiener Zeitung wrote, "Wendy Barrie-Wilson and Ray Dooley are very convincing as the stubborn nun and the helpless priest whose only channel of escape is through the male-dominated hierarchy of the Catholic Church." The Kronenzeitung reported, "This is an impressive performance. Much applause." In 2006 he was Cyrano in Cyrano de Bergerac at the Playmakers Repertory Company.
