= Nash House (409 East 6th Street, Little Rock, Arkansas) =

Historic house in Arkansas, United States

- U.S. National Register of Historic Places
- U.S. Historic district – Contributing property
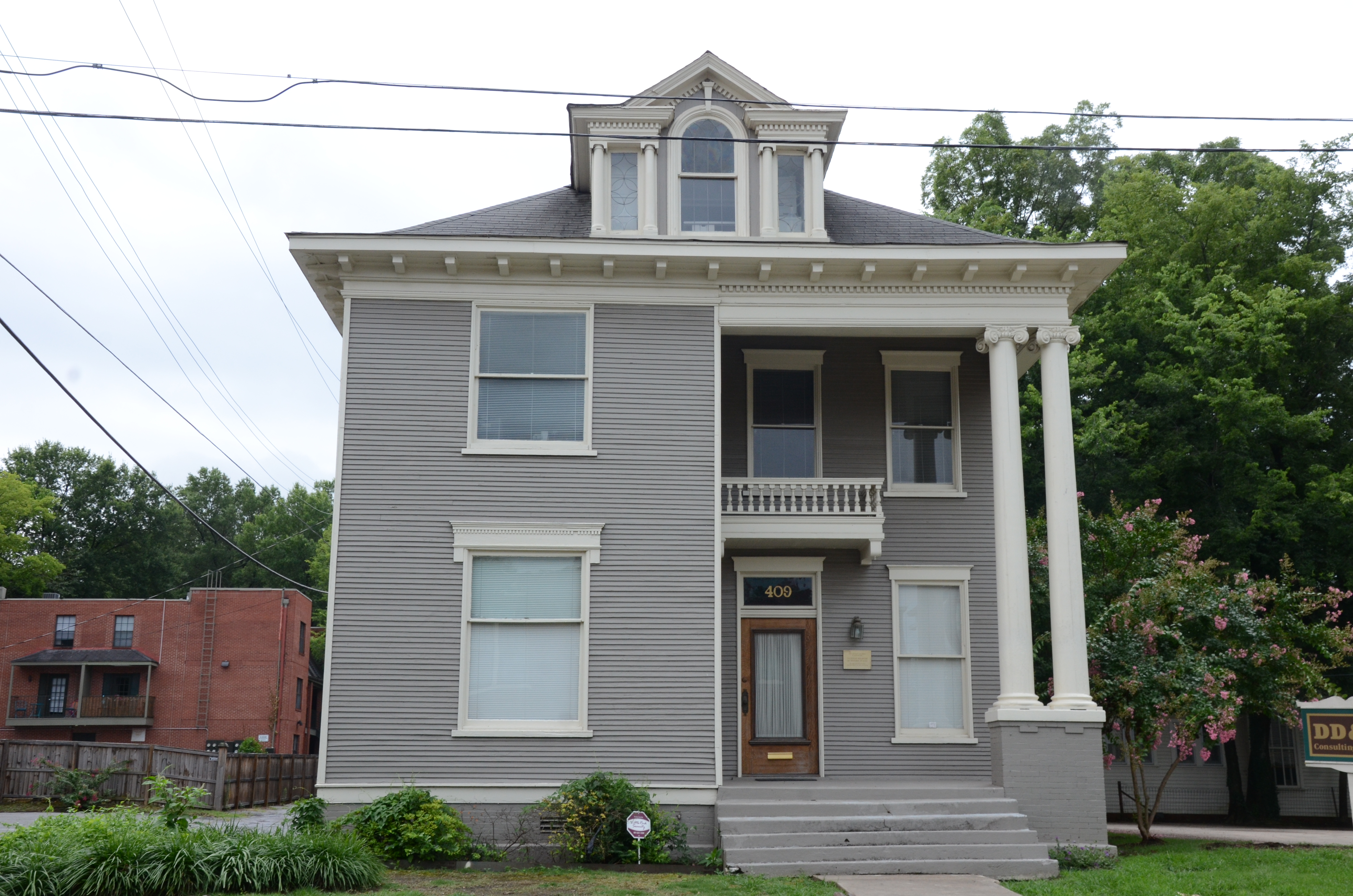

- Location within Arkansas Location within the United States
- Location: 409 E. 6th St., Little Rock, Arkansas
- Coordinates: 34°44′32″N 92°16′2″W
- Built: 1907
- Architect: Charles L. Thompson
- Architectural style: Colonial Revival
- Part of: MacArthur Park Historic District (ID77000269)
- MPS: Thompson, Charles L., Design Collection TR
- NRHP reference No.: 82000913

Significant dates
- Added to NRHP: December 22, 1982
- Designated CP: July 25, 1977

The Nash House is a historic house at 409 East 6th Street in Little Rock, Arkansas. It is a two-story wood-frame structure, with a hip roof and weatherboard siding. The main facade is divided in two, the right half recessed to create a porch on the right side, supported by a pair of two-story Ionic column. The roof has an extended eave with modillions, and a hip-roof dormer projects to the front, with an elaborate three-part window. The house was designed by Charles L. Thompson and built about 1907.

The house was listed on the National Register of Historic Places in 1982.

== See also ==
- Nash House (601 Rock Street), a similar Thompson design just around the corner
