= Chapel Hill Historic District (Chapel Hill, North Carolina) =

Historic district in North Carolina, United States

- U.S. National Register of Historic Places
- U.S. Historic district
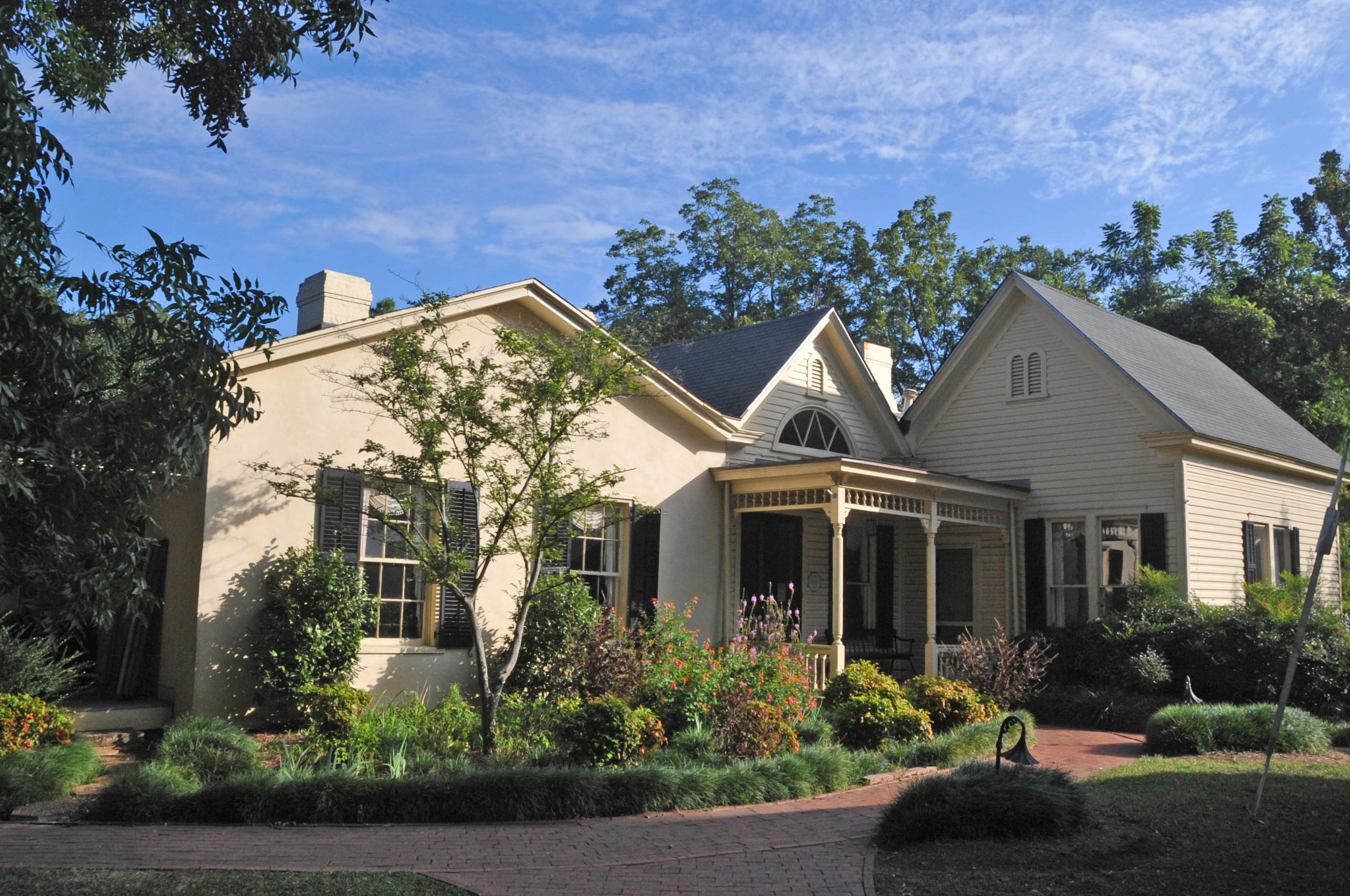
- Horace Williams House, March 2007

- Location within North Carolina Location within the United States
- Location: Battle Park, E. Franklin and E. Rosemary Sts. residences, and central campus of University of North Carolina, Chapel Hill, North Carolina
- Coordinates: 35°54′45″N 79°03′08″W
- Area: 328 acres (133 ha)
- Built: 1795
- Architect: Multiple
- Architectural style: Classical Revival, Jacobean Revival
- NRHP reference No.: 71000604 (original); 15000165 (increase)

Significant dates
- Added to NRHP: December 16, 1971
- Boundary increase: April 16, 2015

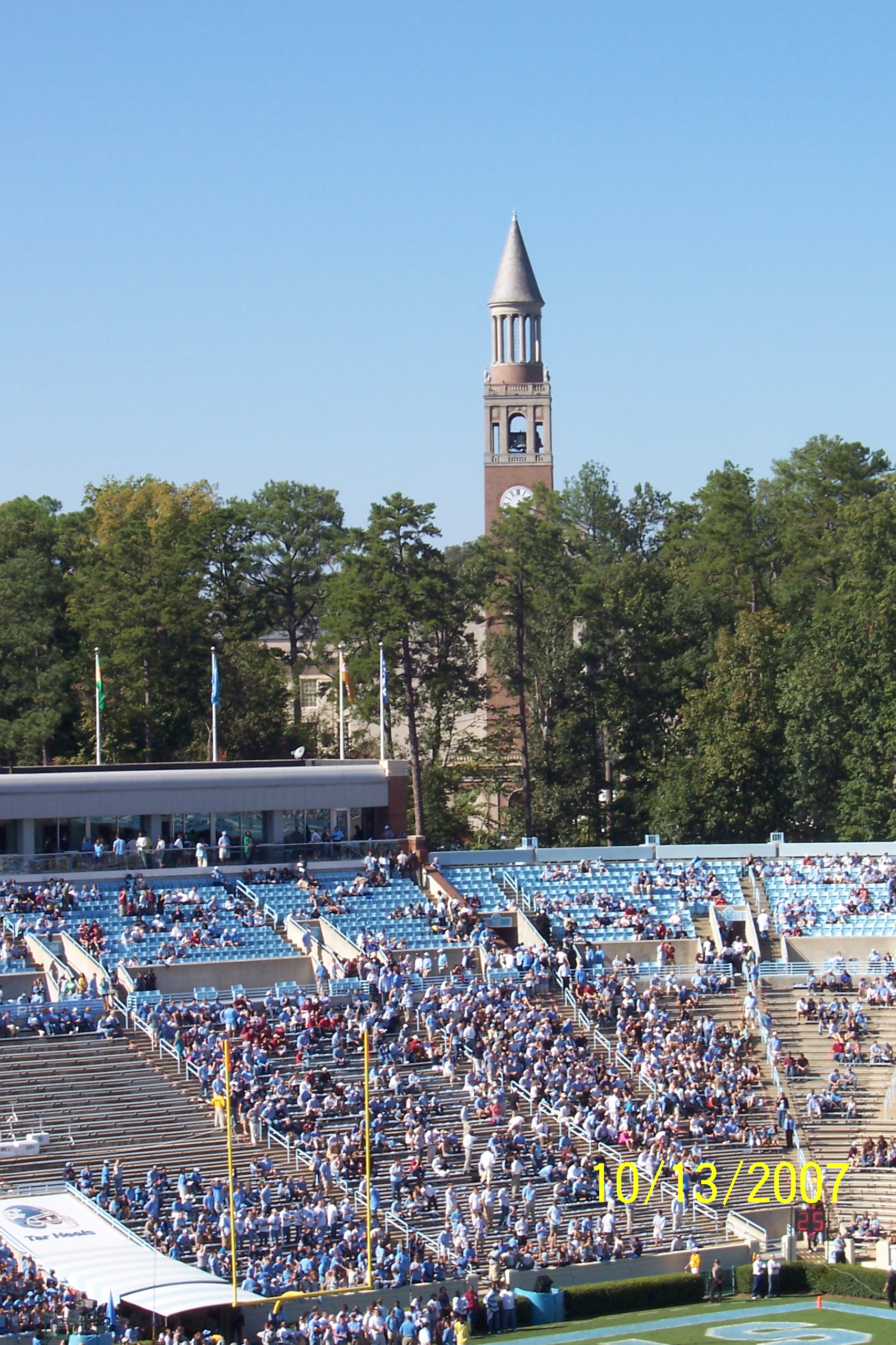
UNC Bell Tower, 2007

Chapel Hill Historic District is a national historic district located at Chapel Hill, Orange County, North Carolina. The district encompasses 46 contributing buildings, 2 contributing structures, and 2 contributing objects on the central campus of the University of North Carolina at Chapel Hill and surrounding residential sections of Chapel Hill. The district's buildings date from 1793 to the early-20th century and include notable examples of Classical Revival and Jacobean Revival architecture. Located in the district and separately listed are the Chapel of the Cross, Old East, building and Playmakers Theatre. Other notable contributing resources are the Davie Poplar, Old West (1822), South Building (1798), the Old Well, Person Hall (1797), Gerrard Hall (1822), New East (c. 1860), New West, the Joseph Caldwell Monument (1858), the Y.M.C.A. Building, Battle-Vance-Pettigre11 Dormitory (1913), Horace Williams House (1854), the Phillips Law Office, the Phillips House (1856), the Old Methodist Church (1853), Senlac (1843, 1876), Hippol Castle (1920s), and Battle Park.

It was listed on the National Register of Historic Places in 1971, and enlarged in 2015.
