= Arthur Nash (architect) =

American architect

Arthur Cleveland Nash (1871-1969) was an American architect.

He was born in Geneva, New York. He attended Phillips Exeter Academy. He studied at Ecole des Beaux-Arts in Paris. He worked with McKim, Mead and White in designing several noteworthy buildings in North Carolina, New York, and elsewhere.

Several of his works are listed on the U.S. National Register of Historic Places.

Works include:

- Louis Round Wilson Library, completed 1929, on the campus of the University of North Carolina at Chapel Hill
- Carolina Inn, built 1923, 211 Pittsboro St. Chapel Hill, North Carolina (Nash, Arthur C.), NRHP-listed
- One or more works in Morehead Hill Historic District (boundary increase), includes portions of Arnette, Vickers, Yancey, Parker and Wells Sts. Durham, North Carolina (Nash, Arthur), NRHP-listed
- Queen's Castle, NY 414 Lodi, New York (Nash, Arthur), NRHP-listed
- Arthur C. and Mary S.A. Nash House, his personal residence, NRHP-listed
- Sherwood-Jayne House, addition to north end added by Nash, 55 Old Post Rd. East Setauket, New York (Nash, Arthur), NRHP-listed
