= Carolina Inn =

Historic place in North Carolina, United States

- The Carolina Inn
- U.S. National Register of Historic Places
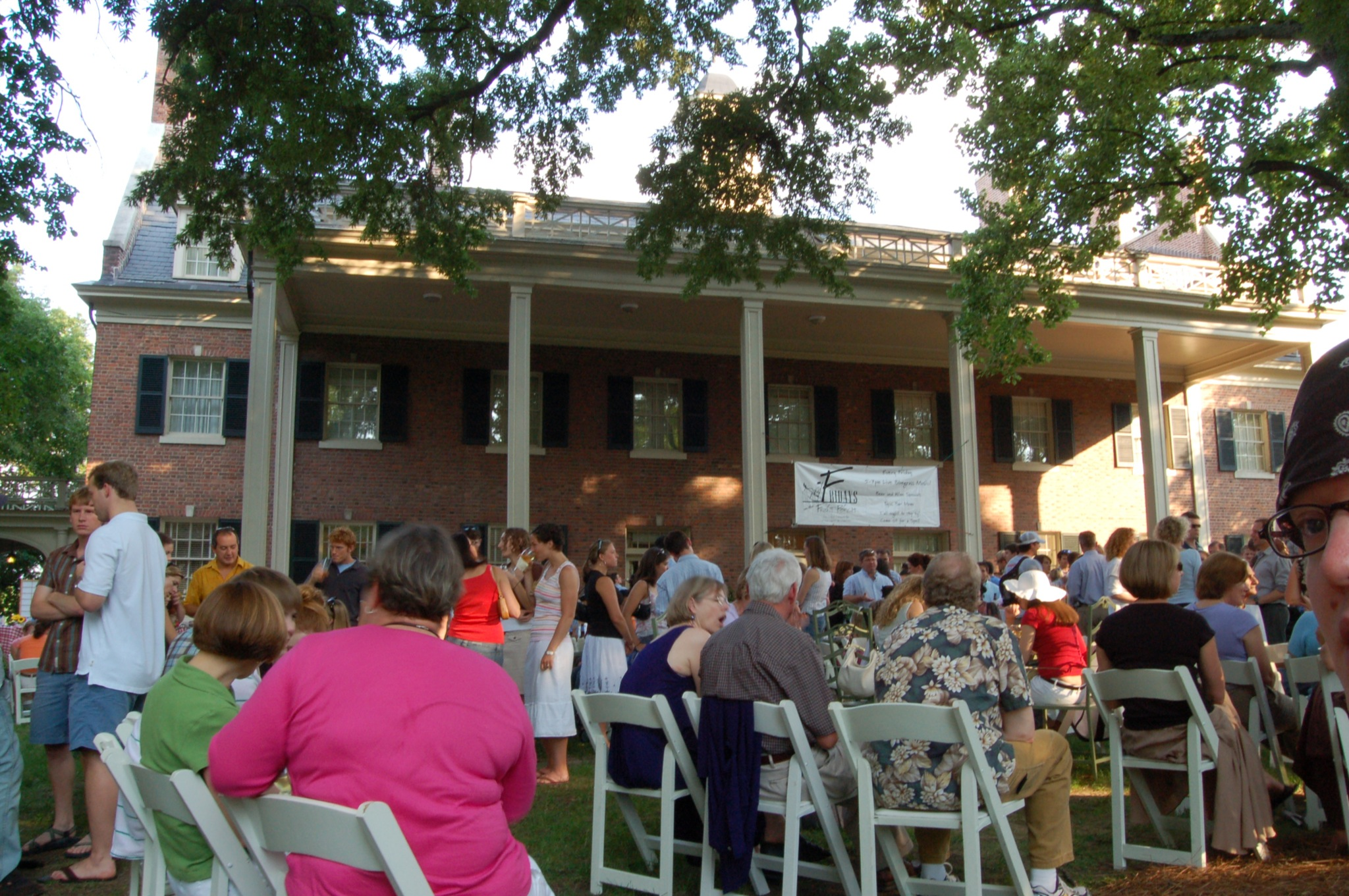

- Location within North Carolina Location within the United States
- Location: 211 Pittsboro St., Chapel Hill, North Carolina
- Coordinates: 35°54′36″N 79°3′18″W
- Area: 4.5 acres (1.8 ha)
- Built: 1923-1924
- Architect: Arthur C. Nash; George Watts Carr; et al.
- Architectural style: Colonial Revival, Classical Revival
- NRHP reference No.: 99000867
- Added to NRHP: August 6, 1999

The Carolina Inn is a hotel owned by the University of North Carolina on the campus of the University of North Carolina at Chapel Hill in Orange County, North Carolina. Opened in 1924, it was listed on the National Register of Historic Places in 1999, and is currently operated for the University by Hyatt.

The original section of the hotel was built by alumnus John Sprunt Hill in 1923–1924 on the site of the chapel that gave the town of Chapel Hill its name, and donated to the university in 1935. The building is Colonial Revival in style, with Classical Revival design elements. Wings were added in 1939–1940, 1969–1970, and 1995. Each section consists of two stories constructed in red brick topped by a gambrel roof with dormers. The front facade of the original block features a two-story portico supported by six tall paneled wooden pillars, and a centrally-placed cupola atop the roof.

The Carolina Inn is a member of Historic Hotels of America, the official program of the National Trust for Historic Preservation. It was managed by Doubletree from 1993 to 2007.

== Sources ==
- "Carolina Inn added to national register". Chapel Hill, N.C.: University Gazette. October 27, 1999.
- "Our Historic Inn". The Carolina Inn. 2008. Archived from the original on July 8, 2008.
- Zogry, Kenneth J. (1999). The University's Living Room: A History of The Carolina Inn. Chapel Hill, N.C.: University of North Carolina at Chapel Hill. ISBN 0-9676063-0-6.
