= Old East =

Historic residence hall at UNC Chapel Hill, North Carolina, United States

- U.S. National Register of Historic Places
- U.S. National Historic Landmark
- U.S. Historic district – Contributing property
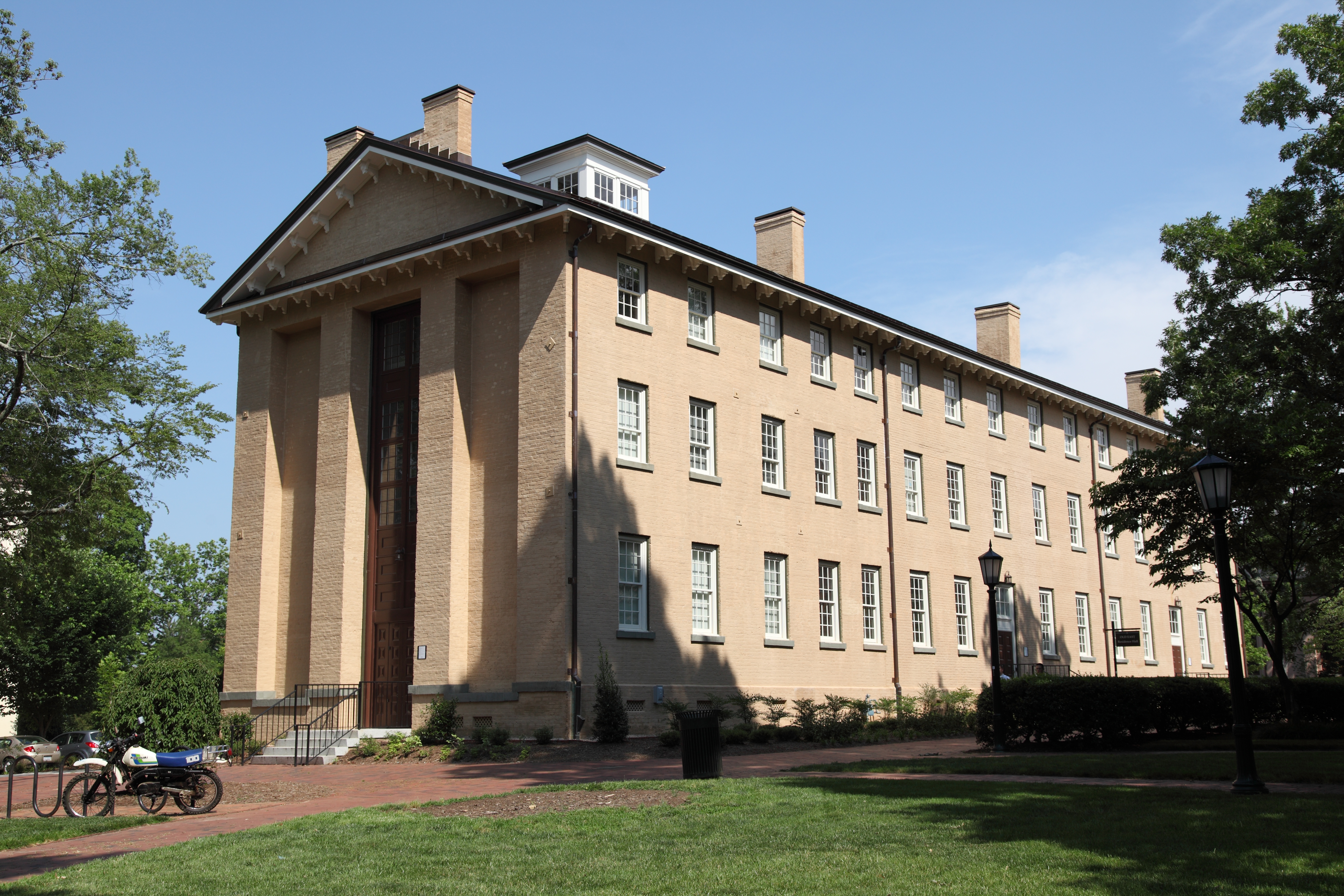
- Old East

- Location within North Carolina Location within the United States
- Location: University of North Carolina campus, Chapel Hill, North Carolina
- Coordinates: 35°54′45″N 79°3′3″W
- Built: 1793
- Architect: Multiple
- Architectural style: Georgian
- Part of: Chapel Hill Historic District (ID71000604)
- NRHP reference No.: 66000596

Significant dates
- Added to NRHP: October 15, 1966
- Designated NHL: December 21, 1965
- Designated CP: December 16, 1971

Old East is a residence hall located at the north part of campus in University of North Carolina at Chapel Hill. Built in 1793 by slave labor, it became the first state university building in the United States. The Wren Building at the College of William & Mary in Williamsburg, Virginia, was built in 1695, but William and Mary did not become a public university until 1906.

== History ==
Colonel John Hogan entered into a contract December 1792, to make 150,000 bricks at the site of where Old East would be built. He also donated 200 acres towards the university grounds. The cornerstone of Old East was laid ceremoniously on October 12, 1793, by William Richardson Davie, who served as the governor of North Carolina from 1798 to 1799. The building was originally two stories tall and contained sixteen rooms. The design reflects the university trustees' vision of a quadrangle that ran north toward the town of Chapel Hill. Although the cost of construction is unknown, there are records from 1799 indicating that the university spent a total of $12,180 for work on Steward's Hall, Old East, Person Hall, and the President's House. After its construction, Old East functioned as both a classroom building and a Residence Hall; today it is exclusively a Residence Hall.

The contractor in charge of the construction of Old East was James Patterson of Chatham County. By 1804, the building needed significant repairs and was renovated with new doors, window sashes, ladders, and the roof was repainted. The third story was added to the building in 1823. Alexander Jackson Davis was hired by the university in 1844 to lengthen the building by a third and to create a new north entrance. The new rooms were used by the Philanthropic Society and also served as a library. Davis' other additions included large north-facing windows encased by brick panels and two brick porches on the east side of the building. Thomas Day, a skilled and respected African-American cabinetmaker, designed and built the interior woodwork in the society rooms. Old East remained the home of the Philanthropic Society until New East was completed in 1860.

== Culture ==
In 1877, Zebulon Baird Vance, the Governor of North Carolina and chair of the Board of Trustees, declared the anniversary of Old East's construction, October 12, was University Day and should "be observed with appropriate ceremonies under the direction of the faculty." Subsequent celebrations of University Day have included speeches by President John F. Kennedy in 1961 and President Bill Clinton in 1993. Students are released from classes the morning of University Day and many migrate to the Old East Birthday Bash, which has in the past included things like cake, athletic signings, puppies, appearances by the chancellor, dance routines, and a capella performances. The building was designated a National Historic Landmark by the National Park Service December 21, 1965.

The Old Well and Old East, as the earliest buildings at UNC, have long been the symbols of the university. There are some collections of art about Old East and the Old Well in Blowing Rock Art and History Museum, North Carolina, as well as in UNC-Chapel Hill's Wilson Library. It is located in the Chapel Hill Historic District.

== See also ==
- Old Well
- University of North Carolina at Chapel Hill student housing
- List of National Historic Landmarks in North Carolina
- National Register of Historic Places listings in Orange County, North Carolina
