= List of defunct newspapers of North Carolina =

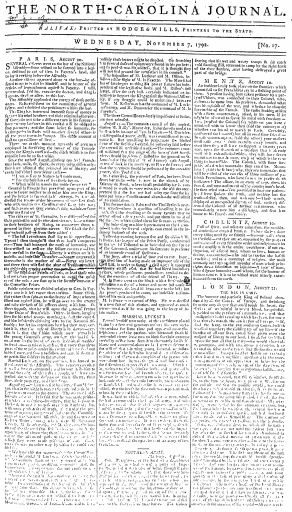
Halifax's North-Carolina Journal, 1792

Most of the newspapers started in North Carolina in the 18th century no longer exist. The first newspaper, the North Carolina Gazette, was published in New Bern, North Carolina. These defunct newspapers of North Carolina were replaced by newspapers that started in the 19th century. With the progress of technology, introduction of social media, and trend towards corporate conglomerate ownership many newspapers did not survive in the 20th and 21st century.

== Newspapers published in the 18th century ==
There are currently 84 newspapers known to have been published in North Carolina between 1751 and 1800. Many newspapers went through one or more title changes, as shown in the table below.

Title(s)	Established	Ceased Publication	City	County	Online Version of Newspaper	Notes and References
North-Carolina gazette and Wilmington weekly post-boy.; The North-Carolina gazette.	1764	1769	Wilmington	New Hanover	External link	
The North-Carolina magazine or, Universal intelligencer.	1764	1768	New Bern	Craven	External link	
The Noth. Carolina gazette.	1751	1799	New Bern	Craven	External link	
The North-Carolina gazette.	1768	1778	New Bern	Craven	External link	
The Cape-Fear mercury.	1769	1775	Wilmington	New Hanover	External link	
The Noth. Carolina gazette, or, New-Bern advertiser.; The North Carolina gazette, or, Impartial intelligencer, and weekly general advertiser.; Martin's North-Carolina gazette.; The North-Carolina gazette.	1780	1799	New Bern	Craven	External link	
The State gazette of North-Carolina.; The Herald of freedom.	1780	?	Edenton; New Bern	Chowan; Craven		
The North Carolina gazette.	1785	1786	Hillsborough	Orange		
The North-Carolina gazette, or, The Edenton intelligencer.; The Edenton inteligencer [sic].	1787	1789	Edenton	Chowan	External link	
The Wilmington centinel, and general advertiser.	1788	1789	Wilmington	New Hanover	External link	
Fayetteville gazette.; The North-Carolina chronicle; or, Fayetteville gazette.	1789	1791	Fayetteville	Cumberland	External link	
Fayetteville gazette.; The North-Carolina centinel and Fayetteville gazette.	1792	1795	Fayetteville	Cumberland	External link	
The North-Carolina journal.	1792	1814	Halifax	Halifax		
The Wilmington chronicle: North Carolina weekly advertiser.	1795	1796	Wilmington	New Hanover	External link	
The North-Carolina Minerva, and Fayetteville advertiser.; The North-Carolina Minerva, and Raleigh advertiser.; The North-Carolina Minerva.; Minerva, or, Anti-Jacobin.; The Minerva.; The Raleigh Minerva.	1796	1821	Fayetteville	Cumberland		
Hall's Wilmington gazette.; The Wilmington gazette.; Wilmington gazette, commercial and political.	1797	1816	Wilmington	New Hanover	External link	
The Newbern gazette.; The Newbern gazette, and political and miscellaneous register.	1798	1804	New Bern	Craven	External link	
The North-Carolina mercury, and Salisbury advertiser.	1798	1801	Salisbury	Rowan	External link	
Raleigh register, and North-Carolina weekly advertiser.; Raleigh register, and North-Carolina state gazette.; Raleigh register, and North-Carolina gazette.; The Weekly Raleigh register.	1799	1863	Raleigh	Wake		
The daily gazette.	1800	?	Washington	Beaufort		
Illustrated southern educator.	1800	?	Durham	Durham		
Herald of the times.	1800	1899	Elizabeth City	Pasquotank		
The herald.	1800	?	Webster	Jackson		
Farm and fireside.	1800	1899	High Point	Guilford		
The farmer and mechanic.	1800	?	Raleigh	Wake		
The Farmer and Scottish chief.	1800	1899	Red Springs	Robeson		
The gazette-messenger.	1800	1909	Washington	Beaufort		
The gazette-messenger.	1800	?	Washington	Beaufort		
The gazette.	1800	?	Raleigh	Wake		
African expositor.	1800	1899	Raleigh	Wake		
Cleaveland banner.; Shelby banner.	1800	1879	Shelby	Cleveland		
The Clinton Caucasian.	1800	?	Clinton	Sampson		
The Henderson index.; The weekly index.	1800	1899	Henderson	Vance		
The Great sunny South.	1800	?	Snow Hill	Greene		
The Battleboro progress.	1800	1899	Battleboro	Edgecombe;Nash		
The Anglo-Saxon.	1800	1899	Goldsboro	Wayne		
The Daily landmark.	1800	?	Statesville	Iredell		
Daily rocket.	1800	?	Rockingham	Richmond		
The deaf mute.	1800	1899	Raleigh	Wake		
The New Berne weekly times.	1800	1874	New Bern	Craven		
The New-Berne Republican and courier.; The Republican & courier.; The Republic and courier.; The Republic-courier.	1800	1879	New Bern	Craven		
The Newbernian.; Daily Newbernian.	1800	1899	New Bern	Craven		
Roanoke patron.	1800	1899	Potecasi	Northampton		
The Messenger - in ashes.	1800	1899	Goldsboro	Wayne		
The progressive reformer.	1800	?	Kings Mountain	Cleveland		
The Raleigh post.	1800	?	Raleigh	Wake		
The recorder.	1800	?	Wilmington	New Hanover		
The nationalist.	1800	?	Raleigh	Wake		
Mountain home-journal.	1800	?	Asheville	Buncombe		
Mountain home-journal.; The morning gazette.	1800	?	Asheville	Buncombe		
The mountaineer.; The Carolina mountaineer.; The Morganton star.; The Morganton herald.	1800	1901	Morganton	Burke		
The Kings Mountain herald.	1800	1974	Kings Mountain	Cleveland		
The Encyclopedian instructor, and farmer's gazette.; The Post-angel, or, Universal entertainment.; The Edenton gazette.	1800	1800	Edenton	Chowan	External link	
The Madison news.	1800	?	Madison	Rockingham		
Marion record.	1800	?	Marion	McDowell		
North Carolina herald.	1800	1899	Asheboro	Randolph		
North Carolina state advertiser.	1800	1899	Raleigh	Wake		
North-Carolina messenger and Warrenton patriotic miscellany.	1800	1899	Warrenton	Warren		
Our rights.	1800	1899	Wilmington	New Hanover		
Our fatherless ones.; Barium messenger.	1800	2014	Barium Springs	Iredell		
The Southern service.	1800	?	Charlotte	Mecklenburg		
Southern voice.	1800	?	Bethel	Pitt		
The southern farmer.	1800	?	Raleigh	Wake		
The Stovall courier.	1800	?	Stovall	Granville		
The Western North Carolina times.; Hendersonville daily times.; Hendersonville times.	1800	1927	Hendersonville	Henderson		
The Washington echo.	1800	1899	Washington	Beaufort		
The Washington messenger.	1800	?	Washington	Beaufort		
The weekly observer.	1800	1899	Charlotte	Mecklenburg		
The star.	1800	?	Highlands	Macon		
State prohibition organ.	1800	?	Raleigh	Wake		
The temperance herald.	1800	1899	Concord	Cabarrus		
Tobacco leaf.	1800	1879	Charlotte	Mecklenburg		
The Christian sun.	1800	?	Elon College;Greensboro	Alamance;Guilford		
Charlotte observer.	1800	1899	Charlotte	Mecklenburg		
The Charlotte chronicle.; Semi-weekly Charlotte observer.; Weekly Charlotte observer.	1800	?	Charlotte	Mecklenburg		
Carolina fruit and truckers journal.	1800	?	Chadbourn;Wilmington	Columbus;New Hanover		
The Carolinian.	1800	1899	New Bern	Craven		
The business guide.	1800	?	Winston-Salem	Forsyth		
The evening bulletin.; The daily bulletin.	1800	1899	Charlotte	Mecklenburg		
The evening chronicle.	1800	1914	Charlotte	Mecklenburg		
Evening press.	1800	1899	Charlotte	Mecklenburg		
The Investigator.	1800	1899	Wilson	Wilson		

== Defunct newspapers established in the 19th and 20th centuries ==
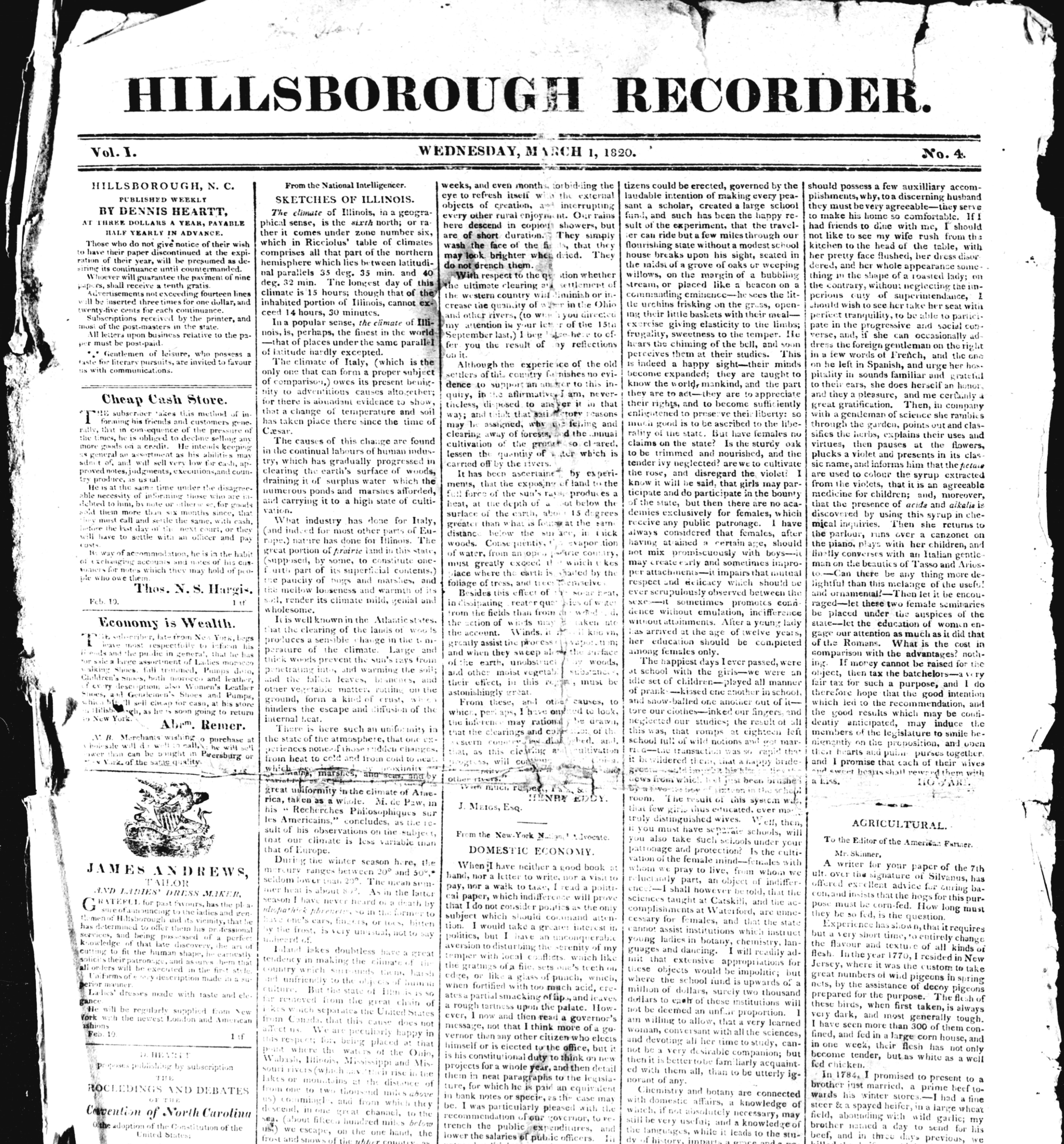
Hillsborough Recorder, March 1, 1820

There were 495 North Carolina newspapers published between 1800 and 1860. There were 1538 North Carolina newspapers published between 1860 and 1900. There were 1,622 North Carolina newspapers published between 1900 and 2010. There were approximately 240 North Carolina newspapers in publication at the beginning of 2020.

List of Defunct North Carolina Newspapers
Title	City	County	Established	Ceased publication	Notes and References
Alamance Gleaner		Alamance County	1856	1875	
American, The	Statesville	Iredell	1858	1870	
The Andrews Journal	Andrews	Cherokee	1959	2018	
Apex Herald	Apex	Wake	?	2013	
Asheville Global Report	Asheville	Buncombe	1999	2011	
Burke County News	Morganton	Burke	1899	1901	
Carolina Times, The	Durham	Durham	1919	1971	
Carolina Watchman	Salisbury	Rowan	1832	1937	
Carrboro Citizen	Carrboro	Orange	2007	2012	
Cary News, The	Cary	Chatham/Wake	1963	2018	(Note: print version, McClatchy)
Caucasian, The	Clinton		188?	1913	
Charlotte News, The	Charlotte	Mecklenburg	1928	1985	
Charlotte News and Evening Chronicle, The	Charlotte	Mecklenburg	1914	1928	
Cherokee Herald	Murphy	Cherokee	1874	1876	
Cherokee Sentinel	Murphy	Cherokee		2012	
Clay County Courier	Hayesville	Clay	1902	19??	
Clay County News	Hayesville	Clay	1926	1938	
Clayton News-Star	Clayton	Johnston/ Wake			
Commonwealth, The	Scotland Neck	Halifax	1882/1896	1884/1929	
Daily Confederate, The	Raleigh	Wake	1864	1865	
Daily Industrial News			?	1909 (circa)	
Daily Southerner, The (Note: The Daily Southerner started out as The Tarboro Free Press in 1826.)	Tarboro	Edgecombe	1826	2014	
Durham Recorder, The	Durham	Durham	1887	188?	
Farmer and Mechanic, The	Raleigh	Wake	1877	1885	
Fayetteville News, The	Fayetteville	Cumberland	1866	1868	
Fayetteville Times, The	Fayetteville	Cumberland	1971	1990	
Franklin Observer	Franklin	Macon	1860		
Garner News	Fuquay-Varina	Wake		2013	
Goldsboro Daily Rough Notes	Goldsboro	Wayne	186?	186?	
Graham Sentinel	Robbinsville	Graham		2012	
Greensboro Daily News	Greensboro	Guilford	1909	1984	
Greensboro Record	Greensboro	Guilford	1930	1984	
Hillsborough Recorder, The	Hillsborough	Orange	1820	1879	
Holly Springs Sun	Holly Springs	Wake		2013	(Note: Daily, owned by Civitas Media)
Macon Advance, The	Franklin	Macon	1877	18??	
Independent Press, The	Concord	Cabarrus			
Mecklenburg Jeffersonian	Charlotte	Mecklenburg	1841	1849	
Mercury, The	Raleigh	Wake			
Messenger, The		Surry			
Milton Chronicle, The	Milton	Caswell			
Milton Spectator, The	Milton	Caswell			
Murphy Advance, The	Murphy	Cherokee	1889	1889	
Murphy Bulletin	Murphy	Cherokee	1885	1889	
North Carolina Standard, The	Raleigh	Wake	1834	1869	
Norwood News, The	Norwood	Stanly			
Old North State, The	Salisbury	Rowan			
Orange County Observer, The	Hillsboro	Orange			
Pender Chronicle	Burgaw	Pender	190?	2012	
Pender Post	Burgaw	Pender	1971	2012	
Raleigh Sentinel	Raleigh	Wake	1865	1877	
Raleigh Times	Raleigh	Wake	1879	1989	
Roanoke News, The	Weldon	Halifax			
Smoky Mountain Sentinel	Hayesville	Clay	1987	2012	(Note: Weekly, Wed., Sentinel News Media)
Statesville American, The	Statesville	Iredell	1870	1886	
Statesville American and Tobacco Journal	Statesville	Iredell	1886	1???	
Suedliche Post, Die	Goldsboro	Wayne	1869	18??	
Daily Southerner, The	Tarboro	Edgecombe	1826	2014	(Note: Daily, owner CNHI)
Tri-Weekly Old North State, The	Salisbury	Rowan			
Topsail Voice	Burgaw	Pender	1991	2012	
Twin City Sentinel	Winston-Salem	Forsyth	?	1985	
Valdese News	Valdese	Burke	1938	1950	
Weekly Courier, The	Warrenton	Warren			
Weekly News, The	Charlotte	Mecklenburg			
Western Carolinian, The	Franklin	Macon	1860	18??	
Western Democrat, The	Charlotte	Mecklenburg	1852	1870	
Western Reporter, The	Franklin	Macon	1880	1881	
Western Sentinel, The	Winston-Salem	Forsyth	1856/1887	1886/1926	
Wilmington Journal, The	Wilmington	New Hanover	1844	1895	

== See also ==
- North Carolina literature
- List of defunct newspapers of the United States

== Images ==
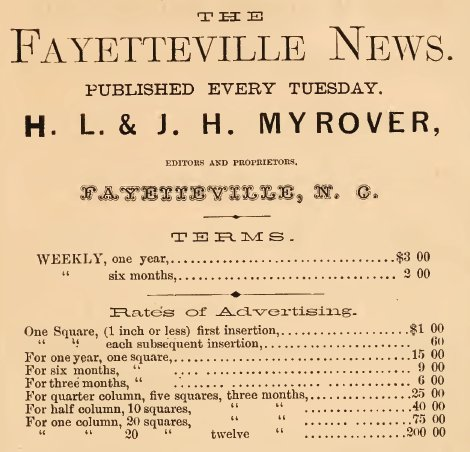
The Fayetteville News

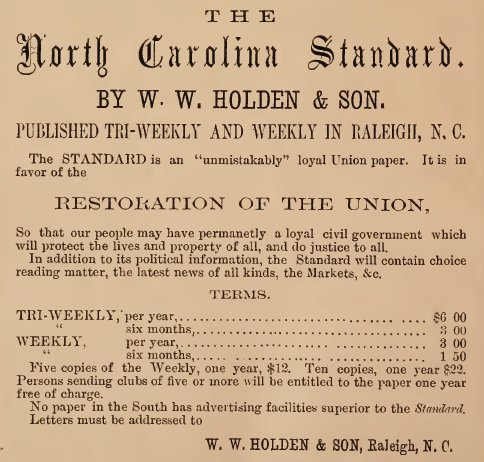
The North Carolina Standard

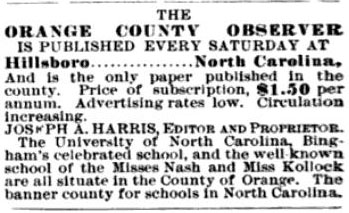
The Orange County Observer

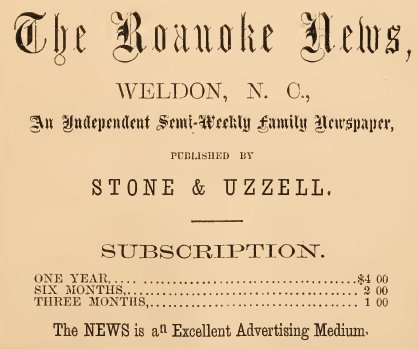
The Roanoke News

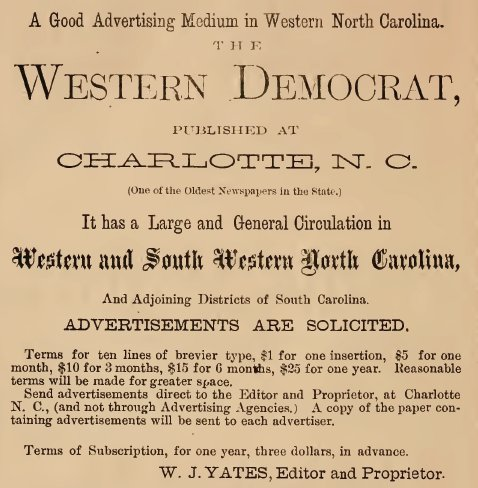
The Western Democrat

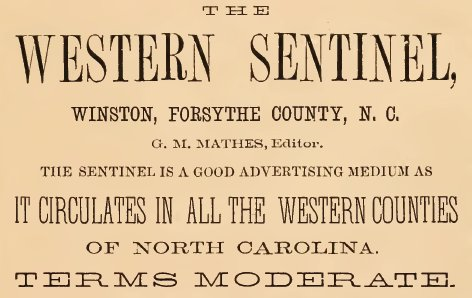
The Western Sentinel

== Bibliography ==
- Arthur, John Preston (1914). "Newspapers". Western North Carolina: a History (from 1730 to 1913). Raleigh: Edwards & Broughton. pp. 449–456.
- Banks, Howard A. (1891). "Country Newspapers in North Carolina". North Carolina University Magazine. 11: 72–77. hdl:2027/hvd.hntreh – via HathiTrust.
- Bennett, D. K. (1858). "Publications in North Carolina, 1858". Chronology of North Carolina. New York: James M. Edney. OCLC 5732917.
- Brigham, Clarence S. (October 1918). "Bibliography of American newspapers, 1690–1820: part 10: North Carolina". Proceedings of the American Antiquarian Society. 28: 63–133.
- Clark, Thomas D. (1948). Southern Country Editor. Bobbs-Merrill. OCLC 525858. (Includes information about weekly rural newspapers in North Carolina)
- Coggeshall, W.T. (1856). The Newspaper Record. Lay & Brothers. pp. 42–44.
- Haley, James T., ed. (1895), "Newspapers: North Carolina", Afro-American Encyclopaedia, Mind and matter, Nashville: Haley & Florida, hdl:2027/inu.30000029292855, OCLC 219597043
- Ingram, John Van Ness (1912). "North Carolina". A Check List of American Eighteenth Century Newspapers in the Library of Congress.
- Johnson, Guion Griffis (1937). "Newspaper And Periodical Press". Ante-Bellum North Carolina: A Social History. University of North Carolina Press – via Documenting the American South.
- Mammen, Edwin H. (2006). "North Carolina Newspapers". In Powell, William S. (ed.). Encyclopedia of North Carolina. University of North Carolina Press.
- North, S.N.D.; United States Department of the Interior (1884). "Catalogue of Periodical Publications: North Carolina". History and Present Condition of the Newspaper and Periodical Press of the United States. Washington, D.C.: Government Printing Office. OCLC 1850475. (+ List of titles 50+ years old)
- "North Carolina". American Newspaper Directory. New York: George P. Rowell. 1900. pp. 771+. hdl:2027/umn.31951002273861a – via HathiTrust.
- "North Carolina". American Newspaper Annual & Directory. Philadelphia: N. W. Ayer & Son. 1922. pp. 727+. hdl:2027/umn.31951001295695n.
- "North Carolina Newspaper Publishing Has Developed Into Important State Industry". E.S.C. Quarterly. 9. North Carolina Employment Security Commission. Winter–Spring 1951 – via North Carolina Digital Collections.
- Parker, Roy Jr. (1998), NC Newspaper History, North Carolina Press Foundation
- "United States: Directory: Press: North Carolina". Europa World Year Book 2004. Europa Publications. 2004. pp. 4530+. ISBN 1-85743-253-3.
- University of Florida. "North Carolina". NewspaperCat: Catalog of Digital Historical Newspapers. Gainesville.
- Weeks, Stephen B. (1891). Press of North Carolina in the 18th Century. Brooklyn, NY: Historical Printing Club.
- Wheeler, John Hill (1851). "Press of North Carolina". Historical Sketches of North Carolina: From 1584 to 1851. Philadelphia: Lippincott, Grambo and Co. pp. 112–116.
- Wheeler, John Hill, ed. (1874). "Press of North Carolina". Legislative Manual and Political Register of the State of North Carolina. Raleigh. p. 149.
