= Gleaner =

A gleaner (noun) is a person who engages in gleaning, utilizing crops and resources left behind in a harvest.

== Newspapers ==
- The Gleaner, a newspaper of record in Kingston, Jamaica, published by:
  - The Gleaner Company, a newspaper publishing enterprise in Jamaica
- The Daily Gleaner, a daily newspaper serving Fredericton, New Brunswick, and the upper Saint John River Valley in Canada
- Henderson Gleaner, a daily newspaper in Henderson, Kentucky, U.S.
- Alamance Gleaner, a newspaper which was based in Alamance County, North Carolina, U.S.
- Northeast News Gleaner, a weekly newspaper that served Northeast Philadelphia, U.S.

== Other uses ==
- Gleaners, a non-profit that helps feed the homeless in Jackson, Mississippi
- The Gleaners, a painting by Jean-François Millet
- The Gleaners (Lhermitte), painting
- The Gleaners (Breton painting)
- Gleaner Manufacturing Company, a manufacturer of combine harvesters
  - Gleaner A85, a combine harvester
  - Gleaner E, a combine harvester
- HMS Gleaner (1809), a mercantile ketch
- HMS Gleaner (J83), a survey vessel launched in 1937 and converted into a minesweeper in 1939
- HMSML Gleaner (H86), a survey motor launch in commission since 1983
- The Gleaners (album) by Larry Grenadier
- La Spigolatrice ("The Gleaner)"), a controversial statue installed in 2021 in Sapri, Italy
- Les Glaneurs et La Glaneuse (2000), (The Gleaners and I), a documentary by Agnès Varda

== See also ==
- Glean (disambiguation)
- Gleaner Heights, in the South Shetland Islands, Antarctica
- HMS Gleaner, a list of ships of the British Royal Navy
- The Gleaners and I, a French documentary film
