= Edinburgh Channels =

The Edinburgh Channels, formerly a single channel known as the Bullock Channel and then the Duke of Edinburgh Channel are two roughly parallel transverse channels in the Thames Estuary. They used to be important for navigation, providing a deep approach to the River Thames from the south-east through the sandbanks of the estuary. The opening of an alternative channel in 2000 has greatly reduced their use, but having been surveyed and studied extensively over the past two centuries they provide an important example of the processes that shape shallow water landforms.

== Background ==
The Thames Estuary and the adjacent part of the North Sea is an area of shallow water with many sandbanks and channels, and substantial tidal currents, often 2-2.5 knots at springs. On the flood, the main tidal flow comes from the north, and then passes in a south-westerly direction towards the river mouth. It is the scouring action of this current that determines the main pattern of banks and channels, which run in a SW -NE direction. A secondary tidal current arrives from the Strait of Dover 2-3 hours after the peak of the main flow. This current passes into the estuary from the south-east, and has cut several transverse channels or swatchways, across the banks, including the Edinburgh Channels. On the ebb tide the pattern is reversed with similar speeds and timings.

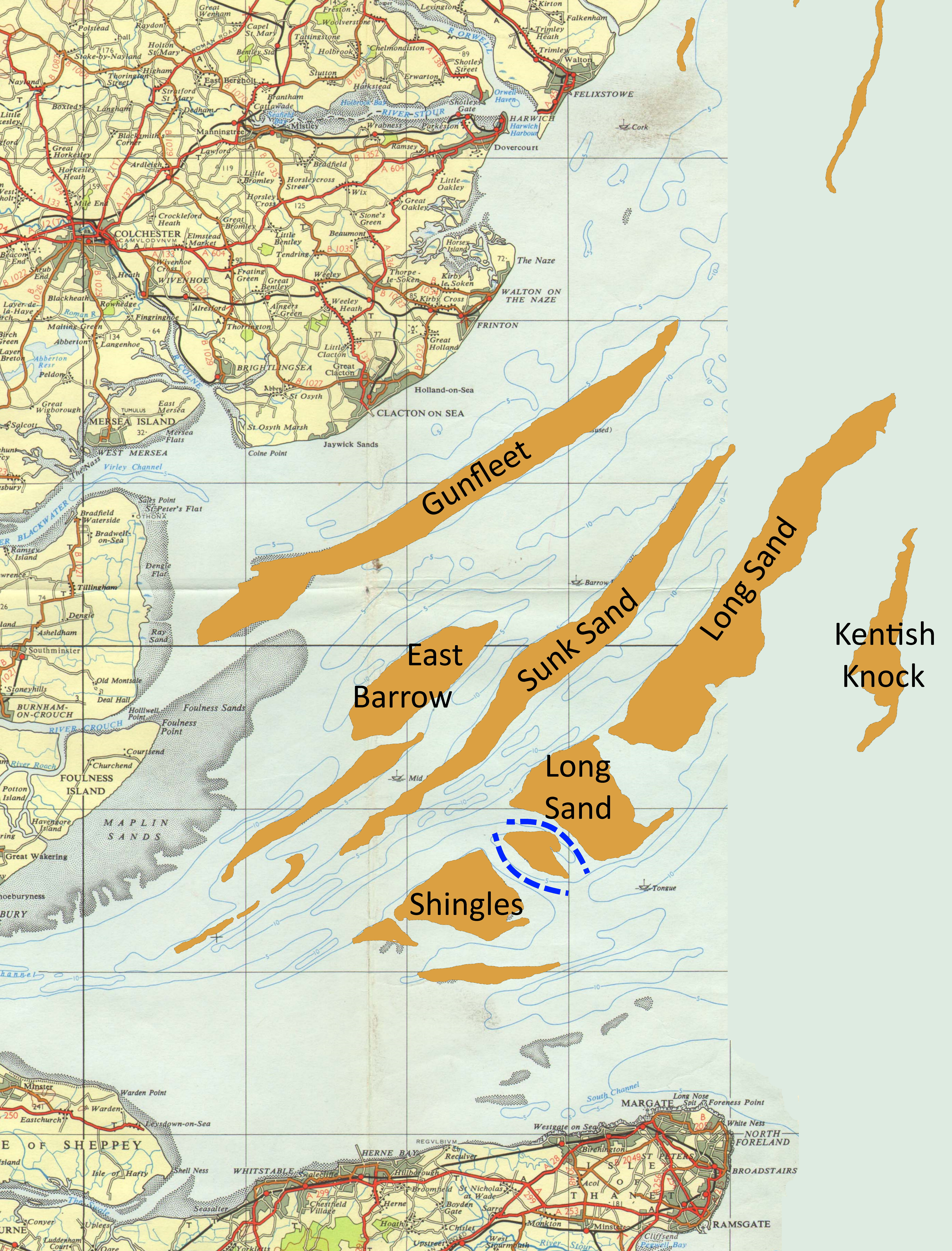
The main sandbanks of the Thames estuary, about 1953. The dashed lines between Long Sand and Shingles indicate the Edinburgh Channels

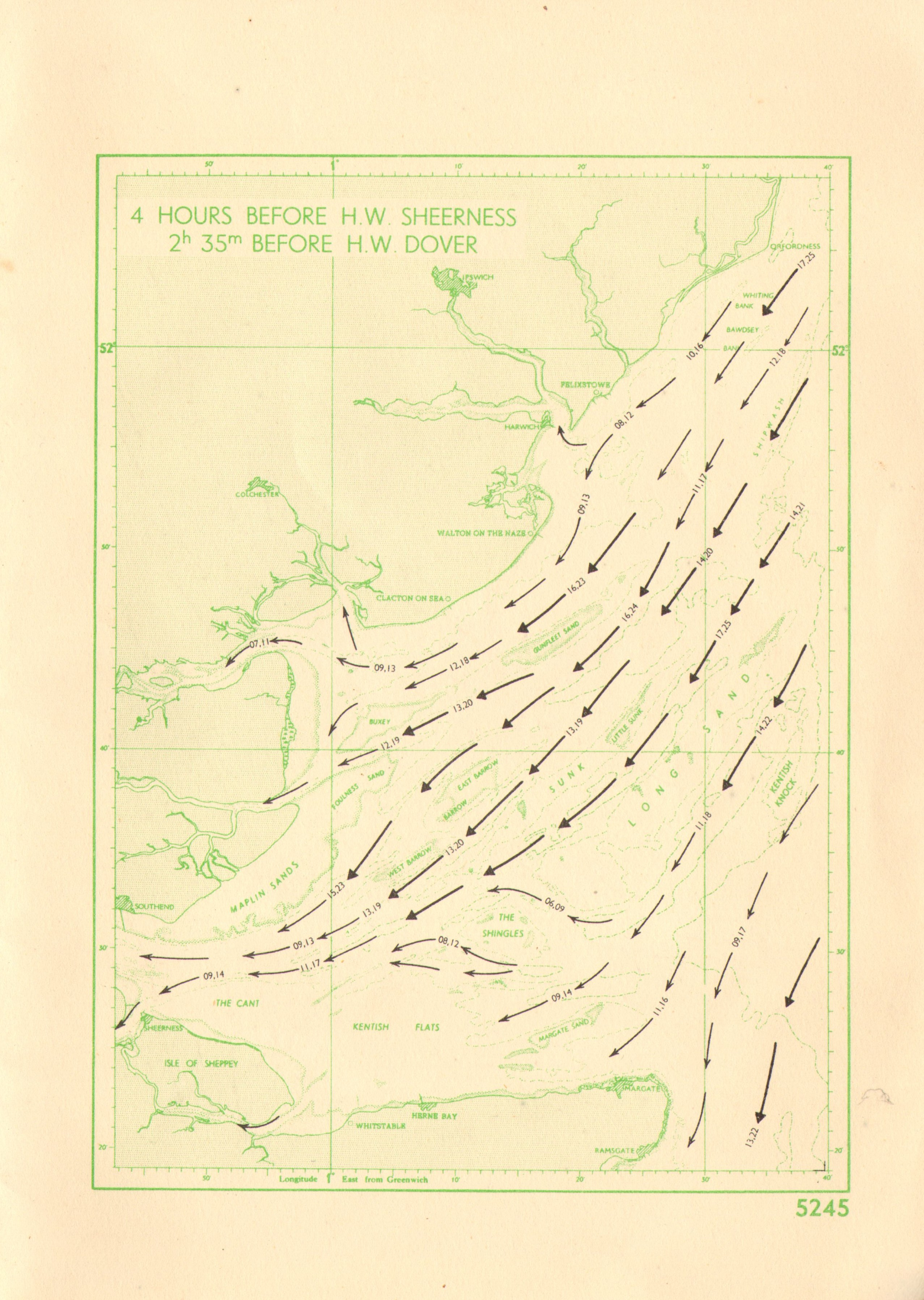
The main tidal flow from the north, flood tide.

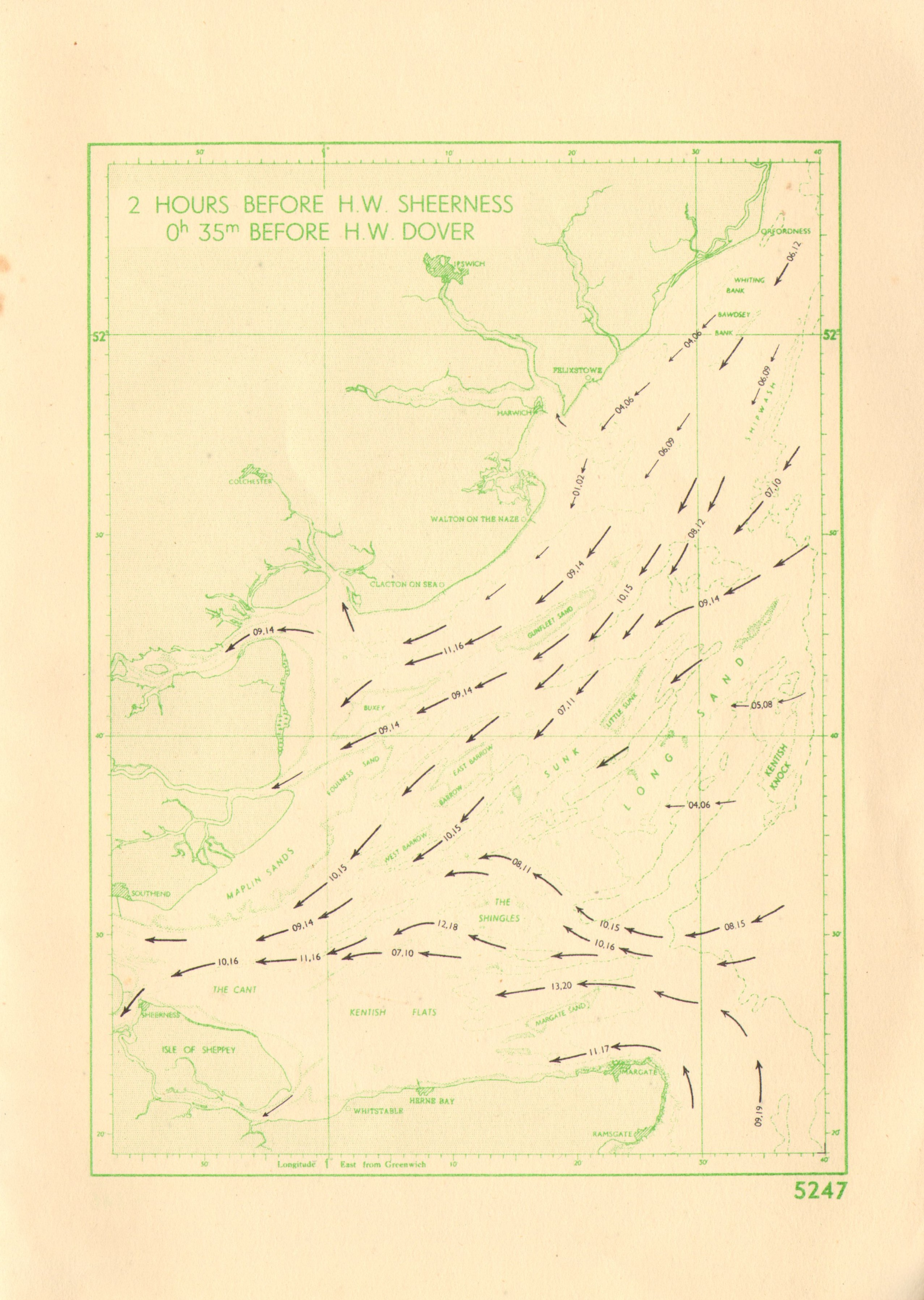
The secondary tidal flow from the south, two hours later, flood tide.

== History ==
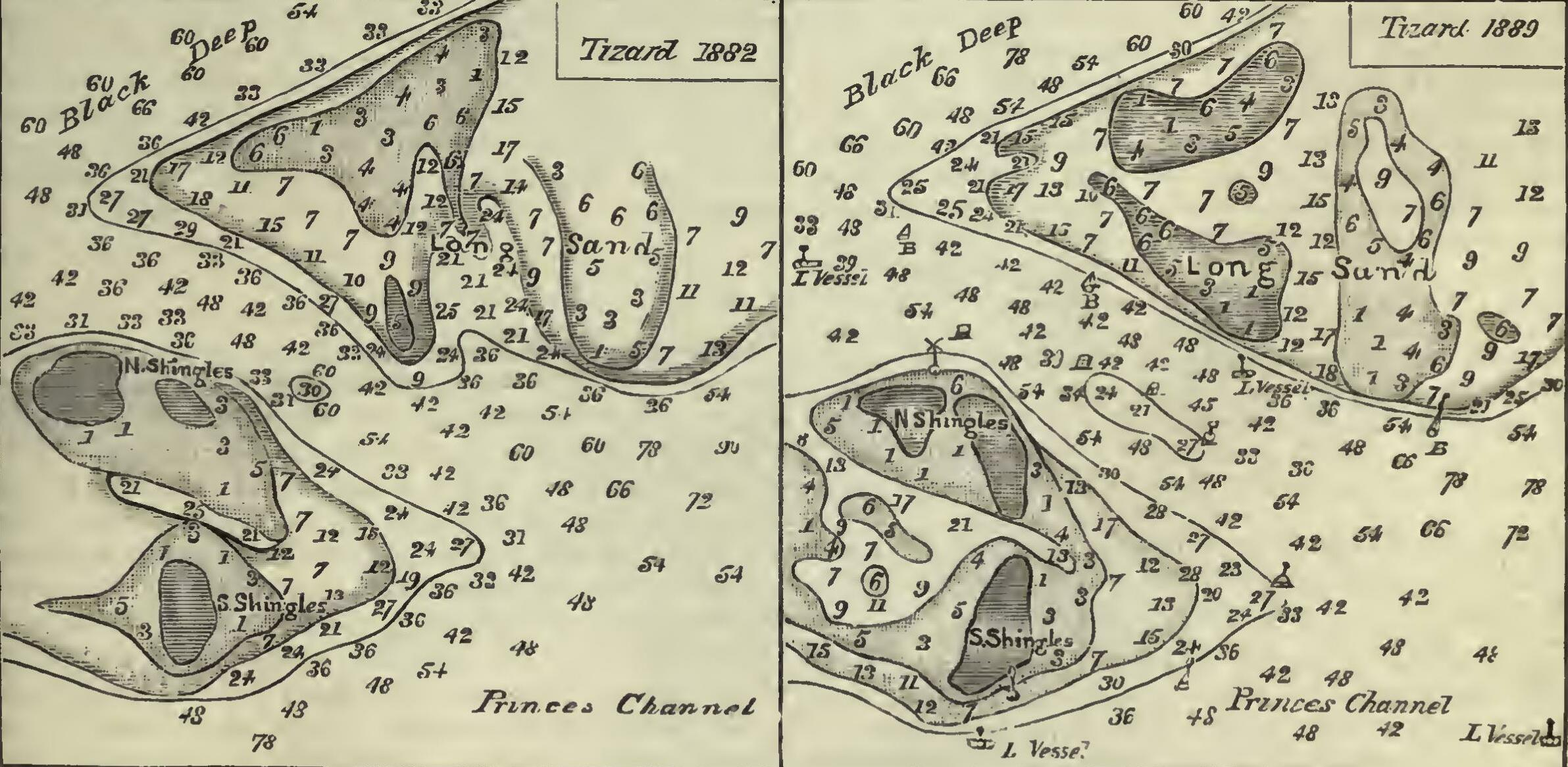
The development of the patch in the middle of the Duke of Edinburgh Channel between 1882and 1889. Depths in feet.

Thomas Henry Tizard, surveyor and oceanographer, has presented an account of the changes in the area from the survey by George Thomas in 1810 to his own work in 1882 and 1889. In 1810 there was a channel with 30 foot depth known as Thomas's New Channel, and an inlet to the south-west of it. When surveyed by Frederick Bullock in 1839, Thomas's channel had narrowed and shoaled, but the inlet noted by Thomas had opened into a new channel with 18 feet depth, which was named Bullock's channel. The next survey in 1862, by Edward Calver, showed that Bullock's Channel had deepened and widened, with a depth of 42 feet, but that Thomas's channel had completely closed. Tizard's first survey was in 1882 in connection with the marking of the channel by buoys. At this time the channel was renamed the Duke of Edinburgh Channel in honour of Prince Alfred, Master of Trinity House. Tizard noted the presence of a shallower patch, with a depth of 30 feet, near the centre of the channel. The channel was lighted in 1889, with two lightships and three gas-lighted buoys. Tizard noted 1n 1889 that the patch had become shallower, and was about a mile in length.

Admiralty Chart No 1605 Edinburgh Channels, published 1932

In the mid-nineteenth century, most shipping into the Thames from the south-east used the Princes and Alexandra Channels, to the south of Shingles. As vessels became larger and with deeper draught these channels became insufficient, and the Duke of Edinburgh Channel became increasingly important. The patch in the middle, now known as Shingles Patch, became larger and shallower, and by 1910 had divided the channel into two, now known as the North and South Edinburgh channels, both being used for navigation. By 1933 Shingles Patch had shoaled sufficiently that part of it dried at low water, and it had also shifted north, causing the north channel to become narrower.

Fisherman's Gat, a swatchway to the north-east of the Edinburgh Channels, became steadily deeper from the 1950s on, making it increasingly attractive as an alternative to the Edinburgh Channels. It was buoyed and opened to shipping in 2000.

== Current status ==
The Edinburgh channels are now unmarked, and no longer used by commercial shipping, but are still used by smaller craft.
