= Upland Britain =

A topographic map of Great Britain and Ireland showing the British uplands.

Upland Britain refers to a semi-natural habitat of the British Isles, generally above 1,000 feet (300 m), including:

- Brecon Beacons, in southern Wales
- Black Mountains, in southern Wales
- Cambrian Mountains, in mid Wales
- Snowdonia, in northern Wales
- Dartmoor, in southwestern England
- Exmoor, in southwestern England
- Pennines, in northern England
- North York Moors, in northern England
- Northwest Highlands, in northern Scotland
- Grampian Mountains
- Southern Uplands, in southern Scotland

== See also ==
- Millward, R.; Robinson, A.H.W. (1980). Upland Britain. David & Charles. ISBN 0-7153-7823-6.
