= HMS Gleaner =

HMS Gleaner or HMSML Gleaner has been the name of more than one ship of the Royal Navy of the United Kingdom, and may refer to:

- HMS Gleaner (1809), a mercantile ketch launched in 1802, hired in 1808, purchased in 1809, and lost in 1814
- HMS Gulnare (1833), a gunvessel launched in 1833, renamed HMS Gleaner in 1838, and scrapped in 1849
- HMS Gleaner (1854), a gunboat launched in 1854 and sold in 1868
- HMS Gleaner (1890), a torpedo gunboat launched in 1890 and sold in 1905
- HMS Gleaner (1906), a tender acquired in 1906 and sold in 1921
- HMS Gleaner (J83), a survey vessel launched in 1937, converted into a minesweeper in 1939, and sold in 1950
- HMSML Gleaner (H86), a survey motor launch in commission from 1983 to 2018
