= Hillsborough Recorder =

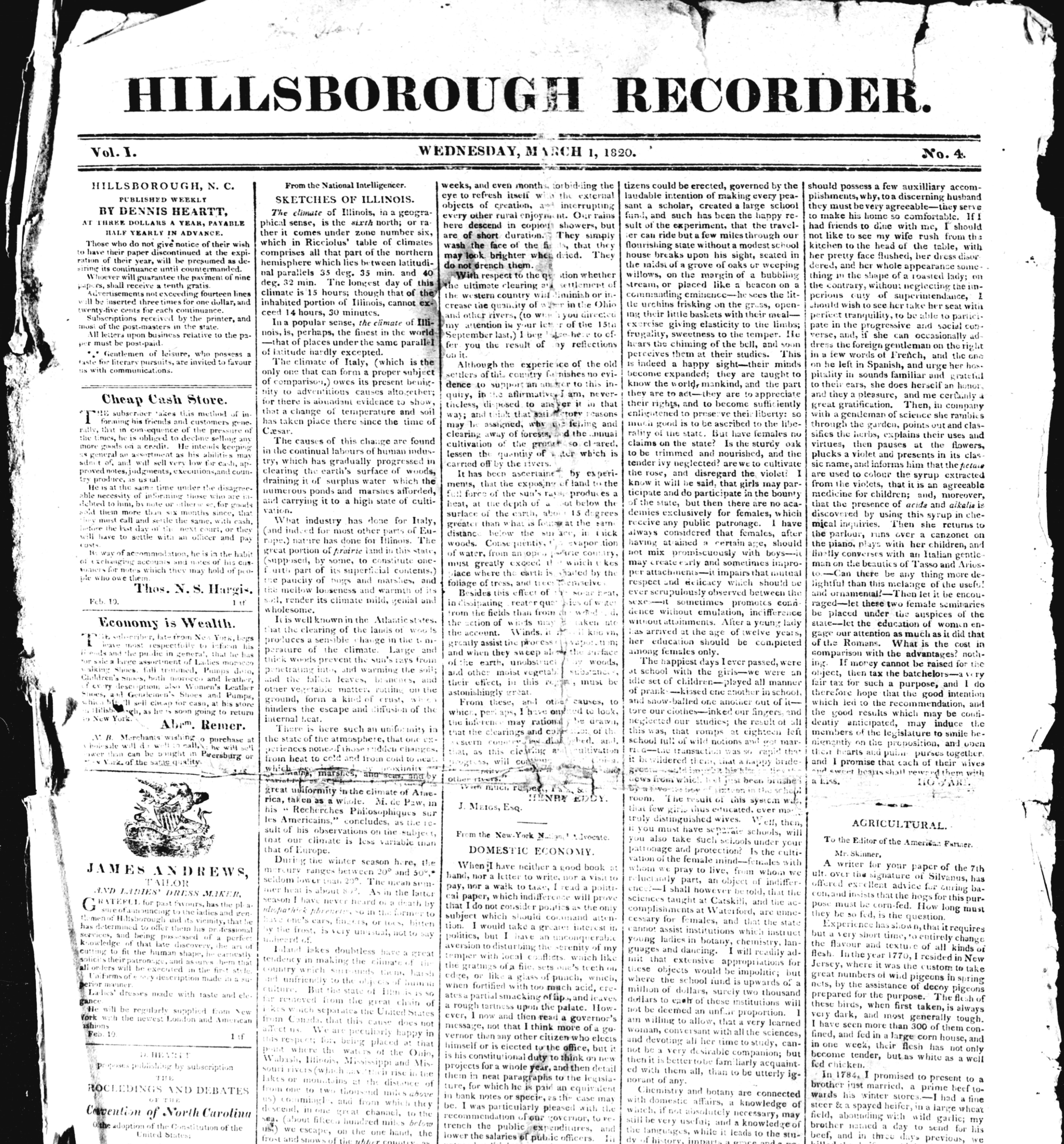
- Hillsborough Recorder front page from March 1, 1820
- Type: Weekly newspaper
- Founder: Dennis Heartt
- Founded: February 1820
- Ceased publication: March 1879
- Political alignment: Whig
- Language: American English
- Headquarters: Hillsborough
- City: Hillsborough
- Country: United States
- Readership: Orange County, North Carolina
- ISSN: 2475-160X
- OCLC number: 10454745
- Free online archives: chroniclingamerica.loc.gov/lccn/sn84026472/

The Hillsborough Recorder was established by Dennis Heartt in Hillsborough, North Carolina, in February 1820, with the first known edition of the newspaper being issued on March 1, 1820. At the time, there was no newspaper being published west of Raleigh, North Carolina’s capital.

The newspaper was published weekly, and from 1820 until at least 1827, the paper cost three dollars for a year's subscription.

Politically, it was a Whig-leaning paper, alongside the Raleigh Register, the Fayetteville Observer, the Carolina Watchman (printed in Salisbury), and the Greensborough Patriot.

The Hillsborough Recorder was widely read by the citizens Orange County as well as adjacent counties. The newspaper was a source of news for and about the politicians of North Carolina, provided practical suggestions for everyone from farmers to housewives, included writings by local authors and contributions copied from various other journals, contained news of local, national, and international interest, the proceedings of courts, and advertisements. The advertisements included such things as the sale of property (to include slaves), the wares stocked at local stores, and rewards for stolen or lost property.

Heartt published the newspaper for nearly fifty years, selling it in 1869 shortly before his death in May 1870. The paper was published in Hillsborough until March 1879, when it moved to Durham, North Carolina, and its title changed to the Durham Recorder.

After the newspaper moved to Durham and was renamed, a competing weekly, the Hillsboro Recorder, was published in Hillsborough by Parish & Strudwick from August 1887 to August 1888.

== See also ==
- List of newspapers in North Carolina
- List of defunct newspapers of North Carolina
