= Glean (disambiguation) =

Gleaning is a post-harvest agricultural process.

Glean may also refer to:

- Gleaning (birds), a feeding process in birds similar to the agricultural process
- Glean (album), a 2015 album by They Might Be Giants
- Glean, a 2004 album by Echobrain
- Carlyle Glean (born 1932), Grenadian politician
- Marion Patrick Jones (1934–2016), Trinidadian novelist also known as Marion Glean
- Glean Technologies, American technology company

== See also ==
- Gleaner (disambiguation)
