= Commerce (1791 ship) =

British merchant and whaling ship 1791–1805

History

Great Britain
- Name: Commerce
- Builder: Liverpool
- Launched: 1791
- Captured: 1797: Peru; 1805: Channel

General characteristics
- Tons burthen: 208, or 210 (bm)
- Complement: 1793: 30; 1796:24
- Armament: 1793:14 × 6-pounder guns; 1796: 4 × 6-pounder + 6 × 4-pounder guns + 1 swivel gun; 1805: 8 guns

Commerce was launched at Liverpool in 1791. She was initially a West Indiaman. New owners in 1795 sent Commerce to the southern whale fishery in 1796. The Spanish captured her in 1797, but by 1799 she had returned to British ownership. She then traded generally until a French privateer captured her in 1805.

== Career ==
Commerce first appeared in Lloyd's Register (LR) in 1791 with J.Conning, master, G. Slater, owner, and trade Liverpool–St Vincent. After the outbreak of war with France in 1793, Captain William Bosworth acquired a letter of marque on 24 October 1794.

In 1795 ownership of Commerce changed to Bolton & Co., and her new owners employed her as a whaler, sending her to the Pacific. Captain Welham Clarke acquired a letter of marque on 17 June 1796. Captain Clarke sailed from London on 27 June 1796, bound for Chile. (Note: George Thomas, who would in 1810 go on to be the Royal Navy's hydrographic surveyor for Home Waters, sailed as an apprentice. Later, he spoke of his adventures to William Mogg, his secretary from 1817 to 1821. In 1839 Mogg wrote his recollections of Thomas's recollections. According to Mogg, Commerce had wrecked some 18 months after leaving England. She had not. That does not mean that Thomas was not wrecked, but if so, it would have occurred on a vessel he sailed on after the Spanish captured Commerce (see below).) Commerce sailed for the Southern Fishery from Gravesend on 11 August 1796. On her way to the Pacific she stopped at Rio de Janeiro for water, refreshment, and calefaction.

Lloyd's List reported on 13 February 1798 that Commerce, Clark, master, was one of several British whalers that the Spanish had captured off the coasts of Chile and Peru. Spanish records have Commerce being taken at Pisco, Peru.

In a process that currently is obscure, Commerce had returned to British ownership by late 1798 or early 1799. She then traded between Britain and North America, the West Indies, Portugal, and Ireland. On 14 January 1804, sailing from Jamaica to London, Commerce was assisted (for unknown cause) in mid-Atlantic at 42°N 39°W by HMS Andromache, which believed she would put into Fayal, Azores. Later, Commerce lost her rudder in bad weather and was, with difficulty, assisted into Cove of Cork about 29 February by HMS Trompeuse, eventually reaching London on 2 April 1804.

== Fate ==
Lloyd's List reported on 5 April 1805 that Commerce, Whitaker, master, had been taken while sailing from Cork to London and taken into Calais, where she arrived before 26 March. Lloyd's Register for 1806 carried the annotation "capt." by her name. Her captor was the French privateer Glâneur. (Note: Glaneur was a lugger commissioned in 1804. Her first cruise, under Charles-Robert Cornu de Lassalle with 64 men and 16 guns, took place between 1804 and 1805. Her second, under Thomas Souville, took place in 1805. Her third took place between November 1805 and January 1806 under Charles-Robert Cornu de Lassalle. Her fourth cruise took place under Thomas Souville from February 1807. Her fifth cruise, between November 1807 to February 1808, took place under Léonard-Louis Merlière (or Merlier). Her last cruise, under Thomas Souville, took place from some time in 1808 until a British ship captured her on 30 November 1808.)

== Lloyd's Register ==
Year	Master	Owner	Trade	Source and notes
1791	J.Conning	Slater & Co.	Liverpool–St Vincent	LR
1793	J.Conning; W.Bosworth	Slater & Co. Js. Bolton	Liverpool–St Vincent; Liverpool–Dominica	LR
1796	Bosworth; W.Clark	Bolton & Co. P. Hurry	Liverpool–Dominica; London–South Seas	LR; repaired 1795
1799	Frizall	Bainbridge	London–Halifax, Nova Scotia	LR
1803	T.Wake; Whitaker	Bainbridge	London–Halifax	LR; damages repaired 1792, repairs 1795, good repair 1801, thorough repair 1802
1806	Whitaker	Bainridge	London–Lisbon	LR; damages repaired 1792, repairs 1795, good repair 1801, thorough repair 1802, damages repaired 1804; Annotated "capt."
