= HMS Magpie (H130) =

2018 inshore and coastal survey ship of the Royal Navy

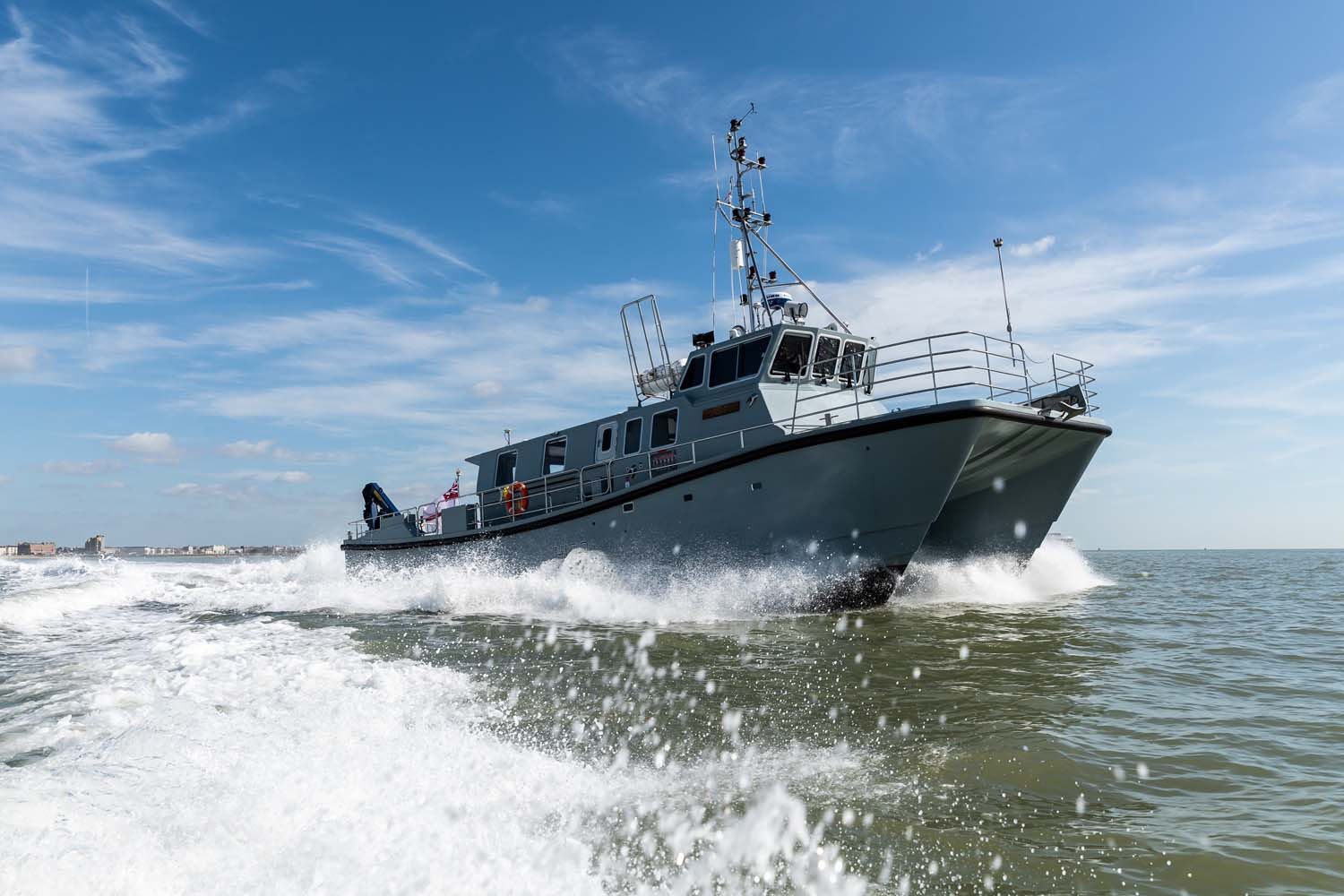
- Magpie sailing in HMNB Portsmouth

History

United Kingdom
- Name: HMS Magpie
- Operator: Royal Navy
- Ordered: 18 August 2017
- Builder: Safehaven Marine; Atlas Elektronik UK
- Laid down: September 2017
- Commissioned: 28 June 2018
- Home port: HMNB Devonport
- Identification: Pennant number: H130; MMSI number: 232015144
- Motto: Lux in Tenebris Lucet ("Light Shines into Darkness")
- Status: In service
- Badge: Original design created 1951 by Miss E Bulmer of Monkton Combe School

General characteristics
- Class & type: Sea-class 18 m inshore/coastal survey vessel
- Displacement: 37 tonnes
- Length: 18 m
- Beam: 6.2 m
- Draught: 1.4 m
- Propulsion: 2 × Yanmar 6AYEM diesel engines
- Speed: over 25 knots (46 km/h; 29 mph)
- Complement: 9

HMS Magpie is a survey ship of the Royal Navy, intended for use on inshore and coastal survey work. Magpie replaced HMS Gleaner. She was accepted by the RN in May 2018 and commissioned on 28 June 2018.

== History ==
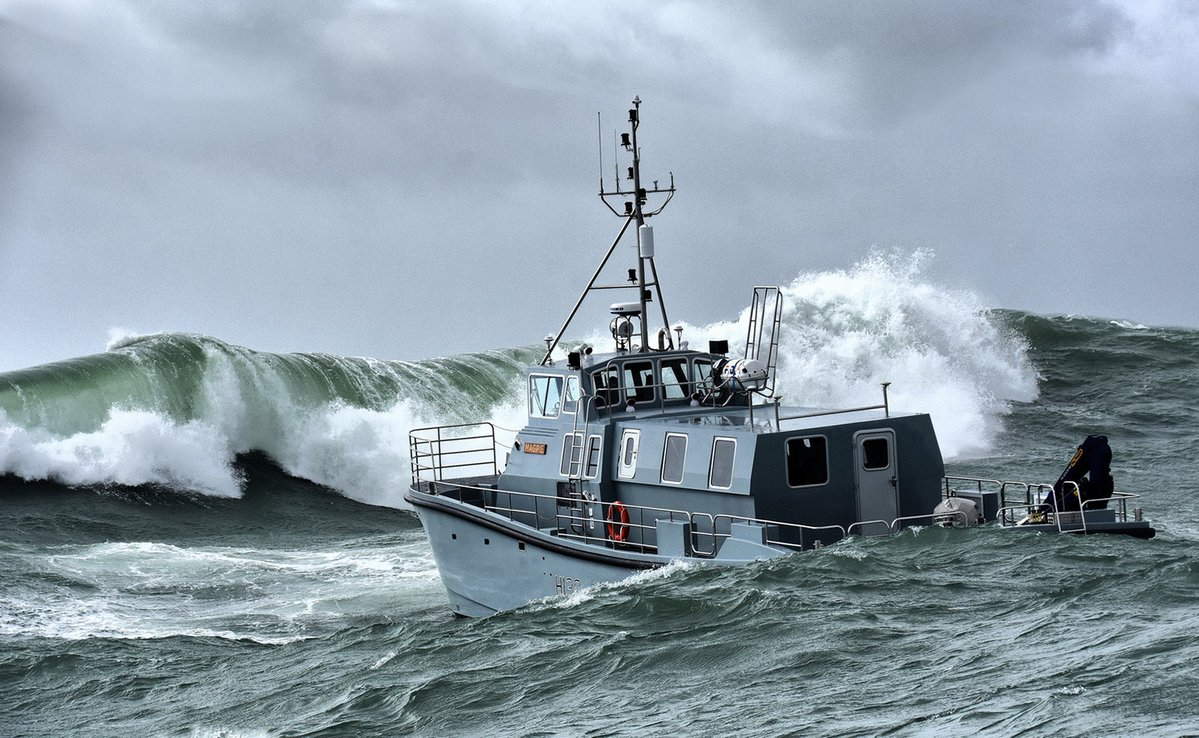
HMS Magpie undergoing sea trials

In August 2017, the replacement for HMS Gleaner, the Royal Navy's existing inshore survey launch, was announced to be one of a total of 38 multi-role workboats of various sizes being constructed to undertake various duties. The main structure of the vessel was constructed by Safehaven Marine, a boatbuilding company based in Cork. In February 2018, it was announced that the ship would be named HMS Magpie, the latest in a long line of Magpies dating back to 1806.

The type selected for the inshore survey vessel was based on Safehaven's Wildcat 60 catamaran design, the largest available at 18m in length, and with a displacement of 37 tonnes. Magpie was built to accommodate a crew of 12 for up to seven days, with the capability of operating in all weathers. Following completion and initial trials by Safehaven Marine, Magpie was delivered to Atlas Elektronik UK (AEUK) to install its mission equipment. In April 2018, Magpie underwent further trials with its mission equipment installed before final delivery of the vessel to the Royal Navy in May 2018 for commissioning in early summer 2018.

Magpie was procured under "Project Vahana", a programme to acquire up to 38 smaller boats in order to replace various Royal Navy vessels under 20 metres in length. The boats are known as the Sea-class and Magpie, at 18 metres in length, is the largest and only commissioned vessel in the series.

As Magpie is considerably larger than the vessel she replaced, the title of smallest commissioned vessel in the Royal Navy, which had belonged to Gleaner, initially passed to the two Scimitar-class patrol vessels and then to the Navy's new Cutlass-class fast patrol boats. Magpie is a significant improvement over Gleaner, both in terms of endurance and equipment – she features better on-board equipment than Gleaner, but is also designed for operating UUVs.

One of Magpie's first major tasks was a continuation of work done by her predecessor Gleaner in surveying Portsmouth Harbour to ensure the stability of the seabed in anticipation of Portsmouth's use by aircraft carriers Queen Elizabeth and Prince of Wales.

Once the work in Portsmouth harbour was complete, Magpie was tasked to survey the wreck site of the Mary Rose, Henry VIII's flagship, to search for anything of significance.

Work then focused on investigating the wreck of a French galley lost off the north-east coast of the Isle of Wight around the same time (1545) as the Mary Rose.

=== Magpie Badge ===
The magpie which features in the ship's badge was designed in 1951 by the art teacher at Monkton Combe School Junior School, Miss E Bulmer, as the icon for the school's Magpie Magazine. The icon was seen by the then Magpie Commander, who shared it with HRH Prince Philip, a previous Commander of the ship. Prince Philip supported its introduction as the official symbol of Magpie and it has been in use ever since. The school's relationship with Magpie resulted in it being given U82's ship's bell on its breakup in 1959, where it still hangs today. The School's magazine is still called The Magpie.
