= The Cary News =

Defunct newspaper in North Carolina

- The March 18, 2012 front page of The Cary News
- Type: Semi-weekly newspaper
- Format: Broadsheet
- Owner: The McClatchy Company
- Ceased publication: 2018
- Headquarters: 1100 Situs Court, Suite 100 Raleigh, North Carolina 27601; United States
- Circulation: 50,000 Daily
- Price: free
- Website: carynews.com

The Cary News was a local newspaper in Cary, North Carolina. It was established in 1969. Originally an independent newspaper, it was eventually purchased by The News & Observer.

It was published twice weekly and freely distributed for free to residents of Cary, North Carolina and Morrisville, North Carolina. In 2011, The Cary News won four awards from the North Carolina Press Association in the large community newspaper category for news reporting, sports columns, appearance and design, and photography. In 2009, the paper won for sports columns, features, and coverage as well as an award for multimedia. In 2008, the paper won awards from the NCPA for multimedia project, sports columns, sports coverage, and the website.

However, it eventually became an insert in The News & Observer rather than a stand-alone publication. In June 2017, The Cary News and the other nine community newspapers owned by The News & Observer were refocused on food, dining, and general area news rather than community-specific reporting. As of January 2018, the community newspapers were no longer being published.

== See also ==
- List of newspapers in North Carolina
- List of defunct newspapers of North Carolina
