= Penny Abernathy =

American journalist (born 1951)

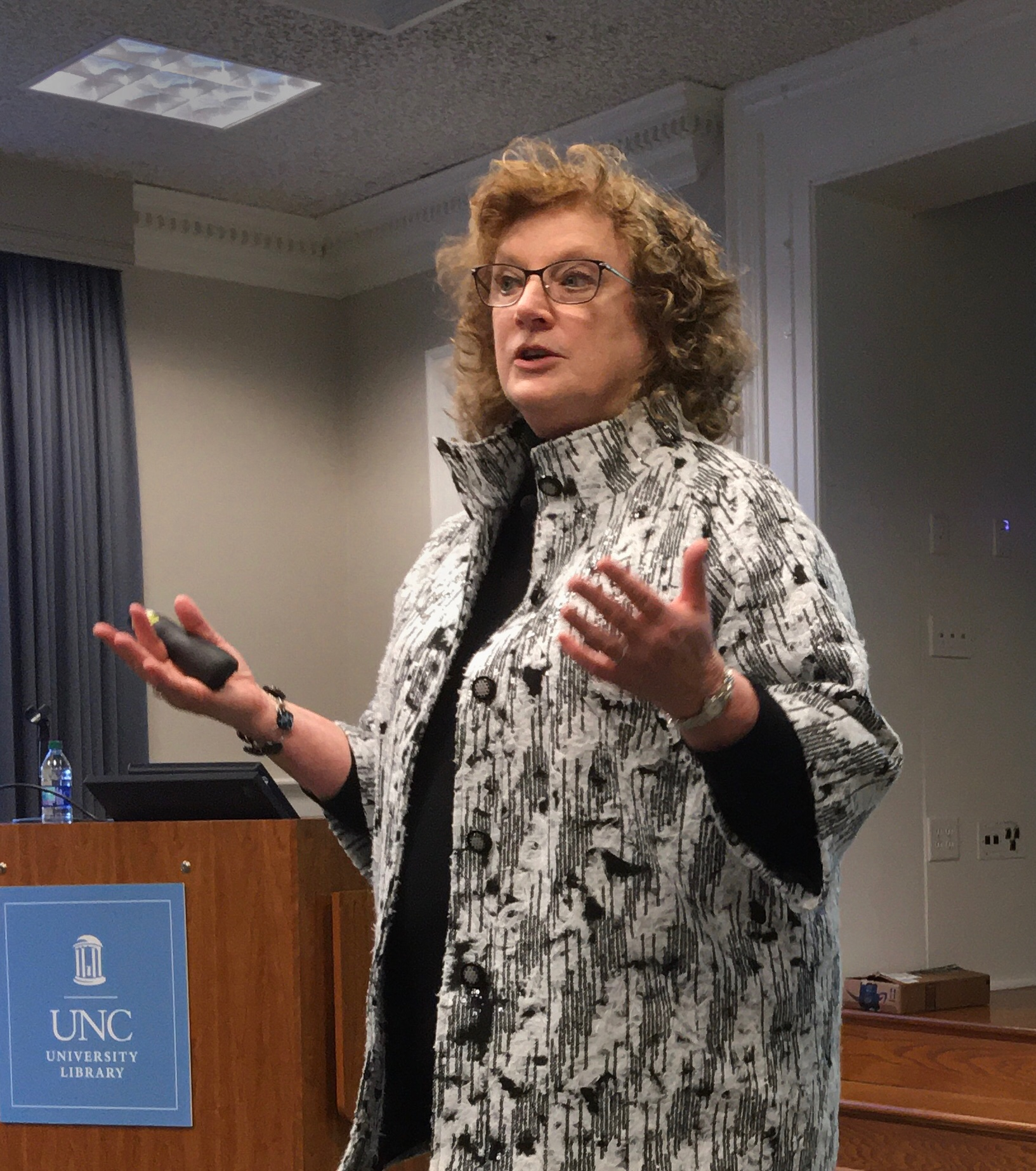
- Abernathy in 2020

Personal details
- Born: August 28, 1951 (age 74)
- Education: University of North Carolina at Greensboro (BA); Columbia University (MBA, MS)
- Occupation: Journalist; Professor
- Website: hussman.unc.edu/directory/faculty/penny-abernathy

Penelope Muse Abernathy (born August 28, 1951) is an American journalist, former media executive, author and researcher who specializes in the study of news deserts. In 2008, after senior management roles at The New York Times and The Wall Street Journal, she became the Knight Chair in Journalism and Digital Media Economics at the Hussman School of Journalism and Media at the University of North Carolina at Chapel Hill. In 2021, she was appointed a visiting professor at Northwestern University's Medill School of Journalism.

== Education ==
Abernathy received a bachelor's degree in history with a secondary emphasis in English literature and journalism from the University of North Carolina at Greensboro in 1973. She earned her M.B.A. from Columbia University in 1985 and a master's degree in journalism in 2003.

== Career ==
Early in her career, Abernathy was the editorial assistant to Roy Parker Jr., the editor of The Fayetteville Times. Between 1973 and 1984, she worked as a reporter and editor at various newspapers such as The Charlotte Observer, The Dallas Times-Herald, and The Wichita Eagle-Beacon.

From 1986 to 1999, Abernathy held several positions with The New York Times. She was the senior vice-president strategic planning and human resources, which made her responsible for planning a number of major business initiatives that included the nationwide delivery of the paper that began in 1997. In 1998, Abernathy became president of the newly created News Services Division, which oversaw development of a new media division, as well as syndication and licensing.

Abernathy was publisher of the Harvard Business Review between 1999 and 2002.

She joined The Wall Street Journal in 2003 and, as senior vice president was responsible for the business operations of the newspaper's international publications and for planning major U.S. initiatives, such as the launch of weekend edition in 2005.

Abernathy is currently a visiting professor at the Medill School, Northwestern University and previously was Knight Chair in Journalism and Digital Media Economics at the Hussman School of Journalism and Media at the University of North Carolina at Chapel Hill.

She was inducted into the North Carolina Media and Journalism Hall of Fame in 1998 and received the Alumni Professional Achievement Award from UNC at Greensboro in 2023.

=== Research ===
Abernathy's research has focused on the impact of news deserts and the development of business models that would help to sustain community journalism. Between 2014 and 2023, she was the author or co-author of two books and six reports that explored the state of local news, including the decline of local newspapers, the implications for communities and democracy, and solutions for halting the rise of news deserts.

Abernathy has also examined how ownership of newspapers by investment groups, including private equity and hedge funds, has contributed to the rise of news deserts and ghost newspapers while diminishing local accountability and transparency for both news organizations and elected officials.

== Publications ==
Saving Community Journalism: The Path to Profitability was published in 2014. The book was based on five years of research involving more than two dozen newspapers, and it was designed to help stakeholders implement new strategies for long-term profitability. The research in this book became the foundation for the UNC Center for Innovation and Sustainability in Local Media.

Abernathy co-authored "The Strategic Digital Media Entrepreneur," published in 2018, which focused on how the Internet has changed business models in the media; leadership challenges and opportunities that face media entrepreneurs; and help to develop strategies to create new and sustainable business models.

Abernathy authored or co-authored six reports exploring the political, social and economic consequences resulting from the loss of local news:

- "The Rise of a New Media Baron and the Emerging Threat of News Deserts" published by UNC Center for Innovation & Sustainability in Local Media (CISLM) in 2016.
- “Thwarting the Emergence of News Deserts” published by UNC CISLM in 2017.
- “The Expanding News Desert” published by UNC CISLM in 2018.
- “News Deserts and Ghost Newspapers: Will Local News Survive?” published by UNC CISLM in 2020.
- The State of Local News 2022 published by Northwestern University's Local News Initiative (LNI)
- The State of Local News Report 2023 published by Northwestern University's LNI.
