= Adrian Henry Wardle Robinson =

British geographer (1925–2018)

Adrian Henry Wardle Robinson (12 June 1925 – 22 November 2018) was a British geographer noted for his work on shallow water oceanography and on the history of marine surveying.

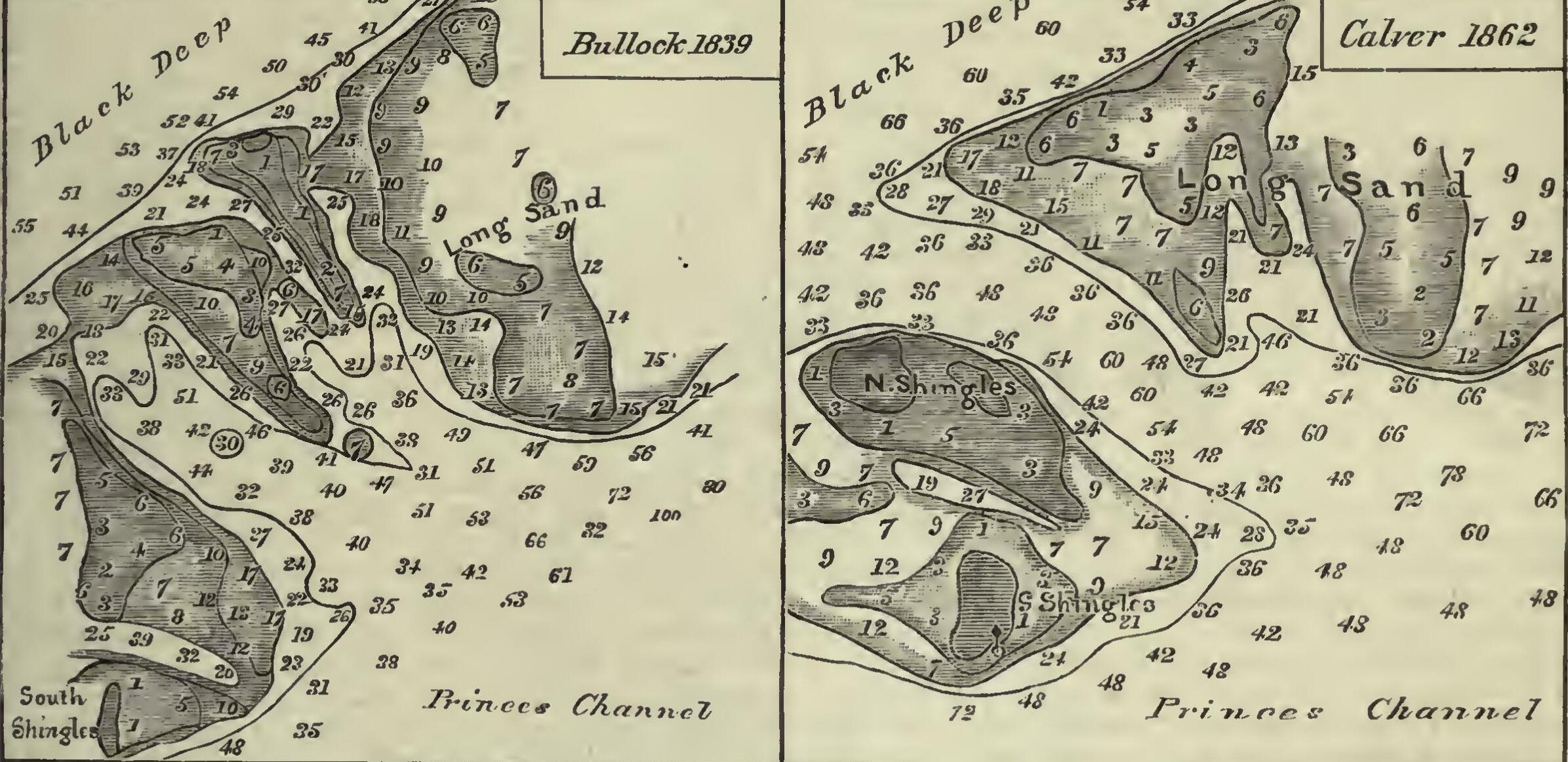
Changes in the Edinburgh Channel in the Thames Estuary between 1839 and 1862. Plans from Tizard (1890) discussed by Robinson in his 1946 paper. The changes continued. The Edinburgh Channel became the Edinburgh Channels when a shoal, Shingles Patch, developed in the middle and divided it in two.

Robinson became a fellow of the Royal Geographical Society in 1945. He then worked as a cartographer in the Hydrographic Office of the Admiralty. In 1946 he prepared a paper describing the changes in the channels and sandbanks of the Thames Estuary, work which foreshadowed his interests in shallow water oceanography and the history of hydrography.

Robinson obtained an MSc at London University in 1952. He worked at the University of Leicester, as lecturer in Geography. from 1952. He received his PhD, also from London, in 1960, and became reader at Leicester in 1969. He carried out considerable research into the factors affecting coasts and shallow waters, particularly in sandy bays and estuaries, and in harbour entrances. He was also occupied with the history of marine surveying and cartography of Britain, publishing several journal articles as well as his highly regarded book Marine Cartography in Britain, with many maps and diagrams by his wife, Gwyneth, herself a former cartographer. During the 1970s, Robinson collaborated with Roy Millward, also of the University of Leicester, in a series of books on the Landscapes of Britain, as well as on The Shell Book of the British Coast (1983), again with maps prepared by Gwyneth Robinson . He was an industrial consultant on coastal and seabed issues.

== Selected bibliography ==
- Robinson, A.H.W. (1951). "The early hydrographic surveys of the British Isles". Empire Survey Review. 11 (80): 60–65. doi:10.1179/sre.1951.11.80.60.
- —— (1951). "The Changing Navigation Routes of the Thames Estuary". The Journal of Navigation. 4 (04): 357–370. doi:10.1017/S0373463300034226. S2CID 128834341.
- —— (1952). "The Evolution of the English Nautical Chart". Journal of Navigation. 5 (4): 362–374. doi:10.1017/S0373463300045070. S2CID 128544262.
- —— (1953). "Some hydrographic surveyors of the early nineteenth century". Empire Survey Review. 12 (90): 146–152. doi:10.1179/sre.1953.12.90.146.
- —— (1955). "The Harbour Entrances of Poole, Christchurch and Pagham". The Geographical Journal. 121 (1): 33–50. doi:10.2307/1791805. JSTOR 1791805.
- —— (1956). "The Submarine Morphology of certain Port Approach Channel Systems". The Journal of Navigation. 9 (1): 20–46. doi:10.1017/S0373463300046749. S2CID 128405296.
- —— (1957). "Marine Surveying in Britain during the Seventeenth and Eighteenth Centuries". The Geographical Journal. 123 (4): 449–456. doi:10.2307/1790346. JSTOR 1790346.
- —— (1958). "The charting of the Scottish coasts". Scottish Geographical Magazine. 74 (2): 116–127. doi:10.1080/00369225808735714.
- —— (1959). "Two unrecorded manuscript charts by John Adair". Scottish Geographical Magazine. 75 (3): 169–172. doi:10.1080/00369225908735762.
- —— (1960). "Ebb-flood channel systems in sandy bays and estuaries". Geography. 45 (3): 183–199. JSTOR 40565158.
- —— (1961). "The Hydrography of Start Bay and Its Relationship to Beach Changes at Hallsands". The Geographical Journal. 127 (1): 63–77. doi:10.2307/1793197. JSTOR 1793197. OCLC 62431872.
- —— (1962). Marine Cartography in Britain: A History of the Sea Chart to 1855. Leicester University Press. OCLC 62431872.
- —— (1964). "The inshore waters, sediment supply and coastal changes of part of Lincolnshire". East Midland Geographer. 3 (22): 307–322.
- —— (1965). "The Mapping of Hydrographic Data in Atlases - Plea for Morphological Maps". The International Hydrographic Review. 42 (1).
- —— (1966). "Residual currents in relation to shoreline evolution of the East Anglian coast". Marine Geology. 4 (1): 57–84. doi:10.1016/0025-3227(66)90037-5.
- —— (1968). "The use of the sea bed drifter in coastal studies with particular reference to the Humber". Zeitschrift für Geomorphologie. 7: 1–23.
- —— (1968). "The Submerged Glacial Landscape off the Lincolnshire Coast". Transactions of the Institute of British Geographers (44): 119–132. doi:10.2307/621752. JSTOR 621752.
- ——; Wallwork, Kenneth L. (1970). Map Studies with Related Field Excursions. Longman. ISBN 978-0-58-231067-4.
- Millward, Roy; Robinson, Adrian. Landscapes of Britain series: The Lake District (1970); South East England - Thameside and the Weald (1971); The West Midlands (1971); The South - West Peninsula (1971); The Welsh Marches (1971); Cumbria (1972) South East England - the channel coastlands (1973); The Low Weald and Downs (1973); The Peak District (1975); The Welsh Borders (1978); Landscapes of North Wales (1978); Upland Britain (1980).
- Millward, Roy; Robinson, Adrian (1983). The Shell Book of the British Coast. David & Charles. ISBN 978-0-71-538150-2.
