= Frederick Bullock (Royal Navy officer) =

Admiral Frederick Bullock FRGS
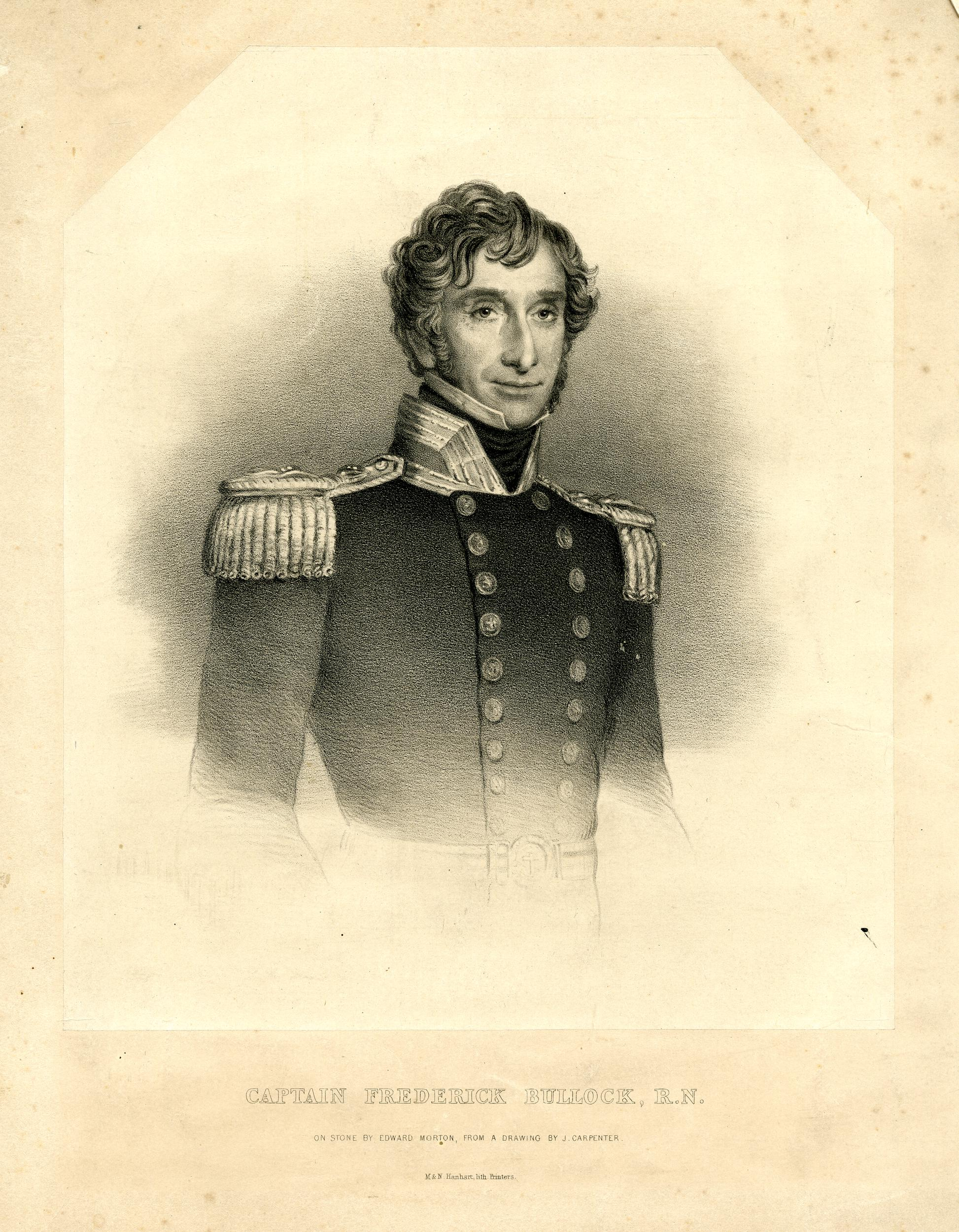
- Born: 1788
- Died: 6 February 1874
- Military career
- Allegiance: United Kingdom
- Branch: Royal Navy
- Service years: 1804-1853
- Rank: Admiral
- Awards: Fellow of the Royal Geographical Society

Admiral Frederick Bullock (1788 – 6 February 1874) was a Royal Navy officer noted for his work as a surveyor, particularly in the Thames Estuary.

Bullock entered the Navy on 28 November 1804, serving in HMS Indefatigable under Captains Moore and Rodd in the English Channel. From 1808 he was with HMS Fame in the Mediterranean. He was promoted to Lieutenant on 22 January 1812.

Bullock's first command was HMS Snap, from 1823, surveying the coast of Newfoundland, determining the precise positions of the many headlands that had been well charted by James Cook, but without the aid of chronometers. He then commanded HMS Echo from 1827 to 1828, surveying in the River Thames. He was promoted to commander in 1829, and served on the yacht William and Mary, on HMS Boxer, and HMS Fearless. He became a Fellow of the Royal Geographical Society in 1830. As commander of Fearless, Bullock was part of the squadron that accompanied Queen Victoria to and from Woolwich on her 1842 visit to Scotland.

Bullock is best-remembered for his surveying of the River Thames and its estuary. A letter from Bullock to Parry, Hydrographer of the Navy in 1828 proposing a detailed survey was rebuffed, but when Francis Beaufort became Hydrographer in 1829 he was much more supportive. Bullock would be engaged on this work until 1847. He started in London, and worked his way down river, using triangulation which connected with the earlier work of the Ordnance Survey. As he moved into the outer estuary, which had been surveyed by Graeme Spence and George Thomas, it became clear that there had been many changes in the shoals and channels, and a new survey of this area was authorised. To obtain accurate positions of shoals and banks out of sight of land, he set up a network of semi-permanent beacons as well as anchored vessels for triangulation, a development of the method earlier used by Thomas.

The changes in the banks and channels of the outer estuary noted by Bullock have continued. In 1839 Bullock surveyed a channel which was named the Bullock Channel. Tizard (1890) reviewed a number of surveys of this channel, including Bullock's and his own. By 1882 it had become wider and deeper, and was buoyed and renamed the Duke of Edinburgh Channel after Alfred, Duke of Saxe-Coburg and Gotha and of Edinburgh, Master of Trinity House. Since that time a shoal has developed that has divided the channel into two, now known as the Edinburgh Channels.

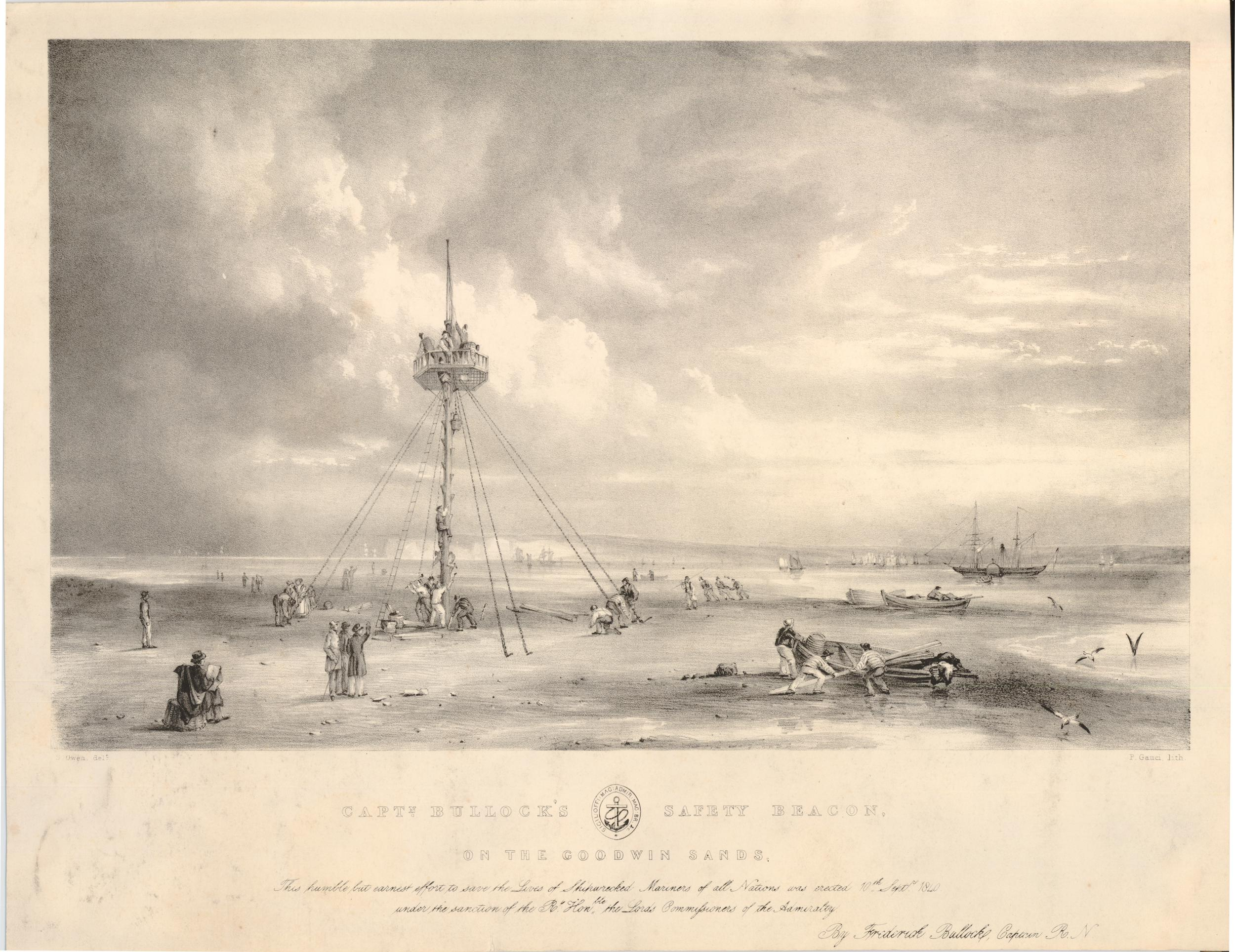
Bullock's safety beacon on the Goodwin sands

Bullock made a number of technical innovations. On the basis of the temporary beacons he had used in surveying, he designed a more permanent safety beacon which was set up on the dangerous Goodwin Sands, off the Kent coast. In December 1842, during a royal visit to Walmer Castle, Bullmer took Prince Albert in Fearless to visit the beacon. The beacon survived four stormy winters before being demolished by a "careless dutchman" whose ship ran over it at high tide. Bullock was the inventor of an improved form of protractor, and patented a ship's log, for recording a vessel's speed

Bullock retired in 1853, along with several other surveyors, as a result of budget cuts. He was promoted to admiral on the retired list, and died on 6 February 1874.
