= HMS Trompeuse (1800) =

Sloop of the Royal Navy

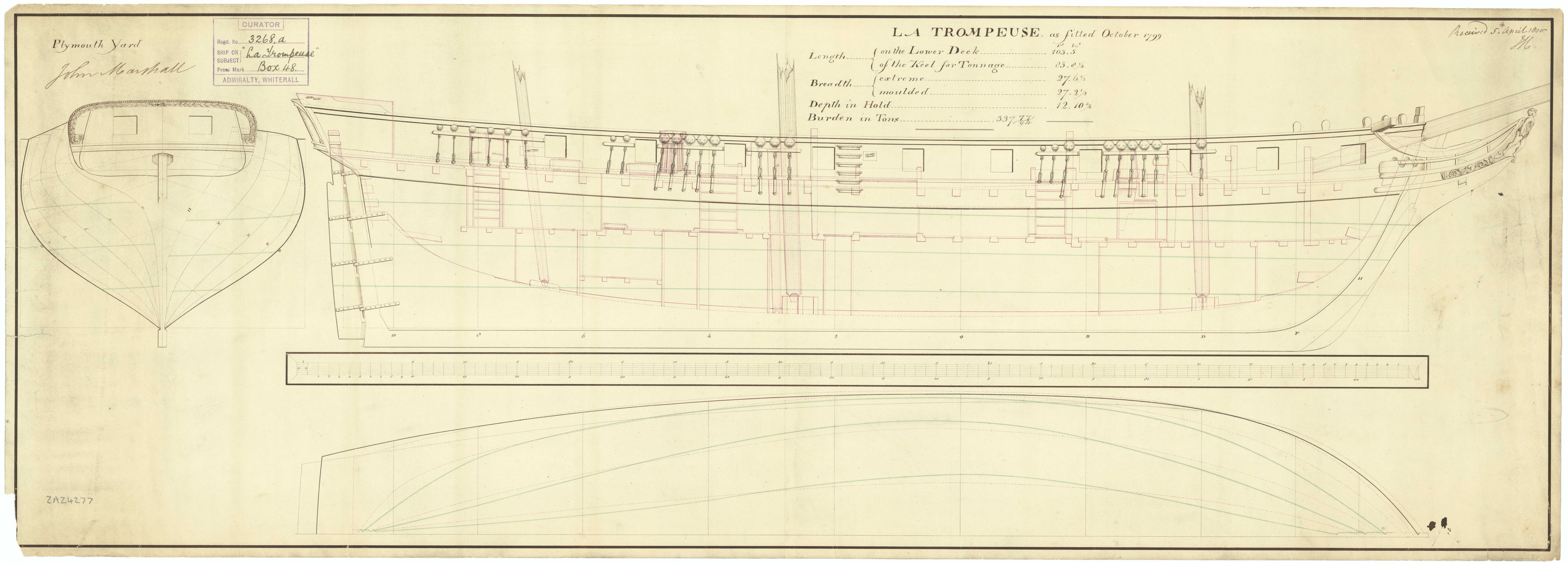
- Trompeuse

History

France
- Builder: Nantes
- Commissioned: 1797
- Captured: 4 March 1800

Great Britain
- Name: HMS Trompeuse
- Acquired: 1800 by purchase of a prize
- Fate: Sold in 1811 for breaking up

General characteristics
- Tons burthen: 38048/94 (bm)
- Length: Overall:100 ft 10 in (30.7 m); Keel:80 ft 4 1/2 in (24.5 m)
- Beam: 29 ft 10 in (9.1 m)
- Depth of hold: 13 ft 1 3/4 in (4.0 m)

HMS Trompeuse was the French privateer brig Coureur that the British Royal Navy captured in 1800. She was sold for breaking up in 1811.

== French brig ==
The origins of HMS Trompeuse are subject to some confusion. Two reputable sources state that she was the privateer brig Trompeuse that HMS Révolutionnaire captured on 4 March 1800. However, on that date Révolutionnaire captured the privateer Coureur.

Coureur or Courier was a privateer commissioned in Nantes in 1797 under Pierre Arnoux, with 150 men and 10 guns.

When captured, Coureur was pierced for 18 cannon but carried ten 6-pounder guns and four carronades; she had a crew of 158 men. She was 20 days out of Nantes on her first cruise and had captured "His Majesty's Ship" Princess Royal, which had been sailing to Tortola. The captain and most of the crew of Princess Royal were on board Coureur. (Note: Princess Royal was a Post Office Packet Service packet ship returning from the Leeward Islands.) Captain T. Twysden of Revolutionnaire described Coureur as being "quite new,..., Copper-bottomed, and sails delightfully." Revolutionnaire brought Couriere into Cork.

== Royal Navy ==
Coureur arrived at Plymouth on 21 May 1800 and was laid up. She then underwent fitting in July to August 1803, Commander Matthew Godwin having commissioned her as HMS Trompeuse on 23 June 1803, for the Irish Station. He then cruised off the south-west coast of Ireland until 30 September 1804. (He had been promoted to post captain on 8 May.) In February 1804, in boisterous seas, Trompeuse assisted the British ship Commerce after she lost her rudder and, with difficulty, brought her into Cove of Cork.

Commander John Shortland replaced Godwin and sailed her to the coast of Guinea. While there he was promoted to post captain in the sixth rate HMS Squirrel following the death there of her captain.) The Admiralty confirmed the appointment when Squirrel returned to England later that year.) Trompeuse returned to Deal from Africa on 25 July 1805.

Commander William Brooking Dolling replaced Shortland.

On 9 April 1806 Trompeuse sent into Dover Augusta Carolina, Harnicks, master, which had been sailing from Liverpool to Embden.

On 19 February 1809, Trompeuse, Crocus, and the brig-sloop Rolla were in company when Rolla recaptured the American ship Factor. Factor, of New York, Johnstone, master, had been sailing from Tenerife when a privateer captured her the day before between Beachy Head and Dungeness. The British sent her into Dover. The same privateer had also captured a brig, which the excise cutter Lively had recaptured and sent into the Downs.

On 15 May Trompeuse was in company with HMS Badger off the coast of France. They observed 11 French armed schuyts east of Boulogne. As Trompeuse came up, the schuyts tried to get into Ambleteuse, but three of them overshot the harbour and had to go round Cape Grisnez. That night boats from Trompeuse and Badger captured two schuyts, each armed with mounting two 6-pounder guns and two howitzers, and having 13-man crews. Despite heavy small arms fire from the beach and gunfire from shore batteries, the cutting-out party succeeded in bringing them out; the third schuyt was driven on the rocks. Trompeuse had one man slightly wounded. The French had two men wounded and six men threw themselves into the sea. The two captured schuyts came into Dover.

Commander John Hardy Godby replaced Dolling in September.

== Fate ==
The "Principal Officers and Commissioners of His Majesty's Navy" offered the "Trompeuse Sloop, of 380 tons", lying at Sheerness, for sale on 12 November 1810. She may not have sold at that time because reportedly she was broken up at Sheerness in March 1811.
