= Luigi Mercantini =

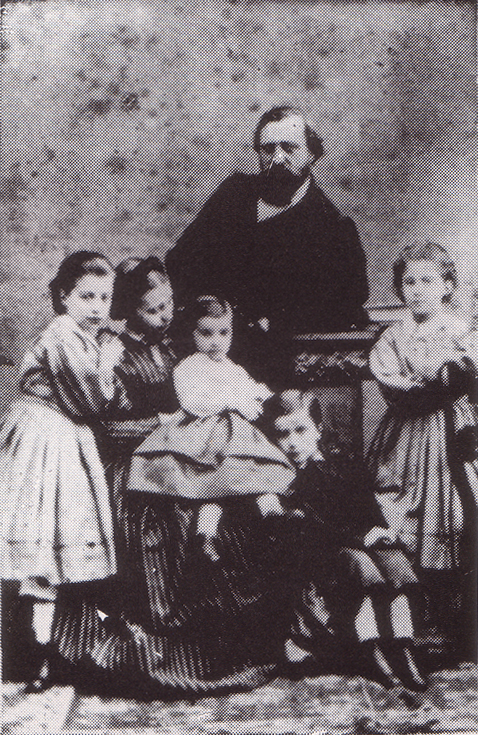
- Mercantini with his family
- Born: 20 September 1821; Ripatransone, Italy
- Died: 17 November 1872 (aged 51); Palermo, Italy
- Occupations: Poet, Lyricist

Luigi Mercantini (20 September 1821 – 17 November 1872) was an Italian poet and writer, who took part in the movements for the Italian unification in the late 19th century. He is better known for his poem "La spigolatrice di Sapri", depicting the ill-fated expedition led in 1857 by Carlo Pisacane against the Kingdom of Naples, which was also translated into English by Henry W. Longfellow with the title The Gleaner of Sapri.

Mercantini is also known for writing the lyrics of the patriotic hymn Canzone Italiana, better known as the Garibaldi Hymn, since it was commissioned in 1858 by Garibaldi himself to the poet, as the official battle song of his "Cacciatori delle Alpi" volunteer corps who joined in the Second Italian War of Independence the following year. The hymn's music was composed by his musician friend Alessio Olivieri, and proved hugely popular among Italians at home and abroad, famously being recorded by Enrico Caruso around the outbreak of World War I and again used as battle hymn of some brigades of the Italian resistance movement during World War II.

== See also ==
- La Spigolatrice, 2021 statue
