= The Daily Southerner =

- Type: Daily newspaper
- Format: Broadsheet
- Owner: Community Newspaper Holdings Inc.
- Publisher: John H. Walker
- Editor: John H. Walker
- Founded: 1826
- Ceased publication: 2014
- Language: American English
- Headquarters: 504 W. Wilson St. Tarboro, North Carolina 27886 United States
- Price: $.50
- OCLC number: 13168613
- Website: www.dailysoutherner.com

The Daily Southerner was an American, English language four-day (Monday and Wednesday through Friday) a week newspaper primarily serving the town of Tarboro, North Carolina, U.S., and surrounding Edgecombe County, North Carolina. The paper ceased publication May 30, 2014.

== History ==
The Tarboro Daily Southerner was first published as the Tarboro Free Press in 1826. The paper was purchased by the American Publishing Company (later Hollinger International) in 1991. Community Newspaper Holdings purchased the paper from Hollinger in 2000. The News & Observer of Raleigh, NC, reported that Community Newspaper Holdings closed the newspaper because it could not "sustain itself economically despite efforts to reduce costs by reducing frequency of publication, and outsourcing production and printing operations." Nine employees lost their jobs.

The lineage of the paper is as follows:

- Tarboro Free Press (1826–1852)
- The Tarboro Daily Southerner (1852–1867)
- The Daily Southerner (1889-191?)
- The Daily Southerner (1889-191?)
- The Southerner (191?-191?)
- The Daily Southerner (191?–2014)

The Daily Southerner had printed the weekly sales circulars for the Piggly Wiggly grocery store chain. It was a lucrative job, pumping hundreds of thousands of dollars into the coffers and keeping dozens of employees working as the old Goss Community press ran 24/7 and almost 365. Piggly Wiggly wanted better quality than the Community could deliver on newsprint — and CNHI didn't want to spend (or didn't have it to spend) the money required to upgrade the press' capabilities.

So, in March 2011, the message was delivered to the staff. Piggly Wiggly wound up opening its own print facility in Ohio and CNHI laid off a couple of dozen people, emptying the press room and gutting the newsroom. Oh, and CNHI signed a contract with the sister paper of their biggest competitor to print. Pages had to be sent early enough that it hamstrung the advantage of being the hometown newspaper. The old press stayed in the building until 2013, when it was dismantled and sent to a warehouse in Oklahoma for sale to a publication in a Latin American country. CNHI, though, had removed the brakes and tensioners from the Community and there was no real way to control the web as the press ran.

In 2012, veteran publisher John Walker, who had developed a reputation as a turnaround specialist at newspapers in West Texas, Northwest Arkansas, North Carolina's Triad and Southeast Louisiana was brought it to try and save the failing paper, but with a news staff of three and two sales reps and a correspondent to handle sports and cops, the die was cast.

After suffering a stroke in April 2013, Walker announced his retirement effective Feb. 28, 2014. Prior to leaving, Walker named staff veteran Calvin Adkins as news editor. Award winning Veteran sales manager Gene Hudson was placed in an interim position of overseer, but Sandy Selvy, publisher of CNHI's Albemarle newspaper was placed over the paper.

== See also ==
- List of newspapers in North Carolina
