= La Spigolatrice =

Statue in Sapri, Italy

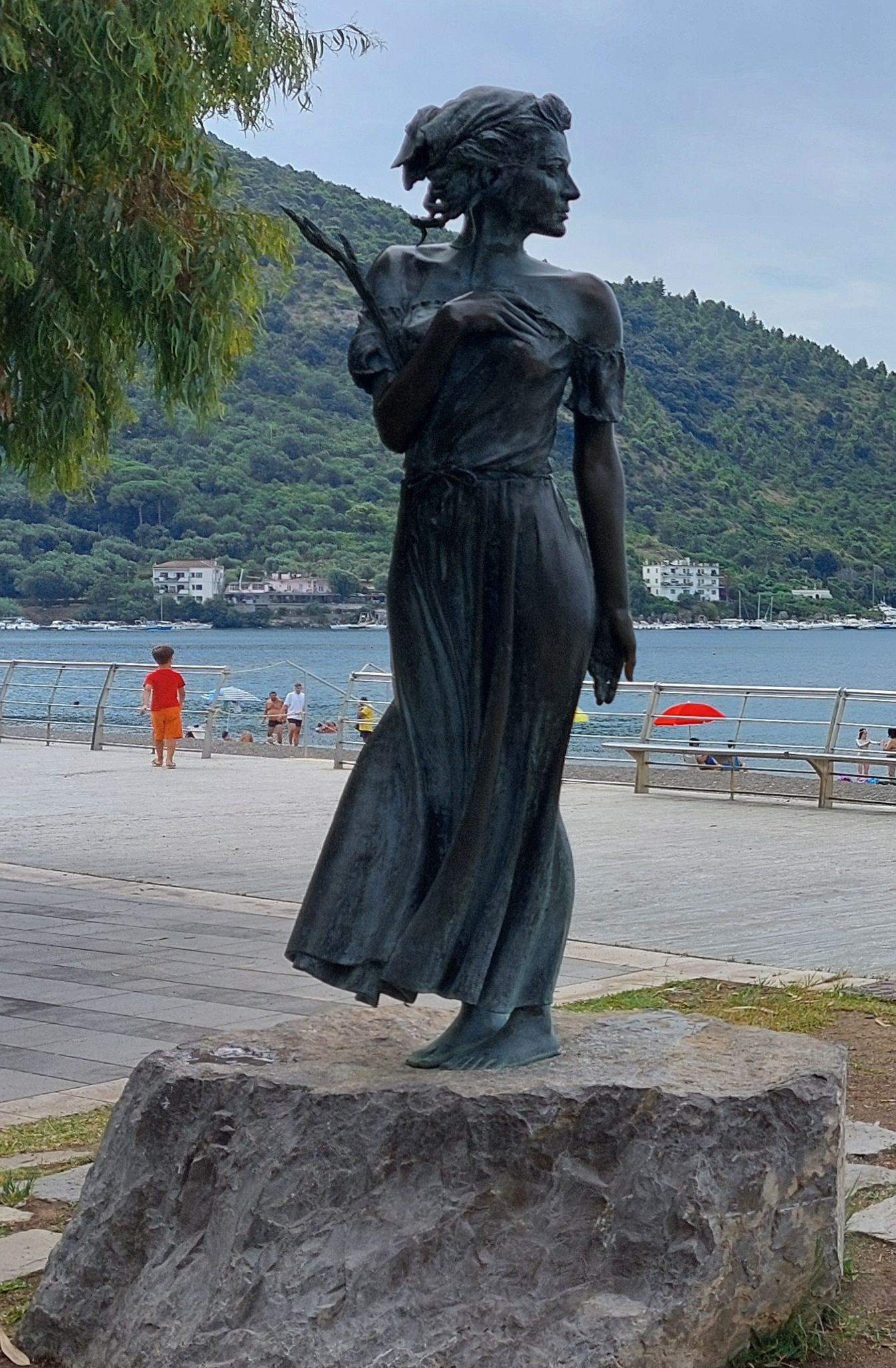
- Artist: Emanuele Stifano
- Year: 2021
- Medium: Bronze sculpture
- Subject: A young woman
- Location: Sapri, Italy; 40°04′23″N 15°37′44″E

La Spigolatrice ("The Gleaner") is a bronze statue by Emanuele Stifano, installed in 2021 in Sapri, Italy. It depicts a woman from Luigi Mercantini's poem The Gleaner of Sapri, and has attracted some criticism because of the "very well-defined" treatment of the buttocks (under a dress). The artist is unrepentant.
