= The Fayetteville Times =

Defunct newspaper

The Fayetteville Times was a morning daily newspaper in Fayetteville, North Carolina. It was first published on July 2, 1973, by Fayetteville Publishing Co. Roy Parker Jr. was the editor and author of editorials, while Tom English Jr. was managing editor. In 1984, the newspaper was one of three finalists for a Pulitzer Prize.

The Times was consolidated with the larger afternoon-only newspaper, The Fayetteville Observer, to form the consolidated morning daily newspaper, The Fayetteville Observer-Times. An editorial assistant at The Fayetteville Times, Penny Abernathy, went on to work for The New York Times and The Wall Street Journal.
