= Garner News =

- Type: Weekly newspaper
- Owner(s): Civitas Media
- Language: English
- Ceased publication: August 1, 2013
- Headquarters: Fuquay-Varina, North Carolina
- Sister newspapers: Fuquay-Varina Independent, Cleveland Post, Apex Herald and Holly Springs Sun
- Website: www.fuquay-varinaindependent.com/garner_news/front/

Garner News was a weekly newspaper based in Fuquay-Varina, North Carolina. It covered the town of Garner, North Carolina. It closed in 2013.
