= Apex Herald =

The Apex Herald
- Final cover of The Apex Herald (August 8, 2013)
- Type: Weekly newspaper
- Owner: Civitas Media
- Ceased publication: August 8, 2013
- Language: English
- Headquarters: 209 E. Vance St., Apex, North Carolina
- Sister newspapers: Fuquay-Varina Independent, Garner News, Holly Springs Sun, Cleveland Post
- Website: www.fuquay-varinaindependent.com/apex_herald

The Apex Herald was a newspaper based in Apex, North Carolina, United States, covering Apex, North Carolina. The Apex Herald was among the 46 publications owned by Heartland Publications, LLC when that company was purchased and merged in 2012 with three others under the, now-defunct, Civitas Media umbrella.

The final edition of the Apex Herald, Vol. 55, No. 32, was published on August 8, 2013. The four front-page articles were about Apex dentist Dr. Kenneth Leahy saving two drowning swimmers; Apex Middle School teacher Patricia Franklin traveling to Mumbai, India for cultural exchange training; the appointment of former Apex Mayor pro tem Bryan Gossage as Deputy Secretary of the North Carolina Department of Commerce; and a farewell message from the newspaper.

== History ==
The Apex Herald was owned by Ottaway Newspapers, a division of Dow Jones & Company, until its sale in 1994 to Durham, North Carolina–based publisher KNI Newspaper Network, headed by publisher Bill Kirkland.
