= Raleigh Sentinel =

Raleigh Sentinel was a daily newspaper (except Mondays) published in Raleigh, North Carolina, from 1865 to 1875. It was printed semiweekly beginning in 1876 and ceased publication on February 27, 1877. It was the official newspaper of the Democratic Party in North Carolina. During Reconstruction the editor, Josiah Turner, conducted a fervid campaign against carpetbaggers. The newspaper was the voice of the Democratic Party.

== History of publication ==
In June 1866 Turner said that he received a letter from Robert E. Lee. The general reported having misplaced his papers, which delayed him in writing a book about the American Civil War.

Theodore Bryant Kingsbury (1828 - 1913) left the Methodist Church ministry to edit the Raleigh Sentinel. He was a former journalist in Oxford, North Carolina, and Wilmington, North Carolina. In 1876 he moved to Wilmington to edit the Wilmington Morning Star.

On October 11, 1872, the offices of the Raleigh Sentinel were bombed with gunpowder. The powder was placed beneath a Hoe's large cylinder press early in the campaign to determine the outcome of the 1872 presidential election. Damage to property was estimated at $3,000. The Raleigh Sentinel's views were in line with those of Horace Greeley, editor of the New York Herald. Like Greeley, the North Carolina newspaper exposed the corruption of the administration of Ulysses Grant.

On March 16, 1876, Turner and W.H.H. Howerton, North Carolina Secretary of State, were arrested and charged with conspiracy and libel.
