= Holly Springs Sun =

Newspaper in North Carolina

- Type: weekly newspaper
- Owner(s): Civitas Media
- Language: English
- Ceased publication: August 1, 2013
- Headquarters: 209 E. Vance Street, Fuquay-Varina, North Carolina
- Sister newspapers: Fuquay-Varina Independent, Garner News, Cleveland Post, and Apex Herald
- Website: www.fuquay-varinaindependent.com/holly_springs_sun/front/

Holly Springs Sun was a weekly newspaper based in Fuquay-Varina, North Carolina covering Holly Springs. It closed in 2013.
