= Carolina Watchman =

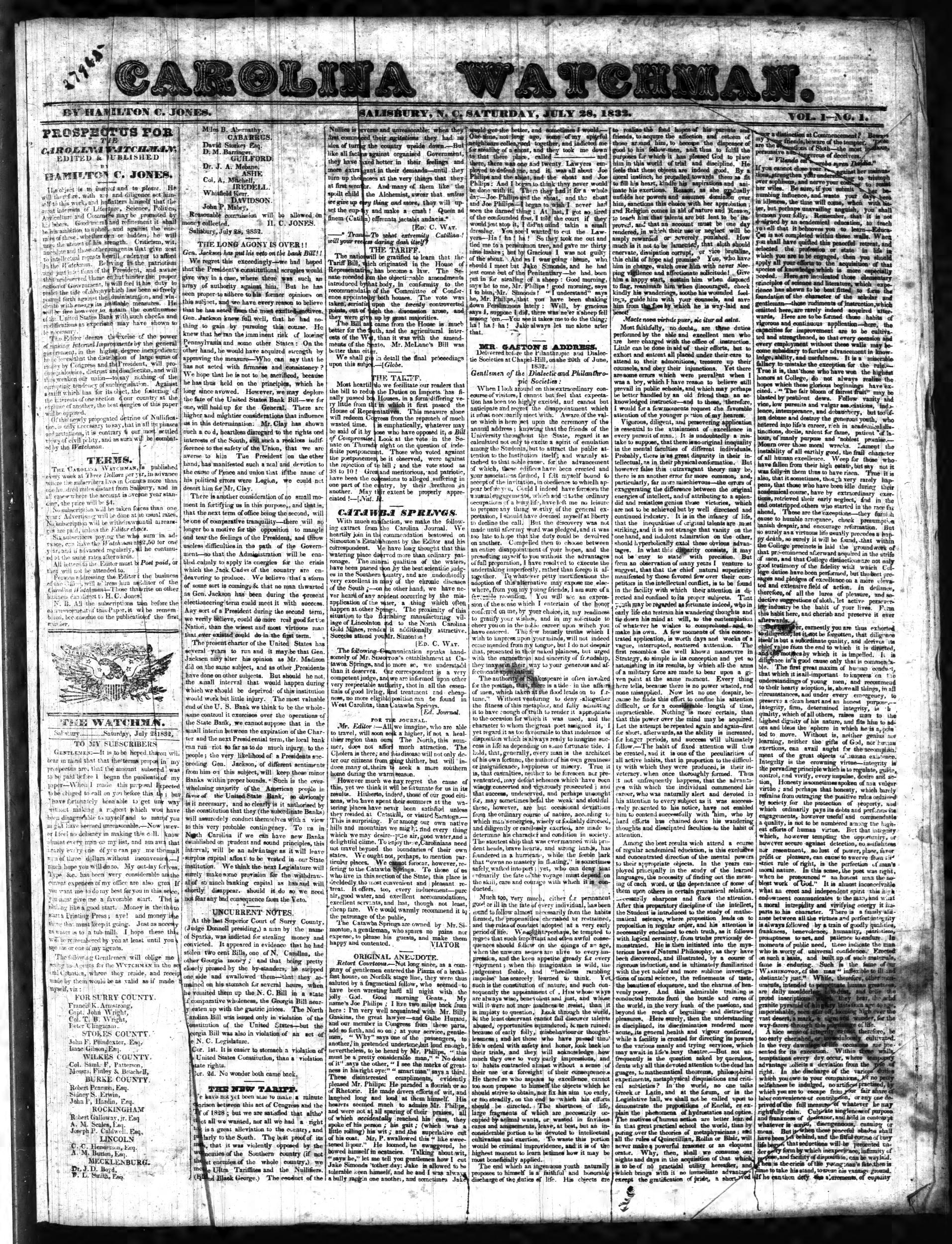
- First issue of the Carolina Watchman
- Type: Weekly newspaper
- Founder: Hamilton C. Jones
- Founded: July 28, 1832
- Ceased publication: January 29, 1937
- Political alignment: Various, including Whig, independent, Democratic, and Populist
- City: Salisbury, North Carolina, United States
- Circulation: 1,000 (1898); 2,327 (1913)

The Carolina Watchman was an American weekly newspaper published in Salisbury, North Carolina, from 1832 to 1937. It variously supported the Whig, Democratic, and Populist parties, as well as the Confederacy during the Civil War. For a few years, it was mostly politically independent and known as the Watchman & Old North State.

== History ==
=== Early years ===
The first issue of the Carolina Watchman was published July 28, 1832. The founding editor, Hamilton Chamberlain Jones (1798–1868), started it as a weekly newspaper competing with Salisbury's other newspaper, the Western Carolinian, which had turned from supporting President Andrew Jackson to supporting John C. Calhoun. The Watchman has been described as being founded in opposition to nullification, though it has been described as anti-Jackson as well. Early editions frequently contained humor and had a couple sketches by Jones. In the 1830s, it printed several advertisements seeking escaped slaves.

In the 1830s and the next decade, the Watchman supported the Whig Party (while that party existed). After that, the newspaper was described as "liberally conservative".

=== 1850–1890 ===
John Joseph (J. J.) Bruner (1817–1890) left an apprenticeship at the Western Carolinian to join the Watchman in its early years, and he became part-owner at age 22 and full owner at 33, in 1850. Though he often sold the paper to start other ventures, he often would buy it back too. Bruner developed a reputation as a forceful voice for the common man, and he used his newspaper to advance his interests, such as supporting the Confederacy in the Civil War (he did not print anything negative about Salisbury nor the Confederacy). A national newspaper directory from 1876 states that the Watchman "resisted the disunionists" before the war, was "thoroughly confederate during the war", and was "thoroughly union now, and democratic". Publication was suspended for six months in 1865–66.

In 1866, Lewis Hanes (1826–1882) launched a competing newspaper, the Old North State. Two years later, the two papers merged as the Watchman & Old North State. Upon the merger, Hanes became editor and Bruner remained publisher. Hanes claimed that the paper was politically independent, which was true during his editorship except when it backed the unsuccessful conservative effort to stop the adoption of a new state constitution in 1868.

Bruner bought the newspaper back when Hanes left Salisbury, rebranding it as the Carolina Watchman in 1871. With Bruner as editor, the Watchman's circulation apparently reached about 50 counties in North Carolina, and it was said that he fended off competition from more than 50 other papers. An 1889 newspaper catalogue lists the Watchman as a Democratic paper. In Bruner's later years, while he was one of North Carolina's oldest editors running one of its oldest newspapers, other editors in the state called him "Father Bruner".

=== 20th century ===
An 1898 catalogue lists the Carolina Watchman as a Populist paper, with editor H. J. Gasque and a circulation of 1,000. A catalogue fifteen years later says it was a Democratic paper, with a circulation of 2,327. On January 29, 1937, the weekly Watchman announced that it would be succeeded by the Rowan County Herald beginning February. The latest known issue of the Herald was published June 18, 1937.

== See also ==
- List of defunct newspapers of North Carolina
