= George Thomas (surveyor) =

Survey of the Frith (sic) of Forth, by George Thomas in 1815, Published as Admiralty Chart No 114

George Thomas (26 February 1781 – 1850) was a Master in the Royal Navy who was one of the early surveyors of the coasts of Great Britain

== Early life and education ==
Thomas was born in Southwark, son of William Thomas. At the age of eight, an orphan, he was admitted to Christ's Hospital, the first Bluecoat school. The last part of his education was in the Royal Mathematical School, where he learned the theory and practice of navigation. The mathematics master was William Wales who had revised Robertson's Elements of Navigation, the standard work used at the Royal Naval Academy as well as the Royal Mathematical School. On the 2 June 1796 he was discharged to the whaling ship Commerce to serve as an apprentice for seven years.

== Pressed into the Royal Navy ==
In November 1806, according to the UK National Archives, George Thomas was among a number of sailors from the American Brig Harry and Jane pressed into the Royal Navy after their ship was apprehended "trading with the enemy" during the siege and blockade of Montevideo.. What happened between 1796 and 1806 is uncertain. Tavener (1950) quotes from the Journal of William Mogg, who served under Thomas for four years from 1817. This account has the Commerce wrecked in the Pacific in 1797, the crew rescued by an American merchant ship, Thomas and another sailor, San Domingo Jack, landed on the uninhabited island of Mas-a-Fuera at their own request, the death of Thomas's companion in an accident, Thomas's rescue and travel to England via China, paying his way with the sealskins he had accumulated, and finally being taken from the ship on which he was a passenger by a press gang in the English Channel in 1809 or 1810. This account was repeated by Ritchie (1967).

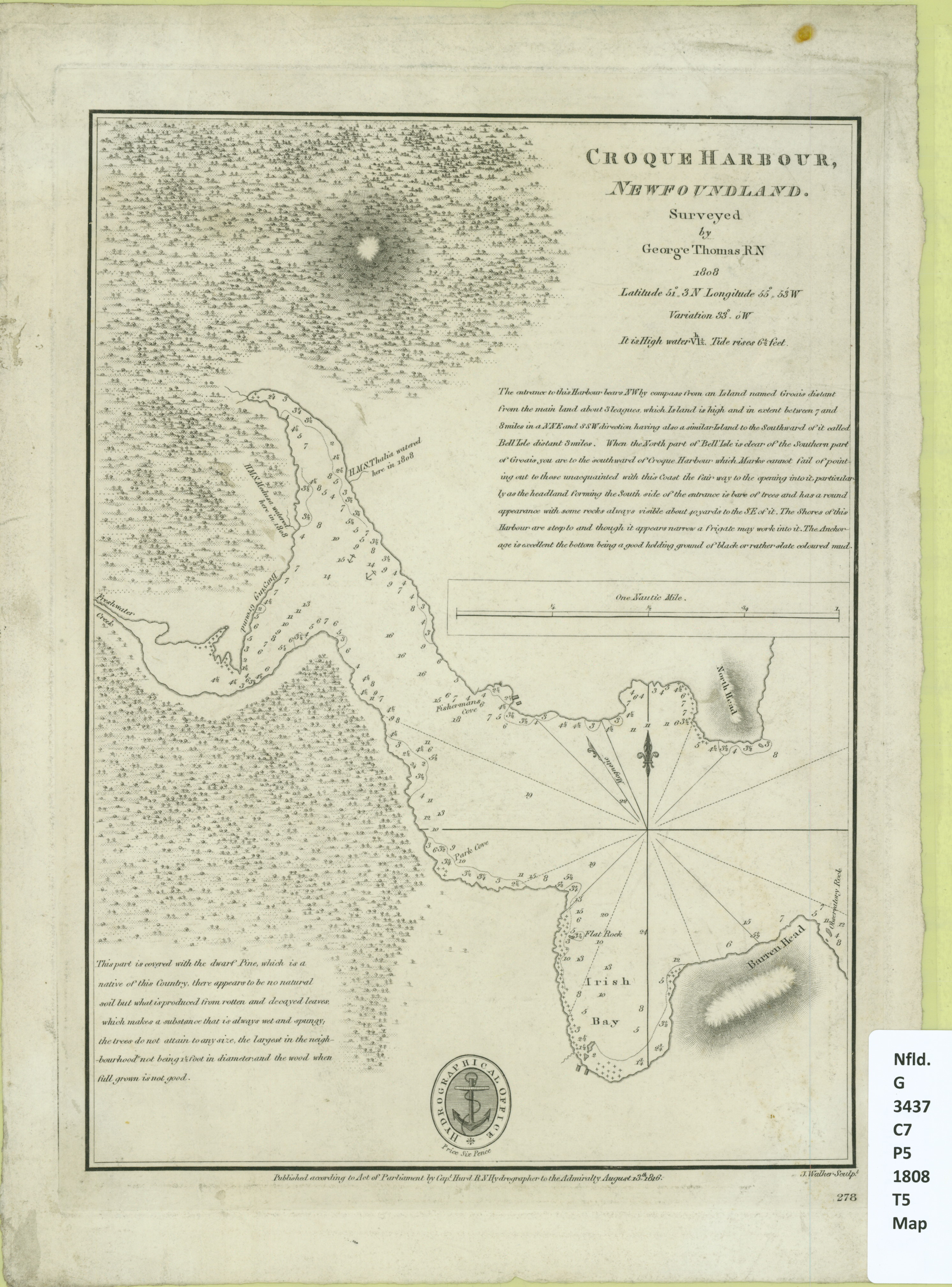
Admiralty Chart No 278 Croque Harbour Newfoundland, Published 1816

As Walker and Webb (2018) have pointed out, much of the above account is incompatible with contemporary records, in particular the date and place of the impressment. Also the Commerce was recorded as being captured by the Spanish at Pisco in Peru in May 1797. Walker and Webb have reconstructed the events as far as possible from the official archives. They suggest that Thomas spent about five of the years since the capture of Commerce as mate of an American trading vessel. The Royal Navy ship that captured Harry and Jane in 1806 was HMS Medusa under the command of the Honourable Duncombe Pleydell Bouverie. Bouverie recognised Thomas's skill as a navigator, and quickly promoted him to midshipman then master's mate. Bouverie was himself an accomplished surveyor, and on return to England in 1807 published Sailing Directions for the Río de la Plata. Medusa was then sent to Newfoundland in 1808, and Thomas conducted his first survey there, in Croque Harbour. This would be published as Admiralty Chart No 278.

== Master ==
Back in England, Bouverie continued his support of Thomas, and he was warranted as Master in November 1808, becoming acting Master of HMS Fisgard initially on convoy duty, then to the Scheldt in July 1809, in preparation for the Walcheren Campaign. The campaign involving 40,000 troops in support of Austria in its conflict with France, was a disaster, due largely to disease. Thomas, however, spent his time profitably, completing a chart of the Scheldt River. The survey, in disputed waters and made without the benefit of earlier charts, included a trigonometric survey, over 1,000 soundings with lead and line, tidal information, and the location of landmarks and buoys.The chart was praised by Thomas Hurd Hydrographer of the Navy as "by far the best nautical survey that has made its appearance since his appointment"..

== Surveyor ==
Thomas's chart of Fowey Harbour, published in 1813

Thomas was appointed by Hurd as the Admiralty Surveyor for Home Waters in 1810, first in HMS Gleaner then the following year in HMS Investigator, a purpose-built survey vessel. His first chart in British waters was of Fowey Harbour, for which he arranged engraving of the copper plate for chart production. In 1813 he was again in the Scheldt, as master of pilots on HMS Impregnable, flagship of the Admiral the Duke of Clarence (later King William IV). The navy was supporting the action in the Netherlands that ended with the failed Siege of Bergen op Zoom (1814). Thomas returned to England and Investigator, resuming the survey work that would take him from the south-east of England to the north of Scotland.

Thomas commanded the Investigator until 1836 In 1816 he was surveying the approaches to Dublin, and made some critical comments about Howth Harbour which caused considerable controversy. In 1817 he was involved in a collaboration with the Ordnance Survey and Jean-Baptiste Biot representing the French Academy of Sciences to make pendulum observations in Shetland. This was part of a project to determine the figure of the Earth, and to link the French and British national surveys. The collaboration was problematic, and plagued by personal animosity between Biot and Thomas Colby of the Survey. The British team did their work on Balta, the French on Unst and the linkage was not made. However Biot was generous in his praise of Thomas.

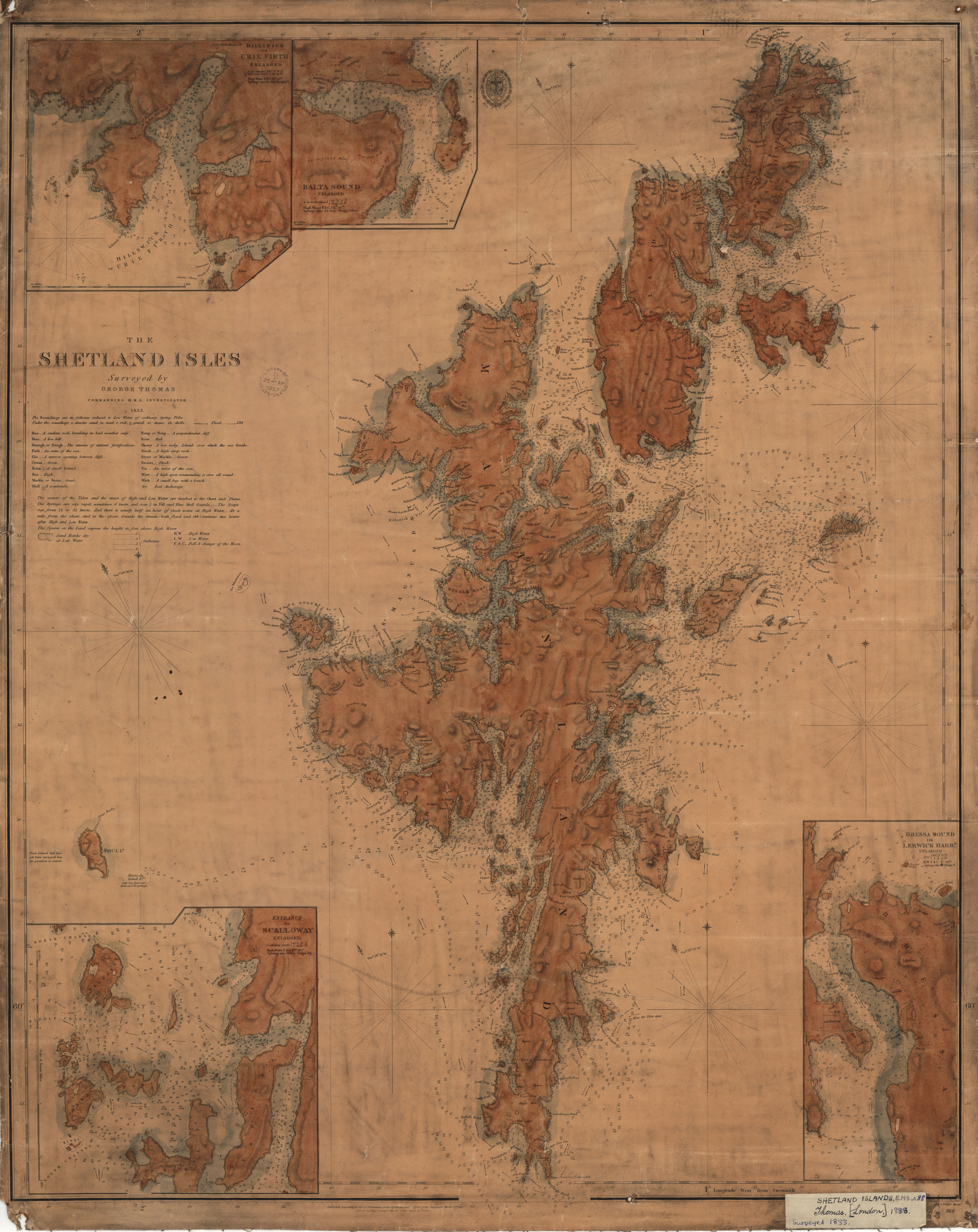
Admiralty Chart No 1118 Shetland Islands, Published 1838

In 1819-1820 Thomas was surveying the approaches to the River Thames. In this area with many treacherous shoals, attempts had been made to use floating marker buoys but these had tended to break loose in the strong currents. Thomas determined to fix the positions of two of the most important shoals, Kentish Knock and Long Sound. The distance was much too great for direct triangulation from land, but Thomas was able to use various marks including a wreck, light vessels, and temporary stations on sandbanks to bridge the gaps. This survey fixed the exact position of the hazards for the first time. These techniques "opened up new possibilities for extending surveys across the shallow waters off the English coasts".

Over the following years, Thomas trained several notable surveyors, including his son Frederick, while returning to the Forth, completing several more triangulations in the outer Thames, and making surveys of the Orkney and Shetland Islands. In respect of his survey of the Shetland Islands, a notice in The Nautical Magazine stated that "This is the only correct trigonometrical survey ever made of these islands, and will remain a lasting memorial of the valuable services of Mr. Thomas in this scientific branch of his profession." The survey work also contributed to the Sailing Directions for Shetland.

== Later life ==
Investigator was paid off in 1836, and in 1837 Thomas took command of HMS Mastiff. He retired in 1846. Despite his many years of service, many of them in command, and more than one application, he was never promoted to officer rank. His younger son George Hurd Thomas died in 1848, aged 28. He had been promoted to Lieutenant in 1846. George Thomas died in 1850.
