= HMS Gleaner (H86) =

British naval vessel (1983–2018)

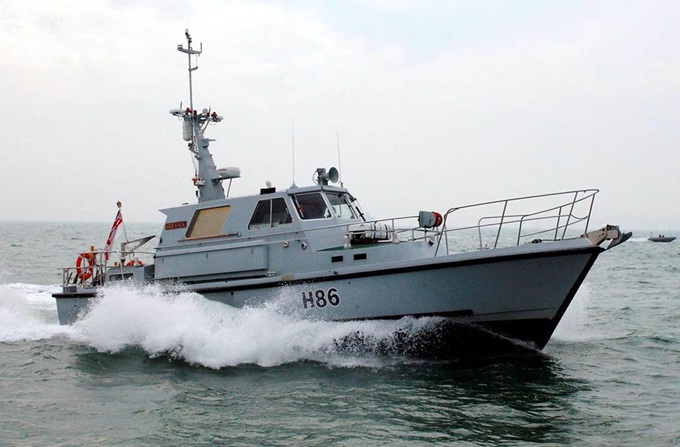
- HMSML Gleaner in the Solent, 2013

History

United Kingdom
- Name: Her Majesty's Survey Motor Launch Gleaner
- Operator: Royal Navy
- Builder: Emsworth
- Launched: 18 October 1983
- Sponsored by: Mrs. M. Read
- Commissioned: 5 December 1983
- Decommissioned: 16 February 2018
- Home port: HMNB Devonport, Plymouth
- Identification: MMSI number: 235076464; Callsign: GDIF
- Motto: Fruges consumere nati; Latin: "Born to reap its reward"
- Status: Awaiting disposal
- Badge

General characteristics
- Displacement: 22 tonnes (22 long tons; 24 short tons)
- Length: 14.8 m (48 ft 7 in)
- Beam: 4.7 m (15 ft 5 in)
- Draught: 1.6 m (5 ft 3 in)
- Propulsion: 2 × Volvo Penta TAMD 122 P-A diesel engines
- Speed: 14 knots (26 km/h; 16 mph)
- Complement: 9 (2 Officers, 1 Senior Rate, 6 Junior Rates)
- Notes: Uses multibeam and sidescan sonar to collect accurate data about the texture of the seabed. Can be used in the shallowest of inshore waters.

HMSML Gleaner (H86) was the smallest commissioned vessel in the Royal Navy, at the time of her decommissioning, with a length of just under 15 metres and a ship's company of just nine (two officers, one Senior Rating and six Junior Ratings). She was based in Devonport, Plymouth. The ship prefix "HMSML" stands for Her Majesty's Survey Motor Launch.

Gleaner was withdrawn from service in February 2018. A replacement vessel, HMS Magpie was commissioned in June 2018.

== History ==
Gleaner was the sixth ship to bear the name and was commissioned on 5 December 1983. With a top speed of 14 knots (26 km/h; 16 mph), Gleaner was designed to conduct inshore surveys along the south coast of England, though she has since surveyed all around the coastline of Great Britain and visited various ports in Europe.

As an advanced survey vessel, Gleaner possessed an array of technology, including multibeam and sidescan sonar to collect bathymetry and seabed texture data and compile a detailed picture of the seabed for later analysis. Her survey equipment also included an Applanix POS MV system for georeferencing and motion compensation, C-NAV GPS, Kongsberg EM2040 Multibeam Echo Sounder and a Kongsberg EA400 Singlebeam Echo Sounder.

Gleaner was one of the few Royal Navy ships to visit landlocked Switzerland, having travelled up the Rhine to Basel in 1988. Earlier visits to the country were by HMS Flintham and Dittisham in 1969, and HMS Sabre and Cutlass in 1979.

Gleaner also attended the 2010 Portsmouth Navy Days event.

In 2016, Gleaner conducted an extensive survey of the Firth of Forth as part of the preparation work for the departure of HMS Queen Elizabeth in the spring of 2017. This work was necessary as the most recent survey was 60 years old.

Gleaner entered Plymouth for the last time on 31 January 2018 before being decommissioned. Gleaner was replaced by HMS Magpie, which was commissioned in June 2018.

Gleaner was purchased by a Wisbech company on completion of her decomisioning and has subsequently been sold to Safety Boat Solutions Ltd a Lowestoft based Survey / Safety boat company where she is, as of Oct 2026 being refitted to comply with Workboat Code 3 ready for charter in February 2027.
