= Alamance Gleaner =

The Alamance Gleaner
- Type: Weekly newspaper
- Publisher: Parker & Johnson 1876, Eldridge & Kernodle 1881
- Founded: 1875
- Ceased publication: May 10, 1956
- Language: English
- Headquarters: Graham, North Carolina
- OCLC number: 11509320

The Alamance Gleaner was a weekly newspaper based in Graham, North Carolina. The newspaper was published from February 9, 1875, through May 10, 1956. The first editor was E. S. Parker. Before it ceased publication, it was published by Parker & Johnson through 1881 and then by Eldridge & Kernodle until its closing.

== History ==
The Alamance Gleaner was founded in 1879 and at the time was the only newspaper in Graham county, North Carolina. According to the 1879 American Newspaper Directory, the paper was distributed on Tuesdays, 22 x 32, and four pages long. The subscription price in 1879 was $1.50. Adjusted for inflation, it cost $38.51. It is unknown how often this fee was paid for the newspaper. According to the American Newspaper Directory, circulation was over 500 at the time. By 1890, the editor and publisher had changed to J.D. Kernodle. At this time, circulation was down to just 250 subscriptions and the distribution day changed to Thursdays. J.D. Kernodle also made the paper smaller. At this time it was 12x24 according to that year's American Newspaper Directory.

== Archives ==
Pages of The Alamance Gleaner can be found at North Carolina Newspapers.
