= HMS Gleaner (1809) =

History

United Kingdom
- Name: Gleaner
- Launched: 1802
- Fate: Sold to Royal Navy, 1809

United Kingdom
- Name: HMS Gleaner
- Acquired: 1809 by purchase
- Fate: Wrecked April 1814

General characteristics
- Tons burthen: 15379/94, or 154 (bm)
- Sail plan: Ketch
- Complement: 30
- Armament: Survey vessel and yard lighter:2 × 12-pounder carronades; Armed ketch: 14 × 12-pounder carronades

Gleaner, later HMS Gleaner, was a ketch launched in 1802. She initially served as a light vessel and survey vessel. She served the Royal Navy as the "hired ketch Gleaner" from 12 July 1808 until the Navy purchased her in 1809. As a Royal Navy vessel, she served in the Mediterranean Sea, on the North American station, and off the north coast of Spain, participating in the capture of several vessels. She was wrecked off the north coast of Spain in 1814.

== Gleaner ==
Gleaner was launched in 1802 and the Royal Navy hired her from 12 July 1808. She was under the command of Lieutenant Andrew Green. On 2 December Green and Gleaner captured the Danish sloop Emanuel, Jeffen, master. She had been sailing from Droutheim to Bordeaux and arrived at Plymouth on 7 December.

On 17 January 1809, Gleaner was on the coast of Spain, ready to take dispatches back to Britain.

== HMS Gleaner ==
The Navy purchased Gleaner in 1809 and ordered her to be "fitted out as a float light for Thornton Ridge," (51°34′30″N 3°0′30″E), "established with guns and men." Although the Navy purchased Gleaner, many subsequent reports still refer to her as a "hired ketch" or "Hired armed ketch".

Already by early 1810 Gleaner was carrying dispatches and capturing vessels. In March she detained the America, Dunkin, master, which was sailing from Baltimore and Lisbon. Gleaner sent her into Plymouth. On 30 October Gleaner was at Falmouth, having brought mails from Surinam. Eleven days later she sailed for Surinam again.

In 1811 Gleaner sailed for the Mediterranean. Early in 1811, Lieutenant Alexander Branch was first lieutenant on Pylades, which was operating in the Aegean archipelago. Captain Charles Ferguson of Pylades ordered Branch to take charge of the "armed ketch" Gleaner, during the temporary absence of her proper commander, and to search all the Greek vessels he could find to see if they were carrying French cargoes under a neutral flag. Off Samos, Gleaner encountered a polacca of 12 long guns and 70 men. A two-hour single-ship action ensued before the polacca struck. During the action a cannon ball mangled Branch's right leg. He lay essentially untreated until Gleaner was able to reach Smyrna five days later, where his leg was amputated. He then endured three months of suffering before he was able to heal. Despite the gallantry of the action, Branch did not receive promotion, and it was another two years before he received a pension for his injuries. As soon as he was able to move on crutches, Lieutenant Branch returned to Pylades and remained senior lieutenant on her until she returned to England in late 1811. The Sublime Porte claimed the polacca on the grounds that she belonged to an Ottoman subject. The British Ambassador to the Sublime Porte argued that she should be declared a legitimate prize, but was unable to prevail and she was restored to Ottoman control.

In August 1811, Gleaner became a dockyard lighter, and a light vessel for the Galloper Sands (51°46.864′N 01°57.871′E). In 1812 Gleaner was under the command of her master, Mr. J. Trickey.

On 19 June she sailed for North America. She was reported to have arrived at Halifax, Nova Scotia on 22 July to verify the news of war, but then sailed to New York. Before Gleaner arrived at Halifax, she participated in some captures. On 18 July Ringdove, which was apparently serving on the Halifax, Nova Scotia station, captured the ship Magnet, of 172 tons (bm), from Belfast, bound to New York, with passengers, and a small quantity of linen. The Royal Navy took Magnet into service as a prison ship at Halifax, Nova Scotia. Ringdove was in company with Gleaner. (Note: In September 1815 there was a pay out of a grant for the capture. A first-class share was worth £348 15s 2½d; a sixth-class share, that of an ordinary seaman, was worth £5 7s 7d.) The next day Ringdove captured the schooner Rover, of 98 tons (bm), sailing from Liverpool for Amelia Island. Rover was carrying coals, earthenware, and hardware. Once again Gleaner was in sight. (Note: A first-class share of the prize money was worth £90 3s 2d; a sixth-class share was worth £1 7s 9¼d.)

On 27 February 1813, the "Gleaner hired armed ketch", Lieutenant William Knight, captured the schooner Amphrite, of 164 tons (bm). She was sailing from New York to Bordeaux with a cargo of cotton and potash.

One month later, Knight wrote that Gleaner had captured the French privateer Adelaide some six leagues WNW of Cape St Vito (Sicily). While both vessels were lying becalmed, the privateer used her sweeps to bring her into position to attack Gleaner. Adelaide was armed with six guns and had a crew of 46 men. Nevertheless, she struck to Gleaner. Adelaide was five days out of Naples and had taken nothing. Knight's letter was dated at Plymouth on 6 May, suggesting that Gleaner had been in the Mediterranean carrying dispatches, and then returned.

On 23 October 1813 Gleaner, still under the command of William Knight, was in sight when Andromache captured the French frigate Trave after an engagement of only 15 minutes. Trave, although a new vessel, had lost her masts in a storm and was sailing under jury-rigged masts and so unable to maneuver. She was armed with twenty-eight French 18-pounder long guns and sixteen 18-pounder carronades, and had a crew of 321 men, almost all Dutch. Before she struck she had one man killed, and 28 men wounded, including her commander capitaine de frégate Jacob Van Maren. Andromache had little damage and only two men wounded. The Royal Navy took Trave into service as the troopship Trave.

Lieutenant Alexander Branch returned to command of Gleaner on 2 December 1813, on the north coast of Spain. As the Duke of Wellington moved on Bayonne, Gleaner blockaded the Ardour river. On 24 February 1814 when a flotilla of hired and purchased boats crossed the highly dangerous waters at the bar to the river, preparatory to erecting a floating bridge, Rear-Admiral Penrose hoisted his flag on Gleaner to supervise the operation. Although some boats had been lost and a number of men drowned, 25 chasse marees and some gunboats succeeded in getting into the river. There they formed a 900-yard long floating bridge.

In January 1819, the London Gazette reported that Parliament had voted a grant to all those who had served under the command of Admiral Viscount Keith in 1812, between 1812 and 1814, and in the Gironde, the grant to include the vessels that had crossed the bar of the Ardour. Gleaner was listed among the vessels that had served under Keith in 1813 and 1814. (Note: The money was paid in three tranches. For someone participating in the first through third tranches, a first-class share was worth £256 5s 9d; a sixth-class share was worth £4 6s 10d. For someone participating only in the second and third tranches a first-class share was worth £202 6s 8d; a sixth-class share was worth £5 0s 5d.)

== Fate ==
Admiral Penrose chose Gleaner to take the dispatches concerning the operation to create the bridge back to Britain, but asked Branch to wait at Saint-Jean-de-Luz for the arrival of one of General Lord Wellington's officers with dispatches from the general. Contemporary sources claim that Gleaner foundered there on 3 March 1814. According to a modern account, the weather worsened on 1 April 1814, but Gleaner was well-anchored and prepared and rode out the storm until the morning of 2 April. Unfortunately, the storm drove a merchant sloop across Gleaner's bows. Gleaner's crew separated the two vessels, and the crew of the sloop was able to take shelter on the ketch before their sloop sank. As the winds worsened they drove Gleaner under the bows of a transport brig, where she became so trapped that she started to come apart from the action of the wind and waves. By 5pm Gleaner was so damaged that her crew and that of the sloop transferred to the transport brig. The combined crews were able to cut Gleaner free. The waves swept her onto the beach and she disappeared within minutes. The brig was able to rid out the storm until the next day, but then her crew was forced to cut her cables and to drive her on to the beach. All the survivors made it safely ashore. In all, the storm wrecked 17 vessels.

The subsequent court martial acquitted Lieutenant Branch, his officers, and crew of any culpability in the loss of Gleaner. On 6 June 1814 the Admiralty promoted Branch and gave him command of the brig HMS Swinger.
