= Edward James Bedford =

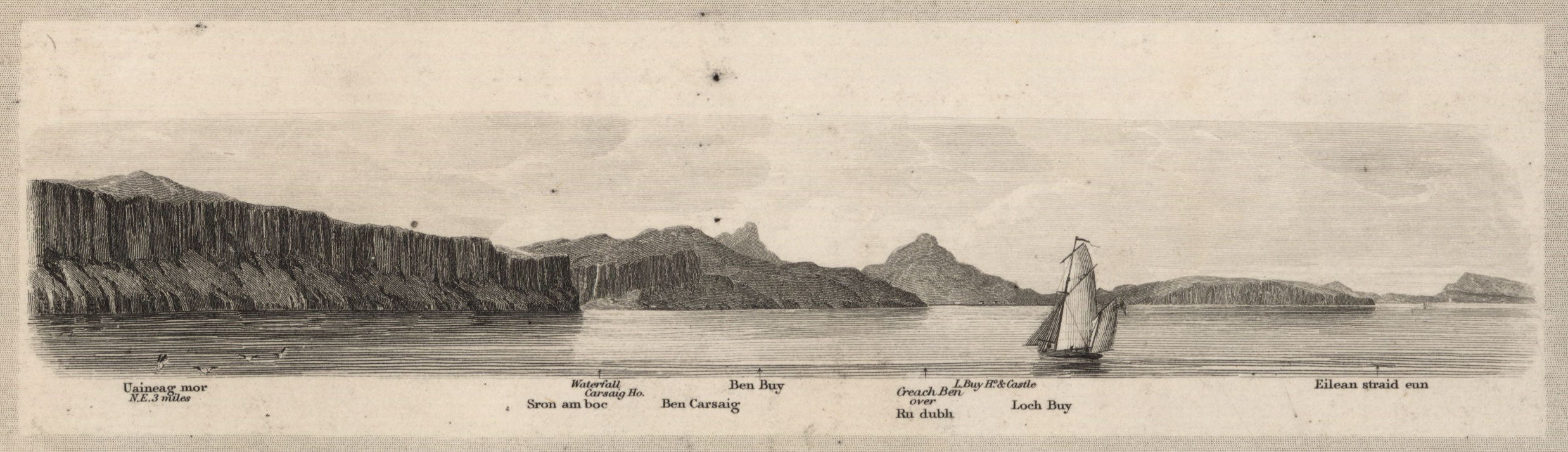
View of Carsaig Bay and Loch Buie, Isle of Mull, from an Admiralty Chart of 1862

Rear-Admiral Edward James Bedford FRGS (18 August 1810 – 1 July 1887) was a Royal Navy officer noted for his work as a surveyor, particularly in Scotland.

Bedford was the second son of Lieutenant Frederick Bedford, R.N. He entered the Navy in February 1824. His first assignment was with HMS Snap under the command of Lieutenant Frederick Bullock. Snap was surveying the coast of Newfoundland, determining the precise positions of the many headlands that had been well charted by James Cook, but without the aid of chronometers. He was then with HMS Alert and HMS Seringapatam in South America and the Pacific.

Bedford joined the survey of Great Britain in 1832, and was promoted to Lieutenant in June of that year. He was engaged in the survey of the coast of Scotland from 1843-1847 in HMS Shearwater under the command of Captain Charles Robinson, and continued survey work in Scotland in various ships. He was promoted Commander in 1846, and was placed in charge of the survey of the Argyll coast in 1853. He was made a fellow of the Royal Geographical Society in 1854.

Bedford's surveying work in Scotland led to the publication of about 20 Admiralty Charts. The coloured fair chart of his survey of Loch Awe (1861) was singled out by John Washington, Hydrographer of the Navy as "one of the most beautiful ever sent in".

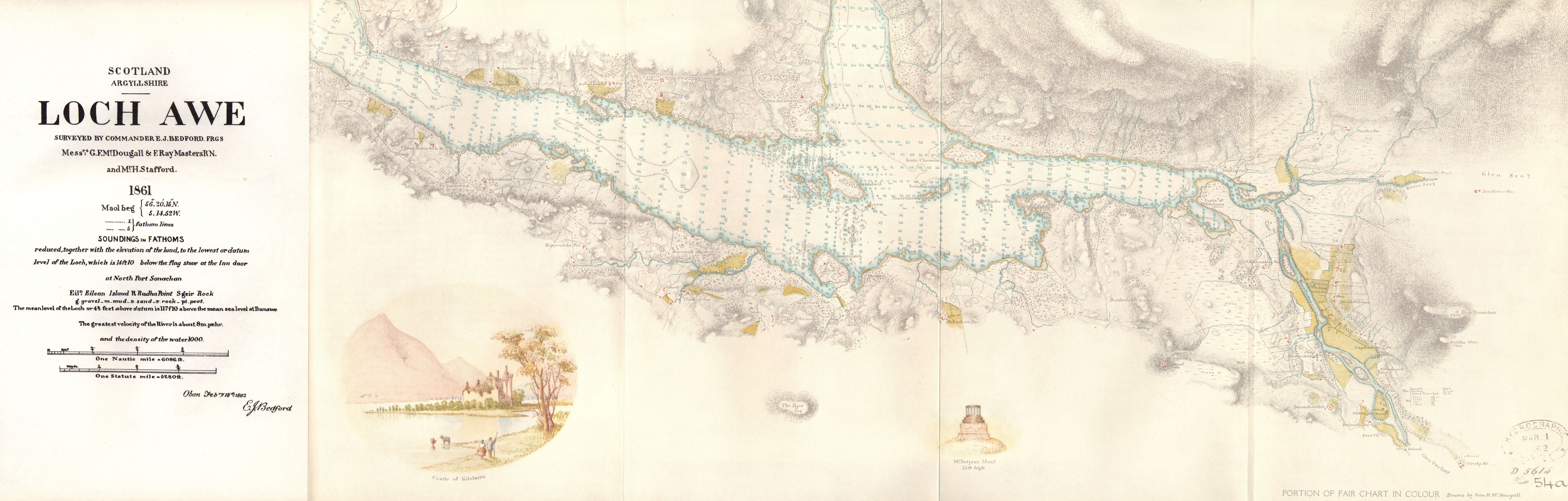

Bedford was transferred to HMS Lightning in 1864, working on the west coasts of Britain. He compiled the Sailing Directions for the Bristol Channel, first published in 1869. He retired in 1870, and was promoted to Rear Admiral in the retired list in 1878. He was married to Miss Swainson, of Liverpool, by whom he left a family. He died on 1 July 1877.
