= Byron Drury =

British naval officer (1815–1888)

Admiral Byron Drury FRGS

Personal details
- Born: 1815 Harrow on the Hill, London, England
- Died: 1888 (aged 72–73)
- Spouse: Helen Stewart (m. 1846; died 1881)

Military service
- Allegiance: United Kingdom
- Branch/service: Royal Navy
- Rank: Admiral

Admiral Byron Drury (1815–1888) was a British naval officer.

== Biography ==
Drury was born in Harrow on the Hill, the son of Rev. Henry Drury, of Harrow School; at which place he, and his father, Dr. Drury, were masters for about 70 years.

Byron Drury entered the Royal Naval College in 1828; and embarked, 13 August 1830, as a Volunteer, on board HMS Aetna surveying vessel, under the command of Captain Edward Belcher. He afterwards served for upwards of three years, latterly as a midshipman, in HMS Rainbow, under Captain Sir John Franklin, on the Mediterranean station; and, joining next HMS Racehorse under Captain Sir James Everard Home, took an active part, as mate, in the siege of Pará in Brazil in 1835, where he was for several days in action with the enemy’s batteries. Landing at night he conducted over 200 Brazilians to the beach for embarkation from the midst of the insurgents. He was also involved in surveying the Pará River.

Drury was with Sir Gordon Bremer, in HMS Alligator, he subsequently assisted in surveying the harbour at Port Essington, in South Australia, during the formation of that place into a settlement.

On 30 November 1839 he became an acting-lieutenant by which time HMS Alligator was in Indian waters. He was engaged in most of the hostilities against the Chinese. He commanded a division of boats at the first capture of Canton in 1841, For his services he received the China medal, and officially promoted, by commission dated 8 June 1841.

On 6 July 1841 he transferred to HMS Calliope under Captain Augustus Kuper While in Calliope, he proved to be particularly useful by his valuable exertions in surveying and sounding the channels in the Yang-tse-Kiang, preparatory to the ascent of the British fleet to Nanking.

Drury’s next appointments was on 30 September 1843, to the steamer HMS Shearwater, under Captain Charles Gepp Robinson, which was employed in surveying the west coast of Scotland. On 10 February 1845 he transferred to HMS Herald, under Captain Henry Kellett, fitting for the Pacific. He was superseded from the latter ship on promotion to the rank of Commander on 22 May 1845. In February 1846, he returned to Shearwater and continued to work on the survey of the west coast of Scotland.

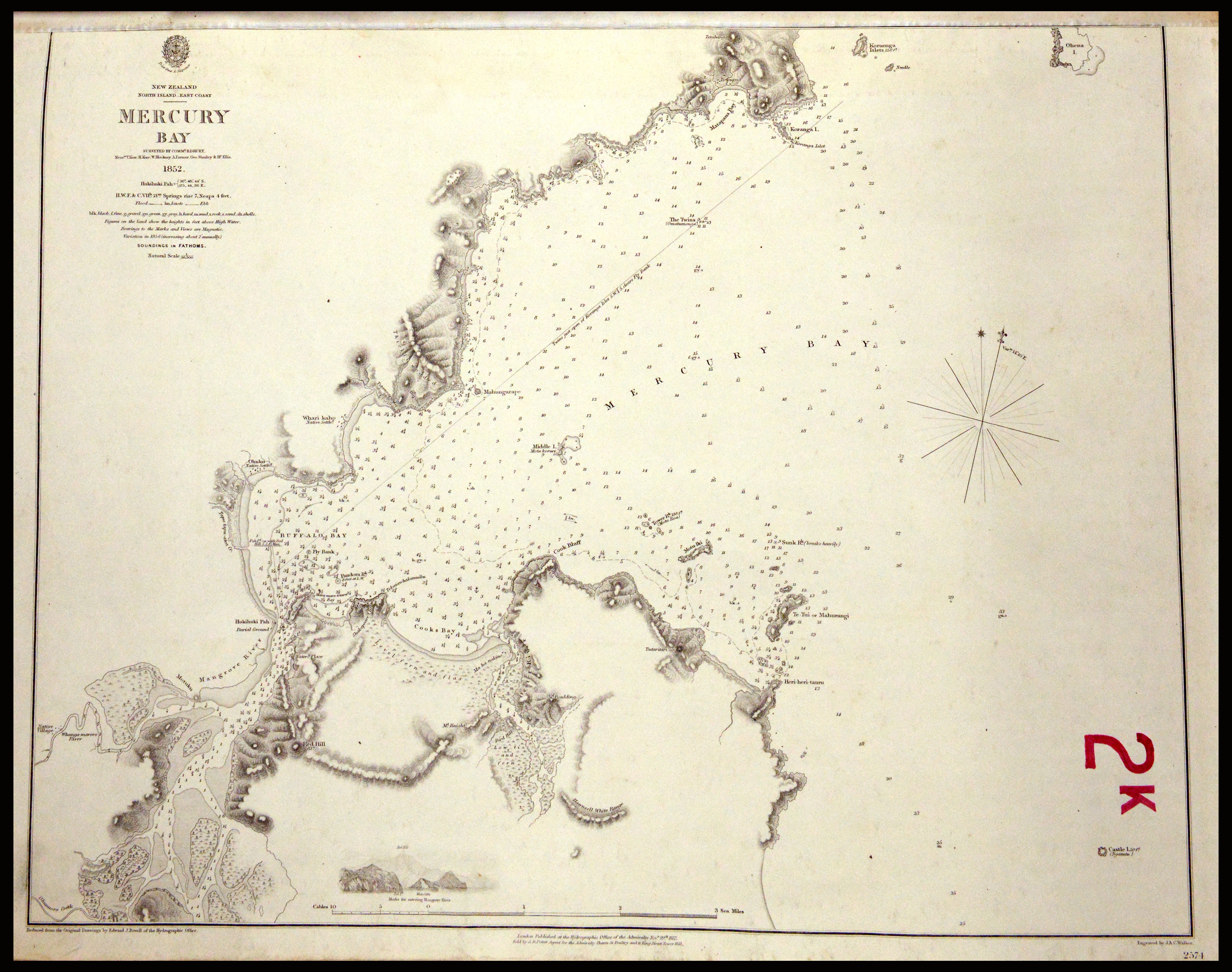
Admiralty Chart No 2574 Mercury Bay, surveyed by Drury in 1852

In December 1850 he took command of HMS Pandora, which was employed from 20 until June 1856 surveying the coasts of New Zealand, continuing the work of John Lort Stokes in HMS Acheron. He was thanked and recommended to the Admiralty by the Governor, Sir George Grey. On leaving the colony he received a testimonial and a service of plate from the Chamber of Commerce and a portion of the inhabitants of Auckland. He was a Fellow of the Royal Geographical Society.

He was promoted to captain in 1857 and retired. He was promoted to captain in 1866, to rear-admiral in 1875 and vice-admiral in 1879.

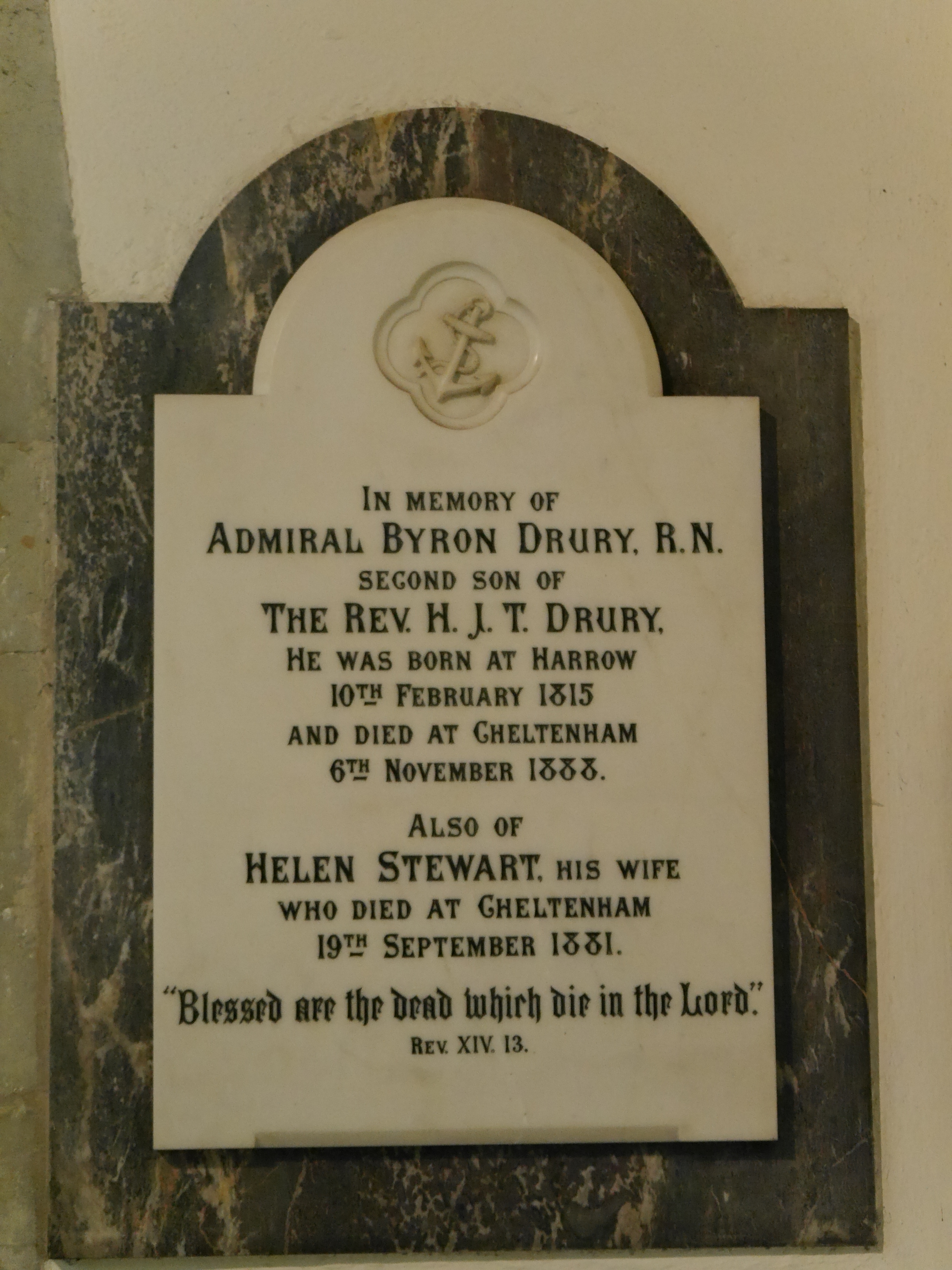
Byron Drury memorial, St Mary's, Harrow on the Hill

Drury died in Cheltenham in November 1888, and there is a memorial to his death in St Mary's, Harrow on the Hill.

== Family ==
He married, 9 June 1846, Helen Stewart (died 1881), daughter of Robert Morris of Moorburn, Ayrshire.

== Legacy ==
Drury Inlet in the Queen Charlotte Strait region of the Central Coast of British Columbia, Canada, extending west from Wells Passage to the northwest of North Broughton Island, northwest of the town of Port Hardy is named after him.

As captain of HMS Pandora, he took part in the survey of New Zealand that led to the publication of the New Zealand Pilot. This included Manukau Harbour in 1853. Nearby locality, Drury is named after him.
