= Richard Hoskyn =

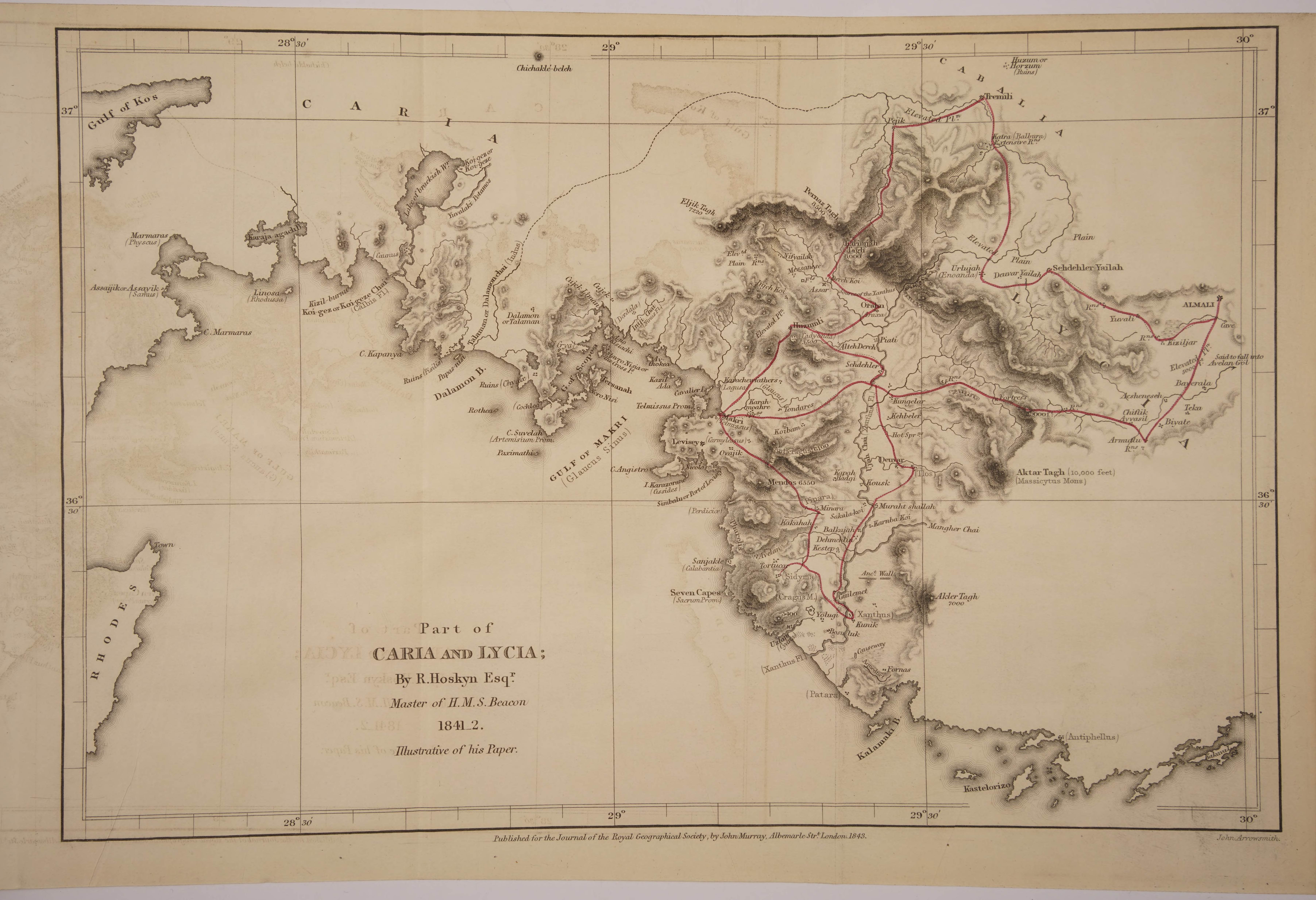
Hoskyn's map of his survey and exploration in southern Asia Minor in 1840-1841

Richard Hoskyn (1811–1873) was a Royal Navy officer and hydrographic surveyor. He discovered the site of Ancient Kaunos in what is now southern Turkey, surveyed much of the coast of Ireland, carried out deep-sea sounding in preparation for the laying of telegraphic cables, and became superintendent of charts for the UK Admiralty.

Hoskyn began his surveying career in 1835, when he was appointed acting Master on HMS Fairy working with William Hewett in the North Sea. The next year he transferred to HMS Beacon under Thomas Graves. He was promoted to Master in 1840. He continued working as assistant to Graves, surveying in the Mediterranean until 1843.

While surveying on the south coast of Turkey, Hoskyn carried out inland exploration and mapping from November 1840 to December 1841. The main purpose was to create a map of the region, but he also investigated some of the ancient sites. Entering the Dalyan River, he came across the remains of an ancient city with rock tombs, a theatre, baths, temples and an aqueduct. From an inscription, he was able to establish that this was the classical Caunus or Kaunos. He also visited the ancient sites of Telmessos, Tlos and Xanthos.

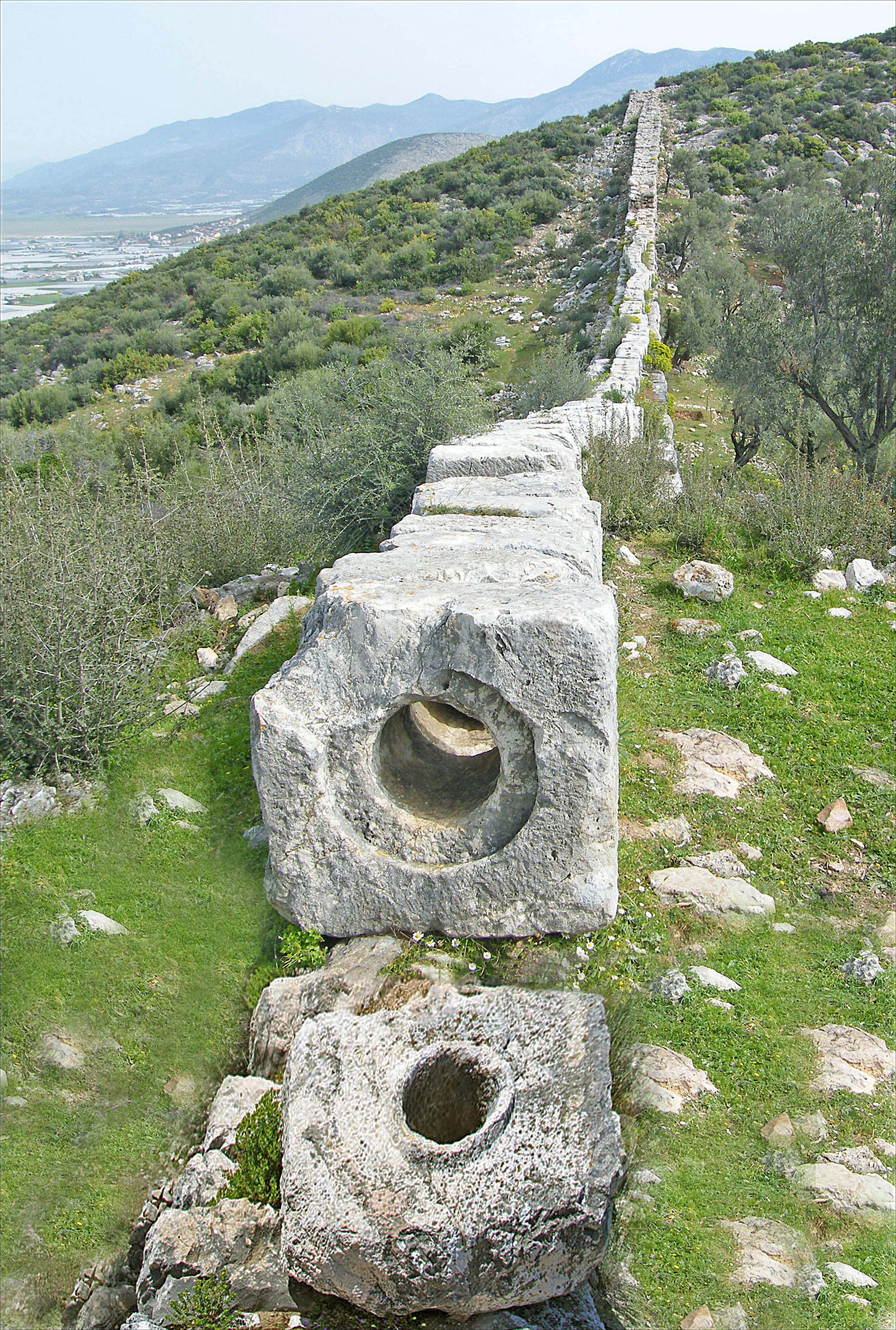
Part of the Patara aqueduct, showing the stone pipes

In October 1841 he was joined by the naturalist Edward Forbes, and they travelled together for the next two months. Hoskyn described the aqueduct supplying Patara, with its stone pipes. They then travelled inland, and explored and described the ruins of a site known in Turkish as Urlujah, the ancient Oenoanda. Returning to the Beacon, the travellers found that she was at Makri, modern Fethiye, taking on board the marbles from Xanthos which are now in the British Museum.

Admiralty Chart of Lough Carlingford, surveyed by Hoskyn in 1857

In 1843, Hoskyn moved to Ireland, becoming Assistant-Surveyor to George Frazer on HMS Comet. He worked on the Irish survey until 1862, being in charge of the survey from 1853. He compiled sailing directions for the coasts of Ireland. In 1862 he took command of HMS Porcupine, making deep soundings off the west coast of Ireland, in order to find the best route for the Transatlantic telegraph cable. Earlier surveys had found a precipitous drop from the 100 fathom line. Hoskyn succeeded in finding a more suitable route to the west of Slyne Head. The soundings and dredgings on this voyage brought up a number of interesting specimens of Brachiopods, including one new species, Discina atlantica, now named Pelagodiscus atlanticus, from 1,240 fathoms (2,270 m).

Hoskyn was promoted to Commander in June 1863. In April 1864, he was appointed Chief Draughtsman to the Hydrographic Office. In the next year he became Superintendent of Charts. He retired with the rank of Captain, and died in 1873.
