= HMS Lightning (1823) =

Royal Navy steamboat and research vessel, launched in 1823

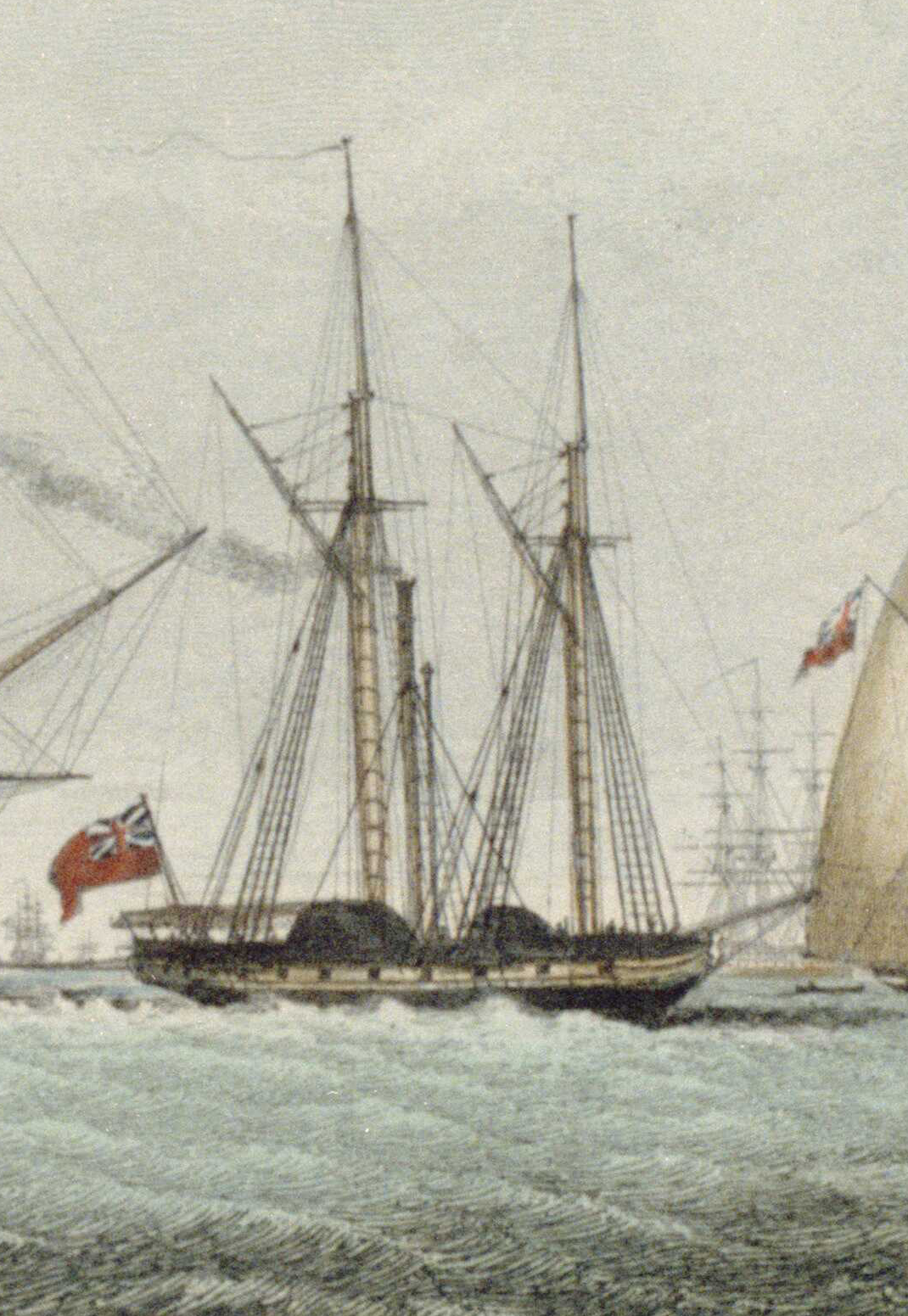
HMS Lightning, 1827

HMS Lightning, launched in 1823, was a paddle steamer, one of the first steam-powered ships on the British Royal Navy List. She served initially as a packet ship, but was later converted into an oceanographic survey vessel.

In 1835, Lightning was surveying in the Irish Sea under the command of Edward Belcher. In 1836 she took part in trials conducted by Professor Barlow in the Thames Estuary to measure speed and coal consumption at different steam pressures. At lower pressures speed was reduced, but fuel economy improved, increasing range.

From 1854-1855, during the Crimean War, Lightning under the command of Bartholomew Sulivan, was engaged in reconnaissance and survey work in the Baltic. The narrow channels around the Åland Islands had never been properly surveyed, and Lightning carried out this work, and then guided the squadron carrying troops to the landing site for the successful assault on the fortress of Bomarsund in August 1854.

From 1865-67, Lightning was commanded by Captain E.J. Bedford surveying on the west coasts of Great Britain. She was then made available to Charles Wyville Thomson and William Benjamin Carpenter for a deep-water dredging survey in the north Atlantic in 1868. This was the first of a series of scientific voyages. The later ones were in HMS Porcupine. Thomson and Carpenter had received support from the Royal Society for deep-sea explorations to test the idea of Edward Forbes that there was no life—an azoic zone—in the oceans below a few hundred fathoms. The Royal Society persuaded the Admiralty to provide a ship, Lightning for this purpose.

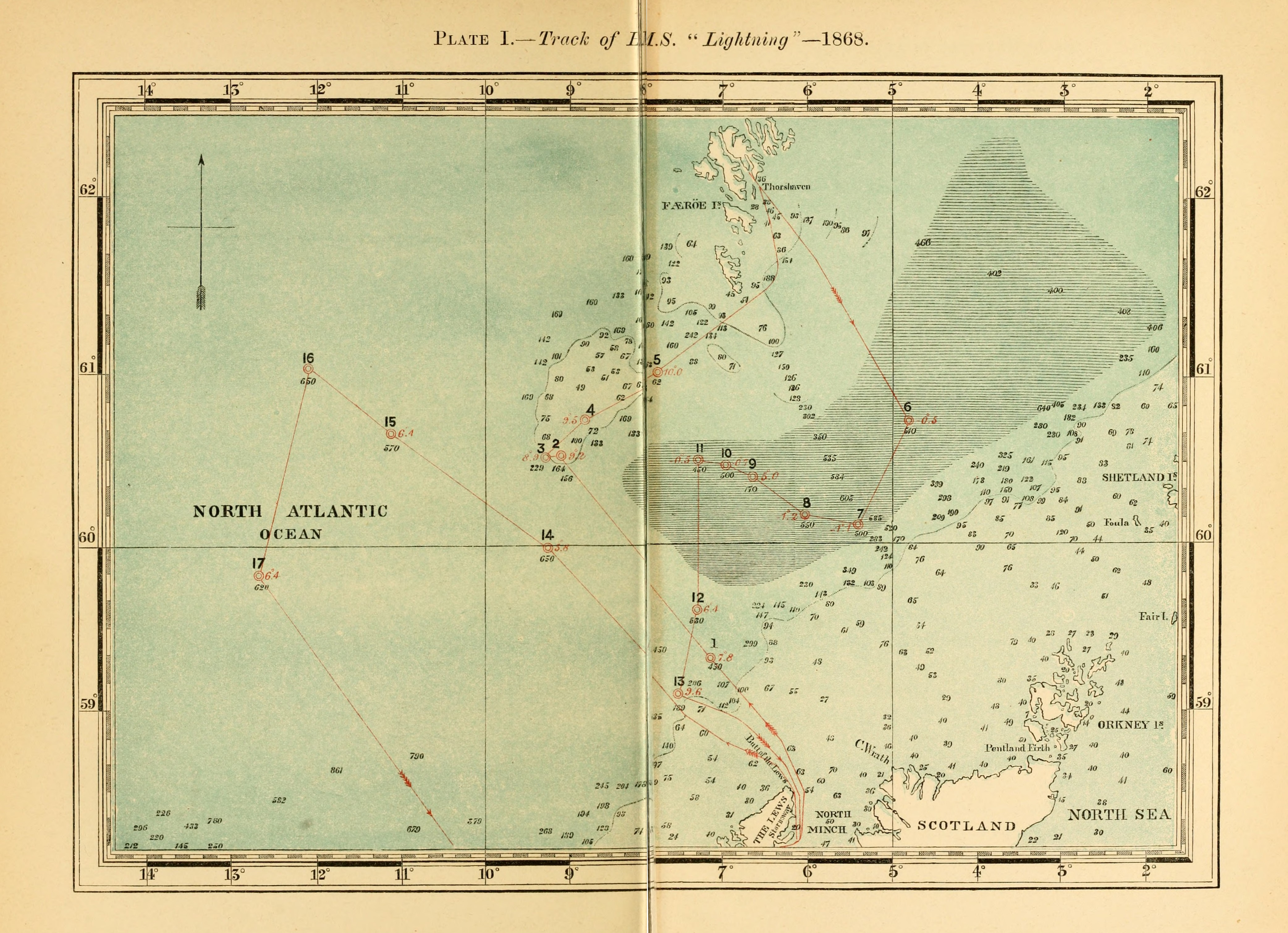
Track of HMS Lightning in 1868

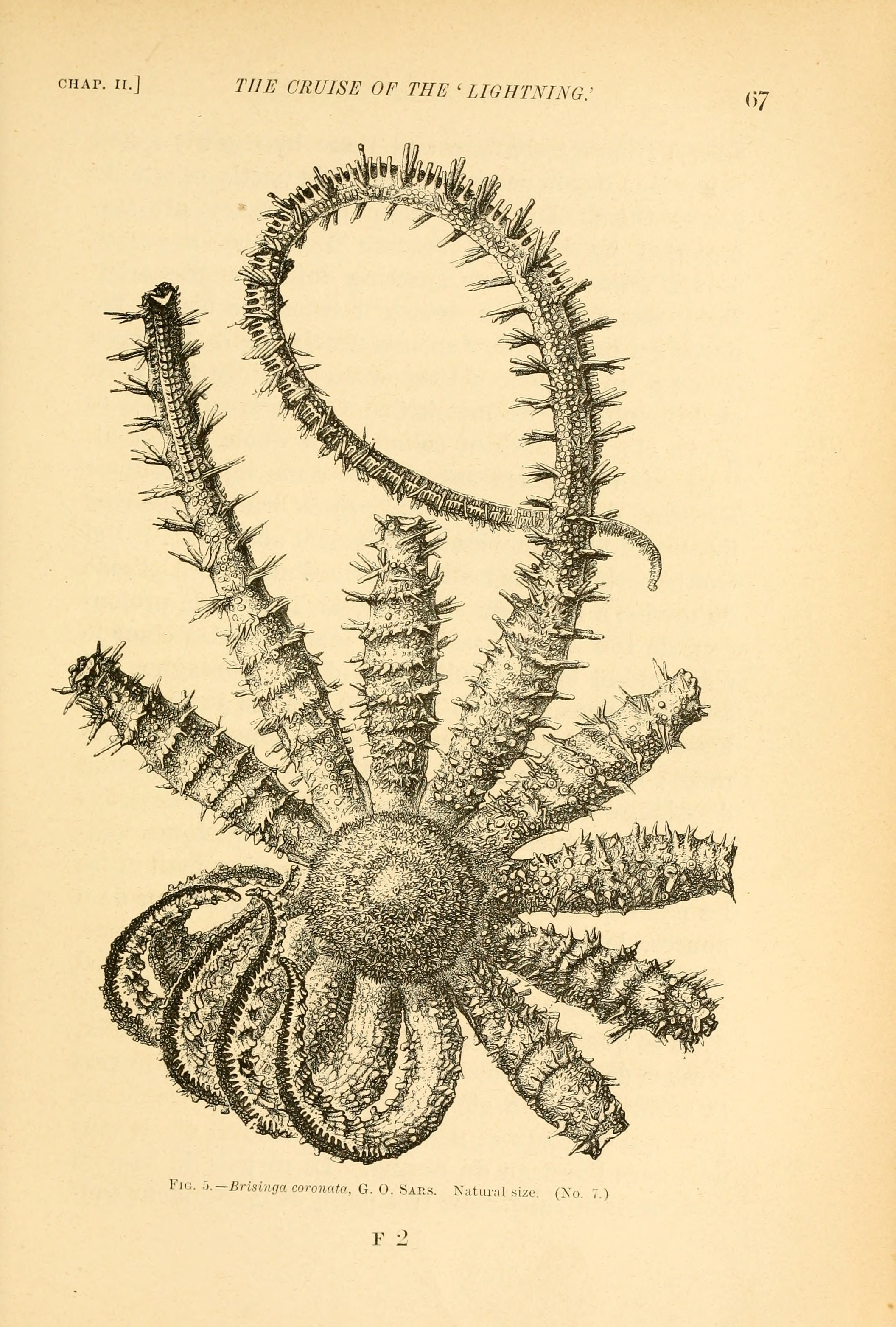
Brisinga coronata, a starfish dredged from 500 fathoms (910 m)

The voyage of Lightning in August and September 1868, under the command of Commander W.H. May, was beset by bad weather, compounded by Lightning now being an old ship. Nonetheless, important discoveries were made. The deepest dredgings, at 650 fathoms (1,190 m), found evidence of animal life. Measurements of temperature dispelled the previous idea of a constant 4°C at great depths, with both colder and warmer temperatures found, suggesting deep ocean currents. Many previously unknown species were found. These findings led to continued support from the Royal Society and the Admiralty for further deep-sea exploration.

Lightning was then employed in surveying the west coast of Great Britain under the command of J. Richards. She was broken up in 1872.
