= Bathycrinus carpenterii =

Scientific classification
- Kingdom: Animalia
- Phylum: Echinodermata
- Class: Crinoidea
- Superorder: Articulata
- Order: Comatulida
- Family: Bathycrinidae
- Genus: Bathycrinus
- Species: B. carpenterii

Binomial name
- Bathycrinus carpenterii (Danielssen & Koren, 1877)

Synonyms
- Bathycrinus carpenteri (Danielssen & Koren, 1877); Ilycrinus carpenterii Danielssen & Koren, 1877

Species of crinoid

Bathycrinus carpenterii is a species of sea lily, a crinoid in the family Bathycrinidae. It is native to the North Atlantic. It was described by Danielssen & Koren.

The species name honors Dr. William Benjamin Carpenter.
