= Bathycrinus australocrucis =

Scientific classification
- Domain: Eukaryota
- Kingdom: Animalia
- Phylum: Echinodermata
- Class: Crinoidea
- Order: Comatulida
- Family: Bathycrinidae
- Genus: Bathycrinus
- Species: B. australocrucis

Binomial name
- Bathycrinus australocrucis McKnight, 1973

Species of crinoid

Bathycrinus australocrucis is a species of sea lily, a crinoid in the family Bathycrinidae. It is native to the New Zealand region. It was described by D. G. McKnight.

== Distribution ==
Bathycrinus australocrucis is found in the Tasman Sea east of New Zealand in a depth range between 693 and 838 metres (2,274 and 2,749 ft).
