= HMS Pandora (1833) =

Brig of the Royal Navy

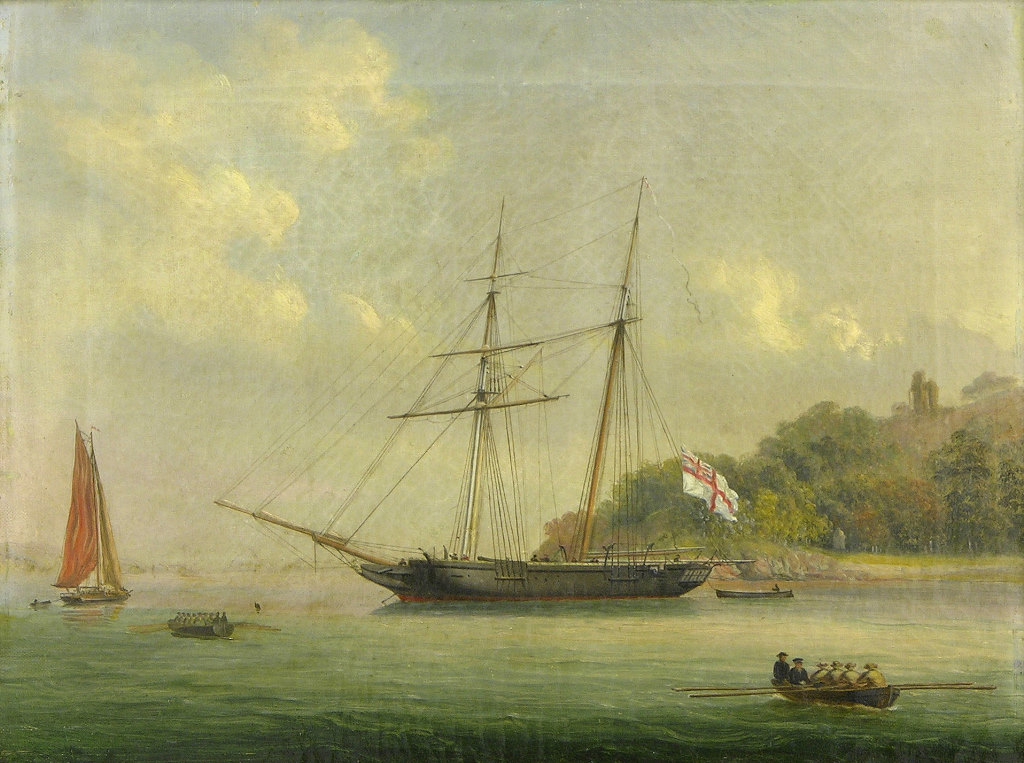
- Pandora in 1861, painted by Thomas Lyde Hornbrook

History

United Kingdom
- Name: HMS Pandora
- Ordered: 11 December 1831
- Builder: Woolwich Dockyard
- Cost: £7,821
- Laid down: August 1832
- Launched: 5 July 1833
- Commissioned: 1 June 1836
- Reclassified: Converted to survey ship 1845
- Fate: Sold January 1862

General characteristics
- Class & type: Pandora-class brig
- Tons burthen: 318 68/94 tons bm
- Length: 90 ft (27.4 m) (overall); 71 ft 3 in (21.7 m) (keel)
- Beam: 29 ft 3 in (8.9 m)
- Depth of hold: 13 ft 10 in (4.22 m)
- Propulsion: Sails
- Complement: 50 (later 60)
- Armament: 2 × 32-pounder carronades; 1 × 32-pounder gun

HMS Pandora was a 3-gun brig of the Royal Navy, in service from 1833 to 1862.

Map of the Cape of Good Hope with soundings made by Pandora in 1851

Between 1845 and 1848 Pandora, under the command of James Wood, was used as a tender to HMS Herald. During this time she was involved in survey work on the west coast of the Americas from Colombia to Vancouver Island.

From 20 December 1850 to 5 June 1856 her captain was Commander Byron Drury, under whose command she spent four and a half years surveying the New Zealand coast.

- Soundings made off the Cape of Good Hope at the Agulhas Bank in 1851.
- Took part in the survey work of New Zealand between 1851 and 1855. This work, together with that of HMS Acheron between 1848 and 1851, led to publication of the New Zealand Pilot.
- In December 1854, surveyed Sumner Bay, including the bar and mouth of the Avon-Heathcote Estuary, for the Canterbury Provincial Council. Drury wrote a report and produced a detailed chart of the area, with soundings.

Thomas Kerr was her sailing master.
