= Discolocrinus thieli =

Scientific classification
- Kingdom: Animalia
- Phylum: Echinodermata
- Class: Crinoidea
- Order: Comatulida
- Family: Bathycrinidae
- Genus: Discolocrinus
- Species: D. thieli

Binomial name
- Discolocrinus thieli Mironov, 2008

Species of crinoid

Discolocrinus thieli is a species of sea lily, a crinoid in the family Bathycrinidae. It is native to the eastern Pacific Ocean. It was described by A. N. Mironov. It is named in honor of deep sea ecologist Hjalmar Thiel.

== Description ==
Discolocrinus thieli is described from fragments retrieved by the RV Sonne in 1992. It has a low, funnel shaped calyx. None of the arms were complete with the longest fragment being 46 millimetres (1.8 in). The overall length of the fragments is 404 millimetres (15.9 in). It is attached to the substrate by an expanded terminal columnal with two short, flattened rootlets to reinforce the attachment.

== Distribution ==
Discolocrinus thieli is found in south-by-southeast of the Galapagos Islands, and west of Paita, Peru at a depth of 4,131 metres (13,553 ft).
