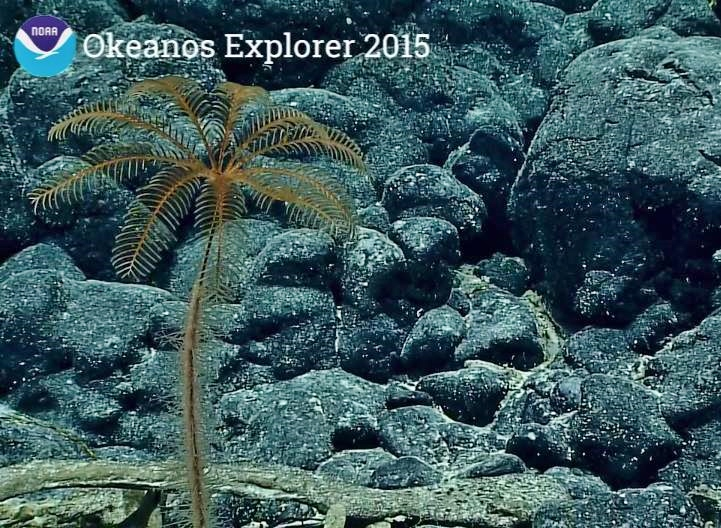
- An unidentified bathycrinid from Pacific ocean

Scientific classification
- Kingdom: Animalia
- Phylum: Echinodermata
- Class: Crinoidea
- Order: Comatulida
- Suborder: Bourgueticrinina
- Family: Bathycrinidae; Bather, 1899

= Bathycrinidae =

Family of crinoids

Bathycrinidae is a family of echinoderms in the class Crinoidea. It contains the following genera and species:

- Bathycrinus Wyville Thomson, 1872
  - Bathycrinus aldrichianus Wyville Thomson, 1877
  - Bathycrinus australis AH Clark, 1907
  - Bathycrinus australocrucis McKnight, 1973
  - Bathycrinus carpenterii (Danielssen & Koren, 1877)
  - Bathycrinus gracilis Wyville Thomson, 1877
  - Bathycrinus mendeleevi Mironov, 2008
- Discolocrinus Mironov, 2008
  - Discolocrinus thieli Mironov, 2008
- Monachocrinus AH Clark, 1919
  - Monachocrinus aotearoa McKnight, 1973
  - Monachocrinus caribbeus (AH Clark, 1908)
  - Monachocrinus mortenseni Gislén, 1938
  - Monachocrinus paradoxus (AH Clark, 1909)
  - Monachocrinus recuperatus (Perrier, 1885)
  - Monachocrinus sexradiatus AH Clark, 1919
- Naumachocrinus
  - Naumachocrinus hawaiiensis AH Clark, 1973
