= Bathycrinus aldrichianus =

Scientific classification
- Kingdom: Animalia
- Phylum: Echinodermata
- Class: Crinoidea
- Superorder: Articulata
- Order: Comatulida
- Family: Bathycrinidae
- Genus: Bathycrinus
- Species: B. aldrichianus

Binomial name
- Bathycrinus aldrichianus Thomson, 1876

Synonyms
- B. campbellianus P.H. Carpenter, 1884; B. serratus A.H. Clark, 1908

Species of crinoid

Bathycrinus aldrichianus is a species of sea lily, a crinoid in the family Bathycrinidae. It is native to deep water in the North Atlantic Ocean. It was first described by the Scottish marine zoologist Charles Wyville Thomson (who had been chief scientist on the Challenger Expedition) and named in honour of Pelham Aldrich, a British naval officer and explorer. It is believed to be the crinoid living at the greatest depth.

== Description ==
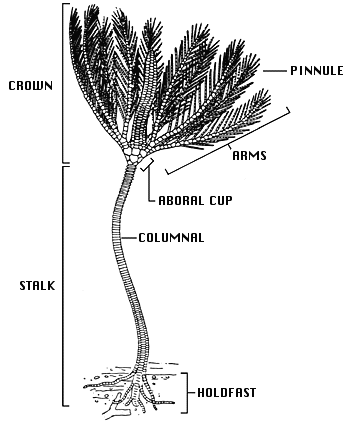
Anatomy of a stalked crinoid attached to the sea bottom, a sea lily

Bathycrinus aldrichianus is a ten-armed sea lily, the first and second arms, the fourth and fifth, and the seventh and eighth having syzygies (being joined together at the base). The arms are connected to the base ring of the crown and consist of a series of jointed rectangular plates with ribs on the exterior surface. The stem usually has twelve or more columnals (stem portions) but sometimes has rather fewer, with a minimum of five. It is attached to the substrate by elongated, jointed cylindrical plates that spread out in a rootlike fashion. The crown is held up to 15 cm (6 in) above the sediment.

== Distribution ==
Records for this species are scattered throughout the abyssal North Atlantic from about 40°N, southward to the equator and it may perhaps exist further south than the equator; its depth range is between about 3,340 and 5,600 metres (10,960 and 18,370 ft) or 3.3 and 5.6 kilometres (2.1 and 3.5 mi). The temperature at these depths is close to 0 °C (32 °F), and this species is found in areas with slight or moderate currents.

== Behaviour ==
Because of the great depths at which this crinoid lives, its behaviour has been little studied. When observed from a submersible, the roots were immersed in the sediment, the lower two thirds of the stem were held vertically and the upper third curved and the arms opened to form a filtration fan held perpendicular to the substrate and often slightly reflexed. The oral disc was oriented down-current.
