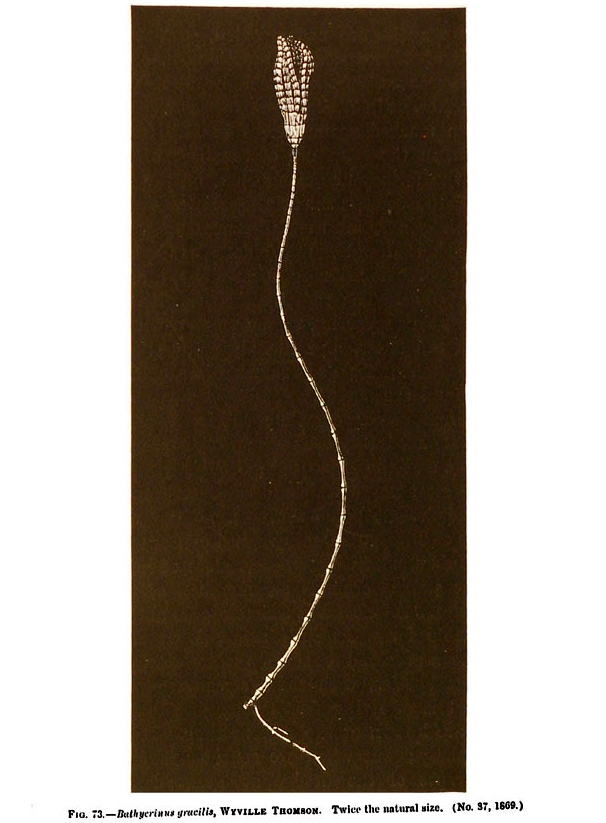
- Bathycrinus gracilis

Scientific classification
- Kingdom: Animalia
- Phylum: Echinodermata
- Class: Crinoidea
- Superorder: Articulata
- Order: Comatulida
- Family: Bathycrinidae
- Subfamily: Bathycrininae
- Genus: Bathycrinus; Thomson, 1872

Synonyms
- Ilycrinus Danielssen & Koren, 1877; Ilyocrinus Daniellsen & Koren, 1877

= Bathycrinus =

Genus of crinoids

Bathycrinus is a genus of crinoids.

== Species ==
The following species are currently recognized:

- B. aldrichianus Thomson, 1876
- B. australis AH Clark, 1907
- B. australocrucis McKnight, 1973
- B. carpenterii (Danielssen & Koren, 1877)
- B. complanatus AH Clark, 1907
- B. equatorialis AH Clark, 1908
- B. gracilis Thomson, 1872
- B. kirilli Mironov, 2019
- B. longipinnus Mironov, 2019
- B. mendeleevi Mironov, 2008
- B. pacificus AH Clark, 1907
- B. rozhnovi Mironov, 2019
- B. volubilis Mironov, 2000
- B. woodmasoni AH Clark, 1909
