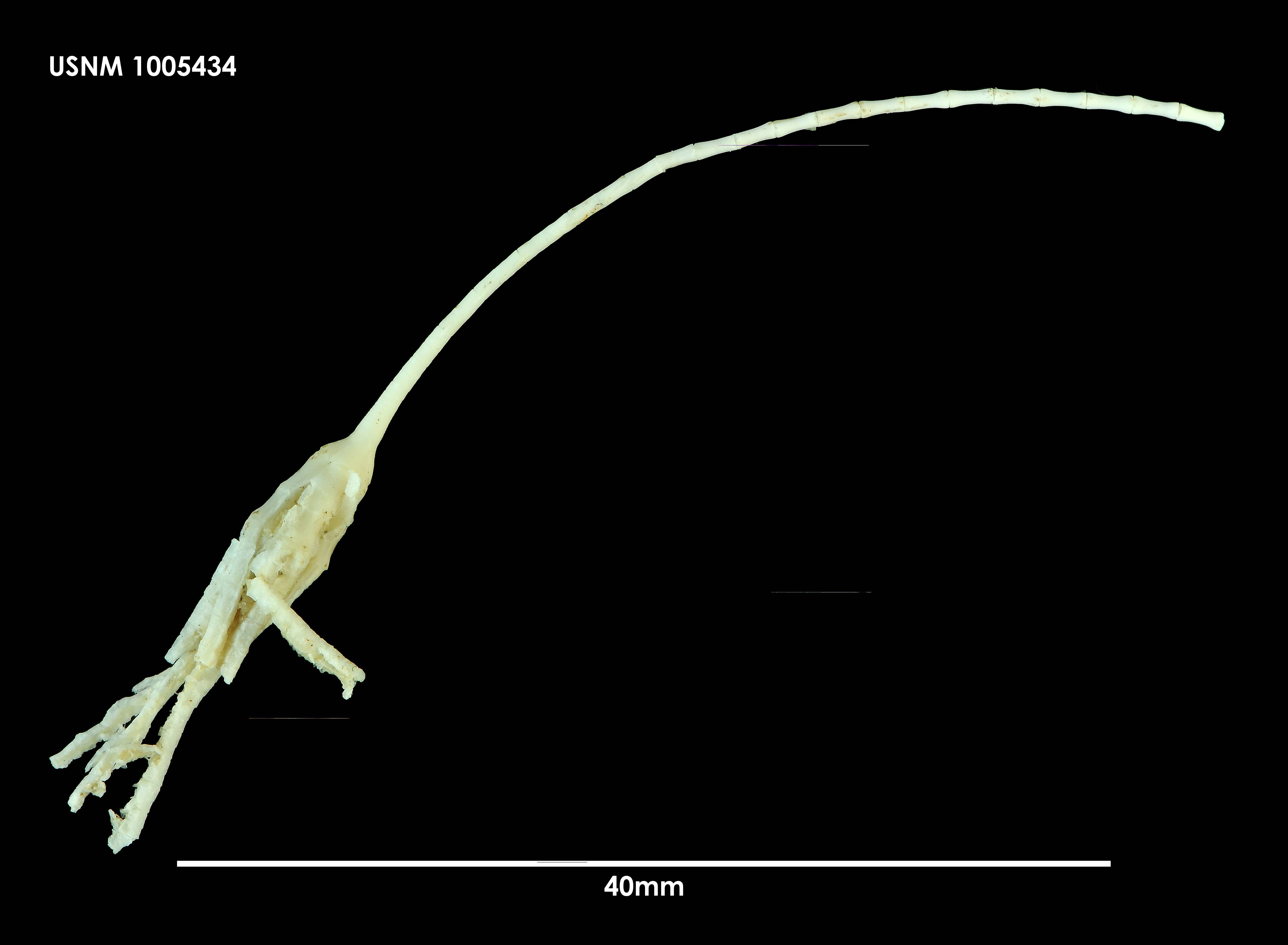

Scientific classification
- Domain: Eukaryota
- Kingdom: Animalia
- Phylum: Echinodermata
- Class: Crinoidea
- Order: Comatulida
- Family: Bathycrinidae
- Genus: Bathycrinus
- Species: B. australis

Binomial name
- Bathycrinus australis Clark, 1907

= Bathycrinus australis =

Species of sea lily

Bathycrinus australis is a species of sea lily, a crinoid in the family Bathycrinidae. It is native to deep water in the Antarctic Ocean. It was initially identified as Bathycrinus aldrichianus by Philip Herbert Carpenter following the 1872-1876 HMS Challenger expedition. It was later distinguished as a new species by the American zoologist Austin Hobart Clark.
