= Bathycrinus mendeleevi =

Scientific classification
- Domain: Eukaryota
- Kingdom: Animalia
- Phylum: Echinodermata
- Class: Crinoidea
- Order: Comatulida
- Family: Bathycrinidae
- Genus: Bathycrinus
- Species: B. mendeleevi

Binomial name
- Bathycrinus mendeleevi Mironov, 2008

Species of crinoid

Bathycrinus mendeleevi is a species of sea lily, a crinoid in the family Bathycrinidae. It is native to the Pacific Ocean west of South America. It was described by A. N. Mironov.

== Distribution ==
Bathycrinus mendeleevi is found in the Peru-Chile Trench in a depth range between 4,800 and 4,950 metres (15,750 and 16,240 ft).
