= HMS Porcupine (1844) =

British survey ship

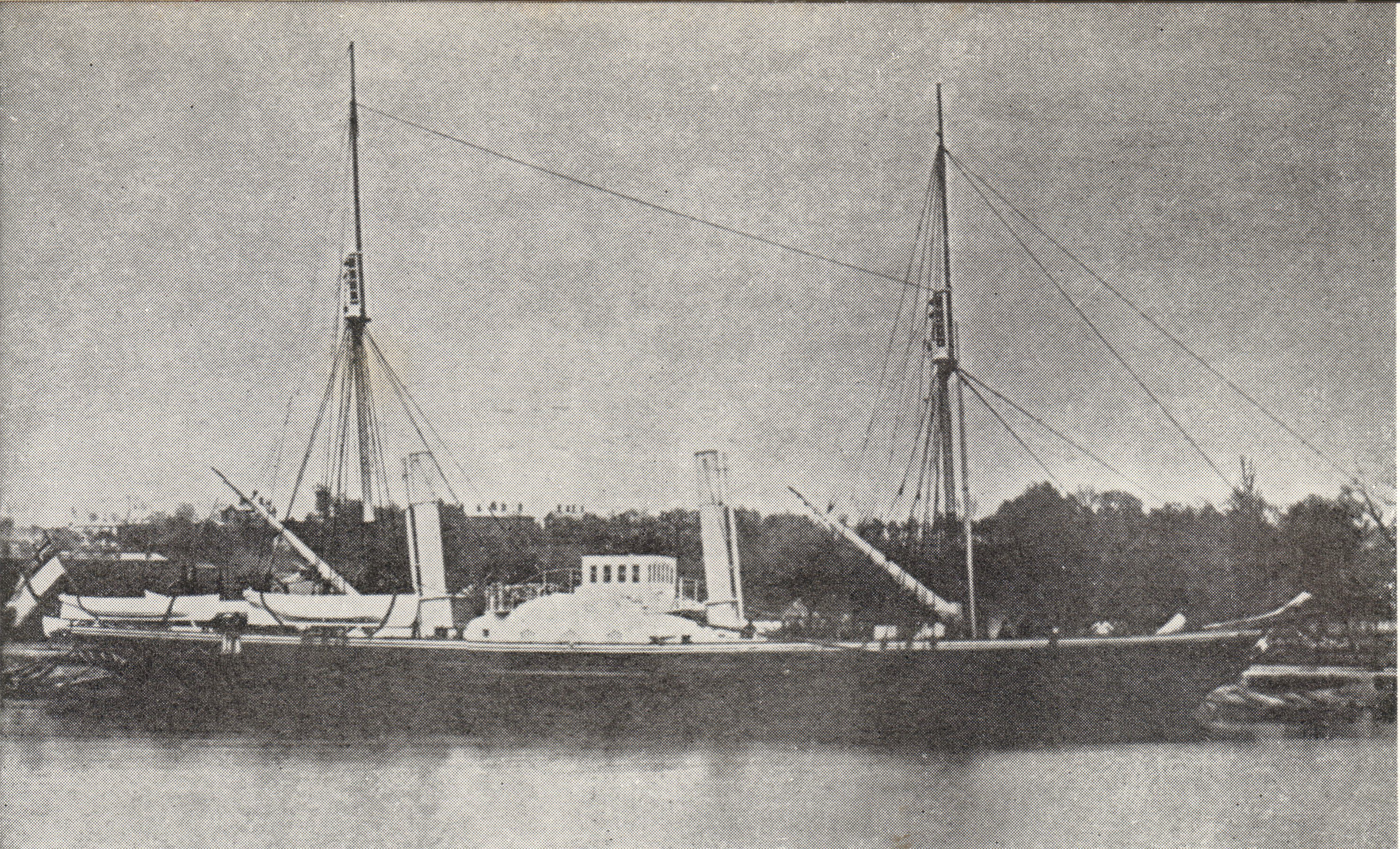
- HMS Porcupine

History

United Kingdom
- Name: HMS Porcupine
- Ordered: 11 November 1843
- Builder: Deptford Dockyard
- Cost: Hull £7,997, fitting out £7,050
- Launched: 17 June 1844
- Commissioned: 19 August 1844
- Fate: Survey ship 1862; Sold 1883

General characteristics
- Class & type: Steam vessel, re-classified in 1844 as first-class steam gunvessel
- Displacement: 490 tons
- Tons burthen: 381 68/94 bm
- Length: 141 ft (43 m) (keel); 124 ft 7.5 in (37.986 m) (gundeck)
- Beam: 24 ft 1.5 in (7.353 m)
- Depth of hold: 13 ft (4.0 m)
- Installed power: 132 nominal horsepower; 285 ihp (213 kW)
- Propulsion: 2-cylinder side lever steam engine (Note: The engine was removed from HMS Black Eagle (ex Firebrand)); Tubular boilers; Single screw
- Crew: 80
- Armament: 1 × 32-pdr (26 cwt) on pivot; 2 × 32-pdr (17 cwt) carronades

HMS Porcupine was a Royal Navy 3-gun wooden paddle steamer. It was built by Oliver Lang in Deptford Dockyard in 1844 and served as a survey ship. It was first employed in the survey of the Thames Estuary by Captain Frederick Bullock.

In 1847, in common with other paddle-steamers used in surveying, Porcupine was diverted to famine relief work in Ireland and western Scotland. She then spent some time in the Mediterranean, returning to England in 1851. In the Crimean war she was commanded by Henry Charles Otter, and returned to surveying work in Scotland, still under Otter, in 1854. In 1858 she crossed the Atlantic in support of the laying of the first Atlantic cable.

In 1862 Porcupine surveyed off the west coast of Ireland under the command of Richard Hoskyn in preparation for the laying of the replacement transatlantic telegraph cable. Previous surveys had shown very steep descents at the edge of the continental shelf, but Hoskyn's work identified a suitable route to the west of Slyne Head. The primary purpose of the voyage was surveying but samples of the sea bed were brought up from considerable depths. One, from 1,240 fathoms (2,270 m), contained a shell of a new species of brachiopod. The samples also provided evidence for the processes involved in the formation of sedimentary rock.

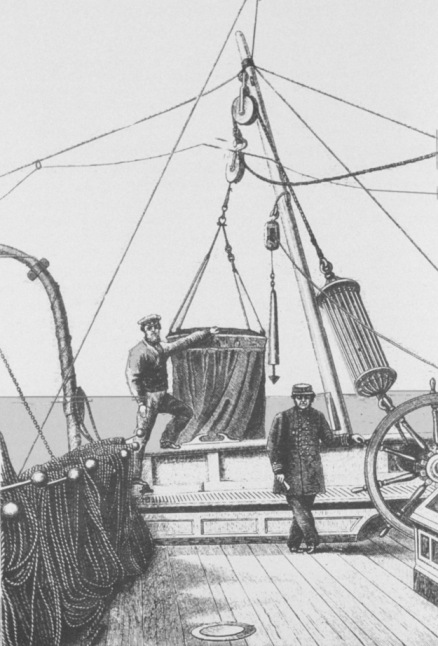
Bringing a dredge trawl back aboard HMS Porcupine, by Sir Charles Wyville Thomson

From 1863, Porcupine was commanded by Edward Killwick Calver, who was in charge of the survey of the east coast of England. In 1869 she was chartered by the Royal Society to investigate the deep sea bed to the west of Ireland with the intention of looking for living organisms below 600 m depth. The azoic theory of Edward Forbes hypothesised that life could not exist below this depth due to the great pressure. The Porcupine expedition disproved this theory by bringing up animals from 3000 m. This led to the funding of the Challenger expedition to survey deep sea around the world. The Porcupine Bank, an area of seabed to the west of Ireland partly detached from the continental shelf by a failed rift event, was discovered by this expedition and is named after this ship.

== Sources ==
- Lyon, David & Winfield, Rif (2004). The Sail and Steam Navy List: All the Ships of the Royal Navy 1815–1889. Chatham Publishing. ISBN 978-1-86176-032-6. OCLC 52620555.
