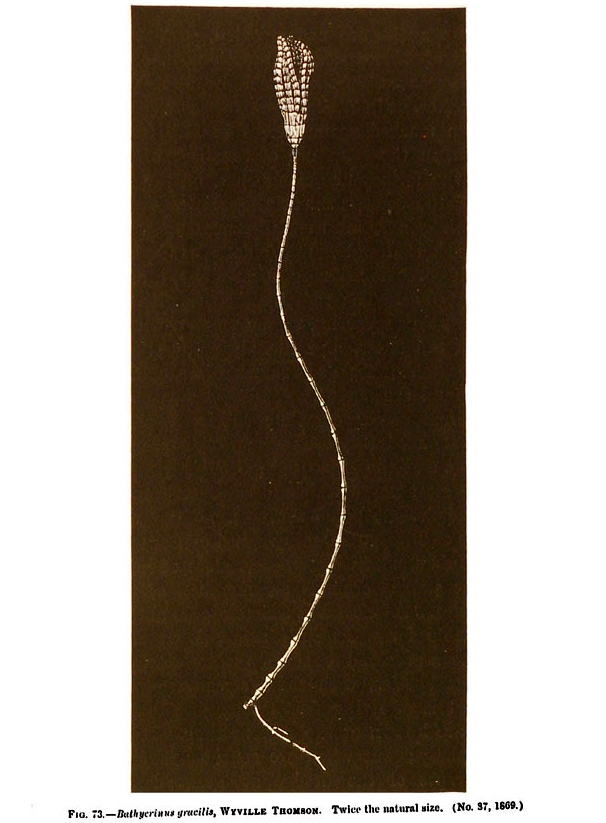

Scientific classification
- Kingdom: Animalia
- Phylum: Echinodermata
- Class: Crinoidea
- Superorder: Articulata
- Order: Comatulida
- Family: Bathycrinidae
- Genus: Bathycrinus
- Species: B. gracilis

Binomial name
- Bathycrinus gracilis Thomson, 1877

= Bathycrinus gracilis =

Species of crinoid

Bathycrinus gracilis is a species of sea lily, a crinoid in the family Bathycrinidae. It is native to the North Atlantic. It was described by Charles Wyville Thomson.

== Distribution ==
Bathycrinus gracilis is found in the North Atlantic at a depth of around 4,456 metres (14,619 ft).
