= Charles Gepp Robinson =

British Royal Navy officer and hydrographic surveyor (1805–1875)

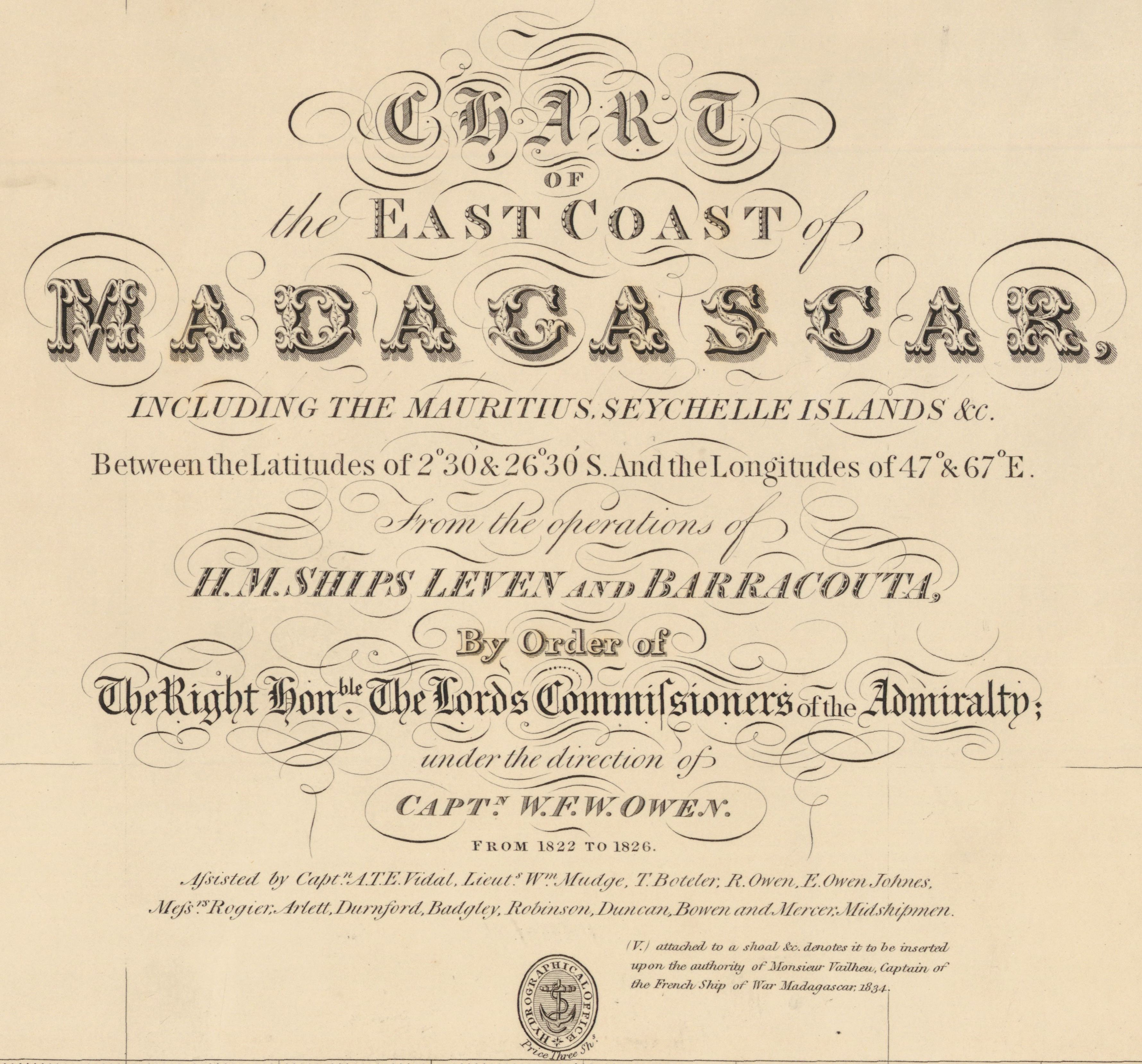
Title of Admiralty Chart No 677, one of the surveys Robinson worked on with Owen

Charles Gepp Robinson (3 December 1805 – 31 October 1875) was a Royal Navy Officer and hydrographic surveyor particularly noted for his survey work in the west of Scotland.

Robinson was born at Appledore House in Devon. He joined the Navy on 13 May 1819 on board HMS Hasty in the North Sea. His first overseas posting was with William Fitzwilliam Owen in HMS Leven from 1821-1826, surveying the east coast of Africa. The survey cost the lives of more than half of the crew due to tropical diseases, and Robinson was one of the few officers to return alive to England. He was promoted to Lieutenant in 1826, and returned to Africa with Owen in HMS Eden on a mission to establish a settlement at Fernando Po, which was believed to be healthier than other parts of West Africa. This turned out not to be true, and mortality due to fever was as high as on the previous trip, but again Robinson was one of the few to survive, as did Owen and his family who accompanied him. During his time in Africa, Robinson was active in pursuing slaving ships, capturing three of them.

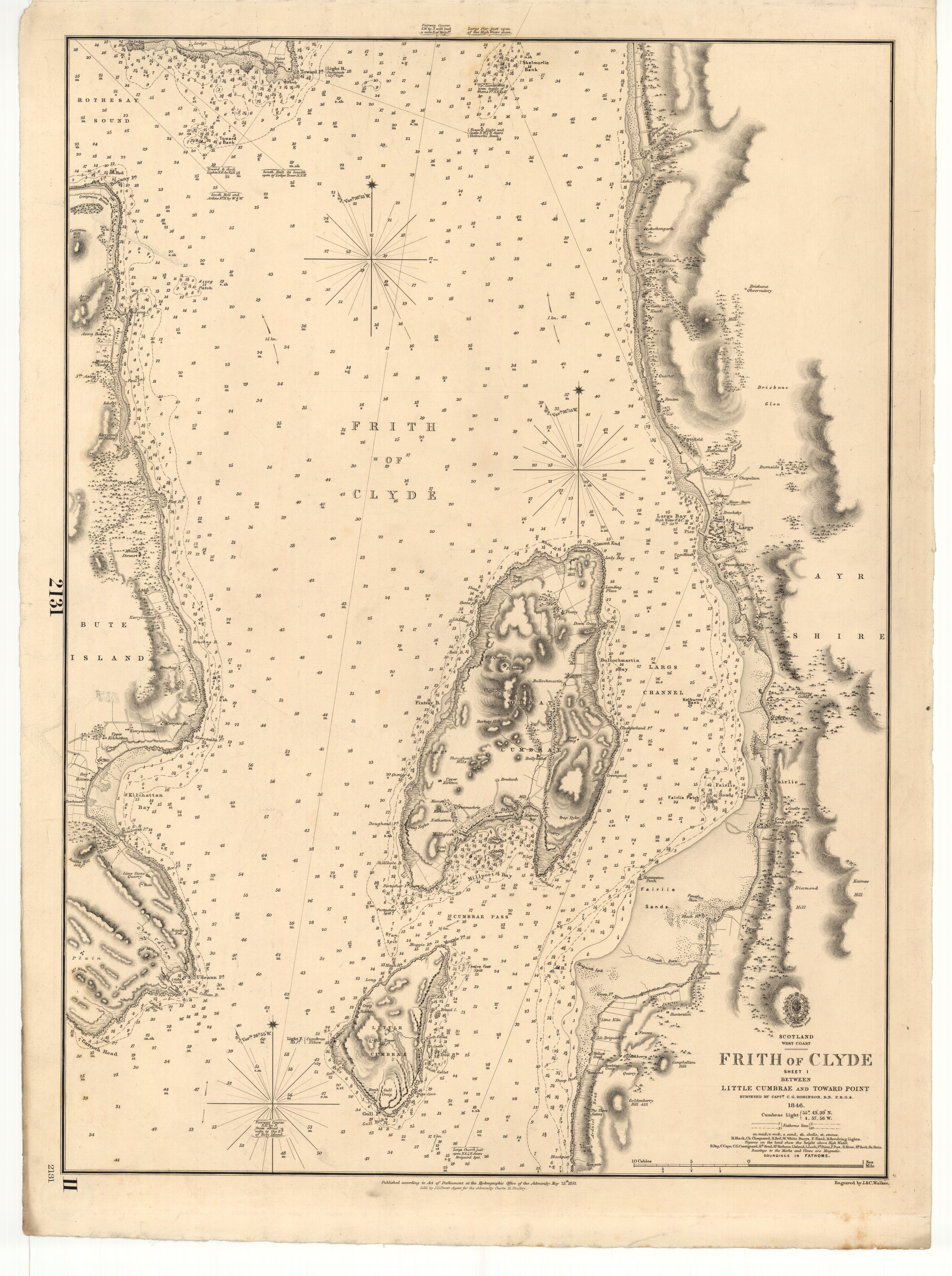
Admiralty Chart of part of the Clyde, surveyed in 1846

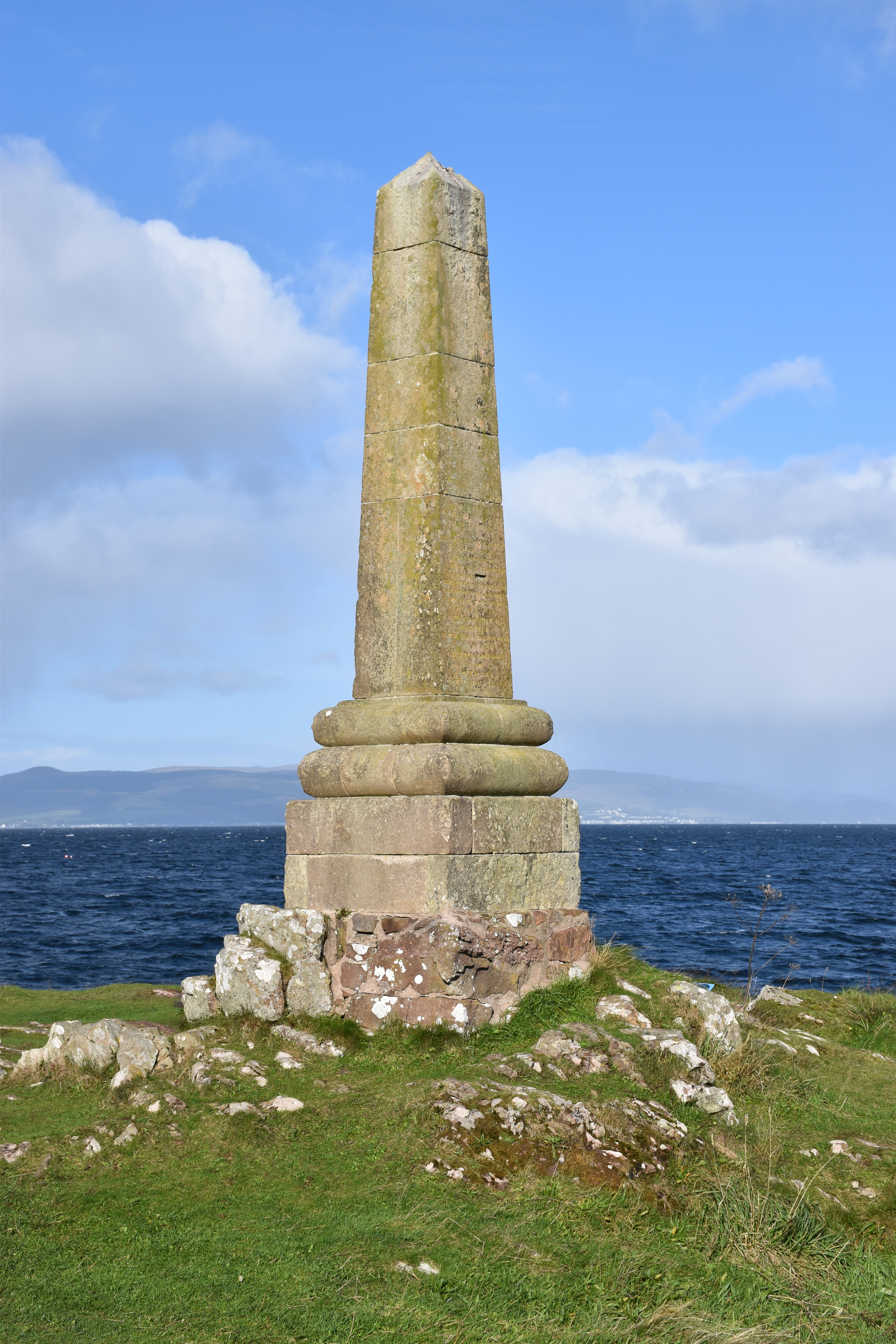
Monument to Charles Cayley and William Jewell on Great Cumbrae

From March 1829 to April 1835 he served in various ships as assistant to Henry Mangles Denham surveying the coasts of Wales and western England. He then took command of the Welsh survey after which he moved to Scotland. He was promoted to Commander in 1838, was for a short while in command of HMS Gleaner, then took command of the paddle steamer HMS Shearwater until she was transferred to famine relief work in Ireland in 1847. Robinson's surveys of Scotland covered a large part of the west coast from the Solway Firth to Oban. While surveying in the Clyde in 1844, two of Shearwater's midshipmen on a pleasure sail were drowned when a squall capsized their boat. A memorial was raised to them by Robinson and the officers of Shearwater at the north end of Great Cumbrae Island. Robinson was promoted to post-captain in 1846, and continued in the surveying service until 1854. He was appointed to HMS Ceylon in the Mediterranean in 1854, and took part in cable-laying operations. He was promoted to rear-admiral in 1864 and to vice-admiral in 1871.

A memorial in St. Michael's churchyard of Dumfries recorded the deaths of two young sons of Charles Gepp Robinson, with the inscription: "Rest, my beloved boys. You were called away ere this world's sin could tarnish your bright hue". No date is given, nor are the boys' names. In 1860 Robinson was recorded as living in Oban. He had one surviving daughter, Julia Isabella. He died on 31 October 1875
