= John Washington (Royal Navy officer) =

English naval officer and hydrographer

Rear-Admiral John Washington FRS FRGS
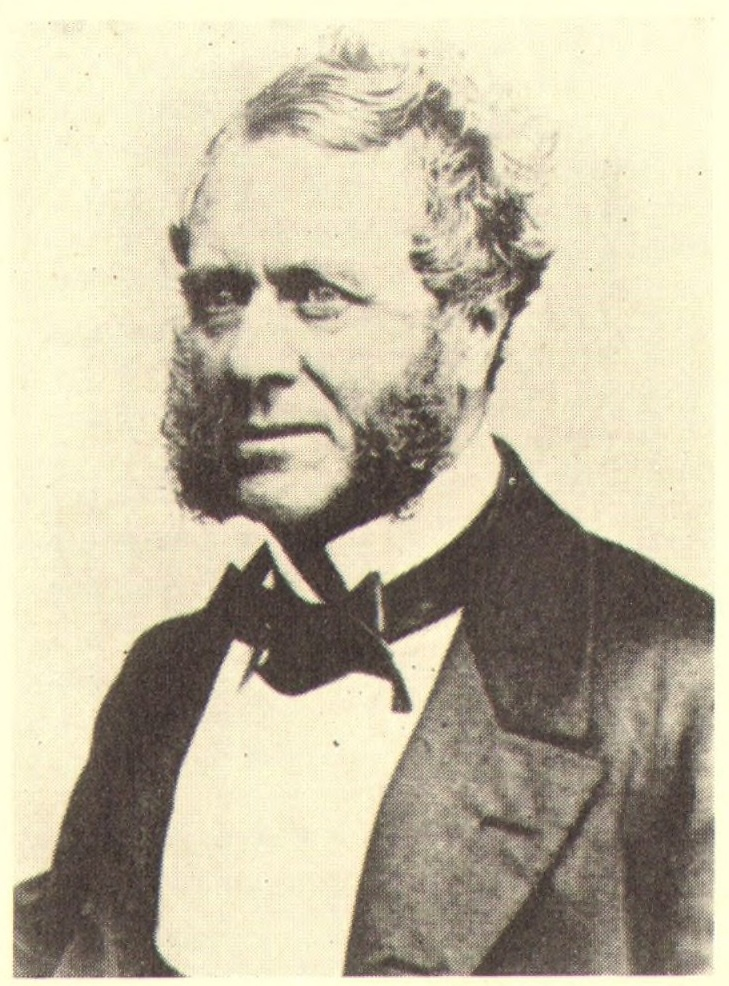

Hydrographer of the Navy
- In office 29 January 1855 – 16 September 1863
- Preceded by: Sir Francis Beaufort
- Succeeded by: Sir George Richards

Secretary of the Royal Geographical Society
- In office 23 May 1836 – 16 March 1841
- Preceded by: Alexander Maconochie
- Succeeded by: Julian Jackson

Personal details
- Born: 1 January 1800 Crondall, Hampshire, England
- Died: 16 September 1863 (aged 63) Le Havre, Normandy, France
- Spouse: Eleonora Askew (m. 1833)
- Occupation: Hydrographer, geographer
- Known for: Co-founder of the Royal Geographical Society

Military service
- Branch: Royal Navy
- Service years: 1812–1863
- Rank: Rear-Admiral
- Wars: Napoleonic Wars; War of 1812

John Washington FRS FRGS (1 January 1800 – 16 September 1863) was an officer of the Royal Navy, Hydrographer of the Navy, and a founding member of the Royal Geographical Society of London.

== Early career ==
Washington joined the Royal Navy in May 1812, and served aboard HMS Junon with Sir George Cockburn's fleet in Chesapeake Bay, seeing much action in the War of 1812. From October 1813, he was aboard HMS Sybille, which was sent to cruise off Greenland in 1814. On this voyage, he learnt much about astronomical and magnetic observations from the Master of the ship, William Bain (Later Sir William). He joined the Royal Naval Academy in November 1814, and graduated in May 1816. He then served for three years aboard HMS Forth on the North American Station, and afterwards as midshipman aboard HMS Vengeur and HMS Superb on the South American Station. He was promoted to lieutenant on 1 January 1821, while based at Valparaíso. He obtained permission to return to England by his own route, and took the track later followed by Darwin riding over the Andes to Mendoza and then across the pampas to Buenos Aires.

He was appointed to HMS Parthian in February 1823, serving in the West Indies, after which he spent two years on half-pay. He spent this time travelling in France, Spain, and Italy, and improving his knowledge of the languages of these countries. In May 1827, he was appointed to serve on HMS Weazel in the Mediterranean, and in December, was moved to HMS Dartmouth, returning to Britain in early 1828. During the winter of 1829-1830 he was exploring and making astronomical observations in Morocco, publishing an account of his travels in 1831. From 1830 to 1833, he was flag lieutenant to Sir John Beresford, Commander-in-Chief, The Nore, and on 14 August 1833, Washington was promoted to the rank of commander. He was one of the original members of the Royal Geographical Society and served as its secretary from 1836 to 1841. In 1838 he published an account of Mohammedu-Siseï, a Mandingo from The Gambia, who had been enslaved, freed, and served as a soldier in the West Indian Regiment. Washington met him in London, and his account describes aspects of Islamic religion and culture in the West Indies.

== Surveying ==
Admiralty Chart No 2182 The North Sea sheet II, surveyed by Captains Hewett and Washington

Washington's surveying career began in March 1841 with his first command, the paddle steamer HMS Shearwater. He took over the North Sea survey after the death of William Hewett, whose ship HMS Fairy was lost with all hands in a storm in 1840. In January 1842, he was temporarily lent to the yacht HMS Black Eagle, which was appointed to bring Frederick William IV of Prussia to England. Washington was made captain on 16 March 1842. In January 1843, he was moved to another paddler, HMS Blazer, in which he continued the survey of the east coast of England until 1847. An important part of Washington's work in the North Sea was confirming Hewett's observation of a point with neither rise nor fall of the tide. This had been predicted by William Whewell, and is now known as an amphidromic point. The east coast of England is characterised by many shifting channels in shallow waters. An example is The New Stanford Channel near Lowestoft, a new channel useful for navigation, which Washington documented in 1843.

== Harbours and safety at sea ==
Washington's surveying on the east coast included work on harbours. In 1844 he published an account of the changes that had occurred at Harwich, including accelerating encroachment of the sea on the western side of the harbour entrance, with resulting changes in currents and silting up of useful approach channels. He attributed this to the quarrying of cement stone from the cliffs, estimating that at least a million tons had been removeds since 1812. He recommended remedies including abolition of quarrying and the construction of a breakwater. He was one of the commissioners appointed to investigate the subject of harbours of refuge, and in January 1845 he was appointed a commissioner for inquiring into the state of the rivers, shores, and harbours of the United Kingdom. In February of the same year he was elected a Fellow of the Royal Society. After completing his work in the North Sea, he was employed in the railway and harbour department of the admiralty.

In August 1848 a gale caused the loss or damage of 124 fishing boats and the loss of 100 lives in the N.E. of Scotland. Washington was asked to investigate the disaster, and the Report on the loss of life, and damage caused to fishing boats on the East Coast of Scotland, in the gale of 19th August 1848 was published the following year. The report was concerned both with harbours and boats. It noted the lack of any deep water harbour to which a ship could run when overtaken by a storm even at half tide. At Wick as the storm increased towards midnight on 18 August, many of the hundreds of fishing boats in the bay ran for the harbour and got in safely around high water (about 01:30). By the time the storm was at its worst, between 3 and 5 o'clock in the morning of the 19th, the water had fallen to half tide, and it was impossible to enter the harbour safely. Some attempted it with the loss of 25 lives; a further 12 men drowned when their boats were swamped at sea. The report contains detailed descriptions of the fishing ports between Wick and Helmsdale, as well as Fraserburgh and Peterhead, with recommendations for improvements. It also considers issues of boat design, in particular the use of open boats, which are more at risk of swamping than decked boats. The report includes diagrams of the main types of fishing boats in use in various parts of Britain. Following the report, the use of decked vessels was encouraged, and became generally accepted by the late 1860s.

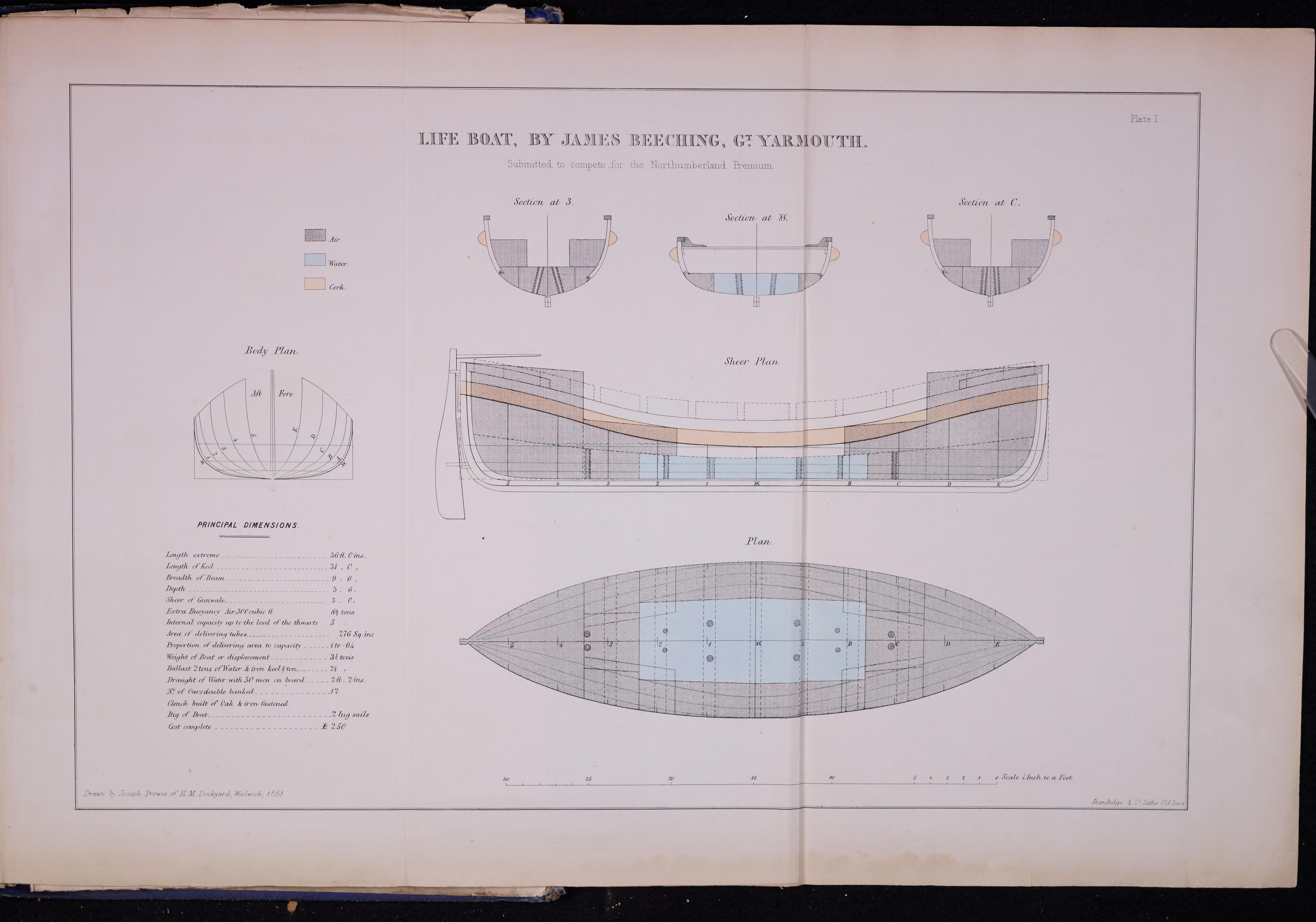
James Beeching's winning design for a self-righting life-boat

In 1850, supported by the Duke of Northumberland, Washington launched a competition for the design of a new life-boat, with a prize of 100 guineas (£105). A committee was set up to judge the entries, with Washington as chairman, and produced a report the following year, which included illustrations of the most promising designs, and also a chart marking the wrecks round the coasts of Britain and Ireland in 1850. The winning design, with modifications after testing, was adopted by the National Life-Boat Institution.

== War with Russia ==
In 1853, having to visit Denmark, Sweden, and Russia to settle some matters as to an establishment of lifeboats, he was directed by Sir James Graham, then First Lord of the Admiralty, to collect what information he could as to the state of the Russian Baltic Fleet and the defences of Kronstadt, Reval, and Sveaborg. Washington carried this out, and was able to see a division of the Russian fleet at sea and observe its manœuvres. He was able to see every ship of the Russian fleet, and also collected copies of Russian nautical charts, which were later used by British and French squadrons in the War with Russia which started later that year.

During these years he had been acting as assistant to Sir Francis Beaufort, the Hydrographer of the Navy. On Beaufort's resignation in 1855, Washington was appointed as his successor. His term as hydrographer began in wartime, and the first priority, already underway while he was Beaufort's assistant, was the supply of charts, particularly to the French Navy. 70,000 more charts had been issued in 1854 than in 1852. The Second China War and the prospect of war with Japan led to shipments of charts of Asia.

== Commercial hydrographer ==
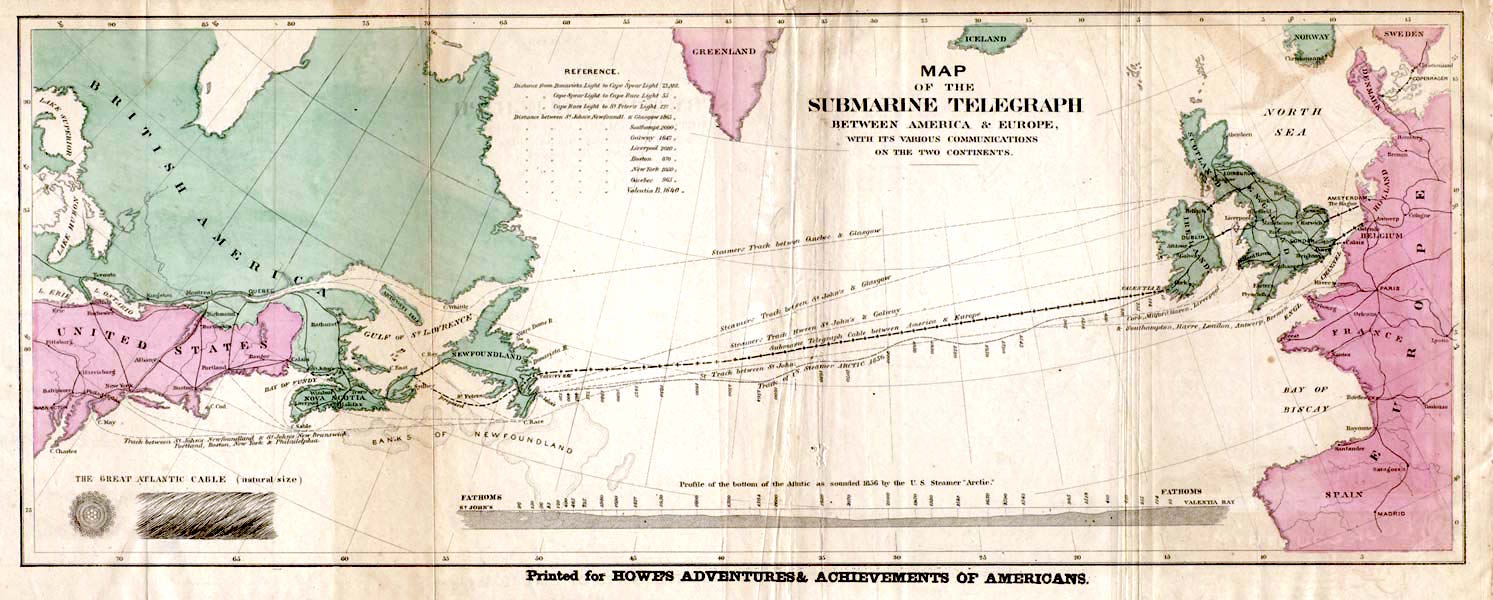
Map of the 1858 transatlantic cable route

After the war with Russia was over, Washington turned his attention to the production and sale of charts. Beaufort had insisted on personally inspecting every chart before it was published, and this had led to delays and a backlog of unpublished charts. Washington accepted the need for careful review, but delegated this work to naval assistants, initially to Captain A.B. Becher, then increasingly to more junior assistants. Chart production and distribution were also re-organised, printing being outsourced to Messrs. Malby and Sons, and the sale of charts by agents and the updating and correction of stock regularised. In the 1864 catalogue, 2,500 charts were listed, a 20 percent increase since 1855. Sales revenue also increased. Surveying activity was also increased, with more surveys ongoing than at any time before or since. A new initiative during this period was deep-sea sounding in preparation for the laying of long-distance telegraph cables. The first submarine communications cable had been laid between Dover and Calais in 1850, but cables beyond the continental shelf presented much greater difficulties. Several possible routes for transatlantic telegraph cable were surveyed by Lieutenant Dayman, though the first successful cable was not laid until after Washington's death.

== Naval organisation ==
Washington pioneered a major change in naval organisation concerning the role of Masters. These trained specialists were responsible for the navigation of all but the smallest ships, but although they had great responsibility, and were sometimes in command of ships, they were not of officer rank. Although a few masters did become officers, there was no accepted promotion path. The reforms advocated by Washington led to the creation of a new officer rank of Navigating Lieutenant, and over a period all masters were transferred to this rank or became staff commanders.

== Zambezi expedition ==
Washington gave considerable assistance to David Livingstone's Zambezi expedition of 1858-1864, providing personnel and craft, and there was frequent correspondence between him and Livingstone during the expedition.

== Death and funeral ==
Washington was promoted to the rank of rear-admiral on 12 April 1862. In the following year he became ill, and travelled to Le Havre, then to Switzerland. He returned to Le Havre and died there. Many at the time believed that his illness and death were the result of overwork and worry about accusations in the press that failings in the hydrographic office had led to the loss of HMS Orpheus in New Zealand. His funeral in Le Havre, on 19 September was attended by French civil, and military representatives as well as by British seamen and townspeople.
