= William Hewett (died 1840) =

William Hewett was a Royal Navy officer noted for making the first comprehensive survey of the North Sea and for his work on tides.

Chart of the Coasts of Brazil incorporating Hewett's survey work

Hewett went to sea in HMS Indefatigable first in the war with France, from 1805 to 1811, and in China in 1811. He then joined HMS Cornwall as midshipman. From 1813 he served in HMS Inconstant, and carried out a number of surveys on the coast of Brazil, including Maranhão, Ceará and Bahia. He was made an acting Lieutenant in 1814, which was confirmed in 1815.

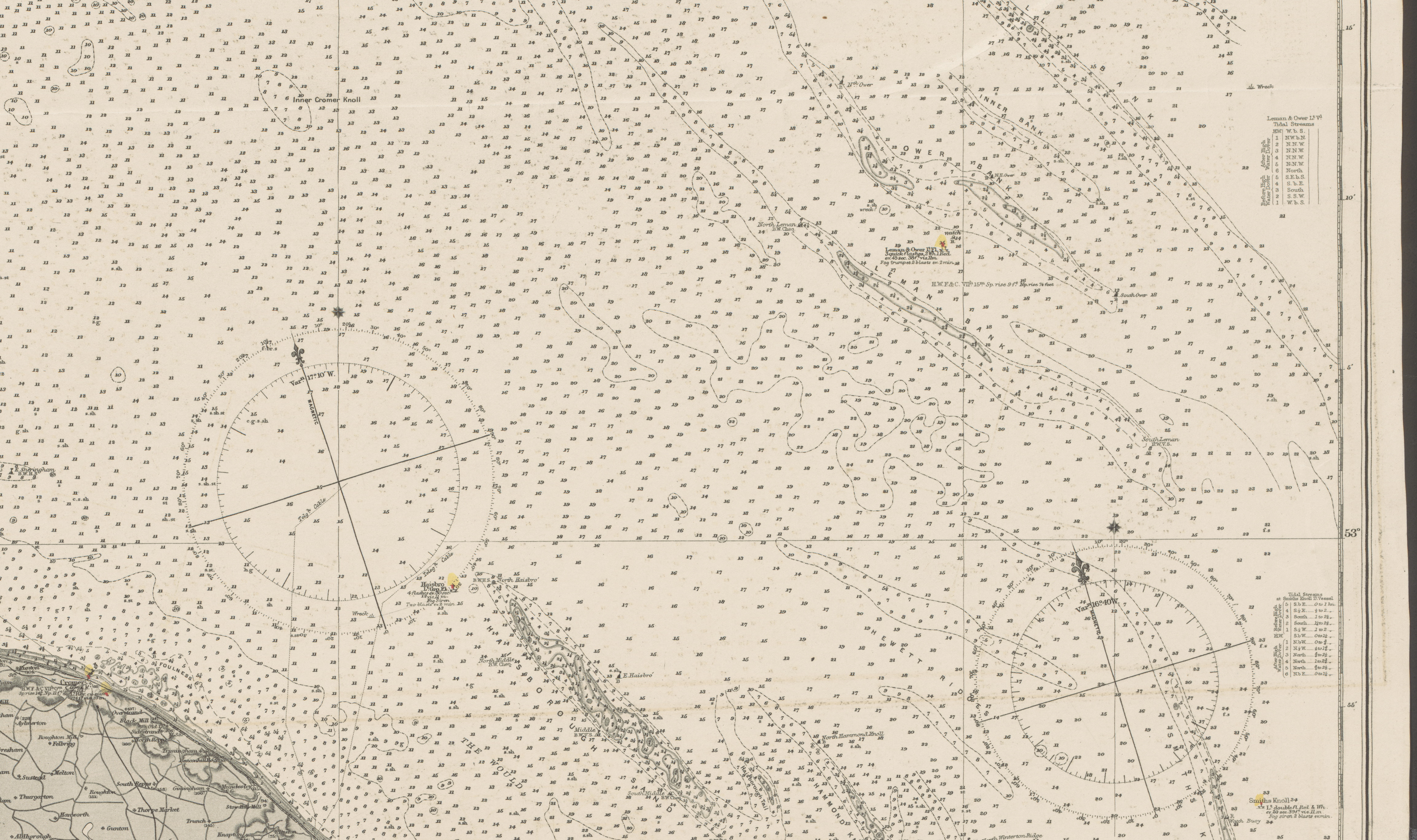
Part of Admiralty Chart No 1630 showing the Leman and Ower Shoals

Hewett's first command was the surveying vessel HMS Protector. From 1818 to 1830 he carried out surveys of the east coast of England, an area noted for dangerous and often shifting shoals. Hewett's description of the Leman and Ower banks, off the coast of Norfolk is given in full in the North Sea Sailing Directions of 1846. Other areas surveyed included Yarmouth Roads, the entrance to the Humber estuary, Lynn and Boston Deeps, The Gabbards and the Dudgeon. He also made recommendations for improvement of navigation of the coast, in particular regarding positioning of lighthouses and light vessels. He tested nautical inventions and trial compasses, reporting results to the Admiralty's committees.

In 1830, Hewett was promoted to Commander, and in 1831 took command of HMS Fairy. He began his great work of surveying the North Sea to the Dutch coast and including the Dogger Bank. Four chronometers were supplied for determining longitude. As well as normal surveying work, Hewett was engaged to test the theory of William Whewell who had suggested that between the Suffolk and Dutch coasts there should be a point at which there would be neither rise nor fall of the tide - what is now known as an amphidromic point. This involved anchoring the ship and taking repeated soundings at the same location with lead and line, precautions being needed to allow for irregularities in the sea bed, and the effects of tidal flow. The data supported Whewell's prediction, with a rise of no more than 1 foot (0.30 m).

The North Sea survey was nearing completion, when, on 13 November 1840, sailing from near Orfordness to Yarmouth, Fairy was lost with all hands in a great gale. For several days there was doubt as to her fate. Francis Beaufort, the hydrographer who had initiated the survey knew the Fairy to be a sound ship, and Hewett to be a fine seaman. He thought she might have run for shelter to Norway. A search was started and a reward was offered for information. But eventually it became clear that the ship was lost. A substantial fund was raised for the widows and children of those lost in the disaster. Hewett's widow had lost not only her husband, but a son and brother.

Admiralty Chart No 2182 The North Sea sheet II, surveyed by Captains Hewett and Washington

The data from Hewett's ten years of work on the survey, including 30,000 soundings, were safe. Captain John Washington in HMS Shearwater completed the survey, and confirmed Hewett's tidal findings. The survey of the North Sea was published as three sheets, the first, of the southern part, as Admiralty Chart No. 1406 in 1842, and sheets II and III as Chart Nos. 2182 and 2248 in 1853–4.
