= HMS Shearwater (1837) =

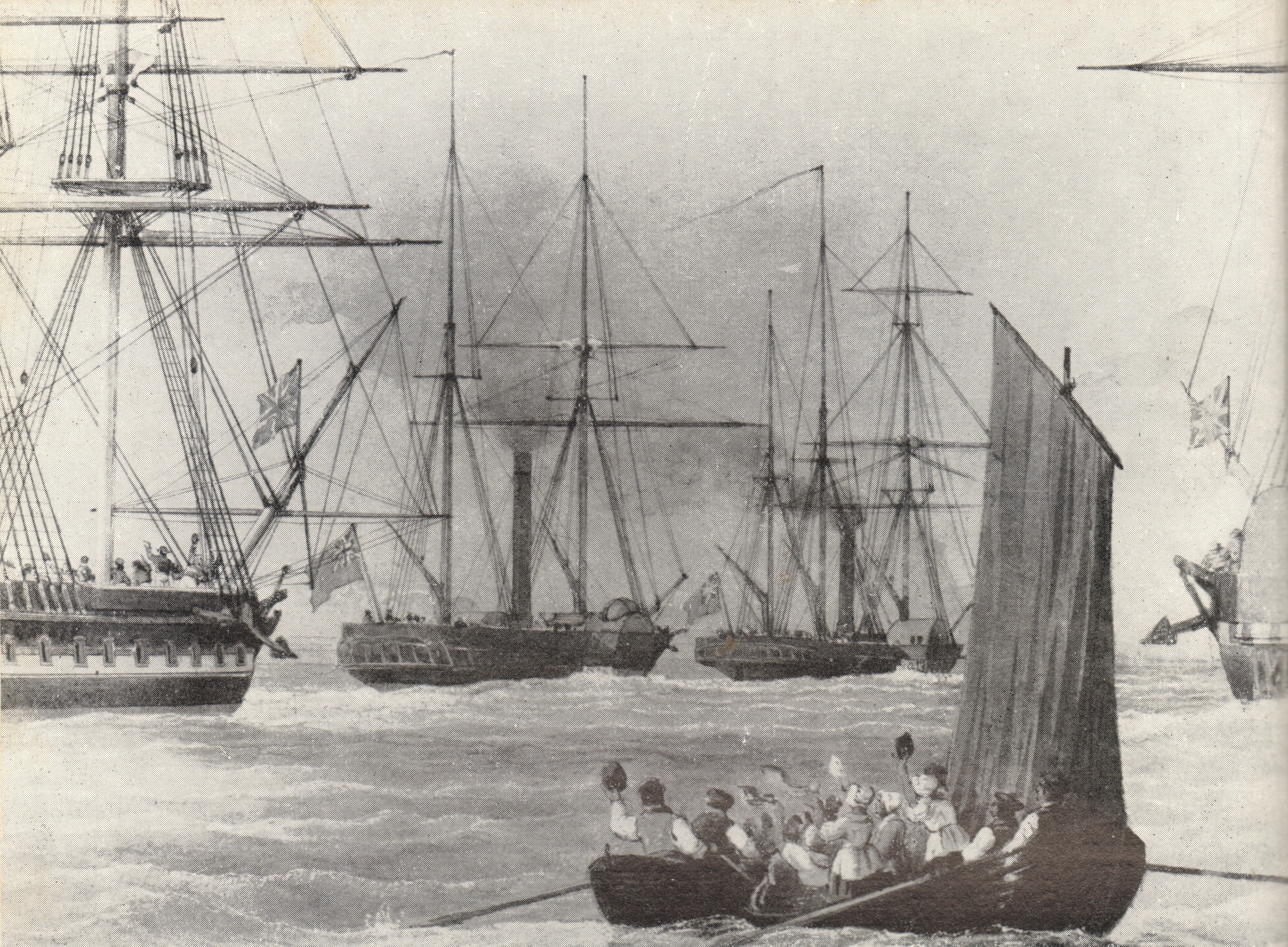
HMS Shearwater (second from left) in 1842

HMS Shearwater was a wooden paddle steamer which became the main surveying vessel in the UK in the 1840s. Shearwater was built in Harwich in 1826 for the Post Office, transferred to the Royal Navy in 1837, and equipped for surveying at Woolwich in 1841. Her length was 137', beam 23'.

The first task, under the command of Captain John Washington, was to complete the great survey of the North Sea which had occupied Captain William Hewett for 10 years until the loss of his ship HMS Fairy with all hands in 1840. While in the North Sea, Washington also continued Hewett's work on tidal observations, verifying the theory of William Whewell that there should be a point in the southern North sea where there is no tidal rise or fall - what is now called an Amphidromic point.

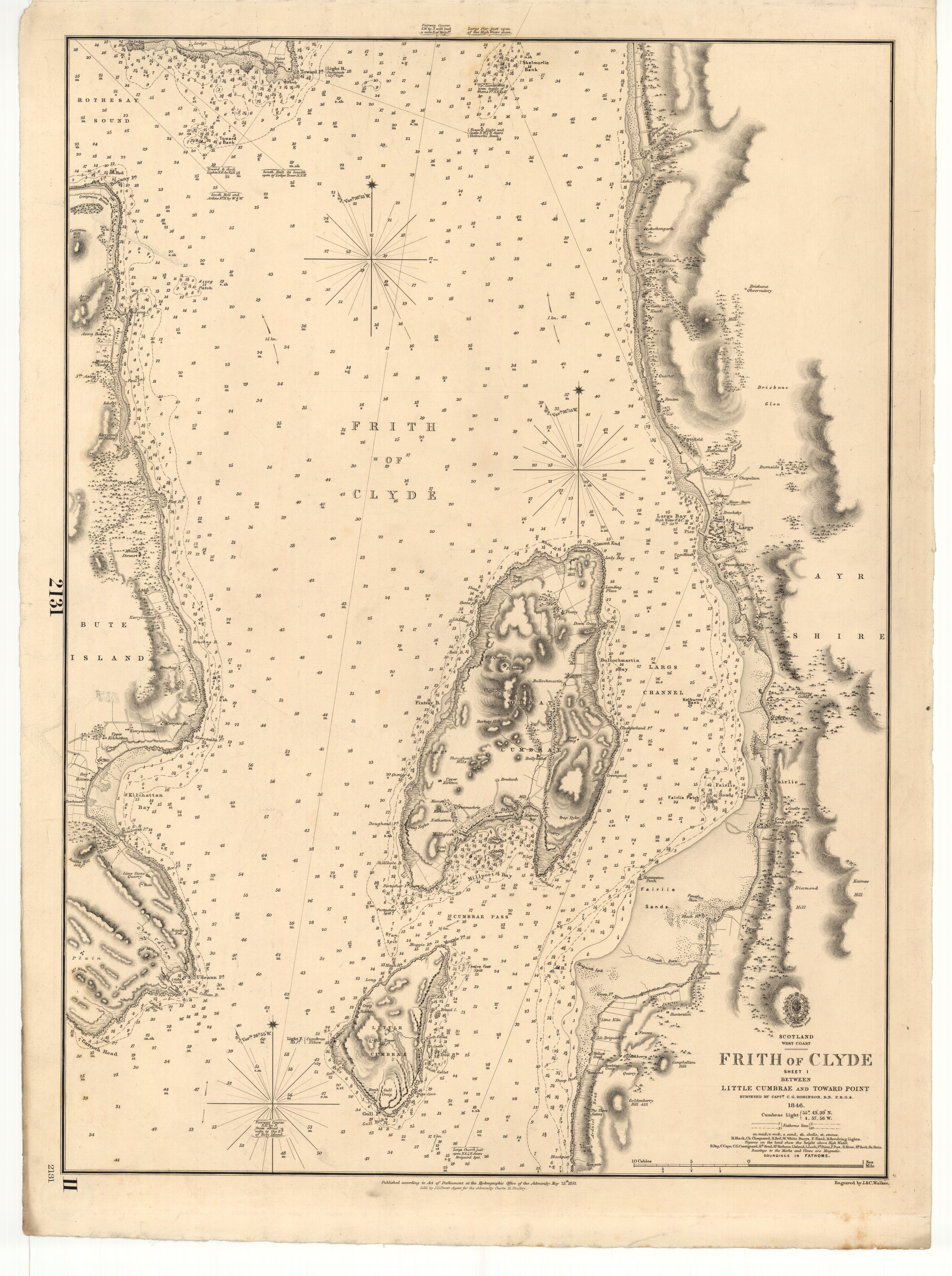
Admiralty chart of part of the Firth of Clyde, surveyed by Capt. Robinson in HHS Shearwater

Captain Charles Robinson took command of Shearwater in January 1842, and carried out surveying work, mostly in western Scotland, until 1847. Shearwater, along with other surveying boats was then sent to help with famine relief in Ireland, and from 1848 surveying work in home waters was carried out in hired ships

In August 1851 Lieutenant-Commander William Horton took command of Shearwater, with duties in the Mediterranean. She was sold in Malta in 1857.
